= Sérgio Mendes discography =

Discography for Sérgio Mendes.

== Discography ==
=== Albums ===
Sérgio Mendes & Brasil '65

- 1961: Dance Moderno (Philips)
- 1962: Cannonball's Bossa Nova (Riverside/Capitol Records)
- 1962: Do the Bossa Nova with Herbie Mann, Latin Fever with Herbie Mann
- 1964: Você Ainda Não Ouviu Nada! (Philips) Brazil and Chile, issued in the rest of the world as:
  - 1967: The Beat of Brazil (Atlantic)
- 1965: In Person at El Matador (Atlantic)
- 1965: Brasil '65 (aka In the Brazilian Bag) (Capitol)
- 1966: The Swinger from Rio (aka Bossa Nova York) (Atlantic)
- 1966: The Great Arrival (Atlantic)

Sérgio Mendes & Brasil '66

- 1966: Herb Alpert Presents Sérgio Mendes & Brasil '66 (A&M)
- 1967: Equinox (A&M)
- 1968: Look Around (A&M)
- 1968: Fool on the Hill (A&M)
- 1969: Crystal Illusions (A&M)
- 1969: Ye-Me-Lê (A&M)
- 1970: Edu Lobo: Sérgio Mendes Presents Lobo (A&M)
- 1970: Live at the Expo (A&M)
- 1970: Stillness (A&M)

Sérgio Mendes & Brasil '77

- 1971: País Tropical (A&M)
- 1972: The Sérgio Mendes and Brasil '66 Foursider (A&M, double compilation with one side of Brasil '77 tracks)
- 1972: Primal Roots (Brazil: Raízes) (A&M)
- 1973: In Concert (A&M)
- 1973: Love Music (Bell)
- 1974: Vintage 74 (Bell)
- 1975: Sérgio Mendes (Brazil: I Believe) (Elektra)
- 1976: Homecooking (Elektra)
- 1977: Sérgio Mendes and the New Brasil '77 (Elektra)

Sérgio Mendes

- 1967: Quiet Nights (Philips)
- 1968: Sérgio Mendes' Favorite Things (Atlantic)
- 1977: Pelé (Atlantic)
- 1978: Brasil '88 (Elektra)
- 1979: Alegria (Brazil: Horizonte Aberto) (WEA)
- 1979: Magic Lady (Elektra)
- 1983: Sérgio Mendes (A&M)
- 1984: Confetti (A&M)
- 1986: Brasil '86 (A&M)
- 1989: Arara (A&M)
- 1992: Brasileiro (Elektra)
- 1996: Oceano (Verve)
- 2006: Timeless (Concord)
- 2008: Encanto (Concord)
- 2010: Bom Tempo (Concord)
- 2014: Magic (Okeh)
- 2020: In the Key of Joy (Concord)

=== Singles ===
| Year | Single (A-side, B-side) Both sides from same album except where indicated | Chart positions | | | | | Album |
| Year | Single (A-side, B-side) Both sides from same album except where indicated | ^{US} | ^{US AC} | ^{US R&B} | ^{UK} | ^{AU} | Album |
|---|---|---|---|---|---|---|---|
| 1965 | "Reza" b/w "Noa Noa" (from The Beat of Brazil) | | | | | | Non-album tracks |
| 1966 | "All My Loving" b/w "The Telephone Song" | | | | | | Non-album tracks |
| 1966 | "Mas que nada" b/w "The Joker" | 47 | 4 | | | | Herb Alpert Presents Sérgio Mendes & Brasil '66 |
| 1966 | "Day Tripper" b/w "Slow Hot Wind" | | | | | | Herb Alpert Presents Sérgio Mendes & Brasil '66 |
| 1966 | "Constant Rain" b/w "Slow Hot Wind" (from Sérgio Mendes & Brasil '66) | 71 | 11 | | | | Equinox |
| 1967 | "Monday, Monday" b/w "The Great Arrival" | | | | | | Great Arrival |
| 1967 | "For Me" b/w "Gente" | 98 | 16 | | | | Equinox |
| 1967 | "Night and Day" b/w "Cinnamon and Clove" | 82 | 8 | | | | Equinox |
| 1967 | "The Frog" b/w "Watch What Happens" (from Equinox) | 126 | 21 | | | | Look Around |
| 1968 | "Say a Little Prayer" b/w "Comin' Home Baby" | 106 | 21 | | | | Sérgio Mendes' Favorite Things |
| 1968 | "With a Little Help from My Friends" b/w "Look Around" | | 31 | | | | Look Around |
| 1968 | "My Favorite Things" b/w "Tempo Feliz" | | | | | | Sérgio Mendes' Favorite Things |
| 1968 | "The Look of Love" b/w "Like a Lover" | 4 | 2 | | | | Look Around |
| 1968 | "The Fool on the Hill" b/w "So Many Stars" (from Look Around) | 6 | 1 | | | 14 | Fool on the Hill |
| 1968 | "Scarborough Fair" b/w "Canto Triste" | 16 | 2 | | | 8 | Fool on the Hill |
| 1969 | "Pretty World" b/w "Festa" (from Fool on the Hill) | 62 | 4 | | | 83 | Crystal Illusions |
| 1969 | "(Sittin' On) The Dock of the Bay" b/w "Song of No Regrets" | 66 | 12 | | | | Crystal Illusions |
| 1969 | "Wichita Lineman" b/w "Ye-Me-Le" | 95 | 34 | | | | Ye-Me-Le |
| 1970 | "Norwegian Wood" b/w "Masquerade" | 107 | 32 | | | | Ye-Me-Le |
| 1970 | "For What It's Worth" b/w "Viramundo" | 101 | 10 | | | | Stillness |
| 1970 | "Chelsea Morning" b/w "Where Are You Coming From" (from Ye-Me-Le) | | 21 | | | | Stillness |
| 1971 | "Righteous Life" b/w "Lost In Paradise" | | | | | | Stillness |
| 1971 | "Aza Branca" b/w "Sometimes in Winter" (from Stillness) | | | | | | Pais Tropical |
| 1971 | "So Many People" b/w "Zanzibar" | | | | | | Pais Tropical |
| 1971 | "After Midnight" b/w "Morro Velho" | | | | | | Pais Tropical |
| 1972 | "The Crab" b/w "After Sunrise" (from Primal Roots) | | | | | | Non-album track |
| 1973 | "Love Music" b/w "Walk the Way You Talk" | 113 | 24 | | | | Love Music |
| 1973 | "Where Is the Love" b/w "Hey Look at the Sun" | | 36 | | | | Love Music |
| 1973 | "Put a Little Love Away" b/w "Hey Look at the Sun" | | | | | | Love Music |
| 1975 | "If I Ever Lose This Heaven" b/w "You Been Away Too Long" | | | | | | Sérgio Mendes (Elektra) |
| 1975 | "Davy" b/w "The Trouble with Hello Is Goodbye" | | | | | | Sérgio Mendes (Elektra) |
| 1975 | "Emorio" b/w "Someday We'll All Be Free" (from Sérgio Mendes Elektra album) | | | | | | Home Cooking |
| 1976 | "Tell Me in a Whisper" b/w "Sunny Day" | | | | | | Home Cooking |
| 1976 | "Hey People, Hey" b/w "Shakara" | | | | | | Home Cooking |
| 1977 | "The Real Thing" (Original version) b/w "Home Cooking" (from Home Cooking) | | | | | | Non-album track |
| 1977 | "Love Me Tomorrow" b/w "Peninsula" | | | | | | Sérgio Mendes & The New Brasil '77 |
| 1977 | "The Real Thing" (Re-recording) b/w "Peninsula" | | 50 | 51 | | | Sérgio Mendes & The New Brasil '77 |
| 1977 | "Love City" b/w "Peninsula" | | | | | | Sérgio Mendes & The New Brasil '77 |
| 1978 | "Midnight Lovers" b/w "Misturada" | | | | | | Brasil '88 |
| 1978 | "Waters of March" b/w "Misturada" | | | | | | Brasil '88 |
| 1979 | "Lonely Woman" b/w "Summer Dream" | | | | | | Magic Lady |
| 1979 | "I'll Tell You" b/w "Lonely Woman" | | | 49 | | | Magic Lady |
| 1980 | "Let It Go" b/w "Magic Lady" | | | | | | Magic Lady |
| 1982 | "My Summer Love" b/w "Life in the Movies" | | | | | | Sérgio Mendes (A&M) |
| 1983 | "Never Gonna Let You Go" b/w "Carnaval" | 4 | 1 | 28 | 45 | 5 | Sérgio Mendes (A&M) |
| 1983 | "Rainbow's End" b/w "Carnaval" | 52 | 6 | | | | Sérgio Mendes (A&M) |
| 1984 | "Olympia" b/w "Carnaval" (from Sérgio Mendes A&M album) | 58 | 18 | | | | Confetti |
| 1984 | "Alibis" b/w "Confetti" | 29 | 5 | | | | Confetti |
| 1984 | "Real Life" b/w "Confetti" | | 17 | | | | Confetti |
| 1985 | "Let's Give a Little More This Time" b/w "Confetti" | | 33 | | | | Confetti |
| 1986 | "Nonstop" b/w "Flower of Bahia" | | | | | | Brasil '86 |
| 1986 | "Take This Love" b/w "Your Smile" | | 14 | | | | Brasil '86 |
| 1987 | "What Do We Mean to Each Other" b/w "Flower of Bahia" | | 19 | | | | Brasil '86 |
| 1992 | "Magalenha" b/w "" | | | | | | Brasileiro |
