= Stillness =

Studio album by Sérgio Mendes
- Released: 1970
- Recorded: 1968–69
- Studio: Venice, Italy
- Genre: Bossa nova
- Label: A&M; SP-4284
- Producer: Sérgio Mendes, Herb Alpert

Sérgio Mendes chronology
La Verità (1969)	Stillness (1970)	País Tropical (1971)

Professional ratings
Review scores
Source	Rating
Allmusic	4/5 stars

Stillness is the seventh album by Sérgio Mendes and Brasil '66.

Longtime featured singer of Brasil '66 Lani Hall left midway through completion of the album to marry Herb Alpert and to pursue a solo career. Mendes replaced Hall with Gracinha Leporace.

== Track listing ==
1. "Stillness" (Paula Stone) – 2:40
2. "Righteous Life" (Paula Stone) – 3:15
3. "Chelsea Morning" (Joni Mitchell) – 2:56
4. "Canção Do Nosso Amor" (Dalton Medeiros, Silveira De Aquino) – 3:46
5. "Viramundo" (Gilberto Gil, José Carlos Capinam) – 3:02
6. "Lost in Paradise" (Caetano Veloso) – vocals by Gracinha Leporace – 3:43
7. "For What It's Worth" (Stephen Stills) – 3:36
8. "Sometimes in Winter" (Steve Katz) – 4:43
9. "Celebration of the Sunrise" (instrumental) (Sebastião Neto, Oscar Castro Neves) – 1:45
10. "Stillness (reprise)" (Paula Stone) – 1:28

== Personnel ==
- Guitar: Oscar Castro-Neves
- Bass: Joe Osborn
- Piano: Sergio Mendes, Michael Lang
- Drums: Dom Um Romao, Mark Stevens
- Flute: Tom Scott
- Bass: Sebastião Neto
- Percussion: Rubens Bassini
- Vocals: Lani Hall, Gracinha Leporace, Sérgio Mendes, Karen Philipp
