= Pelé (album) =

Soundtrack album by Sérgio Mendes and Pelé
- Released: 1977
- Recorded: 1977
- Genre: Bossa nova, Música popular brasileira
- Length: 33:03
- Label: Atlantic SD 18231
- Producer: Sérgio Mendes

Sérgio Mendes chronology
Sergio Mendes and the New Brasil '77 (1977)	Pelé (1977)	Brasil '88 (1978)

Pelé is a 1977 album by the Brazilian composer and arranger Sérgio Mendes and the Brazilian footballer Pelé. It was the soundtrack for a documentary about Pelé's life. The album was Pelé's debut as a singer and songwriter. Pelé sings on "Meu Mundo É uma Bola (My World Is a Ball)" and "Cidade Grande (Big City)", accompanied largely by Gracinha Leporace.

== Reception ==
Professional ratings
Review scores
Source	Rating
Allmusic	3/5 stars

Fred Beldin reviewed the reissue of the album for Allmusic. Beldin wrote that "...the sounds are as lilting and tropical as all of the Brazilian light jazz specialist's work, though there are a few moments of quiet brooding that are unexpected. While plenty of non-musical celebrities have embarrassed themselves with their attempts at pop stardom, Pelé's contributions are pleasant and low-key". Beldin wrote of Pelé and Gracinha Leporace's vocals that her "soft, sweet tones blend smoothly with the soccer star to ensure that he never strays into discordant territory".

== Track listing ==
1. "O Coração do Rei (The King's Heart)" – 1:35
2. "Meu Mundo É uma Bola (My World Is a Ball)" – 4:07
3. "Memorias (Memories)" – 1:06
4. "Nascimento (Birth)" – 0:31
5. "Voltando a Bauru (Back to Bauru)" – 2:52
6. "Cidade Grande (Big City)" – 0:50
7. "Cidade Grande (Big City)" – 2:24
8. "Alma Latina (Latin Soul)" – 3:21
9. "A Tristeza do Adeus (The Sadness of Goodbye)" – 1:32
10. "A Tristeza do Adeus (The Sadness of Goodbye)" – 4:44
11. "Na Bahia (In Bahia)" – 2:43
12. "Amore e Agressao (Love and Aggression)" – 3:26
13. "Meu Mundo É uma Bola (My World Is a Ball)" – 3:52

== Personnel ==
- Pelé – vocals on "Meu Mundo É uma Bola (My World Is a Ball)" and "Cidade Grande (Big City)"
- Gracinha Leporace, Carol Rogers – vocals
- Gerry Mulligan – baritone saxophone, alto saxophone
- Bill Dickinson – double bass
- Oscar Castro-Neves – guitar
- Chico Spider – keyboards
- Jim Keltner – drums
- Chacal, Laudir De Oliveira, Steve Forman – percussion
- Sérgio Mendes – arranger, producer
- Geoff Gillette – engineer
