= In Concert (Sérgio Mendes album) =

Live album by Sérgio Mendes & Brazil '77
- Released: 1973
- Venue: Greek Theatre, Los Angeles
- Genre: Samba, Bossa Nova, Latin Pop
- Label: A&M
- Producer: Sérgio Mendes, Larry Levine

Sérgio Mendes & Brazil '77 chronology
Primal Roots (1972)	In Concert (1973)	Love Music (1973)

Professional ratings
Review scores
Source	Rating
Allmusic	4/5 stars

In Concert is a live album by Sérgio Mendes & Brasil '77 performed live at the Greek Theatre, Los Angeles. Although recorded in the US, it was not released there and, apart from a 1979 UK Music for Pleasure LP and cassette, has never been reissued.

== Track listing ==
1. "Intro - Viramundo"
2. "Going Out Of My Head"
3. "Girl From Ipanema"
4. "Carnival Medley: Gioco Di Roda / Canto De Ubiratan / After Sunrise"
5. "Fool On The Hill"
6. "Chelsea Morning"
7. "Sometimes in Winter"
8. "Mas Que Nada"
9. "The Look Of Love"
