= Come Down in Time =

Song by Elton John

from the album Tumbleweed Connection
- Released: 30 October 1970
- Recorded: March 1970
- Studio: Trident, London
- Genre: Roots rock; country rock
- Length: 3:25
- Label: Uni (US); DJM (UK)
- Songwriter(s): Elton John; Bernie Taupin
- Producer(s): Gus Dudgeon

"Come Down in Time" is the second track on Elton John's third album, Tumbleweed Connection, released in 1970. The lyrics were written by Bernie Taupin, Elton's long time writing partner. The song was originally recorded for John's second album, Elton John.

== Covers and other versions ==
The song was covered by Al Kooper on his 1971 album, New York City (You're a Woman), then later covered by Sting on the 1991 album Two Rooms: Celebrating the Songs of Elton John & Bernie Taupin. Norwegian jazz singer Radka Toneff also recorded the song for her 1982 album Fairy Tales, which features herself with Steve Dobrogosz on piano. A soulful version of the song was released as a 7" single by soul singer Eugene Pitt and his band the Jyve Fyve in 1970 on the AVCO Embassy (AVE-4568) label. The song was also covered by Judy Collins on her 1976 album Bread And Roses. Lani Hall recorded the song in 1972 for her first solo album, Sun Down Lady. It was covered by Laura Fernández in 2020 for her Okay, Alright album.

In October 2020, John issued a 10-inch vinyl only "jazz" version, backed by members of Hookfoot, recorded during the Tumbleweed Connection sessions, but not used on the album. The track's release coincided with the 50th anniversary re-release of Tumbleweed Connection, and was uncovered during archival research for John's box set Jewel Box, a multi-disc collection of early demos, and other rarities and B-sides, many of which were never previously released.

== Meaning and melody ==
"Come Down in Time" is one of the two exceptions to the primarily American Western musical themes of Tumbleweed Connection. The album was recorded at London's Trident Studio in March 1970, produced by Gus Dudgeon, and released in October 1970.

Set in the keys of A minor and D major, the song starts with an evocative harp introduction augmented by natural guitar harmonics. Conductor and orchestral arranger Paul Buckmaster's use of strings, harp, oboe, and horn set a plaintive and haunting mood.

Though originally using harp as the primary instrumental accompaniment, in his live sets John primarily replaced it with the piano. Despite not being a hit, the song was performed live in 1970, 1971, 1989, 1995, and subsequent solo tours, the last performances of the song included Ray Cooper on percussion in 2009. It was also performed as a duet by John and Sting on stage at a Rainforest Benefit concert in 1991 and again on the television program An Audience with Elton John in 1997.

The song maintains a steady, even tempo throughout, containing little of John's signature crescendos. The song itself outlines a conversation between a man and his lover; she urges him to come meet her one night. As he is walking and nears their agreed upon meeting place, he wonders whether she will be there or if he will be left alone to count the stars.

== Personnel ==
- Elton John – vocals
- Skaila Kanga – harp
- Les Thatcher – acoustic guitar
- Karl Jenkins – oboe
- Herbie Flowers – bass guitar
- Chris Laurence – acoustic bass
- Barry Morgan – drums
- Paul Buckmaster – arranger, conductor
