= Lani (album) =

Studio album by Lani Hall
- Released: 1983
- Genre: Pop music
- Language: Spanish
- Label: A&M Records
- Producers: Juan Carlos Calderón, José Quintana

Lani Hall chronology
Albany Park (1982)	Lani (1983)	Lani Hall (1984)

Lani is a studio album recorded by American singer Lani Hall. It was produced by Juan Carlos Calderón, and released by A&M Records in 1983. Lani is the first album by Hall to be recorded in Spanish language, and includes the song "The Quiero Así", a duet with Mexican singer José José; José, a fan of Herb Alpert Presents Sergio Mendes & Brasil '66, on which Hall sang lead vocals, wanted to record with her. The album was nominated for a Grammy Award for Best Latin Pop Performance in 1984.

The album's first single, "Para Vivir Así" features Hall's husband Herb Alpert on trumpet. Alpert would also release an instrumental version of "Te Quiero Así," retitled "Latin Lady," on his 1983 album, Blow Your Own Horn.

== Track listing ==
No.	Title	Writer(s)	Length
1.	"Estare Enamorada"	Juan Carlos Calderón
2.	"Tu, Solamente Tu"	Calderón
3.	"Te Quiero Así" (featuring José José)	Calderón
4.	"Adiós Tristeza"	Calderón
5.	"Si o No"	Calderón
6.	"Te Seguiré"	Calderón
7.	"Lluvia de Verano"	Calderón
8.	"Sé"	Calderón
9.	"Sergio Mendes' Medley (Agua de Beber, Más Que Nada, O Pato, Samba de Una Nota, Pulga Española, Reza, El Tonto de la Colina, Coqueta)"	Jobim de Moraes, Gimbel, Jorge Ben, J. D'Silva, Jobim, Mendoca, Wechter, E. Lobo, R. Guerra, Lennon-McCartney
