= Encanto (album) =

Studio album by Sérgio Mendes
- Released: March 5, 2008
- Recorded: September 2007 – February 2008
- Genre: Samba, neo-soul, R&B, latin pop
- Length: 55:24
- Label: Concord
- Producer: will.i.am, Sérgio Mendes

Sérgio Mendes chronology
Timeless (2006)	Encanto (2008)	Bom Tempo (2010)

Singles from Encanto
- 1. ""The Look of Love" (featuring Fergie)" Released: March 18, 2008; 2. ""Funky Bahia" (featuring will.i.am & Siedah Garrett)" Released: March 27, 2008

Professional ratings
Review scores
Source	Rating
Italian iTunes Store	4/5 stars
RapReviews.com	(7.5/10) link

Encanto is the thirty-sixth studio album by Brazilian musician Sérgio Mendes. It is his second work in collaboration with The Black Eyed Peas.

== Track listing ==
#	Title	Featured guest(s)	Time
1	"The Look of Love"	Fergie & will.i.am	04:00
2	"Funky Bahia"	will.i.am & Siedah Garrett	03:58
3	"Waters of March"	Ledisi	03:58
4	"Odo-Ya"	Carlinhos Brown	03:51
5	"Somewhere in the Hills"	Natalie Cole & Till Brönner	04:01
6	"Lugar Comum"	Jovanotti	04:16
7	"Dreamer"	Herb Alpert & Lani Hall	04:43
8	"Morning in Rio"		04:20
9	"Y vamos ya"	Juanes	04:18
10	"Catavento e Girassol"	Gracinha Leporace	03:51
11	"Acode"	Vanessa da Mata	04:28
12	"Água de Beber"	will.i.am	04:04
13	"Les Eaux de Mars (Waters of March - French Version)"	Zap Mama	03:57
14	"E Vamos Lá" (...let's go)		04:19

== Charts ==
Chart performance for Encanto
Chart (2008)	Peak position
Dutch Albums (Album Top 100)	48
French Albums (SNEP)	183
German Albums (Offizielle Top 100)	68
Japan Oricon Album Chart	20
Italian Albums (FIMI)	94
US Billboard 200	60
US Top Jazz Albums (Billboard)	1

== Release history ==
Region	Date
Japan	March 5, 2008
Italy	March 5, 2008
United States	June 10, 2008
