= Confetti (Sérgio Mendes album) =

Studio album by Sérgio Mendes
- Released: 1984
- Recorded: 1983
- Studio: A&M (Hollywood, California)
- Genre: Pop; soft rock
- Label: A&M Records; SP-4984
- Producer: Sérgio Mendes, Barry Mann (co-producer 1), Robbie Buchanan (co-producer 2, 3, 5 ,8)

Sérgio Mendes chronology
Sérgio Mendes (1983)	Confetti (1984)	Brasil '86 (1986)

Singles from Brasil '88
- 1. "Olympia" Released: 1984; 2. "Alibis" Released: 1984; 3. "Real Life" Released: 1985; 4. "Let's Give a Little More This Time" Released: 1985

Professional ratings
Review scores
Source	Rating
AllMusic	1.5/5 stars

Confetti is an album by Sérgio Mendes, released in 1984.

Most of the songs of the album were written by established US pop composers and lyricists such as Alan and Marilyn Bergman, Barry Mann, Cynthia Weil, Don Freeman, and Tom Snow. Among the notable singers on the album are Joe Pizzulo and Gracinha Leporace.

The song "Olympia" was written for the 1984 Summer Olympics in Los Angeles. Notable singles from album were: "Alibis", "Olympia", "Let's Give a Little More This Time" and "Real Life".

== Track listing ==
1. "Olympia" (Barry Mann, Cynthia Weil) – 5:25
2. "Say It with Your Body" (John Bettis, Barry Mann, Cynthia Weil) – 4:31
3. "Let's Give a Little More This Time" (Barry Mann, Cynthia Weil) – 3:42
4. "The Sound of One Song (Depende de Nós)" (Ivan Lins, Vítor Martins, Cynthia Weil) – 3:23
5. "Alibis" (Tony Macaulay, Tom Snow) – 3:59
6. "Dance Attack" (David Batteau, Don Freeman) – 3:55
7. "Kisses" (Ivan Lins, Vítor Martins, Alan Bergman, Marilyn Bergman) – 3:20
8. "Real Life" (Barry Alfonso, Tom Snow) – 3:59
9. "Morrer de Amor" ("To Die of Love") (Oscar Castro-Neves, Luvercy Fiorini) – 3:29

=== Brazilian version ===
1. "Olympia" – 5:28
2. "Say It with Your Body" – 4:32
3. "Let's Give a Little More This Time" – 3:43
4. "Depende de Nós" (Ivan Lins, Vítor Martins) – 3:30
5. "Real Life" – 3:59
6. "Alibis" – 4:03
7. "Dance Attack" – 3:55
8. "Kisses" – 3:24
9. "To Die of Love" – 3:27
10. "Olympia" (Instrumental version) (Barry Mann) - 4:19

== Personnel ==
Musicians

- Sérgio Mendes – keyboards (1–3, 5, 6), arrangements (2–8), synthesizers (3, 4), synth solo (4), synthesizer arrangements (4), percussion (4), Fender Rhodes (7)
- Michael Boddicker – keyboards (1, 2, 5), synthesizer programming (1, 2, 5)
- Robbie Buchanan – keyboards (1–3, 5, 8), synthesizer programming (1–3), drum synthesizer programming (1), arrangements (1–3, 5, 8), synthesizers (3, 8)
- Don Dorsey – synthesizer programming (1, 5)
- Ivan Lins – acoustic piano (4, 7), arrangements (7)
- Gilson Perenzzetta – Fender Rhodes (4, 7), arrangements (7)
- John Beasley – synthesizers (4), synthesizer arrangements (4)
- Randy Waldman – synthesizers (4)
- John Barnes – keyboards (6), synthesizer programming (6), arrangements (6)
- Don Freeman – keyboards (6), arrangements (6)
- Dann Huff – guitars (1–3, 5), guitar solo (3, 8), electric guitar (4, 8)
- Paul Jackson Jr. – guitars (2, 3, 5), acoustic guitar (4)
- Oscar Castro-Neves – acoustic guitar (4, 7, 9)
- Nathan East – bass (2–4)
- Jimmy Johnson – bass (5, 8)
- John Robinson – drums (1–3)
- Terry Bozzio – drum synthesizer programming (1), clap-trap (6)
- Carlos Vega – drums (4, 5, 8)
- Steve Forman – percussion (1–7)
- Ron Powell – percussion (2)
- Ernie Watts – saxophone solo (5)

Strings (Tracks 7 & 9)

- Dave Grusin – arrangements and conductor (7)
- Oscar Castro-Neves – arrangements and conductor (9)
- Mary Lane, Raphael Kramer, Harry Shlutz and David Speltz – cello
- Isabelle Daskoff, Reginald Hill, Bill Hybell, George Kast, Norma Leonard, Constance Meyer, David Montagu, Spiro Stamos, Robert Sushel, Mari Tsumura-Botnick, Gerard Vinci and Harold Wolf – violin

Vocals

- Joe Pizzulo – vocals (1, 3, 5, 8), additional backing vocals (1), backing vocals (5), BGV arrangements (5)
- Harold Clousing – additional backing vocals (1)
- Sérgio Mendes – additional backing vocals (1)
- Phil Perry – additional backing vocals (1), vocals (6)
- Siedah Garrett – vocals (2)
- Carmen Twillie – backing vocals (2, 3)
- Julia Waters – backing vocals (2, 3)
- Maxine Waters – backing vocals (2, 3)
- Gary Falcone – backing vocals (5), BGV arrangements (5)
- Tommy Faragher – backing vocals (5)
- Gracinha Leporace – vocals (7, 9)

Olympic choir on "Olympia"

- Beth Anderson, Deborah Davis, Gary Falcone, Lani Hall, James Ingram, Phil Perry, Joe Pizzulo, Jeffrey Osborne, Carmen Twillie, Julia Waters and Maxine Waters

Children's choir on "The Sound of One Song"

- Kristin Bernhardi, Kristina Birk, Elizabeth Cathcart, Jennifer Cathcart, Rebecca Clinger, Teresa Dawson, Sandie Hall, Richard Hamilton, Jessica Harris, Joel Harris, Brandon Roberts and Latisha Smith
- Jon Joyce – vocal coordinator

=== Production ===
- Sérgio Mendes – producer, liner notes
- Barry Mann – producer (1)
- Robbie Buchanan – producer (2, 3, 5, 8)
- Bruce Swedien – associate producer, recording, mixing, liner notes
- Geoff Gillette – recording
- Benny Faccone – assistant engineer
- Bernie Grundman – mastering at Bernie Grundman Mastering (Hollywood, California)
- Roland Young – art direction
- Otto Stupakoff – photography
- Tracy Shiffman – design, illustration

== Charts ==
=== Album ===
Year	Chart	Position
1984	US Billboard 200	70
1984	US Billboard Jazz Albums	31
1984	US Cash Box Albums	132

=== Singles ===
Year	Single	Chart	Position
1984	"Olympia"	US Billboard Hot 100	58
1984	"Olympia"	US Billboard Adult Contemporary	18
1984	"Alibis"	US Billboard Hot 100	29
1984	"Alibis"	US Billboard Adult Contemporary	5
1984	"Alibis"	US Radio & Records Contemporary Hit Radio	26
1984	"Alibis"	US Radio & Records Adult Contemporary	4
1984	"Alibis"	Canada RPM Adult Contemporary	3
1984	"Real Life"	US Billboard Adult Contemporary	17
1985	"Let's Give a Little More This Time"	US Billboard Adult Contemporary	33
