= Dom Um Romão =

Brazilian jazz drummer (1925–2005)

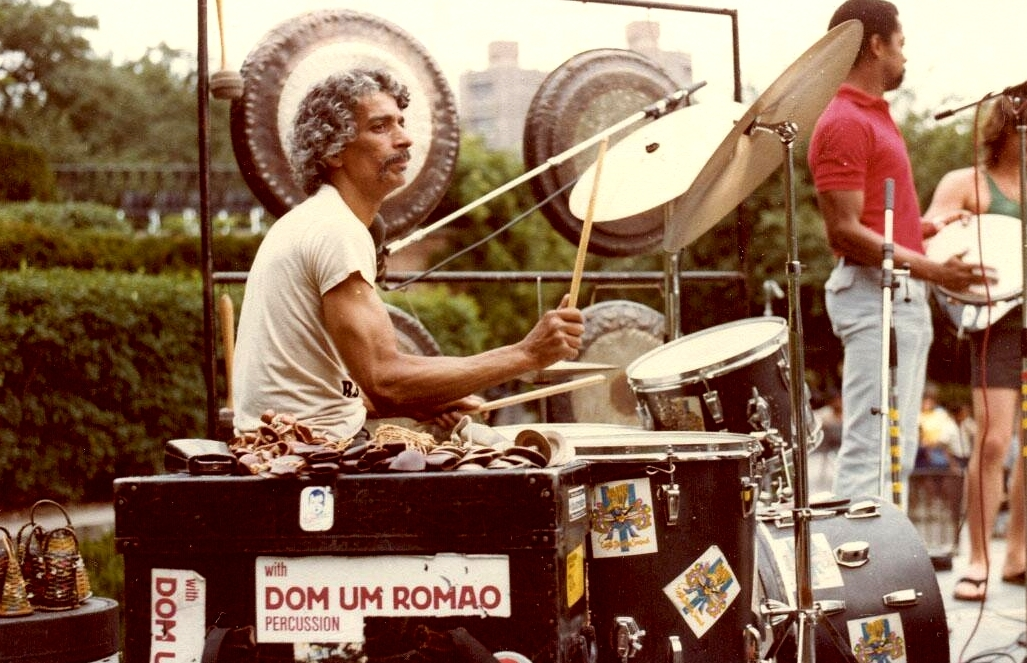
- Um Romão hosting an outdoor concert in Central Park, around 1980

Background information
- Born: 3 August 1925; Rio de Janeiro, United States of Brazil
- Died: 27 July 2005 (aged 79) Rio de Janeiro, Brazil
- Genres: Jazz, bossa nova, jazz fusion
- Occupations: Musician, songwriter, record producer
- Instruments: Drums, percussion
- Years active: 1942–2005
- Labels: Muse, Pablo, Vogue, Phillips, Waterlilly, JSR/Irma, JSR/Natasha, JSR/Irma, JSR/Cuadra

Dom Um Romão (3 August 1925 – 27 July 2005) was a Brazilian jazz drummer and percussionist. Noted for his expressive stylings with the fusion band Weather Report, Romão also recorded with artists such as Cannonball Adderley, Paul Simon, Antonio Carlos Jobim, Jorge Ben, Sergio Mendes and Brasil '66, and Tony Bennett. He was the percussionist Tom Jobim brought to the studio for the album Jobim recorded with Frank Sinatra in 1967 for Reprise Records, Francis Albert Sinatra & Antônio Carlos Jobim.

He died in Rio de Janeiro shortly after suffering a stroke.

== Discography ==
=== As leader ===
- 1965 Dom Um (Philips)
- 1972 Dom Um Romão (Muse)
- 1973 Spirit of the Times (Muse)
- 1974 Braun-Blek-Blu (Happy Bird)
- 1977 Hotmosphere (Pablo)
- 1978 Om (ECM Records)
- 1990 Samba de Rua (Vogue Records)
- 1993 Saudades (Waterlilly)
- 1999 Rhythm Traveller (Natasha)
- 2001 Lake of Perseverance (Irma)
- 2002 Nu Jazz meets Brazil (Cuadra)

=== As sideman ===
With Cannonball Adderley

- Cannonball's Bossa Nova (Riverside, 1962)

With Harry Belafonte

- Turn the World Around (Columbia, 1977)

With Jorge Ben

- Samba Esquema Novo (Philips, 1963)

With Blood, Sweat & Tears

- Mirror Image (Columbia, 1974)

With Luiz Bonfa and Maria Toledo

- Braziliana (Philips, 1965)

With Ron Carter

- Yellow & Green (CTI, 1976)

With João Donato

- A Bad Donato (Blue Thumb, 1970)

With Peter Giger and Family of Percussion

- Mozambique Meets Europe (B&W music, 1992)

With Astrud Gilberto

- Look to the Rainbow (Verve, 1966)
- Beach Samba (Verve, 1967)

With Astrud Gilberto and Stanley Turrentine

- Gilberto with Turrentine (CTI, 1971)

With Vince Guaraldi

- Alma-Ville (Warner Bros.-Seven Arts, 1969)

With Antonio Carlos Jobim

- The Wonderful World of Antonio Carlos Jobim (Warner Bros., 1965)
- A Certain Mr. Jobim (Warner Bros., 1967)
- Wave (A&M, 1967)

With Yusef Lateef

- The Doctor is In... and Out (Atlantic, 1976)

With Herbie Mann

- Do the Bossa Nova with Herbie Mann (Atlantic, 1962)
- Latin Fever (Atlantic, 1964)
- Brazil: Once Again (Atlantic, 1977)

With Sérgio Mendes

- Sergio Mendes' Favorite Things (Atlantic, 1968)
- Fool on the Hill (A&M, 1968)
- Ye-Me-Lê (A&M, 1969)
- Crystal Illusions (A&M, 1969)

With Helen Merrill

- Casa Forte (Trio, 1980)

With Robert Palmer

- Heavy Nova (EMI, 1988)

With Annette Peacock

- I'm the One (RCA Victor, 1972)

With Esther Phillips

- Esther Phillips Sings (Atlantic, 1966)

With Dory Previn

- We're Children of Coincidence and Harpo Marx (Warner Bros., 1976)

With Wanda Sá

- Wanda Vagamente (RGE, 1964)

With Frank Sinatra

- Francis Albert Sinatra & Antônio Carlos Jobim (Reprise, 1967)

With Stanley Turrentine

- The Sugar Man (CTI, rec., 1971, rel. 1975)

With Collin Walcott

- Grazing Dreams (ECM, 1977)

With Walter Wanderley

- Batucada (Verve, 1967)
- Kee-Ka-Roo (Verve, 1967)

With Weather Report

- I Sing the Body Electric (Columbia, 1972)
- Live in Tokyo (Columbia, 1972)
- Sweetnighter (Columbia, 1973)
- Mysterious Traveller (Columbia, 1974)
