= Joe Pizzulo =

American vocalist (born 1951)

- Born: Joe Pizzulo; June 15, 1951 (age 75); Youngstown, Ohio, U.S.
- Genres: R&B; soul; pop; soft rock; dance-pop
- Occupations: Singer-songwriter; musician
- Instrument: Vocals
- Years active: 1969–present

Joe Pizzulo (born June 15, 1951) is an American vocalist best known as one of the lead singers on 1980s hit singles credited to Sérgio Mendes, including "Never Gonna Let You Go" (from Mendes' self-titled 1983 album) and "Alibis" (from the 1984 album Confetti). Pizzulo has had several singles and soundtrack appearances, but he is also a prominent background singer for many artists. He is also known as the singer of English version of the 1988 Olympic theme song "Hand in Hand".

Joe Pizzulo started his music career with a band called Roadshow in 1969 after attending Ursuline High School in Youngstown, Ohio. His singing partners in that band were Buddy Cattafa and Debbie Komara. He later became a member of Brainchild. He eventually moved to California in 1974 and started a new band called White Licorice. By the time 1979 came around, he was touring with Alice Cooper as a background singer. His career quickly took off after that with his recording of "Never Gonna Let You Go" for Sérgio Mendes.

Pizzulo's daughter auditioned in the seventh season of The Voice under the name of Sugar Joans and earned a spot in coach Gwen Stefani's team.

== Works ==
=== Albums ===
His albums include (known album appearances are in parentheses):

==== All the Best ====
All the Best

Studio album by Joe Pizzulo
- Released: 2005
- Recorded: 2004
- Genres: Pop; adult contemporary
- Label: Warner Music Philippines

All the Best – by Joe Pizzulo (re-recordings of his best-known songs were re-done by Pizzulo himself). Pizzulo's voice tracks were done in the United States but the mixing and re-arranging was done in the Philippines through Alkemi Productions and Frederick Garcia, with recording artist, Nina. Along with the members of the Passage band, these songs were reproduced late 2005. During his stay in the Philippines, he had a concert along with Teri DeSario, Nina and Passage.

1. "I'm Never Gonna Give You Up" (duet with Nina)
2. "What Do We Mean to Each Other" (duet with Nina)
3. "Take This Love"
4. "Let's Give a Little More This Time"
5. "Never Gonna Let You Go" (duet with Kate Yanai)
6. "What Do We Mean to Each Other" (non-duet version)
7. "Rainbow's End"
8. "The Prayer" (duet with his daughter)
9. "Where Are the Stars"
10. "Somewhere in Time"

==== Memories of Love: Live ====
Memories of Love: Live – by Joe Pizzulo, Lou Pardini and Kevyn Lettau.

1. "Let's Give a Little More This Time"
2. "Take This Love"
3. "What Do We Mean to Each Other" (duet with Kevyn Lettau)
4. "Never Gonna Let You Go" (duet with Kevyn Lettau)
5. "Yesterday" (duet with Lou Pardini)
6. "I'm Better at Hello" (duet with Kevyn Lettau)

=== Singles ===
- "Olympic Dreams" – Joe Pizzulo and Harold Faltermeyer
- "Take My Breath Away" – Berlin (B-side is the song "Radar Radio" by Joe Pizzulo and Giorgio Moroder)

=== Soundtrack appearances ===
- Hero and the Terror – Original Soundtrack by David Michael Frank
- Over the Top – Original Soundtrack
- Scarface – Original Soundtrack
- The Prince of Egypt – Original Soundtrack
- Little Shop of Horrors – Original Film Soundtrack
- Disney's Dinosaurs (Big Songs)
- Scooby-Doo! and the Witch's Ghost
- Scooby-Doo and the Alien Invaders
- Walt Disney's Carousel of Progress – "There's A Great Big Beautiful Tomorrow" duet with Gloria Kaye Kolmatki

=== Background singer and album appearances ===
Artists that Joe Pizzulo has been a background singer for. His album appearances are in parentheses.

- Giorgio Moroder Project (To Be Number One)
- Sérgio Mendes (on his Brasileiro, Oceano, Confetti, Brasil '86 and Self Titled albums)
- Alice Cooper (Flush the Fashion)
- Barry Manilow (Swing Street)
- Eddie Money (Nothing to Lose and Can't Hold Back)
- Eros Ramazzotti (Tutte Storie)
- David Lee Roth (Skyscraper)
- Janet Jackson (Dream Street)
- Irene Cara (What a Feelin')
- Laura Branigan (Self Control and Branigan 2)
- Wang Chung (Mosaic and The Warmer Side of Cool)
- Barbra Streisand (Till I Loved You)
- Paul Young (Other Voices)
- Kenny Loggins (Yesterday, Today, Tomorrow)
- Petra (Wake-Up Call)
- Rocket from the Crypt (Scream, Dracula, Scream!)
- Dori Caymmi (Brasilian Serenata)
- Gary Wright (Who I Am)
- Patti LaBelle (Be Yourself)
- Alice Cooper (Flush the Fashion)
- New Monkees (Self Titled)
- Sam Kinison (Leader of the Banned)
- Gloria Loring (Turn the Page)
- The Allman Brothers Band (Brothers of the Road)
- Donna Summer (All Systems Go)
- Looney Tunes (Bugs and Friends Sing the Beatles and Looney Tunes Kwazy Christmas)
- Freedom Williams (Freedom)
- Winnie the Pooh (Take My Hand: Songs from the 100 Acre Wood)
- Martha Davis (of The Motels fame) (Policy)
- Tom Saviano (Making Up Lost Time)
- Jennifer Rush (Heart Over Mind)
- Robbie Patton (No Problem)
- Gregg Rolie (Gringo)
- Eric Martin (I'm Only Fooling Myself)
- Various Artists (Sincerely... Mariya Takeuchi Songbook) – He sings a duet number "Tenshi no Tameiki" (天使のため息; When Angels Cry) with Marilyn Martin.
- Red 7 (When the Sun Goes Down)
- New Frontier (Self Titled)
- David Hallyday (True Cool and Rock 'N' Heart)
- Instasong.com and GiftSongs.com (formerly known as P.S. I Love You) – lead singer for most of their musical greetings
- Sounds of Pisces (Aquarium Vol. 1)
- Anne Murray (Harmony)
- Rob Tro (Intro)

Pizzulo has also worked with Heart, Spandau Ballet, Burt Bacharach, Gladys Knight, Kenny Rankin, Dionne Warwick, Roger Daltrey, Engelbert Humperdinck, Melissa Manchester, Bette Midler, Luis Miguel, Graham Nash, and others.

=== Hit singles ===
- "Let's Give a Little More This Time"
- "Take This Love"
- "What Do We Mean to Each Other"
- "Never Gonna Let You Go"
- "Rainbow's End"
- "Alibis"
