= Sun Down Lady =

Studio album by Lani Hall
- Released: 1972
- Studio: A&M (Hollywood)
- Genre: Pop, jazz
- Length: 37:16
- Label: A&M
- Producer: Herb Alpert

Lani Hall chronology
Sun Down Lady (1972)	Hello It's Me (1975)

Professional ratings
Review scores
Source	Rating
Allmusic	4.5 /5 stars

Sun Down Lady is the debut album by Lani Hall.

== Track listing ==
Side One

1. "Love Song" (Lesley Duncan) 2:55
2. "Tiny Dancer" (Elton John, Bernie Taupin) 4:06
3. "How Can I Tell You" (Cat Stevens) 2:56
4. "You" (Lani Hall) 3:58
5. "Ocean Song" (Liz Thorsen) 3:40

Side Two

1. "We Could Be Flying" (Michel Colombier, Paul Williams) 3:53
2. "Come Down in Time" (Elton John, Bernie Taupin) 3:39
3. "Sun Down" (Willis Alan Ramsey) 3:30
4. "Vincent" (Don McLean) 5:55
5. "Wherever I May Find Him" (Paul Simon) 1:53

The track "Sun Down" is a rewritten version of the song better known as "Muskrat Love," which America recorded in 1973 and would become a hit for Captain & Tennille in 1976.

== Personnel ==
- Lani Hall - vocals
- Clarence McDonald - keyboards
- Jim Gordon - drums
- Chuck Domanico - bass
- Louis Shelton - guitar
- Larry Carlton - guitar
- Milt Holland - percussion
- Pete Jolly - accordion on “How Can I Tell You”
- Tim Weisberg - electric flute on “Ocean Song”
- Herb Alpert - vocals
