= Anything Goes (Herb Alpert and Lani Hall album) =

Live album by Herb Alpert, Lani Hall
- Released: 2009
- Recorded: 2008
- Genre: Jazz

Anything Goes is a 2009 album by Herb Alpert. It was Alpert's first album with his wife, singer Lani Hall. The album was recorded live in 2008.
