= The Swinger from Rio =

Studio album by Sérgio Mendes
- Released: December 1966
- Recorded: December 7–9, 1964
- Studio: Atlantic (New York City)
- Genre: Bossa nova
- Label: Atlantic
- Producer: Nesuhi Ertegun

Sérgio Mendes chronology
The Swinger from Rio (1966)	The Great Arrival (1966)

Professional ratings
Review scores
Source	Rating
AllMusic	3/5 stars

The Swinger from Rio is a 1966 album by Sérgio Mendes. Recorded over three days in December 1964 for the Atlantic label, it features guest artists Phil Woods, Art Farmer, and Hubert Laws, plus Antônio Carlos Jobim on rhythm guitar. It has also been released under the title Bossa Nova York.

== Track listing ==
1. "Maria Moita" (Carlos Lyra, Vinicius de Moraes)
2. "Sambinha Bossa Nova (Só Tinha De Ser Com Você)" (Antônio Carlos Jobim, Aloysio de Oliveira)
3. "Batida Diferente" (Durval Ferreira, Maurício Einhorn)
4. "Só Danço Samba" (Antônio Carlos Jobim, Vinicius de Moraes)
5. "Pau Brazil" (Sérgio Mendes)
6. "Garota de Ipanema" (Antônio Carlos Jobim, Vinicius de Moraes)
7. "Useless Panorama" (Antônio Carlos Jobim)
8. "Vivo Sonhando"- "The Dreamer" (Antônio Carlos Jobim, Gene Lees)
9. "Primavera" (Carlos Lyra)
10. "Consolação" (Baden Powell)
11. "Favela" (Antônio Carlos Jobim)

== Personnel ==
- Sérgio Mendes - piano
- Art Farmer - flugelhorn (tracks 2, 6, 7) (recorded 7 December 1964)
- Phil Woods - alto saxophone (tracks 1, 4, 8) (recorded 8 December 1964)
- Hubert Laws - flute (tracks 3, 5, 9, 11) (recorded 9 December 1964)
- Antônio Carlos Jobim - rhythm guitar
- Tiao Neto - bass
- Chico de Souza - drums
- Tom Dowd - audio engineer
