= Ye-Me-Lê =

Studio album by Sérgio Mendes
- Released: 1969
- Recorded: 1968
- Studio: A&M (Hollywood, California)
- Genre: Bossa nova
- Label: A&M; SP-4236
- Producer: Sérgio Mendes

Sérgio Mendes chronology
Crystal Illusions (1969)	Ye-Me-Lê (1969)	La verità (1969)

Professional ratings
Review scores
Source	Rating
Allmusic	3/5 stars

Ye-Me-Lê is the sixth album by Sérgio Mendes and Brasil '66.

== Track listing ==
1. "Wichita Lineman" (Jimmy Webb) (2:48)
2. "Norwegian Wood" (John Lennon, Paul McCartney) (3:53)
3. "Some Time Ago" (Sergio Mihanovich) (2:24)
4. "Moanin'" (Bobby Timmons) (3:05)
5. "Look Who's Mine" (Marcos Valle, Paulo Sérgio Valle, Alan Bergman, Marilyn Bergman) (3:35)
6. "Ye-Me-Lê" (Luis Carlos Vinhas, Chico Feitosa) (2:27)
7. "Easy to Be Hard" (James Rado, Gerome Ragni, Galt MacDermot) (2:45)
8. "Where Are You Coming From?" (Dori Caymmi, Nelson Motta, Lani Hall) (4:05)
9. "Masquerade" (Leonard Haynes / Ron Rose) (3:37)
10. "What the World Needs Now" (Burt Bacharach, Hal David) (2:14)

== Personnel ==
- Sergio Mendes, keyboards, arrangements, vocals
- Dave Grusin, orchestral arrangements
- Lani Hall, vocals
- Karen Philipp, vocals
- Oscar Castro-Neves, guitar
- Sebastian Neto, bass
- Dom Um Romão, drums, percussion
