= Love Music (Sérgio Mendes album) =

Studio album by Sérgio Mendes
- Released: 1973
- Recorded: 1972
- Genre: Bossa nova
- Label: Bell; 1119
- Producer: Bones Howe

Sérgio Mendes chronology
| In Concert (1973) | Love Music (1973) | Vintage 74 (1974) |

Love Music is the third studio album by Sérgio Mendes and Brasil '77. This is the first album to feature vocals by Gracinha Leporace and Bonnie Bowden.

== Track listing ==
1. "Where Is the Love" (Ralph MacDonald, William Salter) 3:12
2. "Put a Little Love Away" (Brian Potter, Dennis Lambert) 3:15
3. "Don't Let Me Be Lonely Tonight" (James Taylor) 3:13
4. "Killing Me Softly with His Song" (Charles Fox, Norman Gimbel) 3:39
5. "Love Music" (Brian Potter, Dennis Lambert) 3:06
6. "You Can't Dress Up a Broken Heart" (Brian Potter, Dennis Lambert) 2:56
7. "Hey Look at the Sun" (Nelson Angelo) 3:59
8. "Walk the Way You Talk" (Burt Bacharach, Hal David) 3:29
9. "I Won't Last a Day Without You" (Paul Williams, Roger Nichols) 4:32
10. "I Can See Clearly Now" (Johnny Nash) 2:26

== Personnel ==
- Acoustic Guitar, Electric Guitar – Oscar Castro-Neves
- Arranged By [Rhythm Section] – Bob Alcivar, Sérgio Mendes
- Arranged By [Vocal Arrangements], Keyboards – Bob Alcivar
- Art Direction – Beverly Weinstein
- Bass – Sebastian Neto
- Bongos, Congas, Percussion – Paulinho da Costa (Paulo Da Costa)
- Congas, Triangle, Percussion – Laudir de Oliveira
- Coordinator [Production Co-ordinator] – Pamela Vale
- Design [Tepee Graphics] – David Larkham, Ron Wong
- Drums – Claudio Slon
- Electric Guitar, Rhythm Guitar, Twelve-String Guitar – Dennis Budimir
- Engineer [Assistant] – Biff Dawes, Ed Barton, Ken Caillat, Terry Stark
- Mastered By [Disc Mastering] – John Golden
- Photography By – Ed Caraeff
- Piano, Electric Piano – Sérgio Mendes
- Producer, Engineer, Sounds – Bones Howe
- Vocals – Bonnie Bowden, Gracinha Leporace
