= Crystal Illusions =

Studio album by Sérgio Mendes
- Released: 1969
- Recorded: 1968
- Studios: A&M (Hollywood, California)
- Genre: Bossa nova
- Labels: A&M; SP-4197
- Producers: Herb Alpert, Sérgio Mendes

Sérgio Mendes chronology
Fool on the Hill (1968)	Crystal Illusions (1969)	Ye-Me-Lê (1969)

Professional ratings
Review scores
Source	Rating
Allmusic	4/5 stars

Crystal Illusions is the fifth album by Sérgio Mendes and Brasil '66.

== Track listing ==
No.	Title	Writer(s)	Length
1.	"(Sittin' On) The Dock of the Bay"	Steve Cropper, Otis Redding	3:13
2.	"Viola (Viola Enluarada)"	Marcos Valle, Paulo Sérgio Valle	3:51
3.	"Song of No Regrets"	Lani Hall, Sérgio Mendes	3:58
4.	"Salt Sea"	Lani Hall, Sérgio Mendes, Sebastião Neto	2:32
5.	"Empty Faces"	Lani Hall, Milton Nascimento	2:51
6.	"Pretty World"	Antonio Adolfo, Alan Bergman, Marilyn Bergman, Tibério Gaspar	3:20
7.	"Dois Dias"	Dori Caymmi, Nelson Motta	2:31
8.	"You Stepped Out of a Dream"	Nacio Herb Brown, Gus Kahn	2:36
9.	"Crystal Illusions (Memórias de Marta Saré)"	Gianfrancesco Guarnieri, Lani Hall, Edu Lobo	7:49

== Personnel ==
- Sérgio Mendes – keyboards, vocals, arranger, producer
- Lani Hall, Karen Philipp – vocals
- Oscar Castro-Neves – guitar
- Sebastião Neto – bass
- Rubens Bassini – percussion
- Dom Um Romão – drums
- Herb Alpert – producer
- Dave Grusin – orchestra arranger, conductor
