= Lani Hall =

American singer (born 1945)

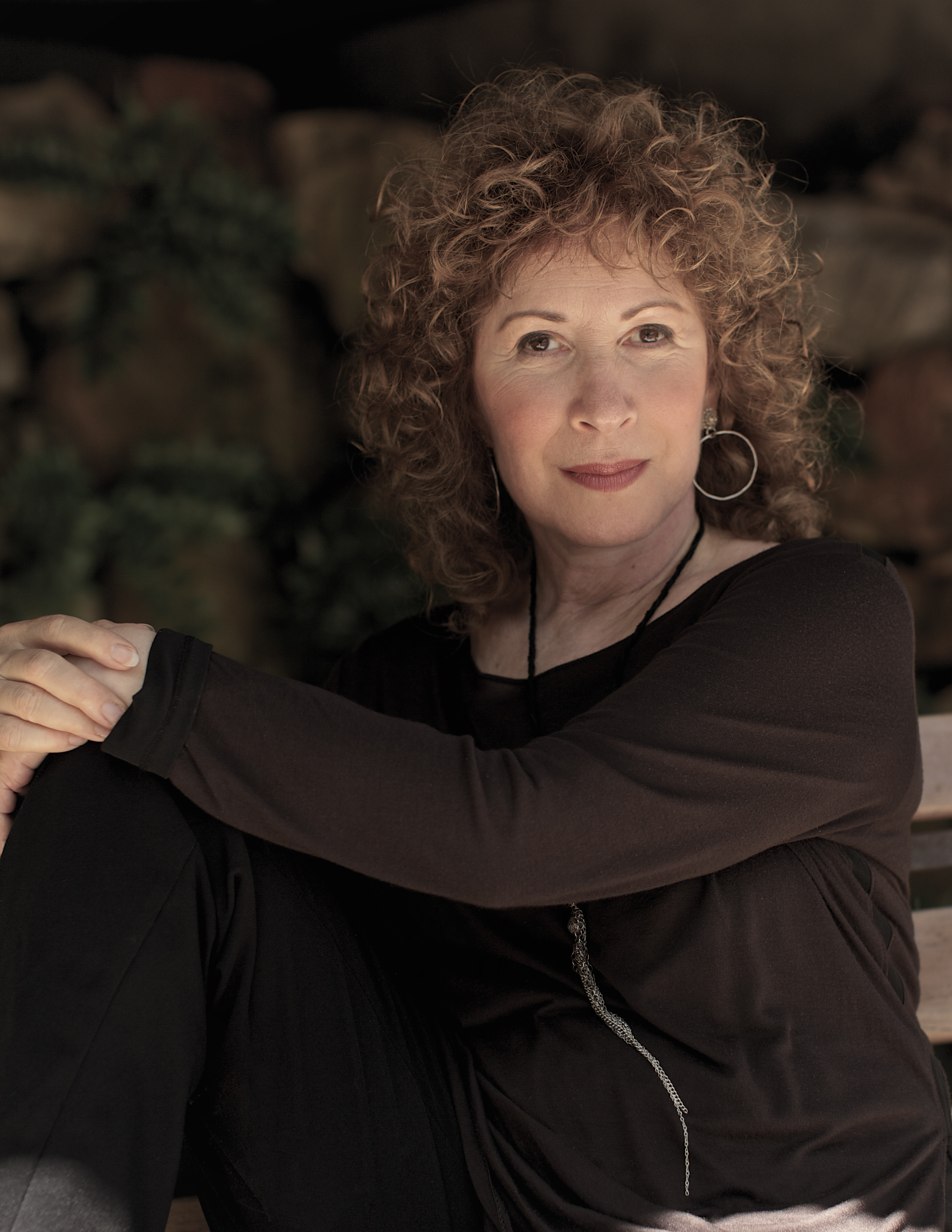
- Hall in 2012

Background information
- Also known as: Lani Hall Alpert
- Born: Leilani Hall; November 6, 1945 (age 80); Chicago, Illinois, U.S.
- Genres: Jazz; Latin; pop; Brazilian
- Occupations: Singer; songwriter
- Years active: 1965–present
- Labels: A&M; Windham Hill; Concord (with Herb Alpert); Shout Factory (with Herb Alpert)
- Spouse(s): Herb Alpert (m. 1974); 1 child

Leilani "Lani" Hall Alpert (née Hall; born November 6, 1945) is an American singer. From 1966 to 1971, she performed as lead vocalist for Sérgio Mendes & Brasil '66. In 1972, Hall released her first solo album, Sun Down Lady. She may be best known, however, for providing the most recognizable female face and vocal signature sound to Mendes' group during her tenure there, and for her rendition of the theme song to the 1983 James Bond film Never Say Never Again, with its accompanying video, in which she prominently appears. In 1986, she was awarded her first Grammy for Es Fácil Amar, as "Best Latin Pop Performance".

After that year, Hall largely retired, resurfacing in 1998 with the solo album Brasil Nativo. She has recorded more than 22 albums in three different languages and has released three albums on which she performs alongside her husband, Herb Alpert: Anything Goes, I Feel You and Steppin' Out. Hall received her second Grammy Award in 2013 as producer of the album Steppin' Out.

== Music career ==
Hall's first public appearance occurred in 1965 at The Centaur, a coffee house in Old Town, Chicago. She was heard by Brazilian pianist and bandleader Sérgio Mendes, who was on tour in Chicago. He first heard her perform at a benefit at Mother Blues, another club in Old Town. His group, Brasil '65, was disbanding, and he invited Hall to come to Los Angeles to be the lead singer of his new project, Sérgio Mendes & Brasil '66. As she was only 19 and still living with her parents, she agreed only after Mendes met her father and obtained his blessing, and six months later, the group signed a contract with A&M Records. Unlike the previous incarnation, Brasil '66 was an instant success – making a significant impact on the charts with its first single, a version of the Brazilian song "Mas Que Nada". Much of the song's appeal was due to Hall's distinctive, multi-tracked vocals and Herb Alpert's expertise as producer.

A series of popular interpretations followed, including the group's take on the Beatles' "The Fool on the Hill" and "Day Tripper". In 1966 the band was the opening act that toured alongside A&M labelmates (and label founder) Herb Alpert and the Tijuana Brass.

In 1970, midway through the production of the folk-rock concept album Stillness, Hall left Brasil '66 and was replaced by Mendes' wife, Gracinha Leporace. Hall embarked on a solo career, with Herb Alpert assuming production duties. She released Sun Down Lady in 1972, followed up by Hello It's Me in 1975. She regularly recorded throughout the 1970s and 1980s, recording the title song for the James Bond film Never Say Never Again in 1983, produced by Mendes and Alpert. Never Say Never Again was the second of only two James Bond films to date not to be produced by EON Productions; coincidentally, Alpert had performed the instrumental theme for the first, 1967's Casino Royale.

Beginning in 1982, Hall recorded several successful Latin pop albums in Spanish, culminating in 1985's Es Fácil Amar, produced by Albert Hammond, for which she received the Grammy Award for Best Latin Pop Performance. Among her Spanish hits were "Un Amor Así" and "De Repente El Amor", duets with Puerto Rican singer José Feliciano and Brazilian singer Roberto Carlos, respectively; "Para Vivir Así," which features Herb Alpert on trumpet; and another duet, "Te Quiero Así" with the iconic Mexican singer José José (who also began his career with a bossa nova/jazz band). She recorded "Corazón Encadenado" and won a Grammy in a duet with Spanish singer Camilo Sesto in 1984, though she doesn't speak Spanish. In 1986, she worked again with Mendes in the song "No Place to Hide" from the Brasil '86 album. In the mid-1980s, Hall contracted a debilitating case of Epstein–Barr virus and was forced to take a break from performing. She returned in 1998 with the album Brasil Nativo on the Windham Hill label. In 2008, she reunited with Mendes again, performing the song "Dreamer" on his album Encanto, which also featured Herb Alpert on trumpet.

In 2007, she and Alpert assembled a band consisting of pianist/composer Bill Cantos, bassist Hussain Jiffry and drummer/percussionist Michael Shapiro, developing new arrangements for jazz standards and Brazilian songs. They have continued to tour, and have released three CDs, Anything Goes in 2009, I Feel You in 2011 and Steppin' Out in 2013, which won a Grammy Award for both Alpert (artist) and Hall (producer).

At the end of 2024, Herb Alpert announced that he was forming a new version of the Tijuana Brass and would take the group on tour in celebration of the 60th Anniversary of his landmark album Whipped Cream and Other Delights. The tour commenced in Clearwater, FL in January 2025. Lani Hall accompanied him on all the shows, performing a medley of four Brasil '66 songs midway through each concert. The tour currently has shows scheduled through September 2026.

== Writing ==
As a young girl, Hall wrote poetry. She began writing short stories in 1982 while on tour in Mexico City. In 2012 she published Emotional Memoirs & Short Stories. Written over the course of more than 30 years, the book contains fiction and nonfiction stories that describe women coping with the vicissitudes of life.

== Personal life ==
On December 15, 1974, Hall married Herb Alpert; they have a daughter, actress Aria Alpert.

== Discography ==
=== Solo albums ===
- 1972 – Sun Down Lady
- 1975 – Hello It's Me
- 1976 – Sweet Bird
- 1979 – Double or Nothing
- 1980 – Blush
- 1981 – A Brazileira (Portuguese)
- 1982 – Albany Park
- 1982 – Lani (Spanish)
- 1984 – Lani Hall (Spanish)
- 1984 – Collectibles
- 1985 – Es Fácil Amar (Spanish)
- 1987 – Classics Volume 19
- 1987 – Lo Mejor De Lani (Spanish)
- 1998 – Brasil Nativo
- 2022 - Seasons of Love (featuring Herb Alpert)

=== Solo singles ===
- 1976 – "Send in the Clowns"
- 1980 – "Come What May"
- 1980 – "I Don't Want You to Go"
- 1981 – "Where's Your Angel?" (peaked at No. 88 on the Billboard Hot 100)
- 1982 – "Te Quiero Así (Duet with Jose Jose)
- 1983 – "Never Say Never Again"
- 1984 – "Para Vivir Así"
- 1984 – "Corazón Encadenado" (Duet with Camilo Sesto)
- 1985 – "De Repente El Amor" (Duet with Roberto Carlos)
- 1985 – "Un Amor Así" (Duet with Jose Feliciano)

=== Collaboration albums ===
==== Albums with Sérgio Mendes and Brasil '66 ====
- 1966 – Herb Alpert Presents Sergio Mendes & Brasil '66
- 1967 – Equinox
- 1968 – Look Around
- 1968 – Fool on the Hill
- 1969 – Crystal Illusions
- 1969 – Ye-Me-Lê
- 1970 – Live at Expo '70
- 1971 – Stillness

==== Albums with Herb Alpert ====
- 1978 – Herb Alpert / Hugh Masekela
- 2009 – Anything Goes
- 2011 – I Feel You
- 2013 – Steppin' Out

== Bibliography ==
- Hall Alpert, Lani (2012). Emotional Memoirs & Short Stories. Lani Hall Alpert. ASIN B009BI8TXW.
