= Brasil '86 =

Studio album by Sérgio Mendes
- Released: 1986
- Recorded: 1986
- Studio: Bill Schnee Studios (North Hollywood, California); Soundcastle (Santa Monica, California)
- Genre: Jazz; soft rock
- Label: A&M; SP-5135
- Producer: Peter Wolf; Sergio Mendes

Sérgio Mendes chronology
Confetti (1984)	Brasil '86 (1986)	Arara (1989)

Brasil '86 is an album by Sérgio Mendes. The album is best known for four songs by different vocalists: "Daylight" sung by Siedah Garrett, "Your Smile" by Gracinha Leporace, "No Place to Hide" by Lani Hall, and "What Do We Mean to Each Other", a duet by Lisa Bevill and Joe Pizzulo, which charted at No. 19 on the Billboard Adult Contemporary chart in 1987 (No. 16 on the Radio & Records AC chart). The first single released in 1986, "Take This Love" (which is sung by Pizzulo and features Michael McDonald on backing vocals) charted at No. 14 on Billboard's AC chart and charted at No. 9 on the R&R AC chart.

== Track list ==
1. "Daylight" (Diane Warren, Peter Wolf, Sergio Mendes) 4:30
2. "Take This Love" (John Parker, Peter Beckett) 4:20
3. "What Do We Mean to Each Other" (P. Wolf, Ina Wolf) 4:35
4. "Your Smile" ("Estrela Da Terra") (Dori Caymmi, Paulo César Pinheiro) (I. Wolf – English lyrics) 3:30
5. "The River" ("O Rio") (Caymmi) (Fernando Pessoa – poem lyrics) 2:35
6. "Nonstop" (Bob Marlette, Sue Shifrin) 3:23
7. "It Hurts a Whole Lot More" (Tom Snow) 4:13
8. "Flower of Bahia" ("Flor Da Bahia") (Caymmi, Pinheiro) 4:19
9. "No Place to Hide" ("Velho Piano") (Caymmi, Pinheiro) 2:49
10. "Here Where I Belong" (Snow) 4:13

== Personnel ==
Musicians

- Sérgio Mendes – keyboards (1–5, 7–10), Synclavier (1–5, 7–10), acoustic piano (10), arrangements (1, 4, 5, 8–10)
- Peter Wolf – keyboards, Synclavier, Synclavier bass (3, 5–7), Synclavier drums (3, 6, 7), effects (10), arrangements (all tracks)
- Dann Huff – guitars (1–4, 6–9)
- Dori Caymmi – acoustic guitar (3–5, 8, 9), arrangements (4, 5, 8, 9)
- Nathan East – bass (2, 8, 9)
- Alphonso Johnson – bass (4)
- Jeff Porcaro – drums (1, 2, 8, 9), percussion (5)
- Paulinho da Costa – percussion (1–3, 6, 8)
- Ernie Watts – saxophone solo (2, 3)

Vocals

- Gracinha Leporace - vocals (1, 4, 6, 8)
- Siedah Garrett - vocals (1, 6), background vocals (2–4, 7)
- Joe Pizzulo - vocals (2, 3, 8, 10), background vocals (2–4, 7, 8)
- Lisa Bevill - vocals (3), background vocals (3, 7)
- Dori Caymmi - vocals (5)
- Lani Hall - vocals (9)
- Maxine Waters Willard - vocals (6), background vocals (2)
- Julia Waters - background vocals (2)
- Phillip Ingram - background vocals (2)
- Phil Perry - background vocals (2, 3)
- Michael McDonald - background vocals (2, 3, 7)
- Robin Beck - background vocals (3, 7)
- Kate Markowitz - background vocals (4)

Production

- Sérgio Mendes – producer
- Peter Wolf – producer
- Paul Erickson – engineer
- Brian Malouf – engineer, mixing at Can-Am Recorders (Tarzana, California)
- Thom Perry – engineer
- Bruce Swedien – engineer
- David Bowman – assistant engineer
- Michael Bowman – assistant engineer
- Dan Garcia – assistant engineer
- Bernie Grundman – mastering at Bernie Grundman Mastering (Hollywood, California)
- Chuck Beeson – art direction, design
- Tom Nordstrom – painting
