= Sérgio Mendes =

Brazilian musician (1941–2024)

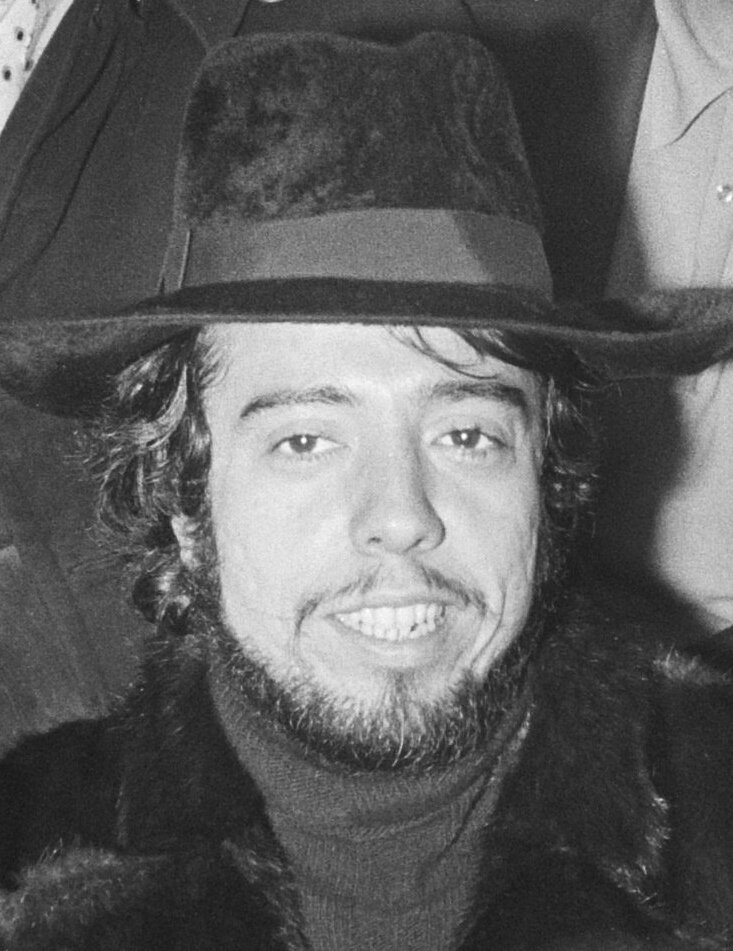
- Mendes in 1971

Background information
- Also known as: Santos Sergio
- Born: Sérgio Santos Mendes; 11 February 1941; Niterói, Rio de Janeiro, Third Brazilian Republic
- Died: 5 September 2024 (aged 83) Los Angeles, California, U.S.
- Genres: Bossa nova; Latin jazz; disco; adult contemporary; soft rock
- Occupations: Bandleader; pianist; composer; arranger; songwriter
- Instrument: Piano
- Works: Sérgio Mendes discography
- Years active: 1961–2023
- Labels: Capitol; Atlantic; A&M; Elektra; Concord
- Spouse: Gracinha Leporace

Sérgio Santos Mendes (Brazilian Portuguese: [ˈsɛʁʒju ˈsɐ̃tuz ˈmẽdʒis]; 11 February 1941 – 5 September 2024) was a Brazilian musician.

His career took off with worldwide hits by his band Brasil '66. He released 35 albums and was known for playing bossa nova, often mixed with funk. He was nominated for an Oscar for Best Original Song in 2012 as a co-writer of "Real in Rio" from the animated film Rio.

Mendes was primarily known in the United States, where his albums were recorded and where most of his touring took place. He was married to Gracinha Leporace, who performed with him from the early 1970s. Mendes collaborated with many artists, including Black Eyed Peas, with whom he re-recorded in 2006 a remake of his 1966 version of the song "Mas que nada", which was a breakthrough hit for him.

== Biography ==
=== Early career ===
Mendes was born in Niterói, east across Guanabara Bay from Rio de Janeiro, on 11 February 1941. As he related in In the Key of Joy, a biopic about his career, he had to wear a cast for three years because he had osteomyelitis. His father was a doctor, and he was one of the first people in Brazil to be given penicillin. Sergio studied classical music at the local conservatory with hopes of becoming a classical pianist. As his interest in jazz grew, he started playing in nightclubs in the late 1950s at the time that bossa nova, a jazz-infused derivative of samba, was emerging.

Sergio Mendes played with Antônio Carlos Jobim, who was regarded as a mentor, and U.S. jazz musicians who toured Brazil. Mendes formed the Sexteto Bossa Rio and recorded Dance Moderno in 1961. He toured Europe and the United States where he recorded albums with Cannonball Adderley and Herbie Mann. In 1962 he played in a bossa nova festival at Carnegie Hall. Mendes moved to the U.S. in 1964 and cut two albums under the group name Sergio Mendes & Brasil '65 with Capitol Records and Atlantic Records.

Mendes formed a partnership with Richard Adler, a Brooklyn-born American who had brought Bossa Trés and two dancers, Joe Bennett and a Brazilian partner, to appear on The Ed Sullivan Show in 1963. He was accompanied by Jobim, Flavio Ramos and Aloísio de Oliveira, a record and TV producer from Rio who had been a member of Carmen Miranda's backing group Bando da Lua. The Musicians Union only allowed this group to appear on one TV show and to make one club appearance (Basin Street East) before ordering them to leave the U.S. When the new group Brasil '65 was formed, Shelly Manne, Bud Shank and other West Coast musicians enrolled Mendes and the other band members into the local musicians' union. Adler and Mendes formed Brasil '65, which consisted of Wanda Sá and Rosinha de Valença, as well as the Sergio Mendes Trio. The group recorded albums for Atlantic and Capitol.

=== Brasil '66 ===
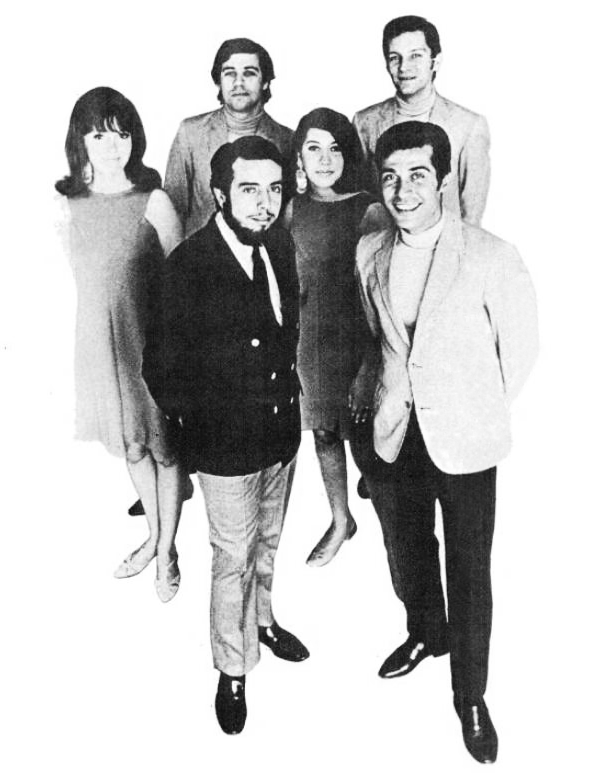
Sergio Mendes & Brasil '66

Mendes' jazz albums for Atlantic Records, through Nesuhi and Ahmet Ertegun, had low sales. Adler suggested that Mendes and the group sing in English as well as Portuguese, as Mendes had demanded, and Adler provided new English-based material such as "Goin' Out of My Head" by Teddy Randazzo and Bobby Weinstein. In order to sing these songs properly in English, Adler suggested that the group find two American female singers to sing in both English and Portuguese. Adler contacted his friend Jerry Dennon and A&M Records founders Herb Alpert and Jerry Moss, and arranged for an audition for Mendes' new group, which was named "Brasil '66.'" Alpert and Moss signed Mendes and his group to A&M Records. Adler asked the Ertegun Brothers at Atlantic Records to release Mendes from his Atlantic Jazz contract. Ahmet agreed to allow him to record albums under the name "Sergio Mendes and Brasil '66" with A&M. Mendes was not at this meeting. Alpert took over as producer for the A&M albums and the group became a huge success with their first single, "Mas que nada", by composer and singer Jorge Ben.

The first album on A&M was Herb Alpert Presents Sergio Mendes & Brasil '66, an album that went platinum as a result of the success of the single "Mas que nada" and the personal support of Alpert, with whom Mendes toured. The original lineup of Brasil '66 was Mendes (piano), vocalists Lani Hall (later Alpert's wife) and Sylvia Dulce Kleiner (Bibi Vogel) (1942–2004), Bob Matthews (1935–2022) (bass), José Soares (percussion) and João Palma (1943–2016) (drums). John Pisano (1931–2024) played guitar. The new lineup recorded two albums between 1966 and 1968, including the best-selling Look Around LP, before a major personnel change for its fourth album Fool on the Hill.

Mendes often changed the band's lineup. Vocalist Kleiner (Bibi Vogel) was replaced by Janis Hansen, who in turn was replaced by Karen Philipp. Veteran drummer Dom Um Romão teamed with Rubens Bassini to assume percussionist duties. Claudio Slon joined the group as drummer in 1969 and played with Mendes for nearly a decade. Sebastião Neto took over on bass and Oscar Castro-Neves took on guitar. These changes gave the group a more orchestral sound. In the early 1970s, lead singer Hall pursued a solo career and became Alpert's second wife. Some accounts claim that Mendes was upset with Alpert for years for "stealing" Hall away from his group. Kevyn Lettau sang and toured with Mendes for eight years after being discovered by him in 1984.

Though his early singles with Brasil '66, most notably "Mas que nada", met with some success, Mendes burst into mainstream prominence when he performed the Oscar-nominated "The Look of Love" on the Academy Awards telecast in April 1968. Brasil '66's version of the song quickly shot into the top 10, peaking at No. 4 and eclipsing Dusty Springfield's version from the soundtrack of the movie Casino Royale. Mendes spent the rest of 1968 enjoying consecutive top 10 and top 20 hits with his follow-up singles "The Fool on the Hill" and "Scarborough Fair". From 1968 on, Mendes was a major Brazilian star and enjoyed immense popularity worldwide, performing in venues as varied as stadium arenas and the White House, where he gave concerts for presidents Lyndon B. Johnson and Richard Nixon. The Brasil '66 group appeared at the World Expo in Osaka, Japan in June 1970.

=== Renewed success ===
Mendes' career in the U.S. stalled in the mid-1970s, but he remained popular in South America and Japan. On his two albums with Bell Records in 1973 and 1974 and several for Elektra from 1975 such as "Brasil '88", Mendes continued to mine the best in American pop music and post-bossa writers of his native Brazil, while forging new directions in soul with collaborators like Stevie Wonder, who wrote Mendes' R&B-inflected minor hit "The Real Thing".

In 1983, he rejoined Alpert's A&M records and enjoyed success with a self-titled album and several follow-up albums, all of which received considerable adult contemporary airplay with charting singles. "Never Gonna Let You Go", featuring vocals by Joe Pizzulo and Leeza Miller, equalled the success of his 1968 single "The Look of Love" by reaching No. 4 on the Billboard Hot 100 chart; it also spent four weeks atop the Billboard adult contemporary chart. In 1984, he recorded the Confetti album which had the hit songs "Olympia", which was also used as a theme song for the Olympic Games that year, and "Alibis" which reached #5 on the A/C chart and #29 on the Hot 100. In the 1980s Mendes worked again with singer Lani Hall on the song "No Place to Hide" from the Brasil '86 album, and produced her vocals on the title song for the James Bond film Never Say Never Again.

By the time Mendes released his Grammy-winning Elektra album Brasileiro in 1992, he was the undisputed master of pop-inflected Brazilian jazz. The late-1990s lounge music revival brought retrospection and respect to Mendes' oeuvre, particularly the classic Brasil '66 albums.

In the 4th season of Seinfeld, during the episode titled "The Old Man", Mendes is mentioned when Kramer and Newman try and sell their used records to a record store. Because of his popularity in South America, Kramer and Newman feel they should have received more money on their trade-in.

=== Later career ===
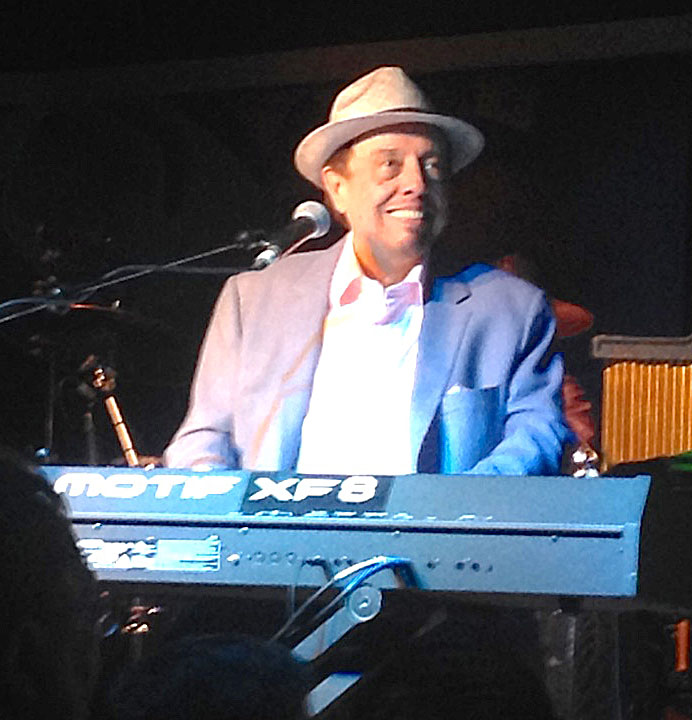
Mendes in concert, 2016

The 2006 album Timeless featured a wide array of neo-soul and alternative hip hop guest artists, including the Black Eyed Peas, Erykah Badu, Black Thought, Jill Scott, Chali 2na of Jurassic 5, India.Arie, John Legend, Justin Timberlake, Q-Tip, Stevie Wonder and Pharoahe Monch. It was released on 14 February 2006, by Concord Records.

The 2006 re-recorded version of "Mas que Nada" with the Black Eyed Peas had additional vocals by Gracinha Leporace (Mendes' wife) and this version was included on Timeless. In Brazil, the song became the theme song of the local television channel Globo's Estrelas. The Black Eyed Peas' version contained a sample of their 2004 hit "Hey Mama". The re-recorded song became popular on European charts. On the UK Singles Chart, the song entered at No. 29 and peaked at No. 6 in its second week on the chart.

In 2013, Mendes made an appearance dancing to one of the segments of Pharrell Williams' "24 Hours of Happy." In 2012, he was nominated for an Oscar for Best Original Song as co-writer of "Real in Rio" from the animated film Rio. He was the co-producer on the soundtrack albums for two animated films about his homeland: 2011's Rio and its 2014 sequel. He was the subject of the 2020 documentary Sergio Mendes in the Key of Joy. Mendes gave his final performances in November 2023. He played bossa nova which was often combined with funk. He had released 35 albums.

=== Death ===
Mendes died from complications of long COVID at a hospital in Los Angeles on 5 September 2024, at the age of 83.

== Discography ==
- 1961: Dance Moderno (Philips)
- 1962: Cannonball's Bossa Nova (Riverside/Capitol Records)
- 1963: Você Ainda Não Ouviu Nada! (a.k.a., The Beat of Brazil) (Philips)
- 1965: In Person at El Matador (Atlantic)
- 1965: Brasil '65 (a.k.a. In The Brazilian Bag) (Capitol)
- 1965: The Great Arrival (Atlantic)
- 1966: The Swinger from Rio (a.k.a., Bossa Nova York) (Atlantic)
- 1966: Herb Alpert Presents Sergio Mendes & Brasil '66 (A&M)
- 1967: Equinox (A&M)
- 1967: Quiet Nights (Philips)
- 1967: Look Around (A&M)
- 1968: Fool on the Hill (A&M)
- 1968: Sérgio Mendes' Favorite Things (Atlantic)
- 1969: Crystal Illusions (A&M)
- 1969: Ye-Me-Lê (A&M)
- 1969: The Story of... Sérgio Mendes and Brasil '77 (a.k.a., Italia – Brazil, A&M)
- 1970: Live at Expo '70 (unreleased in the US, A&M)
- 1970: Stillness (A&M)
- 1971: País Tropical (A&M)
- 1972: Foursider (A&M, double compilation album)
- 1972: Primal Roots (a.k.a., Raízes – Brazil) (A&M)
- 1973: Love Music (Bell)
- 1974: Vintage 74 (Bell)
- 1975: Sérgio Mendes (a.k.a., I Believe – Brazil) (Elektra)
- 1976: Homecooking (Elektra)
- 1977: Sergio Mendes and the New Brasil '77 (Elektra)
- 1977: Pelé (Atlantic)
- 1978: Brasil '88 (Elektra)
- 1979: Alegria (a.k.a., Horizonte Aberto – Brazil) (WEA)
- 1979: Magic Lady (Elektra)
- 1980: The Beat of Brazil (Atlantic)
- 1983: Sérgio Mendes (A&M)
- 1984: Confetti (A&M)
- 1986: Brasil '86 (A&M)
- 1989: Arara (A&M)
- 1992: Brasileiro (Elektra)
- 1996: Oceano (Verve)
- 1999: Matrix (Concord)
- 2006: Timeless (Concord)
- 2007: Encanto (Concord)
- 2009: Bom Tempo (Concord)
- 2014: Magic (Okeh)
- 2020: In the Key of Joy (Concord)

== Awards ==
=== Academy Awards ===
Year	Category	Work	Result
2011	Best Original Song	"Real in Rio"	Nominated

=== Grammy Awards ===
Year	Category	Recipient	Outcome
1969	Best Pop Performance by a Duo or Group with Vocals	The Fool on the Hill	Nominated
1993	Best World Music Album	Brasileiro	Won
2007	Best Urban/Alternative Performance	"Mas que Nada" featuring Black Eyed Peas	Nominated
2007	Best Urban/Alternative Performance	"That Heat" featuring Erykah Badu and will.i.am	Nominated
2011	Best Contemporary World Music Album	Bom tempo	Nominated
2015	Best World Music Album	Magic	Nominated

=== Latin Grammy Awards ===
Year	Category	Recipient	Outcome
2005	Lifetime Achievement Award	Himself	Nominated
2006	Record of the Year	"Mas que Nada" featuring Black Eyed Peas	Nominated
2006	Best Brazilian Contemporary Pop Album	Timeless	Won
2008	Best Brazilian Song	"Acode" featuring Vanessa da Mata	Nominated
2010	Best Brazilian Contemporary Pop Album	Bom Tempo	Won

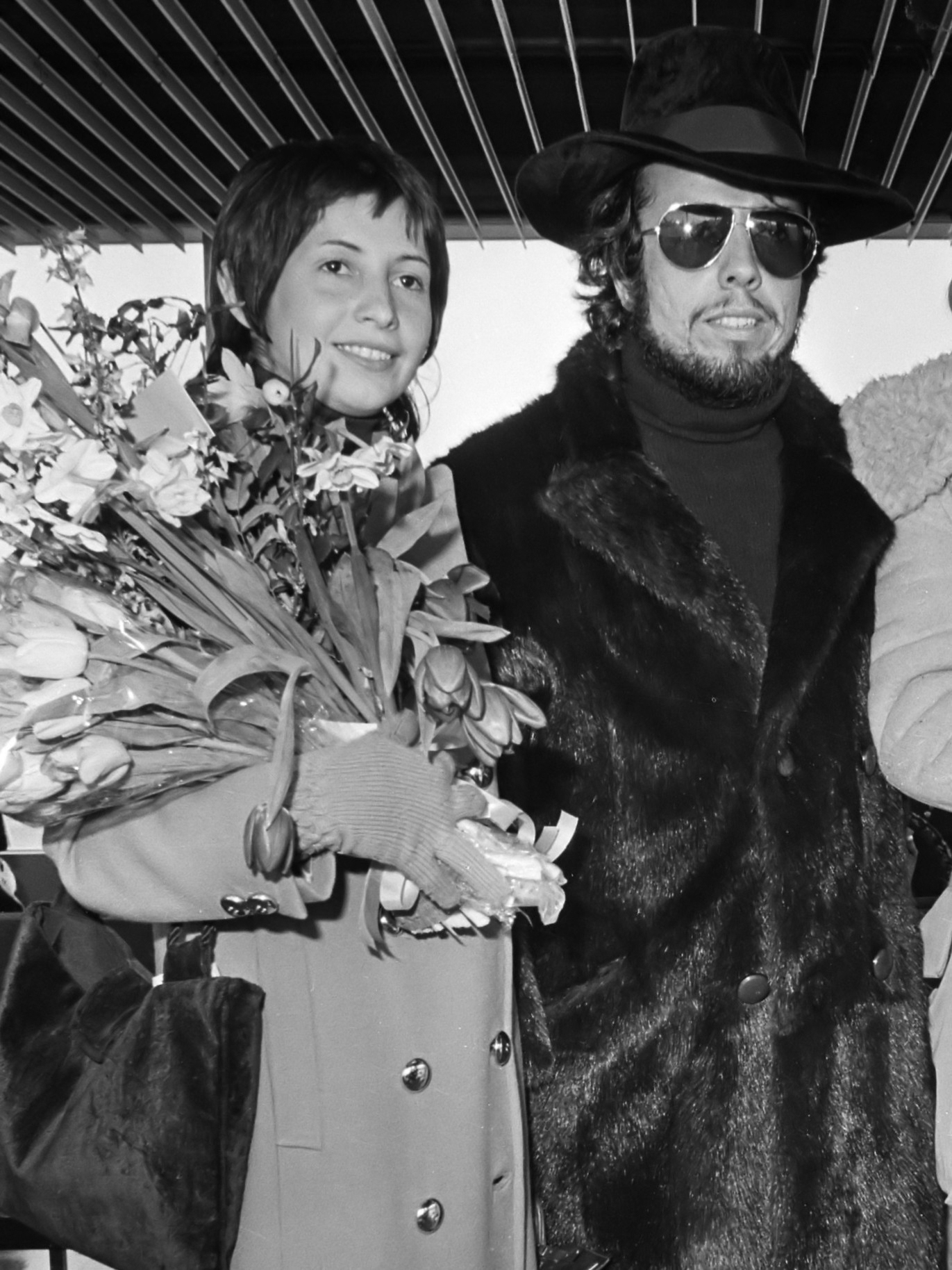
Gracinha Leporace and Mendes, 1971

== See also ==
- List of Brazilian musicians
