= Fool on the Hill (album) =

Studio album by Sérgio Mendes
- Released: 1968
- Recorded: 1968
- Studio: A&M (Hollywood, California)
- Genre: Bossa nova
- Label: A&M; SP-4160
- Producer: Sérgio Mendes

Sérgio Mendes chronology
| Look Around (1967) | Fool on the Hill (1968) | Crystal Illusions (1969) |

Professional ratings
Review scores
| Source | Rating |
|---|---|
| Allmusic | 4.5/5 stars |

Fool on the Hill is the fourth studio album by Sérgio Mendes and Brasil '66, released in 1968.

This is the first album featuring the second edition of Brasil '66. Mendes replaced all of the original band members (with the exception of lead singer Lani Hall). The dismissed members went on to form the short-lived group, The Carnival, which released one self-titled album in 1969. This is also the first appearance of Gracinha Leporace on a Sérgio Mendes album.

The album features two top 40 pop singles: the title track and "Scarborough Fair". The traditional English folk song (covered notably by Simon & Garfunkel) was featured in both the trailer and the soundtrack for the 1973 film Heavy Traffic.

== Track listing ==
1. "The Fool on the Hill" (John Lennon, Paul McCartney) – 3:15
2. "Festa" (Dori Caymmi, Paulo César Pinheiro, Lani Hall) – 4:18
3. "Casa Forte" (Edu Lobo) – 4:04
4. "Canto Triste" (Lobo, Vinícius de Moraes, Hall) – 4:17
5. "Upa, Neguinho" (Lobo, Gianfrancesco Guarnieri) – 2:54
6. "Lapinha" (Baden Powell, Paulo César Pinheiro) – 3:08
7. "Scarborough Fair" (Traditional, arranged by Paul Simon and Art Garfunkel) – 3:19
8. "When Summer Turns To Snow" (Dave Grusin, Alan and Marilyn Bergman) – 5:07
9. "Laia Ladaia" (Reza) (Lobo, Ruy Guerra, Norman Gimbel) – 3:13

== Personnel ==
- Sérgio Mendes – Piano, vocals, arranger, producer
- Lani Hall – Vocals
- Karen Philipp – Vocals
- John Pisano – Guitar
- Rubens Bassini – Percussion
- Sebastiao Neto – Bass
- Dom Um Romao – Percussion, drums
- Gracinha Leporace (shown as "Leporael" on the original album cover credits) – Vocal on "Lapinha"
- Oscar Castro-Neves – Guitar on "Lapinha"

Production

- Sérgio Mendes – Producer, Arranger
- Dave Grusin – Orchestra Arranger, Conductor
- Henry Lewy, Herb Alpert, Larry Levine – Engineer
- Tom Wilkes – Art Direction
- Guy Webster – Photography
- Bob Gordan – Photography (Figure Study)

== Charts ==
| Chart (1967) | position |
|---|---|
| US Billboard 200 | 3 |
| US Top Jazz Albums (Billboard) | 1 |
| US Top R&B/Hip-Hop Albums (Billboard) | 10 |

== Certifications ==
| Region | Certification | Certified units/sales |
|---|---|---|
| United Kingdom (BPI) | Gold | 100,000^{^} |
^{^} Shipments figures based on certification alone.
