= Sérgio Mendes' Favorite Things =

Studio album by Sérgio Mendes
- Released: 1968
- Genre: Bossa nova
- Label: Atlantic
- Producer: Nesuhi Ertegün

Sérgio Mendes chronology
The Great Arrival (1966)	Sérgio Mendes' Favorite Things (1968)	Sergio Mendes (1975)

Sérgio Mendes' Favorite Things is a 1968 album by Sérgio Mendes. It includes his rendition of My Favorite Things (song), which Rolling Stone considered his first foray away from pure Bossa nova towards an inclusion of American popular music.

== Track listing ==
1. "My Favorite Things" (Richard Rodgers, Oscar Hammerstein)
2. "Tempo Feliz (Happy Times)" (Baden Powell, Vinícius de Moraes)
3. "Ponteio" (José Carlos Capinam, Edu Lobo)
4. "Veleiro (The Sailboat)" (Edu Lobo, Torquato Neto)
5. "A Banda" (Chico Buarque)
6. "I Say a Little Prayer" (Burt Bacharach, Hal David)
7. "Comin' Home Baby" (Bob Dorough, Ben Tucker)
8. "Boa Palavra (The Good Word)" (Caetano Veloso)
9. "O Mar é Meu Chão (The Sea is My Soil)" (Nelson Motta, Dori Caymmi)
10. "So What's New" (John Pisano)
