= Brasil '88 =

Studio album by Sérgio Mendes
- Released: 1978
- Genre: Bossa nova
- Labels: Elektra; 6E-134
- Producer: Sérgio Mendes

Sérgio Mendes chronology
Pelé (1977)	Brasil '88 (1978)	Alegria (1979)

Brasil '88 is the 1978 studio album by Sérgio Mendes. This album features vocals by Marietta Waters, Carol Rogers and Cruz Baca.

== Track listing ==
#	Title	Writer(s)	Time
1	"Bridges (Travessia)"	Milton Nascimento, Fernando Brant	4:39
2	"Waters of March (Águas de Março)"	Antonio Carlos Jobim	3:51
3	"That's Enough for Me"	Dave Grusin, Patti Austin	3:52
4	"Misturada (Jumble)"	Airto Moreira	2:59
5	"One More Lie"	Ralph Dino, John Sembello	3:39
6	"Midnight Lovers"	Ralph Dino, John Sembello	3:21
7	"Harley"	John Sembello	3:02
8	"Tiro Cruzado (Cross Fire)"	Márcio Borges, Nelson Ângelo	3:18
9	"Life Goes On"	Bernard Ighner	3:57

== Personnel ==
- Keyboards - Sérgio Mendes
- Bass - Nathan Watts
- Drums - Raymond Pounds, Alex Acuña
- Guitar - Michael Sembello, Oscar Castro-Neves, Nelson Angelo
- Percussion - Laudir de Oliveira, Naná Vasconcelos, Emil Richards, Kenneth Nash, Sérgio Mendes
- Vocals - Marietta Waters, Carol Rogers
- Violin - Harry Bluestone, Paul Shure, Nathan Ross, Murray Adler, Henry Ferber, Shirley Cornell, Gordon Marron, Israel Baker, Arnold Belnick, Stanley Plummer, Assa Drori, Ralph Silverman, Sheldon Sanov, Ronald Folson, Don Palmer, Carl La Magna, David Frisina, Tibor Zelig
- Viola - David Schwartz, Richard Dickler, Virginia Majewski, Samuel Boghossian, Gareth Nuttycombe, Alan Harshman, Rollice Dale
- Cello - Jeff Solow, Douglas Davis, Raymond Kelley, Edgar Lustgarden
- Harp - Dorothy Remsen
- Flute and piccolo - Bud Shank, Gene Cipriano, Terry Harrington, Ted Nash, Ronald Langinger, Jerome Richardson, Ernie Watts, Don Menza
- Trumpet and flugelhorn - Chuck Findley
- Trombone - Frank Rosolino
- Baritone sax - Ernie Watts
- Tenor sax - Don Menza
- Soprano sax - Jerome Richardson
- French horn - David Duke, Richard Perissi, Vincent DeRosa
- Horn and string arrangements - Richard Hazard
- Orchestra manager - Ben Barrett
