= Night and Day (song) =

1932 song by Cole Porter

Single by Fred Astaire with Leo Reisman and His Orchestra
- B-side: I've Got You On My Mind
- Published: November 18, 1932 by Harms, Inc., New York
- Released: January 13, 1933
- Recorded: November 22, 1932
- Studio: RCA Victor 24th Street, New York City
- Genre: Popular music, musical theatre
- Length: 3:28
- Label: Victor 24193
- Songwriter: Cole Porter

"Night and Day" is a popular song by Cole Porter that was written for the 1932 musical Gay Divorce. It is perhaps Porter's most popular contribution to the Great American Songbook and has been recorded by dozens of musicians. NPR says "within three months of the show's opening, more than 30 artists had recorded the song."

Fred Astaire introduced "Night and Day" on November 29, 1932, when Gay Divorce opened at the Ethel Barrymore Theatre.

The song was so associated with Porter that when Hollywood filmed his life story in 1946, with Cary Grant, the movie was entitled Night and Day.

== Fred Astaire recordings ==
A week before the musical Gay Divorce opened in November 1932, Astaire gathered with Leo Reisman and his orchestra at Victor's Gramercy Recording Studio in Manhattan to make a record of two Cole Porter compositions, "Night and Day" backed with "I've Got You on My Mind". All was done under the shadow cast by the 1929 stock market crash, which had spawned the Great Depression, a severe economic downturn that lasted through the 1930s. In just over two years, record industry revenues had fallen from $100 million to $6 million, driving all but three companies (RCA Victor, American Record Corporation (ARC) and Columbia) out of business. The single was released as Victor 24193 on January 13, 1933, and it went on to become the top selling record of the year, with 22,811 copies sold.

On May 23, 1933, Astaire recorded it again (due to anti-trust concerns) for Columbia Graphophone Company Ltd., which was now a part of Electric and Musical Industries (EMI). It was released in the United Kingdom in October on Columbia DB 1215, backed with "After You, Who?", another Porter composition. Reisman, under contract to RCA Victor, was unable to accompany Astaire on this record. It can be distinguished from the US version because it is fifteen seconds shorter (3:10).

Another Fred Astaire version in circulation is from the soundtrack of the 1934 motion picture The Gay Divorcee, starring Fred Astaire and Ginger Rogers. After the film opened on October 19, this version was released, and has appeared on record albums over the years. It is almost five minutes long, and Astaire sings and dances for the duration. Astaire is accompanied by Max Steiner and the RKO Radio Studio Orchestra.

The next release was recorded in December 1952 and released the following year in a four LP set called The Astaire Story, which provided an overview of songs Astaire had performed during his career. The musicians included Oscar Peterson and all the songs were fresh recordings. This version of "Night and Day" was over five minutes long.

== Inspiration for the song ==
There are several accounts about the song's origin. One mentions that Porter was inspired by an Islamic prayer when he visited Morocco. Another account says he was inspired by the Moorish architecture of the Alcazar Hotel in Cleveland Heights, Ohio. Others mention that he was inspired by a mosaic in the Mausoleum of Galla Placidia, having visited Ravenna during his honeymoon trip to Italy.

== Song structure ==
The construction of "Night and Day" is unusual for a hit song of the 1930s. Most popular tunes then featured 32-bar choruses, divided into four 8-bar sections, usually with an AABA musical structure, the B section representing the bridge. However, Porter's song has a chorus of 48 bars, divided into six sections of eight bars—ABABCB—with section C representing the bridge.

== Harmonic structure ==
"Night and Day" has unusual chord changes (the underlying harmony).

The tune begins with a pedal (repeated) dominant with a major seventh chord built on the flattened sixth of the key, which then resolves to the dominant seventh in the next bar. If performed in the key of B♭, the first chord is therefore G♭ major seventh, with an F (the major seventh above the harmonic root) in the melody, before resolving to F7 and eventually B♭ maj7.

This section repeats and is followed by a descending harmonic sequence starting with a -7♭5 (half diminished seventh chord or Ø) built on the augmented fourth of the key, and descending by semitones—with changes in the chord quality—to the supertonic minor seventh, which forms the beginning of a more standard II-V-I progression. In B♭, this sequence begins with an EØ, followed by an E♭-7, D-7 and D♭ dim, before resolving onto C-7 (the supertonic minor seventh) and cadencing onto B♭.

The bridge is also unusual, with an immediate, fleeting and often (depending on the version) unprepared key change up a minor third, before an equally transient and unexpected return to the key centre. In B♭, the bridge begins with a D♭ major seventh, then moves back to B♭ with a B♭ major seventh chord. This repeats, and is followed by a recapitulation of the second section outlined above.

The vocal verse is also unusual in that most of the melody consists entirely of a single note repeated 35 times —the same dominant pedal that begins the body of the song—with rather inconclusive and unusual harmonies underneath.

== Astaire and Rogers dance in The Gay Divorcee ==
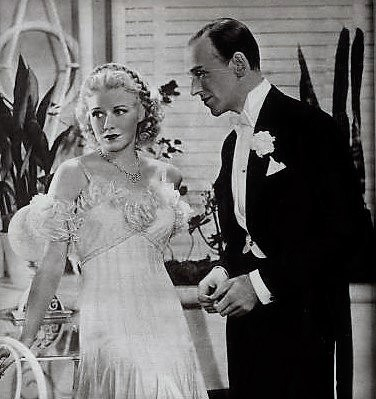
Fred Astaire as Guy Holden and Ginger Rogers as Mimi Glossop

Ginger Rogers and Fred Astaire danced to "Night and Day" in the 1934 film The Gay Divorcee. It was their first romantic dance duet in film and their first dance together in leading roles. Dance critic Alastair Macaulay wrote that this movie, and this dance number in particular, created one of the archetypes of romance, and that cinema "has never had another couple who enshrined romantic love so definitively in terms of dance." Film critic David Denby called "Night and Day" "Cole Porter's greatest song" and the Astaire–Rogers dance duet a vision of the sublime. Music critic Will Friedwald said that by the end of the number, "she's not only in his arms, but the look she gives him ... is one of the defining moments of the entire series of Fred-and-Ginger film pairings."

== Billie Holiday ==
Billie Holiday recorded the song on more than one occasion. A single was recorded on December 13, 1939, in New York, with "The Man I Love" as a B-side, on the Vocalion label, with Walter Page on bass, Joe Sullivan on piano, Jo Jones on drums, Earle Warren on alto sax, Lester Young on tenor sax, Jack Washington on baritone sax, Buck Clayton and Harry Edison on trumpet and Freddie Green on guitar. In her autobiography, Lady Sings the Blues (1956), Holiday said "Night and Day" was "the toughest song in the world for me to sing."

== Charting recordings ==
- Frank Sinatra recorded the song at least five times; the version with Axel Stordahl in his first solo session in 1942 reached the No. 16 spot in the U.S.
- Bing Crosby recorded the song on February 11, 1944, and it appeared on the Billboard chart briefly in 1946 with a peak position of No. 21.
- Bill Evans recorded the tune for the 1959 album Everybody Digs Bill Evans.
- Sergio Mendes & Brasil '66 released the song as a bossa nova and jazz-influenced single from their 1967 album Equinox. It went to number eight on the US adult contemporary chart.
- Everything but the Girl chose this song for their first single in 1983. It reached No. 92 in August 1982.
- Irish rock band U2 recorded a version of the song that was included on the 1990 Red Hot + Blue benefit compilation album to fight AIDS. It reached number two on the US Billboard Modern Rock Tracks chart.
