= Dance Moderno =

Studio album by Sérgio Mendes
- Released: 1961
- Genre: Bossa nova
- Length: 29:06

Sérgio Mendes chronology
Dance Moderno (1961)	Quiet Nights (1963)

Dance Moderno is the first album by Sérgio Mendes. It is purely an instrumental album, featuring his first band, the Sexteto Bossa Rio.

== Track listing ==
1. "Oba-lá-lá" (João Gilberto)
2. "Love for Sale" (Cole Porter)
3. "Tristeza de Nós Dois" (Durval Ferreira & Bebeto)
4. "What Is This Thing Called Love?" (Cole Porter)
5. "Olhou Para Mim" (Ed Lincoln & Silvio César)
6. "Satin Doll" (Duke Ellington & Billy Strayhorn)
7. "Tema Sem Palavras" (Maurício Einhorn & Durval Ferreira)
8. "On Green Dolphin Street" (Bronislau Kaper, Ned Washington)
9. "Outra Vez" (Antônio Carlos Jobim)
10. "Disa" (Maurício Einhorn & Johnny Alf)
11. "Nica's Dream" (Horace Silver)
12. "Diagonal" (Maurício Einhorn & Durval Ferreira)
