= Timeless (Sérgio Mendes album) =

Studio album by Sérgio Mendes
- Released: February 13, 2006
- Recorded: September 2004 – January 2006
- Length: 62:14
- Labels: Concord; will.i.am CCD-2263-2
- Producers: will.i.am, Sérgio Mendes

Singles from Timeless
- 1. "Mas que Nada" Released: May 29, 2006; 2. "That Heat" Released: August 4, 2006; 3. "Yes Yes, Y'all" Released: December 1, 2006

Professional ratings
Aggregate scores
Source	Rating
Metacritic	60/100
Review scores
Source	Rating
AllMusic	3/5 stars
Okayplayer	4/5 stars
Rolling Stone	3/5 stars

Timeless is the thirty-fifth studio album by Brazilian artist Sérgio Mendes. It was produced by American rapper, songwriter and producer will.i.am. The album was released in the UK on February 13, 2006 and in the US on February 14. The album features many artists, including John Legend, Q-Tip and Justin Timberlake.

== Track listing ==
No.	Title	Length
1.	"Mas Que Nada" (featuring The Black Eyed Peas)	4:22
2.	"That Heat" (featuring Erykah Badu and will.i.am)	4:13
3.	"Berimbau/Consolação" (featuring Stevie Wonder and Gracinha Leporace)	4:22
4.	"The Frog" (featuring Q-Tip and will.i.am)	3:50
5.	"Let Me" (featuring Jill Scott and will.i.am)	4:14
6.	"Bananeira (Banana Tree)" (featuring Mr. Vegas)	3:14
7.	"Surfboard" (featuring will.i.am)	4:31
8.	"Please Baby Don't" (featuring John Legend)	4:09
9.	"Samba da Benção (Samba of The Blessing)" (featuring Marcelo D2)	4:14
10.	"Timeless" (featuring india.arie)	3:54
11.	"Loose Ends" (featuring Justin Timberlake, Pharoahe Monch and will.i.am)	5:32
12.	"Fo'-Hop (Por Trás de Brás de Pina)" (Guinga and Marcelo D2)	4:14
13.	"Lamento (No Morro)" (featuring Maogani Quartet)	4:14
14.	"Ei Menina (Hey Girl)" (featuring will.i.am)	3:31
15.	"Yes, Yes Y'All" (featuring Black Thought, Chali 2na, Debi Nova and will.i.am)	5:09

== Personnel ==
- Composer - Alan Bergman
- Photography - Albert Watson
- Composer - Antonio Carlos Jobim
- Composer - Badan Powell
- Composer - Ben Tucker
- Mastering - Bernie Grundman
- Fender Rhodes - Bill Brendle
- Guest Artist, Primary Artist - Black Eyed Peas
- Primary Artist - Black Thought
- Composer - Bob Dorough
- Group Member - Carlos "Pipo" Chaves
- Primary Artist, Rap - Chali 2na
- Assistant Engineer, Engineer - Chandler Bridges
- Composer - Charles Stewart
- Assistant Engineer - Chris Young
- Congas - Chuck Prada
- Producer - Dave Amason
- Primary Artist, Vocals - Debi Nova
- Assistant Engineer - Doug Tyo
- Guest Artist, Primary Artist, Vocals - Erykah Badu
- Mixing - Ethan Willoughby
- Drums - Gary "Sugar Foot" Greenberg
- Composer - Gilberto Gil
- Photography, Primary Artist, Vocals - Gracinha Leporace
- Composer, Primary Artist - Guinga
- Composer, Primary Artist - Gutemberg Guarabyra
- Composer - Henry Mancini
- Guest Artist, Primary Artist, Vocals - India.Arie
- Drum Programming, Engineer - Jason Villaroman
- Guest Artist, Primary Artist, Vocals - Jill Scott
- Executive Producer - John Burk
- Composer, Guest Artist, Primary Artist, Vocals - John Legend
- Composer - Jorge Ben
- Composer - Joao Donato
- Composer, Guest Artist, Primary Artist, Vocals - Justin Timberlake
- Fills, Ride Cymbal - Keith Harris
- Cavaquinho, Acoustic Guitar, Vocals - Kleber Jorge
- Bass - Leonardo Nobre
- Acoustic Guitar - Maogani Quartet
- Rap - Marcelo D2
- Group Member - Marcos Alves
- Group Member, Guitar Arrangements - Marcus Tardelli
- Composer - Marilyn Bergman
- Percussion - Meia Noite
- Assistant Engineer - Mike Houge
- Bass, Drums, Snare Drums, Percussion - Mike Shapiro
- Electric Guitar - Mitchell Long
- Guest Artist, Primary Artist, Vocals - Mr. Vegas
- Engineer - Nicolas Duport
- Composer - Norman Gimbel
- Engineer - Padraic Kerin
- Engineer - Paul Erickson
- Guitar - Paul Meyers
- Drums - Paulinho Braga
- Group Member - Paulo Aragao
- Bass, Orchestral Arrangements, Performer - Peter Wolf
- Primary Artist, Rap - Pharoahe Monch
- Composer - Printz Board
- Guest Artist, Primary Artist, Rap - Q-Tip
- Package Design, Visual Concept - Roland Young
- Bass - Sergio Brandao
- Arranger, Composer, Fender Rhodes, Linear Notes, Piano, Primary Artist, Producer, Synthesizer, Synthesizer Strings, Vocals, Wurlitzer - Sergio Mendes
- Production Coordination - Stephanie Cooper Willoughby
- Saxophone - Steve Tavaglione
- Guest Artist, Harmonica, Primary Artist - Stevie Wonder
- Composer - Tariq Trotter
- Flute, Saxophone - Tim Izo
- Mixing - Tony Maserati
- Composer - Vinicius De Moraes
- Arranger, Bass, Drum Programming, Linear Notes, Percussion, Piano, Primary Artist, Producer, Rap, Sampling, Vocals - will.i.am
- Composer - William Adams
- Mixing Assistant - Zach Hancock

== Charts ==
=== Weekly charts ===
Chart (2006)	Peak position
Austrian Albums (Ö3 Austria)	21
Belgian Albums (Ultratop Flanders)	17
Belgian Albums (Ultratop Wallonia)	59
Dutch Albums (Album Top 100)	5
French Albums (SNEP)	31
German Albums (Offizielle Top 100)	51
Italian Albums (FIMI)	21
Scottish Albums (Official Charts)	51
Swiss Albums (Schweizer Hitparade)	31
UK Albums (Official Charts)	15
US Billboard 200	44

=== Year-end charts ===
Chart (2006)	Position
Dutch Albums (Album Top 100)	70
UK Albums (OCC)	199

== Certifications ==
Region	Certification	Certified units/sales
Brazil (Pro-Música Brasil)	Platinum	60,000^{‡}
United Kingdom (BPI)	Gold	100,000^{^}
^{^} Shipments figures based on certification alone.^{‡} Sales+streaming figures based on certification alone.
