= Herb Alpert Presents Sergio Mendes & Brasil '66 =

Herb Alpert Presents Sérgio Mendes and Brasil '66

Studio album by Sérgio Mendes
- Released: August 1966
- Genre: Bossa nova
- Length: 25:47
- Label: A&M; SP-4116
- Producer: Herb Alpert, Jerry Moss

Sérgio Mendes chronology
The Great Arrival (1965)	Herb Alpert Presents Sérgio Mendes and Brasil '66 (1966)	Equinox (1967)

Herb Alpert Presents Sergio Mendes & Brasil '66 is the first album by Sérgio Mendes and Brasil '66. It was inducted into the Grammy Hall of Fame in 2011.

== Track listing ==
No.	Title	Writer(s)	Length
1.	"Mas Que Nada"	Jorge Ben	2:38
2.	"One Note Samba / Spanish Flea"	Antônio Carlos Jobim, Julius Wechter, Newton Mendonça	1:46
3.	"The Joker"	Anthony Newley, Leslie Bricusse	2:39
4.	"Goin' Out Of My Head"	Robert Weinstein, Teddy Randazzo	3:04
5.	"Tim Dom Dom"	Clodoaldo Brito, João Mello	1:54
6.	"Day Tripper"	John Lennon, Paul McCartney	3:04
7.	"Água de Beber"	Antônio Carlos Jobim, Vinícius de Moraes, Norman Gimbel	2:29
8.	"Slow Hot Wind"	Henry Mancini, Norman Gimbel	2:31
9.	"O Pato"	Jayme Da Sylva, Neuza Teixeira	1:57
10.	"Berimbau"	Vinícius de Moraes, Ray Gilbert, Baden Powell	3:16
Total length:			25:21

== Reception ==
Professional ratings
Review scores
Source	Rating
AllMusic	4.5/5 stars

"Mas Que Nada", the album's opening track, particularly reached international success, representing bossa nova around the world. In 2014, Mendes said: "It was the first time that a song in Portuguese was a hit in America and all over the world."

== Personnel ==
- Sérgio Mendes – piano, backing vocals, keyboards, arrangements
- Lani Hall – lead vocals
- Bibi Vogel – backing vocals
- Bob Matthews – bass, backing vocals
- José Soares – percussion, backing vocals
- João Palma – drums

== Charts ==
Chart (1966)	Peak position
US Billboard 200	7
US Top Jazz Albums (Billboard)	2

== Certifications ==
Region	Certification	Certified units/sales
United States (RIAA)	Gold	500,000^{^}
^{^} Shipments figures based on certification alone.
