= Kevyn Lettau =

Brazilian singer (born 1959)

Kevyn Lettau (born 1959 in West Berlin, West Germany) is a singer.

She scored success in the United States in the early 1990s with her albums Kevyn Lettau (U.S. Top Contemporary Jazz Albums peak No. 16) and Simple Life (Top Contemporary Jazz peak No. 6).

She is the daughter of the German-American writer Reinhard Lettau.

== Discography ==
- Brasiljazz (JVC, 1991)
- Kevyn Lettau (JVC, 1991)
- Simple Life (JVC, 1992)
- Another Season (JVC, 1994)
- Universal Language (JVC, 1995)
- The Language of Flowers (Victor, 1998)
- Walking in Your Footsteps – Songs of the Police (Universal, 2000)
- Little Things (Verve, 2001)
- The Color of Love (Cats and Dogs Music, 2003)
- Bye Bye Blackbird (MCG Jazz, 2005)
- Kevyn Lettau and Friends in Concert (Kevyn Lettau, 2007)
- What Is Enough? with Peter Sprague (SBE, 2008)
- Drawn to You (Kevyn Lettau, 2011)
