= Mas que nada =

1963 song by Jorge Ben

Single by Jorge Ben

from the album Samba Esquema Novo
- Language: Portuguese
- Released: 10 January 1963
- Recorded: 1963
- Genre: Samba; samba rock; bossa nova
- Length: 2:59
- Label: Philips
- Songwriter: Jorge Ben
- Producer: Armando Pittigliani

"Mas que nada" (Brazilian Portuguese pronunciation: [ma(j)s ki ˈnadɐ]) is a Brazilian song written by Jorge Ben (later known as Jorge Ben Jor) and originally recorded in 1962 by Carioca Bossa Nova musician & bandleader Zé Maria on the album Tudo Azul - Bossa E Balanço, with Jorge Ben singing lead vocals across the album. Jorge Ben recorded his own version the following year on his debut album Samba Esquema Novo, which was also released as a single. The song was covered first by several other prominent Brazilian artists in the following years, including by Tamba Trio in 1963 and Luis Carlos Vinhas in 1964. It was voted by the Brazilian edition of Rolling Stone as the fifth-greatest Brazilian song. It was inducted to the Latin Grammy Hall of Fame in 2013.

== José Prates song ==
In 1958, Brazilian artist José Prates recorded a track called "Nanã Imborô" that appears on his album Tam... Tam... Tam...! (1958, Polydor Brasil – LPNG 4.016), which features the underlying melody and vocalizations later used by Jorge Ben in "Mas que nada"; these motifs would be further highlighted by Sergio Mendes’ arrangement in his version of the song in 1966.

== Sérgio Mendes versions ==
Sérgio Mendes covered the song with his band Brasil '66 on their debut album, Herb Alpert Presents Sergio Mendes & Brasil '66 (1966). In the United States, the single reached number 47 on the US Billboard Hot 100, and number four on the Billboard Easy Listening chart. In Canada it reached number 54. Outside of Brazil this 1966 version is better known than Jorge Ben's original and, to many, the definitive version of the song. In 1989, Mendes re-recorded the song on his album Arara.

=== 1998 Nike commercial and resurgence ===
In 1998, Tamba Trio's 1963 recording of "Mas que nada" was featured as the soundtrack for Nike's prominent "Airport '98" television commercial, broadcast ahead of the 1998 FIFA World Cup. The success of the commercial prompted the group to re-release the song as a single. Despite the two versions having quite different arrangements (Tamba Trio's features a prominent saxophone solo), the track is often mistaken for Sérgio Mendes's version from 1966. Directed by Hollywood action filmmaker John Woo, the multimillion-dollar ambush marketing campaign depicted members of the Brazil national football team—including star players Ronaldo, Romário, and Roberto Carlos—choreographing a spontaneous, high-energy game of football through a sterile airport terminal to escape boredom. The track's rhythmic bossa nova and samba elements perfectly captured the soulful, creative spirit of the advertisement. The commercial was widely acclaimed as one of the greatest and most influential sports advertisements of all time, reintroducing the song to a massive new generation of international viewers and firmly cementing the track as a global audio anthem for Brazilian football. This renewed cultural spotlight ultimately paved the way for Mendes to re-record the song in 2006 with the American hip-hop group The Black Eyed Peas.

=== With the Black Eyed Peas ===
"Mas que nada"

Single by Sérgio Mendes featuring the Black Eyed Peas

from the album Timeless
- Released: 19 June 2006
- Length: 3:32 (single version); 4:22 (album version)
- Label: Concord; Hear; will.i.am
- Songwriter: Jorge Ben Jor
- Producer: will.i.am

Sérgio Mendes singles chronology
"All My Loving" (2006)	"Mas que nada" (2006)	"Day Tripper" (2006)

The Black Eyed Peas singles chronology
"Pump It" (2006)	"Mas que nada" (2006)	"Boom Boom Pow" (2009)

In 2006, Mendes again re-recorded the song, this time with American musical group the Black Eyed Peas and additional vocals by Mendes's wife, Gracinha Leporace, for his album Timeless. This version contains a sample of the Black Eyed Peas' 2004 single "Hey Mama". The song topped the charts of Hungary and the Netherlands and peaked at number six on the UK Singles Chart. This version was included in the 2011 animated film Rio (along with another version recorded in the style of Brasil '66 and also coincidentally featuring one of the Peas' members, will.i.am, with a voice role in the film as Pedro the red-crested cardinal, one of the main characters of the film) and its soundtrack.

==== Track listings ====
US 12-inch single

A1. "Mas que nada" (The Masters at Work remix) – 8:03
B1. "Mas que nada" (radio edit featuring the Black Eyed Peas) – 3:32
B2. "Mais que nada" (original Sérgio Mendes & Brasil '66 version) – 2:41

European CD single

1. "Mas que nada" (radio edit featuring the Black Eyed Peas) – 3:32
2. "Mais que nada" (original Sérgio Mendes & Brasil '66 version) – 2:41

European 12-inch single

A1. "Mas que nada" (Masters at Work remix) – 8:03
B1. "Mas que nada" (Full Phat remix) – 4:27
B2. "Mas que nada" (Masters at Work dub remix) – 5:20

German maxi-CD single

1. "Mas que nada" (radio edit featuring the Black Eyed Peas) – 3:32
2. "Mas que nada" (The Masters at Work remix) – 8:03
3. "Mais que nada" (original Sérgio Mendes & Brasil '66 version) – 2:41

==== Charts ====
Weekly chart performance
Chart (2006–2007)	Peak position
Austria (Ö3 Austria Top 40)	8
Belgium (Ultratop 50 Flanders)	7
Belgium (Ultratop 50 Wallonia)	12
Belgium Dance (Ultratop Flanders)	18
CIS Airplay (TopHit)	17
Croatia (HRT)	3
Czech Republic Airplay (ČNS IFPI)	6
Europe (Eurochart Hot 100)	7
France (SNEP)	40
Germany (GfK)	9
Greece (IFPI)	19
Hungary (Dance Top 40)	2
Hungary (Rádiós Top 40)	1
Ireland (IRMA)	14
Netherlands (Dutch Top 40)	1
Netherlands (Single Top 100)	2
Russia Airplay (TopHit)	17
Scottish Singles Sales (Official Charts)	6
Slovakia Airplay (ČNS IFPI)	12
Switzerland (Schweizer Hitparade)	4
UK Singles (Official Charts)	6
UK Hip Hop/R&B (Official Charts)	2
Ukraine Airplay (TopHit)	82
US Dance Club Play (Billboard)	13

Year-end chart performance
Chart (2006)	Position
Austria (Ö3 Austria Top 40)	45
Belgium (Ultratop 50 Flanders)	23
Belgium (Ultratop 50 Wallonia)	54
CIS Airplay (TopHit)	128
Europe (Eurochart Hot 100)	89
Germany (Media Control GfK)	57
Hungary (Dance Top 40)	31
Hungary (Rádiós Top 40)	7
Netherlands (Dutch Top 40)	7
Netherlands (Single Top 100)	10
Russia Airplay (TopHit)	120
Switzerland (Schweizer Hitparade)	19
UK Singles (OCC)	112

==== Certifications ====
Certifications
Region	Certification	Certified units/sales
Brazil (Pro-Música Brasil)	Gold	50,000^{*}
Germany (BVMI)	Gold	150,000^{‡}
Italy (FIMI)	Gold	50,000^{‡}
New Zealand (RMNZ)	Gold	15,000^{‡}
United Kingdom (BPI)	Silver	200,000^{‡}
^{*} Sales figures based on certification alone.^{‡} Sales+streaming figures based on certification alone.
