= The Great Arrival =

Studio album by Sérgio Mendes
- Released: 1966
- Genre: Bossa nova
- Label: Atlantic
- Producer: Nesuhi Ertegun

Sérgio Mendes chronology
Brasil '65 (1965)	The Great Arrival (1966)	Herb Alpert Presents Sergio Mendes & Brasil '66 (1966)

The Great Arrival is a 1966 instrumental album by Sérgio Mendes.

== Track listing ==
1. "The Great Arrival (Chegança)" (Edu Lobo, Oduvaldo Vianna Filho) 2:19
2. "Monday, Monday" (John Phillips) 2:32
3. "Carnaval" (Clare Fischer) 2:40
4. "Canção do Amanhecer" (Edu Lobo, Vinícius de Moraes) 2:48
5. "Here's That Rainy Day" (Jimmy Van Heusen, Johnny Burke) 2:22
6. "Borandá" (Edu Lobo) 2:41
7. "Nanã" (Moacir Santos, Mário Telles) 2:35
8. "Bonita" (Antônio Carlos Jobim) 3:24
9. "Morning" (Clare Fischer) 2:38
10. "Don't Go Breaking My Heart" (Burt Bacharach, Hal David) 2:34
11. "Tristeza de Amar" (Geraldo Vandré, Luiz Roberto) 3:18
12. "Girl Talk" (Neil Hefti, Bobby Troup) 2:24

== Personnel ==
- Clare Fischer – arranger, conductor (track 3, 6, 9 & 12)
- Bob Florence – arranger, conductor (track 1, 2, 7 & 10)
- Richard Hazard – arranger, conductor (track 4, 5, 8 & 11)
- John Norman – recording engineer
- Marvin Israel – album design
- Otto Stupakoff – cover photo
