= Karen Philipp =

American singer and actress (born 1945)

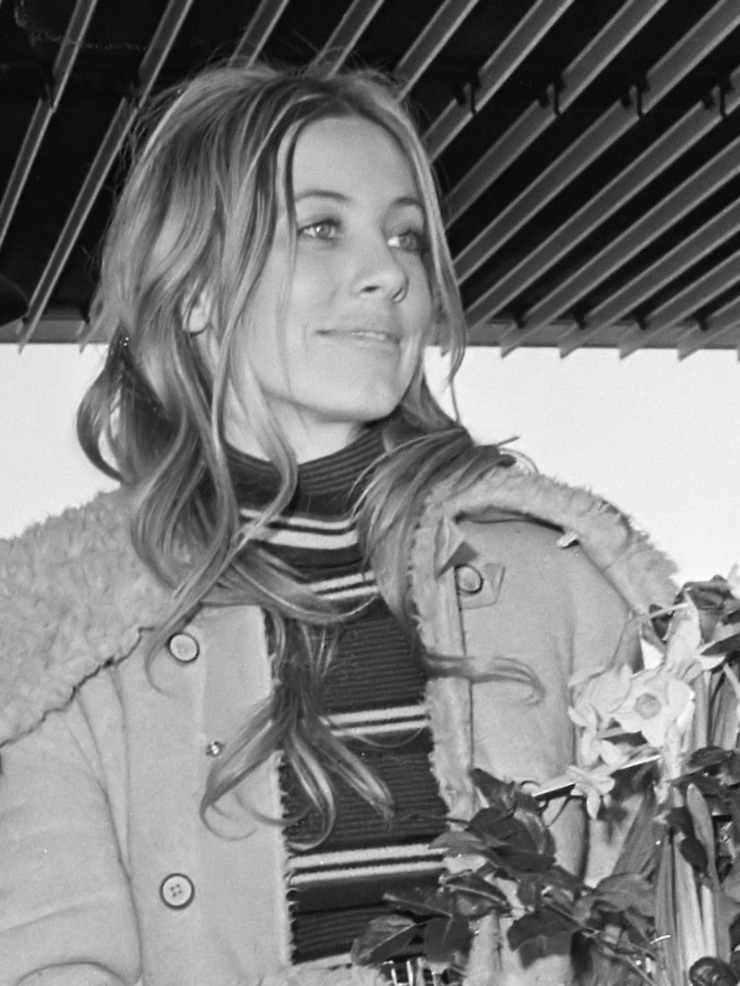
- Karen Philipp in 1971
- Born: September 7, 1945 (age 81); Salina, Kansas, U.S.
- Occupations: Television actress singer
- Years active: 1963–1985
- Spouse: Pat Proft
- Children: 1 (son)

Karen Philipp (born September 7, 1945) is a retired American singer and actress.

== Career ==
Philipp came to national prominence in 1968 when she was hired as one of the two female vocalists in the second iteration of Sérgio Mendes and Brasil '66, debuting on their Top Ten best-selling album, Fool on the Hill. She remained with Brasil '66 (and its successor group, Brasil '77) until she left in 1972 to pursue an acting career.

She portrayed Lt. Dish in the first season of M*A*S*H. Though her role was written out of the series after two episodes, a shot of her was used in the opening credits for the remainder of the series. She later had a recurring role on Quincy, M.E. as Robin Rollin (seasons 3-6).

Philipp also posed nude in a pictorial in the September 1972 issue of Playboy, promoting her role in M*A*S*H.

== Personal life ==
Philipp married movie producer Pat Proft and they have a son. They reside in Medina, Minnesota.

== Filmography ==
=== Film ===
Year	Title	Role	Notes
1980	A Change of Seasons	Young Girl #2	
1985	Moving Violations	Secretary	

=== Television ===
Year	Title	Role	Notes
1972	M*A*S*H	Lt. Dish	2 episodes
1973	A Brand New Life	Sarah White	Television film
1973	Emergency!	1st Nurse / Nurse	2 episodes
1974	Evel Knievel	Tracy Butler	Television film
1974	Police Story	May	Episode: "Requiem for C.Z. Smith"
1975	Cannon	Sandra	Episode: "The Star"
1975	Bronk	Donna	Episode: "There's Gonna Be a War"
1976	The Streets of San Francisco	Valarie	Episode: "Superstar"
1976	Serpico	Bambi	Episode: "Danger Zone"
1978–1981	Quincy, M.E.	Robin	13 episodes
1979	B. J. and the Bear	Emily Bartlett	Episode: "Gasohol"
1981	Advice to the Lovelorn	Marie Moore	Television film
