= Gracinha Leporace =

Brazilian singer (born 1950)

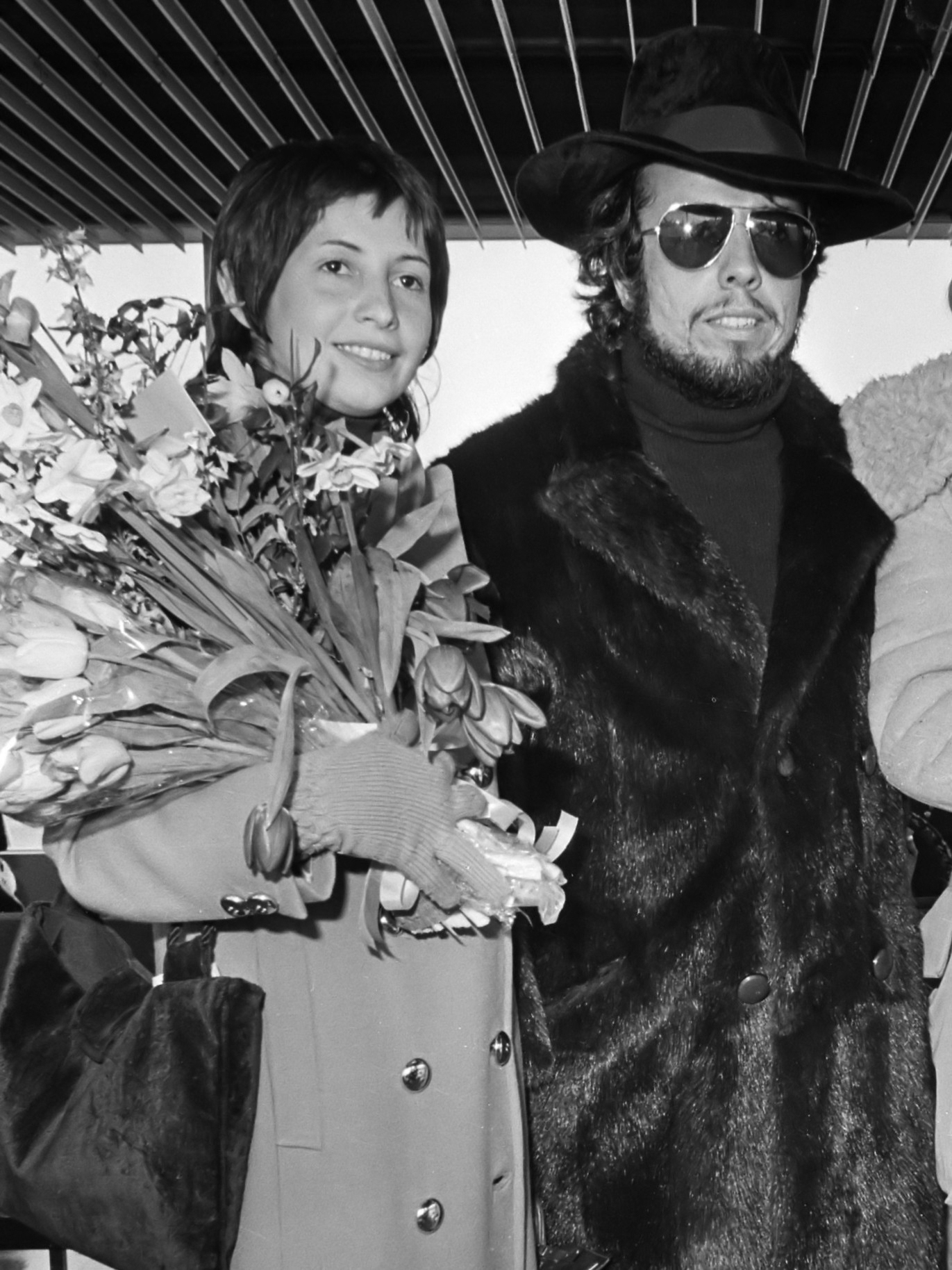
- Leporace with Sérgio Mendes, 1971

Background information
- Born: Maria da Graça Leporace; 20 January 1950 (age 76); Ipanema, Rio de Janeiro, Brazil
- Origin: Rio de Janeiro, Brazil
- Genres: Bossa nova; Latin; Latin jazz; jazz; disco; adult contemporary
- Occupation: Singer
- Instrument: Vocals
- Spouse: Sérgio Mendes (died 2024)

Gracinha Leporace (born Maria da Graça Leporace; 20 January 1950) is a Brazilian singer who worked extensively with her late husband Sérgio Mendes and his band.

Leporace was born in Ipanema, Rio de Janeiro. She has a sister, Marianna Leporace, who is a singer and actress in Brazil. She founded "Grupo Manifesto" in 1965, Brazilian band active until 1968.

Leporace has featured regularly in much of her husband's group's releases since the 1970s and can be heard as the Portuguese-singing female vocal in the hit "Mas que nada" (featuring the Black Eyed Peas) from the 2006 album Timeless and in the Baden Powell de Aquino composition "Berimbau/Consolação" from the same album, in which she provides the lead vocal. She has been featured on Sergio Mendes's album Magic, released in 2014. She also appears frequently in concert with Mendes's band as a vocalist.

Along with her work with Mendes, she was a member of the Bossa Nova group Bossa Rio in the early 1970s.

Leporace has two sons with Mendes: Gustavo and Tiago. She has lived in Los Angeles, California, for many years.

== Discography ==
- 1968 Gracinha Leporace, Philips
