= The Begatting of the President =

Studio album by Orson Welles
- Released: August 1, 1970
- Recorded: 1970
- Genres: Spoken word; Political satire; Parody
- Length: 32:37
- Label: Mediarts Records (US)
- Producers: Ben Brady; Alan W. Livingston

The Begatting of the President is a satirical album narrated by Orson Welles, summarising the presidency of Lyndon B. Johnson and the election of 1968, leading up to the election of Richard Nixon, delivered in the style of Biblical verse.

== Production ==
The album's script was written by Myron Roberts, Lincoln Haynes and Sasha Gilien, and was simultaneously published by Ballantine Books. The album was produced by Mediarts Records, a small record label co-founded by former Capitol Records executive Alan W. Livingston, and was Mediarts' second release, after Dory Previn's On My Way to Where.

Orson Welles was selected as the deadpan narrator due to his already being an established narrator, including on Biblical epics such as King of Kings (1961). Luchi de Jesus provided the album's incidental music.

== Track listing ==
=== Side 1 ===
1. L. B. Jenesis (2:13)
2. The Defoliation of Eden (3:54)
3. Burn, Pharaoh, Burn (3:45)
4. The Coming of Richard (3:24)

=== Side 2 ===
5. The Pacification of Goliath (3:06)
6. Paradise Bossed (3:04)
7. The Raising of Richard (2:08)
8. The Book of Hubert (2:35)
9. The Ascension (3:00)

== Releases ==
The album was released by Mediarts (41–2) on August 1, 1970, as both an LP record, and an 8-track tape.

The album was subsequently reissued in 1972, by United Artists Records (UAS-5521), who had purchased Mediarts by that time.

== Aftermath ==
The album received a nomination for Best Comedy Recording in the 13th Annual Grammy Awards.

In the aftermath of the album's release, in 1971 Welles found himself on the receiving end of a tax audit from the Nixon administration, which forced him to put several projects on hold (most notably his The Other Side of the Wind), in favour of more lucrative work to pay off his tax debt. It has been suggested by several Welles biographers that the tax audit was prompted by the Nixon administration in retaliation for The Begatting of the President. This claim is difficult to verify, though – on the one hand, the Nixon administration did indeed keep an "enemies list", of left-wingers in the media and politics. On the other hand, Welles did not appear on any known version of the list, he had long maintained a highly unorthodox series of tax arrangements, and a 1973 report by the Congressional Joint Committee on Internal Revenue Taxation concluded that people on the "Enemies" list had not been subjected to an unusual number of tax audits.
