= Cross My Heart =

Cross My Heart may refer to:

- Sign of the cross, a Christian ritual blessing that gave rise to the oath "cross my heart and hope to die"

== Film ==
- Cross My Heart (1937 film), a British drama directed by Bernard Mainwaring
- Cross My Heart (1946 film), an American comedy directed by John Berry
- Cross My Heart (1987 film), an American romantic comedy directed by Armyan Bernstein
- Cross My Heart, a 2002 short film by Avie Luthra
- Cross My Heart (2017 film), a Canadian drama directed by Luc Picard

== Music ==
=== Albums ===
- Cross My Heart: An Introduction to Phil Ochs or the title song (see below), 2004
- Cross My Heart, an EP by Matthew Davidson, 2014

=== Songs ===
- "Cross My Heart" (Eighth Wonder song), 1988
- "Cross My Heart" (Marianas Trench song), 2008
- "Cross My Heart" (Phil Ochs song), 1967
- "Cross My Heart" (Skepta song), 2010
- "Cross My Heart", by A-Teens from Pop 'til You Drop!
- "Cross My Heart", by Awaken the Empire
- "Cross My Heart", by Billy Stewart
- "Cross My Heart", by Brotherhood of Man from Oh Boy!
- "Cross My Heart", by Bruce Springsteen from Human Touch
- "Cross My Heart", by Carcass from Swansong
- "Cross My Heart", by Diana Ross from Red Hot Rhythm & Blues
- "Cross My Heart", by Edyta from Invisible
- "Cross My Heart", by Esham from Boomin' Words from Hell
- "Cross My Heart", by Everything but the Girl from Baby, the Stars Shine Bright
- "Cross My Heart", by Johnny Ace
- "Cross My Heart", by Killah Priest from Heavy Mental
- "Cross My Heart", by Melody's Echo Chamber from Bon Voyage
- "Cross My Heart", by The Rocket Summer from Calendar Days
- "Cross My Heart", by S Club 7 from 7
- "Cross My Heart", by Sonny Boy Williamson from Down and Out Blues
- "Cross My Heart and Hope to Die", by Sentenced from The Cold White Light

== Other uses ==
- Cross My Heart (novel), a 2013 Alex Cross novel by James Patterson
- "Cross My Heart" (Doctors), a television episode
- "Cross My Heart" (It's All Relative), a television episode

== See also ==
- "I Cross My Heart", a song by George Strait
- "I Cross My Heart", a song by All-4-One from On and On
- X My Heart (disambiguation)
