= Joby Baker =

Canadian actor and painter (1934–2026)

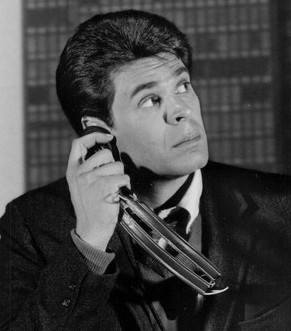
- Baker on Good Morning World in 1967
- Born: March 26, 1934; Montreal, Quebec, Canada
- Died: June 22, 2026 (aged 92); Yonkers, New York, U.S.
- Occupations: Actor, painter
- Years active: 1952–1984; 2024
- Spouses: Joan Blackman (m. 1959; div. 1961) Joyce H. Winter (m. 1961; div. 1975) Dory Previn (m. 1984; died 2012) Megan Moore (m. 2014)
- Children: 5

Joseph N. "Joby" Baker (March 26, 1934 – June 22, 2026) was a Canadian-born American actor and painter. As an actor, he was best known for his lighthearted, low-key comedy roles, including the lead role in the short-lived sitcom Good Morning World.

== Early life ==
Baker was born in Montreal, Quebec, on March 26, 1934. He relocated to the then-territory of Hawaii with his father when his mother died shortly after he was born. His sobriquet Joby is a shortening of "Jobela," the nickname his father bestowed upon him in childhood. On December 7, 1941, during the bombing of Pearl Harbor, the house he lived in was hit by friendly fire in the immediate aftermath. Baker lived most of his childhood in Oahu, Hawaii then moved to New York City to attend school. While in the U.S. Army, he entertained troops.

== Career ==
An early role in Baker's career was in a 1958 episode of The George Burns and Gracie Allen Show, "Ronnie Makes A Record", where he was cast as a recording studio vocalist. In the early 1960s, he made guest appearances on many television series. In 1962, he appeared on Perry Mason as Kenneth Carter in "The Case of the Bogus Books". He appeared as a semi-regular in the first season of the WWII TV series Combat! as Pvt. Kelly.

Other television series appearances included The Alfred Hitchcock Hour, Dr. Kildare and The Dick Van Dyke Show. In 1967, a year after The Dick Van Dyke Show ended, Baker was chosen by CBS to be Van Dyke's successor in what was originally pitched as The Joby Baker Show; Baker strongly objected to the title since he did not want his name attached to a show that could have been a career-defining flop. The series eventually was named Good Morning World; it followed a similar premise to Van Dyke's show, except centered around a radio show instead of television. Good Morning World ended after a single season in 1968. In 1960, he co-starred with Jack Lemmon and Ricky Nelson in The Wackiest Ship in the Army. He appeared in the Elvis Presley movie Girl Happy (1965), When the Boys Meet the Girls (1965), and in all three Gidget movies.

In 1967, Baker was cast as a travelling magician, Dr. William Davis, in the episode "The Saga of Dr. Davis" on the syndicated series Death Valley Days, hosted by Robert Taylor. Judi Meredith played his wife, Jenny, whose death leads him to take an adopted son, Tad, on his remaining westward journeys. Baker began a long association with Walt Disney Studios where he appeared in The Adventures of Bullwhip Griffin (1967), Blackbeard's Ghost (1968), and Superdad (1974). This was followed by a succession of character roles, including an appearance in an episode of the 1973 situation comedy A Touch of Grace and a stint as "Colonel Marvin" on the 1980 sitcom The Six O'Clock Follies. Baker was in Avalanche (1978).

Baker largely left acting after marrying Dory Previn in 1984; he felt that he did not have the temperament or personality to be a full-time actor.

== Personal life and death ==
Baker first married Joan Blackman, whom he met in drama school in 1959 and divorced in 1961. He married Joyce Harriet Winter in 1961 and divorced in 1975. In 1984, Baker married lyricist and songwriter Dory Previn. He illustrated The Dory Previn Songbook, published in 1995.

Baker, in 1984, stopped acting and established himself as a painter, sculptor and jewelry artisan. He and Previn moved to Southfield, Massachusetts. Baker was inspired by his wife, Previn. Previn died in 2012. He married Megan Moore in 2014.

Baker died at a hospital in Yonkers, New York, on June 22, 2026, at the age of 92, ten days after his co-star Ronnie Schell from Good Morning World died, at the age of 94.

== Filmography ==
=== Film ===
Year	Title	Role	Director(s)	Notes
1955	Target Zero	Private	Harmon Jones	War film Uncredited
1959	The Last Angry Man	Myron Malkin	Daniel Mann	Drama film
1959	Gidget	Stinky	Paul Wendkos	Comedy film
1960	Key Witness	Muggles	Phil Karlson	Neo-noir crime film
1960	The Wackiest Ship in the Army	Josh Davidson	Richard Murphy	War comedy-drama film
1961	Gidget Goes Hawaiian	Judge Hamilton	Paul Wendkos	Romantic comedy musical film
1962	Hootenanny Hoot	Steve Laughlin	Gene Nelson	Musical film
1963	Gidget Goes to Rome	Judge	Paul Wendkos	Romantic comedy film
1964	Looking for Love	Cuz Rickover	Don Weis	Romantic musical-comedy film
1965	Girl Happy	Wilbur	Boris Sagal	Romantic musical-comedy film
1965	When the Boys Meet the Girls	Sam	Alvin Ganzer	Musical film
1967	The Adventures of Bullwhip Griffin	Bandido Leader	James Neilson	Western comedy film
1968	Blackbeard's Ghost	Silky Seymour	Robert Stevenson	Fantasy comedy film
1973	Self-Portrait	Allan	Maurice McEndree	Drama film
1973	Superdad	Klutch	Vincent McEveety	Comedy film
1978	Avalanche	TV Director	Corey Allen	Disaster film
2024	Dory Previn: On My Way to Where	Self	Dianna Dilworth; Julia Greenberg	Documentary film

=== Television ===
Year	Title	Role	Notes
1952	The Red Skelton Hour	Junior	2 episodes
1957	Studio One	Trial spectator	Episode: "The Defender, part 1"
1957	The West Point Story	Cadet Monty Berrin	Episode: "Dangerous Area"
1957	Bachelor Father	Boy at Stage Door	Episode: "Uncle Bentley Keeps His Promise"
1957-59	Dragnet	Guest star Guest star Bob Tepps	Episodes: "The Big Truck"; "The Big Boot"; "The Big Counterfeit"
1958	The George Burns and Gracie Allen Show	Quartet Member	Episode: "Ronnie Makes a Record"
1958	The George Burns Show	Self	Episode: "George and the Private Eye"
1958-62	Alfred Hitchcock Presents	Thor; Jimmy Dolan; Vernon	Episodes: "Six People, No Music"; "Madame Mystery"; "The Right Kind of Medicine"
1960	Surfside 6	Bernie Bergen	Episode: "Power of Suggestion"
1961	The Adventures of Ozzie and Harriet	Joby	Episode: "The Fraternity Rents Out a Room"
1961	Cain's Hundred	Larry Delby	Episode: "King of the Mountain"
1961	Dr. Kildare	Jerry House	Episode: "A Million Dollar Property"
1961	The Roaring 20's	Joby Price	Episode: "Pinky Goes to College"
1961	Wagon Train	Nathan May	Episode: "The Bettina May Story"
1961-62	Bachelor Father	Biff Merideth	Episodes: "A Man Among Men"; "How Howard Won His 'C'"
1962	Frontier Circus	George Washington Jukes	Episode: "Mighty Like Rogues"
1962	Gunsmoke	Ky	Episode: "Call Me Dodie"
1962	Perry Mason	Kenneth Carter	Episode: "The Case of the Bogus Books"
1962	Sam Benedict	Nick Correa	Episode: "Everybody's Playing Polo"
1962-63	Combat!	Kelly	Episodes: "Lost Sheep, Lost Shepherd"; "The Celebrity"; "Survival"
1963	The Greatest Show on Earth	Rick Andover	Episode: "The Loser"
1963	The Alfred Hitchcock Hour	Doc Carroll	Episode: "The Cadaver"
1964	Ben Casey	Harry Martin	Episode: "The Evidence of Things Not Seen"
1964	12 O'Clock High	Lieutenant Blake	Episode: "Golden Boy Had Nine Black Sheep" (Pilot)
1965	American Bandstand	Self	Episode: "Episode #8.27"
1965	The Loner	Billy Ford	Episode: "The Oath"
1965-66	The Dick Van Dyke Show	Manuel Rodriguez; Fred Staggs	Episodes: "Viva Petrie"; "Love Thy Other Neighbor"
1966	F Troop	Mario Maracucci	Episode: "La Dolce Courage"
1967	Death Valley Days	Dr. William Davis	Episode: "The Saga of Dr. Davis"
1967	Valley of Mystery	Pete Patton	Made-for-TV movie directed by Joseph Lejtes
1967-68	Good Morning World	David Lewis	Lead role
1968	Rowan & Martin's Laugh-In	Self	Episode: "Sally Field, Terry-Thomas, Joby Baker, Godfrey Cambridge, Jerry Lewis, John Wayne"
1969	Mannix	Rudy Marin	Episode: "The Sound of Darkness"
1971	Love, American Style	Ted	Segment: "Love and the Vacation" (S 3:Ep 8)
1972	The Streets of San Francisco	Jamie Lane	Episode: "The First Day of Forever"
1972	Assignment Vienna	Russell	Episode: "Queen's Gambit"
1973	A Touch of Grace	Dickson	Episode: "The Commercial"
1973	Cry Rape	Jerry Cohen	Made-for-TV movie directed by Corey Allen
1974	Run, Joe, Run	Missionary 2	Episode: "Missionary"
1974	Barnaby Jones	Joe Holland	Episode: "Blueprint for a Caper"
1974-75	Police Story	Macon; Harold	Episodes: "The Hunters"; "The Man in the Shadows"
1975	Kate McShane	Guest	Episode: "Publish or Perish"
1975	Medical Center	Tony Tabor	Episode: "The Silent Witness"
1976	Bronk	Sgt. Ben Waite	Episode: "The Deadlier Sex"
1976	Gemini Man	Josef	Episode: "Suspect Your Local Police"
1977	The City	Mel Greenwall	Made-for-TV movie directed by Harvey Hart
1977	Most Wanted	Pete Kerman	Episode: "The People Mover"
1977-82	Quincy, M.E.	Various	4 episodes
1979	Stone	Murray Weinstock	3 episodes
1979	Sex and the Single Parent	Millard	Made-for-TV movie directed by Jackie Cooper
1980	Jimmy B. & André	Judge Tom Lucci	Made-for-TV movie directed by Guy Green
1980	Nobody's Perfect	Dixie	Episode: "What's on Third?"
1980	The Six O'Clock Follies	Col. Harvey Mann	6 episodes
1981	Simon & Simon	Parker Stans	Episode: "Details at Eleven" (Pilot)
1982	McClain's Law	Dr. Lester	Episode: "The Last Hero"
1983	Tucker's Witch	Mickey Daugherty	Episode: "Rock Is a Hard Place"
1984	The Paper Chase	Police Detective	Episode: "Burden of Proof"
