= Reflections in a Mud Puddle =

Studio album by Dory Previn
- Released: December 1971
- Genre: Singer-songwriter
- Label: United Artists
- Producer: Nik Venet

Dory Previn chronology
Mythical Kings and Iguanas (1971)	Reflections in a Mud Puddle (1971)	Mary C. Brown and the Hollywood Sign (1972)

Professional ratings
Review scores
Source	Rating
Allmusic	2/5 stars

Reflections in a Mud Puddle was the third solo LP by Dory Previn, released in late 1971. The second side of the original LP was entitled Taps Tremors And Time Steps (One Last Dance for My Father), and was a continuous suite of songs reflecting on her childhood experiences with a mentally ill father and its impact on her adult relationships.

== Track listing ==
Words and music by Dory Previn, fish horns arranged by Dan Morehouse, and strings and horns arranged by Perry Botkin, Jr.

Reflections in a Mud Puddle

1. "Doppelganger"
2. "The New Enzyme Detergent Demise of Ali MacGraw"
3. "The Talkative Woman and the Two Star General"
4. "The Altruist and the Needy Case"
5. "Play It Again, Sam"

Taps Tremors and Time Steps (One Last Dance for My Father)

1. "The Earthquake in Los Angeles (February, 1971)"
2. "The Final Flight of the Hindenburg (May, 1937)"
3. "I Dance and Dance and Smile and Smile"
4. "The Air Crash in New Jersey"
5. "Aftershock"

== Personnel ==
- Guitar: Dennis Budimir, David Bennett Cohen, William Keene, Don Peake, Dory Previn, Louis Shelton, Tommy Tedesco
- Banjo: Louis Shelton
- Bass: Carol Kaye, Joe Osborn, Lyle Ritz
- Keyboards: Perry Botkin, Jr., Thomas Keene, Michael Lang
- Drums: Frank Capp, Paul Humphrey, Earl Palmer, Ron Tutt
- Saxophone: Gene Cipriano, Steve Douglas, Abe Most, Ted Nash
- Strings: Murray Adler, Israel Baker, Harry Bluestone, Joseph DiFiore, Jesse Ehrlich, James Getzoff, Armond Kaproff,
  Nathan Kaproff, Raymond Kelley, Lou Klass, William Kurasch, Gareth Nuttycombe, Nathan Rass, Sidney Sharp,
  Jack Shulman, Paul Shure, Joseph Stepansky, Gerald Vinci
- Horns: Paul Hubinon, Dick Hyde, Buck Monari, Richard Nash, Anthony Terran
- Backing Vocals: John, Tom Bahler, Stan Farber
