= Joe Osborn =

American bassist (1937–2018)

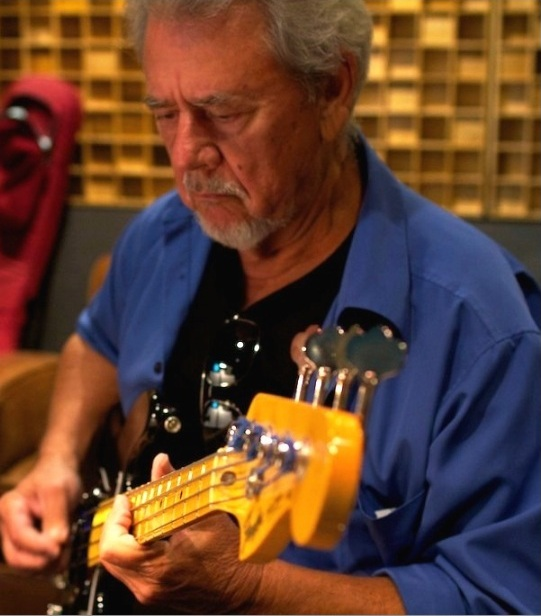
- Osborn in 2012

Background information
- Born: Joe Osborn; August 28, 1937; Mound, Louisiana, U.S.
- Died: December 14, 2018 (aged 81) Greenwood, Louisiana, U.S.
- Genres: Pop, country, rock
- Occupation: Session musician
- Instrument: Bass guitar
- Years active: 1957–2018

Joseph Osborn (August 28, 1937 – December 14, 2018) was an American bass guitar player known for his work as a session musician in Los Angeles with the Wrecking Crew and in Nashville with the A-Team of studio musicians from the 1960s through the 1980s, playing on thousands of recordings (and hundreds of hit records) to become one of the most recorded bassists of all time.

== Early life ==
Osborn was born in Mound, Madison Parish, Louisiana, and raised in Shreveport. He was one of two children born to Imogene Mayberry; his father lived in Texas. His grandmother, Viola Montalbo, played guitar, as did his three maternal uncles. They taught him to play to the point where, by age 12, he was playing weekly in church—Osborn said that that was where he "really learned to play guitar".

By the time he was nearing high school graduation, he was playing with bands in local bars. That included the band of Dale Hawkins, which Osborn joined with his friend and former schoolmate James Burton. After they recorded the Hawkins album Oh! Suzy Q in early 1957, which included the hit "Susie Q", Burton told Osborn and Hawkins' guitarist Roy Buchanan that country singer Bob Luman was looking for guitar players—Luman had secured a 12-month run at the Las Vegas Showboat Hotel. When Osborn and Buchanan arrived in Las Vegas, they found that Luman needed one guitar player and a bass player. Despite having no experience with the bass guitar, Osborn was elected to be the bass player. He recalled: "So I went and bought a Precision bass and the next night I was a bass player. No one told me I wasn't supposed to play with a pick, and I liked the sound, so I kept the pick." One day, Osborn turned up the amplifier to better hear the bass notes and someone told him he couldn't do that—that "the bass should be felt and not heard". Osborn replied "Well, I guess you're going to get both."

After a year with Luman, Buchanan and Osborn accepted a job at a bar in Calumet City, Illinois. "What a nightmare", Osborn recalled. "Eight sets a night, seven days a week, started at eight o'clock, didn't get off until four in the morning. But I was learning how to play the bass and I was getting chops. I could play anything. I had iron fingers."

== Career ==
=== Rick Nelson ===
In January 1960, Osborn returned to Louisiana. In Bossier City, he was reunited with James Burton, who had just finished playing in Ricky Nelson’s band. Nelson was starting a new band, Burton put them in touch and, two weeks later, Osborn was in Los Angeles, as a member of Nelson’s new band.

Nelson owned a house in the Hollywood Hills, which people called 'The Nelson Bungalow'. Nelson’s manager was his father, Ozzie Nelson, who paid his son’s band members a weekly retainer of $100, often to arrive at 6:00 a.m. and do nothing. In the house was a room full of demos—unsolicited singles which aspiring songwriters had sent in the hope that Rick would record them. Ozzie wanted them all returned to the people who’d sent them and paid Osborn an extra $25 a week to mail them back. Instead, Osborn listened to them. One caught his attention and he brought it to Rick—it was Jerry Fuller’s "Travelin' Man" which, when released in 1961, became the biggest song of Nelson’s career.

Two other musicians were hanging around the Nelson Bungalow—brothers Dorsey Burnette and Johnny Burnette, struggling songwriters who had resorted to sitting on the front steps of Nelson’s house until they could get a meeting with him. Their persistence paid off and Nelson recorded some of their songs. But Osborn struck up a friendship with them and they started writing songs together, many of which were recorded by Dorsey. Two Osborn/Burnett songs became major hits and continue to be recorded: “Here Comes That Feeling” became a career-making hit for Brenda Lee in 1962; "Gypsy Woman" was a hit for Nelson, among others.

With Nelson, the band members practiced at The Bungalow then went into the studio to record, then Rick would play a new single on his parents’ TV show, ‘’The Adventures of Ozzie and Harriet’’. His band had to appear on the show as well; between 1960 and 1964, Osborn appeared in 44 episodes. With Nelson, Osborn went on his one and only major tour, through the US, Australia and the Philippines. But Nelson’s popularity began to wane and, in 1964, he broke up the band.

=== Session musician ===
Osborn had known Johnny Rivers since the early 1950s; Rivers was from Baton Rouge and used to travel up to Shreveport to play with Hawkins' band. They reunited in Los Angeles and, in January 1964, Rivers was hired to play at the opening of a bar on the Sunset Strip—the Whisky a Go Go. The bar became legendary, very quickly, and Rivers was able to capitalize on it; in seven years, he released six albums centered on that one event. Osborn stayed with him for two years and played on all of his albums. The albums were produced by Lou Adler, founder of Dunhill Records. In 1965, he signed the Mamas & the Papas and asked Osborn to play on their first album. When they got into the studio, the engineer was Bones Howe, who Osborne had known since arriving in Los Angeles. Howe started producing music and, between Adler and Howe, Osborn’s career as a session musician was launched.

Just as Osborn had become a bass player with no experience, he became a session musician without knowing how to read music. Fellow session musician, guitarist Tommy Tedesco made him learn. "We'd just go in, learn the song and play. But Tommy insisted on having charts, and he was one of the best readers in Los Angeles. He explained that if you want work, you have to be able to read charts. So I bought a beginner's bass book, read it to page eight to get the fundamentals, and learned the rest in sessions."

Another key figure in Osborn's career was drummer Hal Blaine. "Right from the first beat, it was just magic," recalled Osborn. "We locked in. Just automatically, because we felt the beat in the same place. We didn’t have to work it out—it just was. We could read each other's minds."

The combination of Osborn, Blaine and keyboardist Larry Knechtel became known as the 'Hollywood Golden Trio'. It was Blaine who reportedly came up with the name The Wrecking Crew which was a group of freelance musicians who could read anything and play anything. Beginning in the late 1950s, producers used session musicians extensively, either to produce music for solo artists, or because a band's musicians weren’t strong enough for recording. Usually, a band's musicians weren’t in attendance for the recording sessions. The session musicians were not credited and fans didn't know that the band members didn't play on the albums. Osborn said that this sometimes led to resentment. "They didn’t understand. They'd say 'I'm good enough to play on stage. What’s the difference?' There is a difference. Playing in the studio, playing live–one has nothing to do with the other."

Wrecking Crew members were on call and often put in 16-hour days, recording song after song. Some songs were recorded in a single take, some took an hour. The 7-minute Jimmy Webb song, "MacArthur Park", recorded by Richard Harris, took 6 hours to complete. The process of laying down the basic track for Simon & Garfunkel's "Bridge Over Troubled Water" took a week.

While that song, along with songs like the Association's "Windy", the 5th Dimension's "Aquarius/Let the Sunshine In", America's "Ventura Highway", Neil Diamond's "Holly Holy" or Barbra Streisand's "Stoney End" stand out among the hundreds of hits that he played on, Osborn said that session musicians can't play favorites. "You put in 120 percent every time. If a person from Iowa has saved money to put his kid into the studio and hire the best musicians in the world, how could you not respect that and give it all you got? Most of the time, it’s not good–the song’s not good, the kid can’t sing. But sometimes they come out with great tracks. You can’t write it off just because it’s a demo."

=== Carpenters ===
One such instance of this came about in 1964. Osborn and Johnny Burnette co-founded Magic Lamp Records. They turned Osborn’s garage into a recording studio and paid a young engineer $5 an hour to work with them (that engineer was Jim Messina, later of Loggins and Messina). They produced singles for Jan and Dean, Vince Edwards and a small group of other artists. Musicians would come and go; one night, a horn player appeared with two teen-aged siblings. They were a jazz band called The Richard Carpenter Trio. The 16 year-old drummer, who was Karen Carpenter, was coaxed to sing. Osborn said "That voice! There was magic in that garage". The Carpenters, who were still in high school, hung out at the garage for two years. In 1966, with Osborn on bass, Karen on drums and Richard on piano, Karen recorded two songs which Richard had written: "Looking for Love" and "I’ll Be Yours". Osborn recalled that Karen was a talented jazz drummer and, at 18, Richard was a "very accomplished musician". He knew they were something special. But when Richard asked him to produce their first album, Osborn said no. They had their demo—he sent them to Herb Alpert at A&M Records and they got their record deal. Osborn played on every album of their career.

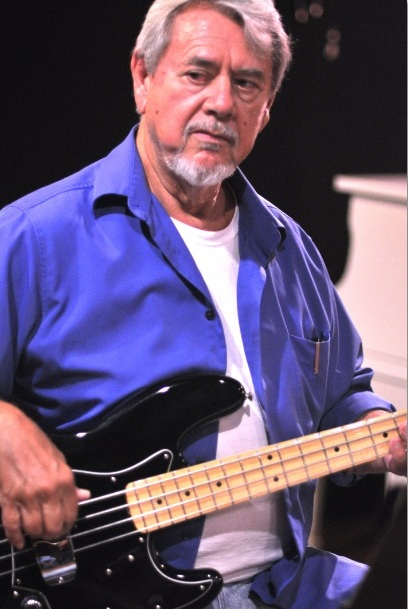
Osborn in 2012.

=== Nashville ===
Session work was all Osborn wanted to do; he turned down many offers to tour, notably from Elvis Presley and Bob Dylan. Osborn said they didn’t pay enough, and he didn’t like playing live because the music never sounds as good. He didn’t listen to music in the car, nor did he listen to music at home. But he and fellow Wrecking Crew members did follow the charts, to see how their music was doing. Osborn said that his average on the Billboard charts was 15 songs each week.

While this was lucrative, it was also stressful. To try to tone down demand, Osborn repeatedly raised his rates, to no avail. He decided to leave Los Angeles. He bought a farm outside of Nashville and, in 1974, moved to Tennessee. There was much less pressure, but he was just as busy. One count listed Osborn as bassist on 53 number one hits on the country charts and 197 that were in the top 40s.

=== Later life ===
Osborn left Nashville in 1988 and settled in Keithville in Caddo Parish near Shreveport. He continued to play and record with Richard Carpenter, played at his church, and recorded some albums at his son's Shreveport recording studio. His last recording, in May 2017, was an album by Micah Harold.

== Personal life and death ==
Osborn was married to Gwendolyn Sue Spears (1937–2008); they had two sons and two daughters. He died of pancreatic cancer at his home on December 14, 2018, age 81. Upon his death, one of his daughters-in-law launched an online fundraising campaign for "final expenses". When he died, Osborn was working on an autobiography. As of 2025, it had not been published.

== Style and equipment ==
Many producers and arrangers chose to spotlight Osborn's contributions by mixing the bass line more prominently than had been customary, and incorporating brief bass solos into their arrangements. His floating slides, hooks, and counterpoints added the distinctive energy and bounce that distinguished L.A.'s hits.

Osborn said that producers usually didn't tell the musicians what to do, but some put them through the ropes. As those were the producers who "didn't know what they were doing", it was hard to remain diplomatic. He said the secret is to not go in with any preconceived notions. "You don't know what you're going to do until you hear the song. If you listen, the song will tell you what to play."

Osborn's instrument throughout most of his recording career was a 1960 Fender stack-knob Jazz Bass, which was given to him by Fender just prior to touring Australia with Nelson. Osborn said he was initially disappointed that Fender had not sent him a Precision Bass, which he had been using, but he said he grew to like the Jazz Bass because the narrower neck made it easier for his short fingers. He strung the bass with LaBella flatwound strings that he did not change for 15 years and his style was distinctive, with a resonant, bright tone produced, in part, by his use of a pick. This guitar is on permanent display at Musicians Hall of Fame and Museum in Nashville, TN.

He had a signature bass, the "Joe Osborn Signature", made by American guitar manufacturer Lakland and since re-named the 'Lakland 44-60 Vintage J Bass'. In 2012, Fender Guitar built a custom Fender Jazz Bass for Osborn according to his desired specifications. He recorded with this bass for the first time when producing and playing bass on teen musician Matthew Davidson's 2014 debut recording.

== Legacy ==
When asked about the legacy of the Wrecking Crew, Osborn replied: "Well, it affected music altogether. And that music will live forever. We were influencing musicians and bands all over the world. We had no idea about that, that we were maybe changing somebody’s life. So without knowing it, that’s what we gave to the world. We taught the world how to play."

In 2008, Tedesco's son Denny released the documentary The Wrecking Crew. Osborn also appears in the 2014 documentary Glen Campbell: I'll Be Me.

== Awards and honors ==
- 1980 Bass Player of the Year, Nominee, Academy of Country Music
- 1981 Bass Player of the Year, Winner, Academy of Country Music
- 1982 Bass Player of the Year, Nominee, Academy of Country Music
- 1983 Bass Player of the Year, Winner, Academy of Country Music
- 1984 Bass Player of the Year, Winner, Academy of Country Music
- 1985 Bass Player of the Year, Winner, Academy of Country Music
- 2010 Inductee, Louisiana Music Hall of Fame

== Discography ==
=== 1962-1970 ===
- The Green River Boys & Glen Campbell –
  Big Bluegrass Special, 1962
- Rick Nelson – It's Up To You, 1962
- Rick Nelson – Album Seven by Rick, 1962
- Rick Nelson – Best Sellers By Rick Nelson, 1963
- Rick Nelson – Rick Nelson Sings "For You", 1963
- Rick Nelson – Million Sellers, 1963
- Rick Nelson – The Very Thought of You, 1964
- Johnny Rivers – At the Whisky à Go Go, 1964
- Johnny Rivers – Here We à Go Go Again!, 1964
- Johnny Rivers – In Action!, 1964
- Johnny Rivers – Meanwhile Back at the Whisky à Go Go, 1965
- Johnny Rivers – ...And I Know You Wanna Dance, 1966
- Johnny Rivers – Changes, 1966
- Lyme & Cybelle – If You Gotta Go Now, 1966
- The Mamas & the Papas – If You Can Believe Your Eyes and Ears, 1966
- The Mamas & The Papas – The Mamas & the Papas, 1966
- Barry McGuire – This Precious Time, 1966
- Rick Nelson – Bright Lights and Country Music, 1966
- Simon & Garfunkel – Sounds of Silence, 1966
- P. F. Sloan – Twelve More Times, 1966
- The 5th Dimension – The Magic Garden, 1967
- The 5th Dimension – Up, Up and Away, 1967
- Keith Allison – Keith Allison In Action, 1967
- The Association – Insight Out, 1967
- Glen Campbell – By the Time I Get to Phoenix, 1967
- Glen Campbell – Gentle on My Mind, 1967
- Don and the Goodtimes – So Good, 1967
- The Grass Roots – Let's Live For Today, 1967
- Harpers Bizarre – Feelin' Groovy , 1967
- Jan and Dean – Save For A Rainy Day, 1967
- The Mamas & The Papas – Deliver, 1967
- Paul Revere & the Raiders Featuring Mark Lindsay – Revolution!, 1967
- Johnny Rivers – Rewind, 1967
- The Stone Poneys – Evergreen, Volume 2, 1967
- Gene Vincent – Gene Vincent, 1967
- The 5th Dimension – Stoned Soul Picnic, 1968
- The Beau Brummels – Bradley's Barn, 1968
- Boyce & Hart – I Wonder What She's Doing Tonite?, 1968
- Boyce & Hart – It's All Happening On The Inside, 1968
- Brewer & Shipley – Down in L.A., 1968
- Glen Campbell – A New Place in the Sun, 1968
- Glen Campbell – Hey Little One, 1968
- Glen Campbell – Wichita Lineman, 1968
- The Ceyleib People – Tanyet, 1968
- The Dillards – Wheatstraw Suite, 1968
- Cass Elliot – Dream a Little Dream, 1968
- The Fun And Games – Elephant Candy, 1968
- Richard Harris – A Tramp Shining, 1968
- Richard Harris – The Yard Went On Forever…, 1968
- Jan and Dean Carnival of Sound, 1968
- Mark LeVine – Pilgrim's Progress, 1968
- Peggy Lipton – Peggy Lipton, 1968
- Maffitt/Davies – The Rise And Fall Of Honesty, 1968
- The Mamas & The Papas – The Papas & The Mamas, 1968
- The Monkees – The Birds, the Bees & the Monkees, 1968
- Rejoice! – Rejoice, 1968
- Johnny Rivers – Realization, 1968
- Simon & Garfunkel – Bookends, 1968
- The 5th Dimension – The Age of Aquarius, 1969
- The 5th Dimension – Portrait, 1969
- Anders & Poncia – The Anders & Poncia Album, 1969
- Paul Anka – Life Goes On, 1969
- Dave Antrell – Dave Antrell, 1969
- James Burton & Ralph Mooney – Corn Pickin' and
  Slick Slidin', 1969
- Glen Campbell – Galveston, 1969
- Carpenters – Offering, 1969
- The Carnival – Carnival, 1969
- Cass Elliot – Bubblegum, Lemonade, and... Something for Mama, 1969
- Cass Elliot – Make Your Own Kind Of Music, 1969
- Fever Tree – For Sale, 1969
- Tom Ghent – Tom Ghent, 1969
- The Grass Roots – Lovin' Things, 1969
- The Groop – The Groop, 1969
- Noel Harrison – The Great Electric Experiment Is Over, 1969
- Dale Hawkins – L.A., Memphis & Tyler, Texas, 1969
- Judy Henske & Jerry Yester – Farewell Aldebaran, 1969
- Thelma Houston – Sunshower, 1969
- Jackie Lomax – Is This What You Want?, 1969
- Chad Mitchell – Chad, 1969
- The Monkees – Instant Replay, 1969
- The Monkees – The Monkees Present, 1969
- Larry Norman – Upon This Rock, 1969
- Tommy Roe – Dizzy, 1969
- Mark Spoelstra – Mark Spoelstra, 1969
- Al Wilson – Searching for the Dolphins, 1969
- The Zeet Band – Moogie Woogie, 1969
- Chet Baker – Blood, Chet and Tears, 1970
- The Beach Boys – Sunflower, 1970
- Glen Campbell – Try a Little Kindness, 1970
- Carpenters – Close To You, 1970
- Jeffrey Comanor – Sure Hope You Like It, 1970
- Neil Diamond – Tap Root Manuscript, 1970
- Dunn & McCashen – Dunn & McCashen, 1970
- Buddy Emmons, JayDee Maness, Red Rhodes, Sneaky Pete Kleinow
  & Rusty Young – Suite Steel: The Pedal Steel Guitar Album, 1970
- Eve – Take It And Smile, 1970
- Mark Heyes – The Words And Music Of Mark Heyes, 1970
- Tongue And Groove Presents Lynne Hughes – Freeway Gypsy, 1970
- Juárez – Juárez, 1970
- Al Kooper – Easy Does It, 1970
- Longbranch Pennywhistle – Longbranch Pennywhistle, 1970
- Sérgio Mendes & Brasil '66 – Stillness, 1970
- The Monkees – Changes, 1970
- The Partridge Family – The Partridge Family Album, 1970
- John Phillips – John Phillips (John, the Wolf King of L.A.), 1970
- Podipto – Podipto, 1970
- Don Randi & Dory Previn – 3 In The Cellar, 1970
- Bob Ray – Initiation Of A Mystic, 1970
- Johnny Rivers – Slim Slo Slider, 1970
- Tommy Roe – We Can Make Music, 1970
- The Sandpipers – Come Saturday Morning, 1970
- Simon & Garfunkel – Bridge Over Troubled Water, 1970
- Paul Williams – Someday Man, 1970
- Robin Wilson – Ain't That Something, 1970

=== 1971-1979 ===
- The 5th Dimension – Live!!, 1971
- The 5th Dimension – Love's Lines, Angles and Rhymes, 1971
- Carpenters – Carpenters, 1971
- The Clingers – The Clingers 1967 - 1971
- Darius – Darius II, 1971
- Jack Daugherty – The Class Of Nineteen Hundred
  And Seventy One, 1971
- George Gerdes – Obituary, 1971
- Billy Joel – Cold Spring Harbor, 1971
- Ken Lauber – Ken Lauber, 1971
- Judy Mayhan – Judy Mayhan, 1971
- Bob Morrison – Friends Of Mine, 1971
- Michael Nesmith & The First National Band – Nevada Fighter, 1971
- Ole Blue – The Baby Maker Original Sound Track, 1971
- The Partridge Family – Up to Date, 1971
- Dory Previn – Mythical Kings and Iguanas, 1971
- Dory Previn – Reflections in a Mud Puddle, 1971
- Punch – Punch, 1971
- Helen Reddy – Helen Reddy, 1971
- Johnny Rivers – Home Grown, 1971
- Johnny Rivers – Non-Stop Dancing At The Whisky A Go-Go, 1971
- Tommy Roe – Beginnings, 1971
- The Sandpipers – A Gift Of Song, 1971
- Paul Simon – Paul Simon, 1971
- Barbra Streisand – Barbra Joan Streisand, 1971
- Barbra Streisand – Stoney End, 1971
- Sandy Szigeti – America's Sweetheart, 1971
- Maxine Weldon – Right On, 1971
- The 5th Dimension – Individually & Collectively, 1972
- America – Homecoming, 1972
- Renee Armand – The Rain Book, 1972
- Debbie Au – Clay, 1972
- Carpenters – A Song For You, 1972
- David Cassidy – Rock Me Baby, 1972
- David Clayton-Thomas – David Clayton-Thomas, 1972
- Climax – Climax Featuring Sonny Geraci, 1972
- Marty Cooper – A Minute Of Your Time, 1972
- Cymbal And Clinger – Cymbal And Clinger, 1972
- Marjoe Gortner – Bad But Not Evil, 1972
- The Hagers – Music On The Country Side, 1972
- Albert Hammond – It Never Rains In Southern California, 1972
- Benny Hester – Benny…, 1972
- Willis Hoover – The Last Outlaw Album, 1972
- Claudine Longet – Let's Spend The Night Together, 1972
- The McCrarys – Sunshine Day, 1972
- The Partridge Family – The Partridge Family Notebook, 1972
- Dory Previn – Mary C. Brown and the Hollywood Sign, 1972
- Helen Reddy – No Mas Canciones Tristes, 1972
- Johnny Rivers – L.A. Reggae, 1972
- Seals & Crofts – Summer Breeze, 1972
- P. F. Sloan – Raised On Records, 1972
- Two Friends – Two Friends, 1972
- David Wagner – d/b/a Crow, 1972
- The 5th Dimension – Living Together, Growing Together, 1973
- Bobby Bridger – And I Wanted To Sing For The People, 1973
- James Burton and Ralph Mooney – Corn Pickin' And Slick Slidin', 1973
- Larry Carlton – Singing/Playing, 1973
- Carpenters – Now & Then, 1973
- Dana Cooper – Dana Cooper, 1973
- The Crickets – Bubblegum, Bop, Ballad and Boogies, 1973
- Neil Diamond – Jonathan Livingston Seagull, 1973
- Kyle Eidson – Kyle, 1973
- Gentlehood – Gentlehood, 1973
- Cheryl Ernst – Always Beginning, 1973
- Percy Faith & His Orchestra – Corazón, 1973
- Art Garfunkel – Angel Clare, 1973
- Jim Grady – Jim Grady, 1973
- Barry Greenfield – Blue Sky, 1973
- Carolyn Hester – Carolyn Hester, 1973
- Albert Hammond – The Free Electric Band
- Shaun Harris – Shaun Harris, 1973
- Sherman Hayes – Catman, 1973
- The Hues Corporation – Freedom For The Stallion, 1973
- Waylon Jennings: This Time, 1973
- Diane Kolby – Diane Kolby, 1973
- Lulu – Lulu, 1973
- Megon McDonough – Keepsake, 1973
- Barry McGuire – Seeds, 1973
- Sam Neely – Two, 1973
- Mickey Newbury – Heaven Help the Child, 1973
- The Partridge Family – Crossword Puzzle, 1973
- Dinsmore Payne – Dinsmore Payne, 1973
- Johnny Rivers – Blue Suede Shoes, 1973
- Sonoma – Sonoma, 1973
- B. W. Stevenson – My Maria, 1973
- T-Bone Walker – Very Rare, 1973
- Andy Williams – Solitaire, 1973
- 2nd Chapter of Acts – With Footnotes, 1974
- The 5th Dimension – Soul & Inspiration, 1974
- Bill And Taffy – Aces, 1974
- Glen Campbell – Houston (I'm Comin' to See You), 1974
- Glen Campbell – Reunion: The Songs of Jimmy Webb, 1974
- Tim Curry & The Cast of The Roxy Theatre – The Rocky Horror Show, 1974
- Wayne Berry – Home At Last, 1974
- John Davidson – Touch Me, 1974
- Doug Dillard – You Don't Need A Reason To Sing, 1974
- Denny Doherty – Waiting For A Song, 1974
- Don Everly – Sunset Towers, 1974
- Chuck Girard – Chuck Girard, 1974
- Albert Hammond – Albert Hammond, 1974
- Thomas Jefferson Kaye – First Grade, 1974
- Barry McGuire – Lighten Up, 1974
- Masa – Take A Ten, 1974
- Terry Melcher – Terry Melcher, 1974
- Sergio Mendes and Brasil 77 – Vintage 74, 1974
- Pratt & McClain – Pratt-McClain, 1974
- Dory Previn – Dory Previn, 1974
- Dig Richards – Digby Richards, 1974
- B.W. Stevenson – Calabasas, 1974
- Lyle Swedeen – Sunshine Inside, 1974
- Pat Boone – Something Supernatural, 1975
- Carpenters – A Kind Of Hush, 1975
- Carpenters – Horizon, 1975
- Cecilio & Kapono – Elua, 1975
- Cliff DeYoung – Cliff DeYoung, 1975
- Lee Dresser – To Touch The Wind, 1975
- Art Garfunkel – Breakaway, 1975
- Nancy Honeytree – Evergreen, 1975
- Randy Matthews – Eyes To The Sky, 1975
- Walt Mills – Sincerely, Walt Mills, 1975
- Renewal – Babes No Longer, 1975
- Johnny Rivers – New Lovers And Old Friends, 1975
- Austin Roberts – Rocky, 1975
- The Sonlight Orchestra – Love Song And Other Greats, 1975
- Lucille Starr & Bob Regan – Lucille Starr, 1975
- John Stewart – Wingless Angels, 1975
- Susan Webb – Bye-Bye Pretty Baby, 1975
- Razzy Bailey – What Little Bit That's Left, 1976
- Jimmy Buffett – Havana Daydreamin', 1976
- Marie Cain – Living Alone, 1976
- J.J. Cale – Troubadour, 1976
- Bill Callery – Bill Callery, 1976
- Chris Christian – Chris Christian, 1976
- Gene Cotton – Rain On, 1976
- England Dan & John Ford Coley – I Hear The Music, 1976
- England Dan & John Ford Coley – Nights Are Forever, 1976
- Don Everly – Brother Jukebox, 1976
- Rob Galbraith – Throw Me A Bone, 1976
- Annie Herring – Through A Child's Eyes, 1976
- Janny – Free Indeed, 1976
- Parker McGee – Parker McGee, 1976
- Barry McGuire – Eve Of Destruction, 1976
- Olivia Newton-John – Don't Stop Believin', 1976
- Mayf Nutter – Goin' Skinny Dippin', 1976
- The Partridge Family – Only A Moment Ago, 1976
- Eddie Rabbitt – Rocky Mountain Music, 1976
- Johnny Rivers – Wild Night, 1976
- Tommy Roe – Energy, 1976
- Kenny Rogers – Kenny Rogers, 1976
- Red Steagall – Texas Red, 1976
- B.J. Thomas – Home Where I Belong, 1976
- Aj Webber – Aj Webber, 1976
- James Barden – Theme From Judas, 1978
- Sandy Campi – Your Smile, 1977
- Carpenters – Passage, 1977
- The Cruse Family – Faith, 1977
- England Dan & John Ford Coley – Dowdy Ferry Road, 1977
- The Jonas Fjeld Band – The Tennessee Tapes, 1977
- Don Francisco – Forgiven, 1977
- Art Garfunkel – Watermark, 1977
- Tompall Glaser – The Wonder Of It All, 1977
- Amy Grant – Amy Grant, 1977
- The Imperials – Sail On, 1977
- Darrell McCall – Lily Dale, 1977
- Miki & Griff – Rockin' Alone (In An Old Rocking Chair), 1977
- Harry Nilsson – Early Tymes, 1977
- The Oak Ridge Boys – Y'all Come Back Saloon, 1977
- Tommy Overstreet – Vintage 77, 1977
- Doug Owen – From The Start, 1977
- Tom Powers – Love And Learn, 1977
- Kenny Rogers – Daytime Friends, 1977
- Kenny Rogers – Ten Years Of Gold, 1977
- B.W. Stevenson – Lost Feeling, 1977
- B.J. Thomas – B.J. Thomas, 1977
- Buck Trent – Oh Yeah! Banjos, Boisterous Ballads, And Buck, 1977
- Dottie West – When It's Just You And Me, 1977
- Roger Wiles – It's A Love Song, 1977
- Larry Jon Wilson – Loose Change, 1977
- Meri Wilson – First Take, 1977
- Albrecht, Roley And Moore – Starlighter, 1978
- Bobby Bare – Bare, 1978
- Carpenters – Christmas Portrait, 1978
- Chester and Lester – Guitar Monsters, 1978
- John Conlee – Rose Colored Glasses, 1978
- Gene Cotton – Save The Dancer, 1978
- Bobby David – Bobby David, 1978
- Gail Davies – Gail Davies, 1978
- England Dan & John Ford Coley – Some Things Don't Come Easy, 1978
- Donna Fargo – Dark-Eyed Lady, 1978
- Steven Fromholz – Jus' Playin' Along, 1978
- Bryn Haworth – Grand Arrival, 1978
- Roy Head – Tonight's The Night, 1978
- Cristy Lane – Cristy Lane Is the Name, 1978
- David H. Lee – Me, 1978
- Dean Martin – Once In A While, 1978
- The Oak Ridge Boys – Room Service, 1978
- Gordon Payne – Gordon Payne, 1978
- Reba Rambo – The Lady Is A Child, 1978
- Johnny Rivers – Johnny Rivers, 1978
- Jimmie Rodgers – Yesterday--Today, 1978
- Kenny Rogers – Love Or Something Like It, 1978
- Bill Woody – Just For You Babe, 1978
- Neil Young – Comes A Time, 1978
- The Belknaps – Born to Win, 1979
- John Conlee – Forever, 1979
- Sonny Curtis – Sonny Curtis, 1979
- Paul Evans – Hello This Is Paul Evans, 1979
- Don Francisco – Got To Tell Somebody, 1979
- Mark Gaddis – Point Of Refuge, 1979
- Gathering – Songs Of Jesus, 1979
- Crystal Gayle – Miss The Mississippi, 1979
- The Geezinslaw Brothers – If You Think I'm Crazy Now..., 1979
- The Hinsons – Prime, 1979
- Ronnie Milsap – Images, 1979
- The Oak Ridge Boys – The Oak Ridge Boys Have Arrived, 1979
- Reba Rambo – The Prodigal According To Reba, 1979
- Kenny Rogers – Kenny, 1979
- The Spragues – The Spragues Arrive, 1979
- Glenn Sutton – Close Encounters Of The Sutton Kind, 1979
- Mel Tillis – Are You Sincere, 1979
- Mel Tillis – Me And Pepper, 1979
- Mel Tillis – Mr. Entertainer, 1979
- Hank Williams Jr. – Whiskey Bent And Hell Bound, 1979

=== 1980-2018 ===
- Johnny Cash – Rockabilly Blues, 1980
- The Coasters – Juke Box Giants, 1980
- Sonny Curtis – Love Is All Around, 1980
- Janie Fricke – I'll Need Someone to Hold Me When I Cry, 1980
- Mickey Gilley – That's All That Matters To Me, 1980
- Merle Haggard – Back To The Barrooms, 1980
- Johnny Lee – Lookin' for Love, 1980
- Frankie Miller – Easy Money, 1980
- The Oak Ridge Boys – Together, 1980
- Charlie Rich – Once A Drifter, 1980
- Mel Tillis – Southern Rain, 1980
- Tanya Tucker – Dreamlovers, 1980
- Hank Williams Jr. – Habits Old and New, 1980
- Andrus, Blackwood and Company – Soldiers Of The Light, 1981
- Bobby Bridger – Heal In The Wisdom, 1981
- Carpenters – Made In America, 1981
- Dave & Sugar – Pleasure, 1981
- David Allan Coe – Tennessee Whiskey, 1981
- John Conlee – With Love, 1981
- Sonny Curtis – Rollin', 1981
- Lacy J. Dalton – Takin' It Easy, 1981
- Janie Fricke – Sleeping with Your Memory, 1981
- Art Garfunkel – Scissors Cut, 1981
- Mickey Gilley – You Don't Know Me, 1981
- Robert Gordon – Are You Gonna Be The One, 1981
- Brenda Lee – Only When I Laugh, 1981
- Johnny Lee – Bet Your Heart on Me, 1981
- Johnny Lee – Lookin' for Love, 1981
- Tim Sheppard – Forever, 1981
- Ricky Skaggs – Waitin' for the Sun to Shine, 1981
- Sylvia – Just Sylvia, 1981
- Roger Whittaker – Changes, 1981
- Hank Williams, Jr. – The Pressure Is On, 1981
- Hank Williams, Jr. – Rowdy, 1981
- Calamity Jane – Calamity Jane, 1982
- Crash Craddock – The New Will Never Wear Off of You, 1982
- Jonas Fjeld – Living For The Weekend, 1982
- James Galway – The Wayward Wind, 1982
- Mickey Gilley – Put Your Dreams Away, 1982
- Richard Kerr – No Looking Back, 1982
- Barbara Mandrell – He Set My Life to Music, 1982
- Barbara Mandrell – In Black and White, 1982
- Louise Mandrell & R.C. Bannon – Me And My RC, 1982
- Louise Mandrell & R.C. Bannon – You're My Super Woman,
  You're My Incredible Man, 1982
- Sandy Mason – Only Love, 1982
- Gary Morris – Gary Morris, 1982
- Harrell Rounds – Rounds & Howard, 1982
- Ricky Skaggs – Highways & Heartaches, 1982
- Russell Smith – Russell Smith, 1982
- Jacky Ward – Night After Night, 1982
- Steve Wariner – Steve Wariner, 1982
- Chet Atkins – Great Hits of the Past, 1983
- Kelly Nelon Clark – Her Father's Child, 1983
- Earl Thomas Conley – Don't Make It Easy For Me, 1983
- The Coulters – Cool Down, 1983
- Father Francis – The Lord's My Shepherd - Father Francis Volume VIII, 1983
- Jack Daniel's Band – Whiskey's Got Control, 1983
- Mickey Gilley – Fool for Your Love, 1983
- Mickey Gilley – You've Really Got A Hold On Me, 1983
- Red Jenkins – Red Jenkins In Nashville, 1983
- Louise Mandrell – Close Up, 1983
- Louise Mandrell – Too Hot To Sleep, 1983
- Michael Martin Murphey – The Heart Never Lies, 1983
- Anne Murray – A Little Good News, 1983
- The Oak Ridge Boys – Deliver, 1983
- Sylvia – Snapshot, 1983
- Mel Tillis – After All This Time, 1983
- The Whites – Old Familiar Feeling, 1983
- Faron Young – Faron Young's Black Tie Country, 1983
- Neil Young – Comes A Time, 1983
- Carpenters – An Old-Fashioned Christmas, 1984
- John Conlee – Blue Highway, 1984
- Earl Thomas Conley – Treadin' Water, 1984
- The Florida Boys – Reaching Out, 1984
- Barbara Mandrell – Clean Cut, 1984
- Reba McEntire – My Kind of Country, 1984
- Nitty Gritty Dirt Band – Plain Dirt Fashion, 1984
- Pinkard & Bowden – Writers In Disguise, 1984
- Ricky Skaggs – Country Boy, 1984
- Sylvia - Surprise, 1984
- Mel Tillis – New Patches, 1984
- The Whites – Forever You, 1984
- Leona Williams – Someday When Things Are Good, 1984
- Bill Anderson – Yesterday, Today, and Tomorrow, 1985
- The Florida Boys – We All Are One, 1985
- Mickey Gilley – I Feel Good (About Lovin' You), 1985
- Billy Grammer – Back Home, 1985
- Amy Grant & Art Garfunkel – The Animals' Christmas By Jimmy Webb, 1985
- Lee Greenwood – Streamline, 1985
- Jim Hudson – Bring Back The Thunder, 1985
- Johnny Lee – Keep Me Hangin' On, 1985
- John McEuen – John McEuen, 1985
- The Nitty Gritty Dirt Band – Partners, Brothers and Friends, 1985
- Ricky Skaggs – Waitin' for the Sun to Shine, 1985
- The Whites – Whole New World, 1985
- Neil Young – Old Ways, 1985
- T. Graham Brown – I Tell It Like It Used To Be, 1986
- John Conlee – Harmony, 1986
- Mason Dixon – The Spirit Of Texas, 1986
- Charly McClain & Wayne Massey – When Love Is Right, 1986
- Ronnie McDowell – All Tied Up In Love, 1986
- Pake McEntire – Too Old To Grow Up Now, 1986
- The Northams – Reality, 1986
- Eddy Raven – Right Hand Man, 1986
- Ricky Skaggs – Favorite Country Songs, 1986
- Ricky Skaggs – Love's Gonna Get Ya!, 1986
- S-K-O – S-K-O, 1986
- Norman Wade – Remember Country With Norman Wade, 1986
- Richard Carpenter – Time, 1987
- Desmond Chambers – Tiger Bom, 1987
- Tompall Glaser – A Collection Of Love Ballads From World War Two, 1987
- Riders In The Sky – New Trails, 1987
- Riders In The Sky – Saddle Pals, 1987
- Art Garfunkel – Lefty, 1988
- Akiko Kobayashi – City Of Angels, 1988
- Dana McVicker – Dana McVicker, 1988
- Johnny Rivers – John Lee Hooker, 1990
- Sergio Mendes & Brasil '77 – Aguas De Marzo, 1991
- Annie Herring – There's A Stirring, 1992
- Richard Carpenter – Pianist, Arranger, Composer, Conductor, 1998
- Steve Howell – My Mind Gets To Ramblin', 2008
- Steve Howell – Since I Saw You Last, 2009
- Matthew Davidson – Cross My Heart, 2014
- Glen Campbell: Glen Campbell: I'll Be Me, 2015
- Micah Harold – Micah Harold – Micah Harold And The Jazzgrass Apocalypse, 2018

== As songwriter ==
Song	Co-writer/s	Year	Recorded by
"Tired And Lonesome Rebel"	Dorsey Burnette	1960	Nick Adams
"Here Comes That Feeling"	D. Burnette	1960	Richard Anthony, Brenda Lee et al
"Town Girl"	D. Burnette	1962	The Brook Brothers, Myron Lee
"School's Out"	D. Burnette	1962	Myron Lee
"I'm A Waitin' For Ya Baby"	D. Burnette	1962	Dorsey Burnette
"Wishing"	D. Burnette	1962	Barry Boyd
"Who You Been Lovin'"	D. Burnette	1962	Barry Boyd
"It Don't Take Much"	D. Burnette, Johnny Burnette	1963	Dorsey Burnette, the Coasters
"No One But Him"	D. Burnette	1963	Dorsey Burnette
"Gypsy Woman"	D. Burnette	1963	Rick Nelson et al
"Mad Mad World"	D. Burnette	1963	Rick Nelson
"Magic Moon"	Dorsey Burnette, Johnny Burnette	1963	Ned Miller
"Daisy Mae"	James Burton	1963	Jim & Joe
"Everytime I See You Smiling"	D. Burnette	1963	Rick Nelson
"Risin' High"	D. Burnette, J. Burnette	1963	Tex Williams
"Hey Sue!"	D. Burnette, J. Burnette	1963	The Canadian Sweethearts
"Walk Myself On Home"	Eddie Rubin	1963	Johnny Rivers et al
"Love"	D. Burnette	1964	Lucille Starr & Bob Regan
"Ever Since The World Began"	D. Burnette	1964	Dorsey Burnette
"Cold As Usual"	D. Burnette	1964	Dorsey Burnette
"Little Acorn"	D. Burnette	1964	Dorsey Burnette
"We're Gonna Stand Up On The Mountain"	D. Burnette	1964	Lucille Starr & Bob Regan
"Little Girl, Big Love"	D. Burnette	1964	Young Billy Beau
"Johnny Come Lately"	Alton Jones	1964	Billie Jean Horton
"Night Winds"	D. Burnette	1965	The Dillons
"Magic Of Love"	D. Burnette	1965	Johnny Jackson
"Jimmy Brown"	D. Burnette	1965	Dorsey Burnett
"Everybody's Angel"	D. Burnette	1965	Dorsey Burnett
"Catch A Little Raindrop"	D. Burnette	1965	Claude King
"Christmas Party"	A. Jones, Burton	1965	Nick Hoffman
"Jimmy's Blues"	Burton, Mickey Jones	1965	James Burton
"Oh What A Night"	A. Jones	1965	The Memphis Men
"One Of These Days"	A. Jones	1965	Tommy Lee (Hasbun)
"Dream World"	A. Jones	1965	Tony Cary
"If You See Me Cry"	A. Jones	1965	Tommy Lee (Hasbun)
"Time And Time Again"	D. Burnette	1965	Brenda Lee
"If You Want To Love Somebody"	D. Burnette	1965	Dorsey Burnette
"Teach Me Little Children"	D. Burnette	1965	Dorsey Burnette, Frank Ifield et al
"In The Morning"	D. Burnette	1966	Dorsey Burnette
"To Remember"	D. Burnette	1966	Dorsey Burnette
"Not Tonight Josephine"	Christian Bruhn	1966	Siw Malmkvist
"Changes"	Mike Deasy	1968	The Ceyleib People
"Ceyladd Beyta"	Deasy	1968	The Ceyleib People
"Sneaky Strings"	Burton	1969	James Burton & Ralph Mooney
"Check It Out"	Artie Butler	1972	The Real Thing
"One Mornin'"	D. Burnette	1977	Dorsey Burnette
"Standing On The Outside Of Her Door"	D. Burnette	1977	Robert Gordon
"All I Knew To Talk About Was Texas"	Jerry Allison	1978	Red Steagall et al
"Sail Away"	Karl Himmel, Nicolette Larson	1979	Neil Young
