= Mythical Kings and Iguanas =

Studio album by Dory Previn
- Released: March 1971
- Genre: Singer-songwriter
- Label: Mediarts/United Artists
- Producer: Nik Venet

Dory Previn chronology
On My Way to Where (1970)	Mythical Kings and Iguanas (1971)	Reflections in a Mud Puddle (1971)

Mythical Kings and Iguanas is the second solo LP by Dory Previn, released in early 1971. Following her successful debut as a confessional singer-songwriter the previous year, it concentrated on the quest for spiritual fulfilment and a loving relationship.

== Track listing ==
1. "Mythical Kings and Iguanas"
2. "Yada Yada la Scala"
3. "The Lady With the Braid"
4. "Her Mother's Daughter"
5. "Angels and Devils the Following Day"
6. "Mary C. Brown and the Hollywood Sign"
7. "Lemon Haired Ladies"
8. "Stone for Bessie Smith"
9. "The Game"
10. "Going Home"

== Personnel ==
- Guitar: David Bennett Cohen, Brian Davies, Peter Jameson, Clark Maffitt, Dory Previn,
  Louie Shelton, Hamilton Wesley Watt
- Bass: Joe Osborn
- Keyboards: Phil Davis, Tom Keene, Larry Knechtel, Tom Sowell
- Drums: Ron Tutt
- Percussion: Paul Humphrey
- Clarinet: Buddy Collette
- French Horn: Marilyn L. Johnson, Gale Robinson
- Cello: Jesse Ehrlich, Raymond Kelley
- Viola: Rollice Dale, Harry Hyams
- Violin: Murray Adler, Henry Ferber, Lou Klass, Bernard Kundell, Joy Lyle, Ralph Schaeffer, Tibor Zelig
- Trumpet: Bud Brisbois
- Trombone: Conte Candoli, Herbie Harper
- Backing Vocals: Abbey Hall Singers, Denny Brooks, B.G. Davies, Floyd Maffitt, Judy Mayhan,
  Michael McGinnis, Peter Morse, West Venet

== Reception ==
- Allmusic link
