= The First Sessions =

Compilation album by Warren Zevon
- Released: March 18, 2003
- Recorded: 1964–1967
- Genres: Pop, Folk pop, Folk rock: Folk pop; folk rock
- Length: 33:28
- Language: English
- Label: Varèse Vintage
- Producers: Bones Howe; Curt Boettcher (on "Song 7" and "Write If You Get Work")
- Compilers: Bones Howe; Cary E. Mansfield

Warren Zevon chronology
Genius: The Best of Warren Zevon (2002)	The First Sessions (2003)	The Wind (2003)

The First Sessions is a 2003 compilation album of early recordings by American rock musician Warren Zevon, including his short-lived folk pop duo Lyme & Cybelle.

== Recording and release ==
The First Sessions represents most of the early recordings from Zevon, when he was a member of the Los Angeles folk rock scene of the 1960s, including his time in the duo Lyme & Cybelle with Violet Santangelo. The compilation is mostly made up of a series of singles the group recorded, along with scattered sessions that Zevon did as a solo artist.

The final two tracks, "Song 7" and "Write If You Get Work", were recorded by Lyme & Cybelle after Zevon had left the duo, and Wayne Erwin had taken over as "Stephen Lyme". Zevon had no involvement in any capacity whatsoever on these tracks.

== Reception ==
The editorial staff of AllMusic Guide gave the release three out of five stars, with reviewer Richie Unterberger emphasizing how uneven the compilation is, going from "nice folk-rock-pop tunes" to "dull" ones. A review in No Depression calls the compilation "missed opportunities" that has several desirable qualities, from the liner notes and design of the packaging, to Zevon's "rapier wit" and a "powerful solo" in "A Bullet for Ramona".

== Track listing ==
1. "Follow Me" (Violet Santangelo and Warren Zevon), by Lyme & Cybelle – 2:29
2. "Like the Seasons" (Santangelo and Zevon), by Lyme & Cybelle – 1:54
3. "I've Just Seen a Face" (John Lennon and Paul McCartney), by Lyme & Cybelle – 1:28
4. "Peeping and Hiding" (Jimmy Reed), by Lyme & Cybelle – 2:30
5. "If You Gotta Go, Go Now" (Bob Dylan), by Lyme & Cybelle – 2:46
6. "I'll Go On" (Santangelo and Zevon), by Lyme & Cybelle – 2:33
7. "Follow Me" (Santangelo and Zevon), by Lyme & Cybelle – 2:18
8. "(You Used to) Ride So High (Glenn Crocker and Zevon), by The Motorcycle Abeline – 2:36
9. "Outside Chance" (Zevon), by Warren Zevon – 2:13
10. "I See the Lights" (Zevon), by Warren Zevon – 2:15
11. "And If I Had You" (Santangelo and Zevon), by Warren Zevon – 2:34
12. "A Bullet for Ramona" (Paul Evans and Zevon), by Warren Zevon – 4:03
13. "Song 7" (Joe Glenn), by Lyme & Cybelle – 2:04
14. "Write If You Get Work" (Joe Glenn), by Lyme & Cybelle – 1:45

== Personnel ==
- Warren Zevon – vocals, bass guitar, guitar, except on "Song 7" and "Write If You Get Work", production on "A Bullet for Ramona"
- Jim Bell – backing vocals on "Song 7" and "Write If You Get Work"
- Ben Benay – guitar on "Song 7" and "Write If You Get Work"
- Lou Blackburn – trombone on "If You Gotta Go, Go Now"
- Hal Blaine – drums on "Follow Me", "Like the Seasons", "Peeping and Hiding", "If You Gotta Go, Go Now", and "I'll Go On"
- Curt Boettcher – backing vocals and production on "Song 7" and "Write If You Get Work"
- Dennis Budimir – guitar on "Follow Me", "Like the Seasons", "Peeping and Hiding", "If You Gotta Go, Go Now", and "I'll Go On"
- Jules Chaiken – trumpet on "If You Gotta Go, Go Now"
- Mike Deasy, Sr. – guitar on "Song 7" and "Write If You Get Work"
- Joseph DiFiore – cello on "Like the Seasons"
- Dawn Eden – liner notes
- Jesse Ehrlich – cello on "Like the Seasons"
- Wayne Erwin – vocals and guitar on "Song 7" and "Write If You Get Work"
- Toxie French – drums on "Song 7" and "Write If You Get Work" (possibly Jimmy Troxell)
- Daniel Hersch – digital remastering
- Bones Howe – percussion on "Follow Me"; "Like the Seasons"; "Peeping and Hiding"; "If You Gotta Go, Go Now"; and "I'll Go On", drums and percussion on "(You Used To) Ride So High", production on "Follow Me", "Like the Seasons"; "Peeping and Hiding"; "If You Gotta Go, Go Now"; "I'll Go On"; and "(You Used To) Ride So High", compilation
- Larry Knechtel – organ and piano on "Follow Me", "Like the Seasons", "Peeping and Hiding", "If You Gotta Go, Go Now", and "I'll Go On"
- Dick Leith – trombone on "If You Gotta Go, Go Now"
- Lynn Malarsky – violin on "Like the Seasons"
- Lee Mallory – backing vocals on "Song 7" and "Write If You Get Work"
- Cary E. Mansfield – compilation
- Ollie Mitchell – trumpet on "If You Gotta Go, Go Now"
- Michele O'Malley – backing vocals on "Song 7" and "Write If You Get Work"
- Joe Osborn – bass guitar on "If You Gotta Go, Go Now"
- Bill Pitzonka – art direction, design, artwork
- Lyle Ritz – bass guitar on "Follow Me", "Like the Seasons", "Peeping and Hiding", and "I'll Go On"
- Sandy Salisbury – backing vocals on "Song 7" and "Write If You Get Work"
- Violet Santangelo – vocals on Lyme & Cybelle tracks, photography (credited as Laura Kenyon)
- Joe Saxon – cello on "Like the Seasons"
- Jerry Scheff – bass guitar on "Song 7" and "Write If You Get Work"
- Tommy Tedesco – guitar on "Follow Me", "Like the Seasons", "Peeping and Hiding", "If You Gotta Go, Go Now", and "I'll Go On"
- Bob Thompson – conduction on "Follow Me", "Like the Seasons", "Peeping and Hiding", "If You Gotta Go, Go Now", and "I'll Go On"
- Jimmy Troxell – drums on "Song 7" and "Write If You Get Work" (possibly Toxie French)

== See also ==
- List of 2003 albums
