= On My Way to Where =

Studio album by Dory Previn
- Released: July 1970
- Recorded: 1970
- Genre: Singer-songwriter
- Label: Mediarts/United Artists
- Producer: Nik Venet

Dory Previn chronology
The Leprechauns Are Upon Me (1958)	On My Way to Where (1970)	Mythical Kings and Iguanas (1971)

Professional ratings
Review scores
Source	Rating
Allmusic	link

On My Way to Where was the first solo LP by Dory Previn, released in 1970.

Dory Previn established herself from the late 1950s as a lyricist for movie songs in Hollywood, in the process being nominated for three Academy Awards. However, by 1970 her marriage to composer and conductor André Previn had disintegrated, following his affair with Mia Farrow and her own mental health problems. She retreated into a hospital, where, as therapy, she was encouraged to write songs of self-analysis. With producer Nik Venet, she recorded On My Way To Where for his Mediarts company, which was later taken over by United Artists.

The album established her as a confessional singer-songwriter, revealing and analysing problems of childhood abuse, mental health and divorce. "Beware of Young Girls" was a sharp attack on Mia Farrow set to the melody of a traditional lullaby. The songs were performed by many of the top session musicians of the time.

In 2013, jazz singer Kate Dimbleby and pianist Naadia Sheriff revisited Previn's body of work—with special attention to the songs of On My Way to Where—in the London cabaret show, Beware Of Young Girls: The Dory Previn Story.

== Track listing ==
1. "Scared to Be Alone"
2. "I Ain't His Child"
3. "Esther's First Communion"
4. "He Lives Alone"
5. "With My Daddy In the Attic"
6. "The Veterans Big Parade"
7. "Michael Michael"
8. "Beware of Young Girls"
9. "Twenty-Mile Zone"
10. "Mr. Whisper"

== Personnel ==
- Dory Previn – vocals, guitar
- Jimmy Bond, Carol Kaye – double bass
- Dennis Budimir, David Cohen, Herb Ellis, Bernie Leadon, John Morell, Tommy Tedesco, John Buck Wilkin – guitar
- Frank Capp – drums, percussion
- Buddy Collette – saxophone, flute, clarinet
- Larry Knechtel, Michael Lang, Don Randi, Joe Sample – keyboards
- Tom Sowell – harmonica, theremin, moog synthesizer
- Ron Tutt – drums
