= Follow Me (Lyme & Cybelle song) =

- US single label

Single by Lyme & Cybelle
- B-side: "Like the Seasons"
- Released: February 1966
- Studio: Sunset Sound, Hollywood
- Genre: Folk rock; jangle pop; psychedelic rock; raga rock
- Length: 2:30
- Label: White Whale
- Songwriters: Violet Santangelo; Warren Zevon
- Producer: Bones Howe

Lyme & Cybelle singles chronology
"Follow Me" (1966)	"If You Gotta Go, Go Now" (1966)

Audio
- "Follow Me" on YouTube

"Follow Me" is a song written and released by American folk rock duo Lyme & Cybelle in 1966. (Note: Stylized in lowercase as lyme & cybelle as a nod to American poet e. e. cummings.) The duo – consisting of Warren Zevon and Violet Santangelo – formed in high school due to an interest in the music of the Beatles. The song was conceived in Santangelo's bedroom, where Zevon played a raga rock guitar riff and asked Santangelo to sing along to his playing. The song has elements of folk rock, raga rock, contemporary jangle pop, and early psychedelic rock with multilayered percussion. The song was recorded at Sunset Sound Recorders with Bones Howe and the Wrecking Crew after Lyme & Cybelle were signed to White Whale Records.

White Whale issued "Follow Me" with "Like the Seasons" on the B-side as Lyme & Cybelle's debut single in February 1966. It became a regional hit in California before charting nationally, reaching number 65 on the US Billboard Hot 100 and number 59 in Canada. The single received positive reviews in the American press, with a few critics noting the similarity to contemporary act Sonny & Cher. Retrospectively, "Follow Me" has been noted for being an early raga and psychedelic rock sound, being influential in the development of the counterculture of the 1960s. It has since been issued on several compilation albums, such as Nuggets: Original Artyfacts from the First Psychedelic Era, 1965–1968.

== Background and composition ==
Warren Zevon, the male half of Lyme & Cybelle.

Lyme & Cybelle were formed in 1964 by Warren Zevon and his Fairfax High School classmate Violet Santangelo, who had formed a platonic friendship whilst singing songs by the Beatles together. Zevon's pseudonym lyme stemmed from the notion that green was his favorite color. From Santagelo's artist name, cybelle was instead chosen from the French drama film Sundays and Cybèle (1962). The origins of "Follow Me" came in late 1965, when it was conceived in Santangelo's bedroom. Zevon played a riff "he had been toying with", which was a psychedelic rock song "suitable for an acoustic duet", additionally being influenced by raga rock in the writing. Santangelo improvised the opening verse after being asked by Zevon to "sing something" along to his playing, eventually finishing up the lyrics "on the spot".

Actor Michael Burns recommended Lyme & Cybelle to his mother, an employee of White Whale Records, resulting in the duo being signed by founders Ted Feigin and Lee Lasseff. Feigin and Lasseff assigned the duo producer Bones Howe, who had "Follow Me" performed to him by Zevon on the piano. Howe was immediately impressed by the song and introduced the duo to arranger Bob Thompson, who "sat down and wrote the musical charts for all the players. The recording session, which was held at Sunset Sound Recorders in Hollywood, Los Angeles, featured "all the L. A. session greats", such as drummer Hal Blaine, keyboardist Larry Knechtel, and guitarist Tommy Tedesco of the Wrecking Crew. In addition to producing the session, Howe also played percussion and introduced Zevon to the jawbone instrument.

Structurally, "Follow Me" was written in the key of A major and has a beats per minute of 103, featuring "Eastern accents" which Zevon described as "raga and roll", that has a rhythmical drone in the guitar and bass. Critic Richie Unterberger calls the song "raga-rock-tinged". Author Peter Gallagher notes that "Follow Me" manages to "fit in all the styles that defined American popular music in 1966" into a length of 2:30. Musicologist William Echard wrote that "Follow Me" was a "lesser known" example of the folk rock-influenced jangle rock without traditionally "folkloric elements". Santangelo sings the first verse, before Zevon comes in during the second verse, singing a counter-melody in a lower register. The song's bass line is "descending" in contrast to the jingle-jangle "Byrds-ian guitar", with an "insistent" drum performance by Hal Blaine. "Follow Me" has a psychedelic middle eight that contrasts greatly to the verses, transitioning into a "polyrhythmic" and "timbrally multilayered" percussioned track intended to evoke a psychedelic awakening.

== Release and reception ==
White Whale Records released "Follow Me" as Lyme & Cybelle's debut single in February 1966, becoming the label's seventh release. (Note: Catalogue number WW-228.) The single's B-side was "Like the Seasons", which was also composed by the duo. The single initionally became a regional hit in California by late February 1966, reaching the top 10 in "many markets". "Follow Me" entered the US Billboard Hot 100 on March 19, 1966, before reaching a peak of number 65 on April 16. The song fared similarly well on the US Record World chart, where it reached 66. On the US Cash Box chart, "Follow Me" only reached number 93. The single saw its strongest performance in Canada, where it peaked at number 59 on the RPM charts. As "Follow Me" shot up the national charts, Lyme & Cybelle were called up to perform live on the Lloyd Thaxton Show, the first on April 23, 1966, together with Jackie DeShannon, and a second time on May 13. According to Santangelo, the duo's performances on the show highlighted Zevon's eccentricity due to the clothing they were wearing.

"Follow Me" rolls along on a chiming raga-guitar line with female and male vocals droning in hypnotic counterpoint like some kind of psychedelic Sonny & Cher. Somehow the song succeeds in being both hauntingly exotic and commercially plausible — a successful marriage of pop, folk-rock and early psychedelia.

— Alec Palao (1998)

In Billboard, the single was described as a "fine vocal duo" and as an easy-going "rhythm ballad", comparing Lyme & Cybelle with contemporary act Sonny & Cher. Similarly, the reviewer from Ottawa Journal states "Follow Me" has "a touch of Sonny & Cher" but with a "simpler" musical background but is a "classy outing". The Cash Box reviewer believes the song to be an "extremely interesting slice", referring to it as a "rhythmic folk-ish romancer" with "effective singing" and noting Zevon's vocal counter-melody. "Follow Me" was played by Feigin and Lasseff to Lyme & Cybelle's labelmates the Turtles in early 1966, with lead vocalist Howard Kaylan stating that the band became "very impressed" and believed "him [Zevon] to sound like an incredible songwriter". (Note: The Turtles later recorded the B-side of "Follow Me", "Like the Seasons", for the B-sides of their own singles "Can I Get To Know You Better" (1966) and "Happy Together" (1967).)

Retrospectively, with a February 1966 release date, many critics have noted the song's early psychedelic and raga-rock influences. Musicologist Alec Palao wrote that the single was a successful blend between folk-rock, pop and "early psychedelia", whilst producer Howe later stated that it was "the first psychedelic record". However, according to Gallagher, this claim "conveniently overlooks" other contenders for that title, such as I Hear a New World by Joe Meek (1960), "See My Friends" by the Kinks (1965), and "Eight Miles High" (1966) by the Byrds. Writer Down Eden does however write that "Follow Me" was influential in the blossoming counterculture scene of San Francisco, whilst Santangelo retrospectively stated Zevon used the phrase "raga rock" before the genre existed. Unterberger calls the song a "catchy folk-rock-pop tune" and notes the vocal counter-melody, but doesn't believe it to be particularly outstanding.

Initially, a cover of Simon & Garfunkel's "The Sound of Silence" (1964) was suggested by Howe to become "Follow Me"'s follow-up, but it was vetoed by White Whale, who suggested Bob Dylan's "If You Gotta Go, Go Now" instead. However, after that single became a commercial failure due to sexual connotations, the working relationship between Zevon and Santangelo started falling apart. Zevon instead turned to studio work for White Whale. "Follow Me" was the first of only three songs Zevon charted on the US Billboard Hot 100 as a performer. (Note: The others being "Werewolves of London" (1978) and "A Certain Girl" with Jackson Browne (1980).) Retrospectively, "Follow Me" has been included on several compilation albums, including the 1998 re-issue of Nuggets: Original Artyfacts from the First Psychedelic Era, 1965–1968, and Zevon's own archival release The First Sessions (2003), where a demo of the song was also issued.

== Personnel ==
Personnel adapted from the liner notes of the 2003 compilation album The First Sessions, unless otherwise noted.

- Warren Zevon (lyme) – vocals, guitar
- Violet Santangelo (cybelle) – vocals
- Tommy Tedesco – guitar
- Dennis Budimir – guitar

- Larry Knechtel – piano, organ
- Lyle Ritz – bass guitar
- Hal Blaine – drums
- Bones Howe – producer, percussion

== Charts ==
Weekly chart performance for "Follow Me"
Chart (1966)	Peal position
Canada (RPM 100)	59
US Billboard Hot 100	65
US Cashbox Top 100	93
US Record World 100 Top Pops	66
