= The Leprechauns Are Upon Me =

Studio album by Dory Langdon (aka Dory Previn)
- Released: 1958
- Recorded: May 1957
- Studios: Radio Recorders, Los Angeles
- Genre: Vocal jazz
- Label: Verve

Dory Previn chronology
The Leprechauns Are Upon Me (1958)	On My Way to Where (1970)

Professional ratings
Review scores
Source	Rating
Allmusic	3/5 stars

The Leprechauns Are Upon Me was the first album recorded by Dory Langdon, in 1958. Some years later she had a successful career as the singer-songwriter Dory Previn.

In 1957, Dory Langdon (née Dorothy Langan) was a lyricist and songwriter who had recently started work for MGM in Hollywood. There, she was paired with various writing collaborators, including André Previn. Although at that point she had had relatively little success in placing her songs in movies, Verve Records signed her up for an album as a singer, accompanied by Previn on piano and Kenny Burrell on guitar. The album, which was recorded in early 1958, featured songs she had written with Previn and other composers. They were witty and romantic in style, typical of the period.

The following year Dory Langdon and André Previn married; they divorced in 1970. Dory Previn, as she was then known, went on to establish herself in a radically different and acclaimed style, as a confessional singer-songwriter with unorthodox subject matter including her dysfunctional childhood and her divorce. The Leprechauns Are Upon Me was reissued as Dory and André Previn in the early 1980s, in the wake of her success.

In 2025, Uncut ranked it at number 448 in their list of "The 500 Greatest Albums of the 1950s", with contributor Jon Dale calling it a "sassy vocal jazz collection" in which Langdon's droll humor is "already apparent", as with "Please Can't We Be Enemies".

== Track listing ==
1. "Can't We Be Enemies" (Gene de Paul)
2. "Lonely Girl In London" (Gene de Paul)
3. "Let Me Show You Off" (Herman Saunders)
4. "My Heart Is a Hunter" (André Previn)
5. "The Leprechauns Are Upon Me"
6. "Warm Winter Day" (Herman Saunders)
7. "Care Free Love"
8. "No" (Lyn Murray)
9. "Sea Shells" (Herman Saunders)
10. "Many Sides" (David Raksin)
11. "Gooney Bird"
12. "Just for Now" (André Previn)
13. "Forget Me" (Ray Henderson)

== Personnel ==
- Kenny Burrell - guitar
- Dory Langdon - vocals
- André Previn - piano
