= Sergio Mendes (1975 album) =

Bossa nova album

Studio album by Sérgio Mendes
- Released: 1975
- Genre: Bossa nova
- Label: Elektra; 7E-1027
- Producer: Dave Grusin, Sérgio Mendes

Sérgio Mendes chronology
Vintage 74 (1974)	Sergio Mendes (1975)	Homecooking (1976)

I Believe

Studio album by Sérgio Mendes
- Released: 1975
- Genre: Bossa nova
- Producer: Dave Grusin, Sérgio Mendes

Sérgio Mendes chronology
Vintage 74 (1974)	I Believe (1975)	Homecooking (1976)

Professional ratings
Review scores
Source	Rating
Allmusic	3/5 stars

Sergio Mendes is a 1975 album by Sérgio Mendes (released in Brazil as I Believe and credited to Sergio Mendes and Brasil '77). This album features vocals by Bonnie Bowden and Sondra Catton. Its the first of two self-titled albums from the artist.

== Track listing ==
1. "Davy" (Bernard Ighner)
2. "I Believe (When I Fall In Love It Will Be Forever)" (Stevie Wonder, Yvonne Wright)
3. "All in Love Is Fair" (Stevie Wonder)
4. "Let Them Work It Out" (Thom Bell, Linda Creed)
5. "Here Comes The Sun" (George Harrison)
6. "If I Ever Lose This Heaven" (Leon Ware, Pam Sawyer)
7. "Lookin' for Another Pure Love" (Stevie Wonder)
8. "Someday We'll All Be Free" (Donny Hathaway)
9. "You Been Away Too Long" (Bernard Ighner)
10. "The Trouble with Hello Is Goodbye" (Dave Grusin, Alan Bergman, Marilyn Bergman)

== Personnel/Credits ==
- Keyboards – Sergio Mendes
- Bass guitar – Chuck Rainey
- Drums – Harvey Mason
- Engineer, Mixed By – Phil Schier
- Flute – Jerome Richardson
- Guitar – Bernard Ighner, David Amaro, David T. Walker, Dennis Budimir, Oscar Castro-Neves
- Percussion – Paulinho Da Costa (printed as "Paola Costa")
- Producers – Dave Grusin, Sérgio Mendes
- Vocals – Bonnie Bowden, Sondra Catton
- Recorded at Record Plant
- Mixed at Westlake Audio
