= Mary C. Brown and the Hollywood Sign =

Studio album by Dory Previn
- Released: November 1972
- Genre: Singer-songwriter
- Label: United Artists
- Producer: Nik Venet

Dory Previn chronology
| Reflections in a Mud Puddle (1971) | Mary C. Brown and the Hollywood Sign (1972) | Live at Carnegie Hall (1973) |

Mary C. Brown and the Hollywood Sign was the fourth solo LP by Dory Previn, released in November 1972. This was a thematic album about Hollywood misfits. The songs were intended for a musical revue that ran briefly in Los Angeles. It was planned to stage it on Broadway, but the previews were poor and the show was cancelled before it opened.

== Reception ==
Professional ratings
Review scores
| Source | Rating |
|---|---|
| Allmusic | 4.5/5 stars |
| Christgau's Record Guide | D |

Robert Christgau, writing in Creem, panned the album, saying "Previn doesn't just belabor a cliche, she flails it with barbed wire, and she never writes about a concrete situation when with extra words she can falsify it with abstraction."

Charles Donovan, for AllMusic, wrote: "Even when writing in cliché she impresses: "The Perfect Man" is her take on the tale of the golden man with feet of clay, and should by rights be toe-curling and unimaginative. Instead, it's an arresting piece with a pretty, counterpoint piano accompaniment. Only the grating honky-tonk arrangements elsewhere disappoint."

== Track listing ==
1. "Mary C. Brown and The Hollywood Sign" (4'41)
2. "The Holy Man On Malibu Bus Number Three" (4'45)
3. "The Midget's Lament" (4'07)
4. "When a Man Wants a Woman" (2'25)
5. "Cully Surroga He's Almost Blind" (5'12)
6. "Left Hand Lost" (4'56)
7. "The Perfect Man" (3'11)
8. "Starlet Starlet On The Screen Who Will Follow Norma Jean?" (2'36)
9. "Don't Put Him Down" (3'55)
10. "King Kong" (3'54)
11. Medley (8'36)
  1. "Morning Star/Evening Star"
  2. "Jesus Was a Androgyne"
  3. "Anima/Animus"

== Personnel ==
- Laurindo Almeida – guitar
- David Cohen – guitar
- Bryan Garofalo – bass
- John Guerin – drums
- Peter Jameson – guitar
- Tom Keene – keyboards
- Michael Lang – keyboards
- Joe Osborn – bass
- Earl Palmer – drums
- Reinie Press – bass
- Dory Previn – vocals, guitar
- Peggy Sandvig – keyboards
- Ron Tutt – drums
