= We're Children of Coincidence and Harpo Marx =

Studio album by Dory Previn
- Released: 1976
- Label: Warner Bros.
- Producer: Joel Dorn, Bill Eaton

Dory Previn chronology
Dory Previn (1974)	We're Children of Coincidence and Harpo Marx (1976)	One A.M. Phonecalls (1977)

Professional ratings
Review scores
Source	Rating
Allmusic	3/5 stars

We're Children of Coincidence and Harpo Marx was the sixth solo studio LP by Dory Previn, released in 1976 by the Warner Brothers label. Apart from the download tracks Planet Blue made available in 2002, it was her last set of recordings.

== Track listing ==
1. "Children of Coincidence""
2. "I Wake Up Slow"
3. "Woman Soul"
4. "The Comedian"
5. "Fours"
6. "So Much Trouble"
7. "Wild Roses (Love Song To The Monster)"
8. "How'm I Gonna Keep Myself Together"
9. "The Owl and The Pussycat"

== Personnel ==
- Dory Previn - Vocals, Guitar
- Wayne Andre - Trombone
- Patti Austin - Vocals
- Phil Bodner - Flute, Clarinet
- David Carey - Percussion
- Ron Carter - Bass
- Francisco Centeno - Bass
- Burt Collins - Trumpet
- Judy Clay - Vocals
- Jonathan Dorn - Tuba
- Bill Eaton - Vocals
- Frank Floyd - Vocals
- Cissy Houston - Vocals
- Peter Jameson - Guitar
- Jack Jeffers - Trombone
- Arthur Jenkins - Percussion, Keyboards
- Hank Jones - Piano
- Keith Loving - Guitar
- Deborah McDuffie - Vocals
- Don McLean - Banjo
- Eunice Peterson - Vocals
- Seldon Powell - Saxophone
- Dom Um Romão - Percussion
- Ernie Royal - Trumpet
- Joseph J Shepley - Trumpet
- Billy Slapin - Flute
- Ted Sommers - Drums
- Ronelle Stafford - Vocals
- John Sussewell - Drums
- John Tropea - Guitar
- Eric Weissberg - Banjo, Bass
- Frank Wess - Saxophone
- Ronald Zito - Drums
