= Vintage 74 =

Studio album by Sérgio Mendes
- Released: 1974
- Genre: Bossa nova
- Label: Bell; 1305
- Producer: Bones Howe

Sérgio Mendes chronology
Love Music (1973)	Vintage 74 (1974)	Sérgio Mendes (1975)

"Vintage 74" is the fourth studio album by Sérgio Mendes and his band, Brasil ‘77. This is the second Mendes album to feature vocals by Gracinha Leporace and Bonnie Bowden.

== Track listing ==
1. "Don't You Worry 'Bout A Thing" (Stevie Wonder) - 3:36
2. "This Masquerade" (Leon Russell) - 4:36
3. "The Waters Of March (Aguas De Março)" (Antonio Carlos Jobim) - 3:56
4. "Waiting For Love" (Randy McNeill) - 4:18
5. "Lonely Sailor" (Marinheiro Só) - 3:16
6. "Você Abusou" (Antonio Carlos, Jocafi) - 3:57
7. "Superstition" (Stevie Wonder) - 5:54
8. "Funny You Should Say That" (Brian Potter, Dennis Lambert) - 3:24
9. "Double Rainbow" (Antonio Carlos Jobim, Gene Lees) - 3:22
10. "If You Really Love Me" (Stevie Wonder, Syreeta Wright) - 3:28

== Personnel ==
- Guitar: David Amaro, Dennis Budimir, Oscar Castro-Neves, Antônio Carlos Jobim,
  Lee Ritenour.
- Mandolin: Oscar Castro-Neves
- Bass: Octavio Bailly, Joe Osborn
- Keyboards: Sergio Mendes
- Drums: Claudio Slon
- Percussion: Paulinho Da Costa, Laudir de Oliveira, Claudio Slon
