= Live at Carnegie Hall (Dory Previn album) =

Live album by Dory Previn
- Released: July 1973
- Recorded: 18 April 1973
- Genre: Singer-songwriter
- Label: United Artists
- Producer: Nik Venet

Dory Previn chronology
| Mary C. Brown and the Hollywood Sign (1972) | Live at Carnegie Hall (1973) | Dory Previn (1974) |

Professional ratings
Review scores
| Source | Rating |
|---|---|
| Allmusic | 2/5 stars |

Live at Carnegie Hall was the fifth solo album by Dory Previn, released in 1973 by United Artists.

The album was recorded live at Carnegie Hall, New York City on 18 April 1973. It was her only live album, and was originally released as a double LP. It drew on her four previous UA solo albums, and was her last release on the label.

== Track listing ==
All tracks composed by Dory Previn

1. "Mythical Kings and Iguanas"
2. "Scared to Be Alone"
3. "I Ain't His Child"
4. "I Dance and Dance and Smile and Smile"
5. "Esther's First Communion"
6. "The Veterans Big Parade/Play It Again Sam"
7. "Don't Put Him Down"
8. "Yada Yada la Scala"
9. "The Lady with the Braid"
10. "The Midget's Lament"
11. "Left Hand Lost"
12. "When a Man Wants a Woman"
13. "Angels and Devils the Following Day"
14. "Mary C. Brown and the Hollywood Sign"
15. "Be Careful, Baby, Be Careful"
16. "Twenty Mile Zone"
17. "Michael Michael"
18. "Moon Rock"
19. "Going Home (Mythical Kings and Iguanas)"

== Personnel ==
- Bryan Garofalo – Bass
- Peter Jameson – Guitar
- Tom Keene – Piano, Harpsichord, Electric Piano
- Bill Lincoln – Guitar
- Dory Previn – Vocals, Guitar
- West Venet – Vocals
- Waddy Wachtel – Guitar, Dobro

== Production ==
- Producer – Nick Venet
- Engineer – Brooks Arthur
- Assistant engineer – Larry Alexander
- Liner notes – Will Friedwald, Paul Pelletier
- Production coordination – Norma Goldstein
- Art direction and design – Elizabeth Yoon
- Design and photography – Mike Salisbury, Lloyd Ziff
- Re-issue producer – Hugh Fordin
