= The Very Thought of You (Rick Nelson album) =

The Very Thought Of You

Studio album by Rick Nelson
- Released: August 3, 1964
- Genre: Rock and roll
- Length: 31:03
- Label: Decca
- Producer: Charles "Bud" Dant

Rick Nelson chronology
| Rick Nelson Sings "For You" (1963) | The Very Thought Of You (1964) | Spotlight on Rick (1964) |

Singles from The Very Thought of You
- 1. "The Very Thought of You" Released: April 1964

The Very Thought of You is the tenth studio album by rock and roll and pop idol Rick Nelson and his third for Decca Records. It was released on August 3, 1964. Jimmie Haskell was the arranger. Charles "Bud" Dant produced the album.

The single, "The Very Thought of You", was Nelson's last US top-forty single for five years, peaking at No. 26. On the Billboard Easy Listening chart, the song reached No. 11, No. 19 on the Cashbox singles chart., while it peaked at No. 65 in Australia.

The album debuted on the Cashbox albums chart in the issue dated August 15, 1964, and remained on the chart for six weeks, peaking at number 72.

The album was released on compact disc by Ace Records on December 9, 1997, as tracks 1 through 12 on a pairing of two albums on one CD with tracks 13 through 24 consisting of Nelson's 1964 album, Spotlight on Rick. Bear Family included the album in the 2008 For You: The Decca Years box set.

== Reception ==
Professional ratings
Review scores
| Source | Rating |
|---|---|
| AllMusic | 2/5 stars |
| The Encyclopedia of Popular Music | 2/5 stars |
| Record Mirror | 3/5 stars |

Richie Unterberger of AllMusic said, "Passable, mostly midtempo pop/rock that did little to either embarrass the singer or raise the listener's temperature. There are obscure songs by Mann-Weil ("I Don't Wanna Love You") and Charlie Rich ("Just a Little Bit Sweet"), but it all sounds like pleasant throwaway filler, the best cut being his cover of the great lost Drifters-like tune "I Wonder" (a small hit for the Pentagons in 1961).

Billboard called it "easygoin' ballads with plenty of teen-sence romantic, and stated That "The beat is gentle and His delivery is in relaxed dual track."

Cashbox called it one of "his strongest LP's" and stated that it "spotlights the songster in a variety of moods and tempos".

Record Mirror called it "late night listening" and stated that "It contains a number of pop standards well performed in a quiet sort of way"

Variety notes "Nelson neatly blends a group of standards with some more recent songs"

Record World stated "Rick mixes old tunes with new and gets a chance to show off his ability with everything."

Joel Selvin described the album as "a lifeless event".

== Track listing ==
=== Side one ===
| No. | Title | Writer(s) | Length |
|---|---|---|---|
| 1. | "My Old Flame" (from Paramount Pictures Belle of the Nineties) | Sam Coslow, Arthur Johnston | 2:10 |
| 2. | "Just a Little Bit Sweet" | Charlie Rich | 2:12 |
| 3. | "The Loneliest Sound" | James Best, Dave Burgess | 2:37 |
| 4. | "You'll Never Fall in Love Again" | Charles Bene | 3:03 |
| 5. | "The Very Thought of You" | Ray Noble | 1:56 |
| 6. | "I Don't Wanna Love You" | Barry Mann, Cynthia Weil | 2:10 |

=== Side two ===
| No. | Title | Writer(s) | Length |
|---|---|---|---|
| 1. | "I'll Get You Yet" | Charles Bene, William D'ella, William d'Elia | 3:00 |
| 2. | "I Wonder (If Your Love Will Ever Belong to Me)" | Ted Goodloe, Jimmy Jones, Joe Jones, Carl McGinnis, Willie Munson | 2:30 |
| 3. | "Be My Love" (from the Metro Goldwyn Mayer film The Toast of New Orleans) | Nicholas Brodszky, Sammy Cahn | 2:20 |
| 4. | "I Love You More Than You Know" | Dave Burgess | 2:49 |
| 5. | "Love Is the Sweetest Thing" | Ray Noble | 2:17 |
| 6. | "Dinah" (from the Broadway musical Kid Boots) | Harry Akst, Sam M. Lewis, Joe Young | 3:57 |

== Personnel ==
- Guitar: James Burton, Rick Nelson
- Bass: Joe Osborn
- Drums: Richie Frost
- Piano: Ray Johnson

== Charts ==
| Chart (1964) | Peak position |
|---|---|
| US Cash Box | 72 |

=== Singles ===
| Year | Title | U.S. Hot 100 | U.S. AC | U.S. Cashbox |
|---|---|---|---|---|
| 1964 | "The Very Thought of You" | 26 | 11 | 19 |
