= X My Heart =

X My Heart may refer to:

- X My Heart (album), a 1996 album by Peter Hammill
- "X My Heart" (song), a 2018 song by Aisel that represented Azerbaijan in the Eurovision Song Contest

== See also ==
- Cross My Heart (disambiguation)
