= Dory Previn (album) =

Studio album by Dory Previn
- Released: September 1974
- Studio: Burbank Studios, Burbank, California
- Genre: Singer-songwriter
- Label: Warner Bros.
- Producer: Nik Venet

Dory Previn chronology
Live at Carnegie Hall (1973)	Dory Previn (1974)	We're Children of Coincidence and Harpo Marx (1976)

Professional ratings
Review scores
Source	Rating
AllMusic	4.5/5 stars
The Encyclopedia of Popular Music	3/5 stars
The New Rolling Stone Record Guide	3/5 stars

Dory Previn is a solo studio LP by Dory Previn, released in 1974. It was her first album for the Warner Brothers label, having left United Artists.

== Critical reception ==
The New York Times wrote that "very few other singer/songwriters can match the wisdom and the wit of Previn whose work turns our psyches inside out."

== Track listing ==
All tracks composed by Dory Previn

1. "Lover Lover Be My Cover"
2. "Coldwater Canyon"
3. "Atlantis"
4. "Mama Mama Comfort Me"
5. "Brando"
6. "New Rooms"
7. "The Empress of China"
8. "The Obscene Phone Call"
9. "The Crooked Christmas Star, '73"
10. "Did Jesus Have a Baby Sister?"

== Personnel ==
- Guitar: David Bennett Cohen, Brian Davies, Peter Jameson, Dory Previn, Waddy Wachtel. Steel Guitar: Dan Dugmore. Bouzouki: Perry Botkin, Jr.
- Bass: Ray Brown, Lyle Ritz, Joe Osborn
- Keyboards: Tom Keene, Lincoln Mayorga
- Drums: Ron Tutt
- Saxophone, flute, clarinet: Buddy Collette
- Violin: James Getzoff. Fiddle: Bobby Bruce
- Backing Vocals: Pat Henderson, Carolyn Matthews, Myrna Matthews, Sherlie Matthews, Marti McCall, Lisa Roberts
