= Dory Previn =

American singer-songwriter (1925–2012)

Background information
- Also known as: Dory Langdon; Dory Previn Shannon; Dory Shannon
- Born: Dorothy Veronica Langan; October 22, 1925; Rahway or Woodbridge, New Jersey, U.S.
- Died: February 14, 2012 (aged 86) Southfield, Massachusetts, U.S.
- Occupations: Singer, songwriter, lyricist
- Instruments: Vocals, guitar
- Labels: Verve; United Artists; Warner Bros. Records
- Spouses: André Previn (m. 1959; div. 1970) Joby Baker (m. 1984)

Dorothy Veronica "Dory" Previn (née Langan; October 22, 1925 – February 14, 2012) was an American lyricist, singer-songwriter and poet.

During the late 1950s and 1960s, Previn was a lyricist on songs intended for motion pictures and, with her then husband, André Previn, received several Academy Award nominations. In the 1970s, after their divorce, she released six albums of original songs and an acclaimed live album. Previn's lyrics from this period are characterized by their originality, irony and honesty in dealing with her troubled personal life as well as more generally about relationships, sexuality, religion and psychology. Until her death, she continued to work as a writer of song lyrics and prose.

== Biography ==
=== Early years ===
Previn was born in either Rahway or Woodbridge, New Jersey, and grew up in Woodbridge, the eldest daughter in a strict Catholic family of Irish origin. She had a troubled relationship with her father, especially during childhood. He had served in the First World War and had been gassed, and experienced periods of depression and violent mood swings. He tended to alternately embrace and reject her, but supported her when she began to show talent for singing and dancing. His mental health deteriorated after the birth of a second daughter, culminating in a paranoid episode in which he boarded the family up in their home and held them at gunpoint for several months. Previn's childhood experiences, described in her autobiography Midnight Baby, had a profound effect on her later life and work.

After high school, Previn attended the American Academy of Dramatic Arts for a year before financial difficulties forced her to leave. She toured as a chorus-line dancer and singer and started to write songs. She later wrote, "I have been an actress, model, and chorus girl. I've worked at odd jobs—secretary, salesgirl, accounting in a filling station, waitress—anything to keep me going while I pursued my writing." At that time, she entered a brief first marriage that soon ended in divorce.

=== Lyricist and marriage: 1958–1969 ===
Through a chance contact with film producer Arthur Freed, she gained a job as a lyricist at MGM. There she met, and began collaborating with, composer André Previn. In 1958, as Dory Langdon, she recorded an album of her songs, The Leprechauns Are Upon Me, with André Previn and jazz guitarist Kenny Burrell accompanying her, for Verve Records. She married Previn in 1959. The couple collaborated on a number of songs used in motion pictures, including "The Faraway Part Of Town", sung by Judy Garland in the film Pepe, which was nominated for an Oscar for Best Song in 1960. In 1961 they wrote "One, Two, Three Waltz" for the movie One, Two, Three, and in 1962 "A Second Chance" for the movie Two for the Seesaw, which won them a second Oscar nomination. They also wrote songs recorded by Rosemary Clooney, Chris Connor, Vic Damone, Bobby Darin, Sammy Davis Jr., Doris Day, Eileen Farrell, Jack Jones, Marilyn Maye, Carmen McRae, Matt Monro, Leontyne Price, Nancy Wilson, and Monica Zetterlund. In 1964, they collaborated with Harold Arlen on "So Long, Big Time!", which was recorded by Tony Bennett. Later in 1966, the song was covered by Carola, accompanied by the Heikki Sarmanto Trio. During this period, Dory Previn wrote lyrics with other film composers for the movies Tall Story, Goodbye Again and Harper.

By the mid-1960s, André Previn had become a classical music conductor, touring worldwide, but Dory's fear of air travel kept her from joining him. In 1965 she suffered a psychiatric breakdown for which she was briefly hospitalized, but continued to write songs with André, including "You're Gonna Hear from Me", recorded by Frank Sinatra, and began to use the name Dory Previn professionally. In 1967, they wrote five songs for the movie Valley of the Dolls. The soundtrack album spent six months on the charts, and Dionne Warwick had a pop hit with her version of the theme song. In 1968, she wrote a new English language libretto for Mozart's The Impresario. The next year, she won a third Oscar nomination for "Come Saturday Morning", with music by Fred Karlin, from the movie The Sterile Cuckoo. A hit version was recorded by The Sandpipers.

In 1968, André Previn had fully moved from composing film scores to conducting symphony orchestras, most notably the London Symphony Orchestra. While in London, he began an affair with 23-year-old actress Mia Farrow, who was working on the film A Dandy in Aspic. In 1969, Dory Previn discovered that Farrow had become pregnant by her husband, which led to their separation. In a cruel twist of fate, Farrow had been married to Frank Sinatra during the time Previn and her husband composed "You're Gonna Hear from Me" which was recorded by Sinatra. Their divorce became final in July 1970 and in September André Previn married Farrow. The betrayal led to Previn's being hospitalized again, where she was treated with electroconvulsive therapy. This seemed to change her outlook as a songwriter, making her more introspective. She expressed her feelings about Farrow and the end of her marriage in the song "Beware of Young Girls" on her 1970 album On My Way to Where.

In a 1973 interview, Previn said: "I'd been writing for films for several years, but nothing I could say in those theme songs had not been said better by many songwriters before me; and gloriously by poets. So what did I do? Did I want to go on and write more poetic lyrical metaphors on things already said? Or did I want to write about the one thing I can only presume to be an authority on: myself?"

=== Singer-songwriter: 1970–1980 ===
In 1970, Previn signed as a solo artist with the Mediarts company founded by Alan Livingston and Nik Venet, and recorded her first album for 12 years, On My Way to Where. Much of it, which like several subsequent albums was produced by Venet, deals with her experiences in the late 1960s. "Mister Whisper" examines episodes of psychosis from within the confines of a psychiatric hospital, while "Beware of Young Girls" is a scathing attack on Mia Farrow and her motives for befriending the Previns. The track "With My Daddy in the Attic" is a chilling piece dealing with Stockholm syndrome and incest. The album's lyrics were published in book form in 1971.

Her second album of this period, Mythical Kings and Iguanas, released in 1971, was even more successful. United Artists Records then took over Mediarts and released her third album, Reflections in a Mud Puddle. It was voted one of the best albums of 1972 by Newsweek magazine, and was included in The New York Times critics' choice as one of the outstanding singer-songwriter albums of the 1970s. "Taps, Tremors and Time-Steps: One Last Dance for my Father", the second side of Reflections In a Mud Puddle, is a personal account of the deterioration of their relationship and her anguish at their differences remaining unresolved at the time of her father's death.

In 1972, she released Mary C. Brown and the Hollywood Sign, a thematic album about Hollywood misfits and Mary C. Brown, an actress who kills herself jumping from Hollywood's letter "H", apparently based on Peg Entwistle. The songs were intended for a musical revue that ran briefly in Los Angeles. Previn teamed up with producer Zev Buffman to stage it on Broadway, but the previews were poor and the show was canceled before it opened.

Previn's albums maintained a balance of intensely personal lyrics and wider commentary. "A Stone for Bessie Smith" is about the premature death of singer Janis Joplin, while "Doppelgänger" examines the latent savagery of humanity. Self-conscious spirituality at the expense of the tangible is criticized in "Mythical Kings and Iguanas", while songs dealing with emotionally frail characters include "Lady With the Braid", "Lemon-Haired Ladies", and "The Altruist and the Needy Case". Feminist issues and dilemmas are explored in "Brando" and "The Owl and the Pussycat", while the male ego is attacked with wit and irony in "Michael, Michael", "Don't Put Him Down", and "The Perfect Man".

In 1973, Previn's screenplay Third Girl From The Left was filmed and broadcast as a TV movie. She also gave some public performances that year, including a concert in New York on April 18, 1973, that was recorded and released as a double LP, Live at Carnegie Hall, which featured in a book of the 200 best rock albums. She also continued to collaborate on music for film and TV. Her last film credit was the title song for Last Tango in Paris (1973), with music by Gato Barbieri.

She then switched to Warner Bros. Records, and released the album Dory Previn in 1974, followed by We're Children of Coincidence and Harpo Marx in 1976. Still unable to overcome her fear of flying, she crossed the ocean on the QE2 to tour in Europe in the late 1970s, and in 1980 performed in a musical revue of her songs, Children Of Coincidence, in Dublin. She withdrew from music for a period, and wrote two autobiographies, Midnight Baby: an Autobiography (1976, ISBN 978-0-02-599000-5) and Bogtrotter: An Autobiography with Lyrics (1980; ISBN 0-385-14708-2). The latter title refers to her Irish heritage: "bogtrotter" is a derogatory term for an Irish person. She wrote Schizo-phren, a one-woman play with songs.

=== Later life ===
From the 1980s, she often used the name Dory Previn Shannon, Shannon being her mother's maiden name. In 1983 she wrote and appeared in a musical statement on nuclear war, August 6, 1945, in Los Angeles. Working for television, she won an Emmy Award in 1984 for "We'll Win this World" (from Two of a Kind) with Jim Pasquale, and an Emmy nomination in 1985 for "Home Here" (from Two Marriages) with Bruce Broughton.

In 1984, she married actor and artist Joby Baker. She performed in London in 1986, and wrote a stage work, The Flight of the Gooney Bird. She last appeared in concert in 1988, in Dublin and at the Donmar Warehouse in London. Her short stories appeared in several publications, and she also worked on a novel, Word-Play with an Invisible Relative. She lectured on lyric writing, recording, and writing autobiographies at various American universities. Baker provided illustrations for The Dory Previn Songbook (1995), which contains songs from her period with United Artists.

In 1997, she collaborated with André Previn again, to produce a piece for soprano and ensemble, The Magic Number. It was first performed by the New York Philharmonic, with Previn conducting and Sylvia McNair performing the soprano part. A piano reduction was published by G. Schirmer, Inc (ISBN 0-7935-8803-0). In 2002, Dory Previn released a royalty-free recording available online, Planet Blue. It contains a mixture of recent and previously unreleased material dealing with environmental degradation and the threat of nuclear disaster. She continued to work, despite having suffered several strokes that affected her eyesight. A new compilation of her early 1970s work, The Art of Dory Previn, was released by EMI on January 21, 2008.

=== Death ===
Previn died, aged 86, on February 14, 2012, at her farm in Southfield, Massachusetts, where she lived with her husband, Joby Baker. In addition to her husband, she was survived by three stepchildren, Michelle Wayland, Fredricka Baker and Scott Zimmerman, and six step-grandchildren.

=== Legacy ===
A feature documentary about Previn called Dory Previn: On My Way to Where has been shown at various film festivals to critical acclaim.

"Dory Previn" is the name of the fourth track on Camera Obscura's 2006 album Let's Get Out Of This Country.

== Discography ==
=== Original albums ===
- The Leprechauns Are Upon Me (1958)—Verve, as Dory Langdon. Reissued in 1983 as Dory & Andre Previn
- On My Way to Where (1970)—Mediarts
- Mythical Kings and Iguanas (1971)—Mediarts
- Reflections in a Mud Puddle/Taps Tremors and Time Steps (1971)—United Artists
- Mary C. Brown and the Hollywood Sign (1972)—United Artists
- Live at Carnegie Hall (1973)—United Artists
- Dory Previn (1974)—Warner Bros. Records
- We're Children of Coincidence and Harpo Marx (1976)—Warner Bros. Records
- Planet Blue—(2002) Download only

=== Compilation albums ===
- One A.M. Phonecalls (1977) United Artists
- In Search of Mythical Kings: The U.A. Years (1993) EMI
- The Art of Dory Previn (2008) EMI

Previn's material from her period with United Artists has been reissued on CD under the Beat Goes On label.
