= Mediarts Records =

Mediarts Records was a small record label founded by former Capitol Records executive Alan W. Livingston and producer Nik Venet.

The label's first release was Dory Previn with On My Way To Where (1970). Other artists signed on the label were Don McLean, Spencer Davis and Peter Jameson, Paul Anka, Odia Coates, Bill Conti, Hello People, and Gerry Rafferty. The most successful album on Mediarts was the comedy album The Begatting of the President, narrated by Orson Welles.

The label was acquired by United Artists Records. The albums by McLean, Previn and Welles were reissued on UA. The acquisition was beneficial for UA as Anka, Coates, Conti and Rafferty had yet to issue albums for Mediarts, but would enjoy hits for UA. McLean had the megahit single and album American Pie for UA.

The Mediarts catalog is now owned by Universal Music Group through its 2012 purchase of most assets and properties possessed by EMI, which in turn purchased UA Records and, going full circle, is managed by Capitol Records.

The first 45 rpm single released on the Mediarts record label was ME-100, "Earth Song"/"Everybody Has Been Burned" by Sioux City Zoo, a group from Fresno, California.

== See also ==
- List of record labels
