= Matthew Davidson =

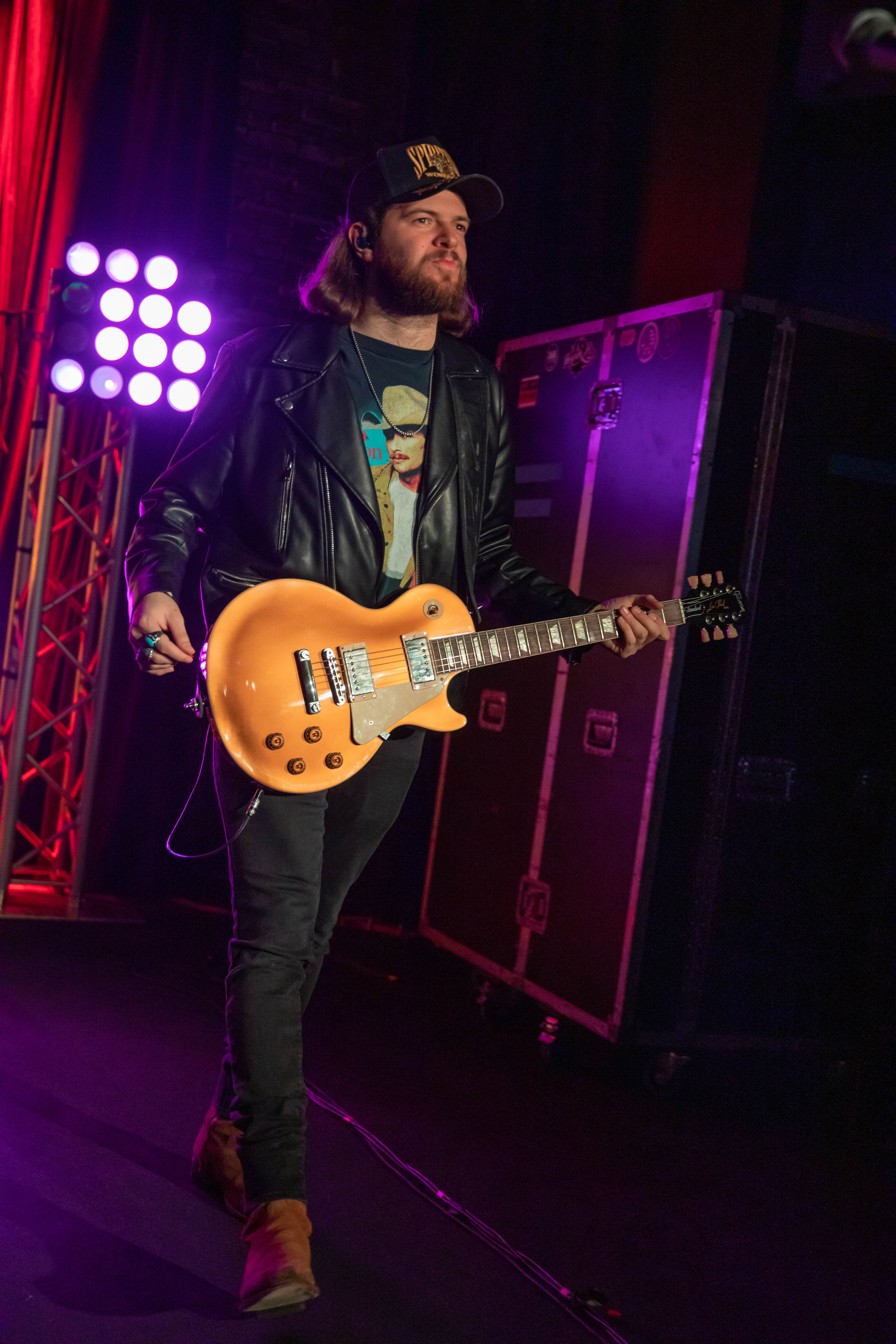
- Matthew Davidson

Background information
- Born: February 18, 1998 (age 28)
- Origin: Shreveport, Louisiana, U.S.
- Genres: Country, Pop/Rock, Blues,
- Instruments: Guitar, vocals
- Website: http://www.matthewdavidson.net/

Matthew Davidson is an American guitarist, singer and songwriter originally from Shreveport, Louisiana and now based in Nashville, Tennessee. He is currently touring with Restless Road. He has also toured with Conner Smith and Travis Denning. He has performed at the Grand Ole Opry, on Today with Hoda and Jenna, and on Broadway in downtown Nashville at venues such as Dierks Whiskey Row, The Stage, Legends Corner, Second Fiddle, and Tootsie's. He graduated in 2020 from Belmont University with a Bachelor of Music in Commercial Guitar.

== Awards and experience ==
Davidson was the winner of the 2011 Robert Johnson Blues Foundation/Gibson Guitar New Generation Award. His debut EP "Step Up" was released in 2012 and produced by bassist Joe Osborn. It was followed by his 2014 EP "Cross My Heart". Davidson was nominated for "2012 Best Emerging Artist" by OffBeat (music magazine) in New Orleans in their annual "Best of the Beat" Awards.

Davidson performed as a guest soloist with The Shreveport Symphony Orchestra in May, 2015. His original song “Read My Mind” was selected as a semi-finalist in the 2014 International Songwriting Competition.

Davidson and his band opened for Austin Mahone in 2014, Fifth Harmony in 2015 and Rachel Platten in 2016.

Photographer Robert M. Knight invited Davidson to join “The Brotherhood of the Guitar” (BOTG). The BOTG is a project launched by Knight and sponsored by Ernie Ball. The BOTG’s purpose is to shine a spotlight on a select group of unsigned up-and-coming young guitar players from around the world. Davidson was the featured BOTG member in the September 2013 issue of Guitar Center magazine.

Davidson was selected by The Grammy Foundation to attend both 2014 and 2015 Grammy Camp in Nashville, Tennessee, hosted by Belmont University. The camp offered high school students a week-long immersive music experience, focusing on all aspects of commercial music and taught by industry professionals. Applicants were selected based on submissions of performance and interview videos.

In 2013, he placed in the Top 10 in an international guitar contest sponsored by Capitol Records and The Beach Boys.

Davidson won his first electric guitar in the 2007 James Burton Guitar Showdown. He was the youngest of eight student guitarists selected to play with Kenny Wayne Shepherd at his 2009 Artbreak Concert. He has played at the B.B. King Museum and the B.B. King Homecoming Concert in Indianola, Mississippi, and the Delta Blues Fest in Greenville, where in addition to his own set, he sat in with Honeyboy Edwards for a few songs. Davidson has played at the Pinetop Perkins Homecoming Celebration and the famous Ground Zero in Clarksdale, Mississippi. Davidson performed at the Dallas International Guitar Festival and in the Youth Showcase at the 2011 International Blues Challenge in Memphis, Tennessee, jamming at the B. B. King Blues Club while he was there. Other venues where Davidson has performed are The Strand Theatre (Shreveport, Louisiana), Temple Theater (Meridian, Mississippi), The Ellis Marsalis Center in the Musicians' Village, New Orleans Mint in New Orleans, and the Shreveport Municipal Memorial Auditorium, home of the Louisiana Hayride. In 2013, Davidson was invited to join Kenny Wayne Shepherd on stage at the 59Twenty Music Festival in Meridian, Mississippi.

He was selected out of several hundred applicants to be the guitarist for the 2011 Kidd Kraddick Rock Camp Band. As part of this camp, Davidson had the opportunity to perform live on the air on the nationally syndicated radio show "Kidd Kraddick in the Morning".

Davidson has had the honor of sharing the stage with Joe Osborn, Jerry Beach, Brady Blade, and Patrick Stump from Fall Out Boy. Davidson's musical taste was largely acquired from listening to his father's CD collection of music by The Beatles, Eric Clapton, Stevie Ray Vaughan, John Mayer and Creedence Clearwater Revival.

== Early career performances ==
The Matthew Davidson Band made their debut on June 25, 2010. They played at The James Burton International Guitar Festival, the State Fair of Louisiana, Independence Stadium, the Krewe of Centaur Parade, the Natchitoches Jazz/R&B Festival, Holiday in Dixie, AlleyFest in Longview, Texas, Fort Worth Mayfest, Grapefest in Grapevine, Texas, The T-Bone Walker Blues Fest in Linden, Texas, Crossroads Music Company in Winnsboro, Texas and the KTBS 3 Independence Day Festival. They were honored to be selected as the Grand Marshals of the Krewe of Aesclepius Mardi Gras Parade. The Matthew Davidson Band performed at the Dallas House of Blues, the Hard Rock Cafe in Dallas, on Red River Radio and headlined the Mississippi Blues Marathon in Jackson, Mississippi. They performed at the 2011 King Biscuit Blues Festival in Helena, Arkansas, the 2012 New Orleans Jazz & Heritage Festival, the 2012 Natchitoches Christmas Festival, the 2013 Baton Rouge FestForAll and the 2013 Louisiana Seafood Festival in New Orleans.

== Independent albums ==
| Title | Details |
|---|---|
| Cross My Heart | Release date: April 8, 2014; Label: Magnet Music; Formats: CD, Digital download |
| Heartbreaker | Release date: Sept. 10, 2013; Label: Magnet Music; Formats: Single - Digital download |
| Step Up | Release date: August 18, 2012; Label: Magnet Music; Formats: CD, Digital download |
