= Southfield, Massachusetts =

- Village
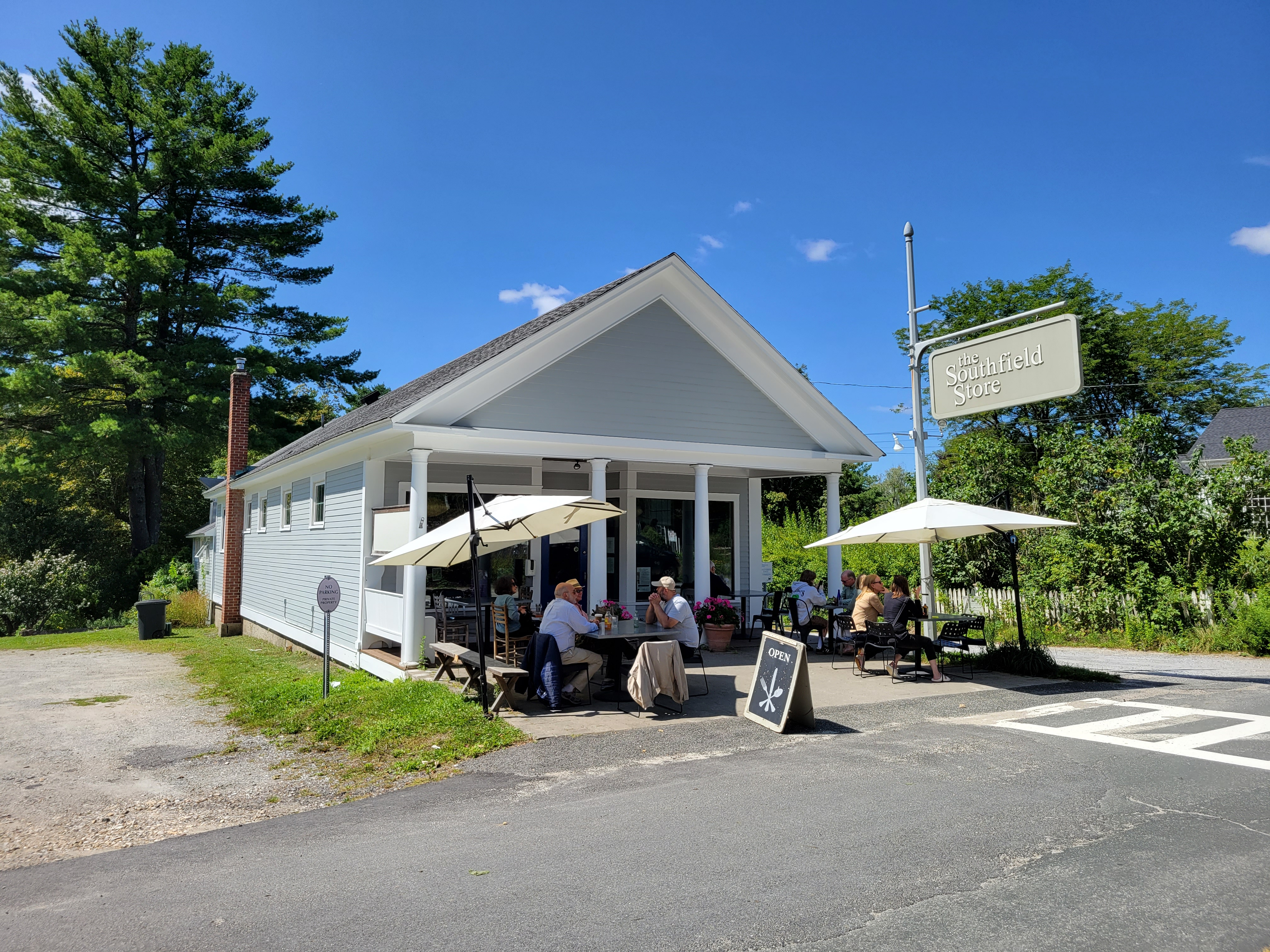
- Southfield Store

- Location within Massachusetts
- Coordinates: 42°6′3.6″N 73°14′1.2″W
- Country: United States
- State: Massachusetts
- County: Berkshire
- Town: New Marlborough
- Elevation: 1,211 ft (369 m)
- Time zone: UTC-5 (Eastern (EST))
  - Summer (DST): UTC-4 (EDT)
- ZIP Code: 01259
- GNIS feature ID: 607726

Southfield is a village located at the junction of Norfolk and East Hill Roads within the town of New Marlborough in Berkshire County, Massachusetts, United States. It is also a post office location for the surrounding area, with ZIP Code 01259.

== Geography ==
Southfield is located at 42°6′3.6″N 73°14′1.2″W (42.1014802, -73.2328889).

== History ==
Southfield was named in 1775 for its location in the southwestern portion of the state.
