= Alan W. Livingston =

American businessman

- Born: Alan Wendell Levison; October 15, 1917; McDonald, Pennsylvania, U.S.
- Died: March 13, 2009 (aged 91); Beverly Hills, California, U.S.
- Education: Wharton School of the University of Pennsylvania (B.S.)
- Occupation: Music executive
- Spouses: Elaine Osterweil (m. 1942; div. 1955) Betty Hutton (m. 1955; div. 1960) Nancy Olson (m. 1962)
- Children: 3

Alan Wendell Livingston (né Levison; October 15, 1917 – March 13, 2009) was an American music and television executive and record producer. He joined Capitol Records after the Second World War, where he created Bozo the Clown for a successful series of children's record-and-book sets and later became vice president in charge of the company's creative operations. In that role, he signed Frank Sinatra and was involved in the recordings that helped revive Sinatra's career in the early 1950s.

After leaving Capitol, Livingston became president of California National Productions and vice president of television programming at NBC, where he hired David Dortort to develop Bonanza. He returned to Capitol in 1960 as president and later chairman, shifted the label towards rock music, and in 1963 agreed to release the Beatles' "I Want to Hold Your Hand" after Capitol had rejected their previous singles. Livingston later founded Mediarts, Inc. and held senior executive positions at 20th Century Fox and Atalanta Investment Company.

== Early years ==
Livingston was born to Jewish parents in the Pittsburgh suburb of McDonald, Pennsylvania on October 15, 1917. He was the youngest of three children, whose mother encouraged reading books and playing musical instruments. He had an older sister, Vera, and an older brother, Jay Livingston (1915–2001), who wrote or co-wrote many popular songs for films and television, including "Buttons and Bows", "Mona Lisa", "Whatever Will Be, Will Be (Que Sera, Sera)", as well as the popular Christmas song "Silver Bells".

Alan Livingston began his career in the entertainment business leading his own college orchestra as a student at the University of Pennsylvania. After graduating from the Wharton School of Finance and Commerce with a B.S. in economics, he moved to New York where he worked in advertising for three years. At the start of World War II, he enlisted in the U.S. Army as a private and served as a second lieutenant in the infantry. After his discharge, he borrowed some money, hitched a ride on an Army plane and headed for Los Angeles, California where he obtained his first position with Capitol Records, Inc. in Hollywood as a writer/producer.

== Capitol Records ==
Livingston's initial assignment was to create a children's record library for the four-year-old company, for which he created the "Bozo the Clown" character. He wrote and produced a popular series of storytelling record-album and illustrative read-along book sets beginning with the October 1946 release of "Bozo at the Circus." His record-reader concept, which enabled children to read and follow a story in pictures while listening to it, was the first of its kind. The Bozo image was a composite design of Livingston's, derived from a variety of clown pictures and given to an artist to turn into comic-book-like illustrations. Livingston then hired Pinto Colvig to portray Bozo on the recordings. Colvig, a former circus clown, was also the original voice of Walt Disney's Pluto, Goofy, Grumpy, Sleepy and many other characters. Billy May produced the music. The series turned out to be a smash hit for Capitol, selling over eight million albums in the late 1940s and early 1950s. Successful record sales led to a variety of Bozo-related merchandise and the first television series, "Bozo's Circus," starring Pinto Colvig on KTTV-Channel 11 (CBS) in Los Angeles in 1949. The character also became a mascot for the record company and was later nicknamed "Bozo the Capitol Clown."

Livingston wrote and produced many other children's recordings including products for Walt Disney; Walter Lantz's Woody Woodpecker; Bugs Bunny and all of the Warner Bros. characters. In the case of the latter, he wrote the 1951 pop hit "I Tawt I Taw A Puddy Tat" for Mel Blanc's Tweety Pie. There were also several record-readers featuring the popular cowboy character, Hopalong Cassidy. One of these was "Hopalong Cassidy and The Singing Bandit" in 1950, which was the first children's record set to make the Top Ten charts.

Within a few years, Livingston moved on to the adult music arena and became vice president in charge of all creative operations of the company. He signed Frank Sinatra when Sinatra was at a low point in his career. Livingston wanted Sinatra to work with arranger Nelson Riddle, however Sinatra was reluctant to do so out of his loyalty to Axel Stordahl with whom he had worked for most of his career. The first Sinatra/Stordahl recordings for Capitol failed to produce the magic Livingston and producer Voyle Gilmore were looking for, and Sinatra agreed to try a session with Billy May on April 30, 1953, but instead Livingston booked Riddle, telling Sinatra that May had to unexpectedly leave town for a live performance. The impact was immediate, producing the classic "I've Got the World on a String". However, it was "Young at Heart" that became the defining moment in Sinatra's comeback, peaking at #2 during its 22-week run on the charts in the spring of 1954.

Livingston was credited as the creative force responsible for Capitol Records' growth from net sales of $6 million per year to sales in excess of $100 million per year.

He was also officially credited as the inspiration for the distinctive Capitol Records Tower, completed in April 1956, noted for being the first circular office building in the world.

Livingston is also responsible for what have come to be known as the "Butcher Covers." When The Beatles released their 1966 album Yesterday and Today it was initially released with a surreal Robert Whitaker cover photograph depicting the group draped in slabs of meat and dismembered doll parts. Protests from record dealers forced Capitol to immediately recall the album and re-issue it with a new cover. The original covers, in any condition, have become highly sought-after collector's items. Shortly after the controversy erupted, Livingston took home a box containing both mono and stereo copies of the original "Butcher cover" albums, sealed and in pristine condition. They remained in storage at the Livingston home, untouched, for the next twenty years until Livingston's son Peter revealed their existence when he brought several of the albums to sell at a Beatlefest convention in 1987. These Butcher covers are considered the best examples of these albums and currently command a premium price upwards of $20,000.

== California Productions and NBC ==
After 10 years with Capitol, Livingston and the company sold the "Bozo the Clown" licensing rights (excluding the recordings) to Larry Harmon, one of several people hired to portray the character at promotional appearances; Livingston left the company to accept a position as president of California National Productions, Inc., the wholly owned film production subsidiary of the National Broadcasting Company. Shortly thereafter, Livingston was also named vice president of NBC, in charge of television network programming, dealing principally with all films made for the network. In this capacity, he hired David Dortort to write and produce the pilot for the series Bonanza for which Livingston's older brother, songwriter Jay Livingston, wrote the memorable theme. During this time, Alan Livingston also served on the boards of Bob Hope Enterprises, Inc. and Joseph Mankiewicz's motion picture production company, Figaro, Inc.

== Return to Capitol ==
In 1960, Capitol Records induced Livingston to return as president and, eventually, chairman of the board. He was also named to the Board of Electric and Musical Industries (EMI), a British corporation that was the largest stockholder in Capitol. Subsequently, he merged Capitol Records into Audio Devices, Inc., a magnetic tape manufacturer listed on the American Stock Exchange, and changed the name of the surviving company to Capitol Industries, Inc., of which Livingston was named president. It was during this period that he turned Capitol Records into a more rock-oriented company with such artists as The Beach Boys, Steve Miller, The Band, and others. His most noteworthy accomplishment at that time was agreeing to release The Beatles' "I Want to Hold Your Hand" for Capitol in 1963, after rejecting all their previous singles as unsuitable for the U.S. market despite Capitol being owned by The Beatles' U.K. record company, EMI.

== Later ventures ==
Livingston later sold his stock in Capitol Industries to form his own company, Mediarts, Inc., for the production of motion pictures, records and music publishing. He eventually sold his interest in that company to United Artists as a result, particularly, of its success in the record business including Don McLean, who reached the #1 position in the country with his "American Pie" single and album in 1972. Two feature motion pictures were completed during the company's operation: Downhill Racer (1969) starring Robert Redford and Gene Hackman, and Unman, Wittering and Zigo (1971) starring David Hemmings; both released by Paramount Pictures.

In August 1976, Livingston joined Twentieth Century Fox Film Corporation as Senior Vice President and President, Entertainment Group. He left in 1980 to accept the presidency of Atalanta Investment Company, Inc., and resigned in 1987 to produce a one-hour television adaptation of Sparky's Magic Piano, and to form Pacific Rim Productions, Inc. for animation services.

Livingston also wrote a novel titled Ronnie Finkelhof, Superstar about a shy Harvard pre-law student who becomes an overnight success as a rock musician. It was published by Ballantine Books in the spring of 1988.

On August 1, 1998, Livingston received his first honor for his creation of "Bozo the Clown" as the International Clown Hall of Fame in Milwaukee, Wisconsin presented him their Lifetime of Laughter Achievement Award.

His first two marriages, one to actress Betty Hutton, ended in divorce. Livingston's third and final marriage was to actress Nancy Olson (formerly married to Alan Jay Lerner), whose film credits include Sunset Boulevard (1950) and The Absent-Minded Professor (1961). They resided in Beverly Hills, California. Their son, Christopher Livingston, is a movie producer, director, writer and songwriter. He also had a daughter, jewelry designer Laura Livingston Gibson, from a previous marriage.

== Death ==
Livingston died after a series of mini-strokes at his home in Beverly Hills, California at the age of 91.

In addition to his wife, son and daughter, he was survived by two stepdaughters, Liza and Jennifer Lerner. His elder son, Peter Wendell Livingston, a literary agent and bestselling author, pre-deceased him in 1991.
