= Dennis Budimir =

American jazz and rock guitarist (1938–2023)

- Born: Dennis Matthew Budimir; June 20, 1938; Los Angeles, California, U.S.
- Died: January 10, 2023 (aged 84)
- Genres: Jazz; pop; rock; soul
- Occupation: Musician
- Instrument: Guitar
- Formerly of: The Wrecking Crew

Dennis Matthew Budimir (June 20, 1938 – January 10, 2023) was an American jazz and rock guitarist. He was considered to be a member of the Wrecking Crew.

== Biography ==
Budimir learned to play piano and guitar in his youth and first played professionally when he was fourteen years old. In Los Angeles in the mid-1950s he played in a quartet with La Monte Young, Billy Higgins, and Don Cherry. In the late 1950s he worked in the bands of Ken Hanna, Keith Williams, Harry James, and Chico Hamilton. In 1960–1961 he worked with Bud Shank and accompanied Peggy Lee, then entered into military service in 1961.

After his discharge in 1963 he toured Japan with Bobby Troup and returned to the Los Angeles area, where he played as a studio musician for the next several decades. He recorded in this capacity with Joni Mitchell, The Carpenters, Brian Wilson, Barbra Streisand, Ravi Shankar, Frank Zappa, Linda Ronstadt, Julie London, Dusty Springfield, Dave Grusin, Quincy Jones, David Axelrod, Lalo Schifrin, Marty Paich, Don Ellis, Gil Melle, Tom Waits, Harry Nilsson, George Harrison, Ringo Starr, Johnny Mathis, Cher, and Doris Day. In jazz idioms he worked with Ella Fitzgerald, Milt Jackson, Stan Getz, Jimmy Smith in the 1970s and with Ray Brown and Johnny Mandel. He recorded with the Capp-Pierce Juggernaut in the 1990s. As a session player he also played on more than 900 movie soundtracks from the early 1960s until the 2000s.

Budimir died on January 10, 2023, at the age of 84.

== Discography ==
=== As leader ===
- The Creeper (Mainstream, 1965)
- Alone Together (Revelation, 1967)
- A Second Coming (Revelation, 1968)
- Sprung Free! (Revelation, 1968)
- The Session with Albert (Revelation, 1972)
- The Soul of Dennis Budimir (self-released, 2012)

=== As sideman ===
With Alessi Brothers

- Alessi (A&M, 1976)

With David Axelrod

- Earth Rot (Capitol, 1970)

With The Association

- Insight Out (Warner Bros., 1967)
- Birthday (Warner Bros., 1968)

With Bobby Caldwell

- Stuck On You (Sin-Drome, 1991)
- Blue Condition (Sin-Drome, 1996)
- Solid Ground (RCA Victor, 2013)

With Bill Conti

- Rocky II (United Artists, 1979)
- Blood in Blood Out (Varèse Sarabande, 1993)
- The Right Stuff (Varèse Sarabande, 2009)

With The 5th Dimension

- The Magic Garden (Soul City, 1967)
- The Age of Aquarius (Soul City, 1969)
- Portrait (Bell, 1970)
- Love's Lines, Angles and Rhymes (Bell, 1971)
- Individually & Collectively (Bell, 1972)
- Living Together, Growing Together (Bell, 1973)
- Soul & Inspiration (Bell, 1974)
- Earthbound (ABC, 1975)

With Judith Durham

- Gift of Song (A&M, 1970)

With Michael Feinstein

- Remember: Michael Feinstein Sings Irving Berlin (Parnassus, 1987)
- Isn't It Romantic (Elektra, 1988)
- Forever (Elektra, 1993)
- Big City Rhythms (Concord, 1999)

With Chico Hamilton

- With Strings Attached (Warner Bros., 1959)
- Gongs East! (Warner Bros., 1959)
- The Three Faces of Chico (Warner Bros., 1959)
- Chico Hamilton (Warner Bros., 1976)
- Truth (Fresh Sound, 1979)

With Milt Jackson

- Feelings (Pablo, 1976)
- Soul Believer (Pablo, 1979)
- Big Mouth (Pablo, 1981)

With Quincy Jones

- The Hot Rock (Prophesy, 1972)
- You've Got It Bad Girl (A&M, 1973)
- Mellow Madness (A&M, 1975)
- The Color Purple (Qwest, 1986)

With Peggy Lee

- If You Go (Capitol, 1961)
- Blues Cross Country (Capitol, 1962)
- In Love Again! (Capitol, 1964)
- Pass Me By (Capitol, 1965)
- Guitars a là Lee (Capitol, 1966)
- Big $pender (Capitol, 1966)
- Somethin' Groovy! (Capitol, 1967)
- Make It with You (Capitol, 1970)
- Let's Love (Atlantic, 1974)
- Mirrors (A&M, 1975)
- Close Enough for Love (DRG, 1979)

With Jon Lucien

- Song for My Lady (Columbia, 1975)
- Premonition (Columbia, 1976)
- Romantico (Zemajo, 1980)

With Henry Mancini

- Symphonic Soul (RCA Victor, 1975)
- The Cop Show Themes (RCA Victor, 1976)
- Mancini's Angels (RCA Victor, 1977)
- The Theme Scene (RCA Victor, 1978)

With Sérgio Mendes

- Love Music (Bell, 1973)
- Vintage 74 (Bell, 1974)
- Sergio Mendes (Elektra, 1975)
- Homecooking (Elektra, 1976)

With Harry Nilsson

- Aerial Ballet (RCA Victor, 1968)
- The Point! (RCA Victor, 1971)
- Duit on Mon Dei (RCA Victor, 1975)
- ...That's the Way It Is (RCA Victor, 1976)

With Robert Palmer

- Heavy Nova (EMI, 1988)
- Don't Explain (EMI, 1990)
- Ridin' High (EMI, 1992)

With The Partridge Family

- The Partridge Family Album (Bell, 1970)
- Sound Magazine (Bell, 1971)
- Up to Date (Bell, 1971)
- A Partridge Family Christmas Card (Bell, 1971)
- The Partridge Family Notebook (Bell, 1972)
- Shopping Bag (Bell, 1972)
- Crossword Puzzle (Bell, 1973)

With Linda Ronstadt

- What's New (Asylum, 1983)
- For Sentimental Reasons (Asylum, 1986)

With Tom Scott

- The Honeysuckle Breeze (Impulse!, 1967)
- Tom Scott in L.A. (Flying Dutchman, 1975)
- Blow It Out (Ode, 1977)

With Bud Shank

- Barefoot Adventure (Pacific Jazz, 1961)
- New Groove (Pacific Jazz, 1961)
- Bud Shank and the Sax Section (Pacific Jazz, 1966)
- Girl in Love (World Pacific, 1966)
- A Spoonful of Jazz (World Pacific, 1967)
- Plays Music from Today's Movies (World Pacific, 1967)
- Magical Mystery (World Pacific, 1968)
- Let It Be (World Pacific, 1970)

With Frank Sinatra

- That's Life (Reprise, 1966)
- The World We Knew (Reprise, 1967)
- Sinatra & Company (Reprise, 1971)
- Ol' Blue Eyes Is Back (Reprise, 1973)

With others

- Steve Allen, Soulful Brass No. 2 (Flying Dutchman, 1969)
- Gene Ammons, Free Again (Prestige 1972)
- Julie Andrews, Love Julie (USA, 1987)
- Paul Anka, Headlines (RCA Victor, 1979)
- Paul Anka, Toi et Moi (Ariola, 1979)
- The Association, Birthday (Now Sounds, 2010)
- Burt Bacharach, Blue Note Plays Burt Bacharach (Blue Note, 2004)
- The Beach Boys, Keepin' the Summer Alive (CBS, 1980)
- Willie Bobo, Tomorrow Is Here (Blue Note, 2012)
- Debby Boone, Debby Boone (Capitol Records, 1979)
- Perry Botkin Jr., Ports (A&M, 1977)
- Teresa Brewer, Music, Music, Music (Amsterdam, 1973)
- Bobby Bryant, Swahili Strut (Cadet, 1970)
- Ralph Burns, In the Mood (Atlantic, 1987)
- Glen Campbell, Burning Bridges (Capitol, 1967)
- Glen Campbell, The Glen Campbell Goodtime Album (Capitol, 1970)
- Glen Campbell, I Remember Hank Williams (Capitol, 1973)
- The Capp-Pierce Juggernaut, In a Hefti Bag (Concord Jazz, 1995)
- The Carpenters, Made in America (A&M, 1981)
- The Carpenters, Voice of the Heart (A&M, 1983)
- Keith Carradine, I'm Easy (Asylum, 1976)
- Barbara Carroll, Barbara Carroll (Blue Note, 1976)
- Clarence Carter, Real (ABC, 1974)
- David Cassidy, Cherish (Bell, 1972)
- Cher, Stars (Warner Bros., 1975)
- Rosemary Clooney, Dedicated to Nelson (Concord Jazz, 1996)
- Rosemary Clooney, Mothers & Daughters (Concord Jazz, 1997)
- Natalie Cole, Unforgettable... with Love (Elektra, 1991)
- Judy Collins, Hard Times for Lovers (Elektra, 1979)
- Perry Como, Today (RCA, 1987)
- Les Crane, Desiderata (Warner Bros., 1971)
- Sonny Criss, Warm & Sonny (Impulse!, 1976)
- Bobby Darin, If I Were a Carpenter (Atlantic, 1966)
- Diana DeGarmo, Blue Skies (RCA, 2004)
- Cliff DeYoung, Cliff De Young (MCA, 1975)
- Neil Diamond, Serenade (Columbia, 1974)
- Dion DiMucci, Born to Be with You (Collectable, 1975)
- Danny Elfman, Mars Attacks! (La-La Land, 2009)
- Cass Elliot, Cass Elliot (RCA Victor, 1972)
- Victor Feldman, The Venezuela Joropo (Pacific Jazz, 1967)
- Clare Fischer, So Danco Samba (World Pacific, 1965)
- Ella Fitzgerald, Things Ain't What They Used to Be and You Better Believe It (Reprise, 1971)
- Bob Florence, Pet Project (World Pacific, 1967)
- Gary Foster, Subconsciously (Revelation, 1968)
- Rodney Franklin, In the Center (Columbia, 1978)
- Rodney Franklin, Rodney Franklin (Columbia, 1980)
- Dominic Frontiere, On Any Sunday (Bell, 1971)
- Dominic Frontiere, Washington: Behind Closed Doors (ABC, 1977)
- Kelly Garrett, Kelly (RCA, 1976)
- Bobbie Gentry, The Delta Sweete (Capitol, 1968)
- Dizzy Gillespie, Gil Fuller & the Monterey Jazz Festival Orchestra Featuring Dizzy Gillespie (Pacific Jazz, 1965)
- Benny Golson, I'm Always Dancin' to the Music (Columbia, 1978)
- Lesley Gore, Love Me By Name (A&M Records, 1976)
- Amy Grant, A Christmas to Remember (A&M, 1999)
- Cyndi Grecco, Making Our Dreams Come True (Private Stock Records, 1976)
- Lani Hall, Sweet Bird (A&M, 1976)
- Johnny Hartman, Unforgettable Songs by Johnny Hartman (ABC, 1966)
- Johnny Hartman, I Love Everybody (ABC, 1967)
- Lee Holdridge, The Other Side of the Mountain Part 2 (MCA, 1978)
- Richard "Groove" Holmes, Workin' On a Groovy Thing (World Pacific, 1969)
- The Hues Corporation, Freedom for the Stallion (RCA Victor, 1973)
- Bobby Hutcherson, Montara (Blue Note, 1975)
- Irene Kral, Wonderful Life (Mainstream, 1965)
- Michel Legrand, The Mountain Men (Intrada, 2012)
- Lori Lieberman, A Piece of Time (Capitol, 1974)
- Julie London, Bobby Troup, In Tokyo 1964 (SSJ, 2016)
- Melissa Manchester, Don't Cry Out Loud (Arista, 1978)
- Melissa Manchester, If My Heart Had Wings (Atlantic, 1995)
- Barry Manilow, Showstoppers (Arista, 1991)
- Barry Manilow, Manilow Sings Sinatra (Arista, 1998)
- Jeane Manson, Stand by Me (CBS, 1980)
- Johnny Mathis, How Do You Keep the Music Playing (Columbia, 1993)
- Carmen McRae, I Am Music (Blue Note, 1975)
- Carmen McRae, Can't Hide Love (Blue Note, 1976)
- Les McCann, McCann & Wilson (Pacific Jazz, 1964)
- Lonette McKee, Words and Music (Warner Bros., 1978)
- Mike Melvoin, The Plastic Cow Goes Moooooog (Dot, 1969)
- Idina Menzel, Holiday Wishes (Warner Bros., 2014)
- Ethel Merman, The Ethel Merman Disco Album (A&M, 1979)
- Bette Midler, Bathhouse Betty (Warner Bros., 1998)
- Ronnie Milsap, Just for a Thrill (Image Entertainment, 2004)
- Joni Mitchell, Court and Spark (Asylum, 1974)
- The Monkees, The Birds, the Bees & the Monkees (Colgems, 1968)
- Howdy Moon, Howdy Moon (A&M, 1974)
- Maria Muldaur, Waitress in a Donut Shop (Reprise, 1974)
- Walter Murphy, Rhapsody in Blue (Private Stock, 1977)
- Oliver Nelson, Skull Session (Flying Dutchman, 1975)
- Sammy Nestico, This Is the Moment (Fenwood Music, 2002)
- Randy Newman, Good Old Boys (Reprise, 1974)
- Juice Newton, Juice (Capitol, 1981)
- Renee Olstead, Renee Olstead (Reprise, 2004)
- Van Dyke Parks, Song Cycle (Warner Bros., 1967)
- Van Dyke Parks, Tokyo Rose (Warner Bros., 1989)
- Freda Payne, Payne & Pleasure (ABC, 1974)
- Dory Previn, Reflections in a Mud Puddle & Taps Tremors and Time Steps (United Artists, 1971)
- Boots Randolph, Boots with Brass (Monument, 1970)
- Lou Rawls, For You My Love (Capitol, 1994)
- Helen Reddy, Helen Reddy (Capitol, 1971)
- Helen Reddy, Ear Candy (Capitol, 1977)
- Della Reese, Let Me in Your Life (People, 1973)
- Emil Richards, Journey to Bliss (ABC Impulse!, 1968)
- Nelson Riddle, Contemporary Sound of Nelson Riddle (United Artists, 1968)
- Lee Ritenour, Captain Fingers (Epic, 1977)
- Arthur B. Rubinstein, Another Stakeout (Intrada, 2018)
- Pete Rugolo, This World Then the Fireworks (Varèse Sarabande, 1997)
- Arturo Sandoval, Trumpet Evolution (Columbia, 2000)
- The Sandpipers, Come Saturday Morning (A&M, 1970)
- The Sandpipers, A Gift of Song (A&M, 1971)
- Moacir Santos, Carnival of the Spirits (Blue Note, 1975)
- Diane Schuur, In Tribute (GRP, 1992)
- Tom Scott, The Honeysuckle Breeze (ABC Impulse!, 1967)
- Tom Scott, Blow It Out (Epic, 1977)
- Ravi Shankar, Improvisations (World Pacific, 1962)
- Marlena Shaw, Who Is This Bitch, Anyway? (Blue Note, 1975)
- The Singers Unlimited, Feeling Free (MPS, 1975)
- The Singers Unlimited, A Special Blend (MPS, 1976)
- Keely Smith, The Intimate Keely Smith (Reprise, 1964)
- Keely Smith, Keely Sings Sinatra (Concord, 2001)
- O. C. Smith, Together (Caribou, 1977)
- Phil Spector, Back to Mono (ABKCO, 1991)
- Luis Alberto Spinetta, Only Love Can Sustain (Columbia, 1980)
- Dusty Springfield, Living Without Your Love (United Artists, 1978)
- Ringo Starr, Stop and Smell the Roses (Boardwalk, 1981)
- Rod Stewart, It Had to Be You: The Great American Songbook (BMG, 2002)
- Stone Poneys, Evergreen, Volume 2 (Capitol, 1967)
- Billy Strange, Dynomite Guitar (GNP Crescendo, 1976)
- Barbra Streisand, Songbird (Columbia, 1978)
- Gabor Szabo, Wind, Sky and Diamonds (Impulse!, 1967)
- Bob Thiele & Gabor Szabo & Tom Scott & Bill Plummer, Light My Fire (Impulse!, 1967)
- Toots Thielemans, Yesterday & Today (A&M, 1973)
- George Tipton, Nilsson by Tipton (Warner Bros., 1970)
- Gerald Wilson, Feelin' Kinda Blues (Pacific, 1965)
- Brian Wilson & Van Dyke Parks, Orange Crate Art (Omnivore, 1995)
- The Wilsons, The Wilsons (Polygram, 1997)
- Bill Withers, Making Music (CBS, 1975)
- Lee Ann Womack, The Season for Romance (MCA, 2002)
- Frank Zappa, Lumpy Gravy (Verve, 1967)
