= Batucada (Walter Wanderley album) =

Studio album by Walter Wanderley
- Released: 1967
- Recorded: May 16, 1967–June 25, 1967
- Studios: Western Recorders, Hollywood, CA
- Genres: Bossa nova; batucada
- Length: 36:42
- Label: Verve
- Producer: Creed Taylor

Walter Wanderley chronology
Organ-ized (1967)	Batucada (1967)	Popcorn (1967)

Singles from Batucada
- 1. "On the South Side of Chicago" / "Minha Saudade" Released: 1967

Batucada is a 1967 album by Brazilian musician Walter Wanderley. Batucada refers to a fast and repetitive style of samba music played with percussion instruments and is used as an intro on the third track, "Batucada."

== Critical reception ==
John Bush of AllMusic described Wanderley's organ sound as "veer[ing] close to the edge where cool jazz becomes easy listening," but said that "fans of Wanderley's work on Astrud Gilberto's A Certain Smile, A Certain Sadness will enjoy this as background music."

Professional ratings
Review scores
Source	Rating
AllMusic	3/5 stars

== Use in media ==
The song "Os Grilos (The Crickets Sing for Anamaria)" was used in an episode of Breaking Bad titled "Hermanos."

== Track listing ==
Side one
No.	Title	Length
1.	"On the South Side of Chicago"	2:41
2.	"O Barquinho"	3:03
3.	"Batucada"	2:09
4.	"It Hurts to Say Goodbye"	2:10
5.	"Os Grilos (The Crickets Sing for Anamaria)"	4:27
6.	"Minha Saudade"	2:46

Side two
No.	Title	Length
1.	"É Preciso Cantar"	3:33
2.	"So What's New?"	3:10
3.	"Wave"	3:16
4.	"Ainda Mais Lindo (More Beautiful)"	3:20
5.	"Ela E Carioca (She's a Carioca)"	3:30
6.	"Jequibau (Pretty Butterfly)"	2:37

== Personnel ==
- Walter Wanderley – organ, piano
- Jose Marino, Sebastian Neto – bass
- Acy R. Lehman – cover design
- Irv Elkin – cover photo
- Val Valentin – Engineering Director
- Dom Um Romao, Paulinho – Drums
- Lee Herschberg, Rudy Hill – Recording Engineer
- Marcos Valle – Guitar
- Marcos Valle (tracks: side one - 3, 5; side two - 1, 4,), Walter Wanderley (tracks: side one - 2; side two - 2, 3, 5, 6) – Mixer, Arranger
- Lu Lu Ferreira – Percussion
- Creed Taylor – Producer
- Claudio Miranda (tracks: side two - 5), Talya Ferro (tracks: side two - 3, 5) – Vocals
