= Claudio Slon =

Brazilian musician

- Born: November 12, 1943; Buenos Aires, Argentina
- Died: April 16, 2002 (aged 58) Denver, Colorado, United States
- Genres: Jazz
- Occupation: Drummer

Claudio Slon (November 12, 1943 - April 16, 2002) was a notable Brazilian jazz drummer born in Buenos Aires, Argentina. He performed in a variety of Latin music genres, including Latin pop, Latin jazz, Brazilian pop and easy pop.

The son of a classical violinist and a ballet instructor, Slon was raised in São Paulo and began recording professionally at an early age, taking first place in a national poll of jazz critics while still a teenager. He performed alongside his father in the São Paulo Philharmonic, before appearing with the Walter Wanderley Trio, as well as Sérgio Mendes' Brasil '66 and Brasil '77 during the 1960s and 1970s.

He also appeared on many Brazilian sessions overseen by Creed Taylor for the Verve label, including A Certain Smile, A Certain Sadness by Astrud Gilberto and the Walter Wanderley Trio, Wave by Antônio Carlos Jobim, and Samba '68 by Marcos Valle. Although a total of three drummers are generally credited on the Jobim Wave release and reissues, it is Slon who is playing the drum set; Bobby Rosengarden and Dom Um Romao play only percussion on the record.

The success of the Wanderley Trio's Top Five single "Summer Samba" and platinum debut album Rain Forest brought recording work of all kinds for Slon during the period, including a high-profile gig with Jobim and Frank Sinatra on the album Sinatra & Company and its accompanying television special A Man and His Music + Ella + Jobim. He joined Sérgio Mendes & Brasil '66 by the end of the decade. Slon appeared with the group for a total of nine years, and also played and recorded albums with Dori Caymmi, Paulinho da Costa, John Pisano, Oscar Feldman and Joe Pass, among others. Slon also co-led (with Milcho Leviev) the Leviev-Slon Quartet, releasing albums for Vartan Jazz (Jive Sambas, among others) and then for Elephant Records (“When I'm 64”), the latter recorded with Herbie Mann. The last trio of which he was the drummer was the newly formed Joao Donato Trio in 1999, where that group recorded three albums on Elephant. In addition to being a top-notch drummer, Claudio was also an excellent Brazilian percussionist and recorded as such on several albums.

Slon was based in Los Angeles for many years before relocating in the mid-1990s to Colorado where he continued to work as a drummer, percussionist and producer until his death from lung cancer in Denver, Colorado, in April, 2002.

== See also ==
- Mário Negrão
