= Samba do Avião =

1962 song by Antônio Carlos Jobim

"Samba do Avião" (lit. 'Airplane Samba'), also known as "Song of the Jet", is a Brazilian song composed in 1962 by Antônio Carlos Jobim, who also wrote the original Portuguese lyrics. The English-language lyrics are by Gene Lees.

In the biography Antonio Carlos Jobim: An Illuminated Man, Helena Jobim describes how her brother came up with the idea for the song: "Tom's many walks from Ipanema to Santos Dumont Airport yielded that ode of beauty... He would head towards the airport, following the water's edge around Guanabara's Bay. The pretext to go there was to buy foreign magazines and newspapers. From Santos Dumont Airport he could observe his passion, the airplane. Yet he still kept some distance from those machines. He was afraid of flying, but he loved their power, splendor, and aerodynamics—man's conquest over machine".

In the song, Jobim writes about landing at "Galeão" in Rio de Janeiro. The airport was renamed in his honor in 1999 and is now called Rio de Janeiro–Antonio Carlos Jobim International Airport.

Jobim wrote "Samba do Avião" for an Italian film, Copacabana Palace (1962), where it was performed by Jula De Palma and I 4 + 4 di Nora Orlandi. The movie was filmed in Rio and features cameo appearances by Jobim, João Gilberto and Os Cariocas.

The first performance of the song was by Jobim and Os Cariocas in August 1962 at the Au Bon Gourmet restaurant in Copacabana, Rio, at what music historian Ruy Castro calls "the bossa nova show to end all bossa nova shows", as it featured Jobim, João Gilberto, Vinícius de Moraes and Os Cariocas on stage together for the only time.

The first recording of the song was released in October 1962 by Elza Laranjeira. Os Cariocas had a hit with their rendition in 1963. The first English-language version was by Tony Bennett for his 1965 album If I Ruled the World: Songs for the Jet Set.

An instrumental version of this song was featured during a segment of the 2016 Summer Olympics opening ceremony at the Maracanã Stadium in Rio de Janeiro. In the scene, an actor portraying the Brazilian inventor Santos Dumont exits the stadium aboard a replica of the 14-bis aircraft and flies over the night sky of Rio de Janeiro, with the song playing in the background.

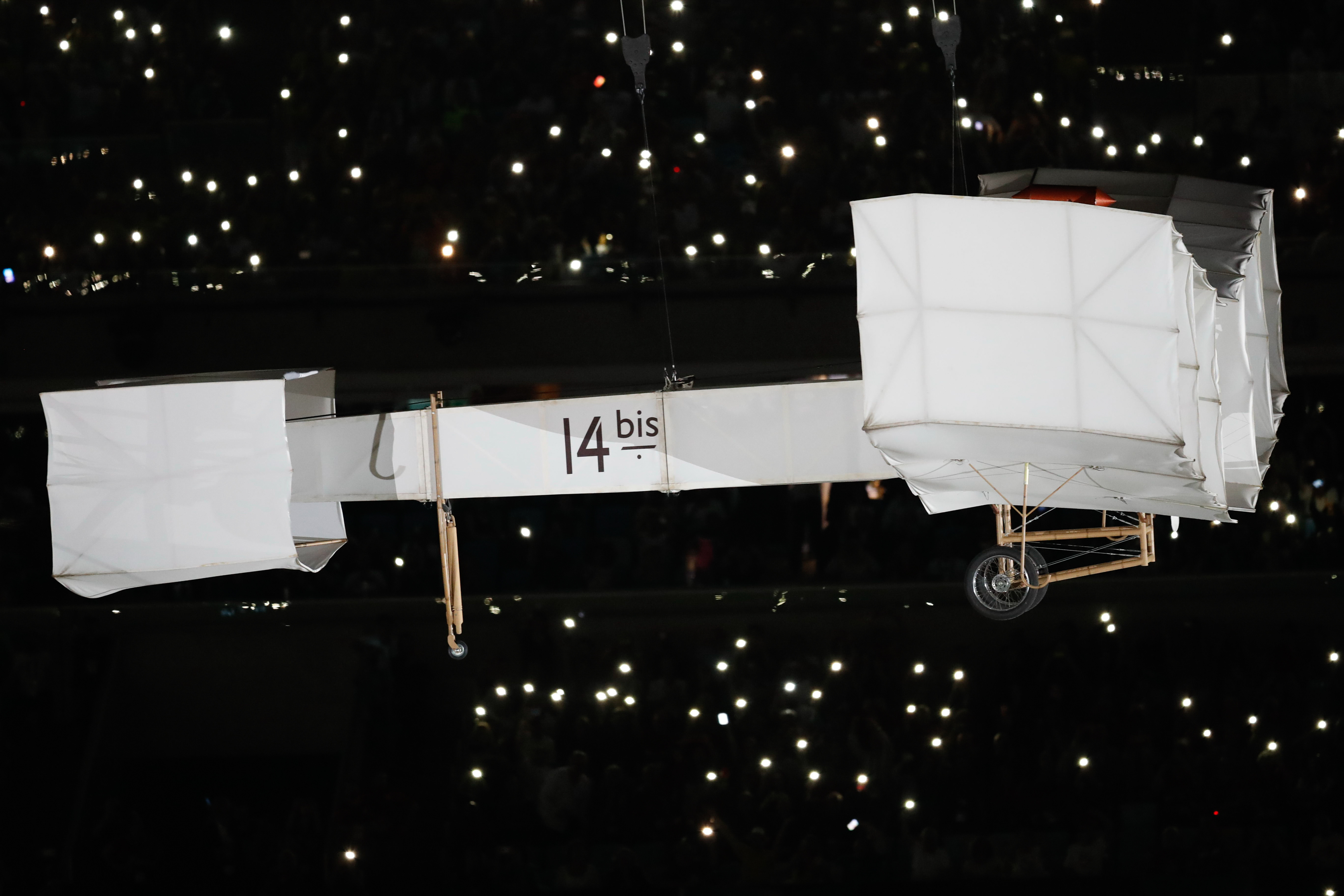

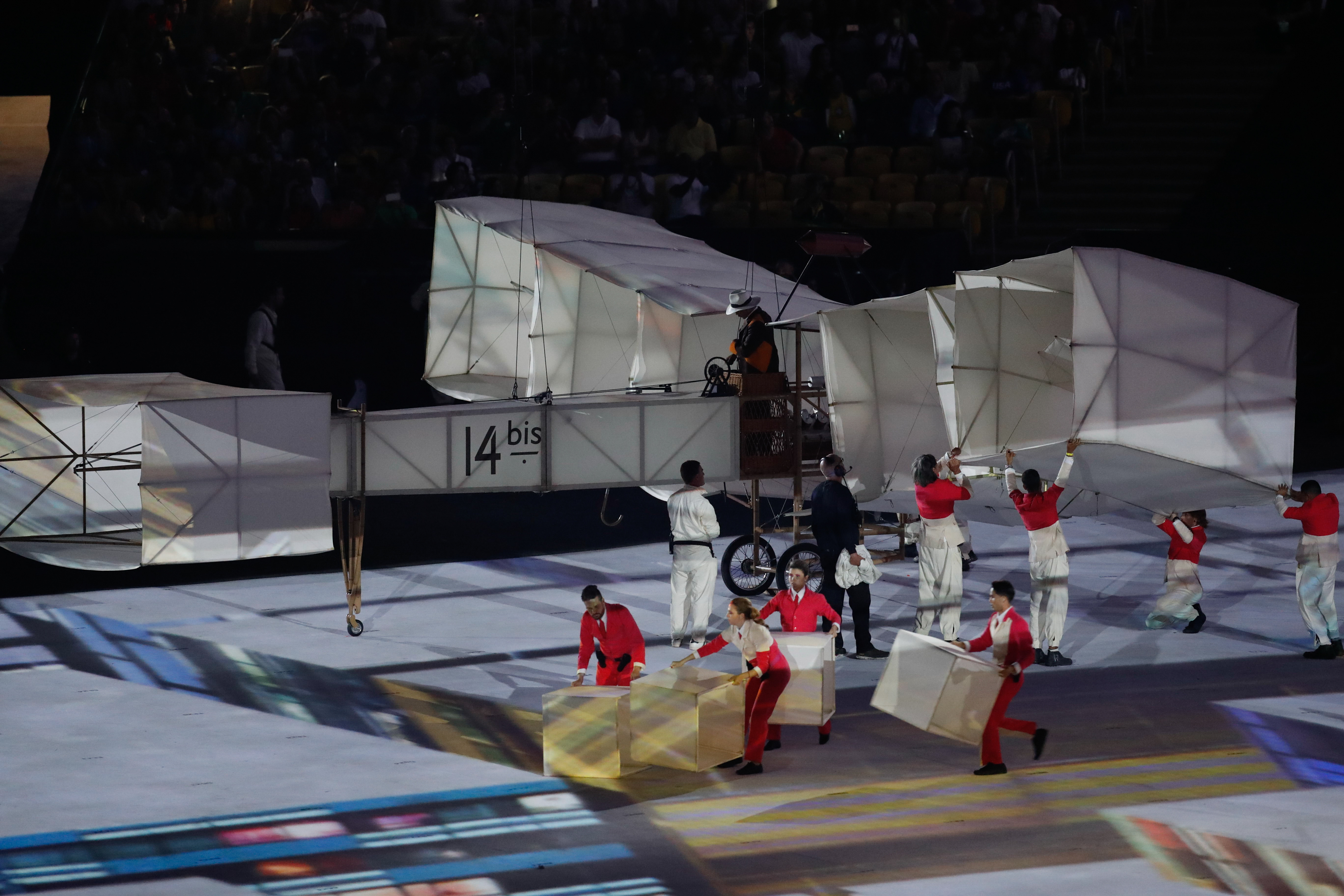

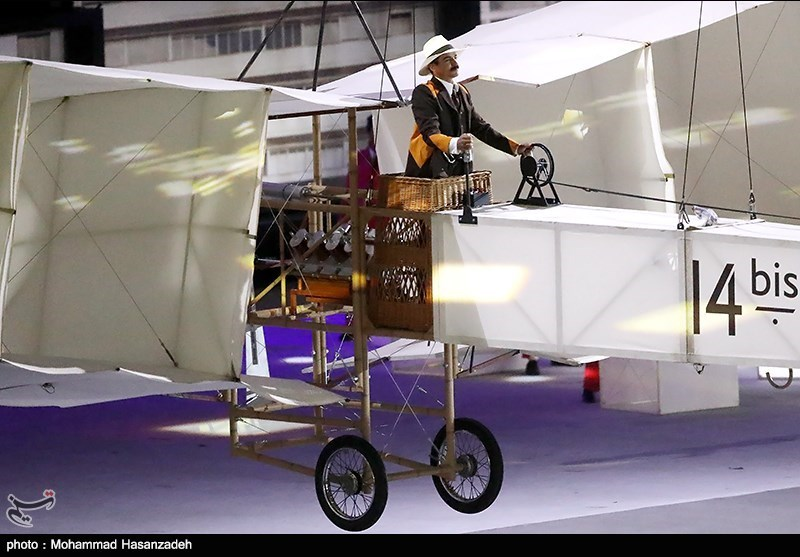

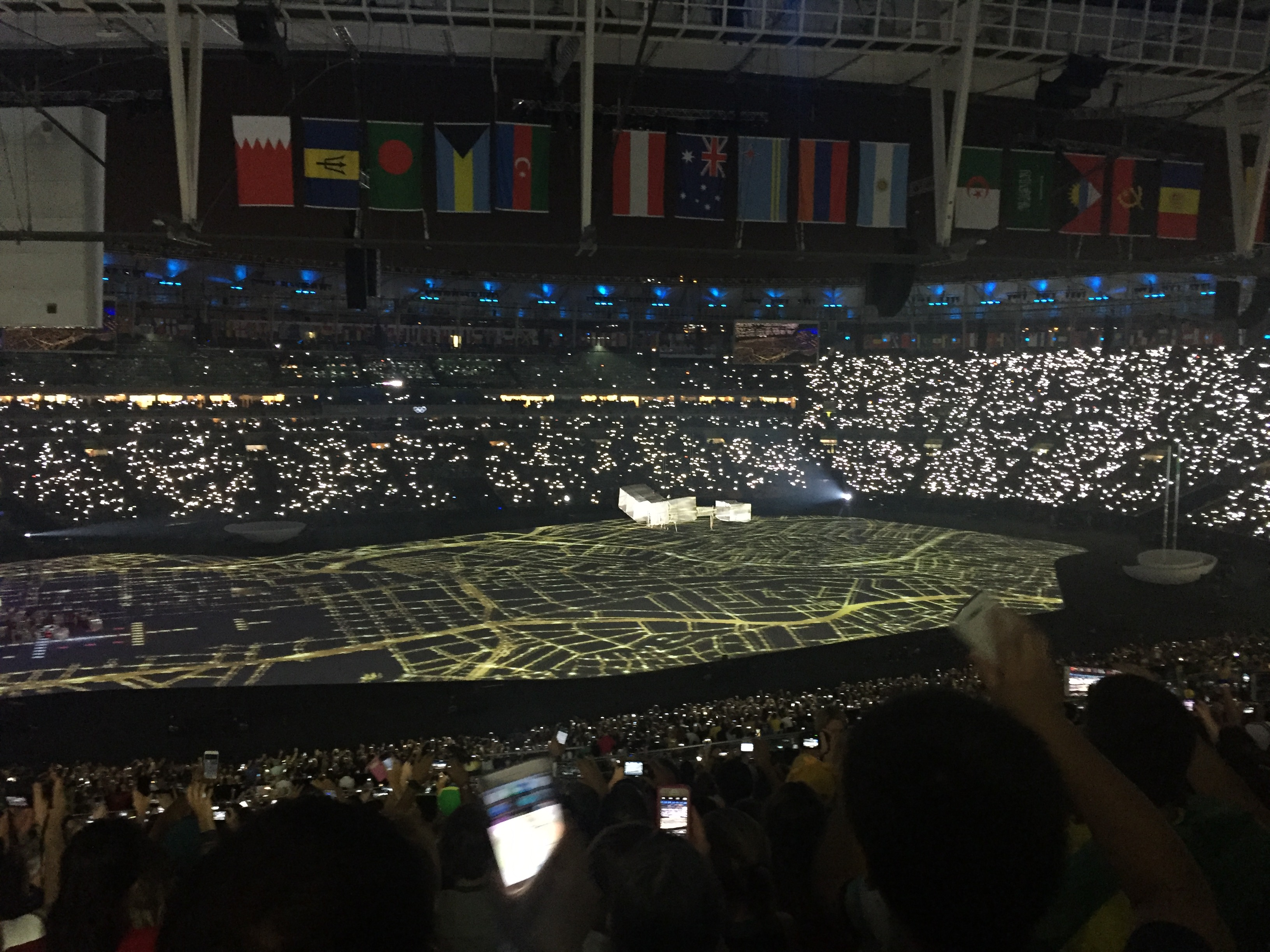
Santos Dumont flying the 14-bis aircraft at the 2016 Summer Olympics opening ceremony

== Recorded versions ==
- Elza Laranjeira (October 1962)
- Os Cariocas – A Bossa dos Cariocas (1963)
- Sylvia Telles – Bossa, Balanço, Balada (1963)
- Eumir Deodato – Inútil Paisagem – As Maiores Composições de Antonio Carlos Jobim (1964)
- Paul Winter, w/ Luiz Bonfá, Roberto Menescal & Luiz Eça – Rio (1964) – as "Avion (Song of the Jet)"
- Tony Bennett – If I Ruled the World: Songs for the Jet Set (1965)
- Charlie Byrd – Brazilian Byrd (1965)
- Antônio Carlos Jobim – The Wonderful World of Antonio Carlos Jobim (1965)
- Bud Shank, with João Donato – Bud Shank & His Brazilian Friends (1965)
- Walter Wanderley – Rain Forest (1966)
- Dick Hyman – Brazilian Impressions (1967)
- Stanley Turrentine – A Bluish Bag (rec. 1967, released 2007)
- Gilberto Gil – Refavela (1977)
- Miúcha & Antônio Carlos Jobim – Miúcha & Antonio Carlos Jobim (1977)
- Ella Fitzgerald – Ella Abraça Jobim (1981)– Released on the original LP but left off the 1991 CD version
- Os Mulheres Negras – Música e Ciência (1988)
- Baden Powell – Live in Hamburg (rec. 1983, released 1995)
- Eliane Elias – Paulistana (1993) – As "Jet Samba (Samba do Avião)"
- Danilo Caymmi – Sol Moreno (1995)
- Eliane Elias – Eliane Elias Sings Jobim (1998) and Brazilian Classics (2003)
- Gal Costa – Gal Costa Canta Tom Jobim ao Vivo (1999)
- Jaques Morelenbaum, Paula Morelenbaum and Ryuichi Sakamoto – Morelenbaum 2/Sakamoto: A Day in New York (2003)
- Roseanna Vitro – Tropical Postcards (2004)
- Toquinho – Tributo à Bossa Nova (2005)
- Milton Nascimento – Novas Bossas (2008)
- Lisa Ono and Miúcha - The Music of Antônio Carlos Jobim "Ipanema" (2007)
