= A Certain Smile, a Certain Sadness =

A Certain Smile, A Certain Sadness

Studio album by Astrud Gilberto
- Released: 1967
- Recorded: 20–23 September 1966, New York
- Genre: Bossa nova
- Length: 29:47
- Label: Verve
- Producer: Creed Taylor

Astrud Gilberto chronology
Look to the Rainbow (1967)	A Certain Smile, A Certain Sadness (1967)	Beach Samba (1968)

Walter Wanderley chronology
Rain Forest (1966)	A Certain Smile, a Certain Sadness (1967)	Cheganca (1967)

Professional ratings
Review scores
Source	Rating
Allmusic	3.5/5 stars
DownBeat	3/5 stars

A Certain Smile, A Certain Sadness is an album by Astrud Gilberto and Walter Wanderley, recorded in September 1966.

It was released by Verve Records at the height of the Bossa Nova craze in the United States, and featured the two most popular Bossa Nova musicians at the time: vocalist Astrud Gilberto and organist Walter Wanderley. A 1998 CD reissue added two songs recorded during the same sessions that yielded the album.

== Track listing ==
No.	Title	Writer(s)	Length
1.	"A Certain Smile"	Sammy Fain, Paul Webster	1:27
2.	"A Certain Sadness"	Carlos Eduardo Lyra, John Court	3:08
3.	"Nega do Cabelo Duro"	Reubens Soares, David Nasser	2:18
4.	"So Nice (Summer Samba)"	Marcos Valle, Paulo Valle, Norman Gimbel	2:41
5.	"Você Já Foi à Bahia"	Dorival Caymmi	2:15
6.	"Portuguese Washerwoman"	André Popp, Roger Antoine Lucchesi	1:30
7.	"Goodbye Sadness (Tristeza)"	Haroldo Lobo, Niltinho, Norman Gimbel	3:33
8.	"Call Me"	Tony Hatch	3:20
9.	"Here's That Rainy Day"	Jimmy Van Heusen, Johnny Burke	2:43
10.	"Tu Mi Delirio"	César Portillo de la Luz	3:38
11.	"It's a Lovely Day Today"	Irving Berlin	2:39
12.	"The Sadness of After" (CD bonus track)	Edu Lobo, Norman Gimbel	2:27
13.	"Who Needs Forever?" (CD bonus track)	Quincy Delight Jones, Jr., Howard Greenfield	2:48

== Personnel ==
- Astrud Gilberto – vocals
- Walter Wanderley – organ
- José Marino – bass
- Claudio Slon – drums
- Bobby Rosengarden – percussion

Technical

- Creed Taylor – producer
- Chuck Stewart – cover photograph

Also, João Gilberto (or possibly Marcos Valle) may have played guitar on tracks 2, 7, and 13.
