= Música Serve pra Isso =

Studio album by Os Mulheres Negras
- Released: 1990
- Genre: Experimental rock, art rock, pop rock, synthpop, synthrock, indie rock, indie pop, world music
- Length: 42:32
- Label: WEA
- Producer: Os Mulheres Negras

Os Mulheres Negras chronology
Música e Ciência (1988)	Música Serve pra Isso (1990)

Música Serve pra Isso (Portuguese for "Music Was Made for This") is the second and currently last studio album by Brazilian experimental rock duo Os Mulheres Negras, released in 1990 by WEA. Unlike its predecessor Música e Ciência it follows a slightly less experimental direction influenced by traditional Brazilian and African music (as visible in the tracks "Guembô", "Martim" and "Só Quero um Xodó", a cover of singer Dominguinhos). It was re-issued in CD format in 2001 alongside Música e Ciência.

The duo broke up one year after the album's release, and endured a 21-year hiatus before reuniting in 2012.

One of the duo's components, Maurício Pereira, covered "Música Serve pra Isso" and "Imbarueri" for his second solo album, Mergulhar na Surpresa, released in 1998.

== Track listing ==
All tracks are written by Os Mulheres Negras (André Abujamra and Maurício Pereira), except for "Martim", a traditional Brazilian song, and "Só Quero um Xodó" by Dominguinhos and Anastácia

No.	Title	English title	Length
1.	"Música Serve pra Isso"	Music Was Made for This	3:29
2.	"Martim"		3:32
3.	"Guembô"		1:36
4.	"Só Tetele"	Just Tetele	4:05
5.	"John"		3:04
6.	"Só Quero um Xodó"	I Just Want a Sweetheart	3:32
7.	"Cabeludas"	Hairy	2:37
8.	"Etiópia-Mirim" (instrumental)	Little Ethiopia	1:50
9.	"Imbarueri"		4:20
10.	"Judith"		3:13
11.	"A Lavadeira, o Varal e a Saudade" (instrumental)	The Laundress, the Clothesline and the Saudade	2:41
12.	"Monstros Japoneses"	Japanese Monsters	2:54
13.	"Common Uncommunicability"		5:39

== Personnel ==
- André Abujamra – vocals, electric guitar, synthesizer, drum machine, production
- Maurício Pereira – vocals, saxophone, production
- Artur Maia – bass (tracks 4 and 10)
- Kuki Stolarski – drums (track 9)
- Théo Werneck – backing vocals (track 9)
