= The Carnival (band) =

American pop group (1969–1970)

The Carnival in 1968. Clockwise from bottom left: Terry Fischer, Tommy Neal, José Soares, and Janis Hansen.

The Carnival was an American pop group formed by percussionist José Soares and vocalist Janis Hansen, both formerly of Sergio Mendes' Brasil '66. Initially a joint venture between Walter Wanderley and the original members of Brasil '66, the group eventually settled into a quartet augmented by Terry Fischer of The Murmaids and bassist Tommy Neal.

The quartet's Brasil '66-meets-5th Dimension sound was largely the brainchild of producer-engineer Bones Howe, who gathered L.A.'s Wrecking Crew studio musicians like Hal Blaine and Larry Knechtel for the project.

A self-titled album was released in 1969. Two singles, "Son of a Preacher Man" b/w "Walk On By" and "Laia Ladaia" b/w "Canto de Carnival", were issued to promote what was supposed to be their debut album. Despite Howe's name attached to the project, public reaction was minimal and plans for a follow-up record were scrapped. A single culled from the aborted sessions, "Where There's a Heartache (There Must Be a Heart)" b/w "The Truth About It", was put out in December 1970; however, The Carnival had already dissolved by then.

Soares returned to Brazil, where not much has been heard about him since. Hansen left the mainstream music industry, married a lawyer in 1970, raised a family, at one point working as a state employee, but later focused on producing and writing. Neal went to become a more active member of his local congregation. Fischer reinvented herself as a jazz singer, having toured with Frank Sinatra being among her notable credentials. She briefly relaunched The Murmaids with her sister and recorded a reunion album in 2002.

Fischer and Hansen both died in 2017, seven months apart from each other.

== LPs / CDs ==
=== Album ===
- The Carnival (World Pacific Records WPS-21894, 1969, No. 191 US):

==== Side One ====
- "Canto de Carnival" (The Carnival)
- "Laia Ladaia" (Edu Lobo/Ruy Guerra/Norman Gimbel)
- "Sweets for My Sweet" (Doc Pomus/Mort Shuman)
- "Take Me for a Little While" (Trade Martin)
- "Turn, Turn, Turn (To Everything There Is a Season)" (Pete Seeger)
- "Hope" (Louis Aldebert/Monique Aldebert)
- "Walk On By" (Burt Bacharach/Hal David)

==== Side Two ====
- "One Bright Night (A Famous Myth)" (Jeffrey Camanor)
- "Son of a Preacher Man" (John Hurley/Ronnie Wilkins)
- "Reach Out for Me" (Bacharach/David)
- "Love So Fine" (Roger Nichols/Tony Asher)
- "The Word" (John Lennon/Paul McCartney)

The LP was re-released as a CD in 2004 by Rev-Ola Records, containing the following additional tracks:

- "Where There's a Heartache" (There Must Be a Heart) (Bacharach/David)
- "The Truth About It" (Cheryl Ernst (Wells) music and lyrics)
- "Son of a Preacher Man" (mono, as the original single release)

=== Personnel ===
- Bill Holman, Bob Alcivar, and The Carnival – arrangements
- Pete Jolly – electric piano
- Jimmy Rowles – piano
- others
