= Reach Out (Burt Bacharach album) =

Studio album by Burt Bacharach
- Released: 1967
- Genre: Easy listening
- Label: A&M (US); DJM (UK)
- Producer: Burt Bacharach

Burt Bacharach chronology
After the Fox (1966)	Reach Out (1967)	Casino Royale (1967)

Reach Out is a studio album by the American composer Burt Bacharach, released in 1967.

It was his first charting album, peaking at No. 96 on the Billboard Top LPs during a sixty five-week stay on the chart.

== Track listing ==
All lyrics by Hal David and all music by Burt Bacharach.

Side one

1. "Reach Out for Me" – 2:50
2. "Alfie" – 2:58
3. "Bond Street" (Instrumental) – 2:02
4. "Are You There (With Another Girl)" – 2:50
5. "What the World Needs Now Is Love" – 4:00

Side two

1. "The Look of Love" – 2:31
2. "A House Is Not a Home" – 3:45
3. "I Say a Little Prayer" – 2:24
4. "The Windows of the World" – 2:30
5. "Lisa" – 3:38
6. "Message to Michael" – 3:20

== Personnel ==
- Burt Bacharach - vocals, arrangements, conductor

Technical

- Henry Lewy - engineer (tracks A4, A5, B3, B4)
- Phil Ramone - engineer (tracks A1 to A3, B1, B2, B5, B6)
- Jim McCrary - photographer

== Charts ==
Chart (1967)	Peak position
US Billboard Top LPs	96
