= Luiz Henrique Rosa =

Luiz Henrique
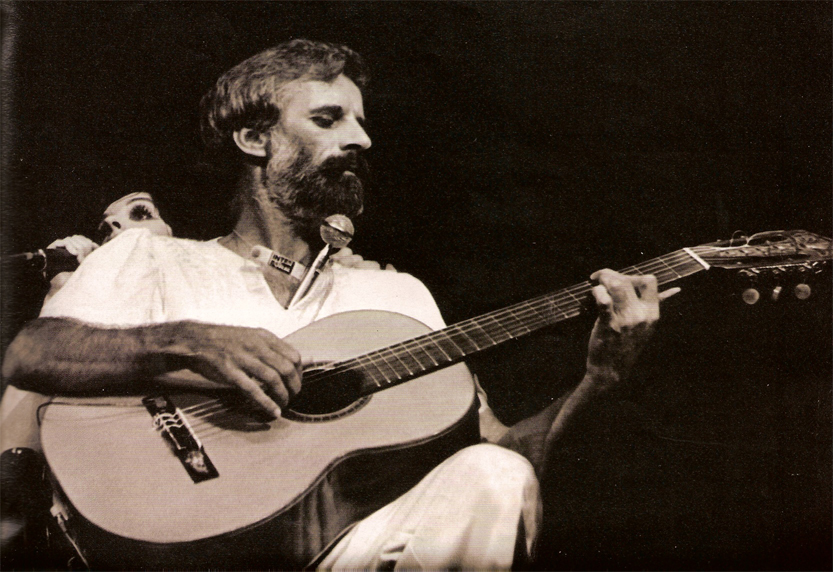
- Luiz Henrique Rosa in Rio de Janeiro, 1979. Liza Minnelli is partially visible behind him.

Background information
- Born: November 25, 1938; Tubarão, Brazil
- Died: July 9, 1985 (aged 46) Florianópolis, Brazil
- Occupation: Musician
- Instrument: Guitar
- Label: Verve Records

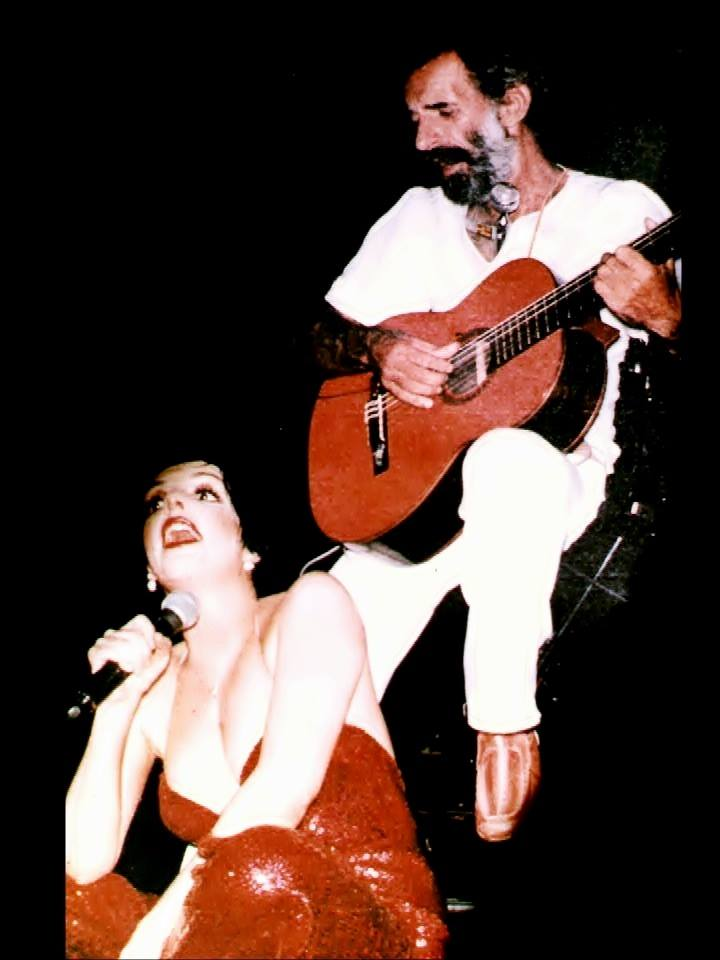
Liza Minnelli and Rosa, Rio de Janeiro, 1979

Luiz Henrique (November 25, 1938 – July 9, 1985), also known as Luiz Henrique Rosa, was a Brazilian musician. He was born in the city of Tubarão and died in Florianópolis.

In 1963 luiz Henrique recorded his first LP: “A Bossa Moderna de Luiz Henrique" and reached the top of the charts all over the country with songs like: ”Sambou, sambou”, “No balanço do mar” and “Vou andar por aí”. In 1965, while the Bossa Nova fever lived its prime in Brazil, Luiz Henrique went to the United States, following the trend of his time. In New York he met and worked with several great names of the American music scene such as Stan Getz, Oscar Brown Jr., Billy Butterfield and Bobby Hacket and also with lots of Brazilian musicians like Sivuca, Hermeto Pascoal, Walter Wanderley, João Gilberto, Airton Moreira. with them Luiz Henrique composed and recorded many musics, in many LP's. Also during this period that he met the actress and singer Liza Minnelli. The strong friendship they had brought the star to Florianópolis in the carnival of 1979, invited by Luiz Henrique. The musician remained in the US until December 1971, when he returned to his beloved island (Florianópolis). In 1976 he released his last LP: “Mestiço”, with tracks recorded in Rio de Janeiro and in Hollywood. On the 9th of July 1985, the year he would complete 25 years of career, Luiz Henrique died at the age of 46, in a brutal car accident in Florianópolis.

== Discography ==
- 1961 : Garota da Rua da Praia
- 1963 : A Bossa Moderna de Luiz Henrique
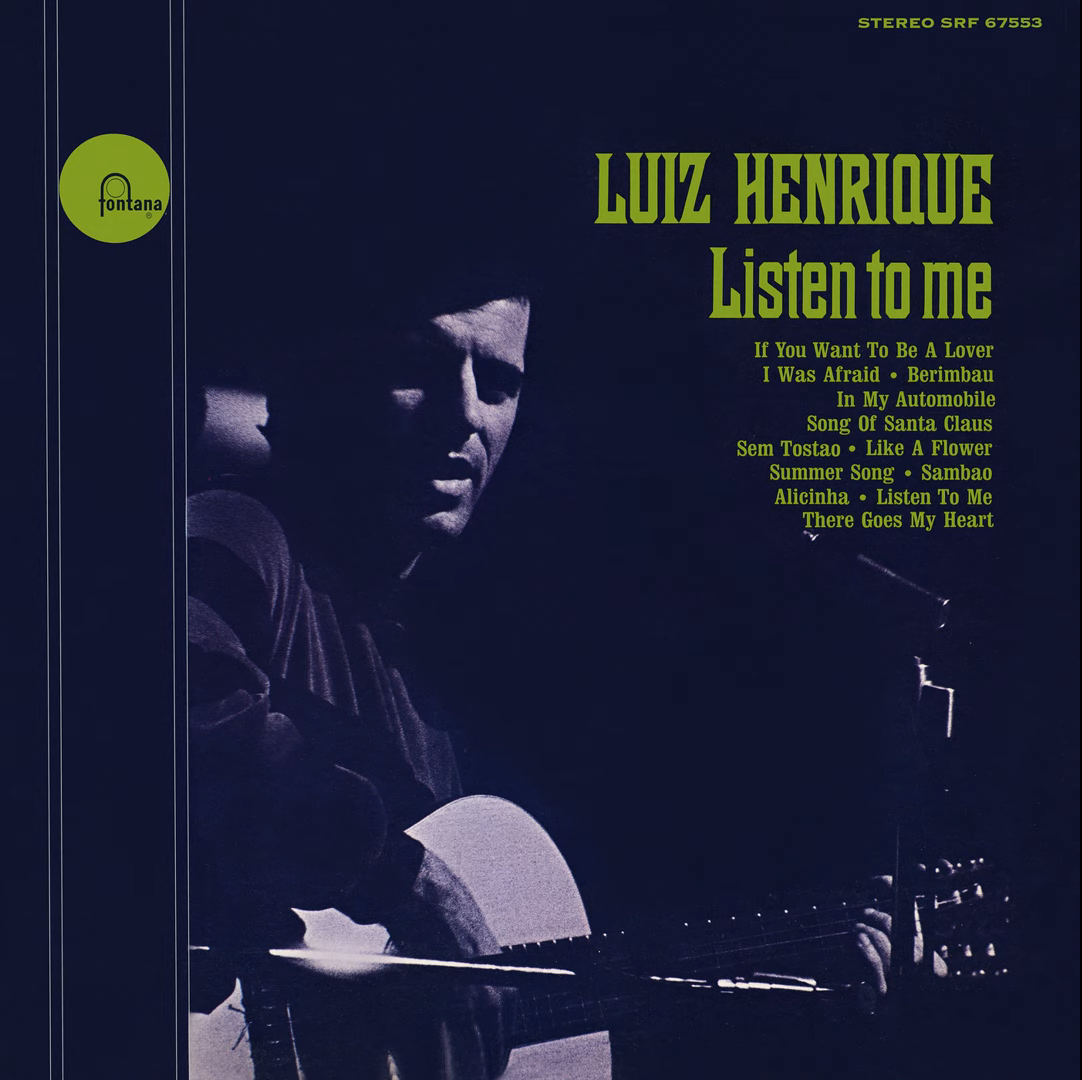
- Listen to Me by Luiz Henrique, originally released in 1967 by Fontana
  1967 : Barra Limpa (Verve Records)
- 1967 : Popcorn
- 1967 : Bobby, Billy & Brazil (Verve)
- 1968 : Finding a New Friend (with Oscar Brown Jr.)
- 1968 : Listen to Me
- 1968 : Joy 66
- 1968 : The Electric Experiment is Over (Noel Harrison)
- 1975 : Mestiço
