= Janis Hansen =

Janis Hansen may refer to:

- Janis Hansen (manager) (1940–2021), American talent agent and actress
- Janis Hansen (singer) (1942–2017), American singer, producer and writer
