= Música e Ciência =

Studio album by Os Mulheres Negras
- Released: 1988
- Recorded: 1987
- Studio: Estúdio Vice-Versa
- Genre: Experimental rock, comedy rock, art rock, pop rock, synthpop, synthrock, indie rock, indie pop
- Length: 45:29
- Label: WEA
- Producer: Pena Schmidt, Paulo Calasans

Os Mulheres Negras chronology
Música e Ciência (1988)	Música Serve pra Isso (1990)

Música e Ciência (Portuguese for "Music and Science") is the debut album by Brazilian experimental rock duo Os Mulheres Negras, released in 1988 by WEA (present-day Warner Music Group). Produced by Pena Schmidt and with art direction by Liminha, the album was lauded for its experimentation and eclecticism, flirting with distinct stylistic influences such as The Beatles, Henry Mancini, George Gershwin and Tom Jobim, and garnered a strong cult following; nevertheless, it was a commercial failure, leading Schmidt to remark that "Brazil isn't ready for Os Mulheres Negras".

"Sub" is a Portuguese-language version of The Beatles' "Yellow Submarine". Also covered on the album are George Gershwin's "Summertime", Henry Mancini's "Peter Gunn" and Tom Jobim's "Samba do Avião".

A music video was made for the track "Eu Vi".

The album was re-issued in CD form by Warner Music Group in 2001 with a bonus track; a remixed version of "Sub". Both the vinyl and CD versions are currently out of print.

== Track listing ==
All tracks are written by Os Mulheres Negras (André Abujamra and Maurício Pereira), except for "Orelhão" by Os Mulheres Negras and André Coruja; "Summertime" by George Gershwin; "Peter Gunn" by Henry Mancini; "Eu Vi" by Os Mulheres Negras and Agnaldo Valente Rocca; and "Samba do Avião" by Tom Jobim.

No.	Title	English title	Length
1.	"Orelhão"	Payphone	2:35
2.	"Método^{[A]}"	Method	0:49
3.	"Sub"		4:07
4.	"Summertime" (instrumental)		5:00
5.	"Feridas (Juntos ou Não, Felizes Junto)"	Wounds (Together or Not, Happy Together)	3:00
6.	"3 Músicas Coladas" I. "Documentário Alemão" II. "Peter Gunn" III. "Todas as Músicas do Mundo"	3 Songs Combined; I. German Documentary; II. Peter Gunn; III. All the Songs in the World	3:04
7.	"Purquá Mecê?^{[B]}"		4:39
8.	"Eu Vi"	I Saw It	3:28
9.	"19:30" (instrumental)		1:41
10.	"Elza"		0:54
11.	"Milho"	Corn	2:57
12.	"Gambá"	Skunk	0:46
13.	"Lobos para Crianças"	Lobos for Children	3:30
14.	"Samba do Avião"	Airplane Samba	0:35
15.	"Mãoscolorida" (instrumental)	Handscolored	3:50
16.	"Xarope, a Levada"	Buzzkill, the Catch	4:34

2001 CD re-issue bonus track
No.	Title	Length
17.	"Sub (Remix)"	5:59

== Notes ==
- A. As per the album's liner notes, the song's full title is "Método Os Mulheres Negras para o Ensino do Skate na Escola Pública do Primeiro Grau no Terceiro Mundo" ("Os Mulheres Negras Method for Teaching Skateboarding in First-Degree Public Schools of the Third World")
- B. Corruption of the French-language phrase "Pourquoi, monsieur?" ("Why, sir?")

== Personnel ==
- André Abujamra – vocals, electric guitar, synthesizer, drum machine
- Maurício Pereira – vocals, saxophone
- Pena Schmidt, Paulo Calasans – production
- Liminha – art direction
- Cacá Lima – engineering
- Gal Oppido – photography
