= Bobby Rosengarden =

American jazz drummer & bandleader (1924–2007)

- Born: Robert Marshall Rosengarden; April 23, 1924; Elgin, Illinois, U.S.
- Died: February 27, 2007 (aged 82) Sarasota, Florida, U.S.
- Genres: Jazz, swing, big band
- Occupation: Musician
- Instruments: Drums, percussion

Robert Marshall Rosengarden (April 23, 1924 – February 27, 2007) was an American jazz drummer, percussionist and bandleader. A native of Elgin, Illinois, United States, he played on many recordings and in television orchestras and talk show bands.

Rosengarden began playing drums when he was 12, and later studied at the University of Michigan. After playing drums in Army bands in World War II, he moved to New York City, working in several groups between 1945 and 1948, before becoming a busy studio musician. He played at NBC-TV (1949–1968) and ABC (1969–1974) on The Steve Allen Show, The Ernie Kovacs Show, Sing Along With Mitch, Johnny Carson's The Tonight Show Band, and led the band for The Dick Cavett Show.

Through the years, Rosengarden was an active studio musician, recording with Duke Ellington, Billie Holiday, Skitch Henderson, Quincy Jones, Peter Nero, Gil Evans, Miles Davis, Gerry Mulligan, Benny Goodman, Moondog, Dick Hyman, Arlo Guthrie, Carmen McRae, Ben E. King, Harry Belafonte, Barbra Streisand, Jimi Hendrix, Antonio Carlos Jobim, Walter Wanderley and Tony Bennett.

In later years, Rosengarden was most often heard as the drummer with a variety of all-star, swing-oriented groups, including Soprano Summit. He died of Alzheimer's disease in Sarasota, Florida, at the age of 82.

== Personal life ==
Robert "Bobby" Rosengarden was first married to Dorothy Kline and later remarried to Sharon Lee Rosier in 1985. Bobby is the father to two sons, Neil and Mark Rosengarden, who were raised in the village of Kings Point in Great Neck, New York. Rosengarden has four grandchildren.

== Discography ==
=== As sideman ===
With The Free Design

- Kites Are Fun (Project 3, 1967)

With Stan Getz

- What the World Needs Now: Stan Getz Plays Burt Bacharach and Hal David (Verve, 1968)

With J. J. Johnson

- Goodies (RCA Victor, 1965)

With Oliver Nelson

- Oliver Nelson Plays Michelle (Impulse!, 1966)
- Encyclopedia of Jazz (Verve, 1966)
- The Sound of Feeling (Verve, 1966)

With Frank Sinatra

- The World We Knew (Reprise, 1967)

With Jimmy Smith

- Hoochie Coochie Man (Verve, 1966)

With Sylvia Syms

- For Once in My Life (Prestige, 1967)

With Milt Hinton & Derek Smith

- The Trio (Chiaroscuro, 1994)

With Bob Wilber & Kenny Davern

- Summit Reunion (Chiaroscuro, 1989)
- Summit Reunion 1992 (Chiaroscuro, 1992)

With Walter Wanderley

- Rain Forest (Verve, 1966)

With Kai Winding

- More Brass (Verve, 1966)
