= Etty Fraser =

Brazilian actress (1931–2018)

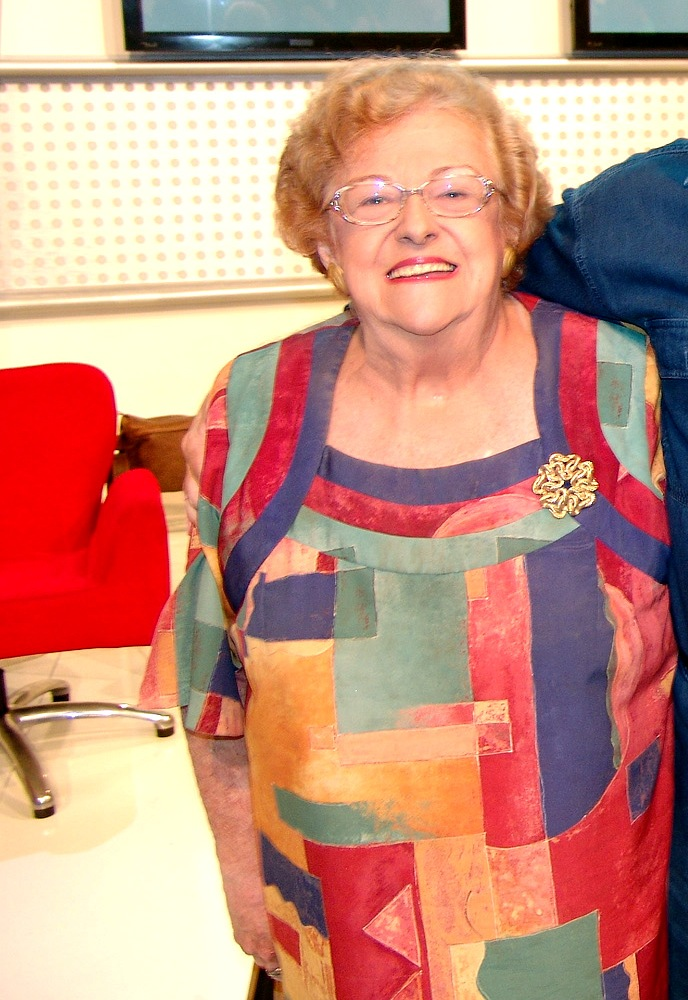
- Fraser in 2006
- Born: Etty Fraser; 8 May 1931; Rio de Janeiro, Brazil
- Died: 31 December 2018 (aged 87); São Paulo, Brazil
- Occupation: Actress
- Years active: 1959–2015
- Spouse: Chico Martins (m. 1962; died 2003)
- Children: 1

Etty Fraser Martins de Souza (8 May 1931 – 31 December 2018) was a Brazilian actress.

Predominantly a stage actress, Fraser presented a culinary program called À Moda da Casa in the 1980s on Rede Bandeirantes and later TV Record.

In 1992, Etty Fraser converted from Judaism to Roman Catholicism. She was baptized, confirmed, and married into the Roman Catholic Church.

== Works on TV ==
- 1959 - Grande Teatro Tupi
- 1961 - O Vigilante Rodoviário
- 1962 - Pequenos Burgueses
- 1966 - Ninguém Crê em Mim
- 1968 - Beto Rockfeller.... Madame Walesca
- 1969 - Nino, o Italianinho.... Adelaide
- 1970 - Simplesmente Maria.... Pierina
- 1972 - Vitória Bonelli.... Pina (Hipólita)
- 1974 - O Machão.... Mimosa
- 1975 - Meu Rico Português.... Frida
- 1976 - Os Apóstolos de Judas.... Evelyn
- 1978 - Salário Mínimo.... Letícia
- 1980 - Cavalo Amarelo.... Elisa
- 1980 - Dulcinéa vai à guerra.... Elisa
- 1987 - Sassaricando.... Felícia
- 1992 - Mundo da Lua.... Tia Yolanda
- 1998 - Torre de Babel.... Sarita
- 2001 - Entre o Amor e a Espada
- 2004 - Um Só Coração.... Ita
- 2006 - Cidadão Brasileiro.... Mariazinha
- 2010 - Uma Rosa com Amor.... Antonieta

== Works in film ==
- 1965 - São Paulo, Sociedade Anônima
- 1967 - O Alegre Mundo de Helo
- 1969 - O Agente da Lei
- 1970 - Em Cada Coração um Punhal
- 1971 - Diabólicos Herdeiros
- 1974 - Macho e Fêmea
- 1974 - O Supermanso
- 1975 - Ifigênia Dá Tudo que Tem
- 1976 - Senhora - Firmina Mascarenhas
- 1981 - O Homem do Pau-Brasil - Olívia
- 1982 - Dôra Doralina
- 1983 - O Rei da Vela
- 1992 - As Três Mães
- 1995 - A Origem dos Bebês Segundo Kiki Cavalcanti
- 2002 - Durval Discos - Carmita
- 2003 - Cristina Wants to Get Married
- 2007 - Sete Vidas - D. Bezinha
- 2009 - Por um pouco mais de liberdade - Maria
- 2011 - O Filme dos Espíritos - Dona Maria

== Awards ==
- 2002 - Cine Pernambuco - Audiovisual Festival || Best Actress || Durval Discos || || Won
- 2009 - I Shows World Largest Film || Best Supporting Actress || For A Little More Freedom || || Won
