= When It Was Done =

Studio album by Walter Wanderley Set
- Released: 1969
- Recorded: December 11, 12 & 13, 1968
- Studio: Van Gelder Studio, Englewood Cliffs, NJ
- Genre: Jazz
- Length: 31:02
- Label: A&M/CTI; SP 3018
- Producer: Creed Taylor

Walter Wanderley chronology
Kee-Ka-Roo (1967)	When It Was Done (1969)	Moondreams (1969)

When It Was Done is an album by Brazilian keyboardist Walter Wanderley featuring performances recorded in 1968 and released on the CTI label.

== Reception ==
Professional ratings
Review scores
Source	Rating
Allmusic	3/5 stars

The Allmusic by Richard S. Ginell stated "The Wanderley sound is more carefully terraced than ever on this strikingly packaged album".

== Track listing ==
1. "Open Your Arms (Let Me Walk Right In)" (Raymond B. Evans) – 2:39
2. "Surfboard" (Antônio Carlos Jobim) – 2:35
3. "Baiao Da Garoa" (Luiz Gonzaga) – 3:39
4. "Reach Out for Me" (Burt Bacharach, Hal David) – 2:41
5. "Ole, Ole, Ola" (Chico Buarque de Hollanda) – 2:30
6. "Ponteio" (Edu Lobo, José Carlos Capinam) – 2:30
7. "When It Was Done" (Jimmy Webb) – 2:24
8. "On My Mind" (Eumir Deodato, Norman Gimbel) – 2:47
9. "Just My Love and I" (Deodato, J. Spencer) – 2:21
10. "Capoeira" (Deodato) – 4:22
11. "Truth in Peace" (Durval Ferreira) – 2:34

- Recorded at Van Gelder Studio in Englewood Cliffs, New Jersey on December 11, 12 & 13, 1968

== Personnel ==
- Walter Wanderley – organ, electronic harpsichord
- Marvin Stamm, John Glasel – flugelhorn
- George Marge, Stan Webb – flute, piccolo
- Donald Ashworth, Hubert Laws – flute, piccolo, oboe, English horn
- José Marino – bass
- João Palma – drums
- Lu Lu Ferreira – percussion
- Lewis Eley, Harry Glickman, Gene Orloff, Raoul Poliakin, Max Pollikoff, Matthew Raimondi, Tosha Samaroff, Sylvan Shulman, Avram Weiss – violin
- Harold Coletta, Harold Furmansky – viola
- Charles McCracken, George Ricci – cello
- Gloria Agostini – harp
- Anamaria Valle, Marilyn Jackson, Linda November, Milton Nascimento – vocal
- Eumir Deodato – rhythm arrangements
- Don Sebesky – string arrangements
