= Summer Samba =

1964 bossa nova song

"Summer Samba" (also known as "So Nice" or its original Portuguese title, "Samba de Verão") is a 1964 bossa nova and jazz standard song by Brazilian composer Marcos Valle with Portuguese lyrics by Paulo Sérgio Valle and English-language lyrics by Norman Gimbel. Marcos Valle's recording was a top 10 hit in Rio de Janeiro that year. In the US, an instrumental recording by Walter Wanderley reached the top 40 on the pop chart and the Easy Listening top 10 in 1966. The first English vocal version was by the Sergio Mendes Trio with Wanda de Sah on vocals on the album Brasil '65. Other versions were by Vikki Carr, Connie Francis and Johnny Mathis which also made the Easy Listening chart.

== Background ==
In a 2017 interview, Marcos Valle described his life at the time of writing the song.

When I wrote "Samba de Verão" in 1964 with my brother, Paulo, I was 21, almost 22. We wrote it in our bedroom at our parents' house in Rio. What I was listening to at that time was a lot of bossa nova. That meant a lot of Antonio Carlos Jobim, Roberto Menescal and Carlos Lyra …. "Samba de Verão" reflects a lot of the atmosphere we had in Rio at the time. We lived close to the beach, and my brother and I were surfers. So the feeling of surfing, the girls—all of that—is part of our romantic portrait of Rio in that song.

The Marcos Valle recording of "Samba de Verão" got as high as number 9 on the pop chart in Rio de Janeiro in 1964.

== Walter Wanderley version ==
"Summer Samba"
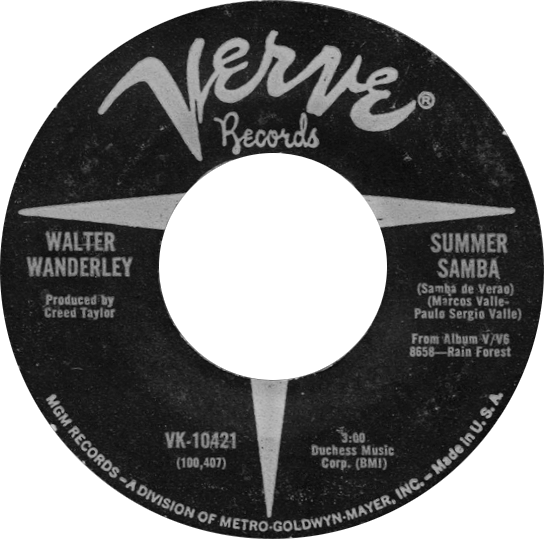
- US 7-inch single

Single by Walter Wanderley

from the album Rain Forest
- B-side: "Call Me"
- Released: 1966
- Recorded: 1966
- Genre: Bossa nova
- Length: 3:00
- Label: Verve
- Songwriters: Marcos Valle; Paulo Sérgio Valle; Norman Gimbel
- Producer: Creed Taylor

Walter Wanderley singles chronology
"Summer Samba" (1966)	"Amanha" (1966)

Music video
- "Summer Samba (So Nice)" on YouTube

Walter Wanderley recorded the song in 1966 as "Summer Samba" for his album Rain Forest, which was produced by Creed Taylor. The album jacket gives the subtitle of the song as "Samba de Verão". On the label, however, it reads "So Nice". The label also credits both lyricists even though it is an instrumental recording.

=== Chart performance ===
Wanderley's version debuted on Billboard magazine's Easy Listening chart in the issue dated August 13, 1966, and got as high as number 3 during its 13 weeks there. The August 27 issue included its first appearance on the Billboard Hot 100, where it peaked at number 26 over the course of nine weeks.

=== Critical reception ===
Thom Jurek of AllMusic wrote that Wanderley's version "is regarded as perhaps a more definitive bossa tune than 'Girl from Ipanema'."

=== Charts ===
Weekly chart performance for "Summer Samba" by Walter Wanderley
Chart (1966)	Peak position
US Billboard Easy Listening	3
US Billboard Hot 100	26

== Johnny Mathis version ==
"So Nice (Samba de Verão)"

Single by Johnny Mathis

from the album So Nice
- B-side: "The Impossible Dream (The Quest)"
- Released: 1966
- Recorded: July 7, 1966
- Genre: Bossa nova
- Length: 3:06
- Label: Mercury
- Producer: Johnny Mathis

Johnny Mathis singles chronology
"The Shadow of Your Smile" (1966)	"So Nice (Samba de Verão)" (1966)	"Two Tickets and a Candy Heart" (1967)

Music video
- "So Nice (Samba de Verão)" on YouTube

Johnny Mathis recorded the song as "So Nice (Samba de Verão)" on July 7, 1966, for his self-produced album So Nice. The music was arranged and conducted by Mort Stevens.

=== Chart performance ===
Mathis's recording debuted on Billboard magazine's Easy Listening chart in the issue dated September 10, 1966, and got as high as number 17 in the October 1 issue.

=== Critical reception ===
In their review column, the editors of Billboard combined some of their comments on the Mathis and Connie Francis versions, summarizing them as "two strong vocal treatments by two top stars". They added that Mathis's was "a warm, lush treatment". The editors of Cash Box featured the Mathis single as one of their Best Bets, which was their equivalent to a letter grade of A for "So Nice". They wrote, "Mathis is cozy on the bossa nova tune, a pretty thing done with its deft English lyric."

=== Charts ===
Weekly chart performance for "So Nice (Samba de Verão)" by Johnny Mathis
Chart (1966)	Peak position
US Billboard Easy Listening	17

== Connie Francis version ==
"So Nice (Summer Samba)"
- Philippines 7-inch single

Single by Connie Francis
- B-side: "All the Love in the World"
- Released: August 1966
- Recorded: August 4, 1966, New York City
- Genre: Bossa nova
- Length: 1:53
- Label: MGM
- Producer: Pete Spargo

Connie Francis singles chronology
"A Letter from a Soldier (Dear Mama)" / "Somewhere, My Love" (1966)	"So Nice (Summer Samba)" / "All the Love in the World" (1966)	"Spanish Nights and You" / "Games That Lovers Play" (1966)

Music video
- "So Nice (Summer Samba)" on YouTube

Connie Francis recorded the song as "So Nice (Summer Samba)" on August 4, 1966, in a studio located in New York City, with Pete Spargo producing. The music was arranged and conducted by Teddy Randazzo. While the song didn't receive an immediate studio album inclusion, the song was chosen both for her Souvenirs (1996) and Cocktail Connie (2009) compilations.

=== Chart performance ===
Francis's recording also debuted on Billboard's Easy Listening chart in the issue dated September 10, 1966, and got as high as number 17, as Mathis's recording did, only one week later, in the October 8 issue.

=== Critical reception ===
In their review column, the editors of Cash Box featured the single as a Pick of the Week, which was their equivalent to a letter grade of A for both "So Nice" and its B-side, "All the Love in the World". Regarding the former, they wrote, "The song is a hauntingly lovely, medium-paced romantic bossa nova with a lyrical melodic undercurrent." In addition to their comment about Francis and Mathis, the editors of Billboard wrote, "The Francis version has a little of the flavor of Sinatra's 'Strangers in the Night'."

=== Charts ===
Weekly chart performance for "So Nice (Summer Samba)" by Connie Francis
Chart (1966)	Peak position
US Billboard Easy Listening	17

== Vikki Carr version ==
"So Nice (Summer Samba)"

Single by Vikki Carr
- B-side: "It Must Be Him"
- Released: September 6, 1966
- Recorded: July 25, 1966
- Genre: Bossa nova
- Length: 2:40
- Label: Liberty
- Producer: Dave Pell

Vikki Carr singles chronology
"My Heart Reminds Me" (1966)	"So Nice (Summer Samba)" / "It Must Be Him" (1966)	"Until Today" / "Now I Know the Feeling" (1966)

Music video
- "So Nice (Summer Samba)" on YouTube

Vikki Carr recorded "So Nice (Summer Samba)" and the song that became its B-side, "It Must Be Him", on July 25, 1966. Dave Pell produced the recordings, which were released as a single six weeks later, on September 6.

=== Chart performance ===
Carr's recording of "So Nice (Summer Samba)" debuted on Billboard magazine's Easy Listening chart in the issue dated October 15, 1966, and got as high as number 32 in the November 5 issue. "It Must Be Him" would be reissued in 1967 and become her first song to reach the Billboard Hot 100.

=== Charts ===
Weekly chart performance for "So Nice (Summer Samba)" by Vikki Carr
Chart (1966)	Peak position
US Billboard Easy Listening	32

== Covers ==
The song had been recorded under its various titles by more than 180 different artists worldwide. A few of the recordings have been praised by the editors of Billboard in reviews of the albums on which they appear, including two from 1966. The editors described Bud Shank's rendition on Brazil! Brazil! Brazil! as "excellent" and the one on Lawrence Welk's Winchester Cathedral as a "standout". There were also two mentions from albums they reviewed in 1967. They thought there was an "outstanding" guitar rendition on Tony Mottola's A Latin Love-In and that the recording by Andy Williams on In the Arms of Love was also a "standout".

AllMusic critics also praised covers of the song. Thom Jurek reviewed Brasil '65 by the Sergio Mendes Trio with Wanda de Sah on vocals and wrote that the album featured "sophisticated melodies, many of which were written by the hottest talents in Brazil, such as Marcos Valle ('Samba de Verão' [aka 'So Nice'])". According to John Bush, the 2003 Astrud Gilberto compilation The Diva "includes all of the classics associated with her … [including] 'So Nice (Summer Samba)'." Bush also commented on the 2004 album Dreamer by Eliane Elias and explained, "Elias connects with her Brazilian pop heritage by choosing to sing, early on, a pair of Astrud Gilberto pieces, 'Call Me' and 'So Nice (Summer Samba)', both of which fortuitously suit the short range of her voice."

== See also ==
- List of bossa nova standards
