= If I Ruled the World: Songs for the Jet Set =

Studio album by Tony Bennett
- Released: April 19, 1965
- Recorded: January 4, 1965 (#4, 6, 10); February 18, 1965 (#3, 7, 9); February 19, 1965 (#1–2, 5, 8, 11–12)
- Studio: Columbia 30th Street (New York City)
- Genre: Jazz
- Length: 41:35
- Labels: Columbia; CL 2343; CS 9143
- Producer: Ernie Altschuler

Tony Bennett chronology
Who Can I Turn To (1964)	If I Ruled the World: Songs for the Jet Set (1965)	The Movie Song Album (1966)

If I Ruled the World: Songs for the Jet Set is a 1965 studio album by Tony Bennett, arranged by Don Costa. Bennett dedicated his recording of "Sweet Lorraine" on the album to Nat "King" Cole, who had died a month before the album's release.

Two singles from the album, "If I Ruled the World" debuted on the Billboard Hot 100 in the issue dated February 13, 1965, peaking at number 34 during its nine-week stay. and number eight on the magazine's Easy Listening chart, during its nine-week stay. number 48 on the Cashbox singles chart during its seven-week stay. and number 40 in The U.K during its five-weeks stay. Another Single, "Fly Me to the Moon", debuted on the Billboard Hot 100 in the issue dated July 23, 1965, peaking at number 84 during a four-week stay, The song peaked at number 17 on the magazine's Easy Listening chart, during its ten-weeks stay. and number 60 on the Cashbox singles chart during its seven-weeks stay.

The album debuted on the Billboard Top LPs chart in the issue dated May 22, 1965, and remained on the chart for 22 weeks, peaking at number 47. it also debuted on the Cashbox albums chart in the issue dated May 15, 1965, and remained on the chart for 17 weeks, peaking at number 32.

On November 8, 2011, Sony Music Distribution included the CD in a box set entitled The Complete Collection.

== Critical reception ==
Professional ratings
Review scores
Source	Rating
AllMusic	4.5/5 stars
Record Mirror	5/5 stars
The Encyclopedia of Popular Music	3/5 stars

William Ruhlmann of AllMusic stated that "There were also two songs from the Richard Rodgers-Stephen Sondheim musical Do I Hear a Waltz?, which was set in Venice. Other sections might not justify the flight theme -- Duke Ellington's "Love Scene" was given a "destination" of Harlem on the back cover, and that neighborhood is on no known flight plan—but with such high-quality material."

Billboard notes "Bennett segues into 'Fly Me to the Moon', fresh and sparkling ... especially with Don Costa providing the backing."

Cashbox thought "The material consists basically of recently penned candidates for the “standard” status."

Record World believed that this is "a beautiful album that will adorn many a record shelf in the very near future."

Variety believed that "There's excellent backing from some topflight instrumentalists and an incidental chorus".

Record Mirror described the album as "marvelous".

== Track listing ==
No.	Title	Writer(s)	Length
1.	"Samba do Avião (Song of the Jet)"	Antônio Carlos Jobim; Gene Lees	3:47
2.	"Fly Me to the Moon"	Bart Howard	4:01
3.	"How Insensitive"	Vinicius de Moraes; Norman Gimbel; Jobim	4:26
4.	"If I Ruled the World"	Leslie Bricusse; Cyril Ornadel	3:03
5.	"Love Scene"	Marshall Barer; Duke Ellington	2:36
6.	"Take the Moment"	Richard Rodgers; Stephen Sondheim	4:02
7.	"Then Was Then and Now Is Now"	Cy Coleman; Peggy Lee	3:08
8.	"Sweet Lorraine"	Cliff Burwell; Mitchell Parish	3:42
9.	"The Right to Love""	Gene Lees; Lalo Schifrin	3:44
10.	"Watch What Happens"	Jacques Demy; Michel Legrand; Gimbel	2:59
11.	"All My Tomorrows"	Sammy Cahn; Jimmy Van Heusen	3:22
12.	"Two by Two"	Rodgers; Sondheim	3:22
Total length:			42:12

Bonus track included on 2013 CD release by Columbia Records.
No.	Title	Writer(s)	Length
13.	"Falling in Love With Love"	Rodgers; Lorenz Hart	3:21
Total length:			45:33

== Personnel ==
- Tony Bennett – vocals
- Al Cohn – tenor sax (#1–3, 9)
- Joe Marsala – clarinet (#8)
- Ralph Sharon – piano
- Carlos Lyra – guitar (#1, 3)
- Bobby Hackett – ukulele (#8)
- Hal Gaylor – bass
- William "Billy" Exiner, Elcio Milito (#1 only) – drums
- Don Costa – arranger, conductor
