= Rain Forest (Walter Wanderley album) =

Studio album by Walter Wanderley
- Released: September 1966
- Recorded: May 16–17, 1966
- Studio: Van Gelder Studio, Englewood Cliffs
- Genre: Bossa nova; exotica; lounge; easy listening
- Length: 34:05
- Label: Verve V6-8658
- Producer: Creed Taylor

Walter Wanderley chronology
Cheganca (1966)	Rain Forest (1966)	A Certain Smile, a Certain Sadness (1966)

Rain Forest is a 1966 album by Walter Wanderley. It contains the pop crossover hit "Summer Samba", which reached No. 26 on the US Hot 100; the album itself reached No. 22 on the Top LPs chart.

== Reception ==
Professional ratings
Review scores
Source	Rating
Allmusic	4/5 stars

Billboard magazine reviewed the album in their September 3, 1966 issue and wrote that the "young Brazilian organist plays superbly" and that ""Summer Samba" has the power to pull this delightful package right up the LP chart".

Judith Schlesinger reviewed the reissue of the album for Allmusic and wrote that the album "does evoke strong water images, like "poolside" and "ice skating rink."" and that the listener is "catapulted straight back to the '60s when bossa nova was new in the U.S. and everyone wanted a piece of it". Schlesinger commented that the shortness of the songs left the "jazzmen...underutilized", but praised Urbie Green's work on "Rain" and "Beach Samba".

Jazz singer Tony Bennett endorsed the album in a liner note quote on the back cover of the 1966 album, writing "If you like: Ella, Duke, Count, Sinatra… you'll love Walter Wanderley's music."

== Track listing ==
1. "Summer Samba (So Nice) (Samba De Verao)" (Norman Gimbel, Marcos Valle, Paulo Sérgio Valle) – 3:07
2. "It's Easy to Say Good-Bye (E Fazil Dizer Adeus)" (Tito Madi) – 2:03
3. "Cried, Cried (Chorou, Chorou)" (Luiz Antonio) – 2:26
4. "Rain (Chuva)" (Durval Ferreira) – 3:48
5. "The Girl from Ipanema (Garota de Ipanema)" (Norman Gimbel, Antônio Carlos Jobim, Vinícius de Moraes) – 2:38
6. "Beloved Melancholy (Saudade Querida)" (Madi) – 2:42
7. "Taste of Sadness (Cheiro de Saudades)" (Luiz Antonio, Ferreira) – 2:54
8. "Beach Samba (Bossa na Praia)" (Geraldo Cunha, Pery Ribeiro) – 3:54
9. "Call Me" (Tony Hatch) – 2:26
10. "Cry out Your Sadness (Chora tua Tristeza)" (Oscar Castro-Neves) – 2:46
11. "The Great Love (O Grande Amor)" (Jobim) – 3:04
12. "Samba do Avião (Song of the Jet)" (Jobim, Gene Lees) – 2:43

== Personnel ==
- Walter Wanderley – arranger, electronic organ, piano
- Claudio Slon – drums
- Jose Marino – bass
- Joe Grimm – flute
- Bucky Pizzarelli – guitar
- Urbie Green – trombone
- Bobby Rosengarden – percussion

Production

- Creed Taylor – producer
- Tony Bennett – liner notes
- Deborah Hay – editing, text editor
- Sung Lee – art direction, design
- Acy Lehman – cover design
- Suzanne White – design coordinator
- Val Valentin – engineer, director of engineering
- Rudy Van Gelder – engineer
- Richard Seidel – executive producer
- Kevin Reeves – mastering
- Smay Vision – package layout
- Tom Greenwood, Carlos Kase, Bryan Koniarz – production coordination
- Ben Young – reissue research, restoration
- Jerry Rappaport – reissue supervisor
