= The Look of Love (1967 song) =

1967 popular song by Burt Bacharach and Hal David

Song by Dusty Springfield

from the album Casino Royale Soundtrack
- B-side: "Give Me Time (L'Amore Se Ne Va)"
- Released: April 1967
- Recorded: January 29, 1967
- Studio: Philips, London
- Genre: Bossa nova, pop
- Length: 4:11
- Label: Colgems
- Composer: Burt Bacharach
- Lyricist: Hal David
- Producer: Phil Ramone

"The Look of Love" is a popular song composed by Burt Bacharach and Hal David and originally popularized by the English pop singer Dusty Springfield. The song is notable for its sensuality and its relaxed bossa nova rhythm. The song was featured in an extended slow-motion interlude to the 1967 spoof James Bond film Casino Royale. It received a Best Original Song nomination at the 40th Academy Awards. The song partially inspired the film Austin Powers: International Man of Mystery (1997). In 2008, the song was inducted into the Grammy Hall of Fame.

Dionne Warwick made her own version that was included in her 1969 album, Dionne Warwick's Greatest Motion Picture Hits.

== Songwriters ==
The music was written by Burt Bacharach, and was originally intended to be an instrumental. Later Hal David added the lyrics, and the song was published in 1967. According to Bacharach, the melody was inspired by watching Ursula Andress as Vesper Lynd in an early cut of the film Casino Royale.

== Recordings ==
=== Early recordings ===
- Stan Getz made the first recording of the song, an instrumental version, in December 1966 for his album What the World Needs Now: Stan Getz Plays Burt Bacharach and Hal David.
- The first recording featuring the song's lyrics was by Dusty Springfield, for the Casino Royale soundtrack. Phil Ramone, the soundtrack's engineer, recorded the song separately from the rest of the film tracks. The film version received a nomination for the Academy Award for Best Original Song at the 40th Academy Awards for songwriters Bacharach and David. Springfield re-recorded the song the same year on her album The Look of Love for Philips Records with an arrangement about half a minute shorter than the soundtrack version. Her Philips single version reached #22 in the U.S. Billboard Hot 100 in November 1967. Springfield's Philips version was later featured in the 2002 film Catch Me If You Can.
  - Both Springfield versions feature a breathy tenor saxophone solo similar in style to Stan Getz. The player has often been misattributed as Duncan Lamont, but the actual player was Bob Efford (1928-2019), who received a Grammy nomination for his contribution.
- Scott Walker recorded a version of the song for his 1969 album Scott: Scott Walker Sings Songs from his T.V. Series which reached no. 7 on the UK Album Chart.

"The Look of Love"

Single by Sérgio Mendes & Brasil '66

from the album Look Around
- B-side: "Like a Lover"
- Released: 1968
- Genre: Bossa nova; jazz
- Length: 3:03
- Label: A&M
- Songwriters: Burt Bacharach, Hal David

Sérgio Mendes & Brasil '66 singles chronology
"My Favorite Things" (1968)	"The Look of Love" (1968)	"The Fool on the Hill" (1968)

- Sérgio Mendes' hit rendition on the Sérgio Mendes & Brasil '66 album Look Around reached #4 on the pop charts after their performance at the 40th Academy Awards telecast in April 1968. The lead vocal on this single was handled by Janis Hansen, not Lani Hall, a rarity in the early Brasil '66 canon.

=== Other recordings ===
- An instrumental version of the song was included on the 1967 Burt Bacharach album Reach Out, which was also featured on the soundtrack for the film The Boys in the Band.
- Isaac Hayes recorded an 11 minute version of the song for his 1970 album ...To Be Continued.
- Diana Krall covered the song on her album The Look of Love (2001).
- Either/Orchestra recorded a version of the song that appears on 1996's Across the Omniverse.

== Impact ==
Actor and comedian Mike Myers said his 1997 film Austin Powers: International Man of Mystery was partially inspired by "The Look of Love". Myers said hearing the song on the radio led to him reminiscing about the 1960s, which helped inspire the movie.

Springfield's recording of "The Look of Love" was used as a recurring motif in the 1999 Australian film Strange Planet. According to director Emma-Kate Croghan, Springfield personally cleared the film's use of the song only days before her death in March 1999.
