= Moondreams (Walter Wanderley album) =

Studio album by Walter Wanderley
- Released: 1969
- Recorded: March 11, 12 & 13, 1969
- Studio: Van Gelder Studio, Englewood Cliffs, NJ
- Genre: Jazz
- Length: 31:31
- Label: A&M/CTI; SP 3022
- Producer: Creed Taylor

Walter Wanderley chronology
When It Was Done (1968)	Moondreams (1969)	Brazil's Greatest Hits (1972)

Moondreams is an album by Brazilian keyboardist Walter Wanderley featuring performances recorded in 1969 and released on the CTI label.

== Track listing ==
1. "Asa Branca" (Luiz Gonzaga) – 4:32
2. "L' Amore Dice Ciao" (Armando Trovajoli, Giancarlo Guardagassi, Roger Greenaway) – 2:41
3. "Penha" (Vicente Paiva) – 2:45
4. "One of the Nicer Things" (Jimmy Webb) – 3:10
5. "Proton, Electron, Neutron" (Marcos Valle, Paulo Sérgio Valle) – 2:47
6. "5:30 Plane" (Webb) – 3:42
7. "Soulful Strut" (Eugene Record, Sonny Sanders) – 3:06
8. "Moondreams" (Egberto Gismonti) – 2:31
9. "Jackie, All" (Eumir Deodato) – 3:33
10. "Mirror of Love" (Deodato) – 2:44

- Recorded at Van Gelder Studio in Englewood Cliffs, New Jersey on December 11, 12 & 13, 1968

== Personnel ==
- Walter Wanderley – organ, electronic harpsichord
- Bernie Glow – trumpet, flugelhorn
- Marvin Stamm – flugelhorn
- Danny Bank, Hubert Laws, Romeo Penque, Jerome Richardson, Joe Soldo – flute
- Jose Marino, Richard Davis, George Duvivier – bass
- João Palma – drums
- Lulu Ferreira, Airto Moreira – percussion
- Flora Purim, Linda November, Stella Stevens, Susan Manchester – vocals
- Harold Coletta, Richard Dickler, Theodore Israel, Archie Levin, David Mankovitz, Warren Tekula, Emanuel Vardi, Harry Zaratzian – viola
- Eumir Deodato – arranger

== Reception ==
Professional ratings
Review scores
Source	Rating
AllMusic	4/5 stars

Richard S. Ginell of AllMusic stated "[O]n the whole, this is a somewhat better album than its predecessor on A&M; the sound is more open and less confined."
