= The Angelettes =

British pop band

- Origin: Manchester, England
- Genres: Pop music
- Years active: 1968–74
- Labels: UK Records; Decca; Mooncrest
- Past members: Sue Hampson (bass/vocals); Pat Fitzgerald (percussion/vocals); Jan Heywood (guitar/vocals); Julie Abbott (guitar/vocals)

The Angelettes were a British pop group who had one UK singles chart top 40 hit in 1972.

== History ==
The group was made up of four school friends (Sue Hampson, Pat Fitzgerald, Jan Heywood, and Julie Abbott) from Droylsden, Manchester, who first practised together in 1968, and performed under various names until settling on White Spirit. After originally focussing on harmonies, by 1971 they had each adopted instruments and cut a demo disc which came to the attention of Jonathan King, who arranged for them to sign to Decca Records with him as producer, and he changed the group's name to The Angelettes.

Their debut single, "Don't Let Him Touch You", was released in March 1972, when the girls were 16 and 17. By the end of May, the single had risen to number 35 in the UK singles chart, and earned the group a place on Top Of The Pops. Unfortunately, around a minute into their performance, a technical fault meant that the sound of the rest of the song was not broadcast, and the single stalled in the chart. Despite this the single reputedly sold 100,000 copies, and reached number 29 on the New Musical Express charts for the week ending 27 May.

Their next two singles ("Popsicles and Icicles", in September, and "Do You Love Me", in January 1973) were released on King's UK Records, but neither charted.

In 1973, the group sang backing vocals for Bryan Ferry on the album These Foolish Things, and they returned to Top Of The Pops to accompany him on his top ten hit "A Hard Rain's Gonna Fall". The group only recorded one further single - "I Surrender", co-written by Ron Roker and Gerry Shury, on the Mooncrest label, in 1974 - which also failed to chart. Without any commercial success, the members took up regular jobs, although occasionally performed on an amateur basis. Sue Hampson died in around 1998.

== Discography ==
- Don't Let Him Touch You/Rainy Day, Decca FR 13284, UK charts no. 35
- Popsicles And Icicles/Hey Girls Gather Round, UK Records UK11
- Do You Love Me?/I Just Want To Say Thank You, UK Records UK26
- I Surrender/Goodbye Jon, Mooncrest MOON 35
