= Look Around (Sérgio Mendes album) =

Studio album by Sérgio Mendes
- Released: July 1967
- Recorded: February 1967
- Studio: Western (Hollywood, California); Sunset Sound (Hollywood, California); Annex (Hollywood, California)
- Genre: Bossa nova
- Length: 30:28
- Label: A&M
- Producer: Herb Alpert, Jerry Moss

Sérgio Mendes chronology
Equinox (1967)	Look Around (1967)	Fool on the Hill (1968)

Professional ratings
Review scores
Source	Rating
AllMusic	4.5/5 stars

Look Around is the third studio album by Sérgio Mendes and Brasil '66. It was released in 1967. Following this album, Mendes dismissed the musicians and singer Janis Hansen and brought in Karen Phillip to sing with holdover Lani Hall.

== Songs ==
Mendes and Brasil '66 performed the Oscar-nominated Burt Bacharach/Hal David song "The Look of Love", one of their biggest hits, on the Academy Awards telecast in March 1968. The album was recorded at the Sunset Sound, Western Recorders, and Annex Studios, Hollywood. Brasil '66's version of "The Look of Love" quickly shot into the top 10, eclipsing Dusty Springfield's version.

"Like a Lover", an English-language version of "O Cantador", was covered by Carmen McRae, Sarah Vaughan, Helen Merrill, Dianne Reeves, Al Jarreau, Natalie Cole, Jane Monheit, and Kimiko Itoh. "So Many Stars" was recorded by Helen Merrill, Tony Bennett, Sarah Vaughan, Jane Monheit, Barbra Streisand, Natalie Cole, and Stacey Kent

"Tristeza" was an instrumental by Lobo and Nitinho and the title track of Baden Powell's Tristeza on Guitar album (1966). It was sung by Astrud Gilberto with lyrics by A. Testa on her Italian language album (1968).

== Reissue ==
A remastered version of the album was released on CD in 2000.

== Track listing ==
1. "With a Little Help from My Friends" (John Lennon, Paul McCartney)
2. "Roda" (Gilberto Gil, João Augusto)
3. "Like a Lover" (Dorival Caymmi, Nelson Motta, Alan Bergman, Marilyn Bergman)
4. "The Frog (A Rã)" (João Donato)
5. "Tristeza (Goodbye Sadness)" (Harold Lobo-Niltinho)
6. "The Look of Love" (Burt Bacharach, Hal David)
7. "Pra Dizer Adeus (To Say Goodbye)" (Edu Lobo, Torquato Neto, Lani Hall)
8. "Batucada (The Beat)" (Marcos Valle, Paulo Sérgio Valle)
9. "So Many Stars" (Mendes, Bergman, Bergman)
10. "Look Around" (Mendes, Bergman, Bergman)

== Personnel ==
- Sérgio Mendes – organ, piano, arranger
- John Pisano – guitar
- Bob Matthews – bass, vocals
- João Palma – drums
- José Soares – percussion, vocals
- Lani Hall – vocals
- Janis Hansen – vocals
- Dave Grusin – arranger, orchestration
- Dick Hazard – arranger, orchestration

== Charts ==
Chart (1967)	Peak position
US Billboard 200	5
US Top Jazz Albums (Billboard)	2
US Top R&B/Hip-Hop Albums (Billboard)	16

== Certifications ==
Region	Certification	Certified units/sales
United States (RIAA)	Gold	500,000^{^}
^{^} Shipments figures based on certification alone.
