= Maurício Pereira =

Brazilian singer-songwriter (born 1959)

- Born: November 8, 1959 (age 66); São Paulo, São Paulo, Brazil
- Genres: Experimental rock, art rock, indie pop, indie rock
- Occupations: Singer-songwriter, journalist, saxophonist, television announcer, stage actor, record producer
- Instruments: Vocals, saxophone
- Years active: 1985–present
- Labels: Tinitus, Lua Music, Tratore, YB Music
- Website: mauriciopereira.com.br

Maurício Pereira (born November 8, 1959) is a Brazilian singer-songwriter, lyricist, journalist, saxophonist, television announcer, stage actor and record producer best known for his work with experimental rock duo Os Mulheres Negras.

== Biography ==
Pereira was born in São Paulo on November 8, 1959. He met musician André Abujamra (son of actor Antônio Abujamra) in 1984, and in the following year they formed Os Mulheres Negras. The duo released two albums, Música e Ciência (1988) and Música Serve pra Isso (1990), through WEA (present-day Warner Music Group) before disbanding in 1991. Both musicians then began their respective solo careers, with Pereira becoming Marcelo Rubens Paiva's bandleader for his talk show Fanzine, hosted by TV Cultura in the early 1990s.

In 1995 Pereira released his debut solo album, Na Tradição, through Tinitus. It was positively reviewed by the critics and public alike. In 1996 he performed at the Centro Cultural São Paulo in what would be the first show in Brazil to be live streamed on the Internet, through his official website. In 1998 he released his second album, Mergulhar na Surpresa, which counted with a guest appearance by pianist Daniel Szafran in their first of many collaborations together.

In 2003 Pereira formed a side project, Turbilhão de Ritmos, and with them he released Canções que um Dia Você Já Assobiou, Vol. 1. It is a cover album containing iterations of old-fashioned songs, recorded live at the Instituto Itaú Cultural. Turbilhão de Ritmos came out with a second album in 2010, Carnaval Turbilhão, a compilation of Carnival marchinhas mostly in public domain.

In 2007 Pereira released Pra Marte, his third solo album, notable for containing the song "Trovoa", which was covered by many bands and artists such as Metá Metá, Maria Gadú, A Banda Mais Bonita da Cidade and Dandara & Paulo Monarco. In the same year he was a guest musician on Rogério Skylab's album Skylab VII; Skylab, an unabashed fan of Os Mulheres Negras, co-wrote alongside Pereira the track "O Mundo Tá Sempre Girando"; he also performs additional vocals in it. Two years later, he appeared on Skylab's live album Skylab IX.

In 2010 Pereira was also featured in Rhaissa Bittar's debut album Voilà; he was a co-writer for the track "Piquenique no Horto".

In 2012 he and Abujamra reformed Os Mulheres Negras, and they continue touring ever since. The following year he was interviewed for a documentary about the duo's history, entitled Música É para Isso: Uma História d'Os Mulheres Negras, directed by Bel Bechara and Sandro Serpa.

In 2014 he released his fourth solo album, Pra Onde que Eu Tava Indo.

His most recent studio album, Outono no Sudeste, came out on May 11, 2018. 2022 saw the release of the live album Micro.

Since 2015 Pereira is part of The Universal Maurício Orchestra, a samba rock/jazz ensemble in which all of its musicians are named Maurício. Besides Pereira, the band is also composed of Maurício Tagliari (electric guitar), Maurício Takara (drums), Maurício Bussab (keyboards), Maurício Badê (percussion) and Maurício Fleury (bass guitar). They released their first, self-titled album through YB Music in 2018.

In 2023, Pereira published his first book, the memoir/songbook Minha Cabeça Trovoa.

== Personal life ==
One of Pereira's sons, Martim "Tim" Bernardes, is a founding member of indie rock band O Terno. Father and son are part of the duo Pereirinha & Pereirão, which plays, in their words, "pop folk country music from the deep Southeast".

== Discography ==
=== With Os Mulheres Negras ===
Year	Album
1988	Música e Ciência: Label: WEA; Format: Vinyl, CD
1990	Música Serve pra Isso: Label: WEA; Format: Vinyl, CD

=== Solo ===
Year	Album
1995	Na Tradição: Label: Tinitus; Format: CD
1998	Mergulhar na Surpresa: Label: Tinitus; Format: CD
2007	Pra Marte: Label: Lua Music; Format: CD
2014	Pra Onde que Eu Tava Indo: Label: Tratore; Format: CD
2018	Outono no Sudeste: Label: Tratore; Format: CD
2022	Micro (live album): Label: Tratore; Format: CD

=== With Turbilhão de Ritmos ===
Year	Album
2003	Canções que um Dia Você Já Assobiou, Vol. 1 (live album): Label: Lua Music; Format: CD
2010	Carnaval Turbilhão: Label: Lua Music; Format: CD

=== With The Universal Maurício Orchestra ===
Year	Album
2018	The Universal Maurício Orchestra: Label: YB Music; Format: Digital download

=== Guest appearances ===
Beto Furquim

- 2008: Muito Prazer (additional vocals and saxophone in "Longe do Planeta")

Rogério Skylab

- 2007: Skylab VII (lyrics, additional vocals and saxophone in "O Mundo Tá Sempre Girando")
- 2009: Skylab IX (lyrics, additional vocals and saxophone in "O Mundo Tá Sempre Girando")

Rhaissa Bittar

- 2010: Voilà (lyrics for "Piquenique no Horto")

== Filmography ==
- 2013: Música É para Isso: Uma História d'Os Mulheres Negras – himself

== Bibliography ==
- 2023: Minha Cabeça Trovoa (Mireveja Editora)
