= Popsicles and Icicles =

Single by The Murmaids
- B-side: "Comedy and Tragedy"
- Released: October 1963
- Genre: Pop
- Length: 2:30
- Label: Chattahoochee
- Songwriter: David Gates
- Producer: Kim Fowley

The Murmaids singles chronology
| "Popsicles and Icicles" (1963) | "Heartbreak Ahead" (1964) |

"Popsicles and Icicles" is a song written by David Gates and performed by the Murmaids. The single was arranged by Nestor La Bonte and produced by Kim Fowley.

== Chart performance ==
=== Charts ===
| Chart (1964) | Peak position |
|---|---|
| Australia | 12 |
| New Zealand Lever Hit Parade | 3 |
| Middle-Road Singles | 2 |
| Billboard Hot 100 | 3 |
| Cash Box Top 100 | 31 |

== Other versions ==
- Percy Faith and His Orchestra on his 1964 EP More Themes for Young Lovers.
- Billy Vaughn on his 1964 album Blue Velvet & 1963's Great Hits.
- The Angelettes as a single in September 1972.
- The Boone Girls on the 2017 re-release of the 1977 Debby Boone album You Light Up My Life.
