= O Homem do Pau-Brasil =

- Directed by: Joaquim Pedro de Andrade
- Screenplay by: Joaquim Pedro de Andrade
- Starring: Flávio Galvão; Regina Duarte; Ítala Nandi; Dina Sfat
- Cinematography: Kiminhiko Kato
- Edited by: Marco Antonio Cury
- Production company: Filmes do Serro
- Distributed by: Embrafilme
- Release date: 22 February 1982 (Brazil)
- Running time: 112 minutes
- Country: Brazil
- Language: Portuguese

O Homem do Pau-Brasil (English: The Brazilwood Man) is a 1981 Brazilian film directed by Joaquim Pedro de Andrade. The film is a fictional recreation of episodes of Oswald de Andrade's life and work.

== Cast ==
- Ítala Nandi...Oswald de Andrade 1
- Flávio Galvão...Oswald de Andrade 2
- Regina Duarte...Lalá
- Cristina Aché...Dorotéa
- Paulo Hesse...Mário de Andrade
- Carlos Gregório...Menotti Del Pichia
- Juliana Carneiro da Cunha...foreign dancer (allusion to Isadora Duncan)
- Dina Sfat...Branca Clara (allusion to Tarsila do Amaral)
- Dora Pellegrino...Rosa Lituana (allusion to Pagu)
- Grande Otelo... Tourvalu de Blesi, African prince
- Etty Fraser...Dona Azeitona

== Reception ==
The critic of Folha de São Paulo wrote: "The reconstitution of the time is stylized, unnatural, and the tone of the staging is ridiculous." and continues "the whole cast is brilliant, and the highlight is Dina Sfat (...) Seen today, when we get used to a low and fearful cinema, O Homem do Pau-Brasil seems like an absurd object."

== Awards ==
1981: Festival de Brasília

1. Best Film (won)
2. Best Supporting Actress (Dina Sfat) (won)
