= Durval Discos =

2002 film directed by Anna Muylaert

- Directed by: Anna Muylaert
- Written by: Anna Muylaert
- Produced by: Sara Silveira; Maria Ionescu
- Starring: Ary França; Etty Fraser; Marisa Orth; Isabela Guasco; Letícia Sabatella
- Cinematography: Jacob Solitrenick
- Edited by: Vânia Debs
- Music by: André Abujamra
- Production companies: Dezenove Som e Imagens; África Filmes
- Distributed by: Europa Filmes; MAM Filmes
- Release date: 2002
- Running time: 96 minutes
- Country: Brazil
- Language: Portuguese
- Budget: R$1.5 million
- Box office: R$406,930

Durval Discos is a 2002 Brazilian absurdist black comedy film written and directed by Anna Muylaert shot in Pinheiros, a borough of São Paulo. The film is noticeable for its soundtrack made up of 1970s Brazilian music that reflects the protagonist's taste, as he is himself a hippie, as well as André Abujamra's original score, more present in the film's second, darker half. The shift of mood from the first part to the second was advertised as life's A and B sides, a reference to the film's homage to LPs.

Abujamra makes a small comical appearance as the character Fat Marley and Brazilian rock singer Rita Lee also has a brief cameo as an eccentric customer who forgets to take the vinyl she has just bought. Some of the records shown in the store include Caetano Veloso's white, signed 1969 album and Tim Maia's Racional, a two-volume album highly sought in Brazil due to its cult status.

== Plot ==
In the late 1990s, Durval (Ary França) is a middle-aged man who owns a record store in the first floor of his overbearing mother's (Etty Fraser) house. A typical hippie, Durval refuses to sell CDs despite the decline in customers. He notices his mother is not giving as much attention to cooking and house chores as she once did, and suggests they hire a maid, a task which is tricky since they are only willing to pay 100 reais. A young woman (Letícia Sabatella) finally appears willing to take on the job, but disappears after one day. They soon discover that she left a little girl called Kiki and a note asking them to take care of her for a few days. Durval and his mother become attached to Kiki, but soon discover she is actually the daughter of a wealthy family from the countryside who has been kidnapped.

== Cast ==
- Ary França as Durval
- Etty Fraser as Carmita
- Marisa Orth as Elisabeth
- Letícia Sabatella as Célia
- Rita Lee as Tia Julieta
- Isabela Guasco as Kiki
- André Abujamra as Fat Marley
- Theo Werneck as DJ Theo
- Regina Remencius as Mãe de Kiki
- Marcelo Mansfield as salesman

== Soundtrack ==
1. Mestre Jonas - Os Mulheres Negras
2. Que Maravilha - Jorge Ben
3. Maracatu Atômico - Gilberto Gil
4. Madalena - Elis Regina
5. Irene - Caetano Veloso
6. Ovelha Negra - Rita Lee
7. Back in Bahia - Gilberto Gil
8. Alfômega - Caetano Veloso
9. Besta É Tu - Novos Baianos
10. Xica da Silva - Jorge Ben
11. London, London - Gal Costa
12. Pérola Negra - Luiz Melodia
13. Mestre Jonas - Sá, Rodrix & Guarabyra

Tim Maia's "Imunização Racional (Que Beleza)" does not appear in the soundtrack album, but is present in the film.

The song "Mestre Jonas", present in the film's opening sequence, relates to the film's story through its lyrics. In the song, Jonas lives inside a whale, which acts as a protection shell (in an allusion to the biblical story of Jonah). Similarly, Durval refuses to move on with the times or move out of his mother's house.
