= Equinox (Sérgio Mendes album) =

Studio album by Sérgio Mendes
- Released: April 1967
- Recorded: November 8, 1966 – February 19, 1967
- Studio: Sunset Sound (Hollywood, California)
- Genre: Bossa nova
- Label: A&M
- Producer: Herb Alpert, Jerry Moss

Sérgio Mendes chronology
Herb Alpert Presents (1966)	Equinox (1967)	Look Around (1967)

Professional ratings
Review scores
Source	Rating
Allmusic	4.5/5 stars

Equinox is the second album by Sérgio Mendes and Brasil '66, released in April 1967, with vocalists Lani Hall and Janis Hansen.

== Track listing ==
1. "Constant Rain (Chove Chuva)" (Jorge Ben, Norman Gimbel)
2. "Cinnamon and Clove" (Johnny Mandel, Alan and Marilyn Bergman)
3. "Watch What Happens" (Michel Legrand, Jacques Demy, Norman Gimbel)
4. "For Me" (Arrastão) (Edu Lobo, Norman Gimbel)
5. "Bim-Bom" (João Gilberto)
6. "Night and Day" (Cole Porter)
7. "Triste" (Antônio Carlos Jobim)
8. "Gente" (Marcos Valle, Paulo Sérgio Valle)
9. "Wave" (Jobim)
10. "Só Danço Samba (Jazz 'n' Samba)" (Jobim, Vinícius de Moraes)

== Personnel ==
Musicians

- Sérgio Mendes – piano, vocals
- John Pisano – guitar
- Bob Matthews (Tracks 2–10), William Plummer (Track 1) – bass, sitar, vocals
- José Soares – percussion, vocals
- João Palma – drums
- Lani Hall, Janis Hansen – vocals

Production

- Bruce Botnick, Larry Levine – recording engineers

== Charts ==
Chart (1967)	position
US Billboard 200	24
US Top Jazz Albums (Billboard)	3

== Certifications ==
Region	Certification	Certified units/sales
United States (RIAA)	Gold	500,000^{^}
^{^} Shipments figures based on certification alone.
