= Janis Hansen (singer) =

American singer-songwriter (1942–2017)

- Also known as: Janis Hansen, Janice Hanson, Janice Hansen-Klinger, Janis S. Hansen, Janis Klinger
- Born: Janice Sue Binkley; October 10, 1942; Great Falls, Montana, U.S.
- Died: October 4, 2017 (aged 74) Sherman Oaks, California, U.S.
- Genres: Pop, Latin, Brazilian, psychedelic soul, new wave
- Occupations: Singer, songwriter, musician, producer, author
- Instruments: Vocals, piano, guitar, bass, drums
- Years active: 1964–1970; sporadically to 2001 (recording artist); 2001 (author)
- Labels: A&M, World Pacific, United Artists, Ford, Robin Road

Janice Sue Klinger (née Binkley; October 10, 1942 – October 4, 2017), professionally known as Janis Hansen, was an American recording artist and author.

== Early life ==
Hansen was born Janice Sue Binkley in Great Falls, Montana the youngest of three children to Florence Irene (née Daggett; 1916–2003) and Fay Henry Binkley (1910–1991). Her father Henry was a professional musician originally from Dexter, Kansas, who re-located to Great Falls two years after marrying his first wife, Arvilla Elaine Anderson, in 1931. Some time after Janice's birth, Henry and Florence divorced; and she moved in with her grandparents at their farm in Absarokee. Her father married Ada Grace Allen (1926–2008) in 1947. She had four siblings: brothers William (1939–1992) and Wesley; and two half-siblings, Rory Ann and Marcus, from her father's re-marriage.

== Music career ==
While majoring in anthropology at the University of Colorado, Hansen participated in a singing group to help pay the tuition, which led to her being discovered by talent scout Jerry McClain. According to Hansen, "I received a telephone call from Los Angeles and was told a singer was needed for The Andy Williams Show. Somebody had heard me singing and I was recommended for the job."

Plans of finishing college were postponed, and Hansen flew to Los Angeles to join The Andy Williams Show.

=== Sergio Mendes and Brasil '66 ===
Having scored a big hit with a cover of Jorge Ben Jor's "Mas que Nada", the Brazilian-inspired pop group, Brasil '66, were riding high on the charts; the demand for touring increased. Bandleader Sérgio Mendes was in need of a second vocalist to complement lead singer Lani Hall after original member Bibi Vogel left the group to pursue an acting career. An acquaintance of Mendes recommended Hansen, who that time was already on The Andy Williams Show; and after a successful audition, Hansen joined Brasil in the middle of 1966. From there, she toured and made television appearances with the group.

Hansen did not sing on their first album, Herb Alpert Presents Sergio Mendes & Brasil '66, nor did she appear on the front cover art (she only appeared on the back). However, she was able to participate on the follow-up albums, Equinox and Look Around. Together with Hall, Bob Matthews, José Soares, and João Palma; Hansen completed the classic line-up of Sérgio Mendes' Brasil '66. She sang lead on their rendition of "The Look of Love" (which only took her ten minutes to record the vocals); a rarity in the group's early canon, since most vocals then were being performed by Hall.

A prospect that Hansen would receive equal billing with Hall in the near future was unfortunately dashed; when in late 1967, Mendes dismissed all members of Brasil 66 over financial disputes and Mendes' autocracy. He quickly replaced them with a new roster, albeit with Hall to return soon at the urging of A&M chief and labelmate, Herb Alpert. The group's version of "The Look of Love" was issued as a single and stayed on Billboard Hot 100 for fourteen weeks, charting to No. 4 by July 1968; all of these occurring after Hansen was no longer part of the group, a success she was not able to relish. Hansen's role in the group would be filled by Karen Philipp; who, along with the new line-up, were the ones featured instead on the sleeve art of "The Look of Love" 45 RPM.

=== The Going Thing and the Carnival ===
In 1968, Hansen joined the Going Thing; a project that Love Generation alumni John and Tom Bahler organized in conjunction with the Ford Motor Company. They appeared in television commercials, performed at dealers conventions, and recorded three promotional giveaway albums. The band included vocalists such as Mitch Gordon, Wes Oldaker, Jacie Berry, Susan Teague. Guitarist Larry Carlton was among the session players who contributed to the project.

Simultaneously, Hansen formed the Carnival with Soares, Matthews, and Palma; under the leadership of organist Walter Wanderley. As Wanderley's backing band, the Carnival played gigs at social events and gained a following. An album for Verve Records was on its way, with a few demo tracks being recorded, when the arrangement with Wanderley and the band fell through. Matthews and Palma exited, and only Hansen and Soares remained. Their line-up was eventually rounded out by ex-Murmaid Terry Fischer and bassist Tommy Neal.

Notable record producer Bones Howe, who had worked with the Association and the 5th Dimension, took an interest in the group and signed them on to Liberty Records' World Pacific division; a second attempt at recording an album had finally commenced. The quartet's "Brasil '66 meets 5th Dimension" sound was largely the brainchild of Howe, who according to Hansen, envisioned the group to be a "Brazilian 5th Dimension". Under the direction of Howe, music accompaniment for the project was provided by L.A.'s first-call studio musicians (retroactively dubbed the Wrecking Crew), which included industry stalwarts such as Hal Blaine and Larry Knechtel.

Two singles, "Son of a Preacher Man" b/w "Walk On By" and "Laia Ladaia" b/w "Canto de Carnival", were issued to promote what was supposed to be their debut. Despite Howe's name attached to the project, however, public reaction was minimal; and plans for a follow-up LP were scrapped. A single culled from the aborted sessions, "Where There's a Heartache (There Must Be a Heart)" b/w "The Truth About It", was released in March 1971 through United Artists Records (which took over after discontinuing Liberty that year). Departing from the overt psychedelic soul influences permeating the group's sound; the single hinted at what would have been their move towards a much mellower direction, in tune with the burgeoning soft rock movement of that period. This was not to be; as the single went off the radar, the Carnival effectively dissolved.

Hansen continued her participation in the Going Thing until its folding, which took place not long after the Carnival's own demise. With both groups no longer active, she retired indefinitely from the music industry.

== Later career ==
After concluding her singing career, Hansen briefly relocated with her family back to Montana; where she became an employee of the state at one point. Despite the shift in occupation, according to a September 1976 interview, Hansen was still open to singing and forming vocal groups (even composing her own songs and becoming proficient in playing a variety of musical instruments).

Sometime after going back to Los Angeles during the 1980s; she recorded her own compositions in the contemporary new wave sound, featuring occasional guitar work provided by Russ Freeman. These were ultimately shelved. It is not known whether these were intended for a solo album or as demos for other recording artists.

Hansen was appointed as vice-president of RDK Productions, a privately held media enterprise co-founded with her husband. Her primary focus from then on went more towards writing and production. For RDK, Hansen was a key force in the development of The Bible Adventure Club project; writing the stories (which were illustrated by Wendy Francisco) and songs, and guiding the artistic overview of the entire series. The series, aimed at children from ages 3 to 7, produced five books.

== Personal life ==
Hansen met Richard Klinger, an entertainment lawyer then in charge of CBS' April/Blackwood Music publishing division, circa 1969. They wed a year later on June 16, 1970 in Los Angeles, California. A socially conscious individual, she was concerned with the effects of climate change and advocated the practice of gardening as a means of self-sufficiency. She also contributed to the opinion section of the Los Angeles Times under the name "Janis Klinger".

== Death ==
Hansen died on October 4, 2017, six days before her 75th birthday, after a long struggle with myelofibrosis and acute myeloid leukemia, at her Sherman Oaks home. Her death was approximately six months after that of Carnival bandmate, Terry Fischer. She is survived by her husband, two children and three grandchildren.

== Bibliography ==
- Hansen, Janis S. (2001). Creation: God's Wonderful Gift. Illustrated by Wendy Francisco. Crossway Books. ISBN 978-1-58134-295-6.
- Hansen, J. (2001). David and His Giant Battle. Illustrated by Wendy Francisco. Crossway Books. ISBN 978-1-58134-324-3.
- Hansen, J. (2001). Jesus: The Birthday of the King. Illustrated by Wendy Francisco. Crossway Books. ISBN 978-1-58134-334-2.
- Hansen, J. (2001). Jonah and His Amazing Voyage. Illustrated by Wendy Francisco. Crossway Books. ISBN 978-1-58134-329-8.
- Hansen, J. (2001). Noah and the Incredible Flood. Illustrated by Wendy Francisco. Crossway Books. ISBN 978-1-58134-339-7.
