= Popcorn (Luiz Henrique and Walter Wanderley album) =

Studio album by Luiz Henrique and Walter Wanderley
- Released: 1967
- Genre: Bossa nova, latin jazz
- Label: Verve
- Producer: Bob Morgan

Walter Wanderley chronology
Batucada (1967)	Popcorn (1967)	Murmúrio (1967)

Popcorn is a 1967 jazz album by vocalist Luiz Henrique and organist Walter Wanderley with band on Verve Records. The album features Luiz Henrique, guitar and vocals, Walter Wanderley, organ; Sivuca, accordion; Romeo Penque, flute, Affonso de Paula, percussion, with James Kappes, Gary Chester, or Donald MacDonald on drums.

== Track list ==
No.	Title	Length
1.	"Happy Birthday"	3:59
2.	"Cabaret"	3:10
3.	"Florianopolis"	3:05
4.	"Kee-Ka-Roo"	2:41
5.	"Diane In The Morning"	4:04
6.	"Popcorn"	3:01
7.	"A Different Beat"	3:22
8.	"Home Of The Range"	2:48
9.	"Blue Island"	3:47
10.	"Dusty Road"	3:02
11.	"In My Automobile"	2:03

== Personnel ==
- Sivuca – accordion
- David Krieger – art direction
- José Marino – bass
- Donald MacDonald (tracks: 3 to 5, 8 to 10), Gary Chester (2) (tracks: 2), James Kappes (tracks: 1, 6, 7, 1) – drums
- Melvin Tax (tracks: 1, 2, 6, 7, 11), Romeo Penque (tracks: 3 to 5, 8 to 10) – flute
- Luiz Henrique – guitar, vocals
- Walter Wanderley – organ, electric Piano, harpsichord
- Alfonso De Paula (tracks: 2), Luiz Henrique (tracks: 1, 3 to 11) – percussion
- Bob Morgan – producer
