= The Love Generation =

American pop-rock band

- Genres: Pop rock
- Years active: 1967–1969
- Past members: John Bahler; Tom Bahler; Mitch Gordon; Jimmy Wasson; Marilyn Miller; Annie White

The Love Generation was an American pop rock band from the 1960s. The band was together from 1967 to 1969.

== History ==
The Love Generation was founded by brothers John Bahler and Tom Bahler. The group was active from 1967 to 1969. John and Tom were vocalists in the Imperial Records stable; they were part of the Ron Hicklin Singers. Two of the songs from The Love Generation — "Together (Havin' a Ball)" and "Let the Good Times In" — were used in the pilot episode of The Partridge Family. Members of the Love Generation and the Ron Hicklin Singers – brothers John and Tom Bahler, Ron Hicklin and Jackie Ward – feature prominently as backing vocalists on the Partridge Family's 1970 debut LP The Partridge Family Album and all the studio albums that followed. They also provided main vocals (instead of David Cassidy) on two tracks on the first album: "I'm on the Road" and "I Really Want to Know You", both written by Barry Mann and Cynthia Weil.

The original lineup consisted of Mitch Gordon, Jimmy Wasson, Marilyn Miller, Annie White and the Bahler brothers.

== Recording career ==
The Love Generation was a studio band and did not tour, leading to the group's disbandment. They made two records which were produced by Tommy Oliver, producing songs like "Let the Good Times In" and "Groovy Summertime". John and Tom made a third record, "Montage", using the name The Love Generation (on the record sleeve John and Tom are pictured in the foreground while the rest of the band is seen disappearing in the background). It is currently very difficult to get hold of these records, although some Japanese imports (usually compilations like "Love and Sunshine") are available. In 2003, a CD of material compiled from their three albums was released by Rev-Ola Records, and it included liner notes by Steve Stanley.

== Later years ==
After the group split up, John and Tom took up different projects such as The Going Thing, which included singer Janis Hansen and guitarist Larry Carlton.

The group is mainly known for promoting products of the Ford Motor Company in the late '60s and early '70s, but had also provided occasional backup vocals on recordings for singer Mark Lindsay when his original group Instant Joy featuring Tony Peluso was unavailable, and had also worked briefly with The Carpenters on their first two albums before the Bahler brothers once again went their separate ways by the mid '70s.

== Notes ==
- Marilyn Miller also sang with The Good Time Singers and provided the singing voice for Sally Field in Gidget. She is not to be confused with Marilyn Monroe, whose name was also Marilyn Miller after her marriage to Arthur Miller, nor Marilyn Miller the Ziegfeld and Broadway star of the 1910s and 20s.
- Ann White (alto-soprano) also sang in The New Christy Minstrels
