= Who Can I Turn To (album) =

- 1964 LP

Studio album by Tony Bennett
- Released: November 16, 1964
- Recorded: August 14, 1964 (#1, 6), September 4, 1964 (#7–8, 11–12); September 29, 1964 (#2, 5, 10); October 14, 1964 (#3–4, 9)
- Studio: CBS 30th Street (New York City)
- Genre: Jazz
- Length: 37:02
- Label: Columbia; CL 2285; CS 9085
- Producer: Ernie Altschuler

Tony Bennett chronology
When Lights Are Low (1964)	Who Can I Turn To (1964)	If I Ruled the World: Songs for the Jet Set (1965)

Alternative cover
- CD reissue

Who Can I Turn To is a 1964 studio album by Tony Bennett.

The single from the album, "Who Can I Turn To?", debuted on the Billboard Hot 100 in the issue dated October 3, 1964, peaking at number 38 during a ten-week run, The song peaked at number 3 on the magazine's Easy Listening chart, during its ten weeks there. and number 38 on the Cashbox singles chart during its eleven weeks there.

The album debuted on the Billboard Top LPs chart in the issue dated December 19, 1964, and remained on the album chart for 19 weeks, peaking at number 42, it also debuted on the Cashbox albums chart in the issue dated December 19, 1964, and remained on the chart for in a total of 20 weeks, peaking at number 28.

On November 8, 2011, Sony Music Distribution included the CD in a box set entitled The Complete Collection.

== Reception ==
Professional ratings
Review scores
Source	Rating
AllMusic	3/5 stars
The Encyclopedia of Popular Music	3/5 stars

William Ruhlmann of AllMusic believed that while "Bennett didn't discover anything to match the title track, and he re-recorded "Autumn Leaves" in a more uptempo framework. But the match of singer and arranger made for a consistent and effective album."

Billboard notes "Tony weaves his beautiful ballad, blues quality around 12 moody greats in musical compositions."

Cashbox praised "Bennett for his potent readings of such gems as 'I Walk A Little Fater', 'There's A Lull In My Life', and 'I've Neven Seen'."

Variety notes "Bennett handles 'em all in slick, savvy warbing style."

== Track listing ==
1. "Who Can I Turn To?" (Leslie Bricusse, Anthony Newley) – 2:57
2. "Wrap Your Troubles in Dreams (and Dream Your Troubles Away)" (Harry Barris, Ted Koehler, Billy Moll) – 3:12
3. "There's a Lull in My Life" (Mack Gordon, Harry Revel) – 3:06
4. "Autumn Leaves" (Joseph Kosma, Johnny Mercer, Jacques Prévert) – 2:00
5. "I Walk a Little Faster" (Cy Coleman, Carolyn Leigh) – 4:23
6. "The Brightest Smile in Town" (Ray Charles, Barry De Vorzon, Robert B. Sherman) – 2:56
7. "I've Never Seen" (Dorcas Cochran, Don Marcotte) – 3:10
8. "Between the Devil and the Deep Blue Sea" (Harold Arlen, Ted Koehler) – 3:15
9. "Listen, Little Girl" (Fran Landesman, Tommy Wolf) – 2:22
10. "Got the Gate on the Golden Gate" (Mel Tormé) – 3:05
11. "Waltz for Debby" (Bill Evans, Gene Lees) – 3:36
12. "The Best Thing To Be Is a Person" (Alan Brandt, Bob Haymes) – 3:00

== Personnel ==
- Tony Bennett – vocals
- Sonny Russo, Bill Byers, Bill Elton, Bart Varsalona – trombones
- Earl Chapin, James Buffington, Richard Berg, Arty DeRosa, Ralph Froelich, Brooks Tillotson – French horn
- Romeo Penque, Ray Beckenstein, Leon Cohen, Irving Horowitz – woodwinds
- Ralph Sharon – piano
- Mundell Lowe, Al Caiola, Wally Richardson – guitar
- Hal Gaylord – bass
- Billy Exiner – drums
- Teddy Sommer – percussion
- George Siravo – arranger, conductor

=== Strings ===
- David Mankovitz, Al Brown, Calman Fleisig, Harold Furmansky – viola
- Tosha Samaroff, George Ockner, Aaron Rosand, Julius Schacter, Paul Gershman, Sol Shapiro, Carmel Malin, Gene Orloff, Peter Dimitriades, Harry Lookofsky, Joe Malin, Max Pollikoff, Harry Urbont, Manny Green, Harry Katzman, Arthur Bogin, Leo Kahn, Leo Kruczek, Arnold Eidus – violin
- Charles McCracken, George Ricci, George Koutzen, Peter Makas, Avron Twerdosky, Maurice Brown, Tony Sophos – cello
