= Casino Royale (1967 soundtrack) =

1967 film soundtrack album

Casino Royale (1967): Original Motion Picture Soundtrack

Soundtrack album by Burt Bacharach, Herb Alpert & the Tijuana Brass and Dusty Springfield
- Released: 1967
- Recorded: 1967
- Genre: Film score
- Length: 34:27
- Label: Colgems

Singles from Casino Royale Soundtrack
- 1. "The Look of Love" Released: 29 January 1967

Casino Royale (1967): Original Motion Picture Soundtrack is the soundtrack to the 1967 film Casino Royale. The album was composed by Burt Bacharach, Herb Alpert & the Tijuana Brass and Dusty Springfield and was released by Colgems in 1967.

== Development ==
For the musical score, producer Charles K. Feldman decided to bring in Burt Bacharach, who had composed the music for Feldman's previous production, What's New Pussycat?. Bacharach worked for over two years writing for Casino Royale, in the meantime composing After the Fox and being forced to decline participation in Luv. Lyricist Hal David contributed with various songs, many of which appear in instrumental versions. Herb Alpert & the Tijuana Brass performed some of the songs with Mike Redway singing the title song as the end credits roll. The title theme was Alpert's second number one on the Easy Listening chart where it spent two weeks at the top in June 1967 and peaked at number 27 on the Billboard Hot 100. Alpert would later contribute a trumpet solo to the title song of the 1983 James Bond film Never Say Never Again, which was performed by Alpert's wife, Lani Hall.

The film features the song "The Look of Love" performed by Dusty Springfield. It is played in the scene of Vesper recruiting Evelyn, seen through a man-size aquarium in a seductive walk. It was nominated for the Academy Award for Best Original Song. The song was revisited in the first Austin Powers film, which, to a degree, was inspired by Casino Royale. For European release, Mireille Mathieu sang versions of "The Look of Love" in both French ("Les Yeux D'Amour"), and German ("Ein Blick von Dir"). Bacharach would later rework two tracks of the score into songs: "Home James, Don't Spare the Horses" was re-arranged as "Bond Street", appearing on Bacharach's album Reach Out (1967), and "Flying Saucer – First Stop Berlin", was reworked with vocals as "Let the Love Come Through" by orchestra leader and arranger Roland Shaw. A clarinet melody would later be featured in a Cracker Jack peanut popcorn commercial. As an in-joke, a brief snippet of John Barry's song "Born Free" is used early in the film. At the time, Barry was the main composer for the Eon Bond series, and said song had won an Academy Award over Bacharach's own "Alfie".

The cover art was done by Robert McGinnis, based on the film poster. The original LP was later issued by Varèse Sarabande in the same track order as shown below. It has been re-released under licence by Kritzerland Records and again by Quartet Records, the latter to mark the film's 50th anniversary. This latest issue has included almost all of Bacharach's underscore, representing 35 tracks in total. The album became famous among audio purists (also called Audiophiles) for the excellence of its recording. It then became a standard "audiophile test" record for decades to come, especially the vocal performance by Springfield on "The Look of Love". The soundtrack has since been released by other companies in different configurations (including complete score releases). The highly regarded master tapes were damaged during a 1990s remastering.

== Track listing ==
All lyrics are written by Hal David; all music is composed by Burt Bacharach.

No.	Title	Performer(s)	Length
1.	"Casino Royale Theme"	Herb Alpert & the Tijuana Brass
2.	"The Look of Love"	Dusty Springfield
3.	"Money Penny Goes for Broke"
4.	"Le Chiffre's Torture of the Mind"
5.	"Home James, Don't Spare the Horses"
6.	"Sir James' Trip to Find Mata"
7.	"The Look of Love (Instrumental)"
8.	"Hi There Miss Goodthighs"
9.	"Little French Boy"
10.	"Flying Saucer – First Stop Berlin"
11.	"The Venerable Sir James Bond"
12.	"Dream on James, You're Winning"	Mike Redway (uncredited)
13.	"The Big Cowboys and Indians Fight at Casino Royale / "Casino Royale Theme" (reprise)"	Mike Redway (uncredited)
Total length:			34:27

== Accolades ==
Award	Category	Recipient(s)	Result	Ref(s)
Academy Awards	Best Song	"The Look of Love"; Music by Burt Bacharach; Lyrics by Hal David	Nominated	
Grammy Awards	Best Original Score Written for a Motion Picture or a Television Show	Burt Bacharach	Nominated	

== See also ==
- Outline of James Bond
