= Os Mulheres Negras =

- Origin: São Paulo, São Paulo, Brazil
- Genres: Experimental rock, comedy rock, art rock, pop rock, indie rock, indie pop
- Years active: 1985–1991; 2012–present
- Label: WEA
- Members: André Abujamra; Maurício Pereira

Os Mulheres Negras (Portuguese for "The Black Women") are a Brazilian experimental rock duo formed in São Paulo in 1985, by musicians André Abujamra (vocals, electric guitar, synthesizer, drum machine) and Maurício Pereira (vocals, saxophone). Self-described as "the world's third smallest big band", they are known for their eclectic musical style characterized by humorous, "cartoonish" lyrics and elaborate theatrical performances which attained them a passionate cult following.

== History ==
Maurício Pereira and André Abujamra (son of the late Antônio Abujamra) met in 1984, at a lecture about African percussion instruments and music (what inspired them to choose the name "Os Mulheres Negras" later on). United by their similar musical tastes and convictions, they began to write material together the following year, and perform in bars around São Paulo, usually wearing stylized, colored overcoats and straw bowler hats.

Their unusual style caught the attention of WEA (present-day Warner Music Group), who offered them a contract; in 1988 they released their debut, Música e Ciência, produced by Pena Schmidt. Characterized by a heavily eclectic sonority which mixed numerous genres, such as samba, baião, lambada, música sertaneja, rap music, Muzak and the works of The Beatles, Heitor Villa-Lobos, George Gershwin and Tom Jobim, it was a commercial failure despite the good critical reception. A slightly less experimental and more accessible follow-up, Música Serve pra Isso, came out also through WEA in 1990. Both of their albums were re-issued in CD format by Warner Music Group in 2001.

The duo went their separate ways in 1991; Abujamra formed the world music project Karnak in 1992, and also became a film and television composer and actor. Pereira began a prestigious solo career and formed the side project Turbilhão de Ritmos in 2003. They continued to collaborate occasionally however; in 1995 they teamed up to write and perform songs for the soundtrack of the popular children's program Castelo Rá-Tim-Bum. In 2002, they recorded the song "Mestre Jonas" for the soundtrack of the film Durval Discos, in which Abujamra cameos as Fat Marley.

In 2012, the duo officially returned to active, and in 2015 they realized a special tour to celebrate their 30th anniversary. They have also stated that they have not ruled out the possibility of working on a third album.

In 2013, Sandro Serpa and Bel Bechara directed a critically acclaimed documentary film about the duo, entitled Música É para Isso: Uma História d'Os Mulheres Negras.

== Discography ==
=== Studio albums ===
Year	Album
1988	Música e Ciência: Label: WEA; Format: Vinyl, CD
1990	Música Serve pra Isso: Label: WEA; Format: Vinyl, CD

=== Miscellaneous ===
Year	Album
2003	Durval Discos: Trilha Sonora Original do Filme: Label: Universal Music Group; Format: CD; Contributed with the song "Mestre Jonas"
