= The Murmaids =

American vocal trio

- Origin: Los Angeles, California, United States
- Genres: Pop
- Years active: 1963–1968
- Label: Chattahoochee Records
- Past members: Carol Fischer; Terry Fischer; Sally Gordon
- Website: www.themurmaids.com

The Murmaids were an American one-hit wonder all-female vocal trio, composed of sisters Carol and Terry Fischer (1 April 1946 – 28 March 2017); and Sally Gordon from North Hollywood, California, United States, who, in January 1964 reached No. 3 on the US Billboard Hot 100 with "Popsicles and Icicles".

== History ==
The Fischer sisters were 15 and 17 years old in 1963. Sally Gordon, also 17, was a fellow student of Terry Fischer at Grant High School, where they sang in the choir. The Fischers' father was Carl Fischer, composer of standards such as Billie Holiday's "You've Changed" and "We'll Be Together Again," sung by Frankie Laine. Carl Fischer was also Laine's musical director and arranger for 10 years. Their mother, Terry Sr., sang with the big bands of the day, ultimately becoming the first female singer with the Stan Kenton Orchestra. Their grandmother and her three sisters played the vaudeville circuit as the Locus Sisters. Sally’s father, Leonard Gordon, was Assistant Music Librarian at Paramount Pictures.

Carol and Terry Fischer made their first recordings singing on demos produced by Mike Post. A school friend of Terry Fischer's, Post would occasionally have the Fischer sisters provide back-up vocals on sessions at Gold Star Studios. Sally Gordon was hired to sing with the sisters on a demo record for producer Kim Fowley. He presented the group to Ruth Conte who signed them to her company, Chattahoochee Records.

=== "Popsicles and Icicles" ===
Billed as the Murmaids, the Fischer sisters and Sally Gordon recorded only one track for Fowley, "Popsicles and Icicles" (written by David Gates, the future founder and front man of the band Bread). Another group recorded four other tracks – "Blue Dress", "Bunny Stomp", "Comedy and Tragedy", and "Huntington Flats" – each of which served as a B-side for one of the pressings of "Popsicles and Icicles". According to lead vocalist Terry Fischer, the Murmaids completed the tracks for an album release "a couple of weeks after we recorded the single." The vocal arrangements for the Murmaids sessions were by Skip Battin. According to Sally Gordon the album was recorded during a school vacation after "Popsicles and Icicles" became a hit many months after it was recorded at Gold Star Records. The engineer was Stan Ross.

"Popsicles and Icicles" began receiving airplay in San Francisco and then Los Angeles in October 1963, breaking nationally in November, and reaching its peak at No. 3 on Billboard and Cash Box on charts dated 11 January 1964. The song also spent three weeks at number two on the Middle-Road Singles (now called Adult Contemporary) chart. The Music Vendor chart ranked "Popsicles and Icicles" at No. 1 for the week of 18 January. Music Vendor's next No. 1 was "I Want to Hold Your Hand" by the Beatles, "Popsicles and Icicles" is sometimes cited as the last No. 1 of the pre-British Invasion rock and roll genre.

The Murmaids made one television appearance on the Lloyd Thaxton show in 1964. The group broke up, which delayed the release of the album. Chattahoochee Records re-formed the group with Sally Gordon and two other sisters in the early 1970s. With producer Kim Fowley, they recorded two singles, one of them called "Paper Sun", with Sally Gordon doing the vocal arranging.

In the UK, "Popsicles and Icicles" was released on Stateside Records, with "Comedy and Tragedy" as the B-side. The tune did not chart, however, possibly due to unfamiliarity with the term popsicles, which in Britain are called "ice lollies". "Popsicles and Icicles" did afford the Murmaids a hit in Australia (where popsicles were known as "icy poles") via a W&G Records release (backed by "Comedy and Tragedy"), which reached No. 12 in February 1964.

"Popsicles and Icicles" was ranked No. 31 on Cash Box's "Top 100 Chart Hits of 1964".

== Aftermath ==
We never got an accounting.... Now, we're meeting people all over the country who say "Oh my God! I love that song." We're just amazed at how many people knew that song. We had no idea.
– Terry Fischer

Terry Fischer would recall that from the time the Murmaids met Kim Fowley "within...three months we had recorded the single, recorded an album and...had risen to #3...the downside is it lasted about 6 months and then it was finished." "When ["Popsicles and Icicles"] was a hit, we had calls from every major record company and mother said, 'No, [Chattahoochee Records owner Ruth Conte] took a chance on us and we're gonna stick with her.'" (The Murmaids' mothers acted as the group's managers; Carl Fischer was deceased.) "I guess we did about two television shows and a local concert here [in Los Angeles]. And that's all we did. At that time we got a statement from the record company charging us an exorbitant amount of money against royalties...Everyone else got paid. Kim Fowley got paid. The musicians got paid. We were paid nothing."

There was an album. Terry: "A couple of weeks after we recorded the single, we went in and recorded an album which we never heard until about five years ago. We never heard it at that time and that was over forty years ago." In fact, Chattahoochee released two further singles off The Murmaids album—"Heartbreak Ahead" and "Wild and Wonderful"—and subsequently used the Murmaids name for at least two singles which did not feature any of the three "Popsicles and Icicles" singers. The vocalists on these latterday Murmaids singles have been identified as Cathy Brasher—a solo act on the Chattahoochee roster—and Yvonne Young. Fowley said the Murmaids joined with Jackie DeShannon to form the Chattahoochee act the Lady-Bugs, whose cover of "How Do You Do It?", the Gerry and the Pacemakers 1963 UK No. 1, lost out to the US re-release of the original in the summer of 1964. However, Fischer does not mention any involvement of any of the original Murmaids in that recording.

In 1968, Liberty Records used the Murmaids name for the release of a single version of the Traffic song "Paper Sun". The vocalist on "Paper Sun" was Sally Gordon. That was the last "Murmaids" single release.

== Later history of Carol and Terry Fischer and Sally Gordon ==
Sally Gordon left for Lewis & Clark College in Portland, Oregon in September 1963, before "Popsicles" became a hit. After the song completed its chart run, Terry Fischer went off to college while Carol Fischer continued with high school.

In 1969, Terry Fischer recorded as a member of The Carnival. whose self-titled album on Liberty was produced by Bones Howe; the Carnival also featured Janis Hansen and Jose Suares. both former members of Sérgio Mendes and Brasil '66. Subsequently, Terry Fischer had a prolific career as a background vocalist with television appearances on Kraft Music Hall, The Merv Griffin Show, the Jerry Lewis Telethon and The Tonight Show Starring Johnny Carson, and live work with Steve Lawrence and Eydie Gormé, Don Rickles, Sonny and Cher and Tina Turner. Terry Fischer's career highlight came in 1977: while working as a percussionist and vocalist supporting Fabian in Lake Tahoe, she was spotted by sax player Sam Butera and invited to sing with Sam Butera and the Witnesses on their gig opening Frank Sinatra's Ol' Blue Eyes is Back Tour.

Carol Fischer married John Morell, a prolific session guitarist. The couple have two sons who are both musicians.

Sally Gordon married Daniel Mark, studio musician and Vikki Carr’s bass player, and had a son, Emmy-winning film editor Tony Mark. She worked as a studio singer until 1976, when she went to work for Warner Bros. Records, then for Francis Coppola, and finally was head of promotions and public relations at Lucasfilm from 1981 to 1987. She then moved to Paris, France where she became a historical researcher and translator, as well as a singer and piano teacher. She later moved to Italy to work on the biography of film producer Robert Watts.

In 1995, Collectables Records issued a Golden Classics remastered CD of "Popsicles and Icicles" featuring the original trio.

In 1998, the Fischer sisters reformed The Murmaids with a third singer, Cynthia Perry (replaced by Petra Rowell, then replaced by Suzi Robertson), debuting the new act at a "Legends of Rock 'n Roll" show in Los Angeles in October of that year. They subsequently released a CD called The Murmaids Splash Back.

Terry Fischer died on 28 March 2017 at age 70 from Parkinson's disease.

== Discography ==
=== Albums ===
- 1980 LP The Mermaids Resurface - Chattahoochee CHLP 628
- 1995 CD Popsicles and Icicles - Collectables
- 2002 CD Murmaids Splash Back! - The Orchard

=== Singles ===
| Year | Title | Peak chart positions | | Record Label | B-side |
| Year | Title | US Pop | US AC | Record Label | B-side |
|---|---|---|---|---|---|
| 1963 | "Popsicles and Icicles" | 3 | 2 | Chattahoochee | "Blue Dress" |
| 1964 | "Heartbreak Ahead" | 116 | — | Chattahoochee | "He's Good to Me" |
| 1964 | "Bull Talk" | — | — | Chattahoochee | "Wild and Wonderful" |
| 1966 | "Go Away" | — | — | Chattahoochee | "Little Boys" |
| 1968 | "Paper Sun" | — | — | Liberty | "Song Through Perception" |

=== Compilation appearances ===
- "Popsicles, Icicles" on CD 1964 Classic Rock: The Beat Goes On - Time-Life
- "Popsicles & Icicles" on CD Early Girls Volume 1 - ACE Records LTD 1995 Made in United Kingdom.
- "Popsicles and Icicles" on CD The All-Time Greatest Girl Groups - Varese Sarabande 2000
