= It Must Be Him =

It Must Be Him may refer to:

- It Must Be Him (Vikki Carr album), 1967
- It Must Be Him (Ray Conniff album), 1967
- "It Must Be Him" (song), a 1967 popular song with music written by Gilbert Bécaud
- It Must Be Him (musical), a 2010 off-Broadway musical with music by Larry Grossman
