= Walter Wanderley =

Brazilian organist and pianist (1932–1986)

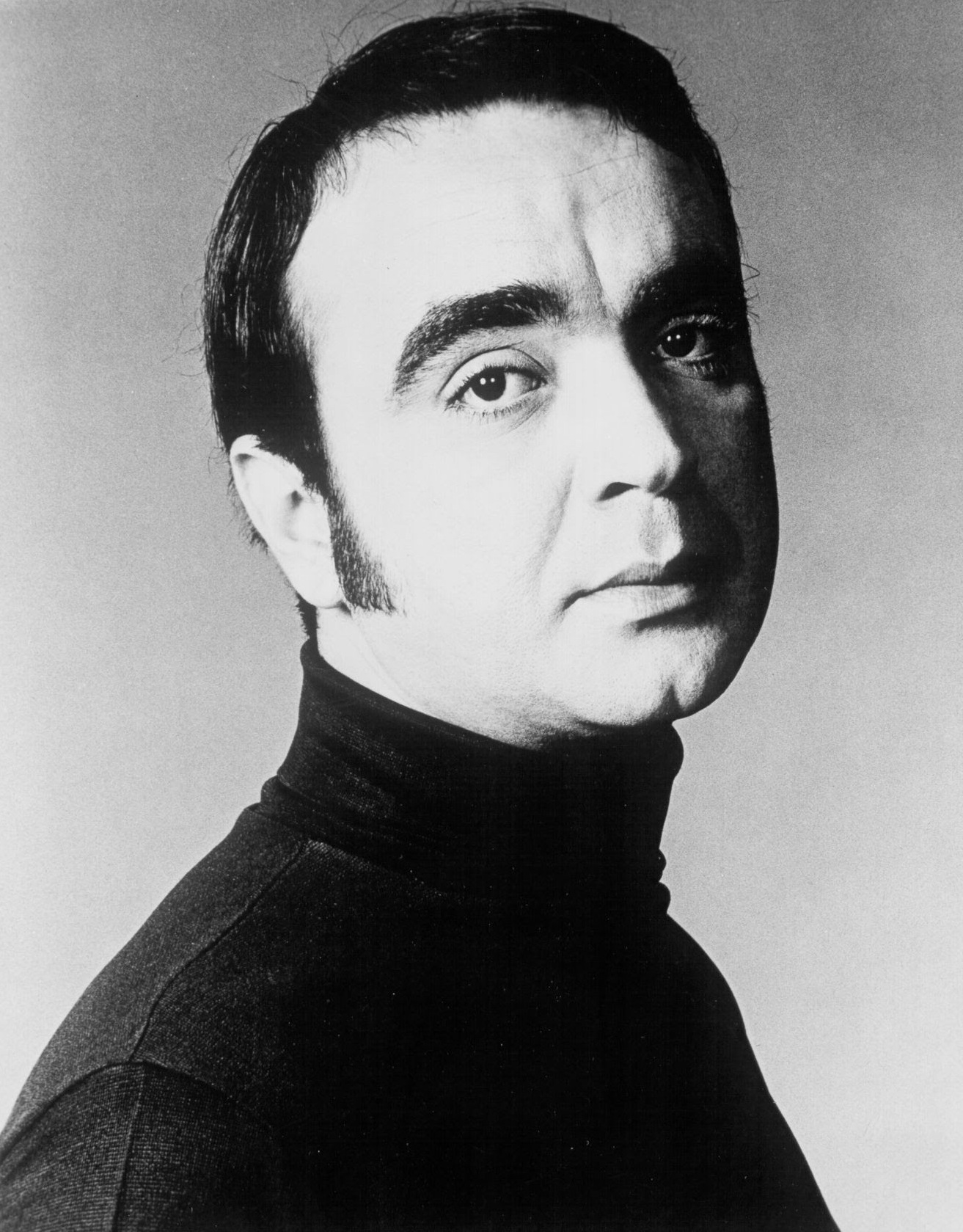
- Wanderley in 1969

Background information
- Born: Walter Jose Wanderley Mendonça; May 12, 1932; Recife, Brazil
- Died: September 4, 1986 (aged 54) San Francisco, United States
- Genres: Bossa nova, lounge, easy listening
- Occupation: Musician
- Instruments: Organ, piano
- Labels: Verve, Canyon, A&M/CTI, GNP Crescendo
- Formerly of: The Carnival

Walter Wanderley (/ˈvɒndərleɪ/; born Walter Jose Wanderley Mendonça, May 12, 1932 – September 4, 1986) was a Brazilian organist and pianist, best known for his lounge and bossa nova music and for his instrumental version of the song "Summer Samba" which became a worldwide hit.

== Biography ==
Wanderley was born in Recife, Brazil. Already famous in his native country by the late 1950s, he became an internationally renowned star in the mid-1960s through his collaboration with the singer Astrud Gilberto.

He recorded six albums on the Verve label between 1966 and 1968. Three of those albums, Rain Forest, Cheganca, and Astrud Gilberto's A Certain Smile, A Certain Sadness, were with a trio consisting of Wanderley, Claudio Slon (drums), and Jose Marino (bass) and were produced in the United States by Creed Taylor, who initially brought the trio to the U.S. to record at the persuasion of Tony Bennett. Wanderley's U.S. recording of Summer Samba reached No. 26 on the Billboard charts in the summer of 1966. Another album recorded during that period was Popcorn, in collaboration with the Brazilian singer-guitarist Luiz Henrique Rosa. Around that same period Wanderley also established The Carnival with Bob Matthews, João Palma, José Soares, and Janis Hansen; all former members of Sérgio Mendes' Brasil '66.

After the trio disbanded (though they were briefly reunited in 1971 for "The Return of the Original" on Canyon Records), Wanderley himself continued to record albums on Verve, A&M/CTI, and GNP Crescendo. During that time, he also made numerous personal appearances, including a concert tour of Mexico.

Wanderley was known for his distinctive staccato stuttering style and mastery of the Hammond B-3 organ and on later recordings and during live concerts an L Series Hammond. His later career was blighted by alcoholism and he died of bone cancer in 1986 in San Francisco, California, aged 54.

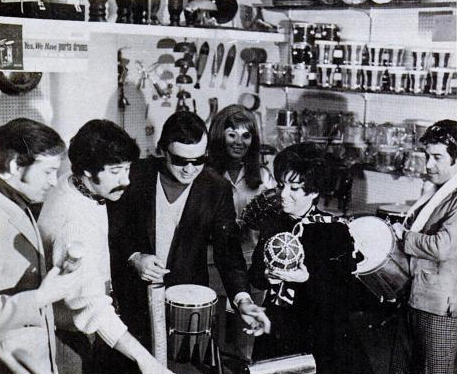
Wanderley (center) with the Walter Wanderley group in 1968

He was married to Isaurinha Garcia, one of the most popular singers in Brazil in the 1940s and 1950s.

== Discography ==
=== Albums ===
- 1959: Festa Dançante (RGE)
- 1959: Feito Sob Medida (Odeon MOFB-3109)
- 1960: Eu, Você e Walter Wanderley (Odeon MOFB-3085)
- 1961: Sucessos Dançantes Em Ritmo de Romance (Odeon MOFB-3155)
- 1961: O Sucesso é Samba (Odeon MOFB-3204)
- 1962: Samba é Samba (Odeon MOFB-3248)
- 1962: O Samba é Mais Samba (Odeon MOFB-3285)
- 1962: E O Bolero (Odeon MOFB-3289)
- 1963: Samba No Esquema (Odeon MOFB-3358)
- 1963: Walter Wanderley’s Brazilian Organ (Capitol ST-1856)
- 1964: Entre Nós (Philips P 632.197 L)
- 1964: Órgão Sax Sexy (Philips P 632.721 L)
- 1964: O Toque Inconfundivel (Philips P 632.726 L)
- 1965: Quarteto Bossamba (Som Maior)
- 1965: O Autêntico Walter Wanderley (Philips P 632.757 L)
- 1965: Samba So (Fermata)
- 1966: Sucessos + Boleros (Philips P.632.894 L)
- 1966: Rain Forest (Verve V6-8658)
- 1966: A Certain Smile, a Certain Sadness (with Astrud Gilberto; Verve V6-8673)
- 1966: Chegança (Verve V6-8676)
- 1967: Brazilian Blend (Philips PHM 600–227)
- 1967: Organ-ized (Philips PHM 200–233)
- 1967: Batucada (Verve V6-8706)
- 1967: Popcorn (Verve V6-8734)
- 1967: Murmúrio (Tower ST 5058)
- 1967: Kee-Ka-Roo (Verve V6-8739)
- 1968: When It Was Done (A&M / CTI SP-3018)
- 1969: Moondreams (A&M / CTI SP-3022)
- 1971: The Return of the Original (Beverly #SULP 19004)
- 1980: Brazil's Greatest Hits! (GNP Crescendo)
- 1981: Perpetual Motion Love (GNP Crescendo #GNPD 2142)

=== Singles ===
- "Summer Samba (So Nice)" – US No. 26, 1966
- "Amanha" (1966) – US AC #20
- "On the South Side of Chicago" (1967) – did not chart

=== Side work ===
Wanderley's earliest appearances on recordings were contributions for other artists. Examples include Joao Gilberto, Elisete Cardoso, and Dóris Monteiro.
