= André Abujamra =

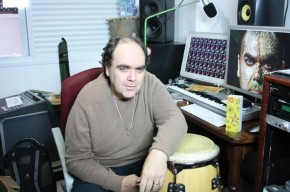
- Abujamra in 2012
- Born: André Cibelli Abujamra; May 15, 1965 (age 61); São Paulo, São Paulo, Brazil
- Occupations: Singer-songwriter, lyricist, multi-instrumentalist, actor, record producer, score composer
- Years active: 1985–present
- Musical career
- Genres: Experimental rock, indie rock, indie pop, world music
- Instruments: Vocals, electric guitar, synthesizer, drum machine, keyboards
- Labels: Spin Music, Tratore
- Member of: Karnak, Os Mulheres Negras

André Cibelli Abujamra (born May 15, 1965) is a Brazilian score composer, musician, singer, guitarist, actor, and comedian of Lebanese and Italian origin. Both his father, Antônio Abujamra, and cousin, Clarisse Abujamra, are actors.

== Film work ==
Abujamra has worked on nearly 30 films in his career since entering the Cinema of Brazil in 1988, and has composed the soundtracks to acclaimed Brazilian films such as Durval Discos (2002), Carandiru (2003), and Cafundó (2005). He has also had several minor roles in Brazilian films and has written soundtracks for Brazilian TV channel Eurochannel.

== Band work ==
He was singer and guitar player for a band called Karnak. They have released three CDs: Karnak (1995), Universo Umbigo (1997), and Estamos Adorando Tóquio (2000). Alongside Maurício Pereira he is also part of the experimental rock duo Os Mulheres Negras.

His album Omindá was ranked as the 17th best Brazilian album of 2018 by the Brazilian edition of Rolling Stone magazine and among the 25 best Brazilian albums of the second half of 2018 by the São Paulo Association of Art Critics.

In 2021, his album Emidoinã was nominated for the Latin Grammy Award for Best Portuguese Language Rock or Alternative Album.

== Awards ==
He has won four professional awards in his career to date, and he won the Kikito Award for the soundtrack of "As Rosas não Falam".
