= Verve Records =

American record label (founded 1956)

- Parent company: Universal Music Group; Previously; MGM Records (1960–1972); PolyGram (1972—1998)
- Founded: 1956; 70 years ago
- Founder: Norman Granz
- Distributor: Verve Label Group
- Genre: American contemporary; historically jazz music
- Country of origin: United States
- Location: New York City, New York
- Official website: www.ververecords.com

Verve Records (Verve Recs) is an American record label owned by Universal Music Group (UMG). Founded in 1956 by Norman Granz, the label is home to the world's largest jazz catalogue, which includes recordings by Ella Fitzgerald, Cal Tjader, Nina Simone, Paul Bley, Stan Getz, Bill Evans, Billie Holiday, Oscar Peterson, Jon Batiste, and Diana Krall, among other notable artists, as well as a diverse mix of recordings that fall outside the jazz category, with albums from such disparate artists as the Velvet Underground, Kurt Vile, Arooj Aftab, Frank Zappa and the Mothers of Invention, and many more. It absorbed the catalogues of Granz's earlier label, Clef Records, founded in 1946; Norgran Records, founded in 1953; and material which was previously licensed to Mercury Records.

The label has continued to be the home to an eclectic mix of modern artists, including Kurt Vile, Everything But the Girl, Samara Joy and Arooj Aftab. The restructured Verve Records is now part of the Verve Label Group (VLG), a subsidiary of Universal Music Group. This company is also home to historic imprints including Verve Forecast, Impulse! and Decca Records.

== History ==
Norman Granz created Verve to produce new recordings by Ella Fitzgerald, whom he managed; the first album the label released was Ella Fitzgerald Sings the Cole Porter Song Book. The catalog grew throughout the 1950s and 1960s to include Charlie Parker, Bill Evans, Stan Getz, Billie Holiday, Oscar Peterson, Ben Webster, and Lester Young.

By 1960 Milton Rudin, Granz' attorney, represented Frank Sinatra and knew that Sinatra wanted his own label. Sinatra and Granz made a handshake deal, but negotiations broke down over price and Sinatra's desire that Granz remain head of the label. Granz sold Verve to MGM in 1960. Sinatra established Reprise Records and hired Mo Ostin, an executive at Verve, to run it. At Verve, Creed Taylor was made head producer. Taylor adopted a more commercial approach, terminating several contracts. He brought bossa nova to America with the release of Jazz Samba by Stan Getz and Charlie Byrd, Getz/Gilberto, and Rain Forest by Walter Wanderley. Verve's arrangers included Claus Ogerman and Oliver Nelson. According to Ogerman in Jazzletter, he arranged 60–70 albums for Verve from 1963 to 1967.

In 1964, Taylor supervised the creation of a folk music subsidiary named Verve Folkways which was later renamed Verve Forecast. Taylor left Verve in 1967 to form CTI Records. Aside from jazz, Verve's catalogue included the Righteous Brothers, the Velvet Underground, Frank Zappa & the Mothers of Invention, Rare Earth, and the Blues Project, as well as a series of "Sound Impressions of an American on Tour" records which was produced in cooperation with Esquire Magazine.

The late 1960s relationship between Verve and other MGM labels is illustrated in the promotional "Music Factory" radio series for college stations hosted by A&R man Tom Wilson, with studio guests from a variety of MGM labels: Janis Ian, Dave Van Ronk, Richie Havens, the Cowsills, Lovin' Spoonful and more. Meanwhile, the program's conversations and advertisements pitched everything from Nico and the Velvet Underground (produced by Wilson) and the Bosstown Sound bands (Beacon Street Union, Ultimate Spinach and Orpheus), to MGM movie-soundtrack LPs such as Gone with the Wind.

While the Velvet Underground's first records did not initially sell well, the band became a major influence in independent rock music. See The Velvet Underground & Nico and their second album, White Light/White Heat.

In the 1970s, Verve became part of PolyGram, incorporating the Mercury/EmArcy jazz catalog, which Philips, part-owners of PolyGram, had earlier acquired. Verve Records became the Verve Music Group after PolyGram was merged with Seagram's Universal Music Group in 1999. The jazz holdings from the merged companies were folded into this sub-group.

In 1990, British group Talk Talk signed to Polydor after conflicts with their previous label EMI regarding a lack of commercial allure on their fourth album, Spirit of Eden. Their fifth and final album, Laughing Stock, was released through Verve on September 16, 1991 and, while being slightly divisive at the time, has since been reconsidered by critics and fans as their masterpiece and a precursor to the post-rock movement.

In the 1990s, as part of PolyGram Classics and Jazz, Verve signed Herbie Hancock, Wayne Shorter, Joe Henderson, Roy Hargrove, John Scofield, Shirley Horn, Betty Carter, Abbey Lincoln, Chris Botti, Jeff Lorber, Gino Vannelli, Art Porter, Will Downing, Christian McBride and Incognito.

When Universal and PolyGram merged in 1998, Verve's holdings were merged with Universal's GRP Recording Company to become Verve Music Group. Verve was corporately aligned with Universal Music Enterprises (UMe) in 2006 and was no longer a stand-alone label within UMG during that time.

Under this regime, led by UMe's President, Bruce Resnikoff, Verve won the Grammy for album of the year, the first time a jazz record had garnered this award since another Verve album, Stan Getz's Getz/Gilberto, won in 1965.

Verve Records went through several other leadership changes in the aughts (including stints by Danny Bennett and David Foster) before Jamie Krents took over with a revamped label team in 2019. Notable moments during this period include the signing of Jon Batiste, Samara Joy, Kurt Vile and Arooj Aftab. Verve has had particularly strong showings at the Grammy Awards since 2019 with Jon Batiste leading the music industry in 2022 with 11 nominations and 5 wins, including album of the year, as well as a win for Aftab in Best Global Performance, and Samara Joy winning Best New Artist in 2023, a first in the label's 67-year history.

The Verve imprint itself manages much of the jazz catalog that once belonged to PolyGram (not including recordings by Herb Alpert for his A&M Records label which Alpert acquired in a legal settlement with Universal Music and are licensed to Shout! Factory), while the Impulse! Records imprint manages the portion of Universal's catalog that was acquired from ABC Records, which itself includes the jazz catalog of the Famous Music Group, which was once owned by Paramount Pictures/Gulf+Western, but which was sold to ABC in 1974. Meanwhile, GRP manages the rest of MCA/Universal's jazz catalog, including some releases once issued on the Decca and Chess labels.

== Verve Label Group ==
The Verve Label Group is the American contemporary, classic and jazz division of Universal Music Group in the US. Labels in the group include Verve and Impulse! Records labels and Universal Music Classics. Verve labels are Verve Records and Verve Forecast. Universal Music Classical consists of Decca Gold label plus represents the European imprints Decca Records, Decca Classics, Deutsche Grammophon, Philips Classics and Mercury KX plus ECM Records distributed label.

On May 20, 2016, the newly-formed Verve Label Group appointed industry veteran Danny Bennett as its president and CEO. Besides Verve, the label group was formed with Decca Records, Decca Classics, Deutsche Grammophon, Mercury Classics, and distributed label ECM. The group relocated to New York City.

The label group in March 2019 was further restructured to its global classical and jazz unit. Dickon Stainer, President and CEO of Universal Classics and Jazz, would lead the group with Bennett exiting his post. The Decca Broadway label for original cast recording was relaunched in May 2019.

The Verve Label Group has expanded its output beyond jazz to include crossover classical music, progressive pop, and show tunes (by absorbing Decca Records' Broadway label and taking over ownership of the label's library including EMI's, MGM Records', and MCA Records' musical theater catalogs).
