= Second Spanish Album =

Compilation album by The Sandpipers
- Released: 1970
- Genre: Pop/Rock
- Label: A&M AMLS 969 (UK)
- Producer: Tommy LiPuma

The Sandpipers chronology
Greatest Hits (1970)	Second Spanish Album (1970)	Come Saturday Morning (1970)

Alternative cover
- Australia release

Second Spanish Album was an LP album featuring The Sandpipers released in 1970 in the United Kingdom (A&M AMLS 969). Other international releases included Australia (A&M AML-33753), Germany (A&M 2320 008), Mexico (A&M AML/S 1045), New Zealand (A&M SAML-933753), and Venezuela (A&M AMC 2134). It was re-released in 1973 in Australia (World Record Club S-5395, different cover, titled Spanish Album). The album was not released in the U.S. or Canada.

Except for "Born Free", the tracks were all songs that had previously been released on the earlier Sandpipers albums Softly and The Wonder of You. However, some of the tracks are shortened and others extended. Most of the Spanish vocals were redone for this album.

== Track listing ==
1. Let Go (Porque Te Vas?) (Norman Gimbel/Baden Powell) [shortened version as compared to English version]
2. Wave (Sencacional) (Antonio Carlos Jobim)
3. All My Loving (Con Todo Mi Amor) (Lennon–McCartney) [longer than English version]
4. Love Is Blue (El Amor Es Triste) (André Popp/Pierre Cour/Brian Blackburn)
5. To Put Up With You (Yo Ya Me Voy) (Roger Nichols/Paul Williams)
6. That Night (Amor Fugaz) (Norman Gimbel/Lalo Schifrin)
7. Born Free (Libre) (John Barry/Don Black)
8. Pretty Flamingo (Como Un Flamingo) (Mark Barkan)
9. Yellow Days (La Mentira) (Alan Bernstein/Álvaro Carrillo)
10. The More I Love You (Lo Mucho Que Te Quiero) (René Herrera/Sammy Ibarra/René Ornelas)
11. A Man Without Love (Quando M'Innamoro) Cuando Me Enamoro (Roberto Livraghi/Barry Mason/Duranice Pace/Marissa Panzeri) [longer than original Italian version]

== Production ==
- Producers: Tommy LiPuma, Chuck Anderson
- Arrangers: Nick DeCaro, Mort Garson, Bob Thompson
- Engineer: Ray Gerhardt
- Art Director: Tom Wilkes
- Photography - Front Cover: Tom Wilkes
- Photography - Back Cover: Jim McCrary
- Sleeve Notes: Chuck Anderson
- Spanish lyrics: Rosendo Montiel & Chuck Anderson
