= Come Saturday Morning (The Sandpipers album) =

Studio album by The Sandpipers
- Released: August 1970
- Genre: Pop/Rock
- Labels: A&M SP 4262 (US); AMLS 99 (UK)
- Producer: Bob Alcivar

The Sandpipers chronology
Second Spanish Album (1970)	Come Saturday Morning (1970)	A Gift of Song (1971)

Alternative cover
- Australia release

Professional ratings
Review scores
Source	Rating
Allmusic	4.5/5 stars

Come Saturday Morning was an LP album featuring The Sandpipers, released by A&M Records in August 1970. The album reached #96 on the Billboard charts.

The title track was also issued as a single and reached #17 on the Billboard charts. This was a different recording from the version released on the soundtrack album of the film The Sterile Cuckoo. The recording of "The Wonder of You" was the same recording as was included in the album of the same name.

The August 8, 1970 issue of Billboard Magazine reviewed the album:

The title tune put the smooth trio way up the singles chart, and is now spotlighted in this exceptional program which also features their new single, "Santo Domingo." Also included in this highly commercial package are top readings of "A Song of Joy," "Where There's a Heartache," and the film theme of "Beyond the Valley of the Dolls."

Another single release from the LP, "Free to Carry On," was also a chart hit, reaching #94 in the U.S. and #11 on the Easy Listening chart. It did best in Canada, where it reached #1 on the Adult Contemporary chart.

The catalog numbers were SP 4262 in the U.S. and Canada, and AMLS 99 in the U.K. Other international releases included Argentina (A&M 5133 6133, titled Ven El Sabado A La Mañana), Australia (World Record Club S-5488, different cover), Germany (A&M SP 4262), Italy (A&M SLAM 47.008), Japan (A&M AML-75), Mexico (A&M AMS-1053), Taiwan (Hua Sheng KHS-4266), and Venezuela (A&M LPS-77.675).

The album was reissued in 1979 on the Pickwick label with a different back cover photo and a history of the group by Jeff Beegle.

== Track listing ==
Side One

1. "Santo Domingo" (Rudi Lindt/Peter Poll/Michael Piano) - 2:48
2. "The Long and Winding Road" (Lennon–McCartney) - 3:48
3. "Free to Carry On" (Jim Brady/Dale Bobbitt) - 2:45
4. "A Song of Joy" (Miguel Ríos) - 4:22
5. "Where There's a Heartache" (Burt Bacharach/Hal David) - 2:47
6. "(He's Got the) Whole World In His Hands" (Traditional, Arr. & Adpt. Bob Alcivar) - 3:50

Side Two

1. "The Drifter" (Paul Williams/Roger Nichols) - 2:40
2. "Sound of Love" (Barry Gibb, Robin Gibb, Maurice Gibb) - 3:30
3. "Autumn Afternoon" (Dick & Don Addrisi) - 3:40
4. "Come Saturday Morning" (Fred Karlin/Dory Previn) - 3:00
5. "The Wonder of You" (Baker Knight) - 2:38
6. "Beyond the Valley of the Dolls" (Stu Phillips/Bob Stone) - 3:09

== Musicians ==
- The Sandpipers are: Michael Piano, Jim Brady and Richard Shoff

Instrumentation by select members of The Wrecking Crew

- Hal Blaine: Drums
- Joe Osborn: Bass
- Larry Knechtel: Piano, Organ
- Jimmy Rowles: Piano
- Dennis Budimir: Electric Guitar
- Mike Anthony & Tommy Tedesco: Rhythm Guitar
- Larry Bunker: Percussion
- The Bill Holman Orchestra
- Solo Voices (not listed on some printings): Patrice Holloway, Carolyn Willis, Susan Tallman

== Production ==
- Produced and arranged by Bob Alcivar except "Come Saturday Morning" and "The Wonder of You" produced by Allen Stanton/Arranged by Nick De Caro
- Engineer: Ray Gerhardt
- Production Assistants: Shelley Gordon, Jill Sheridan, Ruth
- Album Art Direction: Tom Wilkes
- Album Photography: Jim McCrary

== Reissues ==
The LP was reissued in 1979 by Pickwick Records on vinyl and cassette tape. This edition added a biographical liner note about the band, but changed the song order and omitted three songs ("Santo Domingo," "(He's Got the) Whole World In His Hands" and "Beyond the Valley of the Dolls"). The only compact disc reissue of the LP to date was a Japanese version, now out of print.
