= Tom Wilkes =

American art designer (1939–2009)

Thomas Edward Wilkes (July 30, 1939 – June 28, 2009) was an American art director, designer, photographer, illustrator, writer and producer-director.

== Life ==
Wilkes was born in Long Beach, California and raised in southern California. Wilkes attended Long Beach City College, UCLA, and the Art Center College of Design in the 1950s and 1960s.

In 1967 Wilkes was the art director of the Monterey Pop Festival. From 1967 through 1969, he was the art director of A&M Records. He was a partner with Barry Feinstein in Camouflage Productions from 1970 through 1973, and a partner in Wilkes & Braun, Inc. from 1973 through 1974. In late 1974 and early in 1975, Tom was a partner and creative director in Hot M Productions along with David Lear, Drake Morton and Merrick Morton. He was art director of ABC Records from 1975 through 1977, and in 1978 he started Tom Wilkes Productions and became president of Project Interspeak, a nonprofit corporation.

Wilkes was responsible for scores of award-winning designs. In the Grammy Awards of 1974, he received a Grammy Award for Best Recording Package for Tommy performed by the London Symphony Orchestra and English Chamber Choir. In addition to creating hundreds of posters, logos, books, trade ads and illustrations, Wilkes designed such significant covers as the "invitation" iteration of the Rolling Stones' Beggars Banquet; George Harrison's All Things Must Pass and The Concert for Bangladesh; Cheech & Chong's Big Bambu; and Neil Young's Harvest and Homegrown. Wilkes also produced and directed TV and radio spots, music videos, films, mixed media presentations and special events.

The two Beatles compilation albums released in 1973, 1962–1966 and 1967–1970 (also known as the Red and Blue Albums), were designed by Wilkes. His name was shown (only on the US versions of these albums) in the bottom left-hand corner of the paper sleeve (side four) for housing the vinyl record.

== Album cover credits ==
- 1967 Flowers, the Rolling Stones (original graphics)
- 1967 Present Tense, Sagittarius (cover design)
- 1967 Happy Together, The Turtles (cover design)
- 1967 Safe as Milk, Captain Beefheart and the Magic Band (graphic design)
- 1967 The Sandpipers, The Sandpipers (cover photography)
- 1967 Misty Roses, The Sandpipers (art director)
- 1968 Outta Season, Ike & Tina Turner (art director)
- 1968 Beggars Banquet, the Rolling Stones (design, original design concept)
- 1968 Recital, Lee Michaels (design)
- 1968 Carnival of Life, Lee Michaels (art direction)
- 1968 Christmas Album, Herb Alpert & the Tijuana Brass (art direction)
- 1968 Colours, Claudine Longet (art direction)
- 1968 The Family That Plays Together, Spirit (art direction)
- 1968 Fantastic Expedition of Dillard & Clark, Dillard & Clark (art direction)
- 1968 Fool on the Hill, Sérgio Mendes & Brasil '66 (art direction)
- 1968 I Wonder What She's Doing Tonite?, Tommy Boyce & Bobby Hart (art direction)
- 1968 Love Is Blue, Claudine Longet (art direction)
- 1968 Roger Nichols & the Small Circle of Friends, Roger Nichols & the Small Circle of Friends (art direction)
- 1968 Song Cycle, Van Dyke Parks (illustrations)
- 1968 Spirit, Spirit (art direction)
- 1968 Tape From California, Phil Ochs (art direction)
- 1968 Tarantula, Tarantula (design, photography)
- 1968 Softly, the Sandpipers (art director)
- 1969 Accept No Substitute, the Original Delaney & Bonnie (graphic design)
- 1969 Any Way That You Want Me, Evie Sands (art direction, photography, cover photo)
- 1969 Clear, Spirit (design)
- 1969 Crystal Illusions, Sérgio Mendes & Brasil '66 (art direction)
- 1969 Dylan's Gospel, the Brothers and Sisters of L.A. (photography)
- 1969 The Gilded Palace of Sin, the Flying Burrito Brothers (art direction)
- 1969 Happy Heart, Nick DeCaro & Orchestra (art direction)
- 1969 It's Never Too Late, the Montgomery Brothers (design, photography)
- 1969 Lee Michaels, Lee Michaels (art direction)
- 1969 Love Is All We Have to Give, the Checkmates, Ltd. (graphic design, photography)
- 1969 Make It Easy on Yourself, Burt Bacharach (art direction)
- 1969 Rehearsals for Retirement, Phil Ochs (art direction, photography)
- 1969 Robin Wilson, Robin Wilson (art direction)
- 1969 Rock Salt & Nails, Steve Young (art direction)
- 1969 Through the Morning, Through the Night, Dillard & Clark (art direction)
- 1969 Spanish Album, the Sandpipers (art director)
- 1969 The Wonder of You, the Sandpipers (art direction/cover photography)
- 1969 Ticket to Ride, the Carpenters (art direction)
- 1969 Venus in Cancer, Robbie Basho (design, photography)
- 1969 Ye-Me-Le, Sérgio Mendes & Brasil '66 (art direction)
- 1969 Signs of the Zodiac, Mort Garson (art direction)
- 1970 A Bad Donato, Donato (design, photography)
- 1970 Alone Together, Dave Mason (design, photography)
- 1970 Barrel, Lee Michaels (art direction, photography)
- 1970 Buddy and the Juniors, Buddy Guy w/ Junior Wells & Junior Mance (design, photography)
- 1970 Burrito Deluxe, the Flying Burrito Brothers (art direction)
- 1970 Close to You, the Carpenters (art direction)
- 1970 Contribution, Shawn Phillips (art direction)
- 1970 Eric Clapton, Eric Clapton (design, photography)
- 1970 Greatest Hits, Phil Ochs (art direction, photography, back cover)
- 1970 Leon Russell, Leon Russell (design)
- 1970 Mad Dogs & Englishmen, Joe Cocker (design)
- 1970 On Tour with Eric Clapton, Delaney & Bonnie & Friends (design, photography)
- 1970 To Bonnie from Delaney, Delaney & Bonnie (design, photography)
- 1970 All Things Must Pass, George Harrison (design)
- 1970 Wonderful World, Beautiful People, Jimmy Cliff (art direction)
- 1970 Second Spanish Album, the Sandpipers (art director)
- 1970 Come Saturday Morning, the Sandpipers (art direction)
- 1971 Cello Quartet, Roger Kellaway Cello Quartet (design, photography)
- 1971 John Prine, John Prine (design, photography)
- 1971 Live at Fillmore West, King Curtis (design)
- 1971 Minnows, Marc Benno (design, photography)
- 1971 Motel Shot, Delaney & Bonnie (photography, jacket design)
- 1971 Off the Shelf, Batdorf & Rodney (design, photography)
- 1971 The Concert for Bangladesh, George Harrison & Friends (design, photography)
- 1971 Pearl, Janis Joplin (design, photography)
- 1971 Someday Man, Paul Williams (design, photography)
- 1971 Stoney End, Barbra Streisand (design, photography)
- 1971 Thirds, the James Gang (cover design)
- 1971 Watcha' Gonna Do?, Denny Doherty (design, photography)
- 1972 Stoneground Words, Melanie (design, photography)
- 1972 Dinnertime, Alex Taylor (design, photography)
- 1972 Dr. John's Gumbo, Dr. John (design, photography)
- 1972 FM & AM, George Carlin (production art)
- 1972 Harvest, Neil Young (design)
- 1972 Jo Jo Gunne, Jo Jo Gunne (design, cover photo)
- 1972 Steamin', Rastus (cover photo)
- 1972 Tommy - As Performed by the London Symphony Orchestra and English Chamber Choir with Guest Soloists (design, photography)
- 1972 Big Bambu, Cheech and Chong (jacket/poster design)
- 1972 Ululu, Jesse Ed Davis (design, photography)
- 1973 Witness, Spooky Tooth (design, photography)
- 1973 1962–1966, The Beatles (album, design)
- 1973 1967–1970, The Beatles (album, design)
- 1973 Living in the Material World, George Harrison (design)
- 1974 Stop All That Jazz, Leon Russell (design)
- 1974 Dark Horse, George Harrison (design)
- 1975 Mysteries, Keith Jarrett (art direction)
- 1975 Those Southern Knights, The Crusaders (art direction)
- 1976 Groove-A-Thon, Isaac Hayes (art direction)
- 1976 I Hope We Get to Love in Time, Marilyn McCoo & Billy Davis Jr. (artwork)
- 1976 Illusions, Jimmy Ponder (art direction)
- 1976 Long May You Run, the Stills-Young Band (design)
- 1976 Rose of Cimarron, Poco (art direction, design)
- 1976 Shake Some Action, the Flamin' Groovies (art direction)
- 1976 Texas Rock For Country Rollers, Sir Doug & the Texas Tornados (art direction, photography)
- 1976 Together Again...Live, Bobby Bland & B.B. King (art direction)
- 1976 Decade, Neil Young (design, cover photo)
- 1977 Sail Boat, Jonathan Edwards (graphic design, photography)
- 1978 You Can Tune a Piano, But You Can't Tuna Fish, REO Speedwagon (art direction, design, photography, cover design)
- 1979 Blue Kentucky Girl, Emmylou Harris (design, photography)
- 1981 Strait Country, George Strait (photography)
- 1989 Roadrunner, Smith Sisters (design, photography)
- 1989 Starr Struck: Best of Ringo Starr, Vol. 2, Ringo Starr (art direction)
- 1994 Hugh Masekela & the Union of South Africa, Hugh Masekela (design, photography)
- 1995 Strait Out of the Box, George Strait (photography)
- 1996 Loneliness & Temptation/A Heart Full of Song, Clarence Carter (photography)
- 1996 Persimmons, Jim Lauderdale (artwork, art direction, design, photography)
- 1996 Portraits, Emmylou Harris (photography)
- 1996 Victim of Life's Circumstances/Genuine Cowhide, Delbert McClinton (art direction)
- 1997 Farewells & Fantasies, Phil Ochs (photography)
- 1999 Box of Pearls: The Janis Joplin Collection, Janis Joplin (design, photography)
- 1999 The Little David Years: 1971-1977, George Carlin (design, photography)
- 2000 Asylum Recordings: Jo Jo Gunne + Bite Down Hard, Jo Jo Gunne (design, photography)
- 2000 Collection, Janis Joplin (design, photography)
- 2000 Lone Star Beer & Bob Wills Music/For All Our Cowboy Friends, Red Steagall (art direction, photography)
- 2001 Notice to Appear/A Banquet in Blues, John Mayall (art direction)
- 2001 Fantastic Expedition of Dillard & Clark, Dillard & Clark (art direction)
- 2001 Stained Glass Reflections: Anthology, 1960–1970, Scott McKenzie (design, photography)
- 2002 From the Inside/A Good Feelin' to Know, Poco (design, photography)
- 2003 Child of Clay/Windmills of Your Mind, Jimmie F. Rodgers (art direction, photography)
- 2004 Blue Kentucky Girl [Bonus Tracks], Emmylou Harris (design, photography)
- 2004 Jackie...Plus, Jackie DeShannon (design, photography)
- 2004 Pieces of the Sky [Bonus Tracks], Emmylou Harris (design, photography)
- 2005 Alone Together/Headkeeper, Dave Mason (design, photography)
- 2005 The Beat of the Brass [Deluxe Edition], Herb Alpert & the Tijuana Brass (art direction)
- 2005 Chronicles, The Carpenters (art direction)
- 2005 The Concert for Bangladesh (DVD), George Harrison and Friends (photography, original design concept)
- 2005 Don't Fight the Feeling, Aretha Franklin/King Curtis (design)
- 2005 You Can Sing on the Left or Bark on the Right [Bonus Tracks], Dirk Hamilton (art direction)]
- 2006 Bust Out at Full Speed: The Sire Years, Flamin' Groovies (art direction)
- 2006 Flowers [Japan], the Rolling Stones (graphic design)
- 2006 Home [Bonus Tracks], Delaney & Bonnie (cover design)
- 2006 Live at Fillmore West [Deluxe], King Curtis (design)
- 2006 Live at Fillmore West, Aretha Franklin (design)
- 2006 Misty Roses/The Wonder of You (CD reissue), The Sandpipers (art direction)
- 2007 Monterey Pop Festival, Various Artists (logo design)
- 2020 Homegrown, Neil Young (artwork, originally 1975)

== Notable contributions ==
=== Monterey Pop Festival ===
Wilkes was art director for the Monterey International Pop Festival in 1967. Monterey was the first widely promoted rock festival in the world, and subject of an acclaimed documentary movie entitled Monterey Pop by D. A. Pennebaker.

Wilkes designed all the print material for the festival, including the 80-page program book.

=== The Concert for Bangladesh ===
Detail from Wilkes's cover for The Concert for Bangladesh

Album package, photography and design for George Harrison and Friends' Concert for Bangladesh album (1971) was provided by Tom Wilkes and Barry Feinstein for Camouflage Productions. Wilkes also provided design and photography for the subsequent Apple Films movie release. In 2005, he contributed to the documentary The Concert for Bangladesh Revisited with George Harrison and Friends, as part of the DVD release for the concert film.

For the album's front cover, Wilkes used a confronting image showing a naked child beside an empty food bowl, in an effort to bring home to record-buyers the plight of the refugees of the Bangladesh Liberation War. In his book on the Beatles' Apple Records releases, author Bruce Spizer describes the cover as "haunting". Spizer writes: "In selecting the photo, Wilkes wanted a picture that would generate sympathy without being overly horrific ... Wilkes's design is a simple but highly effective logo that drives home the point of what motivated the concert." According to Jonathan Taplin, who served as production manager at the Concert for Bangladesh, Apple distributor Capitol Records were concerned that the image was not commercial enough, but Harrison was resolute that Wilkes's cover should be used.

In 2004, Wilkes discussed this cover image, and his involvement in Harrison's aid project, with journalist Matt Hurwitz of Goldmine magazine:

Hurwitz: "So on to The Concert for Bangla Desh (1971), which is a beautiful cover, certainly one of your top pieces. Where did the cover photo of the child come from?"
Wilkes: "This is an AP or UPI released picture of a starving child... I did extensive airbrushing and then did this design, this presentation of it. I kind of cleaned it up a little. I spent hours looking at horrible, horrible footage, and we eventually selected this shot. Some of the other photos in the book are from the rest of the film footage I reviewed. It was difficult to watch. We just took stills from the film."

Hurwitz: [Wilkes displays a 1-inch high pewter medallion of the boy on this front cover, framed in the arched outline.] "Where did this come from?"
Wilkes: "We did Bangla Desh gratis for them. We did it just because we wanted to contribute to George's cause, so we just worked on expenses. He flew us to New York [for the two concerts at Madison Square Garden]. We did all the photography, on the stage, and we put the whole package together. George gave these, as a little present, to everybody who donated their time. I also have a really nice letter from UNICEF thanking me, which was really great."

=== Tommy and Grammy Award ===
Wilkes along with his partner, Craig Braun, was awarded [Grammy Awards ] by NARAS in 1973 as art director for the 1972 Ode Records' version of Tommy as performed by the London Symphony Orchestra and English Chamber Choir with Guest Soloists.
