= A Gift of Song =

A Gift of Song may refer to:

- Music for UNICEF Concert, subtitled A Gift of Song, a benefit concert held in the United Nations General Assembly
- A Gift of Song (The Sandpipers album)

== See also ==
- Gift of Song, a 1970 album by Judith Durham
