= Softly (The Sandpipers album) =

Studio album by The Sandpipers
- Released: August 1968
- Studio: A&M (Hollywood, California)
- Genre: Pop/Rock
- Label: A&M SP-4147
- Producer: Tommy LiPuma

The Sandpipers chronology
Misty Roses (1967)	Softly (1968)	Spanish Album (1969)

Softly was an LP album featuring The Sandpipers, released by A&M Records in August, 1968. The album reached #180 on the Billboard chart. Two singles from the album charted in the top 40 on the Billboard Adult Contemporary chart: "Quando M'Innamoro" at #16 and the title track at #39.

The album was the first Sandpipers album to be issued in stereo only and not in monaural form in the United States; the catalog numbers were SP-4147 in the US and Canada, and AML-918 in the United Kingdom. Other international releases included Australia (A&M SAML-932,987), Brazil (A&M SP 4194), Germany (A&M 212 043), Israel (A&M 212043), New Zealand (A&M SAML-932987), Spain (A&M HDAS 371-22), Taiwan (Thia Sun KHS-4199), and Venezuela (A&M LPS 77326).

== Track listing ==
Side One

1. Softly (Gordon Lightfoot) 2:30
2. Find a Reason to Believe (Tim Hardin) 2:04
3. Back on the Street Again (Steve Gillette) 1:55
4. Love Is Blue (L’Amour Est Bleu) (Brian Blackburn/André Popp/Pierre Cour) 1:55
5. Canción De Amor (Wanderlove) (Mason Williams/C. Mapel) 3:45
6. Quando M'Innamoro (Roberto Livraghi/Daniele Pace/Mario Panzeri) 3:05

Side Two

1. Jennifer Juniper (Donovan Leitch) 2:40
2. All My Loving (Lennon–McCartney)
3. Ojos De España (Spanish Eyes) (Bert Kaempfert/Eddie Snyder/Charlie Singleton)
4. To Put Up With You (Paul Williams/Roger Nichols) 2:45
5. Suzanne (Leonard Cohen) 4:35
6. Gloria Patri (Gregorian Psalm Tone III) 0:21

The 8-track tape release (AM 8147) had a different track order: A1-A3-A5, A2-A4-B3, A6-B1-B2, B4-B5-B6.

== Production ==
- Producer: Tommy LiPuma
- Arrangers: Bob Thompson, Nick DeCaro
- Recording Engineer: Henry Lewy
- Mixing Engineer: Dick Bogert
- Album Design: Corporate Head
- Art Director: Tom Wilkes
- Photography: Guy Webster
