= The Moviegoer (album) =

Studio album by Scott Walker
- Released: October 1972
- Recorded: Summer 1972
- Genres: Easy listening; pop
- Length: 38:00
- Labels: Philips; Contour (1975 re-release)
- Producer: John Franz

Scott Walker chronology
'Til the Band Comes In (1970)	The Moviegoer (1972)	Any Day Now (1973)

Alternative cover
- 1975 Contour reissue

The Moviegoer is the seventh solo studio album by the American singer Scott Walker. It was released in October 1972 but failed to chart. No singles were released from the album, though "This Way Mary" was later released as a b-side to Walker's 1973 single "The Me I Never Knew". The album consists solely of renditions of film theme songs originally performed by other artists.

The Moviegoer was the first of six consecutive albums (the last two as The Walker Brothers) in which Walker did not contribute any original material. Having lost creative control of his music after the commercial failures of his previous two albums, Scott 4 and 'Til the Band Comes In, Walker was tasked with recording "inoffensive, middle-of-the-road material that could be easily processed, marketed and sold". By way of compromise, Walker had some say in the song selection and drew together a selection of themes from some of his favourite films.

The album was recorded quickly in the summer of 1972 with Walker's usual studio team consisting of producer Johnny Franz and engineer Peter J. Olliff. In a change from previous work, Robert Cornford was brought-in to produce the orchestral arrangements. Despite a push for commercial viability the album received negative reviews when released as an LP in October 1972. The album was reissued in 1975 by Contour record label with new sleeve art. The album has since been deleted and has never been reissued.

In Japan, the album was released under the title The Impossible Dream (The Moviegoer) with a different sleeve, an altered running order and the inclusion of "The Impossible Dream" in place of "Easy Come Easy Go".

== Availability ==
The continued unavailability of The Moviegoer is due to Walker's dissatisfaction with the album and its three successors - Any Day Now (1973), Stretch (1973) and We Had It All (1974) - as well as 1969's Scott Walker Sings Songs from his T.V. Series, all of which were made up entirely of cover versions and which he describes in the documentary Scott Walker: 30 Century Man as his "wilderness years". Walker later blocked ...T.V. Series, The Moviegoer and Any Day Now from being released on CD, while Stretch and We Had It All were released on CD in 1997 by an independent label without Walker's own approval.

In spite of the album's deletion, the majority of the songs were released on Scott Walker compilation CDs during the 2000s. "Glory Road", "The Summer Knows", and "The Ballad of Sacco and Vanzetti" are included on the 2003 5 Easy Pieces box set, while "Loss Of Love", "Come Saturday Morning", "That Night", "This Way Mary", "A Face In The Crowd", "Speak Softly Love" and "Easy Come Easy Go" can be found on 2005's Classics & Collectibles. Only "Joe Hill" and "All His Children" remain unavailable.

== Reception ==
Professional ratings
Review scores
Source	Rating
Allmusic	2/5 stars

In common with Walker's 1970s output, The Moviegoer was poorly received by critics but has been reassessed since Walker was critically reappraised in the decades following The Walker Brothers' 1978 album Nite Flights. In their Walker biography A Deep Shade of Blue, Mike Watkinson and Pete Anderson recommend the album to only the most die-hard of Scott Walker fans, but cite "The Ballad of Sacco and Vanzetti" as the album's undoubted highlight for its Spaghetti-Western feel vaguely reminiscent of "The Seventh Seal" from Scott 4.

Stephen Thomas Erlewine writing retrospectively for Allmusic summarises The Moviegoer as a "harmless mainstream pop album [delivered] without much care".

== Track listing ==
Side one
No.	Title	Writer(s)	Length
1.	"This Way Mary" (Theme from Mary, Queen of Scots)	John Barry, Don Black	2:30
2.	"Speak Softly Love" (Love theme from The Godfather)	Nino Rota, Larry Kusik	3:50
3.	"Glory Road" (Theme from W.U.S.A.)	Neil Diamond	3:32
4.	"That Night" (Theme from The Fox)	Lalo Schifrin, Norman Gimbel	2:50
5.	"The Summer Knows" (Theme from Summer of '42)	Michel Legrand, Alan Bergman, Marilyn Bergman	3:30
6.	"The Ballad of Sacco and Vanzetti (Here's to You)" (Theme from Sacco and Vanzetti)	Joan Baez, Ennio Morricone	3:32

Side two
No.	Title	Writer(s)	Length
7.	"A Face in the Crowd" (Theme from Le Mans)	Michel Legrand, Alan Bergman, Marilyn Bergman	3:22
8.	"Joe Hill" (Theme from The Ballad of Joe Hill)	Stefan Grossman	2:22
9.	"Loss of Love" (Theme from Sunflower)	Henry Mancini, Bob Merrill	3:07
10.	"All His Children" (Theme from Never Give an Inch)	Henry Mancini, Alan Bergman, Marilyn Bergman	2:51
11.	"Come Saturday Morning" (Theme from Pookie)	Fred Karlin, Dory Previn	3:34
12.	"Easy Come Easy Go" (Theme from They Shoot Horses, Don't They?)	Johnny Green, Edward Heyman	3:00

Japan track listing

Side one
No.	Title	Writer(s)	Length
1.	"The Ballad of Sacco and Vanzetti (Here's to You)" (Theme from Sacco and Vanzetti)	Joan Baez, Ennio Morricone	3:32
2.	"Loss of Love" (Theme from Sunflower)	Henry Mancini, Bob Merrill	3:07
3.	"This Way Mary" (Theme from Mary, Queen of Scots)	John Barry, Don Black	2:30
4.	"Glory Road" (Theme from W.U.S.A.)	Neil Diamond	3:32
5.	"That Night" (Theme from The Fox)	Lalo Schifrin, Norman Gimbel	2:50
6.	"The Summer Knows" (Theme from Summer of '42)	Michel Legrand, Alan Bergman, Marilyn Bergman	3:30

Side two
No.	Title	Writer(s)	Length
7.	"Speak Softly Love" (Love theme from The Godfather)	Nino Rota	3:50
8.	"A Face in the Crowd" (Theme from Le Mans)	Michel Legrand, Alan Bergman, Marilyn Bergman	3:22
9.	"Joe Hill" (Theme from The Ballad of Joe Hill)	Stefan Grossman	2:22
10.	"All His Children" (Theme from Never Give an Inch)	Henry Mancini, Alan Bergman, Marilyn Bergman	2:51
11.	"Come Saturday Morning" (Theme from Pookie)	Fred Karlin, Dory Previn	3:34
12.	"The Impossible Dream" (Theme from Man of La Mancha)	Mitch Leigh, Joe Darion	3:00

== Personnel ==
- Scott Walker – Vocals
- Johnny Franz – Producer
- Peter J. Olliff – Engineering
- Robert Cornford – Orchestra director

== Release history ==
Region	Date	Label	Format	Catalogue
United Kingdom	October 1972	Philips	LP	6308 120
Japan	October 1972	Philips	LP	SFX-5052
United Kingdom	October 1972	Philips	Cassette	7108 076
United Kingdom	1975	Contour	LP	6870 633
