= Tommy Tedesco =

American guitarist and studio musician (1930–1997)

- Tedesco in 1979

Background information
- Born: Thomas Joseph Tedesco; July 3, 1930; Niagara Falls, New York, U.S.
- Origin: Los Angeles
- Died: November 10, 1997 (aged 67) Northridge, California, U.S.
- Genres: Jazz fusion; rock; pop; soundtrack
- Occupations: Musician; composer; teacher
- Instrument: Guitar
- Years active: 1950s–1992
- Labels: Discovery Records; Capri Records
- Formerly of: The Wrecking Crew

Thomas Joseph Tedesco (July 3, 1930 – November 10, 1997) was an American guitarist and studio musician in Los Angeles and Hollywood. He was part of the loose collective of the area's leading session musicians later popularly known as the Wrecking Crew, who played on thousands of studio recordings in the 1960s and 1970s, including several hundred Top 40 hits.

Tedesco's playing credits include the theme from television's Bonanza, The Twilight Zone, Vic Mizzy's theme from Green Acres, M*A*S*H, Batman, and Elvis Presley's '68 Comeback Special. He was shown on-camera in many game shows and comedies. He played ex-con guitarist Tommy Marinucci, a member of Happy Kyne's Mirth-Makers, in Fernwood 2 Night a talk-show spoof (1977–1978) and America 2-Night, a continuation of the series.

== Career ==
Born in Niagara Falls, New York, Tedesco moved to the West Coast where he became one of the most-sought-after studio musicians between the 1960s and 1980s. Although he was primarily a guitar player, he played mandolin, ukulele, sitar, and over twenty other stringed instruments.

Guitar Player said Tedesco was the most recorded guitarist in history, having played on thousands of recordings, many of which were top 20 hits. He recorded with most of the top musicians working in the Los Angeles area including the Beach Boys, the Mamas & the Papas, the Everly Brothers, the Association, Barbra Streisand, Jan and Dean, the 5th Dimension, Elvis Presley, Sam Cooke, Ella Fitzgerald, Frank Zappa, Ricky Nelson, Cher, and Nancy and Frank Sinatra in addition to performing on Richard Harris' classic "MacArthur Park". Tedesco's performed on Jack Nitzsche's "The Lonely Surfer", Wayne Newton's version of "Danke Schoen", B. Bumble and the Stingers's "Nut Rocker", the Rip Chords' "Hey Little Cobra", the Ronettes' "Be My Baby", the Sandpipers' "Guantanamera", the T-Bones' "No Matter What Shape'", and Nino Tempo & April Stevens' version of "Deep Purple". For Guitar Player, Tedesco wrote a regular column called "Studio Log" where he chronicled a day's work recording a movie, TV show or album, the special challenges each job posed and how he solved them, what instruments he used, and how much money he made on the job.

Tedesco also performed on film soundtracks including The French Connection, The Godfather, Jaws, The Deer Hunter, Field of Dreams, and Gloria as well as several Elvis Presley films. Tedesco was the guitarist for the Original Roxy cast of The Rocky Horror Show. He performed the opening guitar solo for the Howard Hawks and John Wayne film Rio Lobo. Tedesco was one of few sidemen credited for work on animated cartoons for The Ant and the Aardvark cartoons (1968–1971). As a solo artist, he recorded jazz guitar albums, but his musical career ended in 1992 when he suffered a stroke which resulted in partial paralysis. In 1993, he published an autobiography, Confessions of a Guitar Player.

Tedesco died of lung cancer in 1997, at the age of 67, in Northridge, California. His son, Denny (other relatives are Damon and Suzie Greene Tedesco) directed the 2008 documentary film The Wrecking Crew, which features interviews with Tommy Tedesco and many of his fellow session musicians. The film finally was released in theaters in 2015, after musical rights were cleared. Before then it had been only screened at film festivals, where clearance rights are not required.

== Awards ==
In 2017, Tommy Tedesco was posthumously inducted into the Niagara Falls Music Hall of Fame.

== Discography ==
=== As leader ===
- The Electric Twelve-String Guitar (Imperial Records, 1964)
- The Guitars of Tommy Tedesco (Imperial, 1965)
- Calypso Soul (Imperial, 1966)
- With Love from the 50 Guitars (Musicor, 1977)
- Autumn (Trend, 1978)
- When Do We Start (Discovery Records, 1978)
- Alone at Last (Trend, 1979)
- Thomas Tedesco and Ocean (Nimbus West, 1982)
- Carnival Time (Discovery, 1983)
- Hollywood Gypsy (Discovery, 1986)
- My Desiree (Discovery, 1989)
- Fine Fretted Friend (Discovery, 1992)
- Tommy Tedesco Performs Roumanis' Jazz Rhapsody for Guitar & Orchestra (Capri, 1992)

=== As sideman ===
With Paul Anka

- The Music Man (United Artists, 1977)

With Hoyt Axton

- Saturday's Child (Horizon Records, 1963)

With Joan Baez

- Gracias a la Vida (A&M Records, 1974)

With Chet Baker

- Blood, Chet and Tears (Verve Records, 1970)

With The Beach Boys

- The Beach Boys Today! (Capitol Records, 1965)
- 20/20 (Capitol, 1969)
- 15 Big Ones (Reprise Records, 1976)

With Stephen Bishop

- Careless (ABC, 1976)

With J. J. Cale

- Shades (Island Records, 1981)

With Terry Callier

- Turn You to Love (Elektra Records, 1979)

With David Cassidy

- Cherish (Bell Records, 1972)

With Bill Conti

- Gloria (Columbia, 1980)

With Sam Cooke

- Twistin' the Night Away (RCA Victor, 1962)
- Mr. Soul (RCA Victor, 1963)

With The Crystals

- Twist Uptown (Philles Records, 1963)

With Bobby Darin

- Venice Blue (Capitol, 1965)

With Jackie DeShannon

- Jackie DeShannon (Liberty Records, 1963)

With Neil Diamond

- Serenade (Columbia Records, 1974)

With The 5th Dimension

- Up – Up and Away (Soul City Records, 1967)
- The Magic Garden (Soul City, 1968)
- Stoned Soul Picnic (Soul City, 1968)
- The Age of Aquarius (Soul City, 1969)
- Living Together, Growing Together (Bell, 1973)

With Don Ellis

- Haiku (MPS Records, 1974)

With Aretha Franklin

- Laughing on the Outside (Columbia, 1963)

With Michael Franks

- Michael Franks (Brut Records, 1973)

With Ace Frehley

- Second Sighting (Atlantic Records, 1987)

With Art Garfunkel

- Angel Clare (Columbia, 1973)

With Gale Garnett

- Gale Garnett Sings About Flying and Rainbows and Love and Other Groovy Things (RCA Victor, 1967)

With Richard Harris

- A Tramp Shining (Dunhill Records, 1968)

With Johnny Hartman

- I Love Everybody (ABC, 1967)

With Jan and Dean

- Surf City and Other Swingin' Cities (Liberty, 1963)

With Quincy Jones

- The Hot Rock OST (Prophesy, 1972)

With Al Kooper

- Easy Does It (Columbia, 1970)

With Peggy Lee

- Latin ala Lee! (Capitol, 1960)
- Mirrors (A&M, 1975)

With Kenny Loggins

- Celebrate Me Home (Columbia, 1977)

With The Mamas & the Papas

- The Mamas & the Papas (Dunhill, 1966)

With Hugh Masekela

- Herb Alpert / Hugh Masekela (Horizon, 1978)

With Roger McGuinn

- Peace on You (Columbia, 1974)

With The Monkees

- Instant Replay (Colgems Records, 1969)

With Maria Muldaur

- Waitress in the Donut Shop (Reprise, 1974)

With Walter Murphy

- Discosymphony (New York International, 1979)

With Anne Murray

- Together (Capitol, 1975)

With Michael Nesmith

- The Wichita Train Whistle Sings (Dot Records, 1968)

With Randy Newman

- Randy Newman (Reprise, 1968)

With Harry Nilsson

- Harry (RCA Victor, 1969)

With Jack Nitzsche

- Heart Beat (Soundtrack) (Capitol, 1980)

With Van Dyke Parks

- Song Cycle (Warner Bros. Records, 1967)

With Billy Preston

- Greazee Soul (Soul City, 1963)

With Minnie Riperton

- Stay in Love (Epic, 1977)

With Johnny Rivers

- Changes (Imperial, 1966)

With Linda Ronstadt

- What's New (Asylum, 1983)

With Leon Russell

- Looking Back (Olympic, 1973)

With The Sandpipers

- Come Saturday Morning (A&M, 1970)
- A Gift of Song (A&M, 1971)

With Lalo Schifrin

- The Cincinnati Kid (soundtrack) (MGM, 1965)
- Music from Mission: Impossible (Dot, 1967)
- More Mission: Impossible (Paramount, 1968)
- Mannix (Paramount, 1968)
- The Fox (soundtrack) (MGM, 1968)
- Che! (soundtrack) (Tetragrammaton, 1969)
- Kelly's Heroes (soundtrack) (MGM, 1970)
- Enter the Dragon (soundtrack) (Warner Bros. Records, 1973)

With Frank Sinatra

- Softly, as I Leave You (Reprise, 1964)
- That's Life (Reprise, 1966)
- Sinatra & Company (Reprise, 1971)
- Some Nice Things I've Missed (Reprise, 1974)

With Sarah Vaughan

- Sarah Vaughan with Michel Legrand (Mainstream, 1972)

With Lenny Williams

- Love Current (MCA, 1979)

== Bibliography ==
- Tedesco, Tommy (1981). For Guitar Players Only. Alfred Music. ISBN 978-0739053812.
- Tedesco, Tommy (1988). Tommy Tedesco: Anatomy of a Guitar Player. Mel Bay Publications. ISBN 978-1562223526.
- Tedesco, Tommy (1993). Confessions of a Guitar Player. Centerstream Publications. ISBN 978-0931759710.

== Videography ==
- 2008 The Wrecking Crew, a documentary put together by his son Denny Tedesco
