= Overdue =

Overdue may refer to:

- Anything exceeding a time limit
- Overdue (album), a 1977 album by The Sandpipers
- "Overdue" (song), by Metro Boomin featuring Travis Scott
- "Overdue", a song by Muse on the album Showbiz
- "Overdue", a 2006 song by Bitter:Sweet on the album The Mating Game
- "Overdue" (Doctors), a 2004 television episode
