= Spanish Album =

Compilation album by The Sandpipers
- Released: 1969
- Genre: Pop/Rock
- Label: A&M SP 4159 (US); AMLS 926 (UK)
- Producer: Tommy LiPuma

The Sandpipers chronology
Softly (1969)	Spanish Album (1969)	The Wonder of You (1969)

Alternative cover
- Colombia release

Spanish Album was an LP album consisting of tracks from previous albums by The Sandpipers, many with re-recorded vocals in Spanish. Most of the tracks were translations of songs better-known in the United States in English.

The October 26, 1968 issue of Billboard Magazine reviewed the album:

This LP comes as no surprise, because the Sandpipers have consistently relied on Latinesque sounds. The only remarkable thing is that it's so excellent - better than expected. "Cuando Sali de Cuba" is here, as is their old hit of "Guantanamera". "Michelle" and "Yesterday," both in Spanish, are tremendous.

The catalog numbers were SP 4159 in the United States and Canada, and AMLS 926 in the United Kingdom. Other international releases (many with variations on the U.S. cover) included Argentina (A&M A-5013, titled Canción De Amor), Australia (A&M/Summit SRA250-005, different cover), Brazil (A&M 2011), Chile (A&M 30026, titled "Mas Canciones En Castellano"), Colombia (A&M/Codiscos CI-19, titled En Español), Ecuador (A&M LP-880007, titled Cantan En Español), El Salvador (A&M SP-4159), Germany (A&M 212 041, titled Sing In Spanish), India (A&M SP 4159), Japan (A&M AML-27), Mexico (A&M AMS-1004, titled Cantan En Español), New Zealand (Horizon HZ 10), Spain (A&M/Hispavox HDA 371–28, titled Todo En Español), and Venezuela (A&M LPS 77308, titled Cantan En Español). The LP was reissued in 1975 in the UK by A&M/Hamlet (AMLP 8010).

== Track listing ==
Side One

1. "Guantanamera" (Joseíto Fernández) 3:14
2. "La Bamba" (Traditional) 2:45
3. "Extraños en la Noche (Strangers in the Night)" (Kaempfert/Singleton/Snyder) 2:39
4. "Llevame a la Luna (Fly Me to the Moon)" (Bart Howard) 1:50
5. "Cancion de Amor (Wanderlove)" (Mason Williams/C. Mapel) 3:50
6. "Louie, Louie" (Richard Berry) 2:48

Side Two

1. "Cuando Salí de Cuba (The Wind Will Change Tomorrow)" (Luis Aguile) 2:38
2. "Ayer (Yesterday)" (Lennon-McCartney) 2:25
3. "Michelle" (Lennon–McCartney) 2:54
4. "Y la Quiero (And I Love Her)" (Lennon–McCartney) 3:22
5. "Enamorado" (Keith Colley-Paul Rubio) 2:05
6. "Ojos Españoles" (Spanish Eyes) (Kaempfert/Singleton/Snyder) 1:40

== Production ==
- Producer: Tommy LiPuma
- Arrangers: Mort Garson, Bob Thompson, Perry Botkin, Jr., Nick DeCaro
- Recording Engineer: Henry Lewy
- Art Director: Tom Wilkes
- Photography: Guy Webster
