= Scott: Scott Walker Sings Songs from his T.V. Series =

Studio album by Scott Walker
- Released: 20 June 1969
- Recorded: 1969
- Genres: Baroque pop; big band
- Length: 36:24
- Label: Philips
- Producer: John Franz

Scott Walker chronology
Scott 3 (1969)	Scott: Scott Walker Sings Songs from his T.V. Series (1969)	Scott 4 (1969)

Scott: Scott Walker Sings Songs from his T.V. Series is the fourth solo album by American artist Scott Walker. It was released in June 1969 and reached number seven on the UK Albums Chart, his last album to make the top 20. No singles were released from the album, though in some countries outside the UK, Walker's top 20 non-album single "Lights of Cincinnati", which was issued the same month, was included. The album does not include any original compositions by Walker, instead consisting entirely of covers. Walker himself hated the album, calling it "useless". It was deleted by the late 1970s and has never been reissued.

The album is an accompaniment to his BBC TV series Scott. It features studio re-recordings of a selection of music performed on the show and does not feature any original live recordings from the TV show itself.

== Availability ==
The continued unavailability of Scott Walker Sings Songs from his T.V. Series is due to Walker's dissatisfaction with the album and his four albums from 1972's The Moviegoer to 1974's We Had It All, all of which were made up entirely of cover versions and which he describes in the documentary Scott Walker: 30 Century Man as his "wilderness years". Walker later blocked ...T.V. Series, The Moviegoer and Any Day Now (1973) from being released on CD, while Stretch (1973) and We Had It All were released on CD in 1997 by an independent label without Walker's own approval.

In spite of the album's deletion, most of the tracks were included on two Scott Walker compilation CDs issued in the 2000s, the budget-priced The Collection in 2004 and Classics & Collectibles in 2005. "I Have Dreamed," "Country Girl," "When the World Was Young," "Someone to Light Up My Life," "The Impossible Dream," "If She Walked Into My Life," "Who (Will Take My Place)" and "Lost in the Stars" are included on Classics & Collectibles, while "The Look of Love" is included on The Collection. "Will You Still Be Mine," "The Song Is You" and "Only the Young" remain unavailable.

== Reception ==
Professional ratings
Review scores
Source	Rating
AllMusic	3/5 stars

Gordon Coxhill of New Musical Express wrote, "This LP, totally different from anything he's ever done before, is just as creative, just as professional and perhaps more entertaining than his previous works." A less positive review from the staff of Melody Maker stated that Walker "lacks the magic of the big league male singers" and that "he cannot be faulted on his choice of material — he handles some magnificent modern songs — but his slightly nasal singing palls before the record is over."

Michael Beale, reviewing the album for the Evening-Mail, called it a "clever collection" on which Walker sings standards, singling out Peter Knight's accompaniment for full praise and adding that the record would sell impressively. A reviewer for the Sunday Mirror believed the title was description enough for the album, adding that Walker "never turns out a dud performance or chooses a shoddy song", and that readers should buy the album.

Richie Unterberger, writing retrospectively for AllMusic, reviewed the album positively, remarking that Walker sings the heavily orchestrated and middle of the road material extremely well throughout. Despite this, he felt the album was not very representative of what Walker was usually recording at the time, and was certainly not his best work of the period. He concluded that the album was a curiosity that's far less enduring than Walker's other albums of the late '60s and early '70s, only recommended to completist fans of the singer.

== Track listing ==
Side one
No.	Title	Writer(s)	Length
1.	"Will You Still Be Mine"	Matt Dennis, Thomas Adair	2:25
2.	"I Have Dreamed"	Richard Rodgers, Oscar Hammerstein II	2:37
3.	"When the World Was Young"	M. Philippe-Gérard, Angele Vannier, Johnny Mercer	4:01
4.	"Who (Will Take My Place)"	Charles Aznavour, Herbert Kretzmer	3:18
5.	"If She Walked Into My Life"	Jerry Herman	3:55
6.	"The Impossible Dream"	Mitch Leigh, Joe Darion	3:00

Side two
No.	Title	Writer(s)	Length
1.	"The Song Is You"	Jerome Kern, Oscar Hammerstein II	1:45
2.	"The Look of Love"	Burt Bacharach, Hal David	2:31
3.	"Country Girl"	Robert Farnon	3:07
4.	"Someone to Light Up My Life"	Vinicius de Moraes, Antônio Carlos Jobim, Gene Lees	2:12
5.	"Only the Young"	Richard Ahlert, Marvin Fisher	3:13
6.	"Lost in the Stars"	Maxwell Anderson, Kurt Weill	4:20

== Personnel ==
- Scott Walker – vocals
- Peter Knight – accompaniment director
- John Franz – producer
- Peter Olliff – engineer
- Peter Rand – photography
- Linda Glover – design

== Release history ==
Region	Date	Label	Format	Catalogue	Notes
United Kingdom	June 1969	Philips	LP	SBL 7900	
South Africa	1969	Philips	LP	PST 5125	Released under the title: The Lights Of Cincinnati
Netherlands	1969	Philips	LP	844 244 BY	Released under the title: The Impossible Dream

== Charts ==
Chart	Position
UK Albums Chart	7
