= Overdue (album) =

Studio album by The Sandpipers
- Released: 1976
- Genre: Pop/Rock
- Label: Satril Records SATL 4006 (U.K.)

The Sandpipers chronology
| A Gift of Song (1971) | Overdue (1976) | Ay, Ay, Ay, Manila! (1977) |

Alternative cover
- Japan release as Singapore Girl

Overdue was an LP album by The Sandpipers, released by Satril Records in 1976 in the U.K. with catalog number SATL 4006. Other international releases included Australia (RCA VPL1 4048), Brazil (Young 304.1085), Germany (Jupiter 28 654 OT), Japan (Satril YX-7145-SR, different cover, different track order, titled Singapore Girl), New Zealand (RCA VPL1 4048), Philippines (Satril SATL-4006, different cover, different track order), South Africa (Nitty Gritty NGH 1012), Spain (Satril 77-ST1), and Venezuela (Satril LP-S-11501, titled Atrasado). The album was not released in the U.S.

Overdue contained several songs co-written by group member Jim Brady. Original member Richard Shoff returned for the album with Gary Duckworth replacing original member Michael Piano.

Of the three singles released from the album, one, a disco version of "Hang On Sloopy", charted at #32 on the U.K. singles chart. Another track, "You're A Great Way To Fly (Singapore Girl)", was released as a promotional item in 1979 by Singapore Airlines.

== Track listing ==
1. "Hang On Sloopy" (Russell/Farrell) 3:30
2. "I'll Never Love Anyone Anymore" (Andrew/Chiles) 3:45
3. "Broken Slumber"(Brady/Seeburg) 3:15
4. "Island (Without A Name)" (Brady/Bobbitt) 3:12
5. "Skidrow Joe" (Brady/Bobbitt) 3:41
6. "Living Is A Lovin' Thing" (J. Duncan) 2:55
7. "Life Is a Song Worth Singing" (Bell/Creed) 3:12
8. "Crying In The Rain Again" (Coe/Mitchell) 2:57
9. "Moonlight" (L. Andrew) 3:57
10. "Love In Your Heart" (Coe/Mitchell) 2:38
11. "You're A Great Way To Fly (Singapore Girl)" (Bongusto/Hart) 2:41
12. "The Last Time" (Brady/Bobbitt) 3:56

== Production ==
- Producers: Henry Hadaway and The Sandpipers (all tracks except "Singapore Girl" produced by Bongolisto (sic)/Hart/de Walden)
- Arrangers: John Altman, Paul Rodriguez, Colin Dudman
- Vocal Arrangements: Jim Brady & Richard Shoff
- Studio: Recorded at Pye Studios and Zodiac Sound, London (except "The Last Time" recorded at Burbank Studios, California); mixed at Pye Studios and D.J.M Studios, London; mastered at Pye Studios.
- Recording Engineers: Kim Maxwell, Alan Lucas
- Mixing Engineers: Kim Maxwell, John Cooper
- Cutting Engineer: Gordon Vickary
- Musicians: Barry de Sousa (drums), Paul Westwood (bass guitar), Rick Hitchcock (lead & rhythm guitar), Pete Massey (rhythm guitar), Pete Lemer (keyboards), Duncan Kinell (percussion), John Altman (baritone saxophone), Pat Kyle (tenor saxophone), Pete Thoms (trombone), David Spence (trumpet); strings led by Gerry Richards.
- Cover photographs: Chuck Wolff
- Sleeve design/graphics: Rainbow
