= Guantanamera (The Sandpipers album) =

- 1966 US/UK release

Studio album by The Sandpipers
- Released: October 1966
- Recorded: Sunset Sound Recorders, Hollywood, CA
- Genre: Pop/rock
- Label: A&M LP 117/SP 4117
- Producer: Tommy LiPuma

The Sandpipers chronology
Guantanamera (1966)	The Sandpipers (1967)

Alternative cover
- 1970 UK release

Professional ratings
Review scores
Source	Rating
AllMusic	4.5/5 stars

Guantanamera is the debut album by the Sandpipers, released by A&M Records in October 1966. The album reached No. 13 on the Billboard Top LPs chart, while the title track, released as a single, reached No. 9 on the Billboard Hot 100. Dolores Erickson appeared on the front cover which received a Grammy Award nomination for Best Album Cover - Photography.

The October 15, 1966 issue of Billboard magazine reviewed the album:

The "Guantanamera" hit group have a sure-fire sales winner in this, their debut LP which also includes their new single "Louie Louie". Produced by Tommy LiPuma, the album offers a most diversified program of fresh, creative ideas. The smooth blend of voices, backed by the Latin flavored arrangements throughout, makes it an intriguing package.

The U.S. catalog numbers were LP 117 in monaural and SP 4117 in stereo. International releases included Argentina (Fermata 111, titled Los Sandpipers), Australia (A&M SAML 932,128), Canada (A&M LP 117 and SP 4117), Chile (Fermata LF-120, titled "El Mar", different track order), France (A&M 875 030), Germany (London SHA 202 and A&M 212 008), Italy (Derby DBL 8022), Japan (King AML-20), Mexico (A&M printed by Discos Tizoc, TAMM-9017 and TAMS-9017), Netherlands (A&M 540 415), New Zealand (A&M SAML 932128), Spain (A&M HDAS 371-04), Taiwan (First FL-1501 on orange vinyl and Bell Song SWL-1043 on red vinyl), United Kingdom (Pye International NPL.28086), and Venezuela (A&M LPS-77308).

In addition to the 1966 LP released in the UK on the Pye label, a second LP also titled Guantanamera was released in 1970 in the UK on the A&M label (AMLB 1004) with a different cover and a track list composed of eight songs from the original Guantanamera LP plus three songs from The Sandpipers LP. Stan Britt of Record Buyer magazine supplied the sleeve notes.

In the 2012 novel A Quiet Life in Bedlam by Patricia Bjornstad, the lead character Kate Bamber relates a detailed fictional account (p. 94) of being the subject of the Guantanamera cover photo.

== Track listing ==
Side One

1. "Guantanamera" (Héctor Angulo/José Martí/Pete Seeger) – 3:13
2. "Strangers in the Night" (Bert Kaempfert/Charles Singleton/Eddie Snyder) – 2:38
3. "Carmen" (Nick De Caro) – 3:08
4. "Cast Your Fate to the Wind" (Vince Guaraldi/Carel Werber) – 1:48
5. "La Bamba" (Traditional) – 2:43
6. "La Mer (Beyond the Sea)" (Charles Trenet/Jack Lawrence) – 2:40

Side Two

1. "Louie, Louie" (Richard Berry) – 2:47
2. "Things We Said Today" (John Lennon/Paul McCartney) – 2:53
3. "Enamorado" (Keith Colley-Paul Rubio) – 2:04
4. "What Makes You Dream, Pretty Girl?" (Garson/Wilson) – 2:40
5. "Stasera Gli Angeli Non Volano (For The Last Time)" (Mogol/Pattacini) – 2:20
6. "Angelica" (Barry Mann/Cynthia Weil) – 3:39

The 8-track tape releases (L-51-117 and 8T-4117) had a different track order: A1-A5-B3, A3-B5-A6, B1-B2-B4, A2-A4-B6.

== Production ==
- Producer: Tommy LiPuma
- Arranger: Mort Garson and Nick DeCaro
- Engineer: Bruce Botnick
- Spanish Consultant: Miss Consuelo Ortega
- Album Design: Peter Whorf Graphics
- Album Notes: Derek Taylor

== Reissue ==
The album was combined with The Sandpipers in a 2000 CD release by Collectors' Choice Music.
