= Misty Roses =

Studio album by The Sandpipers
- Released: 1967
- Genre: Pop
- Label: A&M LP-135/SP-4135
- Producer: Tommy LiPuma

The Sandpipers chronology
| The Sandpipers (1967) | Misty Roses (1967) | Softly (1968) |

Professional ratings
Review scores
| Source | Rating |
|---|---|
| Allmusic | 4/5 stars |

Misty Roses was an LP album by The Sandpipers released by A&M Records in 1967. The album reached #135 on the Billboard chart and the first track, "Cuando Salí de Cuba," made #3 on the Billboard Adult Contemporary chart.

The December 23, 1967 issue of Billboard Magazine reviewed the album:

The Sandpipers have established themselves as good album sellers and this new entry should sustain their sales pace. The title song is a winner and will draw plays, as will the rest of the solid repertoire.

Catalog numbers were LP-135/SP-4135 in the U.S. and Canada, and AMLS912 in the U.K. Other international releases included Australia (Mayfair SMF66-9924), Austria (A&M 212 026), Brazil (Fermata FB-207), Columbia (Fermata LPF 24-46), Germany (A&M 212 026), South Africa (A&M LAM 2032), Spain (A&M/Hispavox HDAS 371-14), and Taiwan (First S-FL-1575, orange vinyl, and Bell SWL-1137, red vinyl). The album was reissued in 1974 on the U.K. Mayfair label.

== Track listing ==
Side One

1. "Cuando Salí de Cuba" (Luis Aguilé) 2:39
2. "And I Love Her" (John Lennon/Paul McCartney) 2:19
3. "Fly Me to the Moon (In Other Words)" (Bart Howard) 1:51
4. "Strange Song" (Chip Taylor) 2:43
5. "The Honeywind Blows" (Fred Hellerman/Fran Minkoff) 2:30

Side Two

1. "Misty Roses" (Tim Hardin) 3:27
2. "Today" (Randy Sparks) 2:25
3. "I Believed It All" (Al Hirt/Alan Bergman/Marilyn Bergman) 2:49
4. "Daydream" (John Sebastian) 2:15
5. "Wooden Heart" (Fred Wise/Ben Weisman/Kay Twomey/Bert Kaempfert) 2:11

== Production ==
- Producer: Tommy LiPuma
- Arrangers: Perry Botkin, Jr., Nick DeCaro
- Engineers: Henry Lewy, Bruce Botnick
- Album Design: Corporate Head
- Art Director: Tom Wilkes
- Photography: Guy Webster
- Back Cover: Peter Whorf

== Reissue ==
The album was combined with The Wonder of You in a 2006 CD release by Collectors' Choice Music.
