= Any Day Now (Scott Walker album) =

Studio album by Scott Walker
- Released: May 1973
- Recorded: 1973
- Genres: Pop; easy listening
- Length: 37:34
- Label: Philips
- Producer: John Franz

Scott Walker chronology
The Moviegoer (1972)	Any Day Now (1973)	Stretch (1973)

Singles from Any Day Now
- 1. "The Me I Never Knew" b/w "This Way Mary" Released: May 1973

Any Day Now is the eighth solo studio album by the American singer Scott Walker. It was released in May 1973 but failed to chart. "The Me I Never Knew" was released as the album's sole single backed with the opening track of The Moviegoer; "This Way Mary". Any Day Now was Walker's final studio album for Philips Records and he subsequently signed with CBS Records (now Columbia).

== Availability ==
The continued unavailability of Any Day Now is due to Walker's dissatisfaction with his four albums from 1972's The Moviegoer to 1974's We Had It All, as well as 1969's Scott Walker Sings Songs from his T.V. Series, all of which were made up entirely of cover versions and which he describes in the documentary Scott Walker: 30 Century Man as his "wilderness years". Walker later blocked ...T.V. Series, The Moviegoer and Any Day Now from being released on CD, while Stretch (1973) and We Had It All were released on CD in 1997 by an independent label without Walker's own approval.

In spite of the album's deletion, over half of the songs were released during the 2000s on Scott Walker compilation CDs. "The Me I Never Knew", "We Could Be Flying", "Do I Love You?", "When You Get Right Down to It", "Cowboy", and "All My Love's Laughter" are included on 2005's Classics & Collectibles, while "Any Day Now" is included on the 2004 budget-priced The Collection. "If Ships Were Made To Sail" appears on a various artists compilation CD of Jimmy Webb penned songs titled And Someone Left The Cake Out In The Rain, released in 1998. "Maria Bethania", "If" and "Ain't No Sunshine" remain unavailable.

== Reception ==
Professional ratings
Review scores
Source	Rating
AllMusic	2/5 stars

In common with Walker's 1970s output, Any Day Now was poorly received by critics but has been reassessed since Walker was critically reappraised in the decades following The Walker Brothers' 1978 album Nite Flights.

== Track listing ==
Side one
No.	Title	Writer(s)	Length
1.	"Any Day Now"	Bob Hilliard, Burt Bacharach	3:33
2.	"All My Love's Laughter"	Jimmy Webb	4:05
3.	"Do I Love You?"	Albert Pelay, Alain le Govic, Yves Dessca, Maxime Piolot, Paul Anka	2:53
4.	"Maria Bethania"	Caetano Veloso	4:57
5.	"Cowboy"	Randy Newman	2:30
6.	"When You Get Right Down to It"	Barry Mann	2:59

Side two
No.	Title	Writer(s)	Length
7.	"If"	David Gates	3:16
8.	"Ain't No Sunshine"	Bill Withers	2:45
9.	"The Me I Never Knew"	Don Black, John Barry	3:39
10.	"If Ships Were Made to Sail"	Jimmy Webb	2:37
11.	"We Could Be Flying"	Michel Colombier, Paul Williams	4:20

== Personnel ==
- Scott Walker - vocals
- Peter Knight - arrangements, conductor
- Robert Cornford - arrangements, conductor on tracks: A4, A6, B1, B5
- John Franz - producer
- Peter J. Olliff - engineer

== Release details ==
Region	Date	Label	Format	Catalogue
United Kingdom	May 1973	Philips	LP	6308 148
