= Stretch (album) =

Studio album by Scott Walker
- Released: November 1973
- Recorded: 1973
- Studios: Nova Studios, Marble Arch, London
- Genres: Pop; country; country pop
- Length: 41:24
- Label: Columbia 65725
- Producer: Del Newman

Scott Walker chronology
Any Day Now (1973)	Stretch (1973)	We Had It All (1974)

Singles from Stretch
- 1. "A Woman Left Lonely" b/w "Where Love Has Died" Released: October 1973

Stretch is the ninth solo studio album by the American singer Scott Walker. It was released in November 1973 but was unsuccessful on the music charts. It was Walker's first album for CBS/Columbia records after departing from Philips Records.

The album's producer Del Newman contributed one new song, "Someone Who Cared", while the remainder of the album was covers of songs by artists such as Randy Newman and Jimmy Webb. Recorded in 1973 at Nova Studios, Marble Arch, London, the album was released in November that year. The first CD issue of Stretch was in 1997 by BGO Records as a 2-fer with its follow-up album We Had It All.

== Reception ==
Professional ratings
Review scores
Source	Rating
AllMusic	2/5 stars

Stretch received negative reviews from critics. It was one of five albums Walker later disowned from his career (the others being Scott Walker Sings Songs from his T.V. Series, The Moviegoer, Any Day Now and We Had It All).

== Track listing ==
Side one
No.	Title	Writer(s)	Length
1.	"Sunshine"	Mickey Newbury	4:27
2.	"Just One Smile"	Randy Newman	4:23
3.	"A Woman Left Lonely"	Spooner Oldham, Dan Penn	3:22
4.	"No Easy Way Down"	Gerry Goffin, Carole King	4:37
5.	"That's How I Got to Memphis"	Tom T. Hall	3:10

Side two
No.	Title	Writer(s)	Length
6.	"Use Me"	Bill Withers	4:19
7.	"Frisco Depot"	Mickey Newbury	3:46
8.	"Someone Who Cared"	Del Newman	2:58
9.	"Where Does Brown Begin"	Jimmy Webb	4:35
10.	"Where Love Has Died"	Jim Owen	2:23
11.	"I'll Be Home"	Randy Newman	3:24

== Release details ==
Country	Date	Label	Format	Catalog	
United Kingdom	November 1973	CBS Records	Vinyl	65725	
United Kingdom	November 1973	CBS Records	Cassette	40-55725	
United Kingdom	1997	BGO Records	CD	BGOCD358	Coupled with We Had It All
