= Come Saturday Morning (song) =

Single by The Sandpipers

from the album The Sterile Cuckoo
- B-side: "Pretty Flamingo"
- Released: October 1969
- Recorded: 1969
- Genre: Pop
- Length: 2:57
- Label: A&M
- Songwriters: Fred Karlin, Dory Previn
- Producer: Allen Stanton

The Sandpipers singles chronology
"Hurry to Me" (1969)	"Come Saturday Morning" (1969)	"Santo Domingo" (1970)

"Come Saturday Morning" is a popular song with music by Fred Karlin and lyrics by Dory Previn, published in 1969.

== Background ==
It was first performed by The Sandpipers on the soundtrack of the 1969 film The Sterile Cuckoo starring Liza Minnelli. The Sandpipers also included the song on their 1970 album, Come Saturday Morning. In 1970, "Come Saturday Morning" was nominated for the Academy Award for Best Original Song, losing to "Raindrops Keep Fallin' on My Head" from the film Butch Cassidy and the Sundance Kid.

== Chart performance ==
The Sandpipers' recording, issued with "Pretty Flamingo" as the B-side, debuted on the Billboard Hot 100 in December 1969, remaining in the chart for eight weeks and peaking at #83 in January 1970 and also lasting 13 weeks on the Easy Listening chart, peaking at #9. The single, reissued with "To Put Up with You" as the B-side, re-entered both charts in April 1970, when it spent an additional 12 weeks on the Hot 100, peaking at #17 in June, and an additional 11 weeks on the Easy Listening chart, peaking at #8. The song also peaked at #78 in Australia, becoming the group's only charting release in that country.

== Other recordings include ==
- Liza Minnelli in 1969 on her album Come Saturday Morning.
- Chet Baker on his 1970 album Blood, Chet and Tears
- Johnny Mathis on his 1970 album Close To You
- Tony Bennett on his 1970 album Tony Bennett's Something
- Patti Page on her 1970 album Honey Come Back
- Mark Lindsay on his 1970 album Silverbird
- Scott Walker on his 1972 album The Moviegoer
- Billy Vaughn on his 1970 album Winter World Of Love
- Woody Herman on his 1974 album Thundering Herd
- Rumer on her 2010 CD single Aretha

== In popular culture ==
The Sandpipers' variation is also heard in a Baby Songs 1991 video spinoff called "Baby Rock".
