= We Had It All =

Studio album by Scott Walker
- Released: August 1974
- Recorded: 1973–1974
- Studios: Nova Studios, Marble Arch, London
- Genres: Pop; country; country pop; easy listening
- Length: 34:37
- Label: Columbia
- Producer: Del Newman

Scott Walker chronology
Stretch (1973)	We Had It All (1974)	No Regrets by The Walker Brothers (1975)

Singles from We Had It All
- 1. "Delta Dawn" b/w "We Had It All" Released: July 1974

We Had It All is the tenth solo studio album by the American singer Scott Walker. It was released in August 1974 but was unsuccessful on the music charts. It was Walker's final solo album for ten years; in the interim he reformed The Walker Brothers for three albums, the last of which, 1978's Nite Flights, included his first original songs since his 1970 solo album 'Til the Band Comes In.

Four of the 10 songs on the album were written by Billy Joe Shaver and had previously appeared on Waylon Jennings's 1973 outlaw country album Honky Tonk Heroes, as had the title track. The album was recorded in 1974 at Nova Studios, Marble Arch, London and released in August that year. The artwork for the album was produced by Roslav Szaybo with photography from M. Joseph. We Had It All was first released on CD in 1997 by BGO Records as a 2-fer with Walker's previous album Stretch.

== Critical reception ==
Professional ratings
Review scores
Source	Rating
Allmusic	2/5 stars
Allmusic (Stretch/We Had It All)	2/5 stars

We Had It All received mostly negative reviews. Sidney Nelson of the Bucks Examiner noted the "slightly world-weary touch" to Walker's voice but it also its power and tone, further praising the "most pleasing" self-produced album for containing "cleverly chosen" songs and expertly handled performances. "A singer I always felt deserved more solo success", the reviewer concluded, "Scott enhances that opinion with an LP of good easy listening."

Retrospectively, Stephen Thomas Erlewine of AllMusic noted Walker's new focus on country music and felt that, despite being "still a little musically tentative" and lamenting the continued lack of original material, We Had It All is nonetheless the singer's "strongest record in years, since the country leanings are a welcome change of pace and he sings with authority throughout the record." In an AllMusic review of the 1997 CD release which pairs We Had It All with its predecessor, Stretch (1973), Erlewine deemed both albums to be "slight collections of contemporary country-pop and folk-rock covers, produced in an anemic, bloodless fashion where the strings don't soar, they limp."

Wilson Neate of Trouser Press similarly noted that, whereas Walker dabbled with country music on Stretch, he explored this direction further with We Had It All, "this time with a little more success". Neate deems both albums to be reasonably entertaining but noted that Walker was "going through the motions, refusing to challenge himself or his listener the way he did on his first four albums."

We Had It All was the last of five albums Walker later disowned from his career (the others being Scott Walker Sings Songs from his T.V. Series, The Moviegoer, Any Day Now and Stretch).

== Track listing ==
Side one
No.	Title	Writer(s)	Length
1.	"Low Down Freedom"	Billy Joe Shaver	3:43
2.	"We Had It All"	Donnie Fritts, Troy Seals	3:29
3.	"Black Rose"	Billy Joe Shaver	3:16
4.	"Ride Me Down Easy"	Billy Joe Shaver	3:32
5.	"You're Young and You'll Forget"	Jerry Reed	2:27

Side two
No.	Title	Writer(s)	Length
6.	"The House Song"	Robert H. Bannard, Paul Stookey	3:44
7.	"What Ever Happened to Saturday Night"	Randy Meisner, Don Henley, Glenn Frey, Bernie Leadon	2:53
8.	"Sundown"	Gordon Lightfoot	4:49
9.	"Old Five and Dimers Like Me"	Billy Joe Shaver	2:58
10.	"Delta Dawn"	Alex Harvey	3:47

== Release details ==
Country	Date	Label	Format	Catalog	
United Kingdom	1974	CBS Records	Vinyl	80254	
United Kingdom	1997	BGO Records	CD	BGOCD358	Coupled with Stretch
