= The Sandpipers (album) =

Studio album by The Sandpipers
- Released: May 1967
- Genre: Pop/Rock
- Label: A&M LP 125/SP 4125
- Producer: Tommy LiPuma

The Sandpipers chronology
Guantanamera (1966)	The Sandpipers (1967)	Misty Roses (1967)

Alternative cover
- Australia release

Professional ratings
Review scores
Source	Rating
Allmusic	3/5 stars

The Sandpipers was an LP album featuring the group of the same name, released by A&M Records in May 1967. The album reached #53 on the Billboard charts.

The catalog numbers were LP 125 in monaural and SP 4125 in stereo in the U.S. and AML 901 in the U.K. Other international releases included Argentina (Fermata LF-130, titled Los Sandpipers Volumen 2), Australia (A&M SAML-932), Canada (A&M LP 125), Germany (A&M 212 005), Italy (A&M AP 4125), South Africa (A&M LAM 2014, titled The French Song), Spain (A&M HD (S) 371-08), Taiwan (First FL-S-1555, red vinyl, and Bell SWL-1068, orange vinyl), and Venezuela (Fermata LP-7212). The album was also released under license in Australia by World Record Club with a different cover titled Softly As I Leave You (R-03855).

The May 6, 1967 issue of Record World reviewed the album: Enticing, sultry group crooning of the Sandpipers is building a reputation. This package will enhance it. They select old and new, familiar and unfamiliar tunes like "Inchworm," "Yesterday" and their new single, "Glass."

== Track listing ==
Side One

1. "The French Song" (Harry Pease/Larry Vincent) 3:10
2. "Bon Soir Dame" (Bud Dashiell) 2:45
3. "For Baby" (John Denver) 2:46
4. "Inch Worm" (Frank Loesser) 3:15
5. "It's Over" (Jimmie Rodgers) 2:50
6. "Glass" (Marks/Sheldon) 3:08

Side Two

1. "Rain, Rain Go Away" (Kuiokalani Lee) 2:15
2. "Yesterday" (John Lennon/Paul McCartney) 2:21
3. "Michelle" (John Lennon/Paul McCartney) 3:00
4. "Try To Remember" (Tom Jones/Harvey Schmidt) 2:55
5. "I'll Remember You" (Kuiokalani Lee) 2:34
6. "Softly As I Leave You" (Antonio De Vita/Giorgio Calabrese/Hal Shaper) 3:00

== Production ==
- Producer: Tommy LiPuma
- Arranger: Nick DeCaro (Side 1), Mort Garson (Side 2)
- Engineer: Bruce Botnick
- Album design: Peter Whorf
- Album notes: Barry Gold

== Reissue ==
The album was combined with Guantanamera in a 2000 CD release by Collectors' Choice Music.
