= Quando m'innamoro =

1968 Italian song

"Quando m'innamoro" is a 1968 Italian song written by Daniele Pace, Mario Panzeri and Roberto Livraghi and sung with a double performance by Anna Identici and by the Sandpipers at the 1968 Sanremo Music Festival, in which it came 6th.

== Recording in other languages ==
- The song was adapted into French under the title "Comment te dire" and was recorded by Joe Dassin.
- In English as "A Man Without Love", it was recorded by Engelbert Humperdinck and became a big international hit.
- In Spanish, the song was sung as "Cuando me enamoro", most famously sung by Angélica María.
- In Japanese as "Ai no hana saku toki" (愛の花咲くとき).
- In Estonian, the song has been performed by Uno Loop with lyrics by Kustas Kikerpuu, titled "Oled teinud mind õnnelikuks".
- In Finnish, the song was first recorded by Fredi with lyrics by Juha Vainio, titled "Milloinkaan en löydä samanlaista". Later versions have been performed by Kari Tapio and Jamppa Tuominen.
- In Swedish, the song has been sung as "Sommaren det hände" ("The Summer When It Happened") by Anna-Lena Löfgren and as "Före min tid" ("Before My Time") by Knut Agnred as a part of the comedy musical Lyckad nedfrysning av herr Moro ("Successful Freezing of Mr Moro"), performed in 1994–95 by Galenskaparna and After Shave, with lyrics by Claes Eriksson.
- In Russian as "Верить в свою звезду" ("Believing to Your Star") by Yury Okhochinsky.
- In Portuguese as "Quando me enamoro" by Agnaldo Rayol, Agnaldo Timóteo and George Freedman; by Simone de Oliveira.
- In Greek as "Πάντα Στη Ζωή Μου" by Zoitsa Kouroukli (1968).
- In 1969, Vico Torriani recorded a cover in German, inserted in the album Buona sera, Vico! ("Good Evening, Vico!") (Philips, 844 368 PY), released in Germany and Austria.
- In Hungarian as "Szívtelen teremtés" by Teréz Harangozó (1968).
- In Macedonian as "Еднаш да се вљубам" ("Once to Fall in Love") by the Slovenian singer Elda Viler.

== Other recordings ==
- The song was also released in 2005 by Patrizio Buanne in Italian and English on his album The Italian. "Quando m'innamoro" has also been covered by artists including Ray Conniff, Julio Iglesias, Lionel Hampton, Sergio Franchi, Emilio Pericoli, Gigliola Cinquetti and Andrea Bocelli.

== Engelbert Humperdinck recording ==
"A Man Without Love"

Single by Engelbert Humperdinck

from the album A Man Without Love
- B-side: "Call On Me"
- Released: May 1968 (U.S.)
- Length: 3:20
- Label: Decca (U.K.); Parrot (U.S.)
- Songwriters: Daniele Pace, Mario Panzeri, Roberto Livraghi, Barry Mason
- Producer: Peter Sullivan

Engelbert Humperdinck singles chronology
"Am I That Easy to Forget" (1967)	"A Man Without Love" (1968)	"Quando, Quando, Quando" (1968)

The song's English lyrics were written by Barry Mason as "A Man Without Love". The most popular version was recorded in 1968 by Engelbert Humperdinck, who in the UK hit #2 on the chart. In the US, the Humperdinck version went to #19 on the Hot 100 and #3 on the Easy Listening chart. It was the title track of his third LP.

=== Chart history ===
==== Weekly charts ====
Chart (1968)	Peak position
Australia (Go-Set)	5
Austria (Ö3 Austria Top 40)	6
Belgium (Ultratop 50 Flanders)	1
Belgium (Ultratop 50 Wallonia)	1
Canada RPM Top Singles	8
Germany (GfK)	6
Ireland (IRMA)	1
Netherlands (Dutch Top 40)	6
Netherlands (Single Top 100)	5
New Zealand (Listener)	4
Norway (VG-lista)	3
South Africa	2
Switzerland (Schweizer Hitparade)	1
UK Singles (Official Charts)	2
US Billboard Hot 100	19
U.S. Billboard Easy Listening	3
U.S. Cash Box Top 100	18

The Sandpipers (Italian version)

Chart (1968)	Peak position
UK Singles (Official Charts)	33
U.S. Billboard Bubbling Under Hot 100	124

Joe Dassin ("Comment te dire", French version)

Chart (1968)	Peak position
Belgium (Ultratop 50 Wallonia)	2

==== Year-end charts ====
Chart (1968)	Rank
UK	17
U.S. Adult Contemporary	12

=== Certifications ===
Region	Certification	Certified units/sales
New Zealand (RMNZ)	Gold	15,000^{‡}
United Kingdom (BPI) Sales since 2005	Silver	200,000^{‡}
^{‡} Sales+streaming figures based on certification alone.

== In popular culture ==
- Humperdinck's version was used in the 2005 film Romance & Cigarettes.
- The song is featured in 2 episodes of the Marvel Cinematic Universe Disney+ series Moon Knight, the premiere "The Goldfish Problem" and the finale "Gods and Monsters".
