= The Sandpipers =

American band

- 1966 publicity photo. L-R Mike Piano, Jim Brady, Richard Shoff

Background information
- Origin: California, U.S.
- Genre: Folk rock
- Years active: 1966–1975
- Label: A&M
- Past members: Jim Brady; Mike Piano; Richard Shoff; Michael Brady; Gary Duckworth; Ralph Nichols

The Sandpipers were an American easy listening trio who carved a niche in 1960s folk rock with their vocals and innovative arrangements of international ballads and pop standards. They are best remembered for their cover version of "Guantanamera", which became a transatlantic top 10 hit in 1966, and their top 20 hit "Come Saturday Morning" from the soundtrack of The Sterile Cuckoo in 1970.

Singing in English, Spanish, French, Italian, Portuguese, Latin, and Tagalog, the Sandpipers had seven album entries in the Billboard 200 from 1966 to 1970, and over a dozen charted singles.

== Career ==
Founding members Jim Brady (born August 24, 1944, Los Angeles), Mike Piano (born October 26, 1944, Rochester, New York) and Richard Shoff (born April 30, 1944, Seattle) first performed together in the Mitchell Boys Choir, before forming the Four Seasons with friend Nick Cahuernga. Because of the rising popularity of a group with that name from New Jersey, they changed their name to the Grads and continued as a trio.

Although the Grads did not enter the charts with their early recordings, they performed well enough to secure a residency at Harrah's Lake Club (now Harveys Lake Tahoe) where a friend brought them to the attention of Herb Alpert of A&M Records. Alpert was impressed with the Grads, but after one single without success the group agreed to a name change, choosing the Sandpipers out of a dictionary. Following a stint at the Silver Nugget, their producer, Tommy LiPuma, recommended they record the Cuban anthem "Guantanamera" and they had their first hit. The use of female singers (including Robie Lester) to add background vocals on "Guantanamera" established a trend that the Sandpipers would incorporate in multiple future studio recordings and live shows.

Initially Kathy Westmoreland (later with Elvis Presley) toured with the group to provide the lyricless vocals that were used much like second strings, adding an ethereal quality to the Sandpipers' sound. Later Pamela Ramcier was the primary back-up vocalist. At times two or more back-up vocalists were used. For the Sandpipers' first live show in San Diego, two female singers were on stage, the well-known folk singer Penny Nichols and Pat Woolley. Early pressings of the Guantanamera LP showed a five person group—two females with Piano, Shoff, and Brady—on the back cover while later pressings had just the male trio. Subsequent albums depicted only the original trio. Other backup singers followed including Stormie Sherk in 1967, and Diane Jordan and Kathy Westmoreland in 1969. Some pressings of the 1970 Come Saturday Morning LP credit "solo voices" Patrice Holloway, Carolyn Willis, and Susan Tallman.

"Guantanamera" charted in the United States in September 1966 and in the United Kingdom the following month, and remains the group's biggest hit, earning 1967 Grammy Award nominations for Best Performance by a Vocal Group and Best Contemporary Group Performance, plus gold record awards for the single and the album. They also had many lesser chart entries including cover versions of "Louie Louie", "The French Song" (Quand Le Soleil Dit Bonjour Aux Montagnes), and songs from the movies The Sterile Cuckoo and Beyond the Valley of the Dolls.

The record sleeve for their 1966 album Guantanamera was nominated for a Grammy Award for Best Album Cover, Photography. Dolores Erickson was featured on the front cover artwork. In 1967 the Baldwin Piano Company signed the group to promote the company's line of musical instruments.

In 1968, following a South Africa concert tour, they participated at the Festival di Sanremo in Italy, a highlight on the Italian music calendar. They were, as then usual, alongside Anna Identici as one of the two performers of the song "Quando M'Innamoro," which attained sixth place. The song would become more popular in the interpretation by Gigliola Cinquetti. The English version by British pop singer Engelbert Humperdinck, "A Man Without Love", became a global hit.

In 1969, the group embarked on a European tour with appearances in London, Amsterdam, Stockholm, Madrid, and Berlin. In 1970 "Come Saturday Morning" was nominated for Best Original Song and was performed by the Sandpipers at the 42nd Academy Awards ceremony. In the mid-1970s, Michael Piano left the group and was replaced in turn by Michael Brady, (Note: Brother of Jim Brady and former bassist for the group's backup band. After three years with the group, he left to become a notable studio bassist.) Gary Duckworth (Note: Duckworth, along with George Green and Jim Brady's brother Mike, formed Griffin and released an eponymous LP and several singles in 1972 on the L.A.-based Romar label. He also released one single in 1976 on the Nashville-based D.P.A. label ("Move Out of the City"/"Stop, Look and Listen").) and Ralph Nichols (later with The Lettermen). The final 1979 single, "Singapore Girl", featured only Brady and Shoff.

Original member Michael Piano died on December 29, 2014, in Kauaʻi, Hawaii. Jim Brady died on May 5, 2019, in Durango, Colorado.

== Other groups named Sandpipers ==
1. In 1965–66, an American girl group from Pensacola, Florida, briefly toured and recorded as the Sandpipers, backed by an early Gregg and Duane Allman band called the Allman Joys. After "Guantanamera" was released they became the Daisies.
2. Another group known as the Sandpipers (or sometimes the Golden Sandpipers) sang for Golden Records, most notably the theme to Mighty Mouse, the version that is now the best known and perhaps the original (although some sources cite the Terrytooners with Mitch Miller and orchestra). (Note: Regular members included Mike Stewart, Ralph Nyland, Dick Byron, and Bob Miller. Other members were Anne Lloyd, Sally Sweetland, Mary Jane Sutherland, and Peter Hanley.)
3. A South African folk rock group active in the 1960s was also named the Sandpipers.
4. A female choral group at Albertus Magnus College known as the Sandpipers released an LP in 1961.
5. A South Florida trio (Art Williams, Wally Pape, Billy Stuart) released one LP, The Singin', Swingin' Sandpipers, in 1965 on the Art label.
6. A New York group released one single as the Sandpipers in 1966 on the Kismet label.
7. A Detroit group released one single as the Sandpipers in 1966 on the Giant label.
8. The Nashville-based Cypress label released a single by the Sand Pipers in 1966.
9. The Florida Presbyterian College Concert Choir and Sandpipers released an LP in the 1960s.
10. A Malaysian group released three EPs as the Sandpipers in the 1960s: Hey Tak Malu (with Azim Chan) on the Maria label, and Nyatakan Lah Pada Ku and Deritaan Insan (with Siti Khatijah Hamid) on the Playboy label.
11. An instrumental group from Mason City, Iowa, released an LP, The Sandpipers Play Fiesta! and Other Favorites, in the late 1960s on the Fredlo label featuring several Herb Alpert covers.
12. A country and western LP, Silver Dollar Saloon, and an EP, Irish Eyes, were released in 1975 by Gary Lane, Chris Beckett, and the Sandpipers.

== Discography ==
=== Albums ===
U.S. releases on A&M Records unless otherwise noted. Some releases in U.K. and other countries had different titles, alternate covers, and variations in track lists.

- Guantanamera (LP-117*/SP-4117, 1966, No. 13)
- The Sandpipers (LP-125*/SP-4125, 1967, No. 53)
- Misty Roses (LP-135*/SP-4135, 1967, No. 135)
- Softly (SP-4147, 1968, No. 180)
- Spanish Album (SP-4159, 1969)
- The Wonder of You (SP-4180, 1969, No. 194) (Note: Released in Mexico as Lo Maravilloso De Ti with song titles translated into Spanish (and in many cases differently from the translations for the same songs for the Spanish Album).)
- Second Spanish Album (AMLS-969, 1970) (UK release)
- Come Saturday Morning (SP-4262, 1970, No. 96)
- A Gift of Song (SP-4328, 1971)
- Overdue (Satril SATL 4006, 1976) (UK release) (Note: Also released in Philippines with same catalog number. Released in Japan as Singapore Girl (Satril YX-7145-SR) with different track order. Released in Spain on cassette in 1978 (Satril STC-5001) and again in 1984 (Satril 50.271). Not released in U.S.)
- Ay, Ay, Ay, Manila! (RCA XFPLI-021, 1977) (Philippines release) (Note: All songs in Tagalog language. LP cover has text "The First Tagalog Album From An International Group".)

*Mono

=== EPs ===
- Misty Roses (A&M SP-425, 1967), 6-song jukebox EP, plus numerous international releases (Note: U.S. jukebox EP tracks: "Cuando Salí de Cuba", "And I Love Her", "Fly Me to the Moon", "Strange Song", "Misty Roses", "Daydream".) (Note: International EP releases: Australia; A&M AMX 11,218 ("Guantanamera", "What Makes You Dream, Pretty Girl", "La Bamba", "La Mer (Beyond the Sea)"), 1966 A&M AMX 11,231 ("Louie Louie", "Things We Said Today", "For the Last Time", "Angelica"), 1966 A&M AMX 11,398 ("The French Song", "Bon Soir Dame", "Rain, Rain Go Away", "Yesterday") A&M AMX 11,714 ("Come Saturday Morning", "Carmen", "The Windmills of Your Mind", "The More I Love You"), 1970: Brazil; A&M/Fermata EPE-573 ("Guantanamera", "Cast Your Fate to the Wind", "La Bamba", "For Baby") A&M 7AMD-10002 ("Angelique", "Softly as I Leave You", "Quando M'Innamoro", "Cuando Salí de Cuba") A&M 7AMD-10014 ("Himno Á Alegria (Song of Joy)", "The Wonder of You", "Come Saturday Morning", "The Long and Winding Road"): France; Columbia ESRF 1802 ("Guantanamera", "What Makes You Dream, Pretty Girl", "Everything in the Garden", "Stage Door"), 1966 Columbia ESRF 1826 ("Louie Louie", "Things We Said Today", "La Bamba", "Angelica"), 1966: Germany; Star SL 101 ("Guantanamera", "To Sir with Love", "San Francisco", "Let's Pretend"), 1967: Iran; Top4 EX-4189 ("Guantanamera", "Cast Your Fate to the Wind", "What Makes You Dream Prety [sic] Girl?", "Angelica"), Japan; A&M LS 158 ("Quando M'Innamoro", "Louie Louie", "Cuando Salí De Cuba", "Guantanamera"), 1968 A&M AMS-13 ("Stasera (sic) Gli Angeli Non Volano (For The Last Time)", "The Long and Winding Road", "A Song of Joy (Himno a La Alegria)", "Come Saturday Morning"), 1970 A&M AMS-25 ("Today", "Santo Domingo", "Cuando Salí De Cuba", "Ayer") Paramount SJET-546 ("Come Saturday Morning" (Sandpipers), "Jerry", "Pookie Adams", "End Walk" (Sandpipers)): Mexico; Tizoc ED-221 ("Guantanamera", "Extranos En La Noche" (Strangers In The Night), "Enamorado", "Lanza Tus Penas Al Viento (Cast Your Fate to the Wind)"), 1966 Tizoc ED-270 ("Cuando Me Enamoro", "Viento Primaveral", "Extraña Melodia", "Corazon De Madera"), 1968 A&M AME-10 ("Guantanamera", "Llevame A La Luna", "Cuando Salí De Cuba", "Ojos Españoles), 1968 A&M AME-46 ("Ven El Sabado En La Mañana", "Santo Domingo", "Himno a La Alegria") A&M AME-75 ("How Can You Mend a Broken Heart", "Never My Love", "It's Too Late", "Never Can Say Goodbye"), 1972: New Zealand; A&M 11218 ("Guantanamera", "What Makes You Dream, Pretty Girl", "La Bamba", "La Mer (Beyond the Sea)"), 1966 A&M 11231 ("Louie Louie", "Things We Said Today", "For the Last Time", "Angelica"), 1966 A&M 11398 ("The French Song", "Bon Soir Dame", "Rain, Rain Go Away", "Yesterday"): Portugal; A&M/Alvorada EP-25-1 ("Guantanamera", "Cast Your Fate to the Wind", "Enamorado", "Strangers in the Night") A&M/Alvorada EP-25-2 ("For Baby", "Michelle", "Bon Soir Dame", "Ayer (Yesterday)") A&M/Alvorada EP-25-9 ("The French Song", "Inch Worm", "It's Over", "Glass") A&M/Alvorada EP-25-10 ("Rain, Rain Go Away", "Try To Remember", "I'll Remember You", "Softly as I Leave You") A&M/Alvorada EP-25-13 ("Cuando Salí De Cuba", "Wooden Heart", "Misty Roses", "Daydream") A&M/Alvorada EP-25-20 ("Softly", "Wanderlove", "Quando M'Innamoro", "Fly Me to the Moon") A&M/Alvorada EP-25-21 ("Strange Song", "The Honeywind Blows", "Today", "And I Love Her") A&M/Alvorada EP-25-25 ("Kum-Ba-Yah", "La Bamba", "Canto de Ossanha", "I Believed It All") A&M/Alvorada EP-25-28 ("The Wonder of You", "If I Were a Man [sic]", "That Night", "The Windmills of Your Mind"): Singapore; Star Record SL 101 ("Guantanamera", "To Sir, With Love", "San Francisco", "Let's Pretend": Spain; A&M/Hispavox 377-11 ("Guantanamera", "Enamorado", "Mi Destino Al Viento", "Extranos En La Noche"), 1967 A&M/Hispavox 377-13 ("Michelle", "Ayer", "Para Baby", "Bon Soir Dame"), 1967: UK; Pye International NEP 44081 ("Guantanamera", "Things We Said Today", "Louie Louie", "What Makes You Dream, Pretty Girl"), 1966 Pye International NEP 44085 ("Angelica", "Enamorado", "Strangers in the Night", "Carmen"), 1967 A&M AME 801 ("Cast Your Fate to the Wind", "La Mer (Beyond the Sea)", "La Bamba", "Strasera Gli Angeli Non Volano (For the Last Time)"))

=== Compilations ===
- I Successi Dei Sandpipers (A&M POP 79, 1969, Italy)
- Greatest Hits (A&M SP-4246, 1970, No. 160) (Note: Ten songs from first four albums. Also released in Japan (A&M AML-59), UK (A&M AMLS 940, different cover), and Spain (A&M 80694, 1974, titled Grandes Exitos))
- Softly as I Leave You (A&M AMLS 975, 1970, UK) (Note: Fourteen songs from five previous albums.)
- Michelle (A&M/Summit SRA-250-081, 1970, Australia) (Note: Eleven songs from The Sandpipers, The Wonder of You, and Softly albums.)
- La Bamba (A&M/Mayfair AMLB 51030, 1971, UK) (Note: Twelve songs from five previous albums.)
- Golden Double Deluxe (A&M AMW-23, 1971, Japan) (Note: Double LP manufactured by King Record Co. Also released in New Zealand on A&M as Double Deluxe)
- Golden Prize (A&M GP-207, 1971, Japan)
- Stars in Gold (A&M 80 828 XT, 1972, Germany) (Note: Double LP with 24 tracks from previous albums. Group poster included.)
- Sweet with a Beat (Reader's Digest RDS 7096, 1973, Germany) (Note: Split LP: 7 songs by the Sandpipers and 7 by Judith Durham.)
- Foursider (A&M SP-6015, 1973) (Note: Double LP with 20 tracks from all seven previous studio albums.)
- Portrait Of The Sandpipers (A&M AMLC4004, 1973, UK) (Note: Double LP with 30 tracks including all 24 songs from Spanish Album and Second Spanish Album plus "Strasera Gli Angeli Non Volvano (For the Last Time)", "Chotto Matte Kudasai (Never Say Goodbye)", "Kumbaya", and "Santo Domingo".)
- O Melhor De (Opus/Columbia 413.615, 1984, Brazil)
- Very Best Of (A&M Audio Master Plus Series 396911-2, 1986, West Germany)
- The Sandpipers: A&M Gold Series (A&M D25Y3263, 1988, Japan)
- The Sandpipers: Digitally Remastered Best (Universal/A&M 487252, 1998)

=== Soundtracks ===
- The Sterile Cuckoo (Paramount PAS-5009, 1970) - "Come Saturday Morning", "Montage", "End Walk"
- Beyond the Valley of the Dolls (20th Century Fox TFS 4211, 1970) - "Beyond the Valley of the Dolls" (Note: Sandpipers song appears twice as the first and last track on the LP. Multiple CD reissues.)
- Beerfest (Element ABA0098, 2006) - "Enamorado"
- The Wrecking Crew (Rockbeat ROC 3313, 2008) - "Guantanamera"

=== Appearances ===
- Million Dollar Sound Sampler (A&M LP-9001, 1966) - "Strangers in the Night"
- Family Portrait - 16 Outstanding Selections From A&M Records (A&M SP-19002, 1967) - "Fly Me to the Moon" (Note: Released in Australia as The 16 Greats (A&M/Summit SRA250-012) with different cover.)
- As 13 De Sorte (Fermata FB-179, 196?, Brazil) - "Guantanamera", "Strangers in the Night"
- San Remo '68 (CGD FG 5038, 1968, Italy) - "Quando M'Innamoro"
- Armed Forces Radio & Television Station Library (RL 9-8, 1968) - "The French Song", "Bon Soir Dame"
- Jewel Box (A&M SP-19006, 1969) - "Cancion De Amor (Wanderlove)"
- Burt Bacharach & Friends (A&M SP-19007, 1969) - "Where There's a Heartache" (Note: Released in UK in 1970 as Tribute to Burt Bacharach (A&M AMLB 1018) with different cover.)
- Introducing Stereo '70 (A&M AMLB 1002, 1971, UK) - "The Windmills of Your Mind", "Cuando Salí De Cuba"
- Introducing Stereo '71 (RCA/Camden CAM/S-538, 1971, Mexico) - "The Windmills of Your Mind", "Cuando Salí De Cuba"
- 10 Mayfair Hits (A&M/Mayfair SMF66-9885, 197?, Australia) - "Windmills of Your Mind", "The Wind Will Change Tomorrow"
- The Look of Love (Columbia P2 6020, 1973) - "The World Is a Circle"
- The Hamlet Collection (A&M/Hamlet SAMP.8888, 1975) - "Ojos Espanoles" "Yesterday"
- Family Portrait (A&M 86 768 XAT, 1975, Netherlands) - "Just an Old Fashioned Love Song"
- The Best of Louie, Louie (Rhino RNEP 605, 1983) - "Louie, Louie"
- Twelve Great Folk Hits of the Sixties (JCI 3109, 1985) - "Guantanamera"
- This Land Is Our Land: The Pop-Folk Years (Rhino R2 71834, 2003) - "Guantanamera" (Note: Re-recorded version by Jim Brady.)
- A&M Records - History 100 (A&M 90680-4, 2007, Japan, 5-CD Box Set) - "Guantanamera", "Louie Louie", "Come Saturday Morning"

=== Singles ===
Year	Title (A-side / B-side) (Songwriters)	Peak chart positions					Label & cat ref	Album
Year	Title (A-side / B-side) (Songwriters)	US Hot 100	US A/C	UK	CAN	CAN A/C	Label & cat ref	Album
1962	"Once Again" (DeVorzon-Chandler) "White Steeple" (Chandler-McKendry)	—	—	—	—	—	Valiant 6023 (Note: Recorded as The Grads.)	—
1964	"It Happened Once Before" (Troup) "Their Hearts Were Full of Spring"(Troup)	—	—	—	—	—	MGM K13216	—
1964	"The Wild One" (Usher-Christian) "The Cool One" (Mike Curb)	—	—	—	—	—	Mercury 72346	—
1966	"Everything in the Garden" (Greenaway) "Stage Door" (Goffin-King)	—	—	—	—	—	A&M 797	—
1966	"Guantanamera" (Joseíto Fernández) (Note: Label credits "Marti-Angulo-Seeger" based on earlier versions and arrangements.) "What Makes You Dream, Pretty Girl?" (J. Wilson-M. Garson)	9	3	7	10	—	A&M 806 (Note: International releases included Australia (Festival FK-1426), Belgium (London 5.571), Brazil (Fermata 33177), Canada (A&M 082X), Congo (London 55.71), France (Columbia SCRF 964), Germany (London DL 20 953, A&M 210 005, & A&M 14 661 AT), India (A&M 806), Iran (Merica 2027), Ireland (Pye International 7N.25380), Italy (Derby DB 5167, B-side "Angelica"), Jamaica (London American 806), Kenya (Pye 7N.25380), Netherlands (London DL 20953), New Zealand (Festival FK-1426), Nigeria (Pye International 7N.25380), Rhodesia (A&M AM-504), South Africa (A&M AM-504), Spain (A&M/Hispavox H-125, B-side "Louie Louie"), UK (Pye International 7N.25380), Yugoslavia (A&M S-53510).)	Guantanamera
1966	"Louie Louie" (Richard Berry) (Note: Label also has "Spanish lyric by C. Ortega & N. De Caro" in addition to "R. Barry" (sic) songwriter credit.) "Things We Said Today" (Lennon-McCartney)	30 (Note: The October 8, 1966, issue of Billboard magazine reviewed the single in the "Pop Spotlights - Top 60" section saying, "The Kingsmen's former hit is cleverly revived much in the smooth ballad fashion of the Sandpipers' original "Guantanamera." Another winner.")	24	—	29	—	A&M 819 (Note: International releases: Australia (A&M AMK-1548), Canada (A&M 819X), France (London 5.587), Germany (London DL 20 957), Japan (London TOP.1104), Mexico (Tizoc 259 X 45, B-side "Enamorado"), Netherlands (London FLX 3174), Spain (A&M/Hispavox, A-side "Guantanamera"), UK (Pye International 7N.25396)) (Note: A white label promo single was released in Canada (A&M DJ No. 2) with "Enamorado"/"Things We Said Today" and text "Available on A&M album LP-117".)	Guantanamera
1967	"For Baby" (John Denver) (Note: Label credits "H. J. Dutschendorf (sic), Jr.". John Denver's birth name was Henry John Deutschendorf, Jr.) "La Bamba" (Traditional) (Note: Label also has "Adapted by Garson-LiPuma".)	— (Note: Listed (unranked) February 18, 1967 in "Breakout Singles", p. 42.)	31	—	—	—	A&M 835	Guantanamera; The Sandpipers
1967	"Glass" (Sheldon-Marks) "It's Over" (Jimmie Rodgers)	112	—	—	—	—	A&M 851	The Sandpipers
1967	"The French Song" (Pease-Vincent) "Bon Soir Dame" (Bud Dashiell)	— (Note: Listed (unranked) July 22, 1967 in "Spotlight Singles", p. 16.)	20	—	—	—	A&M 861 (Note: Also released with alternate B-side "Rain, Rain Go Away" (Kuiokalani Lee))	The Sandpipers
1967	"Cuando Salí de Cuba" (Luis Aguilé) (Note: LP label credits "Kusik-Snyder" for English narration.) "Softly as I Leave You" (G. Calabrese/H. Shaper/A. De Vita)	—	3	—	—	—	A&M 880	Misty Roses; The Sandpipers
1968	"Quando M'Innamoro (A Man Without Love)" (Livraghi, Mason, Pace, Panzeri) "Wooden Heart" (Wise, Weisman, Twomey, Kaempfert)	124	16	33	—	—	A&M 939 (Note: UK release (A&M 723, 1968) has "I'll Remember You" (Kuiokalani Lee) as B-side.)	Softly; Misty Roses
1968	"Softly" (Gordon Lightfoot) "Cancion De Amor (Wanderlove)" (M. Williams-C. Mapel)	—	39	—	—	—	A&M 968	Softly
1968	"Reason to Believe" (Tim Hardin) "To Put Up with You" (Paul Williams-Roger Nichols)	—	—	—	—	—	A&M AMS 730; UK release	Softly
1968	"Let Go!" (Powell, Gimbel, DeMoraes) "Suzanne" (Leonard Cohen)	— (Note: Listed (unranked) November 2, 1968 in "Spotlight Singles", p. 74.)	36	—	—	—	A&M 997	The Wonder of You; Softly
1969	"The Wonder of You" (Baker Knight) "That Night" (Norman Gimbel-Lalo Schifrin)	—	—	—	—	—	A&M 1044	The Wonder of You
1969	"Temptation" (Arthur Freed-Nacio Herb Brown) "Wave" (Antonio Carlos Jobim)	—	—	—	—	—	A&M 1085	The Wonder of You
1969	"Kumbaya" (Traditional) (Note: Label credits "A. Lawton".) "Yellow Days" (A. Bernstein-A. Carrillo)	—	—	38	—	—	A&M 1116 (Note: UK release (A&M 744, 1969) has "Lo Mucho Que Te Quiero" as B-side.)	The Wonder of You
1969	"Come Saturday Morning" (Fred Karlin/Dory Previn) "Pretty Flamingo" (Mark Barkan)	83	9	—	—	—	A&M 1134	Come Saturday Morning; The Wonder of You
1969	"Hurry to Me" (Fishman-Morricone) (Note: From the movie Metti, una sera a cena.) "Chi Dice Non Dà" (G. Calabrese-V. De Moraes-N. Gimbel-B. Powell) (Note: Also known as "Canto de Ossanha" or "Let Go!".)	—	—	—	—	—	A&M 832; Italy release	—
1970	"Come Saturday Morning" (Fred Karlin/Dory Previn) "To Put Up with You" (Paul Williams-Roger Nichols)	17	5	—	27	13	A&M 1185; 2nd release; alt B-side	Come Saturday Morning; Softly
1970	"Santo Domingo" (Rudy Lindt-Peter Poll-Michael Piano) (Note: "Recitation by Michael Piano" on label.) "Beyond the Valley of the Dolls" (Stu Phillips-Bob Stone)	—	17	—	—	—	A&M 1208 (Note: "Santo Domingo" released in UK (A&M 814, 1970) with "The Drifter" B-side.)	Come Saturday Morning —
1970	"Free to Carry On" (Dale Bobbitt, Jim Brady) "(He's Got the) Whole World in His Hands" (Traditional) (Note: Label has "Negro Spiritual - Arr. & adapted by Bob Alcivar".)	94	11	—	—	1	A&M 1227	Come Saturday Morning
1971	"The Sound of Love" (B. Gibb, R. Gibb, M. Gibb) "The Drifter" (Paul Williams-Roger Nichols)	—	—	—	—	13	A&M 1249	Come Saturday Morning
1971	"Chotto Matte Kudasai (Never Say Goodbye)" (Garner-Nakashima) "Free to Carry On" (Jim Brady-Dale Bobbitt)	— (Note: Listed (unranked) July 31, 1971 in "Spotlight Singles", p. 52.)	—	—	—	—	A&M 1280 (Note: Also released in Japan as A&M AM-97 in 1971. Other Japanese singles: A&M/Top 1254, 1968 ("Quando M'Innamoro"/"Angelique") A&M AM-7, 1970 ("Come Saturday Morning"/"Pretty Flamingo") A&M AM-33, 1970 ("Stasera (sic) Gli Angeli Non Volano (For the Last Time)"/"The Windmills of Your Mind") A&M AM-48, 1970 ("Beyond the Valley of the Dolls"/"Santo Domingo") A&M AM-49, 1970 ("A Song of Joy"/"The Long and Winding Road") A&M AM-68, 1970 ("Today"/"Free to Carry On") A&M AM-127, 1972 ("A Gift of Song"/"An Old Fashioned Love Song")); 2nd release; alt B-side	Come Saturday Morning; A Gift of Song
1971	"Never My Love" (Donald and Richard Addrisi) "Leland Loftis" (D. Bobbitt-J. Brady)	—	—	—	—	—	A&M 1306	A Gift of Song
1971	"A Gift of Song" (Patty Ingalls) "Never My Love" (Donald and Richard Addrisi)	—	—	—	—	—	A&M 1314	A Gift of Song
1972	"Never Can Say Goodbye" (Clifton Davis) "An Old Fashioned Love Song" (Paul Williams)	—	—	—	—	—	A&M 1372	A Gift of Song
1972	"The World Is a Circle" (Bacharach-David) (Note: With the Mitchell Singing Boys. Song is from the film Lost Horizon.) "(Baby I Could Be) So Good at Lovin' You" (Buz Clifford)	—	—	—	—	—	A&M 1388	—
1976	"For the Last Time" (J. Brady) "Down by the River" (Neil Young)	—	—	—	—	—	Satril 111; UK release	Overdue
1976	"Guantanamera" (Joseíto Fernández) (Note: Label has "Trad. arr. J. Marti-H. Angulo-P. Seeger".) (Note: Length is 3:10 on 1976 single and Greatest Hits album vs. 3:00 on 1966 single and album.) "Leland Loftis" (D. Bobbitt-J. Brady)	—	—	—	—	—	A&M 7244; UK release	Greatest Hits; Overdue
1976	"Hang On Sloopy" (Wes Farrell, Bert Russell) "Skidrow Joe" (Brady-Bobbitt)	—	—	32	—	—	Satril 114 (Note: Released in Canada in 1977 by Disques Direction Records (D4-126). Also released on 12” vinyl (DD-8003) with additional 5:08 disco mix of "Hang On Sloopy".); UK release	Overdue
1977	"Life Is a Song Worth Singing" (Bell-Creed) "Island (Without a Name)" (Brady-Bobbitt)	—	—	—	—	—	Satril 118; UK release	Overdue
1977	"Broken Slumber" (Brady-Seeburg) "Living Is a Lovin' Thing" (J. Duncan)	—	—	—	—	—	Satril 119; UK release	Overdue
1978	"It Should Have Lasted Forever" (Benson-Clarke-Hyams) "Darling I Apologise" (Lane-Roberts)	—	—	—	—	—	Satril 127; UK release	—
1979	"You're a Great Way to Fly - Singapore Girl" (Bobby Hart-Fred Bongusto) "You're a Great Way to Fly - Singapore Girl" (instr.) (Fred Bongusto)	—	—	—	—	—	Singapore; Airlines SIA-3	—
Reissues	"Guantanamera" / "Cuando Salí De Cuba"	—	—	—	—	—	A&M 8526	—
Reissues	"Quando M'Innamoro" / "La Bamba"	—	—	—	—	—	A&M 8527	—
Reissues	"Come Saturday Morning" / "The Wonder of You"	—	—	—	—	—	A&M 8544	—
"—" denotes releases that did not chart or were not released in that territory.

== Grammy Awards ==
Year	Category	Nominated work	Result
1967	Best Contemporary (R&R) Group Performance	Guantanamera	Nominated
1967	Best Performance by a Vocal Group	Guantanamera	Nominated

- Photographer Peter Whorf received a 1967 Best Album Cover, Photography nomination for the Guantanamera album cover.
- Composer Fred Karlin received a 1971 Best Score Soundtrack for Visual Media nomination for The Sterile Cuckoo soundtrack which included the Sandpipers' recording of "Come Saturday Morning" and other songs. "Come Saturday Morning" also received a 1970 Academy Award for Best Original Song nomination with the Sandpipers performing it at the 42nd Academy Awards.

== See also ==
- List of folk musicians
- List of former A&M Records artists
- List of artists who have covered The Beatles
