= A Gift of Song (The Sandpipers album) =

Studio album by The Sandpipers
- Released: 1971
- Recorded: Wally Heider Studios, Los Angeles
- Genre: Pop/Rock
- Label: A&M SP 4328 (U.S.)

The Sandpipers chronology
Come Saturday Morning (1970)	A Gift of Song (1971)	Overdue (1976)

A Gift of Song was an LP album by The Sandpipers, released by A&M Records in March 1971 with catalog number SP 4328 in the U.S. and Canada. Other international releases included Germany (A&M 85 870 IT), and the United Kingdom (A&M AMLS 64328). The album was reissued on CD in Japan in 2002 and again in 2014.

The February 12, 1972 issue of Billboard Magazine reviewed the album:

Their sound is beautiful and their sense of quality is superb, this of course aided by top production work by Bones Howe and Bob Alcivar. A programmer's delight, this LP includes "Never Can Say Goodbye," "Never My Love" and the title tune. A particularly strong cut is "Leland Loftis." Should make the Sandpipers once again a big chart group.

The February 26, 1972 issue of Record World commented:

The Sandpipers are crooners with a past, present and future. Here they glide ever-so-softly through songs of fairly recent vintage. Among the pretties made even prettier are "If," "Never My Love," "Never Can Say Goodbye," "How Can You Mend a Broken Heart" and "An Old Fashioned Love Song."

The album was the first by the group not to make the Billboard charts after seven entries from 1966 to 1970. In another first for the group, no singles from the album made the U.S., U.K. or Canadian charts.

Founding member Richard Shoff did not appear on the album.

== Track listing ==
Side One

1. "A Gift of Song" (Patty Ingalls) 3:21
2. "It's Too Late" (Carole King) 3:22
3. "Never My Love" (Don and Dick Addrisi) 2:49
4. "Leland Loftis" (Dale Bobbitt-Jim Brady) 2:44
5. "I Think It's Going to Rain Today" (Randy Newman) 2:55

Side Two

1. "Never Can Say Goodbye" (Clifton Davis) 2:48
2. "How Can You Mend a Broken Heart" (Barry and Robin Gibb) 3:29
3. "An Old Fashioned Love Song" (Paul Williams) 2:49
4. "Chotto Matte Kudasai (Never Say Goodbye)" (Loyal E. Garner-Jeanne Nakashima) 3:19
5. "If" (David Gates) 2:53
6. "A Gift of Song (Reprise)" (Patty Ingalls) 1:39

== Personnel ==
- Guitar: Dennis Budimir, Mike Deasy, Tommy Tedesco
- Bass: Joe Osborn
- Keyboards: Pete Jolly, Larry Knechtel, Michael Omartian
- Drums: Hal Blaine, Paul Humphrey
- Percussion: Larry Bunker, Gary Coleman
- Saxophone: Jim Horn, Bill Perkins
- Horns: Mike Barone, Lew McCreary, Tony Terran, Ray Triscari
- Strings: Arnold Belnick, Jesse Ehrlich, Jim Getzoff,
  Jacob Krachmalnick, William Kurasch, Joy Lyle, Stanley Plummer,
  Ralph Schaeffer, David Schwartz, Sidney Sharp

== Production ==
- Producer: Bones Howe and Bob Alcivar for Mr. Bones Productions, Inc.
- Arranger: Bob Alcivar
- Sound Engineering: Bones Howe at Wally Heider Recording, Hollywood
- Mastering: Frank DeLuna, A&M Studios
- Art Direction: Roland Young
- Front Cover Photography: Jim McCrary
- Album Design and Back Cover Photo: Chuck Beeson
- Special Thanks: Ed Barton, John Golden
- Production Assistant: Pam Vale
