= Roberto Livraghi =

Italian composer and sport manager

- Born: 18 March 1937 (age 88); La Spezia, Kingdom of Italy
- Occupation: Composer

Roberto Livraghi (born 18 March 1937) is an Italian composer and sport manager.

== Life and career ==
Born in La Spezia, had his first success as a composer in 1958, with the Don Marino Barreto Jr.'s song "Maria". His major hit was the song "Quando m'innamoro", which was sung by Anna Identici and by The Sandpipers at the 1968 Sanremo Music Festival. Outside its local success, the song became an international hit, recorded in English by Engelbert Humperdinck and Sergio Franchi, among others, with the title "A Man Without Love", and in French by Joe Dassin with the title "Comment Te Dire?". He also composed songs for, among others, Mina, Adriano Celentano, Ornella Vanoni, Kessler Twins, Marie Laforêt, Cilla Black, Gigliola Cinquetti, Carolyn Franklin, Fred Buscaglione. In the 1970s Livraghi decided to leave the music scene and, after working his father's company in Genoa, he started a new career as a golf manager, which led him to become President of the Italian Golf Federation.
