= Fred Karlin =

American songwriter

- Born: Frederick James Karlin; June 16, 1936; Chicago, Illinois, U.S.
- Died: March 26, 2004 (aged 67); Culver City, California, U.S.
- Occupation: Composer

Frederick James Karlin (June 16, 1936 – March 26, 2004) was an American composer of more than 130 scores for feature films and television movies. He also was an accomplished trumpeter adept at playing jazz, blues, classical, rock, and medieval music.

== Early life and education ==
Karlin was born in Chicago, Illinois. He had a brother, Kenneth.

Karlin began playing jazz trumpet in 1950. He studied jazz composition with William Russo and earned a Bachelor of Arts degree from Amherst College, graduating with honors. His String Quartet No. 2 was his honors thesis.

== Career ==
Following graduation from college, Karlin moved to New York City in 1958. He composed and arranged for various bands, including those of Benny Goodman, Harry James, and Chubby Jackson. During this period he also composed and arranged for documentary films, the Radio City Music Hall orchestra, and television commercials.

In 1962, Karlin scored a record album for Columbia of extracts from the comic strip Peanuts, performed by actress Kaye Ballard as Lucy and songwriter Arthur Siegel as Charlie Brown. The innovative score was performed by Karlin entirely on children's musical instruments and toys.

=== Film and television ===
Karlin began his film career with Up the Down Staircase in 1967. Following in quick succession were Yours, Mine and Ours (1968), The Stalking Moon (1968), The Sterile Cuckoo (1969), The Baby Maker (1970), Cover Me Babe (1970) and Lovers and Other Strangers (1970). For the latter he wrote the music for the song "For All We Know", which won the 1971 Academy Award for Best Original Song and was a Top 10 hit for The Carpenters. The Sandpipers charted with another of his compositions, "Come Saturday Morning". Other Karlin scores were nominated for three Academy Awards, including one for the movie The Little Ark (Based on a novel by Jan de Hartog) in 1972, his wife, Marsha, was also nominated for the same film. His other film scores included The Marriage of a Young Stockbroker (1971), Believe in Me (1971), Every Little Crook and Nanny (1972), Westworld (1973), The Spikes Gang (1974), Chosen Survivors (1974), The Gravy Train (1974), Mixed Company (1974), Mastermind (1976), Baby Blue Marine (1976), Futureworld (1976), Greased Lightning (1977), Man from Atlantis (1977), Mean Dog Blues (1978), California Dreaming (1979), Ravagers (1979), Cloud Dancer (1980), Loving Couples (1980) and Strawberry Road (1991).

However the bulk of Karlin's work was in television. His compositions were nominated for the Emmy Award eleven times, and he won for The Autobiography of Miss Jane Pittman in 1974. Other TV films included The Man Who Could Talk to Kids (1973), Born Innocent (1974), Bad Ronald (1974), The Dream Makers (1975), Dawn: Portrait of a Teenage Runaway (1976), The Trial of Lee Harvey Oswald (1977), Alexander: The Other Side of Dawn (1977), The Death of Richie (1977), Minstrel Man (1977, for which he received an NAACP Image Award), The Hostage Heart (1977), Christmas Miracle in Caufield, U.S.A. (1977), Lucan (1978), The Awakening Land (1978), Strangers: The Story of a Mother and Daughter (1979), Vampire (1979), Sophia Loren: Her Own Story (1980), Miracle on Ice (1981), Bitter Harvest (1981), Inside the Third Reich (1982), Baby Sister (1983), Dadah Is Death (1988), Murder C.O.D. (1990), Her Wicked Ways (1991) and The Secret (1992).

=== Author ===
Karlin wrote three books about film composition, On the Track: A Guide to Contemporary Film Scoring (1990), Listening to Movies: The Film Lover's Guide to Film Music (1994), and 100 Great Film Scores, which was published posthumously in 2005. He also wrote a reference book detailing and cataloguing the thousands of recordings the Edison Company distributed between 1914 and 1929. On the Track has been considered highly influential and authoritative for film and TV composers.

== Personal life ==
Karlin married musician and musicologist Margaret "Meg" Anne (née Stagg) Karlin (a.k.a. Tylwyth Kymry and Meg Welles) in 1963. They recorded three albums together. The couple had two daughters, Wendy Karlin and Kathryn Velasquez, and two sons, Eric and Kristopher and four grandchildren. In 1978, Wendy murdered Kristopher, and she later served a short-term sentence in a mental hospital.. Kristopher's death was a great blow to Fred.

== Death ==
Fred Karlin died at age 67 of cancer in Culver City, California. His widow Meg died July 31, 2016, in West Hollywood, California.
