= The Wonder of You (The Sandpipers album) =

Studio album by The Sandpipers
- Released: May 1969
- Genre: Pop/Rock
- Label: A&M SP 4180 (United States)/AMLS 935 (UK)
- Producer: Allen Stanton

The Sandpipers chronology
Spanish Album (1969)	The Wonder of You (1969)	Greatest Hits (1970)

Alternative cover
- Australia release

Professional ratings
Review scores
Source	Rating
Allmusic	2/5 stars

The Wonder of You was an LP album featuring The Sandpipers, released by A&M Records in May 1969 with catalog number SP 4180. The album was released by A&M in the United Kingdom with the title Kumbaya and catalog number AMLS 935. Other international releases included Australia (World Record Club R02377, different cover), Canada (A&M SP-4180), Germany (A&M 212 066), and Mexico (A&M AML/S-1024, titled La Maravilloso De Ti).

The May 3, 1969 issue of Billboard Magazine reviewed the album:

This album, with the persuasive rhythm of the Sandpipers' singing, is definitive of easy listening at its best. The popular trio's material is no small part of the LP's success, and includes their current single, "The Wonder of You," their not to be imitated version of "Let Go," the Oscar-winning "Windmills of Your Mind," and the much recorded "Yellow Days." Credit producer Allen Stanton and arranger Nick DeCaro for a job very well done.

The May 3, 1969 issue of Record World commented:

Breeze over a sand dune, the faint perfume of grass, fading light. The music of the Sandpipers floats up from South America much of the time and is irresistible. One of the best tunes here is "Let Go." Others are "That Night," "If I Were the Man."

The album reached #194 on the Billboard charts. Two singles from the album made the charts: "Let Go" at #36 on the Billboard Adult Contemporary chart and "Kumbaya" at #38 on the UK singles chart.

== Track listing ==
Side One

1. "Let Go" (Norman Gimbel/Baden Powell) 3:21
2. "That Night (Theme from The Fox)" (Norman Gimbel/Lalo Schifrin) 3:12
3. "Wave" (Antonio Carlos Jobim) 2:32
4. "Yellow Days" (Alan Bernstein/Álvaro Carrillo) 3:03
5. "Lo Mucho Que Te Quiero (The More I Love You)" (Herrero/Ornelas/Ibarra) 3:08
6. "Pretty Flamingo" (Mark Barkan) 2:38

Side Two

1. "The Wonder of You" (Baker Knight) 2:39
2. "Temptation" (Nacio Herb Brown/Arthur Freed) 2:58
3. "The Windmills of Your Mind (Theme from The Thomas Crown Affair)" (Alan Bergman/Marilyn Bergman/Michel Legrand) 2:48
4. "If I Were the Man" (Jimmie Rodgers) 2:59
5. "Kumbaya" (Traditional) 2:43

== Production ==
- Producer: Allen Stanton
- Arranger: Nick DeCaro
- Engineer: Dick Bogert
- Art Direction/Cover Photography: Tom Wilkes
- Album Notes: Derek Taylor

== Reissue ==
The album was combined with Misty Roses in a 2006 CD release by Collectors' Choice Music.
