= Scott Walker discography =

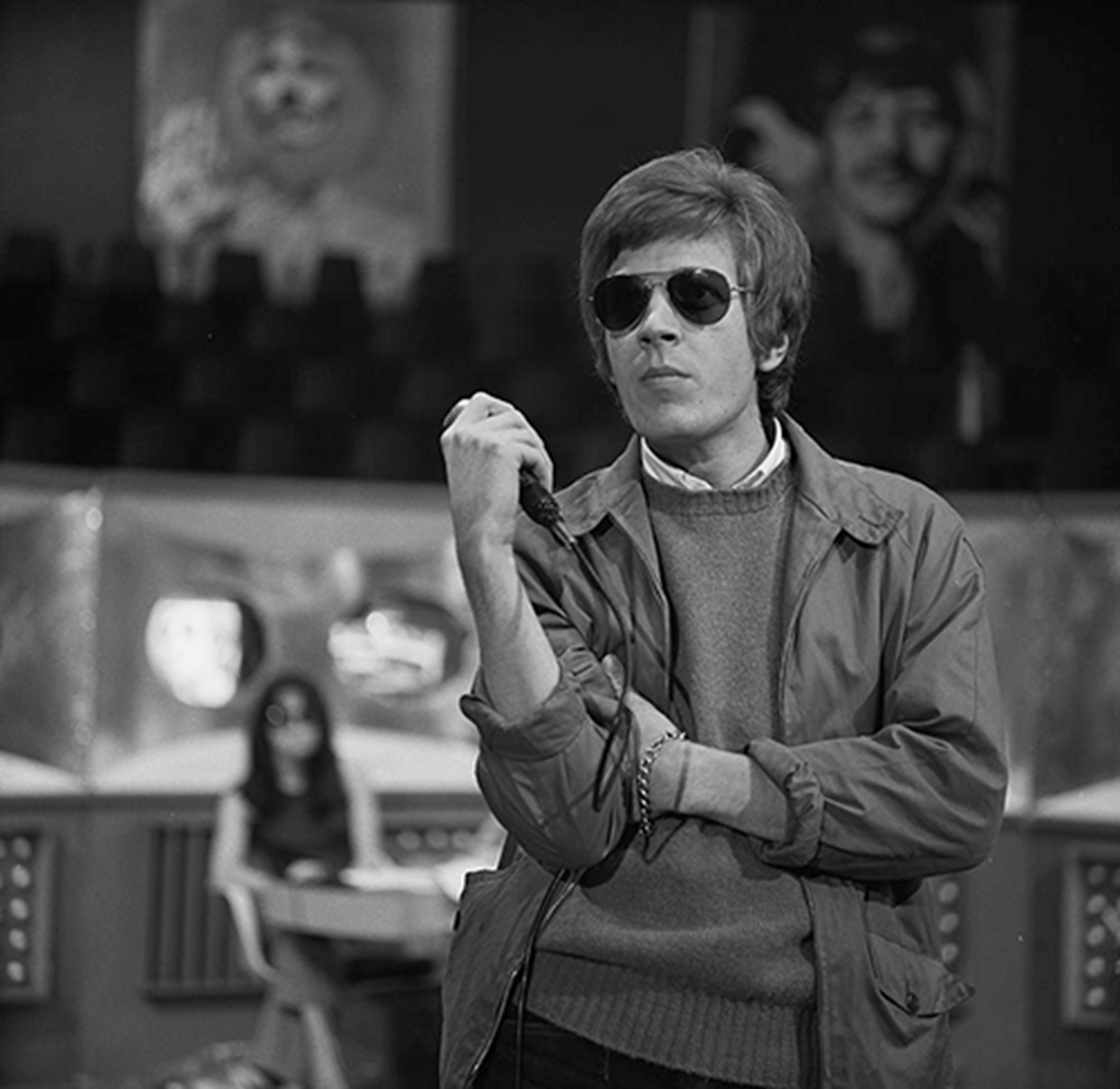
- Studio albums: 15
- Extended plays: 1
- Soundtrack albums: 3
- Compilation albums: 15
- Singles: 15
- Music videos: 4
- Box sets: 2

The American singer-songwriter Scott Walker (1943–2019) was the lead singer for the Walker Brothers as well as a solo artist. He lived in the United Kingdom from the 1960s until his death. The most successful period in his career was from 1965 to 1967 with the Walker Brothers, while five of his first six solo albums from 1967 to 1970 (Scott, Scott 2, Scott 3, Scott 4 and 'Til the Band Comes In) are his most critically-acclaimed and influential works. The first three of these albums were commercially successful, though his mainstream popularity diminished during the time of the last two.

During the first half of the 1970s, he became stuck in a cycle of releasing lacklustre albums of MOR covers. In the mid-1970s Walker reformed the Walker Brothers with mixed results. Their final album together, 1978's Nite Flights, was an artistic breakthrough for Walker, and his subsequent solo albums developed and expanded this new direction. Walker's later albums, starting with 1995's Tilt, are well-regarded among fans of the avant-garde, though they received mixed reception from more rock/pop-orientated listeners and critics.

For a detailed listing of Scott Walker's albums and singles with the Walker Brothers, see the Walker Brothers discography.

== Studio albums ==
Year	Album details	Chart positions			
Year	Album details	UK	BEL	GER	IRL
1967	Scott: Released: August 25, 1967; Labels: Philips Records, Smash Records (US)	3	—	—	—
1968	Scott 2: Released: March 5, 1968; Labels: Philips, Smash (US)	1	—	—	—
1969	Scott 3: Released: March 21, 1969; Labels: Philips, Smash (US)	3	—	—	—
1969	Scott Walker Sings Songs from his T.V. Series: Released: June 20, 1969; Labels: Philips	7	—	—	—
1969	Scott 4: Released: November 7, 1969; Labels: Philips	—	—	—	—
1970	'Til the Band Comes In: Released: December 1970; Labels: Philips	—	—	—	—
1972	The Moviegoer: Released: October 1972; Labels: Philips	—	—	—	—
1973	Any Day Now: Released: May 1973; Labels: Philips	—	—	—	—
1973	Stretch: Released: November 1973; Labels: CBS Records	—	—	—	—
1974	We Had It All: Released: August 1974; Labels: CBS	—	—	—	—
1984	Climate of Hunter: Released: March 1984; Labels: Virgin Records	60	—	—	—
1995	Tilt: Released: May 8, 1995; Labels: Fontana Records, Drag City (US)	27	—	—	—
2006	The Drift: Released: May 8, 2006; Labels: 4AD	51	49	97	80
2012	Bish Bosch: Released: December 3, 2012; Labels: 4AD	95	176	—	—
2014	Soused (with Sunn O)))): Released: October 21, 2014; Labels: 4AD	30	190	85	54
"—" denotes a recording that did not chart or was not released in that territory.

== Soundtrack albums ==
Year	Album details
1999	Pola X: Released: May 17, 1999; Label: Barclay Records
2016	The Childhood of a Leader: Released: August 19, 2016; Label: 4AD
2018	Vox Lux: Released: December 14, 2018; Label: Columbia

== Live albums ==
- Live on Air 1968-1969 (box set) (2019, London Calling)

== Compilation albums ==
- The Best of Scott Volume 1 (1969, Philips)
- The Romantic Scott Walker (1969, Phillips)
- This is Scott Walker (1972, Phillips)
- This is Scott Walker Vol. 2 – Come Next Spring (1973, Phillips)
- Fire Escape in the Sky – The Godlike Genius of Scott Walker (1981, Zoo Records) UK Indie No. 14
- Scott Walker Sings Jacques Brel (1981, Philips)
- The Best of Scott Walker (1982, Philips)
- Boy Child – The Best of 1967–1970 (1990, Polygram Records)
- No Regrets – The Best of Scott Walker and The Walker Brothers 1965–1976 (1992, Polygram) UK No. 4
- It's Raining Today – The Scott Walker Story (1967-1970) (US only 1996, Razor & Tie)
- Scott Walker in 5 Easy Pieces (box set) (2003, Mercury Records)
- The Collection (2004, Spectrum Music)
- Classics & Collectibles (2005, Universal Music Group)
- The Sun Ain't Gonna Shine Anymore – The Best of Scott Walker and The Walker Brothers (2006, Universal) UK No. 24
- The Collection 1967–1970 (box set) (2013, Universal)

== Extended plays ==
Year	EP details
And Who Shall Go to the Ball? And What Shall Go to the Ball?	Released: October 1, 2007; Labels: 4AD

== Singles ==
=== Solo singles 1967–present ===
All non-UK singles list the country of release in brackets. B-sides vary in some territories.

Year	A-side	B-side	Chart positions		Album
Year	A-side	B-side	UK	IE	Album
1967	"Mathilde" (JP)	"My Death"	N/R	N/R	Scott
1967	"Jackie"	"The Plague"	22	—	Scott 2
1968	"I Don't Want To Hear It Anymore" (US) ^{[A]}	"You're All Around Me"	N/R	N/R	Take It Easy (Walker Brothers album)
1968	"Joanna"	"Always Coming Back To You"	7	—	—
1968	"The Rope and the Colt" (FR)	"Concerto pour guitare (Scene d'amour)" ^{[B]}	N/R	N/R	—
1969	"If You Go Away" (JP)	"Two Ragged Soldiers"	N/R	N/R	Scott 3
1969	"Lights of Cincinnati"	"Two Weeks Since You've Gone"	13	20	—
1970	"The Seventh Seal" (JP)	"The Old Man's Back Again"	N/R	N/R	Scott 4
1971	"'Til the Band Comes In" (NL)	"Jean the Machine"	N/R	N/R	'Til the Band Comes In
1971	"Jean the Machine" (JP)	"Joe"	N/R	N/R	'Til the Band Comes In
1971	"Thanks For Chicago Mr. James" (JP)	"The Hills of Yesterday"	N/R	N/R	'Til the Band Comes In
1971	"I Still See You"	"My Way Home"	—	—	—
1972	"The Impossible Dream" (JP)	"The Look of Love"	N/R	N/R	Scott Sings Songs from His T.V. Series
1973	"The Me I Never Knew"	"This Way Mary"	—	—	Any Day Now
1973	"A Woman Left Lonely"	"Where Love Has Died"	—	—	Stretch
1974	"Delta Dawn"	"We Had It All"	—	—	We Had It All
1984	"Track Three"	"Blanket Roll Blues"	—	—	Climate of Hunter
1993	"Man from Reno" (with Goran Bregovic) (FR)	"Indecent Sacrifice" (with Goran Bregovic)	N/R	N/R	—
1995	"Patriot (A Single)" ^{[C]}	"The Cockfighter"	N.A.	N.A.	Tilt
1995	"Tilt" ^{[C]}	"Farmer In The City"	N.A.	N.A.	Tilt

Notes

- A"I Don't Want To Hear It Anymore" was issued as a Scott Walker single in the US by Smash Records. The song and its b-side are actually Walker Brothers songs originally released in 1965 on the trio's début album; Take It Easy with the Walker Brothers.
- B"Concerto pour guitare (Scene d'amour)", the b-side of "The Rope and the Colt", is not a Scott Walker song. It is performed by André Hossein. Walker's A-side and Hossein's b-side were each recorded for from the film Une Corde... Un Colt.
- C"Patriot (A Single)" and "Tilt" are promo singles. They were released to promote Walker's 1995 album; Tilt. There were also respectively titled Scott 1 and Scott 2.

=== Pre-Walker Brothers singles ===
Prior to forming The Walker Brothers, Scott Walker recorded a series of songs under various names, most commonly as Scott Engel. Walker also collaborated with John Stewart in a series of short-lived groups, such as The Moongooners, The Chosen Few, The Newporters, and The Dalton Brothers.

Many of these recordings were later released on compilation albums credited to Scott Walker, including Looking Back with Scott Walker (Ember, 1968) and In the Beginning (Castle, 2001).

- "When is a Boy a Man" b/w "Steady As a Rock" (RKO Unique, 1957) (as Scotty Engel)
- "Livin' End" b/w "Good For Nothin'" (Orbit, 1958) (as Scott Engel)
- "Charley Bop" b/w "All I Do Is Dream Of You" (Orbit, 1958) (as Scott Engel)
- "Bluebell" b/w "Paper Doll" (Orbit, 1958) (as Scott Engel)
- "Golden Rule of Love" b/w "Sunday" (Orbit, 1959) (as Scott Engel)
- "Comin' Home" b/w "I Don't Want to Know" (Orbit, 1959) (as Scott Engel)
- "Take This Love" b/w "Till You Return" (Hi-Fi, 1959) (as Scott Engel)
- "Anything Will Do" b/w "Mr Jones" (Liberty, 1961) (as Scott Engel)
- "Anything Will Do" b/w "Forevermore" (Liberty, 1962) (as Scott Engel)
- "Devil Surfer" b/w "Your Guess" (Challenge, August 1963) (as Scott Engel)
- "Moon Goon Stomp" b/w "Long Trip" (Candix, February 1962) (as The Moongooners)
- "Willie and The Hand Jive" b/w "Moongoon Twist" (Essar, December 1962) (as The Moongooners)
- "Jump Down" b/w "Wish You Were Here" (Marsh, October 1962) (as The Chosen Few)
- "Adventures In Paradise" b/w "Loose Board" (Scotchdown, August 1963) (as The Newporters)
- "I Only Came To Dance With You" b/w "Without Your Love" (Martay, 1963) (as The Dalton Brothers)
- "I Only Came To Dance With You" b/w "Greens" (Tower, 1966) (as Scott Engel and John Stewart, recorded as The Dalton Brothers in 1963)

== Music videos ==
Year	Video	Director
1984	"Track Three"	
1993	"Man From Reno" (with Goran Bregovic)	
2006	"Jesse"	Graham Wood and Ian Freeman
2012	"Epizootics!"	Olivier Groulx
2014	"Brando" (with Sunn O))))	Gisèle Vienne

== Contributions ==
- Cemetery Without Crosses OST (1969) – "The Rope and the Colt"
- The Go-Between OST (1971) – "I Still See You"
- Toxic Affair OST (1993) – "Man From Reno" (with Goran Bregovic)
- To Have And To Hold OST (1996) – "I Threw It All Away"
- The World Is Not Enough OST (1999) – "Only Myself To Blame"
- Plague Songs (2006) – "Darkness"
- Two Suns (2009) – "The Big Sleep" (with Bat for Lashes)

== Production ==
Year	Artist	Title	Notes
1966	Gary Walker	"You Don't Love Me" (Single)	Co-produced with John Stewart
1966	Gary Walker	"Twinkie-Lee" (Single)	Co-produced with John Stewart
1966	The Motions	Their Own Way	
1968	Gary Walker & The Rain	"Spooky" (Single)	
1968	John Walker	"Woman" (Single)	
1968	Terry Smith	Fall Out	
1969	Ray Warleigh	Ray Warleigh's First Album	
1969	John Walker	"Yesterday's Sunshine" (Single)	
1975	The Walker Brothers	No Regrets	Co-produced with Geoff Calver
1976	The Walker Brothers	Lines	Co-produced with Geoff Calver
1978	The Walker Brothers	Nite Flights	Co-produced with Dave MacRae
1984	Scott Walker	Climate of Hunter	Co-produced with Peter Walsh
1995	Scott Walker	Tilt	Co-produced with Peter Walsh
1999	Various artists	Pola X	
2000	Ute Lemper	Punishing Kiss	"Scope J" and "Lullaby (By-By-By)" only, both co-produced with Peter Walsh
2001	Pulp	We Love Life	Co-Produced with Peter Walsh
2006	Scott Walker	The Drift	Co-produced with Peter Walsh
2006	Various artists	Plague Songs	"Darkness" only, co-produced with Peter Walsh
2007	Scott Walker	And Who Shall Go to the Ball? And What Shall Go to the Ball? (EP)	Co-produced with Peter Walsh
2008	Acoustic Ladyland	"Salt Water (Scott Walker Mix)" (Single)	
2012	Scott Walker	Bish Bosch	Co-Produced with Peter Walsh
2014	Scott Walker & Sunn O)))	Soused	Co-Produced with Peter Walsh
2016	Scott Walker	The Childhood of a Leader	Co-Produced with Peter Walsh
2018	Various artists	Vox Lux	10 of the 20 tracks

== Tribute albums ==
- Angel of Ashes: A Tribute to Scott Walker (2005, Tansformadores)
- Scott Walker: 30 Century Man (May 26, 2009, Lakeshore Records)
- Songs from Montague Terrace (September 16, 2013, All Souls Music)
