= Fire Escape in the Sky: The Godlike Genius of Scott Walker =

Compilation album by Scott Walker
- Released: 28 August 1981
- Recorded: 1967–1970
- Genre: Orchestral pop
- Length: 47:58
- Label: Zoo Records
- Producer: John Franz with Peter Olliff (tracks 4, 5 and 8)

Scott Walker chronology
We Had It All (1974)	Fire Escape in the Sky: The Godlike Genius of Scott Walker (1981)	Scott Walker Sings Jacques Brel (1981)

Fire Escape in the Sky: The Godlike Genius of Scott Walker is a compilation album of material by singer Scott Walker, compiled by musician Julian Cope and released by independent Zoo Records (catalogue no. Zoo Two) in August 1981. The material on the album was drawn from Walker's orchestral pop solo albums released between 1967 and 1970, and focuses on songs that the singer had written himself. After Walker's popularity declined in the 1970s and his albums became out-of-print, Cope conceived the album to rescue Walker from obscurity and present his material to a new audience. Whereas he had previously appealed to middle-of-the-road fans, the compilation was created to help promote Walker to a post-punk audience.

The album's title, Fire Escape in the Sky, is taken from the lyrics of the song "Big Louise" from Walker's album Scott 3, while according to Cope in the 30 Century Man documentary, the album's plain, neutral grey sleeve was designed to allow people to enjoy Walker's music without feeling they were buying into "some dodgy '60s MOR icon". The compilation reached number 14 in the UK Independent Chart and helped find Walker a new audience, and ultimately contributed to a reappraisal of the singer's material. Walker, who had retired in 1978, resurfaced with new material in 1984.

== Background ==
After achieving commercial success as a member of pop group The Walker Brothers in the 1960s, Walker continued to be successful in the United Kingdom when launching his solo career in the late 1960s, which was defined by the singer's unusual blend of morose, idiosyncratic lyrics and orchestrated arrangements which helped him appeal to MOR audiences. His earliest albums, which largely combined original songs with cover versions, reached the top three of the UK Albums Chart, although his fourth eponymous album–the first comprising entirely original compositions–was a commercial disappointment which saw the decline of the singer's success, and in the first half of the 1970s, his label Philips demanded Walker release only "commercial" albums comprising show tunes and film and television themes in failed attempts to restore his commercial momentum. The singer then reunited with the Walker Brothers, with whom he released his first new compositions for eight years on Nite Flights (1978), which saw him move into a more experimental direction, but by the time of Fire Escape in the Sky, the singer's final public appearance was on the Walker Brothers' final tour in 1978.

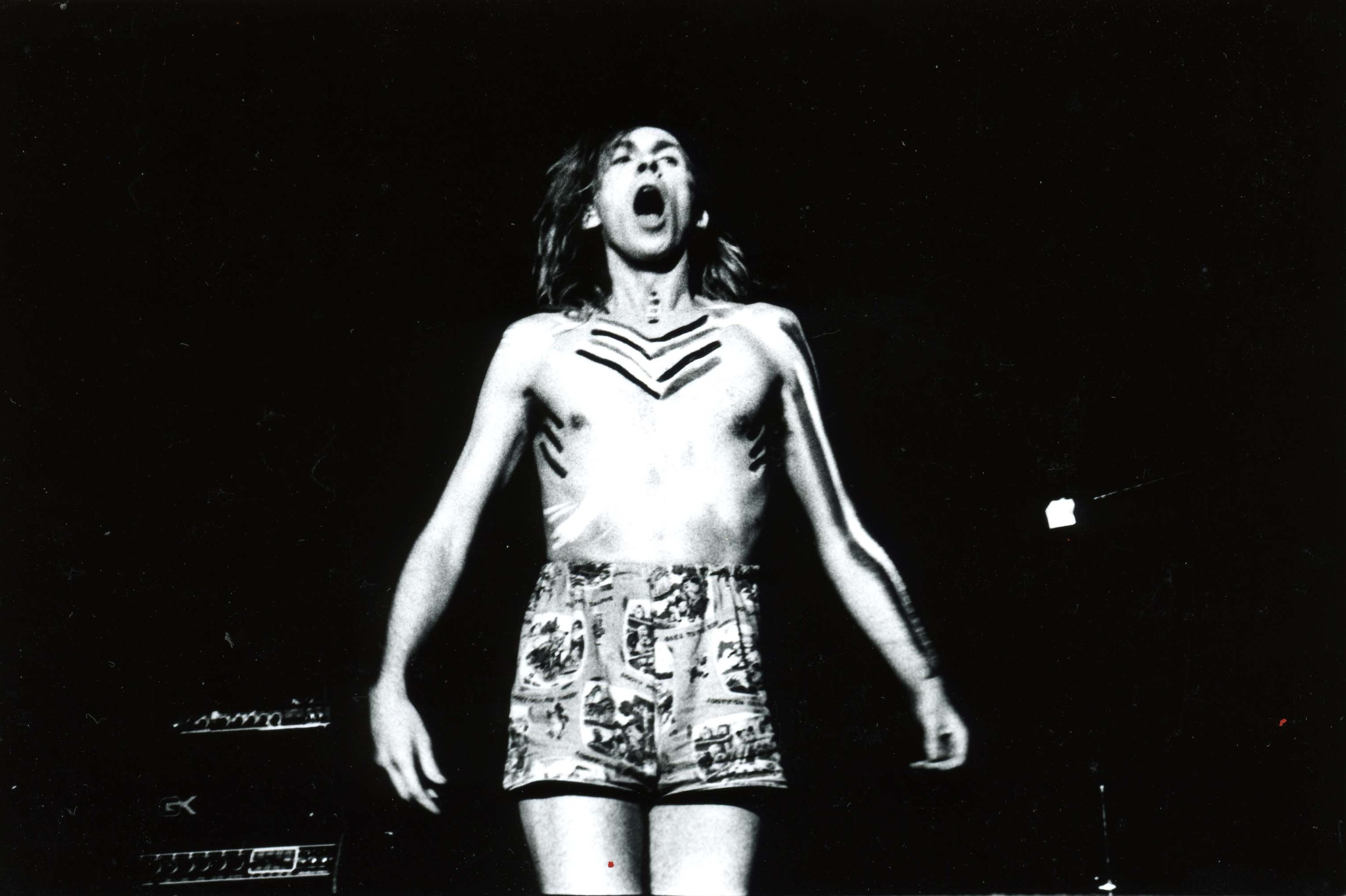
Julian Cope in the 1980s

By 1981, Walker's solo material was out of print and unavailable, and had become obscure and overlooked; Bob Stanley wrote that Walker's solo work "was remembered, if at all, as a brief postscript to the Walker Brothers' hit run." The record label trend of re-issuing previously released material was in its infancy at the turn of the 1980s, with hits compilations gaining popularity but groundbreaking compilations of material by such bands as the Action, Merseybeats, Big Three and Creation only having just been released.

Musician and singer Julian Cope, front man of the popular post-punk band the Teardrop Explodes, conceived and compiled Fire Escape in the Sky: The Godlike Genius of Scott Walker. After his band scored hits with "Reward" and "Treason", Cope had developed a tendency to champion his favourite neglected or long-overlooked performers to the music press, including obscure psychedelia and krautrock bands as well as solo singers such as Don Covay, with Walker fitting into the latter category. Cope was introduced to Walker's music by Teardrop Explodes keyboardist Paul Simpson, who went on to front his own Walker-indebted band, The Wild Swans. Over the preceding years when Walker's albums were out-of-print, Cope had repeatedly purchased them in Liverpool and Birmingham for prices between 80p and £1.20, and gave them to "friends and/or anyone who would listen."

To realise the compilation, Cope talked Zoo Records, a Liverpool-based independent label run by his friend Bill Drummond, into licensing a number of original compositions from the unavailable Scott Walker albums released by Philips. He felt that, by 1981, Walker had become "utterly lost in terms of culture" due to him including "MOR slop" on his first three albums, culminating with Scott 3 (1969), and felt potential consumers may have been discouraged by the middle-of-the-road material, also noting that Walker's subsequent compilations "pushed his 'housewife' appeal and totally ignored the really great compositions." It was with Fire Escape in the Sky that he hoped to alter Walker's image and introduce his 1960s music to a new audience.

== Content ==
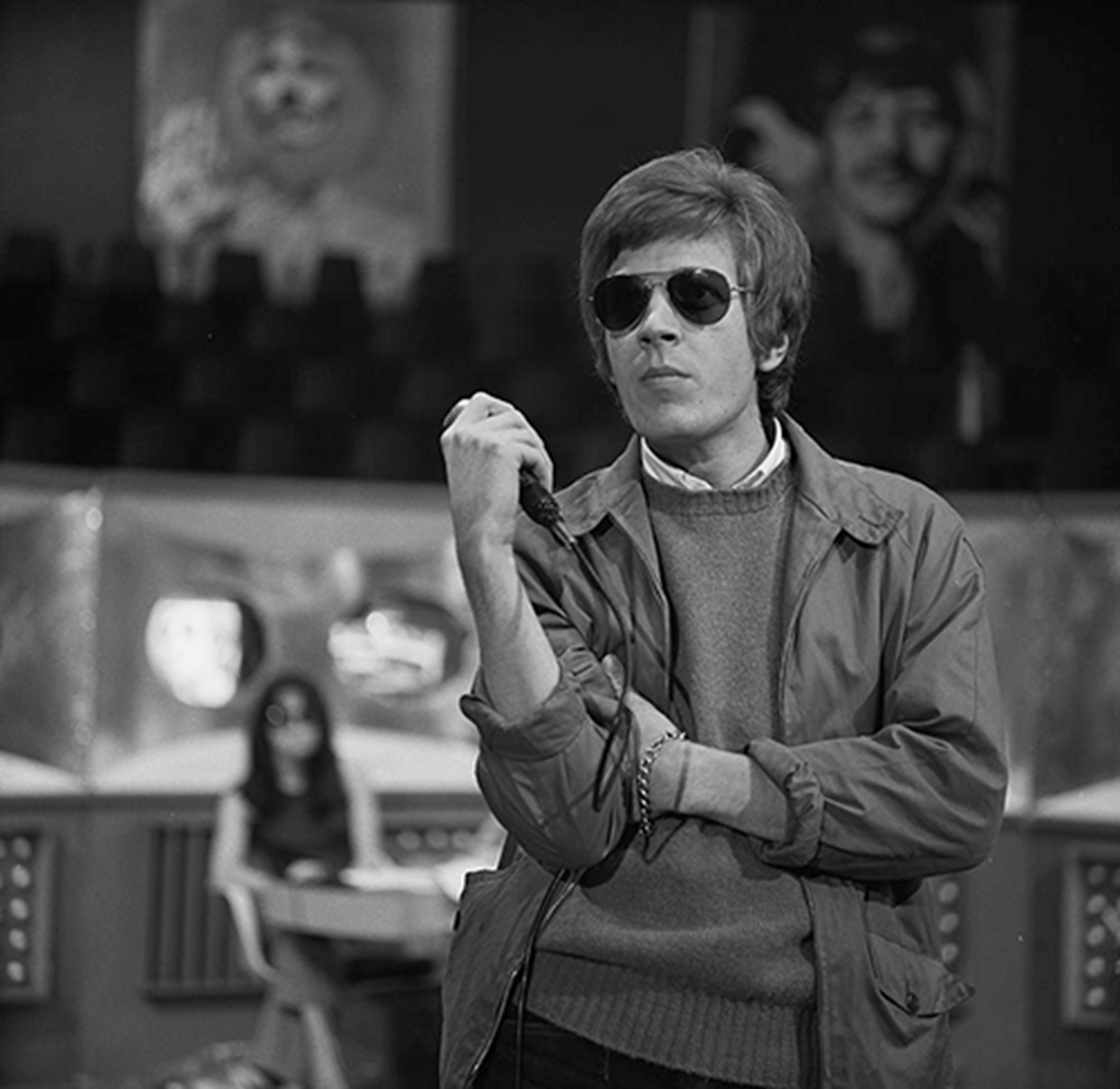
Scott Walker in 1968

Focusing on Walker's orchestral pop material, the songs on Fire Escape in the Sky are all written by Walker and are drawn from the records Scott (1967), Scott 2 (1968), Scott 3 (1969), Scott 4 (originally released under the name Scott Engel, 1969) and 'Til the Band Comes In (1970). Half the tracks are arranged by Angela Morley (who arranged most of Walker's originals in this period, including all the ones on Scott 3 and 'Til the Band Comes In), with the others handled by Peter Knight or Reg Guest. Bob Stanley of The Guardian described the songs chosen for the album as "12 tales of broken affairs inspired by and aspiring to the great European cinema of the 50s and 60s." According to Walker biographier Paul Woods, "[i]t was as if a forgotten and almost forbidden part of pop music's golden sixties era had been preserved only in this one slightly shabby artefact." The title Fire Escape in the Sky refers to a lyric from the Scott 3 song "Big Louise". Walker later admitted to being embarrassed by the subtitle, The Godlike Genius of Scott Walker.

The obscure album cover, which resembled felt, was plain grey in colour, and featured nothing else besides the album title rendered in small, ornate, olive-green typography. The simplicity of the cover, complete with its "almost illegible text", made the compilation seem unappealing to several purchasers. Cope, who described the cover as a "grey post-punk photograph-free design," explained that it was intended to allow listeners to enjoy the album "without feeling they were buying into some dodgy 60s MOR icon." The sleeve contained no photographs of Walker, and the back cover instead features an empty space in place of a photograph which never appeared in time for printing, although this and the minimal cover served to "underline the sense of mystery and absence now surrounding the artist." The sleeve also contained very little information, with a complete absence of sleeve notes. Stanley noticed how "Cope was smart enough to unlock the door and walk away – after that you were on your own."

== Release and reception ==
Professional ratings
Review scores
Source	Rating
The Encyclopedia of Popular Music	4/5 stars

Zoo Records released Fire Escape in the Sky on 28 August 1981, and it reached number 14 in the UK Independent Chart. Walker, who had a noted dislike of listening to his early material, was sent the compilation, and later told the NME that he was impressed by "this young guy singin'." He felt the music was "not bad" but also felt that one play "was enough". Fire Escape in the Sky was ultimately one of only two albums that Zoo Records released, the other being a compilation of the label's singles entitled To the Shores of Lake Placid. By focusing on singles and releasing few albums, Zoo established its catalogue as "a micro-regional representation of the local talent," as was Drummond's intention. The compilation was nonetheless deleted early in its run after Zoo had failed to pay royalties to Philips and Polygram.

According to biographer Rob Young, Fire Escape in the Sky was critically acclaimed upon release. Among retrospective reviews, Stuff wrote that the compilation "made plain, in its notoriously obscure sleeve (no picture, precious little information), just why Scott was such a big deal." In The Rough Guide to Rock, Alan Clayson recommends the compilation to those trying to familiarise themselves to Walker's material. In 2017, Martin Aston of The Vinyl Factory included the compilation in his list "An introduction to Scott Walker in 10 records." He felt that Cope's selections were "immaculate", and wrote that "when [Walker's] greatest songs were aligned, the godlike genius of Scott Walker – his sad, strange, complex and lonely genius – was plain to hear."

== Legacy ==
The first introduction to Walker's material in the aftermath of punk rock, Fire Escape in the Sky initiated a revival of interest for the singer, and his work became reappraised. It won him a new audience, including a younger generation of music journalists who discovered his 1960s solo albums and reappraised them as underrated. Martin Aston of The Vinyl Factory wrote that the album "chimed more with the post-punk, Bowie-influenced" audience than it did to Walker's previous fan base. Regarding the album's attempt to reintroduce Walker to music fans, Cope explained that he felt "the job was done" and was pleased that Walker's solo career "was reclaimed to such an extent," telling Stephen Kijak, director of the 30 Century Man documentary, that he was also pleased that Fire Escape in the Sky had been recognised as the album which "started the deluge."

Donald Clarke of The Irish Times described the compilation—compiling material from Walker's then-deleted "greatest records"—as one of Cope's "gifts to the world". Biographer Rob Young wrote that Cope had rescued Walker "from the mists of critical oblivion". Les Inrockuptibles founder J. D. Beauvallet, who proved pivotal in helping spread interest in Walker's music in the 1990s, wrote that the interest placed on Walker by "punk generation" figures like Julian Cope and Echo & the Bunnymen helped pique his own interest in the singer.

To keep up the momentum of Walker's legacy, Phonogram released the compilation Scott Walker Sings Jacques Brel, consisting of cover versions of Jacques Brel songs that also appeared on Walker's late 1960s solo albums. Within two years of the release of Fire Escape in the Sky, Walker signed a deal with Virgin Records, and in 1984 he resurfaced with the experimental album Climate of Hunter, containing his first material since the compilation. Furthering Walker's appeal into the CD era, the compilation Boy Child: The Best of Scott Walker 1967–1970, which was in a similar vein to Fire Escape in the Sky, was released in 1990 with sleeve notes by Marc Almond.

Musician and writer Bob Stanley discovered Fire Escape in the Sky as a 16-year-old and, writing for The Guardian, called it his favourite album. He felt the compilation was "an act of extraordinary generosity and selflessness" on Cope's part, and wrote that "[t]he scope of this new pop – presented by Cope just as new pop was starting to dominate the charts – is ridiculous, unprecedented." He called the album "an artefact that is a distinctive blend of pop fandom, mystique and skyscraping ambition." Stanley once again mentioned the compilation in a list of his favourite albums for The Quietus, where he wrote that the idea of a compilation of a similar impetus would be "unthinkable now". He said of the "quite life-changing" compilation: "[Angela Morley's] arrangements have never been beaten, the lyrics were so filmic, and Scott's voice was beautiful, of course. Hearing songs like 'Montague Terrace' and 'Angels Of Ashes' for the first time, imagine that."

== Track listing ==
All tracks are written by Scott Engel, except where noted.

Side one
No.	Title	Writer(s)	Length
1.	"Such a Small Love"		4:53
2.	"Big Louise"		3:07
3.	"Little Things (That Keep Us Together)"	Scott Walker, Ady Semel	2:18
4.	"Plastic Palace People"		6:06
5.	"Girls From the Streets"		4:10
6.	"It's Raining Today"		3:55

Side two
No.	Title	Length
7.	"Seventh Seal"	4:55
8.	"The Amorous Humphrey Plugg"	4:29
9.	"Angels of Ashes"	4:18
10.	"Boychild"	3:35
11.	"Montague Terrace (In Blue)"	3:28
12.	"Always Coming Back to You"	2:40

=== Notes ===
- "Such a Small Love", "Montague Terrace (in Blue)" and "Always Coming Back to You" are from Scott (1967).
- "Plastic Palace People", "Girls From the Streets" and "The Amorous Humphrey Plugg" are from Scott 2 (1968).
- "Big Louise" and "It's Raining Today" are from Scott 3 (1969).
- "Seventh Seal", "Angels of Ashes" and "Boychild" are from Scott 4 (1969).
- "Little Things" is from 'Til the Band Comes In (1970).

== Personnel ==
Adapted from the liner notes of Fire Escape in the Sky

- Julian Cope – compiler
- Martyn Atkins – typography

== Release history ==
Country	Date	Label	Format	Catalog
United Kingdom	1981	Zoo Records	Vinyl	Zoo Two

== Charts ==
Chart	Position
UK Independent Chart	14
