= It's Raining Today: The Scott Walker Story (1967–70) =

Compilation album by Scott Walker
- Released: October 15, 1996
- Genre: Pop rock
- Length: 58:12
- Label: Razor & Tie
- Producer: Johnny Franz

Scott Walker chronology
Tilt (1995)	It's Raining Today: The Scott Walker Story (1967–70) (1996)	Pola X (1999)

It's Raining Today: The Scott Walker Story (1967–70) is a compilation album of songs by the American-born British singer-songwriter Scott Walker, released on October 15, 1996, on Razor & Tie. The album consists of seventeen songs taken from Walker's first five studio albums, and was Walker's first solo album to be released in the United States. Marshall Crenshaw compiled the album's tracks and spent a year and a half convincing Razor & Tie to release it.

== Critical reception ==
In a review of It's Raining Today for The New York Times, Neil Strauss wrote, "Though the collection may seem schmaltzy to the casual listener, further exploration unveils an indelible, melancholy beauty, with each track a rigorously orchestrated excavation into a different recess of human despair and loneliness." Writing in Pitchfork in 2004, Scott Plagenhoef wrote that the compilation was "far too Spartan and scattershot to be recommended". Wilson Neate wrote in Trouser Press that the album "...isn’t quite as solid an introduction as Boy Child, but it does offer a marginally stronger selection of tracks from 'Til the Band Comes In." Robert Christgau gave the album a C− grade, describing Walker as "...Anthony Newley without the voice muscles, "MacArthur Park" as light-programme boilerplate, a male Vera Lynn for late bloomers who found Paul McCartney too r&b."

Professional ratings
Review scores
Source	Rating
AllMusic	3/5 stars
The Encyclopedia of Popular Music	4/5 stars
The Rolling Stone Album Guide	2.5/5 stars
The Village Voice	C–

== Track listing ==
All tracks are written by Scott Walker except where noted.

No.	Title	Length
1.	"Big Louise"	3:12
2.	"Jackie" (Jacques Brel, Gerard Jouannest, Mort Shuman)	3:22
3.	"The World's Strongest Man"	2:20
4.	"It's Raining Today"	4:01
5.	"Montague Terrace (In Blue)"	3:28
6.	"Through a Long and Sleepless Night" (Mack Gordon, Alfred Newman)	4:11
7.	"Next" (Jacques Brel, Mort Shuman)	2:50
8.	"The Seventh Seal"	4:56
9.	"Plastic Palace People"	6:06
10.	"Rosemary"	3:24
11.	"The Old Man's Back Again (Dedicated to the Neo-Stalinist Regime)"	3:42
12.	"Joe" (Ady Semel, Scott Walker)	3:41
13.	"Lights of Cincinnati" (Tony Macaulay)	3:21
14.	"Cowbells Shakin'" (Ady Semel, Scott Walker)	1:05
15.	"Thanks for Chicago Mr. James" (Ady Semel, Scott Walker)	2:17
16.	"Little Things (That Keep Us Together)" (Ady Semel, Scott Walker)	2:19
17.	"Joanna" (Tony Hatch, Jackie Trent)	3:57
Total length:		58:12
