= 5 Easy Pieces =

Box set by Scott Walker
- Released: 24 November 2003
- Recorded: 1964–1995
- Genre: Various
- Length: 345:54
- Label: Mercury Records
- Producer: Various

Scott Walker chronology
Pola X (1999)	5 Easy Pieces (2003)	The Drift (2006)

Professional ratings
Review scores
Source	Rating
Allmusic	4/5 stars
The Guardian	3/5 stars
The Independent	4/5 stars
The Observer	favourable
Pitchfork	(9.5/10)
The Daily Telegraph	favourable
The Times	favourable

5 Easy Pieces is a box set anthology of the career (to 2003) of Scott Walker. It was released in November 2003. The set comprises five themed CDs and a 56-page booklet.

== Track listing ==
All tracks written by Scott Walker, unless otherwise noted. (NB: Walker is sometimes credited as Scott Engel or N. S. Engel; these instances are noted as such in the listing.) All tracks performed by Scott Walker, except † by The Walker Brothers, ‡ by Ute Lemper, and 2.16 by Esther Ofarim .

=== CD 1: In My Room ===
The complete bedsit dramas, including the kitchen sink

1. "Prologue/Little Things" – 3:39 (Scott Walker, Ady Semel)
2. "I Don't Want To Hear It Anymore" † – 3:45 (Randy Newman)
3. "In My Room" † – 2:32 (Joaquin Prieto, translated by Lee Julien Pockriss and Paul Vance)
4. "After the Lights Go Out" † – 4:06 (John Stewart)
5. "Archangel" † – 3:41
6. "Orpheus" † – 3:24
7. "Mrs Murphy" – 3:19
8. "Montague Terrace (In Blue)" – 3:27
9. "Such A Small Love" – 4:52
10. "The Amorous Humphrey Plugg" – 4:29
11. "It's Raining Today" – 3:59
12. "Rosemary" – 3:20
13. "Big Louise" – 3:08
14. "Angels Of Ashes" – 4:19
15. "Hero Of The War" – 2:24
16. "Time Operator" – 3:36 (Walker, Semel)
17. "Joe" – 3:40 (Walker, Semel)
18. "The War Is Over (Sleepers-Epilogue)" – 3:36 (Walker, Semel)

=== CD 2: Where's The Girl? ===
Songs of a Lady, Love and Loss

1. "Where's The Girl?" † – 3:11 (Jerry Leiber, Mike Stoller)
2. "You're All Around Me" † – 2:37 (Scott Walker, Lesley Duncan)
3. "Just Say Goodbye" † – 3:36 (Petula Clark, Pierre Delanoë, Tony Hatch)
4. "Hurting Each Other" † – 2:42 (Peter Udell, Gary Geld)
5. "Genevieve" † – 2:51
6. "Once Upon A Summertime" † – 3:50 (Eddie Marnay, Eddie Barclay, Michel Legrand, translated by Johnny Mercer)
7. "When Joanna Loved Me" – 3:07 (Robert Wells, Jack Segal)
8. "Joanna" – 3:52 (Tony Hatch, Jackie Trent)
9. "Angelica" – 4:00 (Cynthia Weil, Barry Mann)
10. "Always Coming Back To You" – 2:36
11. "The Bridge" – 2:47
12. "Best Of Both Worlds" – 3:13 (Melvin R London, Don Black)
13. "Two Weeks Since You've Gone" – 2:45
14. "On Your Own Again" – 1:45
15. "Someone Who Cared" – 2:57
16. "Long About Now" (sung by Esther Ofarim) – 2:05 (Walker, Semel)
17. "Scope J" ‡ – 10:50 (N. S. Engel)
18. "Lullaby (by-by-by)" ‡ – 11:05 (N. S. Engel)

=== CD 3: An American In Europe ===
Home and away: songs from Europe and America

1. "Jackie" – 3:20 (Mort Shuman, Jacques Brel, Gérard Jouannest)
2. "Mathilde" – 2:36 (Shuman, Brel, Jouannest)
3. "The Girls And The Dogs" – 3:07 (Shuman, Brel, Jouannest)
4. "Amsterdam" – 3:04 (Brel, Shuman)
5. "Next" – 2:49 (Brel, Shuman)
6. "The Girls From The Streets" – 4:08
7. "My Death" – 4:56 (Brel, Shuman)
8. "Sons Of" – 3:43 (Brel, Shuman, Jouannest)
9. "If You Go Away" – 4:58 (Jacques Brel, Rod McKuen)
10. "Copenhagen" – 2:24
11. "We Came Through" – 1:56
12. "30 Century Man" – 1:27
13. "Rhymes Of Goodbye" – 3:04
14. "Thanks For Chicago Mr James" – 2:15 (Walker, Semel)
15. "Cowbells Shakin'" – 1:05 (Walker, Semel)
16. "My Way Home" – 3:28 (Walker, Semel)
17. "Lines" † – 3:26 (Jerry Fuller)
18. "Rawhide" – 3:50
19. "Blanket Roll Blues" – 3:12 (Tennessee Williams, Kenyon Hopkins)
20. "Tilt" – 5:05
21. "Patriot (a single)" – 7:59

=== CD 4: This Is How You Disappear ===
The darkest hour is just before dawn: 15 big hits

1. "The Plague" – 3:34
2. "Plastic Palace People" – 6:05
3. "Boy Child" – 3:37
4. "Shutout" † – 2:46 (Scott Engel)
5. "Fat Mama Kick" † – 2:52 (Scott Engel)
6. "Nite Flights" † – 4:20 (Scott Engel)
7. "The Electrician" † – 6:01 (Scott Engel)
8. "Dealer" – 5:08
9. "Track 3" a.k.a. "Delayed" – 3:42
10. "Sleepwalkers Woman" – 4:11
11. "Track 5" a.k.a. "It's A Starving" – 3:32
12. "Farmer In The City" – 6:35 (Scott Walker, Pete Walsh)
13. "The Cockfighter" – 5:58
14. "Bouncer See Bouncer..." – 8:34
15. "Face On Breast" – 5:14

=== CD 5: Scott On Screen ===
Music from and for films

1. "Light" – 3:20
2. "Deadlier Than The Male" † – 2:32
3. "The Rope and the Colt" (Andre Hossein, Hal Shapper) – 2:01
4. "Meadow" – 1:24
5. "The Seventh Seal" – 4:58
6. "The Darkest Forest" – 5:44
7. "The Ballad of Sacco and Vanzetti" – (Theme from Sacco e Vanzetti) (Joan Baez, Ennio Morricone) – 3:32
8. "Theme from Summer of '42 (The Summer Knows)" - (Alan Bergman, Marilyn Bergman, Michel Legrand)" – 3:20
9. "Glory Road" (The Theme from W.U.S.A.) (Neil Diamond) – 3:32
10. "Isabel" – 6:39
11. "Man From Reno" (Scott Walker, Goran Bregović) – 4:21
12. "The Church of the Apostles" – 5:50
13. "Indecent Sacrifice" (Walker, Bregović) – 4:07
14. "Bombupper" – 0:52
15. "I Threw It All Away" (Bob Dylan) – 2:20
16. "River of Blood" – 1:25
17. "Only Myself to Blame" (Don Black, David Arnold) – 3:38
18. "Running" – 1:44
19. "The Time Is Out of Joint!" – 1:09
20. "Never Again" – 1:27
21. "Closing" – 1:53
