= Scott Walker Sings Jacques Brel =

Compilation album by Scott Walker
- Released: 1981
- Recorded: 1967–1970
- Length: 31:59 (CD)
- Label: Philips Records

Scott Walker chronology
Fire Escape in the Sky: The Godlike Genius of Scott Walker (1981)	Scott Walker Sings Jacques Brel (1981)	Climate of Hunter (1984)

Professional ratings
Review scores
Source	Rating
AllMusic	4/5 stars

Scott Walker Sings Jacques Brel is a compilation of Jacques Brel compositions recorded by American-British singer-songwriter Scott Walker, released in 1981 by Philips Records. The compilation brings together all of the Brel material that Walker covered on record during the period of 1967 to 1969. Walker additionally performed five Brel songs on his television series, including "Alone", another Brel/Shuman composition. None of these live recordings were released on the accompanying soundtrack.

The original 1981 release included the Walker composition "Little Things (That Keep Us Together)" from 'Til the Band Comes In (1970). The 1990 CD re-release only includes the nine Brel compositions.

Justin Farrar of Rhapsody praised the album, calling it one of the streaming service's favorite covers albums.

== Track listing ==
All tracks are written by Jacques Brel, Gérard Jouannest and Mort Shuman, unless otherwise noted.

Side one
No.	Title	Writer(s)	Original release	Length
1.	"Jackie"		Scott 2 (1968)
2.	"Next"	Brel, Shuman	Scott 2
3.	"The Girls and the Dogs"		Scott 2
4.	"If You Go Away"	Brel, Rod McKuen	Scott 3 (1969)
5.	"Funeral Tango"		Scott 3

Side two
No.	Title	Writer(s)	Original release	Length
1.	"Mathilde"		Scott (1967)
2.	"Amsterdam"	Brel, Shuman	Scott
3.	"Sons Of"		Scott 3
4.	"My Death"	Brel, Shuman	Scott
5.	"Little Things (That Keep Us Together)"	Scott Walker, Ady Semel	'Til the Band Comes In (1970)

== Personnel ==
- Wally Stott – orchestral director (1, 2, 4, 6–8, 10)
- Reg Guest – orchestral director (3, 9)
- Peter Knight – orchestral director (5)
- John Franz – producer
- Peter Olliff – engineer
- Fred Dellar – liner notes

== Release details ==
Country	Date	Label	Format	Catalog
United Kingdom	1981	Philips Records	Vinyl	6359 090
United Kingdom	1990	Fontana	CD	838 212-2
