= Boy Child: The Best of Scott Walker 1967–1970 =

Compilation album by Scott Walker
- Released: 1990; June 5, 2000 (re-issue)
- Recorded: 1967–1970
- Genres: Pop music, baroque pop
- Length: 68:04 (CD/Cassette); 50:08 (LP); 70:24 (HDCD)
- Labels: Polygram, Fontana Records
- Producers: John Franz, Peter Olliff

Scott Walker chronology
Climate of Hunter (1984)	Boy Child: The Best of Scott Walker 1967–1970 (1990)	No Regrets – The Best of Scott Walker and The Walker Brothers 1965–1976 (1992)

Professional ratings
Review scores
Source	Rating
Allmusic	4.5/5 stars
Select	5/5 medals

Boy Child: The Best of 1967–1970 is a compilation album by the singer-songwriter Scott Walker. It was released in 1990. The album compiles music that Walker both wrote and recorded on five of his first six studio albums; Scott (1967), Scott 2 (1968), Scott 3 (1969), Scott 4 (1969) and 'Til the Band Comes In (1970). The original release also includes the non-Walker composition "The Rope and The Colt", a French single recorded by the singer for the 1969 film Une corde, un colt. Also included was the 1967 b-side "The Plague".

In 2000 the album was re-released under the altered title Boy Child: 67–70 on HDCD with modified track listing and running order. The new version dropped "The Rope and The Colt" and added the Scott 4 track "Angels of Ashes".

An expanded double LP version was released on Record Store Day in 2022 which added “Always Coming Back to You”, “30th Century Man,” and “Angels of Ashes,” and restored “The Rope and the Colt.” The album artwork included the original Marc Almond liner notes from 1990, Neil Hannon’s contribution from 2000, and exclusive brand-new notes from Jarvis Cocker. It was released a limited edition of 2500 pressed on 180g white vinyl.

== Track listing ==
=== Boy Child: The Best of 1967–1970 (1990) CD/Cassette ===
All tracks are written by Noel Scott Engel, except where indicated.

No.	Title	Writer(s)	Origin	Length
1.	"The Plague"		B-side to the "Jackie", 1967	3:34
2.	"Montague Terrace (In Blue)"		Scott, 1967	3:30
3.	"Such a Small Love"		Scott	4:54
4.	"The Amorous Humphrey Plugg"		Scott 2, 1968	4:31
5.	"The Girls from the Streets"		Scott 2	4:10
6.	"Plastic Palace People"		Scott 2	6:06
7.	"The Bridge"		Scott 2	2:51
8.	"It's Raining Today"		Scott 3, 1969	4:00
9.	"Copenhagen"		Scott 3	2:22
10.	"Big Louise"		Scott 3	3:10
11.	"We Came Through"		Scott 3	1:58
12.	"The Seventh Seal"		Scott 4, 1969	4:56
13.	"On Your Own Again"		Scott 4	1:47
14.	"Boy Child"		Scott 4	3:36
15.	"The Old Man's Back Again (Dedicated to the Neo-Stalinist Regime)"		Scott 4	3:43
16.	"Prologue"	Engel, Ady Semel	'Til the Band Comes In, 1970	1:22
17.	"Little Things (That Keep Us Together)"	Engel, Semel	'Til the Band Comes In	2:18
18.	"Time Operator"	Engel, Semel	'Til the Band Comes In	3:37
19.	"Epilogue - The War Is Over (Sleepers)"	Engel, Semel	'Til the Band Comes In	3:34
20.	"The Rope and the Colt"	Andre Hassein, Hal Shapper	Non-album single, 1968	2:00

=== Boy Child: The Best of 1967 – 1970 (1990) LP ===
All tracks are written by Noel Scott Engel, except where indicated.

Side one
No.	Title	Length
1.	"The Plague"	3:34
2.	"Montague Terrace (In Blue)"	3:30
3.	"Such a Small Love"	4:54
4.	"The Amorous Humphrey Plugg"	4:31
5.	"Plastic Palace People"	6:06
6.	"The Bridge"	2:51

Side two
No.	Title	Writer(s)	Length
7.	"Big Louise"		3:10
8.	"We Came Through"		1:58
9.	"The Seventh Seal"		4:56
10.	"Boy Child"		3:36
11.	"The Old Man's Back Again (Dedicated to the Neo-Stalinist Regime)"		3:43
12.	"Prologue"	Engel, Semel	1:22
13.	"Little Things (That Keep Us Together)"	Engel, Semel	2:18
14.	"Time Operator"	Engel, Semel	3:37

=== Boy Child: 67–70 (2000) HDCD ===
All tracks are written by Noel Scott Engel, except where indicated.

No.	Title	Writer(s)	Origin	Length
1.	"Montague Terrace (In Blue)"			3:30
2.	"Such a Small Love"			4:54
3.	"The Plague"			3:34
4.	"The Amorous Humphrey Plugg"			4:31
5.	"The Girls from the Streets"			4:10
6.	"Plastic Palace People"			6:06
7.	"The Bridge"			2:51
8.	"It's Raining Today"			4:00
9.	"Copenhagen"			2:22
10.	"Big Louise"			3:10
11.	"We Came Through"			1:58
12.	"The Seventh Seal"			4:56
13.	"On Your Own Again"			1:47
14.	"Boy Child"			3:36
15.	"The Old Man's Back Again (Dedicated to the Neo-Stalinist Regime)"			3:43
16.	"Angels of Ashes"		Scott 4	4:21
17.	"Prologue"	Engel, Semel		1:22
18.	"Little Things (That Keep Us Together)"	Engel, Semel		2:18
19.	"Time Operator"	Engel, Semel		3:37
20.	"Epilogue - The War Is Over (Sleepers)"	Engel, Semel		3:34

== Personnel ==
- John Franz – Producer
- Wally Stott – Director of Accompaniment (All tracks except those indicated below)
- Wally Stott – Arrangements, Conductor ("Montague Terrace (In Blue)" and "Such A Small Love")
- Peter Knight – Director of Accompaniment ("The Plague", "The Seventh Seal", "The Old Man's Back Again" and "Angels of Ashes")
- Peter Knight – Arrangements, Conductor ("The Girls From the Streets")
- Reg Guest – Arrangements, Conductor ("The Amorous Humphrey Plugg")
- Andre Hassein – Director of Accompaniment ("The Rope and The Colt")
- Marc Almond – Liner notes (1990 edition)
- Neil Hannon – Liner notes (2000 edition)
- Jarvis Cocker – Liner notes (2022 edition)
