= Climate of Hunter =

1984 album by American singer Scott Walker

Studio album by Scott Walker
- Released: March 1984
- Recorded: October–December 1983
- Studios: The Town House, EMI & Sarm West Studios, London
- Genres: Art rock; orchestral pop
- Length: 31:00
- Label: Virgin
- Producers: Peter Walsh, Scott Walker

Scott Walker chronology
Nite Flights (1978)	Climate of Hunter (1984)	Tilt (1995)

Singles from Climate of Hunter
- 1. "Track Three" b/w "Blanket Roll Blues" Released: March 1984

Climate of Hunter is the eleventh solo studio album by the American singer-songwriter Scott Walker. It was released in March 1984 and reached number 60 on the UK Albums Chart. It was his only album of the 1980s.

The album was a comeback of sorts for Walker, following a decade and a half of commercial decline and artistic frustration, and coming off the heels of a renewed interest in his 1960s work from the UK post-punk and indie scene. Walker wrote the songs for the album between August and September 1983, and it was recorded between October and December 1983 in the UK at The Town House, EMI and Sarm West Studios. The album was released as an LP in March 1984, receiving positive reviews. It was released on CD in the late 1980s, and reissued on CD in January 2006, with revised artwork and having been remastered. The original artwork for the album was designed by C.More.Tone, with photography by Bob Carlos Clarke.

== Background ==
Following the commercial failures of 1969's Scott 4 and 1970's 'Til the Band Comes In, Scott Walker spent the next few years releasing MOR albums consisting entirely of cover versions. After the last album of this period, 1974's We Had It All, Walker reformed The Walker Brothers and signed to GTO Records. The first two albums from the reunited group, 1975's No Regrets and 1976's Lines, followed the style of Walker's recent solo work, with neither album including any original songs by him. The title track of the first album, "No Regrets", became a hit single, but critically and commercially both albums were unsuccessful.

The group began recording the third and final album of their reunion period, 1978's Nite Flights, knowing that GTO was soon to collapse. The decision was made to produce an album of their own compositions without compromise. In contrast to the MOR/soft rock style of the previous two albums, Nite Flights featured elements of art rock, hard rock and new wave, utilising harder drums, synthesizers and electric guitars. The three group members each wrote and sang their own compositions. Scott's four songs – "Shut Out", "Fat Mama Kick", "Nite Flights" and "The Electrician" – were his first original compositions since 'Til the Band Comes In. The dark tone and avant-garde approach of Scott's songs, particularly "The Electrician", was to prove a forerunner to the direction of his future solo work.

Nite Flights was released in 1978 to poor sales figures but warm critical opinion, especially Scott's contributions. In 1979, Walker signed a long-term deal with Virgin Records (ultimately, Climate of Hunter would be the only album Walker recorded for Virgin). He remarked in a 1984 radio interview with the journalist Alan Bangs that he had lived on "not a lot" between Nite Flights and Climate of Hunter. In 1981, ardent fan Julian Cope assembled a collection of tracks from Walker's 1967 to 1970 albums titled Fire Escape in the Sky: The Godlike Genius of Scott Walker, focusing solely on original Walker compositions. Issued by independent label Zoo Records, Fire Escape in the Sky inspired a critical re-evaluation of Walker and increased interest in his next album. Walker's old label Philips Records responded by issuing further compilation albums Scott Walker Sings Jacques Brel, The Best of Scott Walker and The Walker Brothers Hits.

Walker was slow to begin writing his first album for Virgin, waiting for songs to come to him naturally rather than force them. The seven original songs on the album were all written during August and September of 1983.

== Recording and music ==
Although it took Walker a long time to write the songs, the recording of the album was relatively quick, taking two months from October to December 1983. The album was produced with Peter Walsh who had recently worked with Simple Minds on their break-through album, 1982's New Gold Dream (81–82–83–84). Together with Walsh, Walker assembled a band of seasoned session players such as free-improvising saxophone player Evan Parker, Dire Straits' Mark Knopfler on guitar and the R&B singer Billy Ocean.

Discussing the recording of the album for the documentary Scott Walker: 30 Century Man (2006), Walsh explained that the musicians were expected to record their parts without knowing the melody to any of the songs, in part because Walker had not recorded any demos and also because the melody was "a closely guarded secret". Walker explained that if the others involved knew the melody, it would take the song away from the "concentrated place" he intended. The intention was to "keep everything a little disjointed" so there is "no chance of everyone swinging together".

The resulting songs are driven by and founded on Peter Van Hooke's drums, Mo Foster's bass and Walker's vocals. Guitars, synthesizers, brass and strings are each used sparingly with abstract results. An orchestra is prominent on "Rawhide" and is the lone accompaniment on "Sleepwalkers Woman", while guitars come to the fore on "Track Three", "Track Seven" and "Blanket Roll Blues".

Walker made the unusual choice of giving no titles to half of the tracks on Climate of Hunter, calling them simply "Track Three", "Track Five", "Track Six", and "Track Seven". He explained in a TV interview on music programme The Tube that the songs were complete and that titles might "lopside" or "overload" them, presumably giving undue weight to one line of the lyric over the others. The songs have since been attributed the informal titles "Delayed" ("Track Three"), "It's a Starving" ("Track Five"), "Say It" (or "Say I" as the 't' is not in bold text) ("Track Six"), and "Stump of a Drowner" ("Track Seven"), because the lyrics sheet bolds each of those starting lines instead of denoting the songs by their "Track" titles.

The last track on the album, "Blanket Roll Blues", is the only song written by Tennessee Williams, providing lyrics for the song originally featured in the 1959 film The Fugitive Kind sung by Marlon Brando.

== Releases ==
Climate of Hunter was first released in March 1984 as an LP in the UK by Virgin Records. The album was re-released on LP and CD as part of Virgin Records' Compact Price range in the late 1980s. A remastered edition of the album was released in the UK by Virgin and EMI on January 30, 2006. It included revised artwork and new liner notes by Bob Stanley of Saint Etienne.

== Reception ==
Professional ratings
Review scores
Source	Rating
AllMusic	3.5/5 stars
The Guardian	3/5 stars

Climate of Hunter received mixed to positive reviews by the majority of critics. It was ranked number 5 among the "Albums of the Year" for 1984 by NME. Its reputation has risen steadily in the decades since. The Guardian wrote in 2006, "Climate of Hunter remains an enigmatic and frequently magical record; something both to puzzle and marvel at." A 2002 review in Unsung agreed: "I believe the time is right for a reassessment of an album that, unlike so many released in the 1980's, has dated very little and, weird as it is, actually seems to make sounder sense now than it ever did." The A.V. Club said in 2012, "On first listen, the album sounds like it fits with the more danceable side of post-punk and new wave, alongside the likes of Ultravox and OMD. But... the record as a whole has a spaciness and distance about it, as though Walker wrote these songs in 1978, tore them up, then tried to recollect them six years later."

== Track listing ==
All tracks composed by Scott Walker, August–September 1983, except "Blanket Roll Blues" (words by Tennessee Williams, music by Kenyon Hopkins). Orchestral arrangements by Brian Gascoigne.

Side one
No.	Title	Length
1.	"Rawhide"	3:55
2.	"Dealer"	5:12
3.	"Track Three" (Informal title: "Delayed")	3:50
4.	"Sleepwalkers Woman"	4:11

Side two
No.	Title	Length
5.	"Track Five" (Informal title: "It's a Starving")	3:35
6.	"Track Six" (Informal title: "Say It" or "Say I")	3:12
7.	"Track Seven" (Informal title: "Stump of a Drowner")	3:46
8.	"Blanket Roll Blues"	3:16

== Personnel ==
- Mo Foster – bass (except tracks 4 & 8)
- Brian Gascoigne – keyboards (on tracks 2, 3 & 5)
- Peter Van Hooke – drums (except tracks 4 & 8)
- Mark Isham – trumpet (on tracks 2 & 3)
- Gary Kettel – percussion (on tracks 5 & 7)
- Billy Ocean – harmony vocal (on track 3)
- Phil Palmer – lead & background guitars (on track 3)
- Evan Parker – tenor & soprano saxophone (on tracks 2 & 6)
- Ray Russell – lead & background guitars (on tracks 3 & 7)
- Mark Knopfler – guitars (on track 8)

Technical

- Bob Carlos Clarke – photography
- c•more•tone – sleeve design

== Release history ==
Region	Date	Label	Format	Catalogue
United Kingdom	March 1984	Virgin	LP	V 2303
United Kingdom	Late 1980s (exact date unknown)	Virgin	CD (part of Virgin's Compact Price series)	CDV 2303
United Kingdom	January 30, 2006	Virgin	CD	CDVR 2303

== Charts ==
Chart	Position
UK Albums Chart	60
