= The Childhood of a Leader (soundtrack) =

Soundtrack album by Scott Walker
- Released: 19 August 2016
- Recorded: 2013–2016
- Genre: Classical
- Length: 30:16
- Label: 4AD
- Producer: Scott Walker; Peter Walsh

Scott Walker chronology
Soused (2014)	The Childhood of a Leader (2016)	Vox Lux (2018)

The Childhood of a Leader is the soundtrack to the 2015 film of the same name, featuring musical score composed by Scott Walker. It is his second score composed for a feature film after his debut composition for Pola X in 1999. The score album was released alongside the film on 19 August 2016, coinciding with the United Kingdom release, and was received with positive reviews.

== Background and release ==
Walker was the earliest crew member to be brought on-board for the film. He agreed to be involved in the film after Corbet texted him during the film's development in mid-2013, albeit his involvement was confirmed in October 2014. Describing the score, Corbet said that "There's nobody that would have been the right combination of classical and totally punk other than Scott. That was a defining characteristic of what we set out to do." Walker wrote the film's music based on the script and had recorded a 120-piece orchestra for the film's score.

At the 2016 International Film Festival Rotterdam, where the film served as the closing film in the festival. Walker performed the film score live during the film's screening. The soundtrack album was released by 4AD on 19 August 2016.

== Critical reception ==
Winston Cook-Wilson of Pitchfork assigned a score of 7.9 (out of 10) and wrote "The Childhood of a Leader is a clear high water mark for Walker in terms of instrumental writing, but it is also, in many ways, an apt extension of textural ideas Walker has explored on his past two albums". Writing for The Quietus, Euan Andrews described it as "an unexpectedly urgent addition to a master's late period canon". In a three-star review Andy Gill of The Independent described it as "a premonitory sweep evoking both destiny and danger".

Louis Pattison of Uncut gave four stars and wrote "You could hardly call Scott's score especially nuanced. But as a recreation of the sheer visceral horror of totalitarianism, a hideous spectacle of tyrannical power unchecked, it is difficult to fault." Nick James Scavo of Tiny Mix Tapes also assigned four stars, saying "It's the power and presence of Walker's flawed, pseudo-totalist music that picks at this sore historical moment, speculating its resiliency, foretelling both childhood and fascism to be ghostly political precodes, a fierce explication of their overlap." Alun Hamnett of Record Collector wrote "Despite its mere 30 minute length, The Childhood Of A Leader is a score that really takes it out of you."

David Meller of MusicOMH wrote "Yet another reason why Walker's soundtrack is so affecting is because it echoes the times we currently live in. It's dogmatic, uncompromising and confrontational." Ed Nash of The Line of Best Fit gave 8/10 and wrote "Scott Walker is more interested in moving forward than looking back and with the soundtrack to The Childhood of a Leader his music is as unique as ever." Audrey Lockie of SLUG Magazine wrote "Scott Walker's music foreshadows tragedy, but never tells when (or if) this tragedy will occur. Often, it feels as if this music simply conjures up a maddening and endless sense of paranoia." Adam Turner-Heffer of Drowned in Sound gave 7/10 and described it as "an impressive work but sans context, it largely will pass a casual listener by as merely a moody and atmospheric soundtrack without much for them to sink their teeth into."

Walker's score received acclaim, as Gary Goldstein of Los Angeles Times said that it "impresses and fascinates". Donald Clarke of The Irish Times called it "MVP" of the film, while Peter Bradshaw of The Guardian described it as an "almost Herrmann-esque orchestral score from Scott Walker. The touch of suppressed psychopathic rage comes from his music." Godfrey Cheshire of RogerEbert.com called Walker's "propulsive, clangorous score" as an "asset throughout the film". Guy Lodge of Variety described it as "cacophonous". Calling it as a "thundering" score, critic based at The Hollywood Reporter wrote "Scott Walker's music is always original, even if it tends to be used in an orgy of symphonic excess." Ignatiy Vishnevetsky of The A.V. Club called Walker's score as "a work of dark, twisted genius, skin-crawling and bombastic in equal measure". David Ehlrich of IndieWire listed the film's score as one among the best scores of the year and the decade.

== Track listing ==
The Childhood of a Leader track listing
No.	Title	Length
1.	"Orchestral Tuning Up"	0:17
2.	"Opening"	5:32
3.	"Dream Sequence"	2:20
4.	"Village Walk"	1:30
5.	"Run"	0:49
6.	"Down the Stairs"	0:32
7.	"Up the Stairs"	1:07
8.	"The Letter"	0:38
9.	"Versailles"	1:24
10.	"Cutting Flowers"	0:41
11.	"Boy, Mirror, Car Arriving"	1:37
12.	"Third Tantrum"	1:57
13.	"Printing Press"	1:06
14.	"On the Way to the Meeting"	1:05
15.	"The Meeting"	3:36
16.	"Post Meeting"	1:47
17.	"Finale"	3:04
18.	"New Dawn (Synth Layout for Cut Scene)"	1:15
Total length:		27:37

== Chart performance ==
Chart performance for The Childhood of a Leader
Chart (2012)	Peak position
Scottish Albums (OCC)	81
UK Albums (OCC)	91
UK Independent Albums (OCC)	19
UK Soundtrack Albums (OCC)	3
