= Lights of Cincinnati =

Single by Scott Walker

from the album Scott 3 (US version)
- B-side: "Two Weeks Since You've Gone"
- Released: June 6, 1969
- Recorded: 1969
- Genre: Folk-pop
- Length: 3:20
- Label: Philips Records
- Songwriters: Tony Macaulay, Geoff Stephens
- Producers: John Franz, Peter Knight

Scott Walker singles chronology
"Joanna" (1968)	"Lights of Cincinnati" (1969)	"I Still See You" (1971)

"Lights of Cincinnati" is a song written by the English songwriters Tony Macaulay and Geoff Stephens which was first a song for the American singer-songwriter Scott Walker in 1969. The song was Walker's third solo single in the UK. The accompaniment was directed by Peter Knight.

"Lights of Cincinnati" was a moderate hit spending ten weeks on the UK Singles Chart and peaking at No. 13 in July 1969. The single also made the Irish Singles Chart peaking at No. 20.

While not included on the concurrently released Scott: Scott Walker Sings Songs from his TV Series album or Scott 3 album from March, the song replaced "30 Century Man" on US editions of Scott 3. The single was backed with the 1969 Scott 3 album track "Two Weeks Since You've Gone". The accompaniment of the b-side was directed by Wally Stott, later known as Angela Morley.

== Track listing ==
Philips – BF 1793
No.	Title	Writer(s)	Length
1.	"Lights of Cincinnati"	T. Macaulay, G. Stephens	3:20
2.	"Two Weeks Since You've Gone"	S. Engel	2:48

== Chart positions ==
Chart (1969)	Peak position
Irish Singles Chart	20
UK Singles Chart	13
