= When Joanna Loved Me =

1964 song by Jack Segal and Robert Wells

Song
- Published: 1964
- Songwriter: Jack Segal
- Composer: Robert Wells

"When Joanna Loved Me" is a 1964 song. The words were written by Jack Segal and the music by Robert Wells. The song was popularised by Tony Bennett, although other versions have been performed by artists such as Frank Sinatra, Paul Desmond, Perry Como and, on his first solo album, Scott Walker.
