= Plague Songs =

Compilation album by various artists
- Released: 2 October 2006
- Recorded: 2006
- Label: 4AD

Professional ratings
Review scores
Source	Rating
AllMusic	3.5/5 stars
The Independent	5/5 stars
Rolling Stone	link
The Sunday Times	2/5 stars

Plague Songs is an album of songs about the ten Plagues of Egypt described in the Book of Exodus performed by various artists.

The songs were originally commissioned by the British arts organisation Artangel for its project The Margate Exodus, which centres on a one-day event that took place in Margate on 30 September 2006.

The 4AD release gathers together the ten original recordings, presented in Biblical plague order.

== Track listing ==
1. "Blood" - Klashnekoff (The Plague of Blood)
2. "Relate the Tale" - King Creosote (The Plague of Frogs)
3. "The Meaning of Lice" - Stephin Merritt (The Plague of Lice)
4. "Flies" - Brian Eno & Robert Wyatt (The Plague of Flies)
5. "The Fifth Plague" - Laurie Anderson (The Death of Livestock)
6. "Boils" - Cody ChesnuTT (The Plague of Boils)
7. "Hailstones" - The Tiger Lillies (The Plague of Hail)
8. "Glittering Cloud" - Imogen Heap (The Plague of Locusts)
9. "Darkness" - Scott Walker (The Plague of Darkness)
10. "Katonah" - Rufus Wainwright (The Death of the Firstborn)
