= Joanna (Scott Walker song) =

Single by Scott Walker
- B-side: "Always Coming Back to You"
- Released: April 1968
- Recorded: 1968
- Genre: Pop
- Length: 3:49
- Label: Philips Records
- Songwriters: Tony Hatch, Jackie Trent
- Producers: John Franz, Peter Knight

Scott Walker singles chronology
"Jackie" (1967)	"Joanna" (1968)	"Lights of Cincinnati" (1969)

"Joanna" is a song written by the English husband and wife song-writing team Tony Hatch and Jackie Trent which was first a song for the American singer-songwriter Scott Walker in 1968. The song was Walker's second solo single in the United Kingdom. The accompaniment was directed by Peter Knight.

The song was originally written for the 1968 movie Joanna, at the request of director Michael Sarne. As Tony Hatch recalled later, "Everybody loved it. Then 20th Century Fox insisted that, as they were financing the film, they must choose the composer, and it had to be Rod McKuen, to whom they had paid a lot of money under an earlier deal. I was furious and had the job of calling Scott’s management and Philips Records to give them the rotten news. Much to my relief, everyone was marvellous about it. They said, ‘Sod the film company. We love Scott’s record. We’ll release it anyway around the time the film goes out.’”

While credited to Hatch and Trent, journalist Joe Jackson writes in his article "The Fugitive Kind" that Walker wrote a significant proportion of the lyric. Jackson quotes Walker as follows: "That whole verse about 'lived in your eyes completely' is mine and I wrote the last line in the song, 'you may remember me and change your mind.'" Hatch confirmed this: "Scott asked if he could change some of the lyrics. His changes were excellent but he declined to accept a co-writer credit, even though we suggested it."

"Joanna" was a major hit and is one of Walker's most popular recordings spending eleven weeks on the UK Singles Chart and peaking at number 7 in June 1968. An instrumental arrangement on the song was used as the theme for Walker's BBC television series, Scott, in 1969.

The single was backed with the 1967 Scott album track "Always Coming Back to You". The accompaniment of the b-side was directed by Reg Guest. Japanese editions are backed with "The Plague", which was previously released as the b-side to "Jackie" in 1967.

== Track listing ==
Philips – BF 1662
No.	Title	Writer(s)	Length
1.	"Joanna"	Tony Hatch, Jackie Trent	3:49
2.	"Always Coming Back To You"	S. Engel	2:40

== Chart positions ==
Chart (1968)	Peak position
New Zealand (Listener)	18
UK Singles (OCC)	7
