= Peter Walsh (music producer) =

British record producer and engineer (born 1960)

- Born: 1960 (age 65–66)
- Occupations: Record producer; engineer
- Years active: 1979–present

Peter Walsh (born 1960) is a British record producer and engineer.

Walsh began his career as an engineer at London's Utopia Studios in the late 1970s, working with Stevie Wonder, the Tubes, Spandau Ballet and the Boomtown Rats amongst others.

His breakthrough was as assistant producer on the 1981 debut studio album by Heaven 17, Penthouse and Pavement (1981). Following this success he went on to produce several artists among them Peter Gabriel, China Crisis, Gene Loves Jezebel and Simple Minds.

In 1984, Walsh produced Scott Walker's eleventh solo studio album, Climate of Hunter. Walsh has continued to work with Walker, producing and performing on his studio albums Tilt (1995), The Drift (2006), Bish Bosch (2012), and Soused (2014), a collaboration between Walker and drone metal band Sunn O))). In addition he has worked with Walker on records by Ute Lemper and Pulp.

== Selected discography ==
- Penthouse and Pavement – Heaven 17 (1981) (Production assistant, engineer)
- Difficult Shapes & Passive Rhythms, Some People Think It's Fun to Entertain – China Crisis (1982) (Producer, engineer)
- New Gold Dream (81–82–83–84) – Simple Minds (1982) (Producer, engineer)
- Plays Live – Peter Gabriel (1983) (Producer, engineer, mixing)
- Climate of Hunter – Scott Walker (1984) (Producer, engineer)
- Shades of Liberty – Silent Running (1984) (Producer, engineer)
- Behaviour – Saga (1985) (Producer, engineer)
- Certain Things Are Likely – Kissing the Pink (1986) (Producer)
- Heyday – The Church (1986) (Producer, engineer, mixing)
- Afternoons in Utopia – Alphaville (1986) (Producer, engineer, mixing)
- The House of Dolls – Gene Loves Jezebel (1987) (Producer, engineer, mixing)
- Twist of Shadows – Xymox (formerly/subsequently Clan of Xymox) 1989 (Producer)
- Phoenix - Xymox (formerly/subsequently Clan of Xymox) 1991 (Producer)
- Love – Heidi Berry (1991) (Programming, engineer, mixing)
- Secret World Tour – Peter Gabriel (1993–1994) front of house concert sound mixer
  - Secret World Live (double album) – Peter Gabriel (1994) studio mix
  - Secret World Live (film) – Peter Gabriel (1994) mix for picture
- Tilt – Scott Walker (1995) (Producer, engineer, mixing)
- Punishing Kiss – Ute Lemper (2000) (Producer, mixing)
- We Love Life – Pulp (2001) (Producer, engineer, mixing)
- The Drift – Scott Walker (2006) (Producer, engineer, mixing)
- Bish Bosch – Scott Walker (2012) (Producer, engineer, mixing)
- Moraima – Andrés Suárez (2013) (Producer, engineer, mixing)
- Soused – Scott Walker and Sunn O))) (2014) (Producer)
- The International Swingers – The International Swingers (2015) (Mixer)
- Always Never Beautiful Forever – The Trudy (2016) (Mix & Additional Production)
