= Amsterdam (Jacques Brel song) =

Single by Jacques Brel

from the album Enregistrement Public à l'Olympia 1964
- Language: French
- English title: The Port of Amsterdam
- Released: 1964
- Recorded: October 1964
- Venue: Olympia Hall
- Genre: Chanson
- Label: Barclay
- Composer: Traditional
- Lyricist: Jacques Brel

"Amsterdam" is a song by Jacques Brel. It combines a powerful melancholic crescendo with a rich poetic account of the exploits of sailors on shore leave in Amsterdam. Musically, it takes its base melody line from the melody of the English folk song Greensleeves.

Brel never recorded this for a studio album, and his only version was released on the live album Olympia 1964, he also did not like the song at all and that performance remains his only one of the tune. Despite this, it has been one of his most enduringly popular works. It was one of the songs Mort Shuman translated into English for the musical Jacques Brel is Alive and Well and Living in Paris.

Brel worked on the song at his house overlooking the Mediterranean at Roquebrune-Cap-Martin, the house he shared with Sylvie Rivet, a publicist for Philips; a place she had introduced him to in 1960. "It was the ideal place for him to create, and to indulge his passion for boats and planes. One morning at six o'clock he read the words of Amsterdam to Fernand, a restaurateur who was about to set off fishing for scorpion fish and conger eels for the bouillabaisse. Overcome, Fernand broke out in sobs and cut open some sea urchins to help control his emotion."

Originally the song was situated in Zeebrugge, but moved to Amsterdam as "it sounded better to the ear".

== Cover versions ==
=== David Bowie version ===
Scott Walker recorded several of these translated Brel songs in the late 1960s. This inspired David Bowie to record his own versions of "Amsterdam" in the early 1970s. Bowie's studio version was released as the B-side to his single "Sorrow", released in September 1973. (This recording may have been made in the summer of 1973 or in late 1971.) Brel refused to meet Bowie when he visited Paris, saying he did not wish to meet a "pédé" ("faggot"), but the latter nevertheless still admired him.

Bowie's version is also found on several other releases:

- The original mix, as heard on the 1973 single B-side, was included on the RCA Records compilation album Rare, in December 1982, and on Re:Call 1, part of the Five Years (1969–1973) compilation, in September 2015.
- Bowie's recording was released as picture discs in both the RCA Life Time picture disc set and the Fashion Picture Disc Set.
- A remix was included as a bonus track on the 1990 Rykodisc CD release of Bowie's 1973 album Pin Ups under the title "Port of Amsterdam", and on the bonus disc of the 2002 Ziggy Stardust - 30th Anniversary Reissue.
- The July 1982 German rerelease of the single "Alabama Song" had "Amsterdam" as the B-side.
- On the 1989 Living Legend Records Publishing CD Chameleon Chronicles Vol.3 (LLRCD 050) "Amsterdam" was recorded for D.L.T. (Dave Lee Travis Show) as "David Bowie and Junior's Eyes" 20 October 1969; broadcast date 26 October 1969.
- "David Bowie and the Tony Visconti Trio (aka The Hype)" recorded "Amsterdam" for the BBC radio show The Sunday Show introduced by John Peel on 5 February 1970 (broadcast date 8 February 1970). This performance may be heard on the 2000 Virgin Records CD Bowie at the Beeb.

=== Other English covers ===
Scott Walker recorded a version on his 1967, debut solo album, Scott.

Dave Van Ronk recorded a version on his 1971 album, Van Ronk.

Fred Holstein recorded a version for his 1977 album "Chicago and Other Ports."

The Dresden Dolls often play a cover of the song live with English lyrics. More recently, Amanda Palmer has performed the original French version in her live solo show with Jason Webley playing accordion.

The Bolshoi recorded a version for their debut single Sob Story in 1984.

Goodbye Mr Mackenzie recorded a version for their debut album Good Deeds and Dirty Rags.

Irish cabaret singer Camille O'Sullivan performs a cover of the song as part of her show with the Spiegeltent. Irish singer-songwriter Jack L has also recorded a version of the song.

John Denver released a version of this song on his album, Take Me To Tomorrow (1970). He released a live version on Live In London (1976). The song was also included as a bonus track on the 2001 reissued CD set of the 1975 live album, An Evening With John Denver. The bonus track performance was taken from John's concert on August 14, 1973, at the Red Rocks Park Amphitheatre in Morrison, Colorado.

Bellowhead have recorded Amsterdam on their 2010 album Hedonism.

Rod McKuen made his own translation of "Amsterdam" and included it on his album Rod McKuen Sings Jacques Brel.

In 2007 Marc Almond recorded a version for the EP "Brel Extras" released 2008

=== Dutch covers ===
Both Dutch band De Dijk and Dutch artists Acda en De Munnik recorded Dutch language versions of the song, called "Amsterdam" and "De stad Amsterdam" (The city Amsterdam) respectively. Other Dutch versions can be found by Liesbeth List (Liesbeth List zingt Jacques Brel), Jan Mesdag (Jan Mesdag zingt Brel) and Jeroen Willems (Jeroen Willems zingt Jacques Brel).

=== Other languages ===
- Finnish: Finnish singer-songwriter Hector recorded a cover of the song in Finnish for his album Yhtenä iltana (1990). Finnish actress and singer Susanna Haavisto sang this song in Finnish translation in a theatrical stage variety based on Brel's songs. A version is included on a compilation album Laulusi elää, Brel! (1984) of songs from this revue.
- German: The song was translated into German and regularly sung by Hildegard Knef at the end of her live performance career, usually to conclude her concerts. A different German translation was also recorded by Klaus Hoffmann in 1975. German chanteuse Ute Lemper included a version of "Amsterdam", in English and French, on her 2002 album But One Day....
- Greek: Translated and performed by Giorgos Arapakis. Also performed by Manos Xidous, and by Vassilis Papakonstantinou.
- Hebrew: Translated by Dan Almagor and originally performed by Dani Litani in 1970. Later on also performed by Corinne Allal and by Sassi Keshet.
- Polish: The Polish version of "Amsterdam", with lyrics translated by Wojciech Młynarski, was performed by, among others, Piotr Zadrożny, Katarzyna Groniec and Marcin Czarnik.
- Slovenian: Slovenian actor Branko Završan translated and recorded "Amsterdam" in his album Senca tvojga psa (Shadow of your dog), realised in 2008.
- Basque: Basque poet and singer Xabier Lete translated "Amsterdam" and sang it in his last concert in Errenteria, on 25/09/1999. The concert, given for the basque festival Kilometroak, was recorded and finally released in 2011.
- Turkish: Adapted from the original French lyrics together with the English lyrics of David Bowie version by Şamil Şirin in 2018 and performed by the band Hanımlar&Beyler in the IzTech SpringFest'18.
- Spanish: Asturian singer-songwriter Pablo Und Destruktion recorded a Spanish cover called "Gijón" for his 2020 album "Futuros Valores".
- Italian: Translated and recorded in 1996 by Duilio Del Prete and released on his posthumous album Duilio Del Prete canta Brel (2002). Translated and recorded by Pippo Pollina for his album Versi per la libertà (2001). Also translated by Sergio Secondiano Sacchi and performed by Peppe Voltarelli for his album Planetario (2021).
