= Jacky (Jacques Brel song) =

1966 single by Jacques Brel

"La Chanson de Jacky"

Song by Jacques Brel

from the album Ces gens-là
- Released: 1966
- Recorded: 2 November 1965
- Genre: Chanson
- Label: Barclay
- Songwriters: Jacques Brel, Gérard Jouannest

"Jacky" (La chanson de Jacky) is a song written by the Belgian singer-songwriter Jacques Brel and Gérard Jouannest. Brel recorded the song on 2 November 1965, and it was released on his 1966 album Ces gens-là. The song was translated from French into English and retitled "Jackie".

The song has been covered a number of times, particularly in Europe. In the United States, the song's popularity grew through its appearance (as "Jackie") in the score of the off-Broadway revue Jacques Brel is Alive and Well and Living in Paris, which opened on 22 January 1968.

== Scott Walker version ==
"Jackie"

Single by Scott Walker

from the album Scott 2
- B-side: "The Plague"
- Released: 1967
- Recorded: 1967
- Genre: Baroque pop
- Length: 3:24
- Label: Philips Records
- Songwriters: Jacques Brel, Gérard Jouannest, Mort Shuman
- Producer: John Franz

Scott Walker singles chronology
"Jackie" (1967)	"Joanna" (1968)

"Jackie" was later recorded and released in 1967 by the American singer-songwriter Scott Walker as his first solo single in the UK. Walker recorded the Mort Shuman translation. The accompaniment was directed by Angela Morley.

The single was controversial in the UK likely because of lyrics like "authentic queers and phony virgins" and drug references. The song was banned by the BBC and was not performed on the corporation's TV or played on the mainstream radio channels. The song was performed on non-BBC channels, most notably on Frankie Howerd's show Howerd's Hour where Walker danced comically during the performance.

"Jackie" was a moderate hit, spending nine weeks on the UK Singles Chart and peaking at No. 22 in January 1968. The following year it was included as the opening track on Walker's most popular album Scott 2.

The single is notable for including one of Walker's few non-album b-sides. The accompaniment for "The Plague" was directed by Peter Knight in an atypical arrangement that featured guitar and female backing singers. English singer Marc Almond covered "The Plague" in 1986 for his covers EP A Woman's Story.

=== Track listing ===
Philips – BF 1628
No.	Title	Writer(s)	Length
1.	"Jackie"	Jacques Brel, Gérard Jouannest, Mort Shuman	3:24
2.	"The Plague"	S. Engel	3:34

=== Charts ===
Chart (1967/8)	Peak position
UK Singles (OCC)	22

== Other recordings ==
In 1977, Jacky (entitled as "Jackie") was recorded by Peter Straker on his album This One's On Me, which was co-produced by his close friend Freddie Mercury. He has since recorded the song a second time for his 2012 album and associated stage show Brel.

In May 1986, Momus released his version of the song, retitled as "Nicky" after the singer's first name, as the title track of a three-song EP of Brel covers.

In 1991, Marc Almond recorded a cover version of Brel's song for his album Tenement Symphony, and released it as a single. It reached No. 17 in the UK, No. 6 on the UK Airplay Chart, No. 14 in Ireland, No. 11 in Luxembourg and No. 6 on Finland's sales-only chart.

In 2012, Secret Chiefs 3 and Mike Patton collaborated under the moniker Traditionalists to release a cover of this on the Mimicry record label. It also marks the first recorded collaboration of original Mr. Bungle founders Mike Patton and Trey Spruance since the band dissolved in 2004.
