= Tilt (Scott Walker album) =

Studio album by Scott Walker
- Released: 8 May 1995
- Studios: RAK Studios, Townhouse Studios
- Genres: Avant-garde; experimental; industrial
- Length: 56:58
- Labels: Fontana (UK); Drag City (US)
- Producers: Scott Walker and Peter Walsh

Scott Walker chronology
Climate of Hunter (1984)	Tilt (1995)	Pola X soundtrack (1999)

Professional ratings
Review scores
Source	Rating
AllMusic	4/5 stars
Chicago Tribune	3/4 stars
The Guardian	4/5 stars
Pitchfork	8.6/10
Rolling Stone	4/5 stars
Spin	8/10
Sputnikmusic	4/5 stars

Tilt is the twelfth solo studio album by the American/English singer-songwriter Scott Walker. It was released on 8 May 1995. It was Walker's first studio album in eleven years.

Walker composed most of the songs in 1991 and 1992, the exceptions being "Manhattan", which was written in 1987, and the final song "Rosary", which was composed in 1993. The album was recorded at RAK Studios and Townhouse Studios in the UK and its release had been expected as early as 1992 but was not completed until 1995. The album is the first of what Walker later called "kind of a trilogy" of albums that went on to include The Drift (2006) and Bish Bosch (2012).

== Details ==
The songs on the album have a decidedly bleak, forlorn and funereal mood; the lyrics are replete with arcane allusions and recondite wordplay and ellipses. Like Walker's previous effort, Climate of Hunter (1984), Tilt combines elements of European avant-garde and experimental music, while also adding industrial music influences. The unusual literary, musical and performance qualities of Walker's songwriting and singing are reminiscent of the lieder and "art song" traditions – forms which long predate the era of recorded popular music and electronic media.

The compositions emphasize abstract atmospherics over harmonic structure, with minimalist, slightly discordant "sound blocks" and trance-like repetition rendered through carefully nuanced instrumentation and sparsely deployed sonic effects. Walker's voice resonates in a cavernous echo, taking on a haunted, distant, desolate quality, which one reviewer characterized as "Samuel Beckett at La Scala".

The opening track, "Farmer in the City", is subtitled "Remembering Pasolini". A few of the lyrics are appropriated from Norman Macafee's English translation of Pier Paolo Pasolini's poem, "Uno dei tanti epiloghi" ("One of the Many Epilogs"), which was written in 1969 for Pasolini's friend and protégé, the scruffy young nonprofessional actor, Ninetto Davoli. Throughout the song, Walker's chant of "Do I hear 21, 21, 21...? I'll give you 21, 21, 21...", may be a reference to Davoli's age when he was drafted into (and subsequently deserted from) the Italian army.

The lyrics of "The Cockfighter" include "excerpts relocated from the trial of Queen Caroline and the trial of Adolf Eichmann". Both this song and "Bouncer See Bouncer..." also lyrically relate to The Holocaust. "Bolivia '95" is a song about South American refugees. The subtitle of "Manhattan", "flȇrdelē'", is a phonetic-matching corruption of the term fleur de lis, which is mentioned in the lyrics of the song.

In addition to a core lineup of musicians playing rock instruments, the recording also features contributions from the strings of Sinfonia of London and the Methodist Central Hall Pipe Organ, which were arranged and conducted by frequent collaborator Brian Gascoigne.

== Track listing ==
All tracks are written by N. S. Engel (Scott Walker).

Side One
No.	Title	Length
1.	"Farmer in the City (Remembering Pasolini)"	6:38
2.	"The Cockfighter"	6:01
3.	"Bouncer See Bouncer..."	8:50
4.	"Manhattan (flȇrdelē')"	6:05
Total length:		27:34

Side Two
No.	Title	Length
5.	"Face on Breast"	5:15
6.	"Bolivia '95"	7:44
7.	"Patriot (A single)"	8:28
8.	"Tilt"	5:13
9.	"Rosary"	2:41
Total length:		29:21

== Personnel ==
=== Players ===
- Scott Walker – vocals, guitar on "Rosary"
- Ian Thomas – drums
- John Giblin – bass guitar
- Brian Gascoigne – keyboards
- David Rhodes – guitars

=== Additional players ===
- "Farmer in the City"
  - Strings of Sinfonia of London, arranged and conducted by Brian Gascoigne
  - Elizabeth Kenny – chitarrone
  - Roy Carter – oboe
- "The Cockfighter"
  - Hugh Burns – guitar
  - Alasdair Malloy – percussion
  - Louis Jardim – percussion
  - Andrew Cronshaw – horns and reeds
  - Brian Gascoigne – celeste and organ of the Methodist Central Hall
- "Bouncer See Bouncer..."
  - Jonathan Snowden – flutes
  - Andy Findon – bass flute
  - Jim Gregory – bass flute
  - Roy Jowitt – clarinet
  - Roy Carter – oboe
  - Brian Gascoigne – woodwind orchestration and organ of the Methodist Central Hall
  - Peter Walsh – prog bass drum
- "Manhattan"
  - Alasdair Malloy – percussion
  - Louis Jardim – percussion
  - Brian Gascoigne – organ of the Methodist Central Hall
  - Andrew Cronshaw – concertina
- "Face on Breast"
  - Ian Thomas – "bass drum on lap and kit all at once"
  - Colin Pulbrook – Hammond organ
  - Scott Walker and Peter Walsh – whistles
- "Bolivia '95"
  - Hugh Burns – guitars
  - Alasdair Malloy – percussion
  - Louis Jardim – percussion
  - Andrew Cronshaw – ba-wu flute
  - Greg Knowles – cimbalom
- "Patriot (a single)"
  - Strings of Sinfonia of London, orchestrated and conducted by Brian Gascoigne
  - Jonathan Snowden – piccolo
  - John Barclay – trumpets
  - Ian Thomas – military bass drum and cymbals
- "Rosary"
  - Scott Walker – guitar

== Promo singles ==
Two promo CDs were released to promote Tilt on the radio and in record stores, containing edited versions of Tilt songs.

Scott 1 (Fontana – EEFR 1)

1. "Patriot (a single)" (edit) – 4:40
2. "The Cockfighter" (edit) – 4:07

Scott 2 (Fontana - EEFR 2)

1. "Tilt" (edit) – 4:38
2. "Farmer in the City" (edit) – 4:37

== Charts ==
Chart performance for Tilt
Chart	Peak position
UK Albums Chart	27

== Release history ==
The album was first released in Europe as a limited edition LP and CD in May 1995 before it was released in the US in 1997. The artwork for the album was designed by Stylorouge with photography and image manipulation of Walker's hand by David Scheinmann from a concept by Walker.

Tilt was met with strong reviews from critics, as well as some bewilderment. As Jazz Monroe summed it up in Pitchfork, "Tilt is good. Scarily, maddeningly good. It is like an old mansion full of haunted arcana: revolving bookcases, secret rooms, a golden pouf to perch on sipping ancient eau de vie. Even the easiest pleasures, like the stained-glass daybreak in 'Bouncer See Bouncer,' arise from such obscure surroundings their beauty is always sudden, a second too quick for your defenses."

Release history for Tilt
Region	Date	Label	Format	Catalogue
United Kingdom	8 May 1995	Fontana	CD	526 859-2
United Kingdom	8 May 1995	Fontana	LP (Limited Edition)	526 859-1
United States	2 September 1997	Drag City	CD	DC134CD
United States	18 November 2008	Drag City	LP	DC134
