= Scott 4 =

Studio album by Scott Engel
- Released: 7 November 1969
- Studio: Olympic (London)
- Genres: Orchestral pop; baroque pop; avant-garde
- Length: 32:28
- Label: Philips
- Producer: John Franz

Scott Engel chronology
Scott: Scott Walker Sings Songs from his TV Series (1969)	Scott 4 (1969)	'Til The Band Comes In (1970)

Scott 4 is the fifth solo studio album (the fourth to include original material) by American musician Scott Walker, released on November 7, 1969. The album was released under his birth name, Scott Engel, and failed to chart. All reissues have been under his stage name. It has since received praise as one of Walker's best works.

== Content ==
Scott 4 was the first Walker album to consist solely of self-penned songs. The preceding Scott (1967), Scott 2 (1968) and Scott 3 (1969) albums had each featured a mixture of originals and covers, including several translations of Jacques Brel songs, which were later collected to form the album Scott Walker Sings Jacques Brel (1981). Scott 4 also features slightly less ornate orchestral arrangements than its predecessors, opting instead for a more skeletal, folk-inspired sound with greater emphasis on the rhythm section.

The opening track, "The Seventh Seal", is based on the 1957 film of the same name by filmmaker Ingmar Bergman. The second track on side two, "The Old Man's Back Again (Dedicated to the Neo-Stalinist Regime)", refers to the 1968 Warsaw Pact invasion of Czechoslovakia.

The Albert Camus quote, "A man's work is nothing but this slow trek to rediscover, through the detours of art, those two or three great and simple images in whose presence his heart first opened", appears on the back of the album sleeve. The quote derives from Camus' essay "Between Yes and No", published in 1958.

Engel said the album tried to "link lyrics by Sartre, Camus and Yevtushenko to Bartok modal lines."

== Release and reception ==
Scott 4 was released by Philips Records on 7 November 1969 in the United Kingdom. The album failed to chart and was deleted soon after.

It has been speculated that Walker's decision to release the album under his birth name of Scott Engel contributed to its chart failure. All subsequent reissues of the album have been under his stage name. After being out of print for over 20 years, the album was finally made available again in 1992, when it was issued on CD alongside Scott, Scott 2 and Scott 3.

=== Critical ===
Professional ratings
Review scores
Source	Rating
AllMusic	4.5/5 stars
Pitchfork	9.0/10
Trouser Press	favorable
Encyclopedia of Popular Music	5/5 stars
New Musical Express	favorable
Select (1992)	5/5 stars
Select (2000)	5/5 stars

In a contemporary review for New Musical Express published November 29, 1969, Graham Coxhill stated, "Scott 4 [...] is released next week, and if there has ever been a better album by a male singer, it certainly hasn't come my way." He concluded, "I don't think Scott has yet found his musical resting place, but to judge by Scott 4, he has outgrown his self-indulgent, two-fingers-to-the-world phase, and at last he's hit on some fine music which a public can enjoy and of which he can justifiably feel proud."

A writer for Observer-Leader commented how Engel singing solely original compositions throughout the "exciting" album "creates quite an impact", believing the singer would win new appreciation but also lose fans who preferred his Walker Brothers image, adding: "If you care to sit, listen and accept his preachings, then count yourselves among the new Scott Engel fans." Reviewing Scott 4, the Sunday Mirror believed the change of stage name was irrelevant because "this is the most sincere vocal sound both sides of the Atlantic". The Lincolnshire Echo believed it was stylistically similar to Engel's previous three albums, with impressive vocals over a full orchestral backing, finally characterising the album as "sophisticated pop".

Mark Lager, in a retrospective review, wrote that it is "arguably the best album of his career, you can hear from the first notes of the opening track that he was ambitiously and boldly pushing both his lyrics and soundscapes into a stronger terrain. 'Seventh Seal' is an Ennio Morriconesque epic. His lyrics in 'Angels of Ashes' are spiritual and share similarities with Rainer Maria Rilke's Duino Elegies. 'Boy Child' contains celestial, ghostly orchestration. 'Old Man's Back Again' is arguably Scott Walker's most powerful song. David Bowie was heavily influenced and inspired by Scott Walker not only in his deep, baritone vocals but also in his own Cold War contemplations in the instrumentals of Low. On 'Get Behind Me', the soaring gospel choir and sublime orchestrations joined with his own soulful and stunning vocals make this a magnificent masterpiece." Reviewing the 1992 reissue, Select critic Andrew Perry rated Scott 4 five stars out of five and called it a "total classic", believing the songs to be "grand-scale in their efforts to pin down sheer, sad emotion to beautiful words and music." Ian Harrison, also of Select, noted how the album contains "barmy, fatalist sublimities" like "The Seventh Seal".

== Legacy ==
Scott 4 subsequently came to be regarded as one of Walker's strongest works and has been acknowledged in the book 1001 Albums You Must Hear Before You Die. It was voted number 760 in the third edition of Colin Larkin's All Time Top 1000 Albums (2000). It has also been praised by the members of Radiohead.

== Track listing ==
All tracks are written by Scott Walker (credited as Noel Scott Engel).

Side one
No.	Title	Length
1.	"The Seventh Seal"	4:58
2.	"On Your Own Again"	1:48
3.	"The World's Strongest Man"	2:21
4.	"Angels of Ashes"	4:22
5.	"Boy Child"	3:38

Side two
No.	Title	Length
1.	"Hero of the War"	2:29
2.	"The Old Man's Back Again (Dedicated to the Neo-Stalinist Regime)"	3:43
3.	"Duchess"	2:51
4.	"Get Behind Me"	3:14
5.	"Rhymes of Goodbye"	3:04
Total length:		32:28

== Personnel ==
- Peter Knight – accompaniment director (1, 4, 6, 7)
- Wally Stott – accompaniment director (2, 5)
- Keith Roberts – accompaniment director (3, 8–10)
- John Franz – producer
- Keith Grant – engineer
- Adrian Kerridge – engineer
- John Constable – design

== Release history ==
Region	Date	Label	Format	Catalogue
United Kingdom	November 1969	Philips	LP (Credited to 'Scott Engel')	SBL 7913
United Kingdom	August 3, 1992	Fontana	CD	510 882-2
United Kingdom	June 5, 2000	Fontana	HDCD	510 882-2
United States	February 15, 2008	4 Men With Beards	LP	4M152
