= Pola X (soundtrack) =

Soundtrack album by Scott Walker
- Released: 17 May 1999
- Recorded: Studios Davout, Paris, Lansdowne Recording Studio, London, Air Studios, London
- Genre: Classical, avant-garde, experimental
- Length: 55:55
- Label: Barclay
- Producer: Scott Walker

Scott Walker chronology
| Tilt (1995) | Pola X (1999) | 5 Easy Pieces (2003) |

Pola X is the soundtrack album to Léos Carax's film of the same name composed, and produced by the American artist Scott Walker. The soundtrack also includes contributions from Smog, Sonic Youth, Fairuz, Nguyên Lê, and M. Luobin Wang. It was released on 17 May 1999. It was Walker's first full soundtrack.

The soundtrack was recorded in Paris at Studios Davout, and in London at Lansdowne Recording Studio and Air Studios. Receiving positive reviews the soundtrack album was released in May 1999 on CD in France and Japan. All of Walker's compositions were later included on the fifth disc of Walker's 2003 boxset compilation 5 Easy Pieces.

Walker followed his scoring work on Pola X with scores for dance performances, namely 2007's And Who Shall Go to the Ball? And What Shall Go to the Ball? for the London-based CandoCo Dance Company and ROH2 production's performances of Jean Cocteau’s Duet for One in 2011. Prior to the soundtrack, Walker already had a long history of performing songs from films and contributing songs to soundtracks, most notably 1969's "The Rope and the Colt" for Une corde, un colt, 1971's "I Still See You" for The Go-Between, 1993's "Man from Reno" for Toxic Affair, and 1999's "Only Myself to Blame" for The World Is Not Enough OST.

== Reception ==
Professional ratings
Review scores
| Source | Rating |
|---|---|
| Allmusic | 4/5 stars |

Pola X received mixed to positive reviews by the majority of critics.

== Track listing ==
All tracks performed and written by Scott Walker except where otherwise noted.

| No. | Title | Writer(s) | Length |
|---|---|---|---|
| 1. | "The Time Is Out Of Joint!" | | 1:08 |
| 2. | "Light" | | 3:20 |
| 3. | "Meadow" | | 2:09 |
| 4. | "The Darkest Forest" | | 5:42 |
| 5. | "Extra Blues" (Performed by Smog) | Bill Callahan | 6:03 |
| 6. | "Never Again" | | 1:26 |
| 7. | "Iza Kana Zanbi" (Performed by Fairuz) | Assy Rahbany, Mansour Rahbany | 8:53 |
| 8. | "Trang Mo Ben Suo" (Performed by Nguyên Lê) | M.Le Mong N'Guyen | 1:15 |
| 9. | "Zai Na Yao Yuan De Di Fang" (Performed by M. Luobin Wang) | M. Luobin Wang | 0:59 |
| 10. | "Church Of The Apostles" | | 5:53 |
| 11. | "Bombupper" | | 1:39 |
| 12. | "River Of Blood" | | 1:22 |
| 13. | "Blink" (Performed by Sonic Youth) | Sonic Youth | 5:21 |
| 14. | "Running" | | 1:56 |
| 15. | "Closing" | | 1:49 |
| 16. | "Isabel" | | 6:51 |
| Total length: | | | 55:55 |

== Personnel ==
- Jean-Claude Dubois - Orchestra Direction
- Geoff Foster - Mixing
- Paris Philharmonic Orchestra
- Brian Gascoigne - Orchestration
- Scott Walker - Producer
