= Vox Lux (soundtrack) =

Soundtrack album by Various artists
- Released: December 14, 2018
- Length: 56:20
- Label: Three Six Zero Recordings; Columbia
- Producer: Scott Walker (exec.); Lefti; Chris Braide; Garibay; Greg Kurstin; Daniel Padilla; Ramiro Padilla; StarGate; Al Shux; Grant Michaels

Vox Lux is a soundtrack to the 2018 film of the same name, released by Three Six Zero Recordings and Columbia Records on December 14, 2018.

The album features a score by Scott Walker and original songs by Sia and producer Greg Kurstin.

== Track listing ==
Track listing adapted from Consequence of Sound. Credits adapted from Spotify.

No.	Title	Writer(s)	Producer(s)	Length
1.	"Wrapped Up" (performed by Natalie Portman)	Sia Furler; Greg Kurstin	Kurstin	4:28
2.	"Blinded by Love" (performed by Natalie Portman)	Furler; Fernando Garibay	Garibay; Daniel Padilla; Ramiro Padilla	3:41
3.	"Firecracker" (performed by Natalie Portman)	Furler; Alexander Palmer	Lefti	3:04
4.	"Sweat and Tears" (performed by Natalie Portman)	Furler; Jake Troth	Lefti	2:42
5.	"Private Girl" (performed by Natalie Portman)	Furler; Mikkel Eriksen; Tor Hermansen	StarGate	3:38
6.	"Ekg" (performed by Natalie Portman)	Furler; Alexander Shuckburgh	Al Shux	2:32
7.	"Wrapped Up" (performed by Raffey Cassidy)	Furler; Kurstin	Christopher Braide	2:15
8.	"Alive" (performed by Raffey Cassidy)	Furler; Jesse St. John Geller; Grant Michaels	Michaels	4:39
9.	"Your Body Talk" (performed by Raffey Cassidy)	Furler; Christopher Braide	Braide	3:47
10.	"Hologram (Smoke and Mirrors)" (performed by Raffey Cassidy)	Furler; Garibay	Garibay	3:38
11.	"Prelude" (performed by Scott Walker)	Scott Walker	Walker	1:10
12.	"Night Walk" (performed by Scott Walker)	Walker	Walker	0:36
13.	"Opening Credits" (performed by Scott Walker)	Walker	Walker	3:30
14.	"Anthem" (performed by Scott Walker)	Furler; Kurstin	Walker	1:22
15.	"Yearning" (performed by Scott Walker)	Walker	Walker	4:29
16.	"Terrorist" (performed by Scott Walker)	Walker	Walker	1:47
17.	"C&A Walk" (performed by Scott Walker)	Walker	Walker	2:19
18.	"Dressing Room" (performed by Scott Walker)	Walker	Walker	2:07
19.	"Druggie" (performed by Scott Walker)	Walker	Walker	2:50
20.	"Finale" (performed by Scott Walker)	Walker	Walker	1:31
Total length:				56:20
