= Scott Walker: 30 Century Man =

- Poster
- Directed by: Stephen Kijak
- Produced by: Mia Bays; Stephen Kijak; Elizabeth Rose
- Starring: Scott Walker
- Music by: Scott Walker
- Distributed by: Oscilloscope (United States); Verve Pictures (United Kingdom)
- Release date: 2006
- Running time: 95 minutes
- Countries: United Kingdom; United States
- Language: English

Scott Walker: 30 Century Man is a 2006 documentary film about American-British singer-songwriter Scott Walker. The film gets its title from the Scott 3 song "30 Century Man". It is directed and co-produced by Stephen Kijak, with Grant Gee serving as director of photography. It charts Walker's career in music, with a focus on his songwriting, and features exclusive footage of recording sessions for his most recent album, The Drift including a memorable sequence in which Walker oversees the recording of the punching of a joint of pork, for the percussion on the song Clara. Rock legend David Bowie, who often professed to having been inspired by Walker, acted as executive producer of the film. Actor Gale Harold is one of the associate producers.

The film received its world premiere at the London Film Festival on 31 October 2006 and debuted internationally at the 2007 Berlin International Film Festival in the Panorama. It was released later in 2007 in cinemas and on DVD in the UK by Verve Pictures and went on to become one of the most critically acclaimed documentaries released there that year. It had its US premiere at the South by Southwest (SXSW) Film Festival in March 2007. Other film festivals that have screened the film include the Sydney Film Festival, Tribeca Film Festival, HotDocs, Melbourne International Film Festival, Viennale, Seattle International Film Festival, and the Hong Kong International Film Festival.

In addition to Walker himself, interviewees in the film include David Bowie, Radiohead, Jarvis Cocker, Brian Eno, Damon Albarn, Marc Almond, Alison Goldfrapp, Sting, Dot Allison, Simon Raymonde, Richard Hawley, Rob Ellis, Cathal Coughlan, Johnny Marr, Gavin Friday, Lulu, Peter Olliff, Angela Morley (arranger of Walker's sixties' recordings as Wally Stott), Ute Lemper, Ed Bicknell, Evan Parker, Hector Zazou, Mo Foster, Phil Sheppard, and Peter Walsh.

The film is produced by Oscar-winning producer Mia Bays, marking her debut in documentary and feature film production. She was nominated for a 2008 BAFTA award (The Carl Foreman Award for Special Achievement by a British Writer, Director or Producer in Their First Feature Film) for her work on the film.

An edited version of the film was used for the BBC series Imagine. It was introduced by Alan Yentob.

In early 2008 Madman Films released the film on DVD in Australia and Avalon films released the film on DVD in Spain. Oscilloscope Laboratories, a distribution company founded by Adam Yauch of Beastie Boys, acquired the distribution rights in North America after the film's US release was delayed. It began another critically acclaimed theatrical run, this time in select US cities, and was released on DVD in North America in Summer 2009.

== Soundtrack ==
Music Inspired by the Film Scott Walker: 30 Century Man

Soundtrack album by Various Artists
- Released: 26 May 2009
- Label: Lakeshore Records
- Producer: Stephen Kijak

Professional ratings
Review scores
Source	Rating
Allmusic	3.5/5 stars

Music Inspired by the Film Scott Walker: 30 Century Man was released on 26 May 2009 to promote the US release of the film. Instead of a compilation of Walker's material the album was conceived as a tribute album. The album was released on Lakeshore Records

No.	Title	Performer(s)	Length
1.	"Duchess"	Peter Broderick	3:08
2.	"Big Louise"	Sally Norvell	4:15
3.	"The World's Strongest Man"	Damon & Naomi	3:13
4.	"Manhattan"	Saint Etienne	4:15
5.	"The Electrician"	Laurie Anderson	4:40
6.	"The Seventh Seal"	Nicole Atkins	5:23
7.	"Montague Terrace (In Blue)"	Dot Allison	3:24
8.	"The Bridge"	Bee and Flower	2:54
9.	"Rhymes of Goodbye"	Stephanie Dosen	4:26
10.	"It's Raining Today"	Ulrich Schnauss	4:37
11.	"A Lover Loves"	Jarboe	3:20
12.	"Such a Small Love"	Paul Wallfisch and Little Annie	4:25

== Reception ==
On review aggregator website Rotten Tomatoes, the film holds an approval rating of 87% based on 31 reviews, with an average rating of 6.8/10.
