= Scott (album) =

Studio album by Scott Walker
- Released: August 25, 1967
- Recorded: 1967
- Genre: Baroque pop
- Length: 40:30
- Label: Philips
- Producer: John Franz

Scott Walker chronology
Images (1967)	Scott (1967)	Scott 2 (1968)

Professional ratings
Review scores
Source	Rating
AllMusic	4.5/5 stars
Pitchfork	8.4/10

Scott is the debut solo album by Scott Walker, originally released in the United Kingdom on Philips Records in 1967. The album received both strong commercial success as well as critical praise, hitting No. 3 on the UK Albums Chart. The album was produced by John Franz, who had previously worked with Walker's group the Walker Brothers, while its instrumental accompaniments were arranged and conducted by Angela Morley, Reg Guest and Peter Knight.

== Overview ==
Scott was released only six months after Walker's third album with The Walker Brothers, Images. Its mixture of Walker's original compositions and selection of cover versions established Walker as a more serious and sombre artist; gone were the Beat group and Blue-eyed soul material of his former group. The choice of material generally fell into four main categories: his own work ("Montague Terrace (In Blue)", "Such a Small Love", "Always Coming Back to You"), contemporary covers ("The Lady Came from Baltimore", "Angelica"), movie songs ("You're Gonna Hear From Me", "Through a Long and Sleepless Night") and significantly, English-translated versions of the songs of the Belgian singer and songwriter Jacques Brel ("Mathilde", "My Death", "Amsterdam"). Brel was a major influence on Walker's own compositions, and Walker included three of his songs on each of his next two solo albums, Scott 2 and Scott 3. Walker described Brel without qualification as "the most significant singer-songwriter in the world". The real coup for Walker was his luck in acquiring and recording the new Mort Shuman-translated versions of Brel's material before anyone else.

Since the album's release, three complete outtakes, likely recorded during the Scott album sessions, have circulated in bootlegged form. These are "Free Again" (Basile/Canfora/Colby/Jourdan), "I Get Along Without You Very Well" (Hoagy Carmichael) and "I Think I'm Getting Over You" (Roger Cook/Roger Greenaway), the latter of which was recorded for potential single release.

== Release and reception ==
The album was released by Philips Records on 25 August 1967 in the UK. It reached No. 3 on the UK Albums Chart, and stayed on the chart for seventeen weeks. It was released the following year in the US on Smash Records under the title Aloner.

== Track listing ==
Side one
No.	Title	Writer(s)	Length
1.	"Mathilde"	Jacques Brel, Gérard Jouannest, Mort Shuman	2:39
2.	"Montague Terrace (In Blue)"	Noel Scott Engel	3:31
3.	"Angelica"	Cynthia Weil, Barry Mann	4:02
4.	"The Lady Came from Baltimore"	Tim Hardin	1:59
5.	"When Joanna Loved Me"	Jack Segal, Robert Wells	3:08
6.	"My Death"	Brel, Shuman	4:57

Side two
No.	Title	Writer(s)	Length
1.	"The Big Hurt"	Wayne Shanklin	2:26
2.	"Such a Small Love"	Engel	4:55
3.	"You're Gonna Hear From Me"	André Previn, Dory Previn	2:53
4.	"Through a Long and Sleepless Night"	Mack Gordon, Alfred Newman	4:12
5.	"Always Coming Back to You"	Engel	2:41
6.	"Amsterdam"	Brel, Shuman	3:04

== Personnel ==
- Scott Walker – vocals
- Wally Stott – arranger, conductor (1, 2, 5, 7, 8)
- Reg Guest – arranger, conductor (3, 4, 6, 11)
- Peter Knight – arranger, conductor (9, 10)
- John Franz – producer
- Peter J. Olliff – engineer
- Keith Altham – liner notes

== Release history ==
Region	Date	Label	Format	Catalogue
France	1967	Philips	LP	844 202 BY
United Kingdom	September 1967	Philips	LP (Stereo)	SBL 7816
United Kingdom	September 1967	Philips	LP (Mono)	BL 7816
United States	1968	Smash	LP (Title: Aloner)	27099
United Kingdom	March 16, 1992	Fontana	CD	510 879-2
United Kingdom	June 5, 2000	Fontana	HDCD	510 879-2
United States	February 15, 2008	4 Men With Beards	LP	4M149

== Charts ==
Weekly chart performance for Small Faces
Chart (1967–68)	Peak position
Finnish Soumen virallinen Albums	14
UK Record Retailer LPs Chart	3
UK Disc and Music Echo Top Ten LPs	3
UK Melody Maker Top Ten LPs	3
UK New Musical Express Top 15 LPs	3
