= 'Til the Band Comes In =

Solo album by American singer Scott Walker

Studio album by Scott Walker
- Released: December 1970
- Recorded: September–November 1970
- Studio: Philips (London)
- Genres: Baroque pop; rock; pop
- Length: 41:12
- Label: Philips
- Producer: John Franz

Scott Walker chronology
Scott 4 (1969)	'Til the Band Comes In (1970)	The Moviegoer (1972)

Singles from 'Til the Band Comes In
- 1. "'Til the Band Comes In" b/w "Jean the Machine" Released: 1971; 2. "Jean the Machine" b/w "Joe" Released: 1971; 3. "Thanks For Chicago Mr. James" b/w "The Hills of Yesterday" Released: 1971

'Til the Band Comes In is the sixth solo studio album by the American singer-songwriter Scott Walker. It was released in December 1970 but failed to chart. Three singles were released from the album: the title track backed with "Jean the Machine" was released in the Netherlands, and "Jean the Machine" and "Thanks For Chicago Mr. James" were each released in Japan. No singles were released in the UK. The release is a loose concept album about the inhabitants of a tenement.

== Background and recording ==
After the commercial failure of his previous album Scott 4, Walker made several compromises with his manager and record company in an effort to restore his career momentum. The most apparent commercial decision was the singer's return to his stage name having chosen to be credited under his birth name, Scott Engel, for the only time, on Scott 4.

The album was split between the opening ten original compositions and five interpretations of middle-of-the-road standards and pop songs. Walker also took the unusual step of sharing his writing credits with his new manager Ady Semel. Walker summarised the collaboration with Semel: "He acts as my censor, vetting all my lyrics and striking out the words likely to harm old ladies". Walker also brought in Esther Ofarim, another singer managed by Semel, as a guest vocalist on "Long About Now".

Walker wrote the songs for the album quickly while on a working holiday in Greece in September 1970. The album was recorded late that same year between September and November 1970, with Walker's usual Philips Studio team consisting of producer Johnny Franz, engineer Peter J. Olliff, and both Angela Morley (credited as Wally Stott) and Peter Knight directing the musical arrangements.

The album marked the last time Walker would release any original material until the Walker Brothers' album Nite Flights in 1978.

== Release ==
The album was first released in December 1970. It was subsequently deleted and was not available for over 25 years. Receiving poor reviews upon release, the album was later reassessed much more favourably and was eventually reissued in the UK on CD by BGO Records in August 1996, with new liner notes. This new edition fell out of print before a second CD reissue followed in 2008 by the US label Water Records. The album was reissued again on 3 June 2013 as part of a 5-CD set entitled Scott - 'The Collection 1967-1970'.

The original liner notes were by Semel, with cover photography by Michael Joseph.

== Reception ==
Professional ratings
Review scores
Source	Rating
AllMusic	2.5/5 stars
Pitchfork Media	8.4/10

At the time of release, 'Til the Band Comes In received negative reviews by the majority of critics. Critical reception of the album has warmed considerably since Walker was critically reappraised in the decades following the Walker Brothers' 1978 album Nite Flights. The album is now classed as a worthy if somewhat compromised follow up to Scott 4.

In retrospective reviews, Scott Plagenhoef of Pitchfork described Walker's originals "[as] a step down from those on his previous two albums" but "worthwhile nonetheless". Dave Thompson of AllMusic was less charitable, calling "Thanks for Chicago Mr. James" and "Joe" "[the] album's sole concessions to such matters as reputation", and "while Walker's first four albums remain essential listening, and the TV LP at least has its moments, Til the Band Comes In is best left waiting at the stage door. Some 'lost classics' were lost with good reason."

== Track listing ==
All tracks are written by Scott Walker and Ady Semel, except where noted.

Side one
No.	Title	Length
1.	"Prologue"	1:23
2.	"Little Things (That Keep Us Together)"	2:18
3.	"Joe"	3:42
4.	"Thanks for Chicago Mr. James"	2:18
5.	"Long About Now" (Sung by Esther Ofarim)	2:06
6.	"Time Operator"	3:37
7.	"Jean the Machine"	2:10
8.	"Cowbells Shakin'"	1:06

Side two
No.	Title	Writer(s)	Length
1.	"'Til the Band Comes In"		3:50
2.	"The War Is Over (Sleepers)"		3:36
3.	"Stormy"	Buddy Buie, J. R. Cobb	3:09
4.	"The Hills of Yesterday"	Paul F. Webster, Henry Mancini	2:45
5.	"Reuben James"	Barry J. Etris, Alex Harvey	3:03
6.	"What Are You Doing the Rest of Your Life"	Alan Bergman, Marilyn Bergman, Michel Legrand	3:36
7.	"It's Over"	Jimmie F. Rodgers	2:26

== Personnel ==
- Scott Walker – vocals
- Esther Ofarim – vocals (5)
- John Franz – producer
- Ady Semel – liner notes
- Wally Stott – musical arranger (1–10)
- Peter Knight – musical arranger (11–15)
- Peter Olliff – engineer
- Michael Joseph – cover photograph

== Release history ==
Region	Date	Label	Format	Catalogue
United Kingdom	December 1970	Philips	LP	SBL 7913
United Kingdom	August 12, 1996	BGO Records	CD	6308 035
United States	September 2, 2008	Water Records	CD	water226
