= Scott Walker (singer) =

British-American musician (1943–2019)

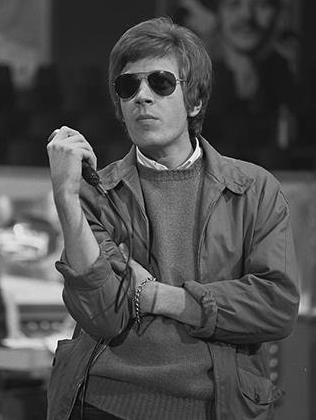
- Walker on Dutch TV, 1968

Background information
- Born: Noel Scott Engel; January 9, 1943; Hamilton, Ohio, U.S.
- Died: March 22, 2019 (aged 76) London, England
- Genres: Pop; rock; avant-garde; experimental
- Occupations: Singer-songwriter; record producer; multi-instrumentalist
- Instruments: Vocals; guitar; bass guitar; keyboards
- Years active: 1958–2019
- Labels: Philips/Fontana; Columbia; Virgin; Drag City; 4AD
- Formerly of: The Walker Brothers
- Website: 4ad.com/artists/scottwalker

Noel Scott Engel (January 9, 1943 – March 22, 2019), better known by his stage name Scott Walker, was an American-British singer-songwriter, composer, and record producer. Walker was known for his emotive baritone voice and his unorthodox career path, which took him from being a teen pop icon in the 1960s to an avant-garde musician from the 1990s to his death. Walker was most successful in the United Kingdom, where he achieved fame as a member of pop trio the Walker Brothers, who scored several hit singles during the mid-1960s, including two number-one hits on the UK singles chart with "Make It Easy on Yourself" (1965) and "The Sun Ain't Gonna Shine Anymore" (1966). He lived in the UK from 1965 onwards, and became a UK citizen in 1970.

After the Walker Brothers split in 1967, he began a solo career with the album Scott later that year. Strongly inspired by Belgian singer-songwriter Jacques Brel, Walker moved toward an increasingly challenging musical and lyrical style on the late 1960s baroque pop albums Scott 2 (1968), which reached number one in the UK; Scott 3 (1969); and Scott 4 (1969). After Scott 4 and its follow-up 'Til the Band Comes In (1970) failed commercially, Walker released a number of MOR covers albums, which he later disowned, to appease record companies. He reunited with the Walker Brothers in the mid-1970s. They achieved a top-ten single with "No Regrets" in 1975, while their final album, Nite Flights (1978), marked the beginning of Walker's move towards the avant-garde.

During the 1980s, Walker released only one album, Climate of Hunter (1984). Its follow-up, Tilt (1995), saw his work now fully immersed in a dark and avant-garde musical and lyrical idiom. Walker progressed this style through The Drift (2006); Bish Bosch (2012); and Soused (2014), a collaboration with American drone metal band Sunn O))). The Guardian reflected on Walker's stylistic evolution in 2012: "imagine Andy Williams reinventing himself as Stockhausen". Walker also undertook several side projects during the 1990s, 2000s and 2010s, including film soundtracks and songwriting and production for other artists.

Walker continued to record until 2018, the year before his death. His 1960s recordings were highly regarded by the 1980s UK underground music scene, and gained a cult following. He was described by the BBC as "one of the most enigmatic and influential figures in rock history".

== Life and career ==
=== Early life ===
Noel Scott Engel was born on January 9, 1943, in Hamilton, Ohio, United States, the son of Elizabeth Marie (Fortier), who was from Montreal, Quebec, and Noel Walter Engel. His father was an oil industry manager whose work led the family to successive homes in Ohio, Texas, Colorado, and New York. Engel and his mother settled in California in 1956. Engel was interested in both music and performance and spent time as a child actor and singer in the mid to late 1950s, including roles in the Broadway musicals Pipe Dream and Plain and Fancy. Championed by singer and TV host Eddie Fisher, he appeared several times on Fisher's TV program. Engel cut some records including one named "Misery", which saw him briefly promoted as a teen idol.

Upon his arrival in Los Angeles, Engel had already changed both his taste and his direction. Interested in the cool jazz of Stan Kenton and Bill Evans, he was a self-confessed "Continental suit-wearing natural enemy of the Californian surfer" and a fan of European cinema (in particular Ingmar Bergman, Federico Fellini, and Robert Bresson) and the writings of the Beat Generation. Engel attended Hollywood Professional School for several years and eventually attended art school, furthering his interests in cinema and literature. Engel played bass guitar proficiently enough to get work as a session musician in Los Angeles as a teenager.

In 1961, after playing with the Routers, he met guitarist and singer John Maus, who was using the stage name John Walker on a fake ID to enable him to perform in clubs while underaged. The two formed a band, Judy and the Gents, to back John Walker's sister Judy Maus, before joining other musicians to tour as the Surfaris (although they did not play on the Surfaris' records). In early 1964, Engel and John Walker began working together as the Walker Brothers; later in the year, drummer Gary Leeds (soon rechristened Gary Walker) joined, and his father financed the trio's first trip to the UK.

=== 1964–1967: The Walker Brothers ===
As a trio, the Walker Brothers cultivated a glossy-haired and handsome familial image. Prompted by Maus, each of the members took "Walker" as their stage surname. Scott continued to use the name Walker thereafter, with the brief exception of returning to his birth name for the original 1969 release of Scott 4 and in songwriting credits. Initially, John served as guitarist and main lead singer of the trio, with Gary on drums and Scott playing bass guitar and mostly singing harmony vocals. By early 1965, the group had made appearances on TV shows Hollywood A Go-Go and Shindig and had made initial recordings, but the start of their real success lay in the future and overseas.

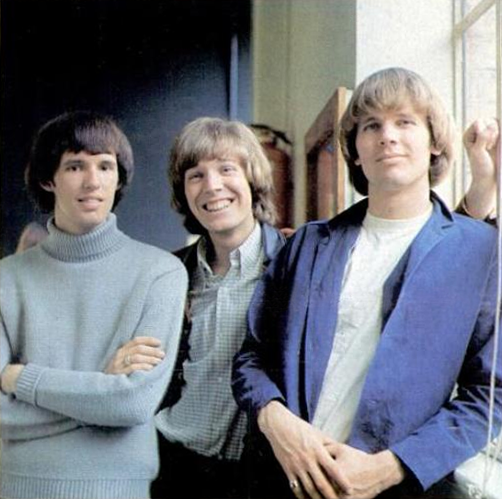
The Walker Brothers in 1965, with Scott in the middle

While working as a session drummer, Leeds had recently toured the United Kingdom with P.J. Proby and persuaded both John and Scott to try their luck with him on the British pop scene. The Walker Brothers arrived in London in early 1965. Their first single, "Pretty Girls Everywhere" (with John still as lead singer), failed to chart. Their next single, "Love Her" – with Scott's deeper baritone in the lead – made the UK Top 20 and he became the group's main singer from this point on.

The Walker Brothers' next single, "Make It Easy on Yourself", a Bacharach/David ballad, went to No. 1 on the UK Singles Chart (No. 16 on the U.S. charts) on release in August 1965. After hitting again with "My Ship Is Coming In" (No. 3 UK), their second No. 1 (No. 13 U.S.), "The Sun Ain't Gonna Shine Anymore", shot to the top in early 1966; shortly thereafter, their fan club grew to contain more members than the official fan club of the Beatles.

Between 1965 and 1967, the group released the albums Take It Easy with the Walker Brothers (1965), Portrait (1966), and Images (1967), and two EPs, I Need You and Solo John/Solo Scott (both 1966). Following "The Sun Ain't Gonna Shine Anymore", the group's subsequent singles in 1966 were "(Baby) You Don't Have to Tell Me" (No. 13 UK), "Another Tear Falls" (No. 12 UK) and "Deadlier Than the Male" (No. 32 UK), the latter a co-write between Scott and Johnny Franz for the soundtrack of the film of the same name, while 1967 brought two more singles in "Stay With Me Baby" and "Walking in the Rain" (both of which reached No. 26 in the UK).

The Walkers' 1960s sound mixed Phil Spector's "wall of sound" technique with symphonic orchestrations featuring Britain's top musicians and arrangers, notably Ivor Raymonde. Scott served as effective co-producer of the band's records throughout this period, alongside their named producer Johnny Franz and engineer Peter Oliff. Many of their earlier numbers had a driving beat, but with the release of their third album, Images, in 1967, ballads predominated.

By 1967, John Walker's musical influence on the Walker Brothers had waned (although on Images he sang lead on a cover of "Blueberry Hill" and contributed two original compositions), which led to tensions between him and Scott. At the same time, Scott was finding the group a chafing experience: "There was a lot of pressure. I was coming up with all the material for the boys, and I was having to find songs and getting the sessions together. Everyone relied on me, and it just got on top of me. I think I just got irritated with it all." His desire to shake off his pop pin-up reputation might have influenced his drinking habits. In 1967 he told one British journalist that he was drinking “a bottle of wine and a bottle of Scotch a day” with the sole purpose, he claimed, of wanting to coarsen the baritone voice he thought sounded too sweet.

Artistic differences and the stresses stemming from overwhelming pop stardom led to the break-up of the Walker Brothers in the summer of 1967, although they reunited temporarily for a tour of Japan in 1968.

=== 1967–1974: Solo work ===
For his solo career, Walker shed the Walker Brothers' mantle and worked in a style clearly glimpsed on Images. Initially, this led to a continuation of his previous band's success. Walker's first four solo albums — Scott (1967), Scott 2 (1968), Scott 3, and Scott Walker Sings Songs from his TV Series (both 1969) — all sold in large numbers, with Scott 2 topping the British charts. Walker also achieved two UK Top 20 singles during this period with "Joanna" (1968) and "Lights of Cincinnati" (1969).

During this period, Walker combined his earlier teen appeal with a darker, more idiosyncratic approach (which had been hinted at in songs like "Orpheus" on the Images album). While his vocal style remained consistent with the Walker Brothers, he now drove a fine line between classic ballads, Broadway hits and his own compositions, and also included risqué recordings of Jacques Brel songs (as translated by Mort Shuman, who was also responsible for the hit musical Jacques Brel is Alive and Well and Living in Paris). Walker's own original songs of this period were influenced by Brel and Léo Ferré as he explored European musical roots while expressing his own American experience and reaching a new maturity as a recording artist.

Walker continued to grow as a producer. In 1968 (during the brief Walker Brothers reunion and tour of Japan), he produced a single with the Japanese rock group the Carnabeats, featuring Gary Walker on vocals. Upon his return to the UK, he produced a solo album for the Walker Brothers' musical director and guitarist Terry Smith. In 1968, Walker also produced Ray Warleigh's First Album. According to Anthony Reynolds, "[Warleigh's] album, recorded on December 13 and released in the following year, had little in common with the more esoteric progressive jazz that Scott was digging at the time, and the result veered more toward pleasantly middle-of-the-road muzak than the jazz fusion just around the corner." In 1968, Scott Walker also produced John Walker's solo single "Woman".

Walker's own relationship with fame, and the concentrated attention which it brought to him, remained a problem for his emotional well-being. He became reclusive and increasingly distanced from his audience. In 1968 he threw himself into an intense study of contemporary and classical music, which included a sojourn in Quarr Abbey, a Catholic Benedictine monastery in Ryde on the Isle of Wight, to study Gregorian chant, building on an interest in lieder and classical musical modes.

At the peak of his fame in 1969, Walker was given his own BBC TV series, Scott, featuring solo Walker performances of ballads, big band standards, Brel songs, and his own compositions. Archival footage of the show is extremely rare as none of the footage conserved, though surviving audio recordings from the show were released in 2019 as the box set Live on Air 1968-1969. Scott 3, released in early 1969, was Walker's first album to be dominated by his own songwriting, though its follow-up, mid-1969's Scott Walker Sings Songs from his TV Series, featured no original material and exemplified the problems he was having in failing to balance his own creative desires with the demands of the entertainment industry and of his manager Maurice King, who seemed determined to mould his protégé into a new Andy Williams or Frank Sinatra. Despite the failure of the Scott TV series, the companion album was a commercial success, reaching the top 10 of the UK Albums Chart - Walker's last album to do so. Around this time, Walker also recorded the title song for the French/Italian film Une Corde, Un Colt (The Rope and the Colt in English), and in 1970 he recorded "I Still See You" for the soundtrack of the film The Go-Between.

Having parted company with King, Walker released his fifth solo LP – Scott 4 – at the end of 1969. Compensating for the previous all-covers album, this was his first album to be made up entirely of self-penned material. It has been speculated that Walker's decision to release Scott 4 under his birth name of Scott Engel contributed to its chart failure. All subsequent re-issues of the album have been released under his stage name. As Sean O'Hagan wrote in The Guardian, "Now recognised as one of his greatest recordings, it sold poorly. The world was not ready for the existentialist musings of a pop singer whose touchstones were the films of Kurosawa and Bergman and the novels of Kafka and Camus."

Walker then entered a period of self-confessed artistic decline, during which he spent five years making records "by rote, just to get out of contract" and consoling himself with drink. His next album, 1970's 'Til the Band Comes In, showed a pronounced split between its two sides. Side A featured original material (mostly co-written with new manager Ady Semel) while side B consisted almost entirely of cover versions. Although commercially and critically unsuccessful at the time, 'Til the Band Comes In has since been generally regarded as a worthy but compromised follow-up to Scott 4. Subsequent releases saw Walker revert to cover versions of popular film tunes, easy listening standards and a serious flirtation with country music. All of his next four albums - The Moviegoer (1972), Any Day Now, Stretch (both 1973), and We Had It All (1974) - feature no original material whatsoever. These four albums and the 1969 TV Series album would subsequently be disowned by Walker, and he would prevent them from ever being issued on CD (though Stretch and We Had It All did receive a CD release, without Walker's approval, by independent label BGO Records in the late 1990s).

In the 2006 documentary Scott Walker: 30 Century Man, Walker describes these as his "lost years" in terms of creativity. He has also confessed to having surrendered his direction due to outside pressure:

The record company called me in [following the commercial failure of Scott 4] and carpeted me and said you've got to make a commercial record for us... I was acting in bad faith for many years during that time... I was trying to hang on. I should have stopped. I should have said, 'OK, forget it' and walked away. But I thought if I keep hanging on and making these bloody awful records... this is going to turn round if I just hang in long enough, and it didn't. It went from bad to worse...

=== 1975–1978: The Walker Brothers reunite ===
By the mid-1970s, Walker's career was at its nadir, and he joined back up with John Maus and Gary Leeds to revive the Walker Brothers in 1975. Their comeback single, a cover of the Tom Rush song "No Regrets", reached number 7 in the UK Singles Chart, though the parent album, also titled No Regrets, peaked at only number 49 in the UK Albums Chart. The two singles from the next album Lines - its title track (which Scott regarded as the best single the group ever released) and "We're All Alone" - both failed to chart, and the album fared no better. Neither No Regrets or Lines included any original material by Scott.

With the imminent demise of their record label, the Walkers collaborated on an album of original material that was in stark contrast to the soft rock/easy listening style of the previous two albums. The resulting album, Nite Flights, was released in 1978 with each of the Brothers writing and singing their own compositions (the opening four songs by Scott, the middle two by Gary and the final four by John). Scott's four songs – "Shut Out", "Fat Mama Kick", "Nite Flights" and "The Electrician" – were his first original compositions since 'Til the Band Comes In, and represented his first steps away from the MOR image and sound he had cultivated since the commercial failure of Scott 4. The extremely dark and discomforting sound of Scott's songs, particularly "The Electrician", was to prove a forerunner to the direction of his future solo work.

In spite of a warm critical reception (with Scott's contributions particularly lauded), sales figures for Nite Flights were ultimately as poor as those of Lines. The supporting tour saw the band concentrating on the old hits and ignoring the songs from their new record. Apparently now fated for a stagnant career on the revival circuit, the Walker Brothers lost heart and interest, compounded by Scott's increasing reluctance to sing live. By the end of 1978, now without a record deal, the group drifted apart again, and Scott Walker entered a six-year period out of the public eye.

=== 1979–1995: Return to solo career ===
In 1979, Walker connected with Dire Straits manager Ed Bicknell and signed with Virgin Records, though it would be five years before he completed his next album. In the meantime, interest in his work was stimulated by the 1981 compilation album Fire Escape in the Sky – The Godlike Genius of Scott Walker, containing tracks selected by Julian Cope and released by independent label Zoo Records, which reached number 14 on the UK Independent Chart. Building on the critical and sales momentum of the compilation, his old label Phillips responded by issuing several compilations during the early 1980s, including Scott Walker Sings Jacques Brel.

In 1984, Walker released his first solo album in ten years, Climate of Hunter. The album furthered the complex and unnerving approach Walker had established on Nite Flights. While based loosely within the field of 1980s rock music, and featuring guest appearances by contemporary stars Billy Ocean and Mark Knopfler, it had a fragmented and trance-like approach. Many of the eight songs lacked either titles ("Track Three", "Track Five" etc.) or easily identifiable melody, with only Walker's sonorous voice as the link to previous work. Like Nite Flights before it, Climate of Hunter was met with critical praise but low sales. Plans to tour were made but never came to fruition. A second album for Virgin was begun in 1985, with Brian Eno and Daniel Lanois producing and Robert Fripp on guitar, but was abandoned after early sessions. Soon afterwards, Walker was dropped by the label, and ceased to be managed by Bicknell, who later commented that his relationship with Walker "eventually just petered out."

Walker spent the late 1980s away from music, with only a brief cameo appearance in a 1987 Britvic TV advert (alongside other 1960s pop icons) to maintain his profile. He did not return to public attention until the early 1990s when his solo and Walker Brothers work was critically reappraised again. Two compilation albums were issued in 1990 - the Walker Brothers' After the Lights Go Out – The Best of 1965–1967 and Scott Walker's Boy Child – The Best of 1967–1970 - which received critical praise, while a more mainstream-aimed compilation, No Regrets – The Best of Scott Walker and The Walker Brothers 1965–1976, hit number 4 on the UK Albums Chart in 1992. During that same year, Scott, Scott 2, Scott 3, and Scott 4 were issued on CD for the first time, while 'Til the Band Comes In and all of the Walker Brothers' albums would receive CD releases later in the 1990s. Walker's own return to current active work was gradual and cautious. Having signed to Fontana Records, 1993 saw him co-write and co-perform (with Goran Bregović) the single "Man From Reno" for the soundtrack of the film Toxic Affair, while David Bowie covered Scott's song "Nite Flights" on his Black Tie White Noise album, which also contained the Walker-inspired 'You've Been Around'.

Tilt, Walker's first album for eleven years, was released in 1995, developing and expanding the working methods explored on Climate of Hunter. Variously described as "an anti-matter collision of rock and modern classical music", as "Samuel Beckett at La Scala" and as "indescribably barren and unutterably bleak... the wind that buffets the gothic cathedrals of everyone's favorite nightmares", it was more consciously avant-garde than its predecessor with Walker now revealed as a fully-fledged modernist composer. Although Walker was backed by a full orchestra again, this time he was also accompanied by alarming percussion and industrial effects; and while album opener "Farmer in the City" was a melodic piece, albeit a very dark one, the remaining pieces were harsh and demandingly avant-garde. Lyrically, subject matter included the life and murder of Pier Paolo Pasolini (and his relationship with Ninetto Davoli), cockfighting, the Holocaust, the First Gulf War, a conflation of the trials of Adolf Eichmann and Caroline of Brunswick, and a man talking to the corpse of Che Guevara.

=== 1996–2005: Interim work ===
In 1996, Walker covered the Bob Dylan song "I Threw It All Away" under the direction of Nick Cave for inclusion in the soundtrack for the film To Have and to Hold. In 1998, in a rare return to straightforward balladeering, he recorded the David Arnold song "Only Myself to Blame" (for the soundtrack of the Bond film The World Is Not Enough) and also wrote and produced the soundtrack for the Léos Carax film Pola X, which was released as an album. In 1999, he wrote and produced two songs - "Scope J" and "Lullaby" - for Ute Lemper on her album Punishing Kiss. "Lullaby" is only available as a bonus track on the Japanese version of the CD.

In 2000, Walker curated the London South Bank Centre's annual summer live music festival, Meltdown, which has a tradition of celebrity curators. He did not perform at Meltdown himself, but wrote the music for the Richard Alston Dance Project item Thimblerigging. The following year he served as producer on Pulp's 2001 album We Love Life (whose track "Bad Cover Version" includes a mocking reference to the poor quality of "the second side of 'Til The Band Comes In").

In October 2003, Walker was given an award for his contribution to music by Q magazine, presented by Jarvis Cocker of Pulp. Walker received a standing ovation at the presentation. This award had been presented only twice before, the first time to Phil Spector, and the second to Brian Eno. The release of a retrospective box set, 5 Easy Pieces, comprising five themed discs spanning Walker's work with the Walker Brothers, his solo career (including film soundtrack work), and the two pieces composed for Ute Lemper, followed soon after. The British independent label 4AD Records signed Walker in early 2004.

=== 2006–2019: Later years ===
On May 8, 2006, Scott Walker released The Drift, his first album in eleven years (the same amount of time that separated his previous two albums Climate of Hunter and Tilt). Critical acclaim for the album garnered a Metacritic score of 85.

In both composition and atmosphere, The Drift was a continuation of the surreal, menacing, partially abstract approach displayed on Tilt. It featured jarring contrasts between loud and quiet sections; instrumentation was similar to Tilt in the use of rock instruments and a large orchestra, but the album also interpolated unnerving sound effects such as the distressed braying of a donkey, a demoniac Donald Duck impression, and (during a recording sequence captured on film) an orchestral percussionist punching a large cut of raw meat. Lyrical subjects included torture, disease, the relationship and eventual shared death of Mussolini and his mistress Clara Petacci, and a conflation of the 9/11 attacks with a nightmare shared by Elvis Presley and his dead twin brother Jesse. In contemporary interviews, Walker appeared more at ease with media attention, revealing a wish to produce albums more frequently and hinting at significant changes in the nature of his own material if and when it suits him. Although he mentioned the possibility of touring again with a compact, five-piece band in an interview with The Wire this never transpired.

In June 2006, Mojo and radio honored Scott Walker with the MOJO Icon Award: "Voted for by Mojo readers and Mojo4music users, the recipient of this award has enjoyed a spectacular career on a global scale". It was presented by Phil Alexander. A documentary film, Scott Walker: 30 Century Man, was completed in 2006 by filmmaker Stephen Kijak. Interviews were recorded with David Bowie (executive producer of the film), Brian Eno, Radiohead, Sting, Gavin Friday, Jarvis Cocker, Richard Hawley, Cathal Coughlan and many musicians associated with Walker over the years. The World Premiere of Scott Walker: 30 Century Man took place as part of the 50th London Film Festival. When The Independent released its list of "Ten must-see films" at the 50th London Film Festival, Scott Walker: 30 Century Man, was among them. A documentary on Walker containing a substantial amount of footage from the film was shown on BBC1 in May 2007 as part of the Imagine... strand, presented by Alan Yentob.

Walker released "Darkness" as part of Plague Songs, an album of songs for the Margate Exodus project, a re-telling of the Book of Exodus, the story of Moses and his search for the Promised Land. Ten singer-songwriters were commissioned by Artangel to write and record a song inspired by one of the ten biblical plagues. Walker's evocation of "Darkness" appears as the ninth.

On September 24, 2007, Walker released And Who Shall Go to the Ball? And What Shall Go to the Ball? as a limited, never-to-be-re-pressed edition. The 24-minute instrumental work was performed by the London Sinfonietta with solo cellist Philip Sheppard as music to a performance by London-based CandoCo Dance Company. The recording is currently unavailable. From November 13 to 15, 2008, Drifting and Tilting: The Songs of Scott Walker was staged at The Barbican, in London. It comprised eight songs, two from Tilt – "Farmer in the City" and "Patriot (a single)" – and the rest from The Drift: "Cossacks Are", "Jesse", "Clara (Benito's Dream)", "Buzzers", "Jolson and Jones" and "Cue". Each song was presented in a music-theatre manner, with the vocal parts taken by a number of singers, including Jarvis Cocker, Damon Albarn and Dot Allison. Walker collaborated with Bat for Lashes on the song "The Big Sleep" from her 2009 album Two Suns. He wrote the score for the ROH2 production of Jean Cocteau's 1932 play Duet for One, which was staged in the Linbury Studio in June 2011.

Walker's final solo album, Bish Bosch, was released on December 3, 2012, and was received with generally favourable reviews. In 2014, Walker collaborated with the American drone metal duo Sunn O))) on Soused. A year later, Walker composed the score for Brady Corbet's film The Childhood of a Leader; this was followed in 2018 by the score for Corbet's Vox Lux, which also featured music by Australian singer-songwriter Sia.

== Collaborations ==
As a record producer and guest performer, Walker worked with a number of artists and bands, including Pulp, Ute Lemper, Sunn O))), and Bat for Lashes.

== Personal life ==
Walker was survived by his daughter, Nicola Lee, from his marriage to Mette Teglbjaerg, which ended in divorce, and his granddaughter, Emmi-Lee, who lives with her mother in Denmark.

An only child, Walker was always reclusive and reluctant to discuss his private life. "He suffered depression, drank too much, took too many drugs and, like many of the great musicians of the 1960s, went missing in action", reported Simon Hattenstone in 2012. "He rarely talks to the media" and "has come across as sombre and taciturn." When asked, Walker agreed that he had found fame hard to deal with. "Well, I was an intense young guy." Walker attempted suicide in August 1966, when he was found unconscious in his London apartment with the gas stove on and all the windows closed.

== Death ==
Walker died at the age of 76 in London on March 22, 2019. His death was announced three days later by his record company 4AD, which announced cancer as the cause of death, while calling him "a unique and challenging titan at the forefront of British music". Tributes included those from Thom Yorke, Marc Almond and Neil Hannon.

== Artistry and compositional approach ==
Initially working as an interpreter of other people's songs, Scott Walker had developed his own songwriting skills by the heyday of the Walker Brothers and by the time of his first solo album in 1967. In a 1984 interview he spoke of difficulty in writing songs: "I don't write songs for pleasure. I can only write when I have to – like I'm under contract, or to finish an album."

Walker's late 1960s and 1970s work was relatively conventional. On a superficial level, it followed the melodic orchestral pop template used by singers such as Frank Sinatra, Andy Williams and Jack Jones – mainstream artists whose career path he was initially expected to follow. Crucial differences came via the more avant-garde orchestrations of his arrangers (primarily Angela Morley (at the time known as Wally Stott), Peter Knight and Reg Guest) and by Walker's own approach to lyrics, which involved a cinematic mise-en-scene approach once described as "unsettling short stories, all the more creepy for their delicate orchestral backdrop." As his solo career progressed, Walker began working political themes into his lyrics. Among the first such songs of his career was "The Old Man's Back Again (Dedicated to the Neo-Stalinist Regime)" from Scott 4, a comment on the Warsaw Pact invasion of Czechoslovakia. Further references came via his dramatisation of the work of a CIA torturer on "The Electrician" from Nite Flights.

Walker's next artistic development as a songwriter came when he jettisoned his remaining conventional lyrical concerns along with his remaining connections to formal popular song. The New York Times described Walker as arriving at "the point where he barely needs melody anymore. Instead, there are whirring synthesizers, great orchestral blocks of sound, noises of unknown provenance. Despite the radical alteration of his methods, Walker commented that he did not consider himself a "composer" in the established sense of the term: "I think of myself as a songwriter, but I agree they are maybe not traditional songs. I know what people mean, but what else can you call them?"

Walker described his lyrical technique (assembling short blocks of text containing images that are sometimes seemingly unconnected and disparate from each other) as being similar to "a general, assembling troops on the battlefield." The Wire has noted that the short blocks of white-on-black text presented in the CD insert for The Drift is reflective of this. The roots of this compositional technique are apparent as early as the Scott Walker tracks on Nite Flights – the lyrics insert for the album clearly feature the technique, albeit with a black text on a white background.

Walker stated in the documentary film Scott Walker: 30 Century Man and in numerous interviews that for his entire career he had not listened to any of his own work after completion, either due to exhaustion from the project or self-criticism.

== Legacy ==
In 2018, Walker published Sundog, a book of selected lyrics. The book is divided into six sections: "The 60s", "Tilt", "The Drift", "Bish Bosch", "Soused" and "New Songs". The foreword to the book was written by Irish novelist Eimear McBride.

Many artists have expressed their admiration for Walker or cited him as an influence, including David Bowie, Alex Turner, Marc Almond, Bauhaus, Goldfrapp, Neil Hannon of The Divine Comedy, Julian Cope (who compiled the Fire Escape in the Sky: The Godlike Genius of Scott Walker compilation in 1981), Jarvis Cocker, Anohni, Thom Yorke and Radiohead, Steven Wilson of Porcupine Tree, and Mikael Åkerfeldt of Opeth (particularly expressed in their joint project Storm Corrosion), Tim Bowness of No-Man, Leonard Cohen, Efterklang, East India Youth, Kevin Hufnagel, Ihsahn, Russell Mills, Dennis Rea, John Baizley of Baroness, Brian Eno. and Beck. The filmmaker Brady Corbet dedicated his 2024 film The Brutalist to Walker’s memory.

== Discography ==
- Scott (1967)
- Scott 2 (1968)
- Scott 3 (1969)
- Scott Walker Sings Songs from his T.V. Series (1969)
- Scott 4 (1969)
- 'Til the Band Comes In (1970)
- The Moviegoer (1972)
- Any Day Now (1973)
- Stretch (1973)
- We Had It All (1974)
- Climate of Hunter (1984)
- Tilt (1995)
- Pola X OST (1999)
- The Drift (2006)
- And Who Shall Go to the Ball? And What Shall Go to the Ball? EP (2007)
- Bish Bosch (2012)
- Soused (2014, with Sunn O))))
- The Childhood of a Leader OST (2016)
- Vox Lux OST (2018)
