= Peter Knight (composer) =

English conductor, composer and arranger (1917–1985)

- Born: Peter Norman Knight; 23 June 1917; Exmouth, Devon, England
- Died: 30 July 1985 (aged 68)
- Occupations: Conductor; composer; arranger
- Years active: 1930s–1980s
- Formerly of: Ambrose Orchestra; Sydney Lipton; Peter Knight Singers

Peter Norman Knight (23 June 1917 – 30 July 1985) was an English conductor, composer and arranger.

== Early career ==
Knight was born in Exmouth, Devon, England. He was educated at Sutton High School in Plymouth and (showing an aptitude for music very early) studied piano, harmony and counterpoint privately. His first broadcast was in 1924 at the age of seven, a piano solo on Children's Hour from the BBC's studio in Plymouth. Before World War II, he was an active semi-professional musician while working at the Inland Revenue in Torquay, and then in London.

Knight joined the Ambrose Orchestra for a short spell in 1939, but soon enlisted in the Royal Air Force. Following the Second World War, Knight joined the Sydney Lipton Band, resident at the Grosvenor House Hotel in London, where he stayed for four years, leaving to form the Peter Knight Singers with his wife Babs for broadcasting and recording work. The group remained active for 30 years. After producing countless vocal scores, Knight was commissioned to produce full orchestrations for various artists, and soon had his own orchestra, The Peter Knight Orchestra.

In the early 1950s, Knight was a frequent orchestrator and musical director in London's West End, working on revue shows such as Cockles and Champagne (Saville Theatre, 1954) and The Jazz Train (Piccadilly Theatre, 1955). This work led to his appointment as musical director for Granada Television at the end of the 1950s. In 1964, he served as musical director for a touring version of the Anthony Newley musical The Roar of the Greasepaint – The Smell of the Crowd.

== Television and film ==
Knight worked with light entertainment stars including Petula Clark, Marty Wilde, Sammy Davis Jr., and Edmund Hockridge, and in shows ranging from Spot the Tune (1956) with Jackie Rae and Marion Ryan to the comedy series Home to Roost (1985). He also composed the scores to the feature films Curse of the Crimson Altar (1968, starring Boris Karloff) and Sunstruck (1972, starring Harry Secombe). In between, other highlights of his career were as follows:

- Orchestra director for many episodes of The Morecambe and Wise Show (1969–77)
- Conductor for The Last Goon Show of All (1972)
- Orchestrator of the music for the Roman Polanski film Tess (1979)
- Conductor and orchestrator for the film Ghost Story (1981)
- Orchestrator and conductor of the music for the Jean-Jacques Annaud film Quest for Fire (1981)
- Orchestrator of the music for the film The Dark Crystal (1982)

Following his death, Yorkshire Television launched the annual Peter Knight Award to honour excellence in musical arranging.

== Pop music ==
Knight's involvement with pop music was varied. He was conductor for many songs for Scott Walker's 1960's period, and became famous for his rich lush orchestration for The Moody Blues' Days of Future Passed, most widely known through the single "Nights in White Satin". Later on, he continued his work with members of The Moody Blues—Justin Hayward and John Lodge—on three songs for the album Blue Jays, released in 1975.

Richard Carpenter invited Knight to fly to Los Angeles in 1977 in order to generate a similar sound for The Carpenters "Calling Occupants of Interplanetary Craft" (1977). He also gave a similar treatment to The Carpenters' version of "Don't Cry for Me Argentina". Knight collaborated with The Carpenters on their two Christmas Special Television Shows in 1977 and 1978, for which he was the principal arranger. On the special edition CD of the music from these two shows, Knight arranged three of the extended medleys and ten of the single charts.

Knight also wrote arrangements for the King's Singers, including the Airwave song "You are the New Day", now a best-selling title in the US.

Knight recorded a single, "Within You, Without You", the George Harrison song from the Sgt. Pepper's Lonely Hearts Club Band album, released under the name Peter Knight and His Orchestra. This was part of a project to release the entire album in an orchestral version. It was released in 1967 on the Mercury label.

== Personal life and death ==
Knight was married to Babs. He died of lung cancer, aged 68, in 1985.

== Compositions ==
- Theme for Thank Your Lucky Stars (1961)
- The Flight of the Heron (1968) – drama series
- Duty Free (1984–86) – TV comedy series
- Home to Roost (1986–89) – TV comedy series

== Discography ==
- Onward Christian Soldiers (Pye, 1965)
- Western Heritage (Decca, 1965) with Ted Hockridge
- Voices in the Night (Deram, 1967)
- Peter Knight Orchestra & Chorus, The Old Fashioned Way (Philips, 1974)
