= The Walker Brothers discography =

Discography of American pop group

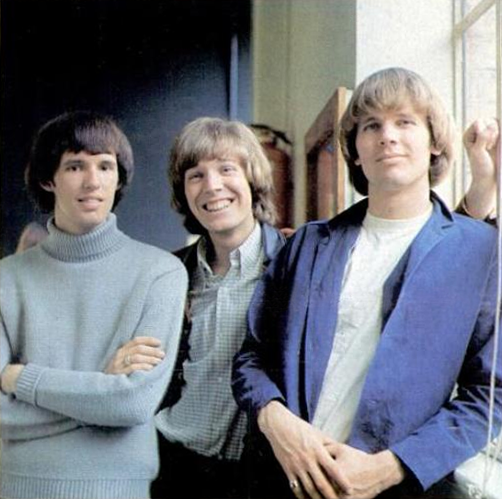
- The Walker Brothers in 1965
- Studio albums: 8
- Extended plays: 3
- Live albums: 1
- Compilation albums: 10
- Singles: 20
- B-sides: 20

The discography of American pop group The Walker Brothers consists of eight studio albums, two of which were created for the American market, one live album, three extended plays, twenty singles, twenty b-sides and numerous compilations - several of which are listed here.

== Studio albums ==
Year	Album details	Chart positions			
Year	Album details	UK	AUS	GER	NL
1965	Take It Easy with the Walker Brothers: Released: November 1965; Labels: Philips Records	3	—	7	—
1965	Introducing The Walker Brothers (US only): Released: December 1965; Labels: Smash Records	—	—	—	—
1966	Portrait: Released: August 1966; Labels: Philips	3	—	8	—
1966	The Sun Ain't Gonna Shine Anymore (US only): Released: August 1966; Labels: Smash	—	—	—	—
1967	Images: Released: March 1967; Labels: Philips	6	—	23	—
1975	No Regrets: Released: October 1975; Labels: GTO Records	49	39	—	13
1976	Lines: Released: October 1976; Labels: GTO	—	—	—	—
1978	Nite Flights: Released: July 1978; Labels: GTO	—	—	—	—

== Live albums ==
- The Walker Brothers in Japan (Japan 1968, Philips / UK 1987, Bam Caruso)

== Compilation albums ==
- The Walker Brothers' Story (1967, Philips) – UK #9
- The Fabulous Walker Brothers (1969, Fontana Records)
- The Immortal Walker Brothers (1969, Fontana)
- Make It Easy on Yourself (1972, Phillips)
- Hits (1982, Phillips)
- After the Lights Go Out – The Best of 1965–1967 (1990, Polygram Records)
- No Regrets – The Best of Scott Walker and The Walker Brothers 1965–1976 (1992, Polygram) – UK #4, BPI: Gold
- If You Could Hear Me Now (2001, Columbia)
- The Sun Ain't Gonna Shine Anymore – The Best of Scott Walker and The Walker Brothers (2006, Universal Music Group) – UK #24
- Everything Under the Sun – The Complete Recordings (box set) (2006, Universal)

== Extended plays ==
Year	EP details	UK EPs
1966	I Need You: Released: June 1966; Label: Philips Records	1
1966	Solo John/Solo Scott: Released: December 1966; Label: Philips	4
1968	The Walker Brothers In Japan Vol. 2 (Japan only): Released: 1968; Label: Philips	—
1981	Shutout: Released: June 1981; Label: GTO Records	—

== Singles ==
All non-UK singles list the country of release in brackets. B-sides vary in some territories.

Year	A-side	B-side	Chart positions								Album (UK)
Year	A-side	B-side	UK	BE	CA	DE	IRL	NL	NO	US	Album (UK)
1965	"Pretty Girls Everywhere"	"Doin' the Jerk"	—	—	—	—	—	—	—	—	Non-album tracks
1965	"Love Her"	"The Seventh Dawn"	20	—	—	—	—	—	—	—	Non-album tracks
1965	"Make It Easy on Yourself"	"But I Do"	1	—	1	—	3	—	—	16	Take It Easy
1965	"My Ship Is Coming In"	"You're All Around Me"	3	—	—	—	—	—	—	63	Non-album track
1965	"Land of 1000 Dances" (DE, DK, SE, JP)	"Pretty Girls Everywhere"	—	—	—	—	—	—	—	—	Take It Easy
1966	"The Sun Ain't Gonna Shine Anymore"	"After the Lights Go Out"	1	15	2	4	5	9	6	13	Non-album tracks
1966	"(Baby) You Don't Have to Tell Me"	"My Love is Growing"	13	—	—	21	—	37	—	—	Non-album tracks
1966	"Another Tear Falls"	"Saddest Night in the World"	12	—	—	24	—	—	—	—	Non-album tracks
1966	"Saturday's Child" (GR)	"Another Tear Falls"	—	—	—	—	—	—	—	—	Portrait
1966	"Living Above Your Head" (NL)	"Young Man Cried"	—	—	—	—	—	—	—	—	Portrait
1966	"Deadlier Than the Male"	"Archangel"	32	—	—	—	—	—	—	—	Non-album track
1966	"In My Room" (JP)	"(Baby) You Don't Have to Tell Me"	—	—	—	—	—	—	—	—	Portrait
1967	"Stay with Me Baby"	"Turn Out the Moon"	26	—	—	—	—	—	—	—	Non-album tracks
1967	"Turn Out the Moon" (JP)	"Stay with Me Baby"	—	—	—	—	—	—	—	—	Non-album tracks
1967	"Experience" (NL)	"Everything Under the Sun"	—	—	—	—	—	—	—	—	Images
1967	"Walking in the Rain"	"Baby Make It the Last Time"	26	—	—	—	—	—	—	—	The Walker Brothers' Story
1967	"Everything Under the Sun" (JP)	"I Wanna Know"	—	—	—	—	—	—	—	—	Images
1967	"I Will Wait For You" (AUS)	"It Makes No Difference Now"	—	—	—	—	—	—	—	—	Images
1968	"Archangel" (JP)	"Stand By Me"	—	—	—	—	—	—	—	—	The Walker Brothers' Story
1968	"Ooh Poo Pah Doo" (Live) (JP)	"Hold On" (Live)	—	—	—	—	—	—	—	—	The Walker Brothers In Japan
1971	"Love Her" (re-issue)	"The Sun Ain't Gonna Shine Anymore", "Make It Easy on Yourself"	—	—	—	—	—	—	—	—	Non-album track
1975	"No Regrets"	"Remember Me"	7	10	—	—	5	7	—	—	No Regrets
1976	"The Sun Ain't Gonna Shine Anymore" (re-issue)	"Make It Easy on Yourself", "Stay With Me Baby"	—	—	—	—	—	—	—	—	Non-album track
1976	"Lines"	"First Day"	—	—	—	—	—	—	—	—	Lines
1976	"We're All Alone"	"Have You Seen My Baby"	—	—	—	—	—	32	—	—	Lines
1978	"The Electrician"	"Den Haague"	—	—	—	—	—	—	—	—	Nite Flights
1982	"First Love Never Dies"	"The Sun Ain't Gonna Shine Anymore"	—	—	—	—	—	—	—	—	Take It Easy
1991	"The Sun Ain't Gonna Shine Anymore" (2nd re-issue)	"Jackie" (by Scott Walker)	78	—	—	—	—	—	—	—	No Regrets: The Best of Scott Walker and the Walker Brothers 1965-1976
1991	"No Regrets" (re-issue)	"Boy Child" (by Scott Walker)	—	—	—	—	—	—	—	—	No Regrets: The Best of Scott Walker and the Walker Brothers 1965-1976
