= No Regrets – The Best of Scott Walker and The Walker Brothers 1965–1976 =

Compilation album by Scott Walker and The Walker Brothers
- Released: January 1992
- Recorded: 1964–1976
- Genres: Pop; baroque pop; blue-eyed soul; rock; country
- Length: 62:46
- Label: Fontana
- Producers: John Franz; Nick Venet

The Walker Brothers chronology
After the Lights Go Out – The Best of 1965–1967 (1990)	No Regrets – The Best of Scott Walker and The Walker Brothers 1965–1976 (1992)	If You Could Hear Me Now (2001)

Scott Walker chronology
Boy Child – The Best of 1967–1970 (1990)	No Regrets – The Best of Scott Walker and The Walker Brothers 1965–1976 (1992)	Tilt (1995)

Professional ratings
Review scores
Source	Rating
AllMusic	4.5/5 stars

No Regrets – The Best of Scott Walker and The Walker Brothers 1965–1976 is a compilation album of tracks by the American pop group The Walker Brothers and the solo career of one of their three members, Scott Walker. It was released in 1992.

== Track listing ==
All tracks performed by The Walker Brothers except those marked (*) performed by Scott Walker.

No.	Title	Writer(s)	Origin	Length
1.	"No Regrets"	Tom Rush	No Regrets, 1975	5:39
2.	"Make It Easy on Yourself"	Burt Bacharach, Hal David	Take It Easy with the Walker Brothers, 1965	3:11
3.	"The Sun Ain't Gonna Shine Anymore"	Bob Crewe, Bob Gaudio	Non-album single, 1966	3:00
4.	"My Ship Is Coming In"	Joey Brooks	Non-album single, 1965	2:54
5.	"Joanna" (*)	Tony Hatch, Jackie Trent	Non-album single, 1968	3:49
6.	"Lights of Cincinnati" (*)	Tony Macaulay, Geoff Stephens	Non-album single, 1969	3:19
7.	"Another Tear Falls"	Bacharach, David	Non-album single, 1966	2:24
8.	"Boy Child" (*)	Noel Scott Engel	Scott 4, 1969	3:34
9.	"Montague Terrace (In Blue)" (*)	Engel	Scott, 1967	3:26
10.	"Jackie" (*)	Jacques Brel, Gérard Jouannest, Mort Shuman	Scott 2, 1968	3:20
11.	"Stay with Me Baby"	Jerry Ragovoy, George David Weiss	Non-album single, 1967	3:16
12.	"If You Go Away" (*)	Brel, Rod McKuen	Scott 3, 1969	4:56
13.	"First Love Never Dies"	Bob Morris, Jim Seals	Take It Easy with the Walker Brothers	3:35
14.	"Love Her"	Barry Mann, Cynthia Weil	Non-album single, 1965	3:21
15.	"Walking in the Rain"	Mann, Phil Spector, Weil	Non-album single, 1967	3:25
16.	"(Baby) You Don't Have to Tell Me"	Pete Antell	Non-album single, 1966	2:38
17.	"Deadlier Than the Male"	Engel, John Franz	Non-album single, 1966	2:28
18.	"We're All Alone"	Boz Scaggs	Lines, 1976	4:31

== Charts ==
Chart (1992)	Peak position
UK Albums (Official Charts)	4

== Certifications ==
Region	Certification	Certified units/sales
United Kingdom (BPI)	Gold	100,000^{^}
^{^} Shipments figures based on certification alone.
