= If You Could Hear Me Now =

Compilation album by The Walker Brothers
- Released: 3 September 2001
- Recorded: 1975–1978
- Genres: Pop, country, rock, art rock
- Length: 76:57
- Label: Columbia Records
- Producers: Scott Walker, Geoff Calver, Dave MacRae

The Walker Brothers chronology
| No Regrets – The Best of Scott Walker and The Walker Brothers 1965–1976 (1992) | If You Could Hear Me Now (2001) | Everything Under The Sun – The Complete Recordings (2006) |

Professional ratings
Review scores
| Source | Rating |
|---|---|
| Allmusic | 3/5 stars |

If You Could Hear Me Now is a compilation album by the American pop group The Walker Brothers. It was released in 2001. The album compiles material by the group from their 1970s reunion albums; No Regrets, Lines and Nite Flights. The compilation includes seven previously unreleased outtakes from these albums. All of these seven tracks were later included on the expansive Walker Brothers box set Everything Under the Sun – The Complete Recordings in 2006.

Of the new material the original John Walker composition "The Ballad" and Scott Walker's unfinished disco-infused instrumental "Tokyo Rimshot", both from the Nite Flights sessions, are the most notable.

== Track listing ==
| No. | Title | Writer(s) | Length |
|---|---|---|---|
| 1. | "No Regrets" | Tom Rush | 5:47 |
| 2. | "Lover's Lullaby" | Janis Ian | 3:52 |
| 3. | "I've Got To Have You" | Kris Kristofferson | 3:55 |
| 4. | "Loving Arms" (Previously unreleased No Regrets outtake) | Thomas Jans | 3:36 |
| 5. | "I Never Dreamed You'd Leave In Summer" (Previously unreleased No Regrets outtake) | Stevie Wonder | 3:13 |
| 6. | "The Moon's A Harsh Mistress" (Previously unreleased No Regrets outtake) | Jimmy Webb | 3:00 |
| 7. | "Marie" (Previously unreleased No Regrets outtake) | Randy Newman | 3:43 |
| 8. | "Lines" | Jerry Fuller | 3:26 |
| 9. | "Inside of You" | Tom Jans | 3:35 |
| 10. | "We're All Alone" | Boz Scaggs | 4:35 |
| 11. | "Brand New Tennessee Waltz" | Jesse Winchester | 3:11 |
| 12. | "Dreaming As One" | David Palmer, William Smith | 3:03 |
| 13. | "Til I Gain Control Again" (Previously unreleased Lines outtake) | Rodney Crowell | 5:02 |
| 14. | "The Ballad" (Previously unreleased Nite Flights outtake) | John Walker | 4:06 |
| 15. | "Shutout" | Scott Engel | 2:46 |
| 16. | "Fat Mama Kick" | Scott Engel | 2:57 |
| 17. | "Nite Flights" | Scott Engel | 4:25 |
| 18. | "The Electrician" | Scott Engel | 6:10 |
| 19. | "Death of Romance" | Gary Leeds | 3:44 |
| 20. | "Tokyo Rimshot" (Previously unreleased Nite Flights outtake) | Scott Walker | 3:40 |
