= The Walker Brothers' Story =

Compilation album by The Walker Brothers
- Released: September 1967
- Recorded: 1965–1967
- Genre: Pop, baroque pop, blue-eyed soul
- Length: 75:26 (UK version)
- Label: Philips Records
- Producer: John Franz

The Walker Brothers chronology
Images (1967)	The Walker Brothers' Story (1967)	No Regrets (1975)

The Walker Brothers' Story is a compilation album by the American pop group The Walker Brothers. It was released in soon after the group's dissolution in the mid-1967 and reached number nine on the UK Albums Chart.

Unusually for a greatest hits compilation, the album does not include all of the group's major hits. The group's breakthrough single "Love Her" is notably absent. The UK and German editions of the album have differing track listings.

== Track listing ==
=== UK version ===
Side one
No.	Title	Writer(s)	Length
1.	"Make It Easy on Yourself"	Burt Bacharach, Hal David	3:14
2.	"Land of a 1,000 Dances"	Chris Kenner	2:35
3.	"Young Man Cried"	Scott Engel, John Franz	2:33
4.	"Living Above Your Head"	Kenny Vance, Mark D. Sanders, J.A. Black	2:44
5.	"I Need You"	Carole King, Gerry Goffin	3:10
6.	"My Ship Is Coming In"	Joey Brooks	3:15

Side two
No.	Title	Writer(s)	Length
7.	"Saturday's Child"	Scott Engel	2:07
8.	"Mrs. Murphy"	Scott Engel	3:20
9.	"The Sun Ain't Gonna Shine (Anymore)"	Bob Crewe, Bob Gaudio	3:17
10.	"I Can See It Now"	Scott Engel, John Franz	3:00
11.	"Just for a Thrill"	Lil Armstrong, Don Raye	3:36
12.	"Summertime"	George Gershwin, Ira Gershwin, Dubose Heyward	4:31

Side three
No.	Title	Writer(s)	Length
13.	"In My Room"	Joaquin Prieto, Paul Vance and Lee Pockriss (English lyrics)	2:34
14.	"Stand by Me"	Ben E. King, Jerry Leiber, Mike Stoller	3:27
15.	"Once Upon a Summertime"	Michel Legrand, Johnny Mercer, Eddy Marnay	3:49
16.	"Experience"	Scott Engel	2:53
17.	"Come Rain or Come Shine"	Harold Arlen, Johnny Mercer	3:21
18.	"Archangel"	Scott Engel	3:45

Side four
No.	Title	Writer(s)	Length
19.	"People Get Ready"	Curtis Mayfield	2:40
20.	"Stay With Me Baby"	Jerry Ragovoy, George David Weiss	3:22
21.	"Genevieve"	Scott Engel	2:49
22.	"Walking in the Rain"	Barry Mann, Phil Spector, Cynthia Weil	3:23
23.	"I Wanna Know"	John Maus	2:28
24.	"Just Say Goodbye"	Petula Clark, Pierre Delanoé, Alvin Hatch	3:33

=== German version ===
Side one

1. "The Sun Ain't Gonna Shine Anymore"
2. "Land of a 1,000 Dances"
3. "Love Minus Zero"
4. "Living Above Your Head"
5. "I Need You"
6. "My Ship Is Coming In"

Side two

1. "Saturday's Child"
2. "Make It Easy on Yourself"
3. "Dancing in the Street"
4. "I Can See It Now"
5. "Tell The Truth"
6. "Summertime"

Side three

1. "In My Room"
2. "Stand by Me"
3. "Once Upon A Summertime"
4. "Lonely Winds"
5. "Come Rain or Come Shine"
6. "Archangel"

Side four

1. "People Get Ready"
2. "Stay With Me Baby"
3. "Take It Like A Man"
4. "No Sad Songs For Me"
5. "Hurting Each Other"
6. "Just Say Goodbye"
