= The Sun Ain't Gonna Shine Anymore (album) =

Studio album by The Walker Brothers
- Released: August 1966
- Recorded: 1966
- Studio: Philips (London)
- Genre: Pop, baroque pop, blue-eyed soul
- Length: 34:02
- Label: Smash
- Producer: John Franz

The Walker Brothers chronology
Portrait (1966)	The Sun Ain't Gonna Shine Anymore (1966)	Images (1967)

Singles from The Sun Ain't Gonna Shine Anymore
- 1. "The Sun Ain't Gonna Shine (Anymore)" Released: March 1966; 2. "(Baby) You Don't Have to Tell Me" Released: July 1966

The Sun Ain't Gonna Shine Anymore is the second North-American album release by the Walker Brothers. Released in 1966, the album was the group's fourth overall.

Portrait was not released in the United States or Canada. In its place Smash Records compiled The Sun Ain't Gonna Shine Anymore as the group's second American album. This alternate album shifted around the running order even more so than Introducing the Walker Brothers altered the group's début and substituted the majority of the album's tracks, leaving only "Just For a Thrill", "Old Folks", "People Get Ready" and "Take It Like a Man". The rest of the album was filled out with A-sides, B-sides and tracks from their first EP, I Need You. The final track, "Don't Fight It", was never released anywhere else.

== Reception ==
The Sun Ain't Gonna Shine Anymore received good to mixed reviews from the majority of critics.

=== Legacy ===
Richie Unterberger, in a retrospective review for AllMusic, feels that it is "a haphazard assortment" of "a few of their better songs" but mostly "their lesser recordings", which he feels "makes this LP of limited interest".

Though it was never released as a single, Steve Harley played the song as a mark of respect for Scott Walker, who had died as Harley was performing his 2019 3-man acoustic tour of the UK from March 27, 2019 (the Worthing Pier Pavilion show) onwards, continuing Harley's habit of including a song from an artist who has died recently whom he has great respect for in his shows.

== Track listing ==
Side one
No.	Title	Writer(s)	Length
1.	"The Sun Ain't Gonna Shine (Anymore)"	Bob Crewe, Bob Gaudio	3:17
2.	"After the Lights Go Out"	John Stewart	4:01
3.	"People Get Ready"	Curtis Mayfield	2:40
4.	"Everything's Gonna Be Alright"	Willie Mitchell	2:16
5.	"Old Folks"	Willard Robison, Dedette Lee Hill	3:13
6.	"Take It Like a Man"	Jerry Leiber, Mike Stoller	2:31

Side two
No.	Title	Writer(s)	Length
7.	"(Baby) You Don't Have to Tell Me"	Peter Antell	2:28
8.	"I Need You"	Carole King, Gerry Goffin	3:10
9.	"My Love Is Growing"	John Stewart, Robbie van Leeuwen	2:22
10.	"Young Man Cried"	Scott Engel, John Franz	2:33
11.	"Just for a Thrill"	Lil Armstrong, Don Raye	3:36
12.	"Don't Fight It"	Steve Cropper, Wilson Pickett	1:55

== Personnel ==
The Walker Brothers

- Gary Walker – drums, vocals
- John Walker – guitar, vocals
- Scott Walker – vocals, guitar, keyboards

with:

- Ivor Raymonde – music director
