= Portrait (The Walker Brothers album) =

Studio album by The Walker Brothers
- Released: August 26, 1966
- Recorded: 1966
- Genres: Pop, baroque pop, blue-eyed soul
- Length: 33:54; 1:10:15 (Expanded CD)
- Labels: Philips, Smash
- Producer: John Franz

The Walker Brothers chronology
Take It Easy with the Walker Brothers (1965)	Portrait (1966)	The Sun Ain't Gonna Shine Anymore (1966)

Singles from Portrait
- 1. "Saturday's Child" Released: 1966; 2. "In My Room" Released: December 1966

Portrait is the second album by the American pop group The Walker Brothers. Released in 1966, the album was their most successful and reached number three on the UK Albums Chart. The group's musical accompaniment was directed by Ivor Raymonde and Reg Guest and produced by John Franz. Receiving good to mixed reviews, the album was first released in both mono and stereo LP formats in August 1966. The album was later released on CD having been remastered and expanded in 1998. The sleeve notes were written by Keith Altham with photography by Dezo Hoffmann.

Portrait was not released in the USA. In its place Smash Records compiled The Sun Ain't Gonna Shine Anymore as the group's second album. This alternate version substituted the majority of the album's tracks with A-sides, B-sides and tracks from their first EP, leaving only "Just For A Thrill", "Old Folks", "People Get Ready" and "Take It Like a Man".

== Reception ==
Portrait received mixed to good reviews from the majority of critics.

=== Legacy ===
Richie Unterberger writing for AllMusic recommends the album for serious fans only, as the majority of the best tracks are on the compilation After the Lights Go Out. "Like some other pop/rock LPs of its time, it suffered from an apparent strategy to appeal to a wider demographic than those that typically bought pop/rock records, adding a cover of Louis Armstrong's 'Just for a Thrill,' the moldy standard 'Old Folks,' and the pedestrian white-boy soul workout on Curtis Mayfield's 'People Get Ready.'" Unterberger is also positive regarding "In My Room", which he describes as "dramatic", and "No Sad Songs for Me", which he calls "melodramatic" and "the best tune that doesn't show up on the After the Lights Go Out compilation".

== Track listing ==
Side one
No.	Title	Writer(s)	Length
1.	"In My Room"	Joaquin Prieto; Paul Vance and Lee Pockriss (English lyrics)	2:34
2.	"Saturday's Child"	Scott Engel	2:07
3.	"Just for a Thrill"	Lil Armstrong, Don Raye	3:36
4.	"Hurting Each Other"	Peter Udell, Gary Geld	2:47
5.	"Old Folks"	Willard Robison, Dedette Lee Hill	3:13
6.	"Summertime"	George Gershwin, Ira Gershwin, Dubose Heyward	4:31

Side two
No.	Title	Writer(s)	Length
7.	"People Get Ready"	Curtis Mayfield	2:40
8.	"I Can See It Now"	Scott Engel, John Franz	3:00
9.	"Where's the Girl"	Jerry Leiber, Mike Stoller	3:14
10.	"Living Above Your Head"	Kenny Vance, Marty Sanders, Jay Black	2:44
11.	"Take It Like a Man"	Jerry Leiber, Mike Stoller	2:31
12.	"No Sad Songs for Me"	Tom Springfield	3:41

Expanded CD bonus tracks
No.	Title	Writer(s)	Length
13.	"The Sun Ain't Gonna Shine Anymore" (1966 A-side)	Bob Crewe, Bob Gaudio	3:17
14.	"After the Lights Go Out" (B-side of "The Sun Ain't Gonna Shine Anymore")	John Stewart	4:01
15.	"(Baby) You Don't Have to Tell Me" (1966 A-side)	Peter Antell	2:28
16.	"My Love Is Growing" (B-side of "(Baby) You Don't Have to Tell Me")	John Stewart, Robbie van Leeuwen	2:22
17.	"Another Tear Falls" (1966 A-side)	Burt Bacharach, Hal David	2:28
18.	"Saddest Night in the World" (B-side of "Another Tear Falls")	John Maus	2:13
19.	"Deadlier Than the Male" (1966 A-side)	Scott Engel, John Franz	2:32
20.	"Archangel" (B-side of "Deadlier Than the Male")	Scott Engel	3:45
21.	"Sunny" (from 1966 EP: Solo John/Solo Scott)	Bobby Hebb	3:50
22.	"Come Rain or Come Shine" (from 1966 EP: Solo John/Solo Scott)	Harold Arlen, Johnny Mercer	3:21
23.	"The Gentle Rain" (from 1966 EP: Solo John/Solo Scott)	Luiz Bonfá, Matt Dubey	2:44
24.	"Mrs. Murphy" (from 1966 EP: Solo John/Solo Scott)	Scott Engel	3:20

== Personnel ==
The Walker Brothers

- Gary Walker – drums, vocals
- John Walker – guitar, vocals
- Scott Walker – vocals, guitar, keyboards

with:

- Reg Guest – music director
- Ivor Raymonde – music director (4, 9, 11, 13, 14)
- Dezo Hoffmann – photography

== Charts ==
Weekly chart performance for Portrait
Chart (1966–1967)	Peak position
UK Disc and Music Echo Top Ten LPs	3
UK Melody Maker Top Ten LPs	3
UK New Musical Express Best Selling LPs in Britain	3
UK Record Retailer LPs Chart	3
West German Media Control Albums Chart	8
