= The Electrician (song) =

Single by The Walker Brothers

from the album Nite Flights
- B-side: "Den Haague"
- Released: July 1978
- Recorded: February 1978
- Studio: Scorpio Sound, London
- Genre: Art rock
- Length: 3:32 (7"); 6:10 (album version)
- Label: GTO Records
- Songwriter: Scott Engel
- Producers: Scott Walker, Dave MacRae

The Walker Brothers singles chronology
"We're All Alone" (1977)	"The Electrician" (1978)	"First Love Never Dies" (1982)

"The Electrician" is a song written by American singer-songwriter Scott Walker. The song was first recorded and released by Walker's pop group The Walker Brothers as their fourteenth UK single and last official release while the group were still active in 1978. The single did not chart. The song describes the work of a CIA torturer.

Midge Ure is said to have been influenced by "The Electrician" when composing "Vienna" for Ultravox.

"The Electrician" was featured as the opening track for the 2008 crime film Bronson directed by Nicolas Winding Refn. In 2019, the song was featured in Episode 4 of On Becoming a God in Central Florida, Season 1.

The song was covered by Laurie Anderson for the Scott Walker tribute album Scott Walker: 30 Century Man in 2009.

== Track listing ==
GTO Records – GT 230
No.	Title	Writer(s)	Length
1.	"The Electrician"	S. Engel	3:32
2.	"Den Haague"	G. Leeds	4:03

== Personnel ==
"The Electrician"

- John Walker and Scott Walker – vocals
- Frank Gibson – drums
- Dill Katz – bass
- Morris Pert – percussion
- Jim Sullivan – guitar

"Den Haague"

- Gary Walker – vocals
- Scott Walker and Dave MacRae – keyboards
- Peter Van Hooke – drums
- Mo Foster and Scott Walker – bass
- Gary Walker – percussion
- Dennis Weinreich – background vocals

Technical and visual

- The Walker Brothers – arrangements
- Dave MacRae – orchestrations and conductor
- Scott Walker and Dave MacRae – producer
- Dennis Weinreich – recording
- Scott Walker, Dave MacRae and Dennis Weinreich – mixing
- Hipgnosis and The Walker Brothers – sleeve design
