= The Female of the Species =

The Female of the Species or Deadlier Than the Male may refer to:

== Literature ==
- "The Female of the Species" (poem), by Rudyard Kipling, first published in 1911
- The Female of the Species (novel), a 1928 novel by H. C. McNeile
- The Female of the Species, a 1987 novel by Lionel Shriver
- The Female of the Species: Tales of Mystery and Suspense, a 2006 anthology edited by Joyce Carol Oates
- The Female of the Species (play), a comic play Joanna Murray-Smith first performed in 2006
- "The Female of the Species is More Deadly Than the Male" is also the title of Issue #38 of the comic series The Boys
- Deadlier Than the Male (novel), by James Gunn, 1942

== Film ==
- The Female of the Species (film), a 1912 short film
- Deadlier Than the Male, a 1967 British crime and mystery film
- Deadlier Than the Male (1956 film), a French crime film

== Television ==
- "The Female of the Species", a 2015 episode of Elementary
- The Female of the Species (The Boys), character in The Boys
  - "The Female of the Species" (The Boys episode), 2019
- "Deadlier Than the Male", a 2005 episode of Ultimate Force

== Music ==
- "Female of the Species", a 1996 song by Space
- "Deadlier Than the Male" (song), by The Walker Brothers, 1966
