= Nite Flights (album) =

1978 album by The Walker Brothers

Studio album by The Walker Brothers
- Released: July 1978
- Recorded: February 1978
- Studios: Scorpio Sound, London
- Genres: Art pop; new wave; avant-pop
- Length: 38:00
- Label: GTO
- Producers: Scott Walker; Dave MacRae

The Walker Brothers chronology
Lines (1976)	Nite Flights (1978)	No Regrets – The Best of Scott Walker and The Walker Brothers 1965–1976 (1992)

Scott Walker chronology
Lines (1976)	Nite Flights (1978)	Climate of Hunter (1984)

Singles from Nite Flights
- 1. "The Electrician" Released: July 1978

Nite Flights is the sixth and final studio album by American pop group the Walker Brothers, released in July 1978 by GTO Records. In contrast to their previous two albums, which were made up almost entirely of cover versions, Nite Flights is the group's only album to feature entirely original songs; Gary Walker contributed two while Scott Walker and John Walker each contributed four. In addition to containing all original material, the album was a radical departure from the group's usual mainstream sound, displaying elements of art rock, new wave and experimental music. It is generally considered an artistic breakthrough for Scott Walker, presaging his later re-emergence as an avant-garde artist.

"The Electrician" was released as a single from the album, while the four Scott-penned tracks were released as an EP titled Shutout. The album itself was virtually ignored by critics and audiences upon release, while the Walker Brothers' disinterest in touring and the financial decline of GTO led to the group losing their record contract and disbanding at the end of 1978. In subsequent years, critical re-evaluation of the Walker Brothers, and Scott Walker in particular, led to retrospective opinions on Nite Flights being more positive.

== Recording ==
After reforming in 1974, the Walker Brothers released two albums, No Regrets and Lines, both of which were commercial failures. With enough money from the label to make one more record, the trio spent all of 1977 writing songs before returning to the studio. Scott Walker, who had not written a song since his 1970 solo album 'Til the Band Comes In, began writing again after hearing Joni Mitchell, soon after finding other influences: "It's an inspiration to learn that Henry Miller didn't write Tropic of Cancer until he was 33."

The album was recorded in February 1978 at Scorpio Sound in London. Scott brought David Bowie's 1977 album "Heroes" to the studio, where it was, according to engineer Steve Parker, used as "the reference album when we were making Nite Flights".

Author Chris O'Leary describes "The Electrician" as more experimental than Bowie and Brian Eno's work on "Heroes", stating there was "nothing of its like" at the time.

== Content ==
Nite Flights was the last album the trio recorded as a group, although the structure of the album, effectively split into three sections in which each member writes and sings, has led to both critics and band members describing it as more akin to three miniature solo albums than a true group album.

The album is most notable for the first four songs, all written and sung by Scott Walker. These were his first original songs since his 1970 solo album 'Til the Band Comes In, all of them notably darker in tone than the rest of the album, indicating the direction in which his later solo work would head.

"The Electrician" is described by O'Leary as "a love song about American complicity in Central American torture regimes".

The artwork was designed by Hipgnosis.

== Release ==
Nite Flights was released in July 1978, through record label GTO. "The Electrician" was released as a single but, like the album, failed to chart. In 1981, Scott Walker's four songs were released as an EP titled Shutout under the Walker Brothers name.

Nite Flights was long out of print until the mid-1990s when it was re-released as a budget CD. In 2001, two outtakes from the Nite Flights sessions surfaced on the compilation album If You Could Hear Me Now. "The Ballad" written by John Walker is a complete song, the second outtake, "Tokyo Rimshot" is an unfinished instrumental written by Scott Walker.

== Reception ==
Professional ratings
Review scores
Source	Rating
AllMusic	3.5/5 stars
Trouser Press	favorable

In a 2008 retrospective for Uncut magazine, Chris Roberts called the album "extraordinary", commending the seamlessness of the brothers' styles and notes that, with the first four tracks alone, Nite Flights "is one of the most important works of its time", influencing the likes of Radiohead, Pulp, and Japan. In a retrospective review for AllMusic, Dave Thompson wrote, "Every once in a while, an album comes along that doesn't simply surprise you, it takes you down an alleyway, rips off all your clothes, then hares away with your socks on its head, singing selections from South Pacific."

== Legacy ==
Nite Flights was the Walkers Brothers' final album; the band split soon after its release. Roberts partially attributed the album's commercial failure to the time of its release, when punk rock was the dominant genre. Nevertheless, the experimental style of Scott's tracks on Nite Flights laid the stylistic groundwork for his later solo career. Scott would not release another album until 1984's Climate of Hunter.

David Bowie listened to Nite Flights when making his 1979 album Lodger. Bowie biographer Nicholas Pegg attributed "Nite Flights" as an influence on the title of Lodger's "African Night Flight". He later covered "Nite Flights" in 1993 for his album Black Tie White Noise. Bowie recalled, "Scott sent me Nite Flights. I think he'd been very influenced by Low and "Heroes", which [Eno and I] just finished. I have deep admiration for him, it was as a tribute that I did a version of 'Nite Flights' on Black Tie White Noise." Bowie later used "The Electrician" as a basis for "The Motel" from his 1995 album Outside.

Midge Ure claimed that "The Electrician" inspired him to write Ultravox's "Vienna".

== Track listing ==
Side one
No.	Title	Writer(s)	Length
1.	"Shutout"	Scott Engel	2:46
2.	"Fat Mama Kick"	Scott Engel	2:57
3.	"Nite Flights"	Scott Engel	4:25
4.	"The Electrician"	Scott Engel	6:10
5.	"Death of Romance"	Gary Leeds	3:44

Side two
No.	Title	Writer(s)	Length
6.	"Den Haague"	Gary Leeds	4:03
7.	"Rhythms of Vision"	John Maus	2:55
8.	"Disciples of Death"	John Maus	3:49
9.	"Fury and the Fire"	John Maus	3:58
10.	"Child of Flames"	John Maus	3:14

== Personnel ==
According to the album's liner notes.

The Walker Brothers

- Scott Walker – vocals, bass, keyboards, production, mixing, sleeve design, photography
- Gary Walker – vocals, percussion, sleeve design, photography
- John Walker – vocals, sleeve design, photography

Additional personnel

- Ronnie Ross – soprano saxophone
- Alan Skidmore – tenor saxophone
- Chris Mercer – saxophone
- Jim Sullivan – rhythm guitar
- Les Davidson – guitar
- Frank Gibson, Jr. – drums
- Peter Van Hooke – drums
- Mo Foster – bass
- Dill Katz – bass
- Dave MacRae – keyboards, orchestrations and conducting, production, mixing
- Morris Pert – percussion
- Joy Yates and Katie Kissoon – backing vocals
- Dennis Weinreich – backing vocals, mixing, recording
- Steve Parker – assistant engineering
- Hipgnosis – sleeve design, photography

== Release details ==
Country	Date	Label	Format	Catalog
United Kingdom	1978	GTO Records	Vinyl	GTLP 033
United Kingdom	1996	Columbia Records	CD	484438 2
Netherlands	1978	GTO Records	Vinyl	2321 133
Worldwide	2026	GTO Records/Sony Music	Vinyl	19958410851
