= The Female =

The Female may refer to:

- The Female (1924 film), a 1924 American silent film directed by Sam Wood
- The Female (1959 film), a 1959 French-Italian drama film directed by Julien Duvivier

== See also ==
- Female (disambiguation)
- The Female of the Species (disambiguation)
