= Solo John/Solo Scott =

EP by John Walker/Scott Walker
- Released: 2 December 1966
- Recorded: 1966
- Genres: Pop, baroque pop, blue-eyed soul
- Length: 13:15
- Label: Philips
- Producer: John Franz

The Walker Brothers chronology
Another Tear Falls (1966)	Solo John/Solo Scott (1966)	Deadlier Than the Male (1966)

Rear sleeve

Solo John/Solo Scott is a split EP by John Walker and Scott Walker, members of the American pop group The Walker Brothers. It was released in 1966 and reached number four on the UK EP Chart.

The EP was produced by John Franz with musical accompaniment directed by Reg Guest. It includes the original Scott Walker composition "Mrs. Murphy". All four tracks have since been re-released on the expanded edition of The Walker Brothers' second album, Portrait.

== Track listing ==
Philips - BE 12597

Side one (Solo John)
No.	Title	Writer(s)	Length
1.	"Sunny"	Bobby Hebb	3:50
2.	"Come Rain or Come Shine"	Harold Arlen, Johnny Mercer	3:21

Side two (Solo Scott)
No.	Title	Writer(s)	Length
3.	"The Gentle Rain"	Luiz Bonfá, Matt Dubey	2:44
4.	"Mrs. Murphy"	Scott Engel	3:20

== Personnel ==
- John Walker – vocals ("Sunny" and "Come Rain or Come Shine")
- Scott Walker – vocals ("The Gentle Rain" and "Mrs. Murphy")
- John Franz – producer
- Reg Guest – accompaniment direction

== Chart positions ==
Chart (1966)	Peak position
UK EP chart	4
