= The Female of the Species (poem) =

Poem by Rudyard Kipling

- by Rudyard Kipling
- First published in: The Morning Post
- Country: Britain
- Publication date: 1911

"The Female of the Species" is a poem by Rudyard Kipling originally published in 1911 in The Morning Post. Its title and refrain ("The female of the species is more deadly than the male") have inspired the titles of numerous subsequent works.

== Summary ==
Kipling begins the poem by illustrating the greater deadliness of female bears and cobras compared to their male counterparts, and by stating that early Jesuit missionaries to North America were more frightened of Native women than male warriors.

He writes that women take their purpose from the care and protection of their offspring:

She who faces Death by torture
for each life beneath her breast
May not deal in doubt or pity—
must not swerve for fact or jest.
These be purely male diversions—
not in these her honour dwells.
She the Other Law we live by,
is that Law and nothing else.

She can bring no more to living than
the powers that make her great
As the Mother of the Infant and the
Mistress of the Mate.
And when Babe and Man are lacking and
she strides unclaimed to claim
Her right as femme (and baron),
her equipment is the same.

He repeats the refrain "The female of the species is more deadly than the male" at the end of each of the first four stanzas, and returns to it in the seventh stanza in modified form as "The female of the species must be deadlier than the male." At the end of the poem, the narrator asserts that "Woman" knows intuitively, and indeed warns "Man", "That the Female of Her Species is more deadly than the Male."

== Critical reception ==
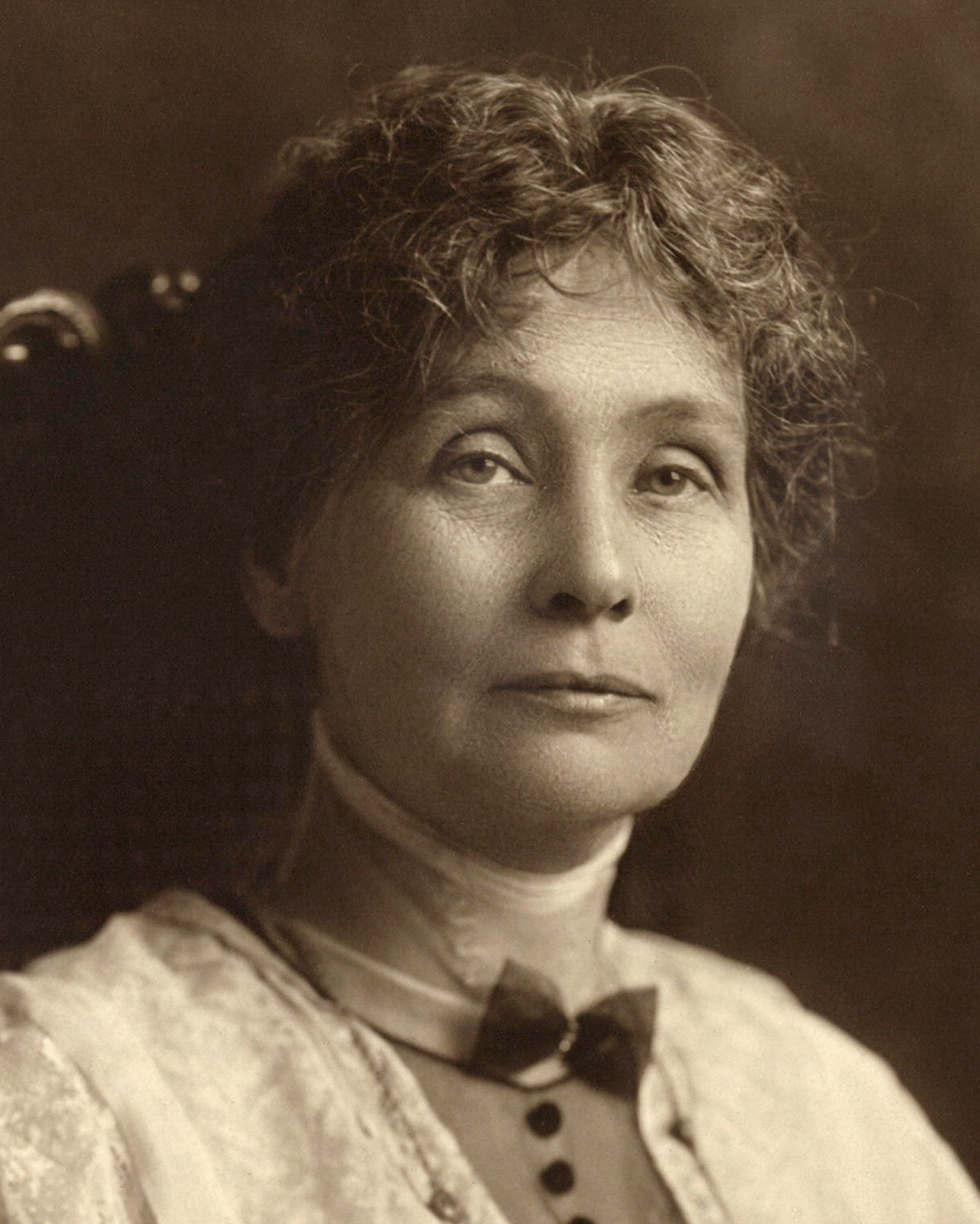
Suffragette Emmeline Pankhurst

The poem has provoked controversy, asserting the proclaimed moral strength and single-mindedness of women, compared to men who are posited as being weak, whilst portraying a fear of and hostility towards female militancy. It was written in the context of militant action by the British suffragette movement, led by Emmeline Pankhurst. An anti-suffrage polemic, Carrie Kipling referred to it as "suffragette verses." Kipling believed female suffrage would weaken the British Empire, writing to Canadian writer Andrew McPhail that women would “ruin their reproductive system by standing on their feet for hours and working”.

In 1919, Kipling wrote to his publisher Frank Nelson Doubleday that the poem was “likely to provoke some discussion, but based on the facts of human nature." British writer Gilbert Frankau saw it as portraying “the essential fierceness of women” whilst accusing Kipling of being "antediluvian on the subject of women" and stating that he was born "in the pre-woman age." Peter Keating observed the contradictions of Kipling’s attitude to women; he described Kipling "a romantic individualist" who "abhorred any restriction on individual rights…but seems never to have believed that universal suffrage was necessary or particularly desirable." Kipling biographer Charles Carrington noted Kipling’s "devotion to his mother and wife" and wrote that he was "no scorner of female intelligence."

== References in other media ==
"The Female of the Species" and its refrain have been referenced in numerous other works:

- In 1928, the Bulldog Drummond story The Female of the Species may have lifted the title. This story was adapted as the 1967 European spy movie Deadlier Than the Male. Scott Walker of The Walker Brothers wrote and performed the accompanying musical theme and scored a minor hit on the UK Singles Chart in 1966.
- A 1946 novel by James Hadley Chase was titled More Deadly Than The Male. Another novel, written by Mindy McGinnis, is titled The Female of the Species.
- In 1984, Off Centaur Publications released an audio tape cassette album titled The Horse-Tamer's Daughter, which featured a song based on the poem set to music by Leslie Fish and performed by Julia Ecklar. In 1998, the song was nominated for a Pegasus Award for "Best Adaptation" by a ballot of science fiction and fantasy fans, conducted by the committee of the annual Ohio Valley Filk Fest (OVFF), a filk music convention.
- It is referenced by the character of Col. Mustard, played by Martin Mull, in the 1985 film Clue.
- It seems to be referred to by the abbreviated form "The F of the S is much more D than the M" in episode 3 of series 1 of the TV series Jeeves and Wooster.
- In 1996, the English pop group Space released "Female of the Species".
- The title was lifted in 2006 for Joanna Murray-Smith's satirical play The Female of the Species.
- The title of the poem is also used as the name of a character in Garth Ennis' 2006 comic book The Boys. As a possible other reference to Kipling's work, the character is depicted as a feral child .
- The title of this poem is used as the title of season 3 episode 14 of the TV show Elementary.
