= Take It Easy with the Walker Brothers =

Studio album by the Walker Brothers
- Released: November 26, 1965
- Recorded: 1964–1965
- Genre: Pop, baroque pop, blue-eyed soul
- Length: 34:36; 57:00 (Expanded CD)
- Label: Philips, Smash
- Producer: John Franz, Nick Venet

The Walker Brothers chronology
Take It Easy with the Walker Brothers (1965)	Portrait (1966)

Singles from Take It Easy with The Walker Brothers
- 1. "Pretty Girls Everywhere" Released: February 26, 1965; 2. "Love Her" Released: April 9, 1965; 3. "Make It Easy on Yourself" Released: August 1965; 4. "Land of 1000 Dances" Released: January 1966

Introducing the Walker Brothers
- Smash Records (US) sleeve

Take It Easy with the Walker Brothers is the debut album by the American pop group the Walker Brothers. It is also commonly known as Take It Easy. The group's musical accompaniment was directed by Ivor Raymonde and produced by John Franz and Nick Venet. It was released in 1965 and reached number three on the UK Albums Chart. The album contains the group's first major hit single "Make It Easy on Yourself". Receiving good to mixed reviews, the album was released in both Mono and Stereo LP formats in November 1965. The album was later released on CD having been remastered and expanded in 1998. The sleeve notes were written by Brian Mulligan, the then press officer for Philips Records, with photography by Terence Donovan.

== Introducing the Walker Brothers ==
In the USA the album was released on Smash Records as Introducing the Walker Brothers in December 1965. This alternate version shifted the running order around and replaced "Lonely Winds", "Girl I Lost in the Rain", "First Love Never Dies", and "Tell the Truth" with the singles "Love Her", "My Ship Is Coming In" and "Pretty Girls Everywhere", along with the last's B-side "Doin' the Jerk". The group can be seen miming "Doin' the Jerk" on the 1965 beach party movie Beach Ball.

Introducing the Walker Brothers is now out of print. In 2008 Water Records released the Philips Take It Easy track listing in the US for the first time.

== Reception ==
Professional ratings
Review scores
Source	Rating
AllMusic	4.5/5 stars

Take It Easy with the Walker Brothers received good to mixed reviews from the majority of critics. Richie Unterberger writing retrospectively for Allmusic described the US version Introducing the Walker Brothers as "an erratic affair" that features "their trademark balladeering groove with the hits "Make It Easy On Yourself" and "My Ship Is Comin' In," but [sounding] stiff on uptempo R&B numbers like "Land of 1,000 Dances" and "Dancing in the Street"."

== Track listing ==
=== Take It Easy with the Walker Brothers (UK, Philips Records) ===
Side one
No.	Title	Writer(s)	Length
1.	"Make It Easy on Yourself"	Burt Bacharach, Hal David	3:14
2.	"There Goes My Baby"	George Treadwell, Lover Patterson, Benjamin Nelson	3:08
3.	"First Love Never Dies"	Bob Morris, Jim Seals	3:37
4.	"Dancing in the Street"	Marvin Gaye, Ivy Hunter, William "Mickey" Stevenson	3:50
5.	"Lonely Winds"	Mort Shuman, Doc Pomus	2:37
6.	"Girl I Lost in the Rain"	David Gates	2:48

Side two
No.	Title	Writer(s)	Length
7.	"Land of a 1,000 Dances"	Chris Kenner	2:35
8.	"You're All Around Me"	Scott Engel, Lesley Duncan	2:39
9.	"Love Minus Zero/No Limit"	Bob Dylan	3:05
10.	"I Don't Want to Hear It Anymore"	Randy Newman	3:48
11.	"Here Comes the Night"	Mort Shuman, Doc Pomus	2:27
12.	"Tell the Truth"	Lowman Pauling	1:51

Expanded CD bonus tracks
No.	Title	Writer(s)	Length
13.	"Love Her" (1965 A-Side)	Barry Mann, Cynthia Weil	3:23
14.	"The Seventh Dawn" (B-Side of "Love Her")	Riz Ortolani	2:40
15.	"But I Do" (B-Side of "Make It Easy on Yourself")	Paul Gayten, Robert Guidry	2:56
16.	"My Ship Is Coming In" (1965 A-Side)	Joey Brooks	3:15
17.	"Looking for Me" (from 1966 EP: I Need You)	Randy Newman	2:11
18.	"Young Man Cried" (from 1966 EP: I Need You)	Scott Engel, John Franz	2:33
19.	"Everything's Gonna Be Alright" (from 1966 EP: I Need You)	Willie Mitchell	2:16
20.	"I Need You" (from 1966 EP: I Need You)	Carole King, Gerry Goffin	3:10

=== Introducing the Walker Brothers (US,Smash Records) ===
Side one
No.	Title	Writer(s)	Length
1.	"My Ship Is Coming In"	Joey Brooks	3:15
2.	"Doin' the Jerk"	Scott Engel	2:25
3.	"Love Her"	Barry Mann, Cynthia Weil	3:23
4.	"Dancing in the Street"	Marvin Gaye, Ivy Hunter, William "Mickey" Stevenson	3:50
5.	"I Don't Want to Hear It Any More"	Randy Newman	3:48
6.	"Love Minus Zero"	Bob Dylan	3:05

Side two
No.	Title	Writer(s)	Length
7.	"Make It Easy on Yourself"	Burt Bacharach, Hal David	3:14
8.	"Land of a 1,000 Dances"	Chris Kenner	2:35
9.	"There Goes My Baby"	George Treadwell, Lover Patterson, Benjamin Nelson	3:08
10.	"Pretty Girls Everywhere"	Eugene Church, Thomas Williams	2:30
11.	"Here Comes the Night"	Mort Shuman, Doc Pomus	2:27
12.	"You're All Around Me"	Scott Engel, Lesley Duncan	2:39

== Personnel ==
The Walker Brothers

- Gary Walker – drums, vocals
- John Walker – guitar, vocals
- Scott Walker – vocals, guitar, keyboards

with:

- The Quotations – accompaniment on "Everything's Gonna Be Alright"
- Jack Nitzsche – arranger and conductor on "Love Her" and The Seventh Dawn"
- Ivor Raymonde – music director
- Reg Guest – music director on "Young Man Cried" and "I Need You"
- John Franz – producer
- Nick Venet – producer on "Pretty Girls Everywhere", "Doin the Jerk", "Love Her", and "The Seventh Dawn"
- Terence Donovan – photography

== Charts ==
Weekly chart performance for Take It Easy with the Walker Brothers
Chart (1965–66)	Peak position
UK Disc and Music Echo Top Ten LPs	4
UK Melody Maker Top Ten LPs	3
UK New Musical Express Best Selling LPs in Britain	3
UK Record Retailer LPs Chart	3
West German Media Control Albums Chart	7
