= Peter Brace =

British film actor and stunt performer (1924–2018)

Peter Brace (né Hurman; 30 August 1924 – 25 October 2018) was a British film actor and stunt performer who worked alongside actors like Sean Connery, Roger Moore, Richard Burton and Michael Caine in a career that lasted nearly half a century and took in more than 100 credits on the big and small screen.

== Biography ==
Brace was born on 30 August 1924 in Weston-super-Mare, Somerset, to Joseph Herman, a tailor of military uniforms, and Eliza Jane Brace, a housemaid.

He made his film debut at the age of 23 in Ken Annakin's Holiday Camp (1947). His name was unfamiliar to the general public, but his face and size (6 ft 4 in tall) made him instantly recognizable. He was a stunt performer and minor actor in the following James Bond films: Dr. No (1962), From Russia with Love (1963), Goldfinger (1964), Casino Royale (1967) and You Only Live Twice (1967).

He also acted and did stunt work in films such as Ivanhoe (1952), A Night to Remember (1958), Lawrence of Arabia (1962), Deadlier Than the Male (1967), Where Eagles Dare (1968), Star Wars (1977), Flash Gordon (1980), Raiders of the Lost Ark (1981), Indiana Jones and the Temple of Doom (1984), Highlander (1986), Willow (1988), Batman (1989), Robin Hood: Prince of Thieves (1991), Chaplin (1992) and Braveheart (1995). Brace was the stunt double for Clancy Brown (the villain Kurgan) in Highlander and Peter Mayhew (Chewbacca) in Star Wars.

== Personal life ==
Brace died on 25 October 2018 at the age of 94.

== Partial filmography ==
- Holiday Camp (1947) - Jitterbug at Camp Dance (uncredited)
- Dick Barton: Special Agent (1948) - Henchman (uncredited)
- It's Not Cricket (1949) - Bar Patron (uncredited)
- Ivanhoe (1952) - Archer (uncredited)
- Appointment in London (1953) - RAF officer (uncredited)
- The Red Beret (1953) - MP (uncredited)
- Geordie (1955) - GB team member (uncredited)
- Reach for the Sky (1956) - German soldier (uncredited)
- Town on Trial (1957) - Molly's Boyfriend in Photo (uncredited)
- Ill Met by Moonlight (1957) - German soldier (uncredited)
- Quatermass 2 (1957) - Guard (uncredited)
- Blue Murder at St. Trinian's (1957) - New teacher (uncredited)
- A Night to Remember (1958) - Stoker (uncredited)
- Danger Within (1959) - P.O.W. (uncredited)
- Beyond This Place (1959) - Pub Customer (uncredited)
- The Challenge (1960) - Thug (uncredited)
- Fury at Smugglers' Bay (1961) - Smuggler (uncredited)
- Crooks Anonymous (1962) - Man in Labour Exchange (uncredited)
- We Joined the Navy (1962) - Leather Jacket Rebel (uncredited)
- Dr. No (1962, Stunts)
- Lawrence of Arabia (1962, Stunts)
- Captain Sindbad (1963)
- From Russia with Love (1963, Stunts)
- The Masque of the Red Death (1964) - Guard (uncredited)
- Goldfinger (1964, Stunts) - South American Guard (uncredited)
- Circus of Fear (1966) - Man in Speedboat
- The Sandwich Man (1966) - Workman (uncredited)
- Deadlier Than the Male (1967) - Car Park Assassin (uncredited)
- Don't Lose Your Head (1967) - Soldier (uncredited)
- Casino Royale (1967, Stunts) - Cowboy (uncredited)
- You Only Live Twice (1967, Stunt driver)
- A Challenge for Robin Hood (1967) - Outlaw (uncredited)
- Attack on the Iron Coast (1968) - Commando (uncredited)
- The Devil Rides Out (1968) - Satanist (uncredited)
- Some Girls Do (1969) - Petersen Bodyguard - Darker Hair (uncredited)
- Where Eagles Dare (1968, Stunts)
- Crooks and Coronets (1969) - Casino Security (uncredited)
- When Eight Bells Toll (1971, Stunts) - Thug (uncredited)
- Puppet on a Chain (1971) - Thug (uncredited)
- Tommy (1975) - Man with Knife (uncredited)
- The Pink Panther Strikes Again (1976) - 2nd Kidnapper
- Candleshoe (1977) - Charlie (uncredited)
- Star Wars (1977, Chewbacca's stunt double)
- Force 10 from Navarone (1978) - MP (uncredited)
- Flash Gordon (1980) - Ming's Brute
- Superman II (1980) - Man in Street (uncredited)
- Raiders of the Lost Ark (1981, Stunts) - German Soldier
- Curse of the Pink Panther (1983, Stunts) - Bruno's Crony #1
- Indiana Jones and the Temple of Doom (1984, Stunts)
- Highlander (1986, Kurgan's stunt double)
- Willow (1988, Stunts)
- Robin Hood: Prince of Thieves (1991, Stunts)
- Chaplin (1992, Stunt coordinator (UK))
- Braveheart (1995, Stunts)
