= Lines (song) =

Single by The Walker Brothers

from the album Lines
- B-side: "First Day"
- Released: September 24, 1976
- Recorded: 1976
- Studio: AIR (London, UK)
- Genre: Pop music, Rock, Country
- Length: 2:28
- Label: GTO Records
- Songwriter(s): Jerry Fuller
- Producer(s): Scott Walker and Geoff Calver

The Walker Brothers singles chronology
"No Regrets" (1975)	"Lines" (1976)	"We're All Alone" (1977)

"Lines" is a song written by the American singer-songwriter Jerry Fuller, first recorded by the American pop group The Walker Brothers as their twelfth UK single in 1976. Fuller later recorded and released his own version to some minor success in the US (#90) and Canadian Country charts (#60) in 1979.

The Walker Brothers' recording of "Lines" failed to chart, their first to miss the UK Singles Chart since their debut "Pretty Girls Everywhere" in 1965. The B-side "First Day" was written by John Walker under the pseudonym A. Dayam.

== Track listing ==
GTO Records – GT67
No.	Title	Writer(s)	Length
1.	"Lines"	Jerry Fuller	3:26
2.	"First Day"	A. Dayam	2:22
