= Images (The Walker Brothers album) =

Studio album by The Walker Brothers
- Released: March 3, 1967
- Genres: Pop music; baroque pop; blue-eyed soul
- Length: 41:00; 54:15 (Expanded CD)
- Label: Philips
- Producer: John Franz

The Walker Brothers chronology
The Sun Ain't Gonna Shine Anymore (1966)	Images (1967)	No Regrets (1975)

Singles from Images
- 1. "Experience" Released: May 1967; 2. "Everything Under the Sun" Released: June 1967

Images is the third album by the American pop group The Walker Brothers. Released in 1967 the album reached number six on the UK Albums Chart. It was the last of their trio of 1960s albums. They would not record together again until 1975's No Regrets.

The group's musical accompaniment was directed by Reg Guest and produced by John Franz. Receiving good to mixed reviews, the album was first released in both Mono and Stereo LP formats in March 1967. The album was later released on CD having been remastered and expanded in 1998. The sleeve notes were written by Alan Freeman.

== Reception ==
Images received good to mixed reviews from the majority of critics.

=== Legacy ===
Richie Unterberger, writing retrospectively for AllMusic, called the album "as wildly uneven as their other pair. Affecting pop/rock ballads and operatic crooner vehicles were interspersed with absolutely inappropriate up-tempo blue-eyed soul (always a weak point for the group) and rock covers". Unterberger rates Scott Walker's songs highly, noting that they "[exhibit] a growth that foreshadowed some of the more ambitious aspects of his early solo albums". He also described John Walker's "I Can't Let It Happen to You" as "one of The Walker Brothers' best songs, and undoubtedly the best thing John Walker contributed to their records".

== Track listing ==
Side one
No.	Title	Writer(s)	Length
1.	"Everything Under the Sun"	Bob Crewe, Gary Knight	4:15
2.	"Once Upon a Summertime"	Michel Legrand, Johnny Mercer, Eddy Marnay	3:49
3.	"Experience"	Scott Engel	2:53
4.	"Blueberry Hill"	Al Lewis, Vincent Rose, Larry Stock	3:25
5.	"Orpheus"	Scott Engel	3:24
6.	"Stand by Me"	Ben E. King, Jerry Leiber, Mike Stoller	3:27

Side two
No.	Title	Writer(s)	Length
7.	"I Wanna Know"	John Maus	2:28
8.	"I Will Wait for You" (Theme from Les Parapluies de Cherbourg)	music: Michel Legrand, lyrics: Jacques Demy; English lyrics: Norman Gimbel	3:38
9.	"It Makes No Difference Now"	Iller Pattacini; English lyrics: Mike Newell	2:37
10.	"I Can't Let It Happen to You"	John Maus	3:11
11.	"Genevieve"	Scott Engel	2:49
12.	"Just Say Goodbye"	Petula Clark, Pierre Delanoë, Tony Hatch	3:33

Expanded CD bonus tracks
No.	Title	Writer(s)	Length
13.	"Stay With Me Baby" (1967 A-Side)	Jerry Ragovoy, George David Weiss	3:22
14.	"Turn Out the Moon" (B-Side of "Stay With Me Baby")	Scott Engel	3:34
15.	"Walking in the Rain" (1967 A-Side)	Barry Mann, Phil Spector, Cynthia Weil	3:23
16.	"Baby Make It Last the Time" (B-Side of "Walking in the Rain")	Scott Engel, Kirk Duncan, Michael Nicholls	3:07

== Personnel ==
The Walker Brothers

- Gary Walker – drums, vocals
- John Walker – guitar, vocals
- Scott Walker –vocals, guitar, keyboards

with:

- Reg Guest – accompaniment

== Charts ==
Weekly chart performance for Images
Chart (1967)	Peak position
UK Disc and Music Echo Top Ten LPs	3
UK Melody Maker Top Ten LPs	5
UK New Musical Express Britain's Top 15 LPs	4
UK Record Retailer LPs Chart	6
West German Media Control Albums Chart	23
