= Gary Walker (musician) =

American musician (1942–2026)

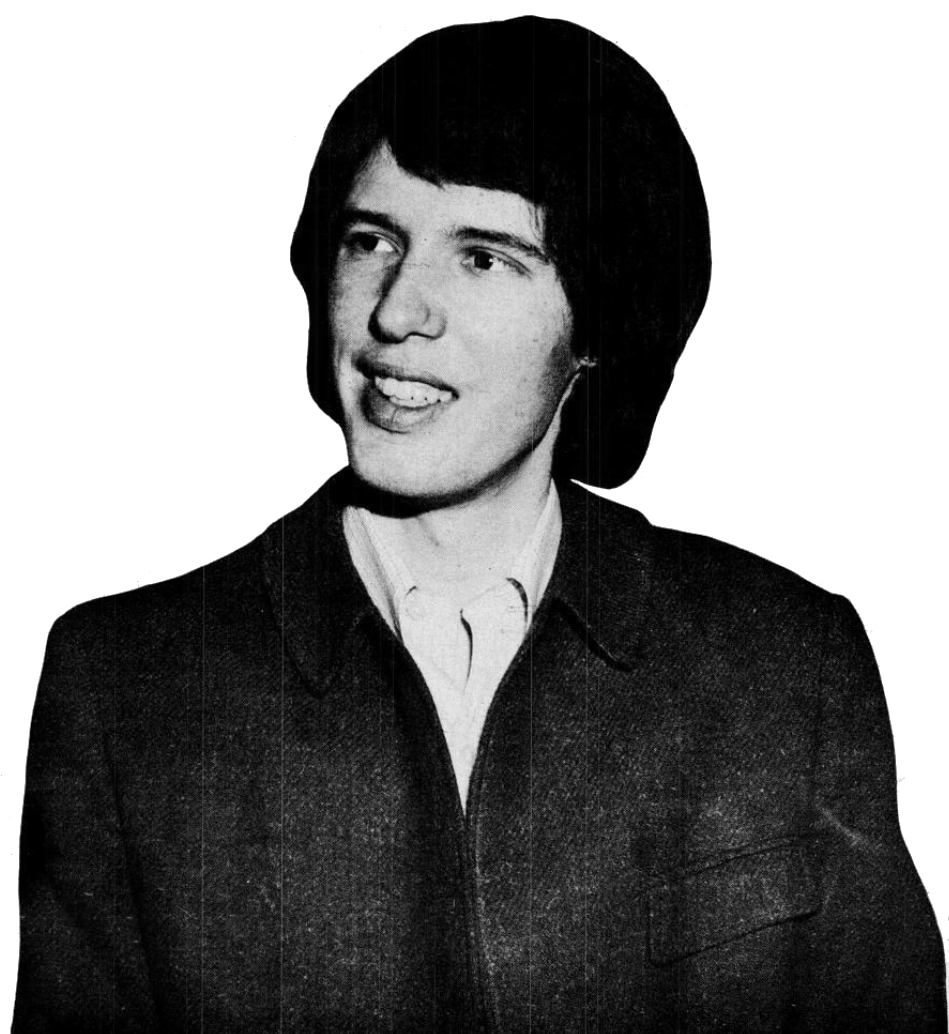
- Walker in 1966

Background information
- Born: Gary Leeds; March 9, 1942; Glendale, California, U.S.
- Died: March 1, 2026 (aged 83) Essex, England
- Genres: Rock
- Occupation: Musician
- Instruments: Drums; percussion; vocals
- Years active: 1962–2026
- Labels: CBS; United Artists; Philips; Polydor
- Formerly of: The Standells; The Walker Brothers; Gary Walker and the Rain

Gary Walker (born Gary Leeds; March 9, 1942 – March 1, 2026) was an American musician, who was the drummer and vocalist with both The Standells and The Walker Brothers.

== Career ==
Born Gary Leeds, his professional career started in 1962 when he was recruited to join The Standells. He toured with the group from 1962 to 1964. For a period of time in 1964, he toured with P. J. Proby.

In 1964, Gary met John Walker (real name John Maus) and Scott Walker (real name Scott Engel). The two persuaded Gary to join their band The Walker Brothers and take the stagename “Gary Walker” (something all three members did as they were not related). He has been credited as the catalyst in bringing the unrelated Walker Brothers to the UK in 1965 where, for a couple of years, they enjoyed commercial success. The Walker Brothers are best remembered for their 1966 hit single, a cover of Frankie Valli’s "The Sun Ain't Gonna Shine (Anymore)". He had two minor UK hit singles while still a member of the group in 1966. After a UK tour in April 1967, which also featured Jimi Hendrix, Cat Stevens, and Engelbert Humperdinck, followed by a tour of Japan in 1968, the group officially disbanded.

As a solo artist, Leeds released his debut single, "You Don't Love Me"/"Get It Right", in February 1966. He released two singles in May 1966 and 1968.

In 1967, he founded Gary Walker and the Rain, which consisted of Joey Molland (later of the band Badfinger, guitar and vocals); Charles "Paul" Crane (lead vocals, guitar); and John Lawson (bass guitar). They released four singles between 1968 and 1969. Their debut album, Album No.1, was published in 1968. His fourth and last single was a cover of The Easybeats’ 1968 song "Hello, How Are You", (B-side: “Fran”) which was released in March 1975 and was produced by Allan Clarke, former frontman for The Hollies.

Late in 1974, Walker, Engel and Leeds agreed to reform The Walker Brothers. In 1975, they released the album No Regrets. The title track went to no. 7 on the British charts. The second incarnation of the band split in 1978. In the following years, two reunion performances occurred, in 1982 and 1991.

Gary and John Walker, published their own joint autobiography, The Walker Brothers: No Regrets — Our Story, in 2009.

== Death ==
In December 2025, Walker suffered a stroke. He died on March 1, 2026, at the age of 83.

== Bands ==
- The Standells (1962–1964)
- The Walker Brothers (1964–1968, 1971, 1975–1978, 1982, 1991)
- Solo (1966–2026)
- Gary Walker and The Rain (1968–1969)

== Discography ==
=== The Walker Brothers ===
==== Albums ====
- Take It Easy with the Walker Brothers (1965)
- Introducing The Walker Brothers (1965) (1st US album)
- Portrait (1966)
- The Sun Ain't Gonna Shine Anymore (1966) (2nd US album)
- Images (1967)
- No Regrets (1975)
- Lines (1976)
- Nite Flights (1978)

=== Solo ===
==== Singles ====
- "You Don't Love Me" (T Raye) / "Get It Right" (J Stewart) – CBS 202036 – Feb 1966 (Produced by Scott Walker & John Stewart) UK No. 26 in February 1966
- "Twinkie-Lee" (J Bright) / "She Makes Me Feel Better" (J Stewart) – CBS 202081 – May 1966 (Produced by Scott Walker & John Stewart) UK No. 26 in May 1966
- "Hello, How Are You" (Vanda/Young) / "Fran" (Gary Leeds) – United Artists UP 34742 – March 1975 (Produced by Allan Clarke from The Hollies)
- "Cutie Morning Moon" (Scott Walker/Masaharu Honjo) / "Gary’s Theme" (Masaharu Honjo) – Philips FS 1041 - 1968 (Notes: Japan only released single recorded with The Carnabeats, produced by Scott Walker who also played bass guitar)

=== Gary Walker and the Rain ===
==== Singles ====
- "Spooky" (Middlebrooks/Shapiro) / "I Can't Stand To Lose You" (Gary Walker/Paul Crane) – Polydor 56237/Japan: Philips SFL 1150 – January 1968 (Produced by Scott Walker)
- "Come In You'll Get Pneumonia" (Vanda/Young) / "Francis" (Leeds/Molland/Crane/Lawson) – Philips BF 1740 – 1969
- "The View" (G Leeds/J Molland) / "Thoughts Of An Old Man" (G Leeds/J Molland) – Japan only: Philips SFL 1174 – 1968
- "Magazine Woman" (J Molland) / "Take A Look" (J Molland) – Japan only: Philips SFL 1740 – 1968

==== Albums ====
- Album No. 1 – Japan only: Philips SFX 7133 – 1968

== Bibliography ==
- The Walker Brothers: No Regrets — Our Story (2009)
