= Deadlier Than the Male =

1967 British film by Ralph Thomas

- British cinema poster
- Directed by: Ralph Thomas
- Screenplay by: Jimmy Sangster; David D. Osborn; Liz Charles-Williams
- Story by: Jimmy Sangster
- Based on: Bulldog Drummond by Sapper; Gerard Fairlie
- Produced by: Betty E. Box
- Starring: Richard Johnson; Elke Sommer; Sylva Koscina; Nigel Green
- Cinematography: Ernest Steward
- Edited by: Alfred Roome
- Music by: Malcolm Lockyer title song performed by The Walker Brothers
- Production company: Santor
- Distributed by: Rank Film Distributors (UK); Universal (US)
- Release date: 12 February 1967 (UK)
- Running time: 98 minutes
- Country: United Kingdom
- Language: English
- Budget: $1.7 million or £588,597

Deadlier Than the Male is a 1967 British crime and mystery film directed by Ralph Thomas and starring Richard Johnson and Elke Sommer. It is one of the many take-offs of James Bond produced during the 1960s, but is based on an already established detective fiction hero, Bulldog Drummond.

Drummond, updated to a suave Korean War veteran, trails a pair of sexy assassins who kill for sport and profit.

The title is a reference to the 1911 Rudyard Kipling poem The Female of the Species, which includes the line, "The female of the species must be deadlier than the male", and also refers to Sapper's earlier Drummond book, The Female of the Species.

A sequel, Some Girls Do, followed in 1969.

== Plot ==
The glamorous assassin Irma Eckman, disguised as an air stewardess, kills the oil tycoon Henry Keller with a booby-trapped cigar aboard his private jet, parachuting away before the plane explodes. She is picked up by a speedboat driven by her partner in crime, the equally beautiful Penelope. The villainous pair then murder David Wyngarde, making it look like a spear fishing accident. Sir John Bledlow, one of the directors of Phoenecian Oil, suspects that both deaths were the result of foul play; he had received an urgent message from Wyngarde that he needed to get in touch with Keller regarding a "matter of life and death". He asks Wyngarde's friend, Hugh "Bulldog" Drummond, to investigate.

A representative of an unknown party had approached Phoenecian and offered to overcome Keller's opposition to a merger with Phoenician within six months for one million pounds. Irma shows up at a board meeting to collect. However, the board is divided – with Henry Bridgenorth being the most vocal in opposition – and the vote is five to four against paying. That night, Irma and Penelope visit Bridgenorth at his apartment, with fatal results. When the board reconvenes, the directors vote unanimously to pay.

Carloggio, Wyngarde's servant, delivers a tiny bit of a taped message Wyngarde had recorded. Only part of one sentence remains (the assassins stole the rest). Irma and Penelope silence Carloggio, then Penelope delivers a box of deadly cigars to Drummond's flat while he is out. Brenda, a girl Drummond's nephew Robert has brought back to the flat, narrowly escapes the same fate as Keller. Later that night, another attempt is made on Drummond's life.

The next day, Irma makes Phoenecian another proposition: to get them the oil concession in the country of Akmata, despite the King's determination to develop the oil fields himself, for another million pounds. Drummond realises that the King's assassination is what the garbled tape was referring to. Meanwhile, Penelope abducts and tortures Robert, but he can tell her nothing. Drummond follows Irma back to their flat and is able to rescue Robert before he is blown up by a bomb left behind by the two women. He is then astonished to discover that Robert is an old college friend of the Akmatan King Fedra.

Irma does away with Weston, another Phoenecian board member. Drummond travels to the Mediterranean coast. After meeting and warning King Fedra, he is invited to a castle owned by the wealthy Carl Petersen, the genius behind the assassinations. It turns out that Petersen is none other than Weston. Drummond is not allowed to leave the castle. Irma attempts to seduce Drummond to distract him, but to her fury, he rejects her advances. Grace, one of Petersen's women, confides her desire to leave to Drummond, but Petersen is watching and listening electronically. Penelope is more successful in being Drummond's minder for Petersen and spends the night in Drummond's bed.

Petersen gives Grace a second chance; she uses the opportunity to board the King's yacht as soon as she has the chance, just as Petersen had planned. While playing chess against Petersen with giant motorised pieces, Drummond learns that Grace is unwittingly carrying the bomb intended for the King. He kills Petersen's bodyguard Chang and drops Petersen into the hole through which a chess piece is removed from play.

Drummond and Robert race to the King's yacht, capturing Irma and Penelope along the way, and bringing them along. When Irma and Penelope refuse to tell him where the bomb is hidden, Drummond searches Grace for the explosive, finally stripping her naked and throwing her overboard. When the guard holding Irma and Penelope at gunpoint is distracted by this, the pair escape. As they race away in a speedboat, Irma reveals that the bomb is in Grace's hairclip. Penelope is aghast; having envied Grace's chignon, she stole it and is wearing it. The two assassins are killed when it explodes. Meanwhile, Drummond and Robert dive into the sea to rescue Grace.

== Cast ==
- Richard Johnson as Hugh 'Bulldog' Drummond
- Elke Sommer as Irma Eckman
- Sylva Koscina as Penelope
- Nigel Green as Weston / Carl Petersen
- Suzanna Leigh as Grace
- Steve Carlson as Robert Drummond
- Virginia North as Brenda
- Justine Lord as Peggy Ashenden
- Leonard Rossiter as Henry Bridgenorth
- Laurence Naismith as Sir John Bledlow
- Zia Mohyeddin as King Fedra
- Lee Montague as Boxer
- Milton Reid as Chang
- Yasuko Nagazumi as Mitsouko
- Didi Sydow as Anna
- George Pastell as Carloggio
- John Stone as David Wyngarde
- Dervis Ward as Keller
- William Mervyn as a Chairman of the Phoenician Board
- Peter Brace as a Car Park Assassin (uncredited) and stunts

== Production ==
=== Development ===
The producer Bruce Newberry bought up rights to the Bulldog Drummond stories after reading that Drummond was the third most favourite fictional character in America, after Sherlock Holmes and Tarzan. He hired Jimmy Sangster to write a script.

Newberry secured finance through the Rank Organisation, who announced it in February 1964 under the title of Female of the Species. It was going to be part of an eight-film slate from Rank worth £4.5 million.

In July 1964 Sangster said he had raised £5 million to make three Bulldog Drummond films at a total cost of £2 million, plus a television series worth £3 million. Burl Ives was named as a possibility to play the villain. Sangster was unable to find a male star suitable for financiers. Names discussed included Stanley Baker, Peter O'Toole, Jack Hawkins, Stephen Boyd and David Niven. "If we can't get a British actor we would like somebody from the Commonwealth," said Sangster. "The favourite would be [the Australian actor] Rod Taylor."

Sangster said "the new film Drummond, though a member of the Mayfair set, will have a job and will be much more sympathetic to women than the Drummond of the books. The new Drummond will be a Lloyds underwriter who travels the world. He mixes with high society not, like Bond, because of his job, but because he is a member of high society himself. The first film is set in London and the Middle East and involves murder and intrigue in big business."

The film wound up not being produced until 1966, with Sangster's script rewritten. It was the first production from Amerlon Productions, a subsidiary of Inflight, the company that showed in-flight films.

In March 1966 Rank announced it would make nine films with a total cost of £7.5 million of which it would provide £4 million. Two films were financed by Rank completely, a Norman Wisdom picture and a "doctor" comedy (Doctor in Trouble). The others were The Quiller Memorandum, Deadlier Than the Male, Maroc 7, Red Hot Ferrari (never made), The Fifth Coin (never made), The Battle of Britain and The Long Duel. Deadlier Than the Male was the Bulldog Drummond film, with Richard Johnson cast as Drummond. Filmink called it "one of several thrillers made by Rank that were co-productions partly shot in Europe using international 'names'."

=== Shooting ===
Filming, in Technicolor and Techniscope, began in London on 23 May 1966. The movie was shot at Pinewood Studios in London and in Lerici and La Spezia, Liguria, Italy.

In an interview, the director Ralph Thomas stated that the film was intended as a pilot for a television series. Thomas admitted he did it for "greed. I had three months; they gave me a lot of money; I had a lot of fun and I enjoyed making it. It was a great location and the picture looked gorgeous. That's it."

Sommer was paid $170,000 for her role.

Johnson later said:

I consciously tried to use more of myself than in anything else I've done... It was an entirely new creation that was not in the Drummond books. I couldn't respect the man. He was bigoted and brutal. A Nazi character. I didn't attempt to make myself into that character. We started with a fresh page. I said, all right, if you want me, you'll get me, but this is a braver, more physical version of me.

The producers battled the British Board of Film Censors who strongly objected to the film's use of women assassins, torture and promiscuity, earning the film an X rating.

== Music ==
"Deadlier Than the Male", the song featured in the film's opening credit sequence, was performed by the Walker Brothers.

== Critical reception ==
The Monthly Film Bulletin wrote: "Bulldog Drummond is here resurrected for the screen in a form to meet the demands of contemporary folklore, and comes off rather the worse for it. His adversaries have changed too: Carl Petersen duly makes his appearance towards the end in a preposterous game of chess with lifesize, electronically operated chessmen, but most of Drummond's attention is engaged by two sinisterly seductive females who deal out torture and time-bombs with sadistic glee. Worse, the film has been dolled up with a glossy veneer (exploding cigars, a luxury yacht) which succeeds only in giving it the look of a poor imitation. Richard Johnson performs adequately enough in the face of the script's parade of well-worn clichés, but Elke Sommer and Sylva Koscina have little more to do than look voluptuously villainous. The original Drummond would have found the whole thing rather distasteful."

Filmink argued "the movie was stolen by its splendid female villains, Elke Sommer and Sylva Koscina (the opening scene was copied for the 2000 Charlie's Angels)."
