= (Baby) You Don't Have to Tell Me =

Single by The Walker Brothers

from the album The Sun Ain't Gonna Shine Anymore
- B-side: "My Love Is Growing"; "Young Man Cried"
- Released: July 1966
- Recorded: 1966
- Genre: Pop; baroque pop
- Length: 2:28
- Label: Philips; Smash; Star-Club
- Songwriter(s): Pete Antell
- Producer(s): Reg Guest

The Walker Brothers singles chronology
"'I Need You'" (1966)	"(Baby) You Don't Have to Tell Me" (1966)	"Another Tear Falls" (1966)

"(Baby) You Don't Have to Tell Me" (often written "You Don't Have to Tell Me") is a song by New York songwriter Pete Antell (formerly of the American pop group The Chants) and first recorded by singer Bobby Coleman. The obscure song was later recorded and released by the American pop group the Walker Brothers as their sixth single in 1966. The accompaniment was directed by Reg Guest.

"(Baby) You Don't Have to Tell Me" was a modest hit for the Walker Brothers, spending eight weeks on the UK Singles Chart and peaking at number 13. In comparison to their previous three singles, each of which made the top three, the single was a disappointment and marked the beginning of the group's popular decline. Despite the single's underperformance, Portrait, the group's second album, was released at the same time was much more popular, reaching number three on the UK Albums Chart.

In most territories the single was backed with "My Love Is Growing", a song co-written by Scott Walker's former musical partner John Stewart. In the US the single was backed by a Scott Walker-John Franz original, "Young Man Cried".

== Track listing ==
Philips - BF 1497
No.	Title	Writer(s)	Length
1.	"(Baby) You Don't Have to Tell Me"	Pete Antell	2:28
2.	"My Love Is Growing"	J. Stewart, R. Van Leeuwen	2:22

Smash Records - S-2048
No.	Title	Writer(s)	Length
1.	"(Baby) You Don't Have to Tell Me"	Pete Antell	2:28
2.	"Young Man Cried"	Scott Engel, John Franz	2:33

== Chart positions ==
Chart (1966)	Peak position
Dutch Top 40	37
Germany Media Control singles chart	21
UK Singles Chart	13
