= Another Tear Falls =

Single by The Walker Brothers
- B-side: "Saddest Night in the World", "Saturday's Child"
- Released: September 1966; October 1966 (DE)
- Recorded: 1966
- Genre: Pop, baroque pop
- Length: 2:28
- Label: Philips Records, Star-Club
- Songwriter(s): Burt Bacharach, Hal David
- Producer(s): Reg Guest

The Walker Brothers singles chronology
"(Baby) You Don't Have to Tell Me" (1966)	"Another Tear Falls" (1966)	"'Solo John/Solo Scott'" (1966)

"Another Tear Falls" is a song written by Bacharach with lyrics by David. It was first recorded by American singer Gene McDaniels in 1962 for the British film It's Trad, Dad! and also appeared as the flip side of his hit single "Chip Chip". The song was later recorded and released by American pop group The Walker Brothers as their seventh UK single in 1966. The accompaniment was directed by Reg Guest.

"Another Tear Falls" was a modest hit, spending eight weeks on the UK Singles Chart and peaking at No. 12 in October. The single was another relative disappointment for the group and confirmed a decline in their commercial fortunes. It was also the group's last single released in their native United States, where it failed to chart. Despite the single's underperformance, Portrait, the group's second album, was released around the same time and was much more popular, reaching No. 3 on the UK Albums Chart.

The B-side, "Saddest Night in the World," is notable because although it is sung by Scott Engel, it is one of John Walker's first compositions. John Walker went on to contribute two songs to the group's following album, both of which he handled lead vocals.

In some territories, "Saddest Night in the World" was replaced with "Saturday's Child," an upbeat album track written by Scott Walker that appeared as the second track on Portrait.

== Track listings ==
Philips – BF 1514
No.	Title	Writer(s)	Length
1.	"Another Tear Falls"	Bacharach, David	2:28
2.	"Saddest Night in the World"	John Maus	2:13

Star-Club – 148 570 STF
No.	Title	Writer(s)	Length
1.	"Another Tear Falls"	Bacharach, David	2:28
2.	"Saturday's Child"	Scott Engel	2:07

== Chart positions ==
Chart (1966)	Peak position
Germany Media Control singles chart	24
UK Singles Chart	12
