= Scorpio Sound =

British recording studio

Coordinates: 51.525403°N 0.139036°W

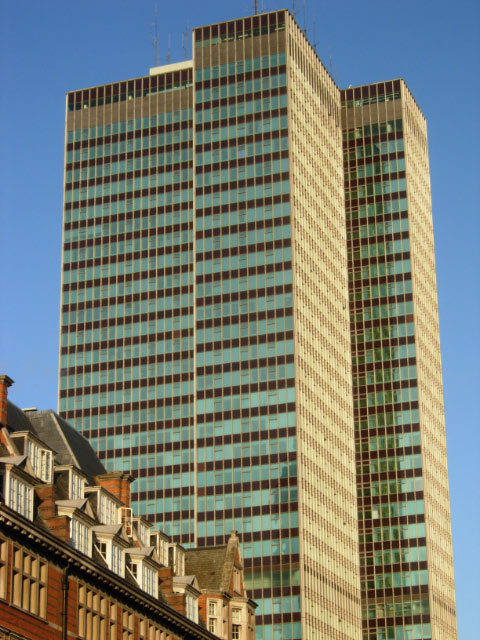
Euston tower

Scorpio Sound (aka Scorpio Studios and Scorpio Sound Studios) was a recording studio in London, England. It was located in Euston Tower, Euston Road, Camden, London, on the ground floor.

The studio was in operation from 1972 to 1984. Producers and engineers who worked at the studios included Ray Hendriksen, Pete Hoskins, and Dennis Weinreich. Pete Hoskins was the studio manager from 1977. The studio was later used by Capital Radio, located in the same building on the floor above, for recording bands, live broadcasts, political discussion programmes, etc.

The rock band Queen recorded parts of the album A Night At The Opera at the studio, including the lead vocals for the song "Bohemian Rhapsody".

In 1975 Irish artist Chris de Burgh recorded parts of his album Spanish Train and Other Stories in these studios.
