= I Need You (The Walker Brothers EP) =

EP by The Walker Brothers
- Released: June 1966
- Recorded: 1966
- Genre: Pop, baroque pop, blue-eyed soul
- Length: 10:10
- Label: Philips
- Producer: John Franz

The Walker Brothers chronology
The Sun Ain't Gonna Shine Anymore (1966)	I Need You (1966)	(Baby) You Don't Have to Tell Me (1966)

I Need You is an extended play by the American pop group The Walker Brothers. It was released in 1966 reached number one on the UK EP Chart. It was released following the group's second UK #1 single when the group were at the height of their popularity.

The EP was produced by John Franz, Ivor Raymonde and Reg Guest directed the musical accompaniment and the group's live backing band The Quotations performed on "Everything's Gonna Be All Right". The EP is also notable as it includes the original Scott Walker and John Franz composition "Young Man Cried". In Australia "Young Man Cried" was omitted from the EP and replaced with the album track "Land of 1,000 Dances" from the group's debut album.

All four tracks have since been re-released on the expanded edition of the group's début album.

== Track listing ==
Philips - 434 568 BE (UK)

Side one
No.	Title	Writer(s)	Length
1.	"Looking for Me"	Randy Newman	2:11
2.	"Young Man Cried"	Scott Engel, John Franz	2:33

Side two
No.	Title	Writer(s)	Length
3.	"Everything's Gonna Be All Right"	Willie Mitchell	2:16
4.	"I Need You"	Carole King, Gerry Goffin	3:10

Philips - PE 45 (Australia)

Side one
No.	Title	Writer(s)	Length
1.	"I Need You"	Carole King, Gerry Goffin	3:10
2.	"Looking For Me"	Randy Newman	2:11

Side two
No.	Title	Writer(s)	Length
3.	"Land of 1,000 Dances"	Chris Kenner	2:35
4.	"Everything's Gonna Be All Right"	Willie Mitchell	2:16

== Personnel ==
- Ivor Raymonde – accompaniment direction ("Looking For Me")
- Reg Guest – accompaniment direction ("Young Man Cried" and "I Need You")
- The Quotations – featured ("Everything's Gonna Be All Right")

== Chart positions ==
Chart (1966)	Peak position
UK EP chart	1
