= Make It Easy on Yourself =

1962 single by Jerry Butler

"Make It Easy on Yourself" is a popular song written by Burt Bacharach and Hal David which was initially a top 20 Pop and R&B hit for Jerry Butler in 1962. The best-known version is the 1965 recording by the Walker Brothers, for whom it was a No. 1 UK and Canadian hit. Dionne Warwick, who made a demo of the song in early 1962, later had a hit with it in 1970.

== Jerry Butler ==
"Make It Easy on Yourself"

Single by Jerry Butler

from the album Need to Belong & Other Great Performances
- B-side: "It's Too Late"
- Released: June 1962
- Recorded: Spring 1962
- Genre: Pop, easy listening
- Length: 2:30
- Label: Vee-Jay
- Songwriters: Burt Bacharach, Hal David
- Producer: Calvin Carter

Jerry Butler singles chronology
"Island of Sirens" (1961)	"Make It Easy on Yourself" (1962)	"You Can Run But You Can't Hide" (1965)

Chicago-based Vee-Jay Records head A&R man, Calvin Carter, brought back "Make It Easy on Yourself" from a trip to New York City where he scouted song publishers. Carter played the demo, featuring Dionne Warwick's vocal, for Vee-Jay artist Jerry Butler who commented: "Man, it's a great song, and the girl who's singing it, and the arrangement, is a hit." When Carter explained that Florence Greenberg, the owner of Scepter Records, who had recently signed Warwick, was not interested in "Make It Easy on Yourself", Butler recalled being "ecstatic" and, wanting the same arrangement featured on the demo, flew to New York City to record the song in a session overseen by Burt Bacharach, although Bacharach's official credit was limited to arranger. "Make It Easy on Yourself" was released in June 1962 and reached No. 20 on the Billboard Hot 100 that August, and No. 18 on the R&B chart.

The single was released in New Zealand on the Allied International label.

== The Walker Brothers ==
"Make It Easy on Yourself"

Single by The Walker Brothers

from the album Take It Easy with the Walker Brothers
- B-side: "But I Do", "Doin' the Jerk" (second US pressing)
- Released: August 1965 (UK); September 1965 (US)
- Recorded: June 1965
- Studio: Philips (London)
- Genre: Baroque pop; lounge
- Length: 3:11
- Label: Philips Records BF 1428; Smash Records (U.S.)
- Songwriters: Burt Bacharach and Hal David
- Producer: Johnny Franz

The Walker Brothers singles chronology
"Love Her" (1965)	"Make It Easy on Yourself" (1965)	"My Ship Is Coming In" (1965)

The most successful pop version of "Make It Easy on Yourself" was the 1965 single by the Walker Brothers which reached No. 16 on the US Billboard Hot 100 that December, having been a No. 1 hit in the UK in September 1965. It was the opening song on the group's début studio album, Take It Easy with the Walker Brothers, and as the opening song on side 2 of their début US album, Introducing the Walker Brothers.

Although based in London, the Walker Brothers were familiar with the original 1962 hit by Jerry Butler, which had been overlooked in its concurrent UK release, and group member John Maus suggested that the Walker Brothers record it. The track was recorded in a June 1965 session at the Philips Studios near Marble Arch in London, arranged by Ivor Raymonde, who conducted his orchestra, with production credited to Philips' head of A&R, Johnny Franz. Session personnel included Vic Flick and Big Jim Sullivan on guitars, and Ronnie Verrell on drums.

The recording was in the style of Phil Spector's "Wall of Sound", and included a wordless chorus. It ended with a long cadence chord in the orchestra, while the Butler version ended in a fade-out during the coda.

In most territories, the single was backed with "But I Do". In the US, Smash Records released a second pressing of the single in October 1965, with Scott Walker's debut composition "Doin' the Jerk" as the B-side. The up-tempo novelty dance track had already appeared as the B-side of the group's debut single, "Pretty Girls Everywhere".

In 2001, the Walker Brothers' "Make It Easy On Yourself" was sampled extensively by the Northern Irish band, Ash, on their single, "Candy".

=== Chart history ===
Chart (1965)	Peak position
Canadian RPM Top Singles	1
Irish Singles Chart	3
UK Singles Chart	1
US Billboard Hot 100	16

== Dionne Warwick ==
"Make It Easy on Yourself"

Single by Dionne Warwick

from the album Very Dionne
- B-side: "Knowing When to Leave"
- Released: September 1970 (US)
- Recorded: 1970
- Genre: Pop
- Length: 3:32
- Label: Scepter Records
- Songwriters: Burt Bacharach and Hal David
- Producer: Blue Jac Production

Dionne Warwick singles chronology
"Paper Maché" (1970)	"Make It Easy on Yourself" (1970)	"The Green Grass Starts to Grow" (1970)

Dionne Warwick's session work on the Drifters' track "Mexican Divorce", recorded in July 1961 and released in January 1962, brought her to the attention of Burt Bacharach, who subsequently had Warwick regularly provide vocals on demos of his songs, beginning with "Make It Easy on Yourself". On the strength of her vocals on another demo, "It's Love That Really Counts", Warwick was signed by Florence Greenberg of Scepter Records, although Greenberg gave the last-named song to the Shirelles as a B-side while rejecting "Make It Easy on Yourself" altogether, leading to the song being shopped to Jerry Butler.

Warwick had assumed "Make It Easy on Yourself" would serve as her own debut single. On learning from Burt Bacharach and co-composer Hal David that Jerry Butler was recording the song, a keenly disappointed Warwick dismissed the composers' assurance of providing her with an equally potent song with the words: "Don't make me over, man" - i.e. "Don't con me". Bacharach and David utilized Warwick's pessimistic response (with a shift in meaning) as the title for "Don't Make Me Over", the song which would launch Warwick's hit-making career.

Warwick's spring 1962 demo version of "Make It Easy on Yourself" was featured as an album track on Warwick's 1963 debut album, Presenting Dionne Warwick, but the version of the song which became a hit for her was a recording of a live performance in a concert which took place at the Garden State Arts Center in Holmdel, New Jersey, in the summer of 1970. As with Warwick's 1966 hit "Message to Michael", the non-involvement of Bacharach and David in the track, beyond writing the song, is evidenced by its producer's credit reading: "a Blue Jac Production". Blue Jac Productions was the name Bacharach/David and Warwick had incorporated under in 1962. Officially, Blue Jac Productions, rather than Warwick personally, was signed to Scepter Records.

The only live track by Warwick released as a single, "Make It Easy on Yourself" served as the advance single for Warwick's final album of new material for Scepter, the December 1970 release, Very Dionne. The single charted that autumn, with chief support from easy listening radio, as indicated by its No. 2 peak on that format's chart, and made a moderate crossover to pop, peaking at No. 37, the final Top 40 hit of the first phase of Warwick's career. It reached No. 26 on the R&B chart.

=== Chart history ===
Chart (1970)	Peak position
Canadian (RPM) Top Singles	24
Australia (KMR) Top Singles	2
US Billboard Hot 100	37
US Billboard Hot Adult Contemporary	2
US Billboard Hot Soul Singles	26
US Cash Box Top 100	25

== Other versions ==
In 1966, Cilla Black released a recording of the song on her second studio album, Cilla Sings a Rainbow, which was a Top 5 hit on the UK album chart.

Bacharach sung a version of the song on his album of the same name from 1969. As David Freeland wrote in American Songwriter, "Sporting an arrangement more adventurous than those featured on the earlier, hit versions, the track is nonetheless marred by Bacharach’s oft-cited lack of vocal ability."

The 1972, Johnny Mathis album, Song Sung Blue, produced by Jerry Fuller, featured a version of "Make It Easy on Yourself". Issued as a single, the track reached No. 16 on the U.S. Easy Listening chart, and "bubbled under the Hot 100" with a No. 103 peak. In Canada, his version reached number two on the Adult Contemporary chart. In the UK, Mathis' Song Sung Blue album was released with the title Make It Easy on Yourself.

In 1989, girl group The Three Degrees recorded a version for their album …And Holding. The song was released as the second single from the album with Valerie Holiday providing lead vocal.

A shortened version of the song appears as part of a Burt Bacharach medley on several of the Carpenters'albums from the 1970s, and as part of the same medley on a 1980 TV special called "Music, Music, Music". Also, the medley appears in several live concert video and/or audio recordings. In all cases the lead vocal is performed by Karen Carpenter, considered by many as one of the finest singers of popular music ever.
