= My Ship Is Comin' In =

"My Ship Is Coming In"

Single by The Walker Brothers

from the album Introducing the Walker Brothers
- B-side: "You're All Around Me"
- Released: 26 November 1965 (UK); January 1966 (US)
- Recorded: 1965
- Genre: Pop, easy listening
- Length: 3:15 (mono); 2:56 (stereo)
- Label: Philips Records; Smash Records (US)
- Songwriter: Joey Brooks
- Producer: Ivor Raymonde

The Walker Brothers singles chronology
"Make It Easy on Yourself" (1965)	"My Ship Is Coming In" (1965)	"The Sun Ain't Gonna Shine Anymore" (1966)

"My Ship Is Comin' In" is a song written by Joseph Brooks (credited as "Joey Brooks"), which was first a song for the American soul singer Jimmy Radcliffe in 1965 and was later recorded and released by the American pop group The Walker Brothers as their fourth single that same year. Outside the US and Canada, the song's title was "My Ship Is Coming In". The accompaniment was directed by Ivor Raymonde. The song appeared as the opening track on the group's debut US studio album Introducing the Walker Brothers.

"My Ship Is Coming In" was a major hit in Britain, spending twelve weeks on the UK Singles Chart and peaking at No. 3 in January 1966, and their second of three hits in the US peaking at No. 63 on the Billboard Hot 100. "You're All Around Me" was included as the b-side and is the second song to have a writing credit from Scott Walker (as Scott Engel), the song written with singer-songwriter Lesley Duncan was also featured on the group's début album Take It Easy with The Walker Brothers.

== Track listing ==
Philips – BF 1454 / Smash Records S-2016
No.	Title	Writer(s)	Length
1.	"My Ship Is Coming In"	Joey Brooks	3:15
2.	"You're All Around Me"	Engel, Duncan	2:39

== Chart positions ==
=== Weekly charts ===
Chart (1965–1966)	Peak position
Canada (RPM)	41
Malaysia (Radio Malaysia)	9
New Zealand (Listener)	17
Singapore (Radio Singapore)	8
UK (Disc Weekly)	4
UK (Melody Maker)	5
UK (New Musical Express)	4
UK (Record Retailer)	3
US Billboard Hot 100	63
US Cash Box Top 100	68
US Record World 100 Top Pops	62

=== Year-end charts ===
Chart (1965)	Peak position
UK (Record Retailer)	94

Chart (1966)	Peak position
UK (Record Retailer)	65
