= Lines (The Walker Brothers album) =

Studio album by The Walker Brothers
- Released: October 1976
- Recorded: 1976
- Studios: AIR (London, UK)
- Genres: Pop, rock, country
- Length: 36:21
- Label: GTO
- Producers: Scott Walker, Geoff Calver

The Walker Brothers chronology
No Regrets (1975)	Lines (1976)	Nite Flights (1978)

Scott Walker chronology
No Regrets (1975)	Lines (1976)	Nite Flights (1978)

Singles from Lines
- 1. "Lines" b/w "First Day" Released: 24 September 1976; 2. "We're All Alone" b/w "Have You Seen My Baby" Released: 3 December 1976

Lines is the fifth studio album by the American pop group The Walker Brothers. The album was released in 1976 and was the second since reforming in 1975. The album failed to chart and neither of its singles, "Lines" and "We're All Alone", met with much success.

The album was stylistically similar to their 1975 comeback No Regrets, matching the general musical styles of country and pop music and marrying them to romantic orchestral arrangements. Aside from "First Day" which was actually written by John Walker under the pseudonym A. Dayam, the album is made up of non-original compositions. Scott Walker would not contribute new songs to the group until the following album Nite Flights.

== Reception ==
Professional ratings
Review scores
Source	Rating
Allmusic	2/5 stars

Lines received mixed reviews from the majority of critics.

== Track listing ==
Side one
No.	Title	Writer(s)	Length
1.	"Lines"	Jerry Fuller	3:26
2.	"Taking It All In Stride"	Tom Snow	4:33
3.	"Inside of You"	Tom Jans	3:35
4.	"Have You Seen My Baby"	Randy Newman	3:31
5.	"We're All Alone"	Boz Scaggs	4:35

Side two
No.	Title	Writer(s)	Length
6.	"Many Rivers to Cross"	Jimmy Cliff	4:38
7.	"First Day"	A. Dayam	2:22
8.	"Brand New Tennessee Waltz"	Jesse Winchester	3:11
9.	"Hard To Be Friends"	Larry Murray	3:27
10.	"Dreaming As One"	David Palmer, William Smith	3:03

== Personnel ==
- Bones (Brigette du Doit, Janice Slater, Joy Yates, Suzanne Lynch), The Charles Young Choral – backing vocals
- Alan Jones – electric bass
- Steve Gray – string arrangements, conductor
- Barry Morgan, Brian Bennett, Simon Phillips – drums
- Alan Parker – acoustic and electric guitar, mandolin, high-strung guitar, slide guitar
- Paul Keogh – acoustic guitar
- The David Katz Orchestra – orchestra
- Gary Walker, Tristan Fry – percussion
- John Mealing, Steve Gray – acoustic piano
- Dave MacRae – electric piano
- Alan Skidmore, Dave Wilus, Jeff Daly – saxophone
- Roger Churchyard – "blue grass" violin
- John Walker, Scott Walker – acoustic guitar, vocals
- Geoff Crook – cover illustration

== Release details ==
Country	Date	Label	Format	Catalog
United Kingdom	1976	GTO Records	Vinyl	GTLP 014
United Kingdom and Europe	1994	Sony Music Entertainment Inc.	CD	483674-10
