= No Regrets (Tom Rush song) =

1968 single by Tom Rush

Single by Tom Rush

from the album The Circle Game
- B-side: "Shadow Dream Song"
- Released: January 19, 1968
- Genre: Folk rock
- Length: 3:50
- Label: Elektra
- Songwriter: Tom Rush
- Producer: Arthur Gorson

Tom Rush singles chronology
"On the Road Again" (1967)	"No Regrets" (1968)	"Something in the Way She Moves" (1968)

"No Regrets"

Single by Tom Rush

from the album Ladies Love Outlaws
- Released: January 1975
- Genre: Folk rock, country rock
- Length: 5:40
- Label: Columbia
- Songwriter: Tom Rush
- Producer: Mark Spector

Tom Rush singles chronology
"Ladies Love Outlaws" (1974)	"No Regrets" (1975)

"No Regrets" is a song by folk and blues singer/songwriter Tom Rush. It is the final song on his 1968 album The Circle Game and was released as a single in the UK in January 1968 and in the US in April. It peaked at number 57 on the UK BMRB Breakers, an official extension of the UK Singles Chart.

His 1968 composition has become an acknowledged standard, with numerous cover versions having been recorded, most notably by The Walker Brothers. In addition to his 1968 sparse acoustic recording of the song, Rush later recorded a more lush, orchestrated pop version for Columbia Records featuring Carly Simon on background vocals and a screaming electric guitar solo for his 1974 album Ladies Love Outlaws.

== The Walker Brothers version ==
"No Regrets"

Single by The Walker Brothers

from the album No Regrets
- B-side: "Remember Me"
- Released: November 14, 1975
- Recorded: 1975
- Studio: Marquee Studios (London); Kingsway Recorders (London); Air Studios (London)
- Genre: Pop; soft rock; country rock
- Length: 5:47
- Label: GTO
- Songwriter: Tom Rush
- Producers: Scott Walker; Geoff Calver

The Walker Brothers singles chronology
"Love Her (reissue)" (1971)	"No Regrets" (1975)	"Lines" (1976)

The Walker Brothers recorded and released "No Regrets" as their comeback single in 1975, their first since 1967's "Walking in the Rain" and eleventh overall.

The song was also used as the title of its parent album. The single was slightly different as it features a John Walker harmony vocal not present on the album version which in turn includes female backing singers absent from the single.

"No Regrets" was a major hit spending twelve weeks on the UK Singles Chart and peaking at #7 in February 1976 giving Rush belated Top Ten exposure as a songwriter in the UK. The single would prove to be the group's final taste of commercial success while together, as the parent album and subsequent Walker Brothers releases failed to find a wide audience. The B-side "Remember Me" was written by John Walker under the pseudonym A. Dayam.

=== Track listing ===
GTO – GT 42
No.	Title	Writer(s)	Length
1.	"No Regrets"	Rush	5:47
2.	"Remember Me"	A. Dayam	3:51

=== Chart positions ===
Chart (1975–76)	Peak position
Australia (Kent Music Report)	28
Belgium (Ultratop 50 Flanders)	10
Ireland (IRMA)	5
Netherlands (Dutch Top 40)	7
Netherlands (Dutch Top 40)	9
UK Singles (OCC)	7

== Midge Ure version ==
"No Regrets"
- 12" single cover

Single by Midge Ure
- B-side: "Mood Music"
- Released: 4 June 1982
- Recorded: 1982
- Studio: Mayfair Studios (London)
- Genre: Synth-pop
- Length: 4:00
- Label: Chrysalis
- Songwriter: Tom Rush
- Producer: Midge Ure

Midge Ure singles chronology
"No Regrets" (1982)	"After a Fashion" (1983)

Scottish musician Midge Ure released a cover of the song as his debut solo single on 4 June 1982. "No Regrets" was also produced by Ure, who was "tired of doing it for others, so I decided to do it for myself" and was co-produced and engineered by John Hudson.

=== Background ===
In 1976, Ure went on Top of the Pops as part of Slik with "Forever and Ever". At the same time, the Walker Brothers were also on with their version of "No Regrets". Ure said that "it just stuck in the back of my head" and after doing a favour for a studio engineer (presumably John Hudson), Ure was offered some studio time. So, he decided to record "No Regrets" based on what he remembered of the Walker Brothers' version. Ure also said that "it was dabbling with fire, I should not have gone anywhere near it". After the release of the single, Ure also thought about doing a solo album, but never found the time and it was not until 1985 that he released his album The Gift.

=== Reception ===
Reviewing for Record Mirror, Simon Tebbutt described the song as "a brilliant mixture of the big emotional American ballad … with the kind of clean cut and almost cold European precision we've come to associate with Mr Ure."

=== Track listing ===
Chrysalis – CHS 2618 / CHS 12 2618
No.	Title	Writer(s)	Length
1.	"No Regrets"	Rush	4:00
2.	"Mood Music"	Ure	3:30

=== Personnel ===
- Midge Ure – all instrumentation, producer
- John Hudson – co-producer (1), recording engineer (1)
- Brian Tench – co-producer (2), recording engineer (2)
- Jack Hunt – cutting engineer at Utopia Studios
- Peter Saville – design
- Trevor Key – photography

=== Charts ===
Chart (1982)	Peak position
Australia (Kent Music Report)	53
Ireland (IRMA)	11
New Zealand (Recorded Music NZ)	35
UK Singles (OCC)	9
