= Deadlier Than the Male (song) =

Single by The Walker Brothers
- B-side: "Archangel"
- Released: December 1966
- Recorded: 1966
- Genre: Pop, baroque pop
- Length: 2:32
- Label: Philips Records, Star-Club (Germany)
- Songwriter(s): Scott Engel, John Franz
- Producer(s): Reg Guest

The Walker Brothers singles chronology
"'Solo John/Solo Scott'" (1966)	"Deadlier Than the Male" (1966)	"Stay With Me Baby" (1967)

"Deadlier Than the Male" is a song written by American singer-songwriter Scott Walker under his real name of Scott Engel with UK record producer Johnny Franz. The song was first recorded and released by Walker's pop group The Walker Brothers as their eighth single in 1966. The accompaniment was directed by Reg Guest. The song was the title track for the 1967 British action film Deadlier Than the Male, which featured the character of Bulldog Drummond.

The song's title is a reference to the 1911 Rudyard Kipling poem "The Female of the Species," which includes the line, "The female of the species must be deadlier than the male", and also refers to Sapper's earlier Drummond book The Female of the Species.

"Deadlier Than the Male" was a minor hit, spending six weeks on the UK Singles Chart and peaking at No. 32. The single was released concurrently that December with the EP Solo John/Solo Scott. Sales of the single may have been lowered by the label's strategy of releasing them both at once.

The single is essentially a Scott Walker solo release, as he sang lead vocals and wrote/co-wrote both tracks. Previously Scott had only contributed album tracks and B-sides. "Deadlier Than the Male" is also notable for having been Walker's first A-side.

== Track listing ==
Philips – BF 1537
No.	Title	Writer(s)	Length
1.	"Deadlier Than the Male"	S. Engel, J. Franz	2:32
2.	"Archangel"	S. Engel	3:48

== Chart positions ==
Chart (1966)	Peak position
UK Singles Chart	32
