= The Walker Brothers =

American pop group

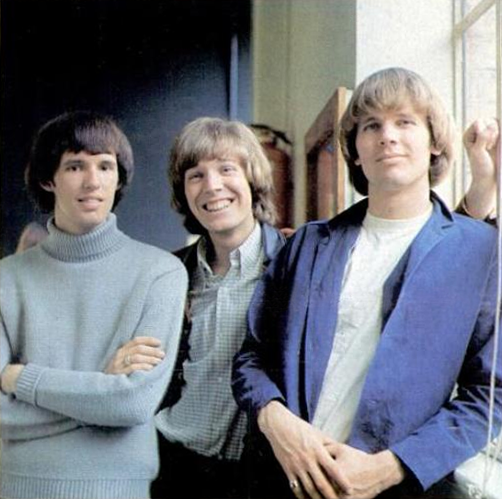
- The Walker Brothers in 1965 (L–R: Gary Leeds, Scott Engel, John Maus)

Background information
- Origin: Los Angeles, California, U.S.
- Genres: Pop; baroque pop; blue-eyed soul; soft rock; country rock; art pop; new wave; avant-pop
- Works: The Walker Brothers discography
- Years active: 1964–1967; 1968; 1975–1978
- Labels: Philips; Smash; GTO
- Past members: Scott Walker; John Walker; Gary Walker

The Walker Brothers were an American pop group formed in Los Angeles in 1964 by John Walker (real name John Maus) and Scott Walker (real name Noel Scott Engel), with Gary Walker (real name Gary Leeds) joining shortly after. They adopted the name "Walker Brothers" as a show business touch, though they were unrelated. After moving to Britain in 1965, they achieved their breakthrough Top 20 single there with "Love Her", and went on have several UK Top 10 albums and Top 40 singles, including the No. 1 hits "Make It Easy on Yourself" and "The Sun Ain't Gonna Shine (Anymore)", both of which also made the US Top 20 and Canadian Top 2. Between them was the UK No. 3 hit "My Ship is Coming In". They provided a unique counterpoint to the British Invasion (a period when British bands such as The Beatles dominated the U.S. charts) by achieving far more success in the UK than in their home country.

The trio split up in mid-1967, though they temporarily reformed for a tour of Japan in early 1968. Over the next eight years, each member pursued solo projects with varying degrees of success. In 1975, they reunited full-time, and scored a final Top 10 UK hit with "No Regrets". After releasing the critically acclaimed but commercially unsuccessful album Nite Flights in 1978, the group again disbanded. John Walker remained active in the music business and toured as a solo act until his death in 2011. Scott Walker resumed his solo career and gained recognition as an avant-garde artist; he died in 2019. Gary Walker died in 2026.

== History ==
=== Formation ===
The Walker Brothers Trio was formed in Los Angeles in 1964 by John Walker (lead vocals, guitar), Scott Engel (bass, harmony vocals), and Al "Tiny" Schneider (drums). Before then, John Walker—who had already been using that name professionally for several years—had performed and recorded several unsuccessful singles with his sister as "John and Judy", and Engel had played bass with instrumental band The Routers. Walker and Engel, with two other musicians, had also toured the Midwest in 1963 as The Surfaris, though the group included none of the musicians who played on the Surfaris' records. Dropping the word Trio, the Walker Brothers were signed by Mercury Records, recorded a single, "Pretty Girls Everywhere", and became a leading attraction at Gazzari's Club in Hollywood. They also appeared on the Shindig! TV show, developed by Jack Good, and then on a weekly TV show, Ninth Street A Go Go.

Late in 1964, they met drummer Gary Leeds, previously of The Standells (late 1962–1964). He had recently toured the UK with singer P.J. Proby. Leeds – along with Gazzari's club regular Brian Jones of The Rolling Stones – persuaded them that the band's rock and roll and blues style would go down well in "swinging London," where Proby had already succeeded. Before leaving, they recorded their second single, "Love Her", overseen by Nick Venet and arranger Jack Nitzsche, with Engel (now Scott Walker) taking the lead vocal part for the first time—previously John had been the lead vocalist. The song had originally been recorded by The Everly Brothers and released as the B-side to their single "The Girl Who Sang The Blues" in 1963. With his distinct baritone, Scott became the group's de facto frontman, and the trio shifted their focus from upbeat R&B to pop ballads that better suited his vocals. They also appeared in a film, Beach Ball, and sent demo recordings to record labels in the United Kingdom.

With Leeds (now Gary Walker) as drummer, and with financial backing from his stepfather, the Walker Brothers travelled to the UK in February 1965 for an exploratory visit.

=== Success in the UK ===
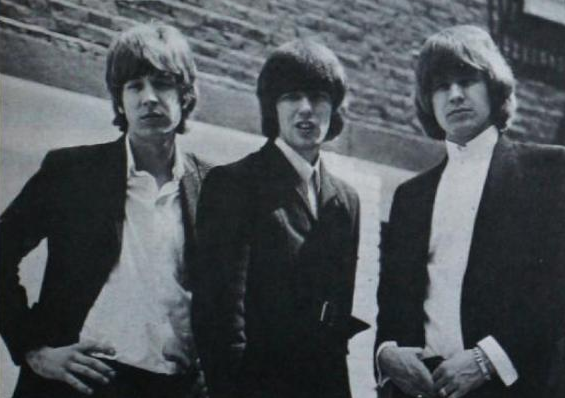
The group in 1965

When the group landed in England, record producer Johnny Franz was keen to sign them up. In a short time, the Walker Brothers had secured a recording contract with Philips Records, an affiliate of Mercury, and had played several UK venues. Along with the group's relocation came a change in image; they abandoned matching suits and pompadours in favour of the mop-top haircuts and casual attire typical of British pop stars. The singles "Pretty Girls Everywhere" and "Love Her" were issued in the UK in early 1965, and while the former had little success, radio stations picked up on the latter and it made the Top 20 in the UK Singles Chart in June 1965.

Philips then released the group's version of "Make It Easy on Yourself," a Burt Bacharach and Hal David ballad previously recorded by Jerry Butler. It was sung by Scott, arranged by Ivor Raymonde and produced by Johnny Franz, with a full orchestra augmented by session musicians. Session musicians on the record included Alan Parker and Big Jim Sullivan. By August 1965, "Make It Easy on Yourself" had entered the UK Top 10, eventually reaching No. 1. Later in the year, it also reached No. 16 in the US Billboard Hot 100. The single sold 250,000 copies in the UK, and over one million copies globally, achieving gold disc status. Around this time, for a number of reasons, John and Scott abandoned playing guitar and bass, respectively, on stage and focused solely on singing, with the Quotations being hired as the Walker Brothers' touring backing group, though Gary continued as drummer.

The No. 3 UK hit "My Ship Is Comin' In", originally recorded in 1965 by soul singer Jimmy Radcliffe, followed. Then in March 1966, the Walker Brothers hit No. 1 for the second time in six months with "The Sun Ain't Gonna Shine Anymore", originally recorded by Frankie Valli the previous year. Their popularity in the UK reached a new high, especially among teenage girls, and their fan club in that country was said to have been larger than the Beatles' fan club at one point in 1966. "The Sun Ain't Gonna Shine Anymore" also made the US Top 20, but ultimately the group would remain far more popular in the UK than in their home country.

Between 1965 and 1967, the group released four albums, Take It Easy with the Walker Brothers (1965), Portrait (1966), Images (1967), and the double compilation The Walker Brothers' Story (1967), as well as two EPs, I Need You and Solo John/Solo Scott (both 1966). Following "The Sun Ain't Gonna Shine Anymore", the group's subsequent singles in 1966 were "(Baby) You Don't Have to Tell Me" (No. 13 UK), "Another Tear Falls" (No. 12 UK) and "Deadlier Than the Male" (No. 32 UK), the latter recorded for the soundtrack of the film of the same name. While Scott and John would often contribute to the songwriting on albums, EPs and single B-sides, "Deadlier Than the Male" is the Walker Brothers' only 1960s single A-side to be written by a member of the group, being a co-write between Scott and producer Johnny Franz. 1967 brought two more singles in "Stay With Me Baby" and "Walking in the Rain" (both of which reached No. 26 in the UK).

During 1966, while the group were at their commercial peak, Gary released two solo singles, "You Don't Love Me" and "Twinkie-Lee", both of which went Top 30 in the UK.

As time went on, Scott took a more prominent role in their song choices and arrangements, but with diminishing commercial success. They also had to leave the UK for six months in 1967 because of work permit problems. As pop music moved on, the Walker Brothers began to sound dated. By early 1967, the pressures of stardom, internal tensions and "artistic differences" began to weaken the group. After a UK tour in April 1967, which also featured Jimi Hendrix, Cat Stevens, and Engelbert Humperdinck, the group officially disbanded, though they temporarily re-formed for a 1968 tour of Japan.

=== Reunion in the 1970s ===
During 1967 to 1974, John and Scott pursued solo careers while Gary formed the band Gary Walker and the Rain. Scott was the most successful, releasing several critically-acclaimed and commercially successful albums, while John scored a minor hit single with "Annabella" in late 1967.

Late in 1974, Scott, John and Gary agreed to re-form as the Walker Brothers. In 1975, they released the album No Regrets. The title track was released as a single and rose to No. 7 on the UK chart in early 1976. The follow up album Lines (1976) was less commercially successful. No Regrets did not include any original songs, while Lines included only one, "First Day", written by John under the pseudonym A. Dayam.

In 1978 the band released their last album Nite Flights, made up entirely of original songs (the first four by Scott, the middle two by Gary and the final four by John), with the dark and avant-garde style of Scott's tracks laying the stylistic groundwork for his subsequent solo work. Nite Flights earned positive reviews, particularly for Scott's tracks, but failed to make any commercial impact. The Walker Brothers did some cabaret performances, although Scott was becoming increasingly reluctant to sing live. The group's contract with GTO Records ended and, according to John, the group "just drifted apart" at the end of 1978.

=== Later activities ===
Interest in the band was briefly revived in 1992 with the issue of the compilation album No Regrets – The Best of Scott Walker and The Walker Brothers 1965–1976, which reached No. 4 in the UK Albums Chart. The following year, David Bowie covered the song "Nite Flights" on his Black Tie White Noise album. 2006 saw the release of the Walker Brothers box set Everything Under the Sun, which included a number of previously unreleased tracks among its five CDs.

John Walker went on to customize guitars and establish his own recording studio in California, and resumed touring in 2004. Scott Walker continued to record sporadically, his music moving further towards the avant-garde, and engage in cultural works, e.g. curating the Meltdown Festival. John and Gary Walker published a joint autobiography, The Walker Brothers: No Regrets — Our Story in 2009 (Scott chose not to participate). John died at his Los Angeles home on May 7, 2011; Scott died in London on March 22, 2019; and Gary died in Essex on March 1, 2026.

"The Sun Ain't Gonna Shine Anymore" and "Stay With Me Baby" were prominently featured in the 2012 film, Seeking a Friend for the End of the World, written and directed by Lorene Scafaria and starring Steve Carell and Keira Knightley.

== Band members ==
- Scott Walker – lead vocals, bass, guitar, keyboards
- John Walker – guitar, vocals
- Gary Walker – drums, vocals

== Discography ==
- Take It Easy with the Walker Brothers (1965)
- Introducing The Walker Brothers (1965, US only)
- I Need You EP (1966)
- Portrait (1966)
- The Sun Ain't Gonna Shine Anymore (1966, US only)
- Solo John/Solo Scott EP (1966)
- Images (1967)
- No Regrets (1975)
- Lines (1976)
- Nite Flights (1978)

== See also ==
- List of performers on Top of the Pops
- List of artists who reached number one on the UK Singles Chart
- UK No.1 Hits of 1965
- UK No.1 Hits of 1966
- Philips Records
- List of number-one singles from the 1960s (UK)
- British Invasion
