= No Regrets (The Walker Brothers album) =

1975 studio album by the Walker Brothers

Studio album by The Walker Brothers
- Released: October 1975
- Recorded: 1975
- Studios: Marquee Studios, Kingsway Recorders and Air London Studios
- Genres: Pop, soft rock, country rock
- Length: 40:34
- Label: GTO
- Producers: Scott Walker, Geoff Calver

The Walker Brothers chronology
Images (1967)	No Regrets (1975)	Lines (1976)

Scott Walker chronology
We Had It All (1974)	No Regrets (1975)	Lines (1976)

Singles from No Regrets
- 1. "No Regrets" Released: November 14, 1975

No Regrets is the fourth album by the American pop group The Walker Brothers. The album was released in 1975 and was the group's first together since 1967. It reached number forty-nine on the UK Albums Chart and includes the single "No Regrets". The single backed with the non-album B-side "Remember Me" became the group's final significant hit single, reaching #7 in the UK Singles Chart in early 1976.

The album was significantly different from the group's 1960s work. While the arrangements were still grandiose and often utilised an orchestra, the general musical styles were Country and Pop music. The album was also their first not to include original compositions by either Scott Walker or John Walker. John Walker's only new song "Remember Me" was included as the B-side to "No Regrets". The group's following album Lines did include a lone John Walker composition under a pseudonym, while Scott would not contribute new songs until 1978's Nite Flights.

== Reception ==
No Regrets received mixed reviews from the majority of critics. Dave Thompson writing retrospectively for Allmusic praised the title track calling it "brilliant" and "a gargantuan slab of maudlin sadness that wrung every last iota of pain from Scott's voice". Thompson criticised the rest of the album saying it "stunk", but did praise "He'll Break Your Heart" and "Burn Our Bridges".

== Track listing ==
Side one
No.	Title	Writer(s)	Length
1.	"No Regrets"	Tom Rush	5:47
2.	"Hold an Old Friend's Hand"	Donna Weiss	3:47
3.	"Boulder to Birmingham"	Bill Danoff, Emmylou Harris	3:55
4.	"Walking in the Sun"	Jeff Barry	3:28
5.	"Lover's Lullaby"	Janis Ian	3:52

Side two
No.	Title	Writer(s)	Length
6.	"Got to Have You"	Kris Kristofferson	3:55
7.	"He'll Break Your Heart"	Curtis Mayfield, Jerry Butler, Calvin Carter	5:10
8.	"Everything That Touches You"	Michael Kamen	4:08
9.	"Lovers"	Mickey Newbury	3:01
10.	"Burn Our Bridges"	Jerry Ragovoy, Linda Laurie	3:31

== Personnel ==
Professional ratings
Review scores
Source	Rating
Allmusic	3.5/5 stars

- John Walker, Judd Proctor, Len Walker, Scott Walker – acoustic guitar
- Alan Parker – acoustic and electric guitar
- Bones (Suzanne Lynch, Brigette du Doit, Janice Slater, Joy Yates) – backing vocals
- Daryl Runswick – bass
- Steve Gray – acoustic piano, string arrangements, conductor
- Barry Morgan – drums
- Dougie Wright – drums, percussion
- Ritchy Hitchcock – electric guitar
- B.J. Cole – pedal steel
- David Katz Orchestra – orchestra
- Chris Karan, Gary Walker – percussion
- Dave MacRae – electric piano

=== Technical ===
- Phil Harding – engineer
- Michael Joseph – photography

== Charts ==
Chart	Position
Australia (Kent Music Report)	39
UK Album Chart	49

== Release details ==
Country	Date	Label	Format	Catalog
United Kingdom	1975	GTO Records	Vinyl	GTLP 007
United Kingdom and Europe	1994	Sony Music Entertainment Inc.	CD	477354–10
Netherlands	1975	Polydor	Vinyl	2321 107
