= The Sun Ain't Gonna Shine (Anymore) =

Song written by Bob Crewe and Bob Gaudio

Single by Frankie Valli

from the album Solo
- B-side: "This Is Goodbye"
- Released: August 1965
- Recorded: July 1965
- Genre: Pop rock
- Length: 3:26
- Label: Smash
- Songwriters: Bob Crewe; Bob Gaudio
- Producer: Bob Crewe

Frankie Valli singles chronology
"Please Take a Chance" (1959)	"The Sun Ain't Gonna Shine (Anymore)" (1965)	"(You're Gonna) Hurt Yourself" (1966)

"The Sun Ain't Gonna Shine (Anymore)" is a song written by Bob Crewe and Bob Gaudio.

It was originally released as a single credited to Frankie Valli as a solo artist in 1965 on the Smash label, but was more successful when recorded by the Walker Brothers in 1966. Cher, Keane, Doug Parkinson and Bruce Springsteen have also recorded the song.

Frankie Valli's single achieved only limited success, charting on Billboard's Bubbling Under Hot 100 singles chart (#128) but not making the Billboard Hot 100 itself. Although it was recorded in a Four Seasons recording session (with the other band members at that time), it was Valli's first official "solo" single since the 1950s.

== The Walker Brothers version ==
"The Sun Ain't Gonna Shine Anymore"

Single by The Walker Brothers

from the album The Sun Ain't Gonna Shine Anymore
- B-side: "After the Lights Go Out"
- Released: 25 February 1966
- Recorded: 9 January 1966
- Studio: Philips Studios, Stanhope Place, London
- Genre: Baroque pop; lounge
- Length: 3:02
- Label: Philips; Smash Records (U.S.)
- Songwriters: Bob Crewe; Bob Gaudio
- Producers: Johnny Franz; Ivor Raymonde

The Walker Brothers singles chronology
"My Ship Is Coming In" (1965)	"The Sun Ain't Gonna Shine Anymore" (1966)	"I Need You EP" (1966)

In 1966, the Walker Brothers released their remake as a single. Re-titled "The Sun Ain't Gonna Shine Anymore", this version met with much greater success than Valli's. It topped the UK Singles Chart, and also became their highest-charting song on the Billboard Hot 100 chart in the U.S., where it peaked at #13. The single also hit the top 10 in Canada, Ireland, Germany, the Netherlands, New Zealand and Norway.

The Walker Brothers' recording has since garnered retrospective critical acclaim, and is considered the group's signature song. NME ranked the song at #357 on its list of the "500 Greatest Songs of All Time", Pitchfork ranked it at #187 on its list of "The 200 Best Songs of the 1960s", and it is listed in the 2010 book 1001 Songs You Must Hear Before You Die.

The video, in which the brothers wander in a mystic garden filled with statues, was not a set; it was Millesgården on the island of Lidingö in Stockholm.

=== Track listing ===
Philips – BF 1473 / Smash Records S-2032
No.	Title	Writer(s)	Length
1.	"The Sun Ain't Gonna Shine Anymore"	Bob Crewe; Bob Gaudio	3:17
2.	"After the Lights Go Out"	John Stewart	4:01

=== Chart positions ===
Chart (1966)	Peak position
Belgium Ultratop singles chart	15
Canadian RPM Top Singles	2
Germany Media Control singles chart	4
Netherlands	9
New Zealand (Listener)	7
Irish Singles Chart	5
Norway VG-lista singles chart	6
UK Singles Chart	1
US Billboard Hot 100	13

== Cher version ==
"The Sun Ain't Gonna Shine Anymore"

Single by Cher

from the album It's a Man's World
- B-side: "Not Enough Love in the World" (Sam Ward Remix)
- Released: August 1996
- Recorded: 1995
- Studio: Elephant Studios (London, England)
- Genre: Pop rock
- Length: 5:13
- Label: WEA
- Songwriters: Bob Crewe; Bob Gaudio
- Producer: Trevor Horn

Cher singles chronology
"Not Enough Love in the World" (1996)	"The Sun Ain't Gonna Shine Anymore" (1996)	"Paradise Is Here" (1996)

Licensed audio
- "The Sun Ain't Gonna Shine Anymore" on YouTube

In 1996, Cher released her remake as the fourth official European single from her twenty-second album, It's a Man's World. The track went to #26 on the UK Singles Chart. Her version was used in The X-Files episode "The Post-Modern Prometheus".

=== Critical reception ===
Allmusic called the song "a real highlight" and added, "epic and beautiful, complete with echoes of the Wild West."

=== Track listing ===
- UK cassette single
1. "The Sun Ain't Gonna Shine Anymore" (Trevor Horn Remix) – 4:02
2. "Not Enough Love in the World" (Sam Ward Remix) – 4:21
- UK CD single
1. "The Sun Ain't Gonna Shine Anymore" (Trevor Horn Remix) – 4:02
2. "Not Enough Love in the World" (Sam Ward Remix) – 4:21
3. "Paradise Is Here" (Album Version) – 5:04
- UK 12" single
1. "The Sun Ain't Gonna Shine Anymore" (Alternative Mix) – 4:02
2. "Not Enough Love in the World" (Sam Ward Remix) – 4:21
3. "Paradise Is Here" (Sam Ward US Mix) – 4:40

=== Charts ===
Chart (1996)	Peak position
Scottish Singles Sales (Official Charts)	15
UK Singles (Official Charts)	26

== Keane version ==
"The Sun Ain't Gonna Shine Anymore"

Single by Keane
- Released: 20 April 2005
- Recorded: Helioscentric Studios, Rye, East Sussex
- Length: 3:31
- Label: War Child music
- Songwriter: Bob Crewe-Bob Gaudio-Tim Rice-Oxley
- Producers: Alex Lake; Nathan Thomas

Keane singles chronology
"This Is the Last Time" (2004)	"The Sun Ain't Gonna Shine Anymore" (2005)	"Bend and Break" (2005)

In 2004, British band Keane recorded the song. Deviating from the original, Tim Rice-Oxley, pianist and composer of Keane, changed the guitar for piano. He also took the lead vocals in the second chorus, like the original version. The single was selected in summer 2004 by readers of the NME and first released as a download-only single in September 2004. It was given for download to the War Child foundation website and one thousand vinyl copies given as a gift to some fans of Keane, who had supported and helped the band. The numbered copies each included a handwritten note from Tim Rice-Oxley, also signed by the other two members, thanking them for their support.

Track listing

1. "The Sun Ain't Gonna Shine Anymore"
2. "Your Eyes Open" (Mo Mental Remix)

== Other versions ==
- Musical group The Ormsby Brothers released a version as a single in 1974, which peaked at #93 in Australia.
- Singer-songwriter Neil Diamond included it as the 9th track of his 1979 LP album September Morn, with Bob Gaudio at the piano.
- Singer Doug Parkinson recorded it with Broderick Smith on his 1981 album Heartbeat To Heartbeat. It was released as a single, peaking at #18 in Australia.
- In 1981, duo Nielsen/Pearson released their remake as a single. It became their last Hot 100 hit, peaking at #56.
- The song was covered by Ute Weber on German disco group Chilly's 1982 album Secret Lies.
- Croatian band Dorian Gray covered it as Sjaj u tami in 1983, and the eponymous song became a hit single in Yugoslavia.
- Musician Russell Hitchcock, the lead vocalist of Air Supply, included it on his eponymous 1988 solo debut album.
- The song features prominently in the 1991 bittersweet romance film Truly, Madly, Deeply, starring Alan Rickman and Juliet Stevenson, with Nina (Stevenson) playing the main chords in the chorus on the piano and Jamie (Rickman) playing the main riff on the bass strings of his cello, and both of them singing. Singing the song is a game the couple often played.
- Singer Jules Shear included a version on his 1994 album The Healing Bones.
- Singer-songwriter Bruce Springsteen recorded the song for his 2022 album Only the Strong Survive.
- The Fuzzy Bunnies, out of New York City, covered it in 1969, reaching #115 on the Hot 100 Bubbling Under Chart.
- In 2025, Jason Kouchak recorded a version to celebrate the song’s 60 year anniversary.

== Usage in media ==
In 1990, in the movie Truly, Madly, Deeply this song was sung as a cover, as well as playing a prominent role in trailer.

In 2010, the Walker Brothers version was used in the promotional trailer for the AMC television series The Walking Dead.

In 2012, the Walker Brothers' rendition played a prominent role in the film Seeking a Friend for the End of the World. It was featured the following year in the film Stoker.

In 2013, the single's B-side, "After the Lights Go Out", played over the end credits of the Canadian-Spanish psychological thriller film Enemy.

In 2018, the Hulu streaming service series Castle Rock used the Walker Brothers' recording in season 1, episode 6.

In 2019, the Frankie Valli version featured during the end credits of the film Midsommar.

In 2026, the Frankie Valli version played over the final scene and early end credits of season 1, episode 2 of the HBO Max television series DTF St. Louis.
