= John Walker (musician) =

American guitarist (1943–2011)

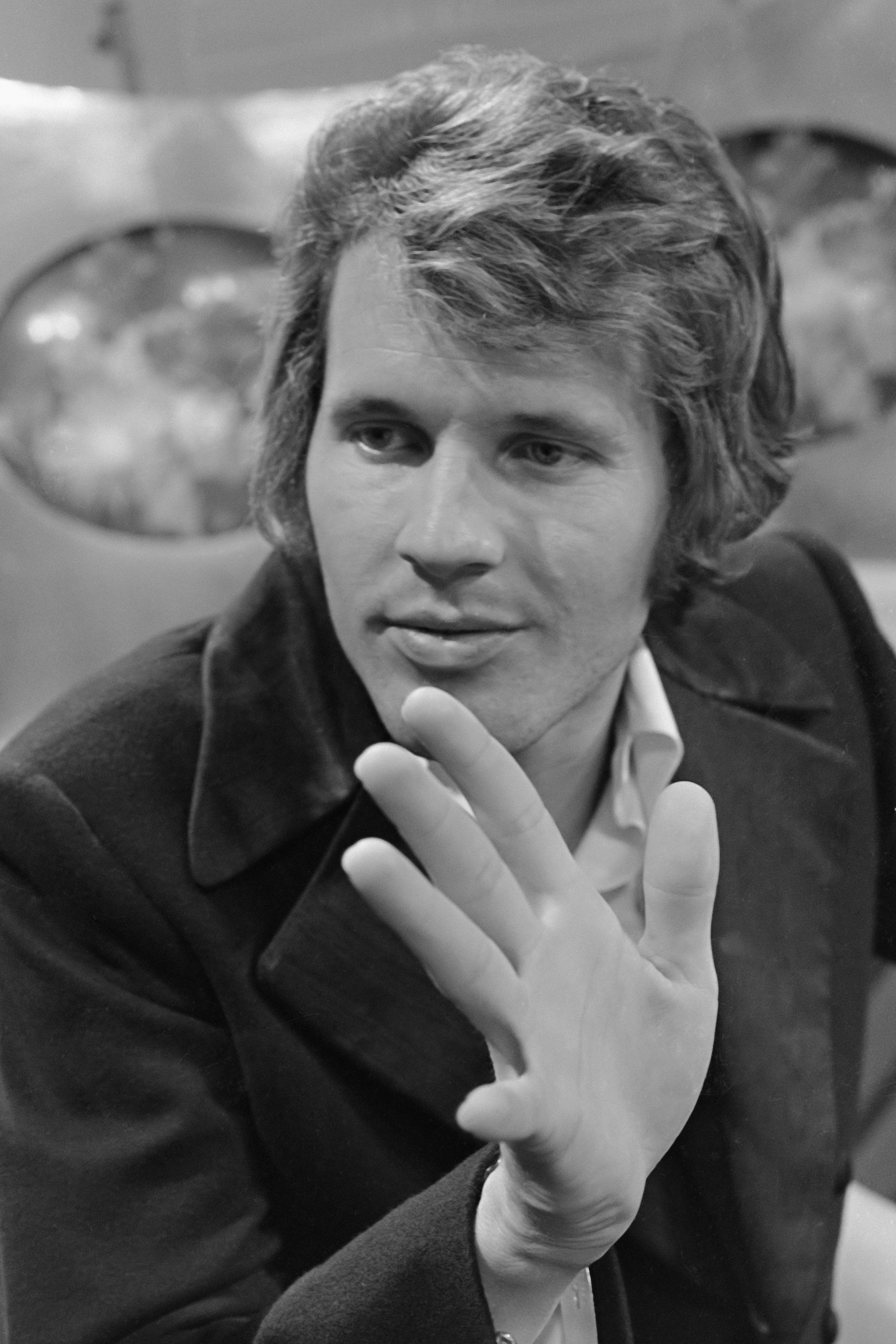
- Walker in 1967

Background information
- Born: John Joseph Maus; November 12, 1943; New York City, U.S.
- Died: May 7, 2011 (aged 67) Los Angeles, California, U.S.
- Genres: Pop
- Occupation: Musician
- Instruments: Guitar; vocals
- Years active: 1957–2011
- Labels: Aladdin; Doré; Almo; Mercury; Philips; GTO; Arena

John Joseph Maus (November 12, 1943 – May 7, 2011), known professionally as John Walker, was an American singer, songwriter and guitarist, best known as the founder of the Walker Brothers, who had their greatest success in the 1960s, particularly in the United Kingdom.

== Early life and career ==
John Maus was born in New York City, the son of John Joseph Maus Sr., who was of German extraction, and his wife Regina. With his parents and his older sister, Judith, he moved to California in 1947, at first settling in Redondo Beach, California and later in Hermosa Beach. He began learning saxophone, clarinet and guitar as a child, and by the age of 11 also began acting and appearing in TV talent shows. He had a role in the sitcom Hello Mom, and small uncredited parts in the movies The Eddy Duchin Story (1956) and The Missouri Traveler (1958). He became a friend of Ritchie Valens, and was an honorary pallbearer at Valens' funeral. In 1959, the family moved again, to Inglewood, California, where he made the acquaintance of future Beach Boys members David Marks and Dennis and Carl Wilson, helping to teach them guitar. He began using the name John Walker at the age of 17, because he was unhappy at how people pronounced his real name.

From 1957 onwards, he worked as singer and guitarist with his sister, as the duo John and Judy. They recorded several singles for the Aladdin, Dore, Arvee and Eldo labels between 1958 and 1962. In 1961, they formed a backing band and performed as John, Judy and the Newports, until the band split up after an engagement in Hawaii. They then met Scott Engel, who had been playing bass in The Routers, and, with drummer "Spider" Webb, formed a new band, Judy and the Gents. Maus obtained an ID card in the name of John Walker, to perform in clubs around Los Angeles while under the legal age to do so. In 1963, Walker and Engel, with two other musicians, toured the Midwest as "The Surfaris", although the group included none of the musicians who played on the Surfaris' records. Walker also released his first solo record, "What a Thrill", on the Almo label, with The Blossoms as backing singers.

== The Walker Brothers ==
He formed The Walker Brothers (originally The Walker Brothers Trio) in 1964, with himself as lead vocalist and guitarist, Engel on bass and harmony vocals, and Al "Tiny" Schneider on drums. Walker and Engel were signed as a duo by Mercury Records, and recorded their first single, "Pretty Girls Everywhere" in Los Angeles. There they became a leading attraction at Gazzari's nightclub, and appeared on the Shindig! TV show developed by Jack Good, and then on a weekly TV show, Ninth Street A Go Go. Late in 1964, they met drummer Gary Leeds, previously of The Standells, who had recently toured the UK with singer P.J. Proby, and who persuaded them that they would have greater success in England. Before leaving, they recorded their second single, "Love Her", overseen by Nick Venet and arranger Jack Nitzsche, with Scott Engel taking the lead vocal part for the first time. With financial backing from Leeds' stepfather, Walker, Engel and Leeds travelled to the UK in February 1965 for an exploratory visit.

In the UK, "Love Her" was released on the Philips label, an affiliate of Mercury, and reached No. 20 on the UK singles chart. Walker and Engel signed a new recording contract, and, with Leeds, began performing live in England, to considerable press attention and with growing numbers of - predominantly female teenage - fans. Their next record, a version of the Bacharach and David song "Make It Easy On Yourself", produced like their other British recordings by Johnny Franz, reached No. 1 in the UK chart in September 1965. Over the next two years the Walker Brothers became – with the Beatles and the Rolling Stones – one of the most popular groups in the country. Their second British number one, "The Sun Ain't Gonna Shine Anymore" in 1966, was their biggest hit in the US, where it made No. 13 on the Billboard Hot 100.

During this period, The Walker Brothers played some performances with the Yardbirds; John eventually sold guitarist Jeff Beck the 1954 Fender Esquire used on many of the Yardbirds' most famous recordings from Spring 1965 to early 1966. Walker had modified the guitar, carving a Stratocaster-type contour in the picking arm area.

John Walker wrote in his autobiographical The Walker Brothers: No Regrets – Our Story:

I was always the leader of the band. I was the one who said 'Let's do this, let's do that.' I spent a great deal of time making sure that the group would make incredible music. Most people don't realise that it was I who chose the songs that would become The Walker Brothers' biggest-selling singles...I was aware that things had changed a lot: Scott had become the lead singer of the group...Now that he was singing lead, I enjoyed the opportunity to create some unusual harmonies, something I had never done before. We knew that we each had an important role, and felt responsible to each other, with one goal in mind, which was to make good records that were unique for the time.

== Later career ==
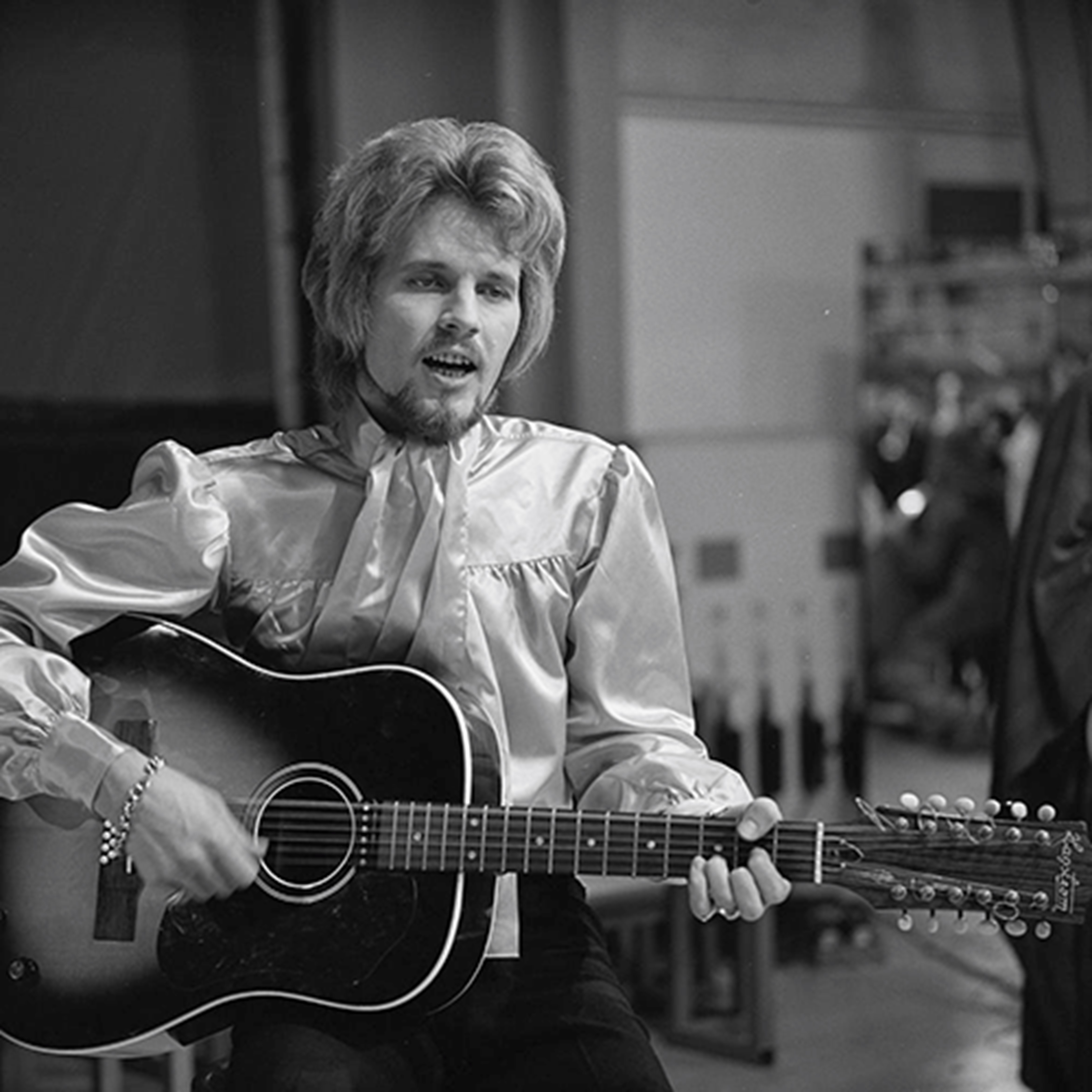
Walker (Dutch TV, 1968)

The Walker Brothers split up in early 1968, principally as a result of tensions between Maus and Engel, after a UK tour in late 1967 which featured Jimi Hendrix, Cat Stevens, and Engelbert Humperdinck, followed by a tour of Japan. John Walker then began performing solo with a backing band. He released the single "Annabella", co-written by Graham Nash, which reached No. 24 on the UK singles chart, and an album, If You Go Away. Later solo singles on Philips, and then on the Carnaby label owned by Mervyn Conn, were less successful, as was a 1969 album, This Is John Walker. In 1971, he recorded an album co-produced by Bill Wyman at the Château d'Hérouville in France, but it was never released. Two years later, he toured briefly with singer Jimmy Wilson and a backing group, as The New Walkers, before they split up.

Late in 1974, he agreed with Engel and Leeds to reform The Walker Brothers. In 1975, they released an album, No Regrets. The title track was taken off as a single and rose to No. 7 on the UK chart in early 1976. They recorded two further albums together, Lines (1976) and Nite Flights (1978), which were less successful. They undertook some cabaret performances, although Engel (by now more usually known as Scott Walker) was reluctant to sing live; the group's contract with GTO Records ended and, according to Walker, the group "just drifted apart".

In 1986, he took part in a 1960s revival tour, before finally moving from England to San Diego. He took an electronics course, and became a technical consultant to manufacturing companies, while developing his own recording studio. He also began writing and composing material, mainly for other artists, and formed his own publishing company, Arena. In 2000, he set up his own record label and released a CD, You. He toured Britain again as part of a nostalgia package tour in 2004, and released an album, Silver Sixties Tour 2004, as well as resuming extensive touring in his own right. In 2007, he released two new CDs, Just For You, a collection of love songs, and Songs of Christmas and Inspiration. He toured the UK again in 2009, as part of an "oldies" package, and in 2010 with the Dakotas, whose original line-up backed Billy J. Kramer in the 1960s.

A dual autobiography, written by Walker and Gary Leeds, The Walker Brothers: No Regrets – Our Story, was published in 2009.

== Personal life ==
Walker was married four times. He married American pop singer Kathy Young in 1965; they divorced in 1968. In 1971 he married Julie Parker-Cann; they divorced a few years later. He married Brandy Nielsen in 1980; they divorced in 2003. In December 2003, he married Cynthia, who sang with him on tour. At the time of his 2009 book, Walker lived in California and had two children and three grandchildren.

In 2010, Walker was diagnosed with liver cancer. He died of the disease, at his Los Angeles home on May 7, 2011.

== Discography ==
=== Singles ===
==== John and Judy ====
"Bother Me Baby" / "Who's To Say" (Aladdin 3420, 1958)
"Hideout" / "Love Bug" (Doré 530, 1959)
"You Can't Have My Love" / "Tell Me" (Doré 540, 1960)
"This Feeling" / "Tell Me Why" (Doré 553, 1960)
"Live It Up" / "Oh No No" (Arvee 5025, 1961)
"I Love You So" / "Love Slave" (Eldo 118, 1961)

==== Johnny Walker ====
"What A Thrill" / "Beginning of the End" (Almo 208, 1964)

==== John Walker ====
Solo John/Solo Scott (Philips, 1966) (Split-EP with Scott Walker) (UK EP No. 4)
"Annabella" / "You Don't Understand Me" (Philips BF 1593, 1967) (UK No. 24)
"If I Promise" / "I See Love In You" (Philips BF 1612, 1967) (UK No. 56) (Note: Chart position is from the official UK "Breakers List".)
"I'll Be Your Baby Tonight" / "Open The Door Homer" (Philips BF 1655, 1968)
"Kentucky Woman" / "I Cried All The Way Home" (Philips BF 1676, 1968)
"Woman" / "A Dream" (Philips BF 1724, 1968)
"Yesterday's Sunshine" / "Little One" (Philips BF 1758, 1968)
"Everywhere Under The Sun" / "Traces Of Tomorrow" (Carnaby CNS 4004, 1969)
"True Grit" / "Sun Comes Up" (Carnaby CNS 4009, 1969)
"Cottonfields" / "Jamie" (Carnaby CNS 4012, 1970)
"Over And Over Again" / "Sun Comes Up" (Carnaby CNS 4017, 1970)
"Huellas de Manana" / "Quienes Somos Nosotros" (Carnaby, 1970)
"Good Days" / "Midnight Morning" (1973)

=== Albums ===
If You Go Away (Philips BL 7829, 1967)
This Is John Walker (Carnaby CNLS 6001, 1969)
You (2000)
The Silver Sixties Tour 2004 (2004)
Just for You (2007)
Songs of Christmas and Inspiration (2007)
Golden Dreams (2012)
