= Johnny Franz =

English record producer (1922–1977)

- Born: John Charles Franz; 23 February 1922; Holloway, London, England
- Died: 29 January 1977 (aged 54) Chelsea, London, England
- Occupations: Pianist, arranger, record producer
- Years active: Late 1940s–1970s
- Labels: Philips

John Charles Franz (23 February 1922 – 29 January 1977) was an English record producer and A&R man at the Philips label. He was one of Britain's most successful producers in the 1950s and 1960s. While his recordings encompassed several forms of mainstream popular music, his most enduring contributions were to British pop music of the mid-1960s on records by Dusty Springfield, the Walker Brothers, and the early solo recordings of Scott Walker. From 1973, he was responsible for the production of Peters & Lee recordings, which included their No. 1 chart hit "Welcome Home".

== Early life ==
Franz was born in Holloway, London, England. His younger brother, Harold, worked as a promotion man for EMI Music Publishing.

== Career ==
Franz learned piano from the age of 13, before joining the music publishers Francis, Day & Hunter two years later as an office boy in Denmark Street, the British equivalent of Tin Pan Alley. While doing this, he worked with Jack Jackson, Nat Allen and George Elrick as a club pianist in British dance bands. Franz also appeared on radio with harmonica player Ronald Chesney as Chesney's accompanist. By the late 1940s, Franz was regarded as one of Britain's top accompanists, working with singers such as Anne Shelton, Benny Lee, Adelaide Hall and visiting American performer Vivian Blaine.

He also worked as a BBC orchestrator before becoming the head of A&R at Philips Records in 1954. Franz went on to produce for many prolific British artists for the label, including Shirley Bassey, the Beverley Sisters, Frankie Vaughan, Robert Earl, Susan Maughan, Marty Wilde, Ronnie Carroll, Harry Secombe, Winifred Atwell, the Springfields, the Four Pennies, Julie Rogers, Peters and Lee, Dusty Springfield, Anne Shelton, and the Walker Brothers in the 1960s, as well as American singers who recorded in Britain, such as Mel Tormé. He also worked with some American artists under license from Columbia Records, such as Johnnie Ray, Doris Day and Rosemary Clooney. Franz's production trademarks were a lush choir and big orchestras, provided by Wally Stott, Ivor Raymonde and Peter Knight.

Franz oversaw discs that matched first-class pop rock material and vocalists with the sort of orchestral production that was more typical of middle of the road pop. Franz's role with these artists seemed not to have been so much that of an innovator as one of a capable delegator. For Dusty Springfield's first solo record in 1963, "I Only Want to Be with You", and the many that followed – which were the best British equivalents to Phil Spector's Wall of Sound – he relied heavily upon arranger Ivor Raymonde, who also co-wrote "I Only Want to Be with You". Raymonde did some work on Walker Brothers hits (like "Make It Easy on Yourself"), which were aided by engineer Peter Olliff. The more classical sounding Walker Brothers arrangements were frequently handled by Reg Guest.

Franz and Olliff continued to work with Scott Walker on the singer's early solo albums, in which he developed a more serious and sombre approach to both repertoire and vocals. Walker and Franz were personal friends, and Franz arranged for Walker to study with British vocal instructor Freddie Winrose, who taught the singer much about breath control. However, Franz could not continue working with Walker after the singer left Philips to sign with CBS Records in 1973, except to give valuable advice.

== Personal life and death ==
On 19 February 1954, Franz married Ann Fairbrother, a fellow pianist, at Caxton Hall in Westminster, London. He subsequently married his secretary, Moira Creamer, in 1965.

Franz would consume copious cups of tea and cigarettes at any time of day, but especially during recording sessions. He was proud of his Rolls-Royce car, which he bought from Philips artist Harry Secombe. Franz lived in Hampstead Garden Suburb, north west London.

Franz, who was known as the "last of the great pros", died of a heart attack in 1977 whilst in London's Brompton Hospital, at the age of 54. A memorial service was held for him at St Martin-in-the-Fields soon afterwards.

== Selected production credits ==
Franz produced ten UK number ones, enjoying, in total, twenty eight weeks at the top of the UK Singles Chart. These were:

- "Let's Have Another Party" – Winifred Atwell (1954)
- "Lay Down Your Arms" – Anne Shelton (1956)
- "The Garden of Eden" – Frankie Vaughan (1957)
- "As I Love You" – Shirley Bassey (1959)
- "Tower of Strength" – Frankie Vaughan (1961)
- "Juliet" – The Four Pennies (1964)
- "Make It Easy on Yourself" – The Walker Brothers (1965)
- "The Sun Ain't Gonna Shine Anymore" – The Walker Brothers (1966)
- "You Don't Have to Say You Love Me" – Dusty Springfield (1966)
- "Welcome Home" – Peters and Lee (1973)
