= Spivey Records =

Spivey Records was a specialist blues record label founded by blues singer Victoria Spivey and jazz historian Len Kunstadt in 1961. The Records has released a series of blues and jazz albums between 1961 and 1985.

== History of Spivey Records ==
The label recorded a wide variety of blues musicians who were friends of Spivey and Kunstadt, including Muddy Waters, Otis Spann, Big Joe Williams, Lonnie Johnson, Memphis Slim, and Louis Armstrong. Kunstadt had a rough and ready approach to recording; he was known to walk through the session and shout "More mistakes!"

On March 2, 1962, Bob Dylan contributed harmonica and backing vocals to a recording session featuring Big Joe Williams. These tracks appeared on Spivey LP 1004, Three Kings And The Queen. However, this was not Dylan's first recording session. He had already recorded his debut album Bob Dylan for Columbia Records, which was released on March 19, 1962.

In recognition of her entrepreneurial achievements with Spivey Records, Spivey was awarded the "BMI Commendation of Excellence" in 1970.

Victoria Spivey died in 1976. The label became dormant after the death of Len Kunstadt in 1996.

In 2007, Len Kunstadt's niece, Lisa Weiner, announced the revival of the label on the Spivey Records website. It was announced that audio engineer Doug Pomeroy had remastered the original tapes recorded between 1961 and 1986, and that Spivey LP1001 through Spivey LP1016 would be reissued on CD in 2008. Queries on the notice board of Spivey Records website indicate that as of October 2011, no reissued CDs are currently available.

== Albums released by Spivey Records ==
- Buddy Tate Invites You "To Dig" A Basket Of Blues (1962) (Spivey LP 1001)

Buddy Tate Band; Hannah Sylvester; Lucille Hegamin; Victoria Spivey

- Victoria Spivey And Her Blues (1962) (Spivey LP 1002)

Victoria Spivey

- Chicago Blues: A Bonanza All Star Blues LP (1962) (Spivey LP 1003)

Big Willie Dixon; Sunnyland Slim; John Henry Barbee; Homesick James; St Louis Jimmy; Washboard Sam; Cocoa (Aka "Koko") Taylor; Evans Spencer

- Three Kings And The Queen (1962) (Spivey LP 1004)

Roosevelt Sykes; Lonnie Johnson; Big Joe Williams (with Bob Dylan); Victoria Spivey

- Missippi Mr Shortstuff (1964) (Spivey LP 1005)

Big Joe Williams

- The Queen And Her Knights (1965) (Spivey LP 1006)

Victoria Spivey; Memphis Slim; Little Brother Montgomery; Lonnie Johnson

- Louis Metcalf At The Ali Baba (1966) (Spivey LP 1007)

Louis Metcalf; Sonny White; Jerome Patterson; Al Matthews; Struttin' Sam; Victoria Spivey

- The Bluesmen Of The Muddy Waters Chicago Blues Band (1966) (Spivey LP 1008)

Otis Spann; George Smith; Luther "Guitar Junior" Johnson; Sammy Lawhorn; Francis Clay

- Encore For The Chicago Blues (1968) (Spivey LP 1009)

Muddy Waters Bluesmen; Harvey Hill; Koko Taylor; Memphis Slim; Babe Stovall; Big Joe Williams; Oliver Brown; J. B. Lenoir; Washboard Sam's Band; Victoria Spivey; Willie Dixon; John Hammond; John Henry Barbee; Viola Wells; Homesick James; Roosevelt Sykes

- The Bluesmen Of The Muddy Waters Blues Band, Volume 2 (1968) (Spivey LP 1010)

Otis Spann; Lucille Spann; Luther "Guitar Junior" Johnson; Sammy Lawhorn; Little Sonny Wimberley; S.P. Leary; Paul Oscher; Pee Wee Madison; Willie Smith

- Victoria Spivey Presents The All Star Blues World Of Spivey Records In Stereo (1970) (Spivey LP 1011)

Roosevelt Sykes; John Hammond; Victoria Spivey; Smokey Hogg; Washboard Doc; Smokey Hogg; Willie Dixon; Sunnyland Slim; Marie Dixon; Johnny Shines

- Spivey's Blues Parade (1970) (Spivey LP 1012)

Spivey's Blues Paraders: Bill Dicey, John Hammond, Bob Malenky, Roosevelt Sykes & Washboard Doc: Benny Jefferson; Pat Blackman; Sugar Blue & His Harmonica; Sippie Wallace; Billie Mitchell; Walter "Shakey" Horton, Sunnyland Slim & Johnny Shines; Victoria Spivey, Lonnie Johnson, Little Brother Montgomery & Sonny Greer; Carolina Rose; Sonny Boy Williamson; Nita Washington; Washboard Bill; Little Sonny Parker; Delsey Maccay, Horton & Sunnyland Slim; Papa Comb & His Ukulele Mama; Lonnie Johnson

- The Everlasting Blues vs. Otis Spann (1969) (Spivey LP 1013)

Otis Spann; Johnny Young; Luther "Guitar Junior" Johnson; Peter Malick; S.P. Leary

- Three Kings And The Queen, Volume Two (1970) (Spivey LP 1014)

Memphis Slim; Lonnie Johnson; Roosevelt Sykes; Victoria Spivey, Big Joe Williams and Bob Dylan; Big Joe Williams; Roosevelt Sykes and John Hammond; Victoria Spivey and Bob Dylan.

- Spivey's Blues Cavalcade (1970) (Spivey LP 1015)

Bill Dicey's High Street Blues Band; Larry Johnson; Brooklyn Blues Busters; Danny Russo; Washboard Bill; Ted Stilles; Homesick James; Mark Ross & John Brenner; John Hammond; Johnny Shines, Big Walter Horton and Sunshine Slim; Bukka White; Bill Dicey and Sugar Blue; Ralph Rush; Harvey Hill; Ted Stilles; Louisiana Red; Victoria Spivey.

- The All Star Blues World Of Maestro Willie Dixon and his Chicago Blues Band (1973) (Spivey LP 1016)

Willie Dixon Band; Buster Benton; Lafayette Leake; Larry Johnson; Carey Bell; Larry Johnson; Victoria Spivey.

- I'm Gonna Sit Right Down And Write Myself A Letter (1978) (Spivey LP 1020)

Big Joe Turner Lloyd Glenn, Brenda Bell, Robert Ross, Bill Dicey, Washboard Doc

- New York Really Has The Blues

Victoria Spivey, Paul Oscher, Sugar Blue, Washboard Doc, Charles "Honeyboy" Otis, Smokey Hogg, The Dicey Ross Band featuring Bill Dicey and Robert Ross

- What Is The Blues (1977) (Spivey LP 1022)

Eunice Davis and the Spivey Low-Down Blues Privacy Invaders with Bill Dicey, Robert Ross, Jonathan Dreschler, Georges Morales, Andy Story, Washboard Doc

- Victoria Spivey and her Danny Boy (1977) (Spivey LP 1023)

Victoria Spivey with Danny Russo plus Lefty Dizz and Larry Johnson

== See also ==
- List of record labels
