= Victoria Spivey =

American blues singer and songwriter (1906–1976)

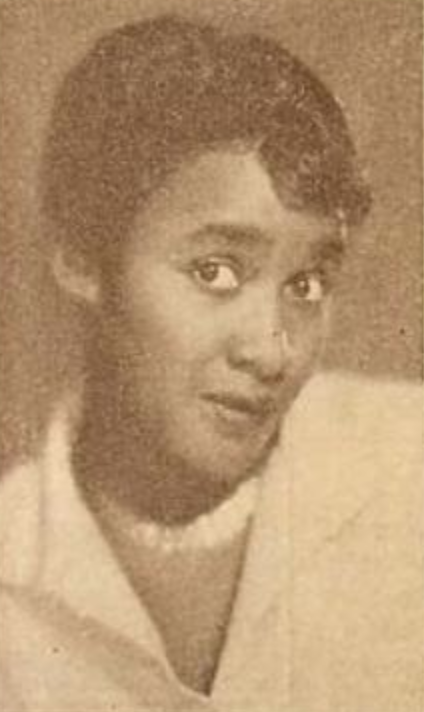
- Victoria Spivey, from a 1929 publication

Background information
- Born: Victoria Regina Spivey; October 15, 1906; Houston, Texas, U.S.
- Died: October 3, 1976 (aged 69) New York City
- Genre: Blues
- Occupations: Musician, singer, songwriter
- Instruments: Vocals, piano
- Labels: Okeh; RCA Victor; Vocalion; Decca; Prestige Bluesville; Spivey

Victoria Regina Spivey (October 15, 1906 – October 3, 1976), sometimes known as Queen Victoria, was an American blues singer, songwriter, and record company founder. During a recording career that spanned 40 years, from 1926 to the mid-1960s, she worked with Louis Armstrong, King Oliver, Clarence Williams, Luis Russell, Lonnie Johnson, and Bob Dylan. She also performed in vaudeville and clubs, sometimes with her sisters Addie "Sweet Peas" (or "Sweet Pease") Spivey and Elton Island Spivey (also known as the Za Zu Girl). Among her compositions are "Black Snake Blues" (1926), "Dope Head Blues" (1927), and "Organ Grinder Blues" (1928). In 1961, she co-founded Spivey Records with one of her husbands, Len Kunstadt. Her recordings are considered important examples of classic female blues, and scholars note that her music reflected the themes and performance styles that were common among major women blues artists of the 1920s and 1930s.

== Early life ==
Born in Houston, Texas, she was the daughter of Grant and Addie (Smith) Spivey. Her father was a part-time musician and a flagman for the railroad; her mother was a nurse. She had three sisters, all three of whom also sang professionally: Leona, Elton "Za Zu" (August 12, 1900 – June 25, 1971), and Addie "Sweet Peas" (or "Sweet Pease") Spivey (August 22, 1910 – 1943), who recorded for several major record labels between 1929 and 1937. She married four times; her husbands included Ruben Floyd, Billy Adams, and Len Kunstadt, with whom she co-founded Spivey Records in 1961. Scholars describe her as an important voice in early urban and classic female blues, known for her expressive singing and strong use of storytelling.

According to the Handbook of Texas Online, Spivey's early musical development began in Houston, where she performed with her family's string band and learned songs common in local Black musical communities. The African American Registry notes that she showed musical talent at an early age, singing, playing piano, and adapting to a variety of performance settings.

Spivey's first professional experience was in a family string band led by her father in Houston. After he died, the seven-year-old Victoria played on her own at local parties. In 1918, she was hired to accompany films at the Lincoln Theater in Dallas. As a teenager, she worked in local bars, nightclubs, and buffet flats, mostly alone, but occasionally with singer-guitarists, including Blind Lemon Jefferson.

== Recording career (1920s–1940s) ==
In 1926 she moved to St. Louis, Missouri, where she was signed by Okeh Records. Her first recording, "Black Snake Blues" (1926), sold well, and her association with the label continued. She recorded numerous sides for Okeh in New York City until 1929, when she switched to the Victor label. Between 1931 and 1937, more recordings followed for Vocalion Records and Decca Records, and, working out of New York, she maintained an active performance schedule. Her recorded accompanists included King Oliver, Charles Avery, Louis Armstrong, Lonnie Johnson, and Red Allen.

According to the Encyclopedia of the Blues, they identify Spivey as one of Okeh's most notable female blues artists. Her recordings from the 1920s, including "Black Snake Blues," "Dope Head Blues," and "Organ Grinder Blues," featured bold subject matter and direct lyrical style. Phil Hardy and Dave Laing describes her performances as energetic and confident, noting that she often used humor and emotional phrasing to shape the meaning of her songs.

== Film and stage work ==
The Depression did not put an end to Spivey's musical career. She found a new outlet for her talent in 1929, when the film director King Vidor cast her to play Missy Rose in his first sound film, Hallelujah!. Through the 1930s and 1940s Spivey continued to work in musical films and stage shows, including the hit musical Hellzapoppin (1938), often with her husband, the vaudeville dancer Billy Adams.

== Retirement and comeback (1950s–1960s) ==
In 1951, Spivey retired from show business to play the pipe organ and lead a church choir, but she returned to secular music in 1961, when she was reunited with an old singing partner, Lonnie Johnson, to appear on four tracks on his Prestige Bluesville album Idle Hours.

The folk music revival of the 1960s gave her further opportunities to make a comeback. She recorded again for Prestige Bluesville, sharing an album, Songs We Taught Your Mother, with fellow veterans Alberta Hunter and Lucille Hegamin, and began making personal appearances at festivals and clubs, including the 1963 European tour of the American Folk Blues Festival.

== Spivey Records ==
In 1961, Spivey and the jazz and blues historian Len Kunstadt launched Spivey Records, a low-budget label dedicated to blues, jazz, and related music, prolifically recording established artists, including Sippie Wallace, Lucille Hegamin, Otis Rush, Otis Spann, Willie Dixon, Roosevelt Sykes, Big Joe Turner, Buddy Tate, and Hannah Sylvester, and also newer artists, including Luther "Guitar Junior" Johnson, Brenda Bell, Washboard Doc, Bill Dicey, Robert Ross, Sugar Blue, Paul Oscher, Danny Russo, and Larry Johnson.

The Blues Hall of Fame notes that Spivey Records played an important role in preserving the work of older blues musicians during a period when opportunities for them were limited. The label also provided recording experience for younger artists, including Bob Dylan, helping connect different generations of blues performers.

Spivey also hosted a column entitled "Blues Is My Business" in Len Kundstadt's magazine Record Research from 1962 to 1970. Notably, Spivey disputes the peaceful exchange between herself and Blind Lemon Jefferson over his recording of "Black Snake Moan" just months after her recording "Black Snake Blues". While many descriptions of "Black Snake Moan" cite Spivey as inspiration for Jefferson's recording, her account reveals the interaction to be more in line with the kind of erasure black women performers of this era experienced.

"According to the 1976 Spivey obituary published in The Black Perspective in Music, Spivey's songs addressed themes related to daily life, relationships, and social conditions faced by African American women. Her work is often discussed as an important example of the expressive and narrative traditions that shaped early blues.

In March 1962, Spivey and Big Joe Williams recorded for Spivey Records, with harmonica accompaniment and backup vocals by Bob Dylan. The recordings were released on Three Kings and the Queen (Spivey LP 1004) and Kings and the Queen Volume Two (Spivey LP 1014). Dylan was listed under his own name on the record covers. A picture of her and Dylan from this period is shown on the back cover of the Dylan album, New Morning. In 1964, Spivey made her only recording with an all-white band, the Connecticut-based Easy Riders Jazz Band, led by the trombonist Big Bill Bissonnette. It was released first on an LP and later re-released on compact disc.

== Musical style ==
Spivey's musical style combined elements of classic female blues, vaudeville, and early urban blues. Her vocals were known for strong projection, expressive timing, and clear storytelling. She often used direct or humorous language, addressing themes not commonly heard in commercial recordings of the 1920s.

The 1976 Spivey obituary published in The Black Perspective in Music notes that her lyrics reflected everyday life and the experiences of African American women, showing both independence and emotional depth. In The Faber Companion to 20th-Century Popular Music, it describes her stage presence as energetic and engaging.

== Legacy ==
Spivey is recognized as an important figure in blues history. The Blues Hall of Fame cites both her long performing career and her role in preserving blues traditions through Spivey Records.

Her work during the 1960s blues revival connected younger musicians, including Bob Dylan, to earlier blues styles.

Scholars also note that she helped define the themes and vocal approach of classic female blues, and her recordings continue to be discussed in studies of African American music and women's history.

== Honors and recognition ==
Victoria Spivey was inducted into the Blues Hall of Fame in 1986.

Spivey died in New York on October 3, 1976, at the age of 69, from an internal hemorrhage.

== Selected discography ==
=== Albums ===
- Idle Hours (Bluesville, 1961) with Lonnie Johnson (three tracks)
- Songs We Taught Your Mother (Bluesville, 1962) shared album with Alberta Hunter and Lucille Hegamin (four tracks)
- Woman Blues! (Bluesville, 1962) with Lonnie Johnson
- A Basket of Blues (Spivey, 1962) shared album with Buddy Terry, Lucille Hegamin and Hannah Sylvester
- Victoria and Her Blues (Spivey, 1962)
- Three Kings and the Queen (Spivey, 1964) shared album with Roosevelt Sykes, Big Joe Williams and Lonnie Johnson
- The Queen and Her Knights (Spivey, 1965) shared album with Lonnie Johnson, Little Brother Montgomery, Memphis Slim and Sonny Greer
- Music Down Home: An Introduction to Negro Folk Music, U.S.A. (1965)
- The Blues Is Life (1976)
- Classic Piano Blues from Smithsonian Folkways (2008)

=== 78 rpm singles – Okeh Records ===
8338A	Victoria Spivey	"Black Snake Blues"	May 5, 1926
8338B	Victoria Spivey	"No More Jelly Bean Blues"	May 11, 1926
8351A	Victoria Spivey	"Dirty Woman's Blues"	May 5, 1926
8351B	Victoria Spivey	"Long Gone Blues"	May 5, 1926
8370A	Victoria Spivey	"Spider Web Blues"	August 12, 1926
8370B	Victoria Spivey	"Hoodoo Man Blues"	August 11, 1926
8389A	Victoria Spivey	"Humored and Petted Blues"	August 12, 1926
8389B	Victoria Spivey	"Blue Valley Blues"	August 16, 1926
8401A	Victoria Spivey	"Big Houston Blues"	August 13, 1926
8401B	Victoria Spivey	"Got the Blues So Bad"	August 13, 1926
8410A	Victoria Spivey	"Its Evil Hearted Me"	August 12, 1926
8410B	Victoria Spivey	"Santa Fe Blues"	August 12, 1926
8464	Victoria Spivey	"Idle Hour Blues"	April 27, 1927
8464	Victoria Spivey	"Steady Grind"	April 27, 1927
8481	Victoria Spivey	"Arkansas Road Blues"	April 27, 1927
8481	Victoria Spivey	"Alligator Pond Went Dry"	April 27, 1927
8494	Victoria Spivey	"No. 12 Let Me Roam"	April 27, 1927
8494	Victoria Spivey	"T.B Blues (West End Blues)"	April 27, 1927
8517	Victoria Spivey	"Christmas Morning Blues"	October 28, 1927
8517	Victoria Spivey	"Garter Snake Blues"	October 28, 1927
8531	Victoria Spivey with Lonnie Johnson	"Dope Head Blues"	October 28, 1927
8531	Victoria Spivey	"Blood Thirsty Blues"	October 31, 1927
8550	Victoria Spivey	"Jelly Look What You Done Done"	November 1, 1927
8550	Victoria Spivey	"Red Lantern Blues"	October 28, 1927
8565	Victoria Spivey	"A Good Man is Hard to Find"	November 1, 1927
8565	Victoria Spivey	"Your Worries Ain't Like Mine"	November 1, 1927
8581	Victoria Spivey	"Nightmare Blues"	October 31, 1927
8581	Victoria Spivey	"Murder in the First Degree"	October 31, 1927
8615	Victoria Spivey	"My Handy Man"	September 12, 1928
8615	Victoria Spivey	"Organ Grinder Blues"	September 12, 1928
8626	Victoria Spivey	"New Black Snake Blues Part 2"	October 13, 1928
8626	Victoria Spivey	"New Black Snake Blues"	October 13, 1928
8634	Victoria Spivey	"No Papa No"	October 17, 1928
8634	Victoria Spivey	"Mosquito Fly and Flea"	October 18, 1928
8652	Victoria Spivey/Lonnie Johnson	"Furniture Man #2 Blues"	October 18, 1928
8652	Victoria Spivey	"Furniture Man Blues"	October 18, 1928
8713	Victoria Spivey	"How Do They Do It That Way"	July 10, 1929
8713	Victoria Spivey	"Funny Feathers"	July 10, 1929
8733	Victoria Spivey	"You Done Lost Your Good Thing Now"	July 3, 1929
8744A	Lonnie Johnson/Victoria Spivey	"Toothache Blues"	October 17, 1928
8744B	Lonnie Johnson/Victoria Spivey	"Toothache Blues #2"	October 18, 1928

=== 78 rpm singles - Victor Records ===
23349	Victoria Spivey	"Baulin Water Blues"	June 26, 1930
23349	Victoria Spivey	"Baulin Water Blues" (second version)	June 26, 1930
38546	Victoria Spivey	"Moaning the Blues"	October 1, 1929
38546	Victoria Spivey	"Telephoning the Blues"	October 1, 1929
38570	Victoria Spivey	"Bloodhound Blues"	October 1, 1929
38570	Victoria Spivey	"Dirty Tee Be Blues"	October 1, 1929
38584	Victoria Spivey	"New York Blues"	February 4, 1930
38584	Victoria Spivey	"Showered With the Blues"	February 4, 1930
38598	Victoria Spivey	"Haunted by the Blues"	February 4, 1930
38598	Victoria Spivey	"Lonesome With the Blues"	February 4, 1930
38609	Victoria Spivey	"You've Gotta Have What It Takes"	June 26, 1930
38609	Victoria Spivey	"You've Gotta Have What It Takes" (second version)	June 26, 1930

== See also ==
- Classic female blues
- List of blues musicians
- List of classic female blues singers
- List of country blues musicians
- List of vaudeville performers: L–Z
- Spivey Records

== Bibliography ==
- Cohn, Lawrence, ed. (1993). Nothing but the Blues: The Music and the Musicians. New York: Abbeville Publishing Group. ISBN 1-55859-271-7.
- The Blues Foundation. (2019, December 9). Victoria Spivey. Blues Hall of Fame
