= Robert Ross (blues singer) =

American blues singer and musician

Robert Ross is an American blues singer, songwriter, acoustic and electric guitarist, slide guitarist, and harmonica player. He is the leader of the Robert Ross Band and The Jazz-Manian Devils. He also performs as a solo artist.

He was born in Brooklyn, New York, United States. Ross was nominated seven times for a New York Music Award and has won twice, once for Best Blues Artist in 1989, and once for Best Live Blues Artist in 2011. Ross was inducted into the New York Blues Hall of Fame in 2011. He has also won several grants for integrating music into education programs. Ross' original song, "Sittin' in the Jailhouse", was recorded in 1980 by Johnny Winter and appeared on Winter's album, Raisin' Cain and Winter's compilation, A Rock 'n' Roll Collection.

As co-leader of the Dicey Ross Band with harmonica player Bill Dicey, Ross recorded with Big Joe Turner in 1976 for Spivey Records. Ross has also worked with John Lee Hooker, Lightnin' Hopkins, Brownie McGhee, Memphis Slim, Sunnyland Slim, Otis Rush, Dr. John, Bobby Lewis, Pinetop Perkins, Cyril Neville, Big Mama Thornton, Louisiana Red, J. B. Hutto, Eddie Kirkland, Floyd Jones, and Homesick James. The Robert Ross Band tours frequently and has released seven recordings including two albums in Europe on Brambus Records.

in 2020, Ross was a semi-finalist at the International Blues Challenge.

Ross' diverse repertory includes boogie woogie, soul, blues, rock and roll and jazz.

== Discography ==
- When You Needed Me by The City Boys Allstars featuring Ross singing his original song, "Last Night the Bottle Let Me Down" (2012)
- What Are We Fighting For? by Robert Ross on Fountainbleu Records (2004)
- Sleight of Hand by Robert Ross Band on Fountainbleu Records (2002)
- Lightness....To Dark (USA title: It's Alive on Blue Planet Records) on Brambus Records (1999) by Robert Ross
- Darkness....to Light on Brambus Records (1996), and in USA on Blue Planet Records by Robert Ross
- Rockin' The Rails on Blue Planet Records (1992) by Robert Ross Band
- It's Rough 'n' Tough on RCA / Victoria Records (1984) by Robert Ross
- Introducing Robert Ross (EP) on Baron Records (1981)
- I'm Gonna Sit Right Down And Write Myself A Letter with Big Joe Turner on Spivey Records (1978)
- What Is The Blues (LP-1022) with Eunice Davis on Spivey Records (1977). Credited as "Bob" Ross
- New York Really Has The Blues (LP-1018) with Victoria Spivey, Dicey Ross Band (featuring Robert Ross), Washboard Doc, Sugar Blue, Brooklyn Slim (Paul Oscher) on Spivey Records (1976)
