= Luther "Georgia Boy" Johnson =

American blues guitarist, singer and songwriter (1934–1976)

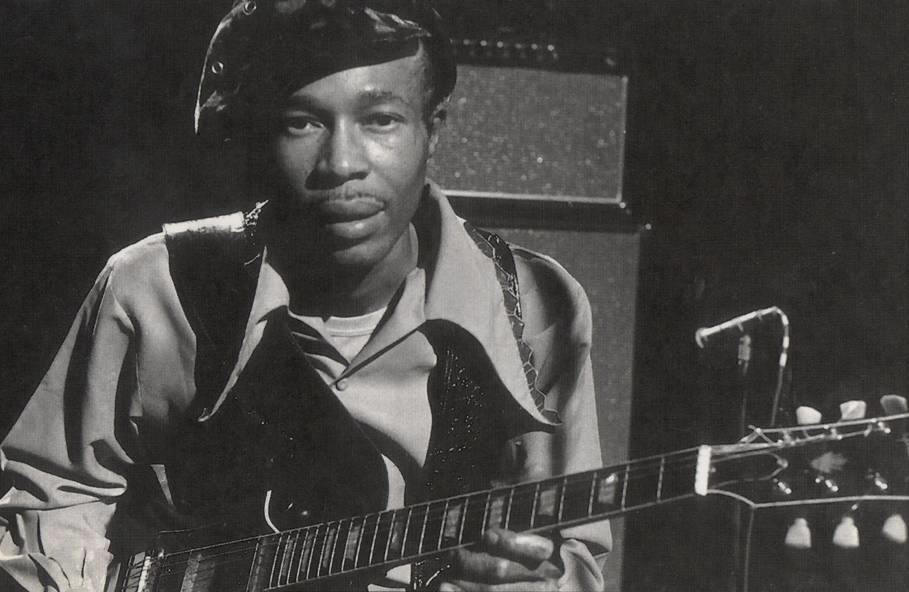

Background information
- Also known as: Luther "Snake" Johnson
- Born: Lucious Brinson Johnson; August 30, 1934; Davisboro, Georgia, U.S.
- Died: March 18, 1976 (aged 41) Boston, Massachusetts, U.S.
- Genres: Chicago blues; electric blues
- Occupations: Musician; songwriter
- Instruments: Guitar; vocals
- Years active: 1950s–1976
- Labels: Black & Blue; Muse

Lucious Brinson Johnson (August 30, 1934 – March 18, 1976), known as Luther "Georgia Boy" Johnson, was an American Chicago blues and electric blues guitarist, singer and songwriter. AllMusic journalist Ron Wynn stated, "Johnson's own inimitable vocals, raspy lines and tart guitar eventually create his own aura ... a good, occasionally outstanding blues artist."

== Life and career ==
Johnson was born Lucious Brinson Johnson in Davisboro, Georgia. He was raised on a farm and taught himself to play guitar. After completing his service in the US Army, Johnson played guitar with the Milwaukee Supreme Angels, a local gospel group in Milwaukee, Wisconsin. However, he gravitated towards blues and formed his own trio in Milwaukee. He relocated to Chicago, Illinois, in the early 1960s. He backed Elmore James prior to James's death in 1963, and joined Muddy Waters' backing band in 1966. Johnson worked with various musicians during this period, including Chicago Bob Nelson. He recorded his debut album, Come On Home, in 1968, with Muddy Waters' band.

In 1970, Johnson moved to Boston, Massachusetts, and found work on the blues festival and college circuits for the next few years. His album Born in Georgia was released by Black & Blue Records. It was followed by Chicken Shack (1974), Lonesome in My Bedroom (1975), and the final album issued in his lifetime, Get Down to the Nitty Gritty (1976). On records issued in his lifetime, he was credited as either Luther Johnson or Luther "Georgia Boy" Johnson, though he was also known to contemporaries as Luther "Snake" Johnson.

Johnson died of cancer in Boston on March 18, 1976. He was interred at the Mount Hope Cemetery, in Mattapan, Massachusetts, where in 2014 the Killer Blues Project organised placing a headstone for him.

== Discography ==
Year	Title	Record label	Notes
1966	Live at Cafe Au Go Go	BluesWay	With John Lee Hooker
1966	The Blues Is Where It's At	BluesWay	With Otis Spann
1967	The Bottom of the Blues	BluesWay	With Otis Spann
1968	Cryin' Time	Vanguard	With Otis Spann
1969	Come On Home	Douglas Music	
1969	The Muddy Waters Blues Band	Transatlantic	With the Muddy Waters Blues Band
1972	Born in Georgia	Black & Blue	
1974	Chicken Shack	Muse	With the Muddy Waters Blues Band
1975	Lonesome in My Bedroom	Evidence	
1976	Get Down to the Nitty Gritty	New Rose Records	
1992	They Call Me the Snake	New Rose Records	
2002	They Call Me the Popcorn Man	Black & Blue Records	

== See also ==
- List of Chicago blues musicians
- List of electric blues musicians
