= Jazz: A History of the New York Scene =

1962 book by Kunstadt and Charters

- Author: Samuel Charters, Leonard Kunstadt
- Language: English
- Genre: Non-fiction
- Publisher: Doubleday
- Publication date: 1962
- Publication place: United States

Jazz: A History of the New York Scene is a book by Len Kunstadt (founder, with blues great Victoria Spivey, of the Spivey Records label) and Sam Charters documenting the 20th-century jazz scene in New York City.
