= Lucille Spann =

American singer

Lucille Spann (June 23, 1938 – August 2, 1994), was an American blues singer who participated in the Chicago Blues community in the 1960s and 1970s.

== Life and works ==
Lucille Spann was born Mahalia Lucille Jenkins in Bolton, Mississippi, the ninth child of Gertrude and Sherman Jenkins. Her mother died before she was five, and she was brought up by her father and her sisters. She started out singing gospel music, and was banned from listening to the blues. Nevertheless, she developed a liking for Bessie Smith, T-Bone Walker and other blues singers. She moved to Chicago in her teens, where she met Otis Spann whilst working as a barmaid. Soon she started working with him musically and later married him in 1969.

She became one of the musicians who recorded with Spivey Records alongside Otis, Muddy Waters, Luther "Guitar Junior" Johnson, Sammy Lawhorn, Paul Oscher, Pee Wee Madison, S. P. Leary and Willie Smith.

After Otis Spann's death in 1970, she continued singing, making recordings with Mighty Joe Young. She also participated in a festival dedicated to Otis Spann on September 10, 1972, featuring John Sinclair, Sun Ra, Freddie King, Luther Allison, Johnny Shines, Otis Rush and Sippie Wallace.

She released two singles in 1972, "Womans Lib" b/w "What You Do To Your Woman", and "Country Girl Returns" (parts 1 and 2). She also released an album Cry Before I Go in 1974.

Spann died in August 1994 in Vicksburg, Mississippi, at the age of 56. In 2017 the Killer Blues Headstone Project placed the headstone for Lucille Spann at Cedar Hill Cemetery in Vicksburg.

== Discography ==
- Cry Before I Go (BluesWay, 1974)

With Otis Spann

- The Bottom of the Blues (BluesWay, 1968)
- Cryin' Time (Vanguard, 1969)
