= Bill Dicey =

- Born: William J. Dicey; May 25, 1936; Annapolis, Maryland, U.S.
- Died: March 17, 1993 (aged 56) Rock Hall, Maryland, U.S.
- Genres: Blues
- Occupations: Harmonicist, singer and songwriter
- Instruments: Harmonica, vocals
- Years active: 1960s–1993
- Labels: Spivey Records, JSP Records

William J. Dicey (May 25, 1936 – March 17, 1993) was an American blues harmonicist, singer and songwriter. He recorded two live albums and one studio album in his own name, as well as playing the harmonica and singing on a number of other musician's recordings. He was a regular fixture in the New York blues scene from the 1970s to the time of his death.

== Life and career ==
Dicey was born in Annapolis, Maryland, United States, and first played the harmonica at the age of three, but began an interest in blues harmonica styling five years later. Having been given a Hohner Marine Band model, Dicey began playing on street corners with black musicians from his neighborhood. By his mid-teens, Dicey was playing the drums in an otherwise all-black group, playing R&B numbers of the time. In 1953, the whole ensemble were drafted with Dicey joining the United States Air Force. Interest in music had waned by the time all the individuals had returned to civilian life, with Dicey giving up playing music in 1959. He relocated to Atlanta, Georgia in the mid-1960s and took up playing the harmonica again, working with Buddy Moss on some ultimately unreleased recordings. Together they formed the Atlanta Blues Band, which toured colleges and clubs in the South in the late-1960s. Around this time, Dicey settled in New York City, where he became associated with Charles Walker. Dicey also became a regular session musician with Spivey Records. As a part of Victoria Spivey's house band, Dicey subsequently provided backing on recordings made by Roosevelt Sykes, Big Joe Turner, Lloyd Glenn, Washboard Doc, Louisiana Red, Sugar Blue and Eunice Davis.

Dicey became a vital member of the New York blues scene over the next two decades. He was the founder and host of the Sunday jam session at the New York blues club, Dan Lynch's Bar and Grill, where his duties including booking acts and leading the club's resident musical ensemble. His tutelage provided an early musical outlet for both the Holmes Brothers and Popa Chubby. Dicey became known for being able to play the "C" harmonica in five keys. Still associated with Spivey Records, Dicey recorded a live album, Caught in the Act, at Dan Lynch's in 1980. In 1983, Operator! Operator! I'm Trying to Get in Touch With My Baby Again! was another live album issued by Spivey Records, accredited to 'Bill Dicey With the Fabulous Holmes Brothers With Popsy'.

The only studio album recorded by Dicey in his own name took place in London in 1987. Dicey's regular Dan Lynch's Bar and Grill guitarist, Richard Studholme, had moved back to his native England, and Dicey visited him there when the notion of recording an album bore fruit. Bill Dicey (harmonica, guitar, vocals), Richard 'Ted' Studholme (guitar), Phil Kitto (bass), and Kevin Spratt (drums) provided the music which was recorded at Samurai Studio, close to Borough High Street, London, with recording engineer, Jack Ezra. The resultant recording was released as Fool In Love, on JSP Records. Three other tracks were recorded around that time for a BBC Radio session at the Maida Vale Studios by the same musicians; these comprised the bonus tracks that were included in the Fool in Love – The Complete Sessions re-release in 2019.

Dicey died of cancer in March 1993, at the age of 56. His last words were, "This sucks".

In addition to those recordings described above, Dicey's harmonica playing, and sometimes vocals, can be heard on Louisiana Red's Louisiana Red Sings the Blues (1972, Atco Records), Jerry McCain, Frank Frost, and Arthur "Big Boy" Crudup's Harpin' on It (1972, Carnival Gold Standard), Paul Oscher's New York Really Has the Blues (1975, Spivey Records), The Best of Louisiana Red (1995, Evidence Records), and Pinetop Perkins' posthumous compilation, Chicago Boogie Blues Piano Man (2020, JSP Records).

== Albums ==
- Caught in the Act (live album) (1980, Spivey Records)
- Operator! Operator! I'm Trying to Get in Touch With My Baby Again! (live album) (1983, Spivey) - credited to 'Bill Dicey With the Fabulous Holmes Brothers With Popsy'
- Fool in Love (1987, JSP Records)
- Fool in Love – The Complete Sessions (2019, JSP) – reissue of above with bonus tracks

== See also ==
- List of harmonicists
