= The Blues of Otis Spann =

Studio album by Otis Spann
- Released: 1964
- Recorded: May 4, 1964
- Studio: Decca No. 2 Studio, West Hampstead, London
- Genre: Blues
- Length: 49:55
- Label: Decca; LK 4615
- Producer: Michael Vernon

Otis Spann chronology
Otis Spann Is the Blues (1961)	The Blues of Otis Spann (1964)	The Blues Never Die! (1965)

The Blues of Otis Spann is an album by blues pianist and vocalist Otis Spann recorded in London in 1964 and released by the UK Decca label.

== Reception ==
Professional ratings
Review scores
Source	Rating
AllMusic	2/5 stars
Record Mirror	3/5 stars

AllMusic reviewer Bill Dahl stated "A Mike Vernon-produced British album from 1964 that was one of Spann's first full-length dates as a leader. Nice band, too".

== Track listing ==
All compositions by Otis Spann except where noted

1. "Rock Me Mama" (Arthur Crudup) − 4:20
2. "I Came from Clarksdale" − 3:30
3. "Keep Your Hand Out of My Pocket" − 5:10
4. "Spann's Boogie" − 4:35
5. "Sarah Street" − 3:35
6. "The Blues Don't Like Nobody" − 4:40
7. "Country Boy" (McKinley Morganfield) − 3:32 Additional track on CD reissue
8. "Pretty Girls Everywhere" (Eugene Church, Thomas Williams) − 2:51 Additional track on CD reissue
9. "My Home Is in the Delta" − 4:30 Additional track on CD reissue
10. "Meet Me in the Bottom" − 3:45
11. "Lost Sheep in the Fold" − 2:25
12. "I Got a Feeling" − 4:10
13. "Jangleboogie" − 3:30
14. "T 99" − 5:20
15. "Natural Days" − 4:00
16. "You Gonna Need My Help" (Morganfield) − 4:30 Additional track on CD reissue

== Personnel ==
- Otis Spann − vocals, piano
- Brother − guitar
- Ransom Knowling − bass
- Little Willie Smith – drums
- Eric Clapton − guitar (track 8)
- Jimmy Page − overdubbed harmonica, guitar, bass (track 8)
