= Guitar Junior =

Guitar Junior may refer to:

- Lonnie Brooks (1933–2017), blues singer and guitarist
- Luther "Guitar Junior" Johnson (1939–2022), American blues singer and guitarist
