= Robert Lockwood Jr. =

American Delta blues guitarist (1915–2006)

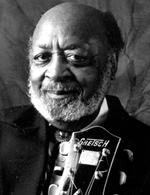

Background information
- Also known as: "Robert Junior" Lockwood
- Born: Robert Lockwood Jr. March 27, 1915; Turkey Scratch, Arkansas, U.S.
- Died: November 21, 2006 (aged 91) Cleveland, Ohio, U.S.
- Genres: Delta blues, electric blues, Chicago blues, country blues
- Instrument(s): Guitar, organ
- Years active: 1930s–2006
- Formerly of: Robert Johnson, B.B. King

Robert Lockwood Jr., a.k.a. Robert Jr. Lockwood, (March 27, 1915 – November 21, 2006) was an American Delta blues guitarist, who recorded for Chess Records and other Chicago labels in the 1950s and 1960s. He was the only guitarist to have learned to play directly from Robert Johnson. Robert Lockwood was one of the first professional black entertainers to appear on radio in the South, on the King Biscuit Time radio show. Lockwood is known for his longtime collaboration with Sonny Boy Williamson II and for his work in the mid-1950s with Little Walter.

== Biography ==
=== Early life ===
Lockwood was born in Turkey Scratch, Arkansas, a hamlet west of Helena. He was one of two children born to Robert Lockwood Sr. and Esther Reese Lockwood, later known as Estella Coleman. He started playing the organ in his father's church at the age of eight. His parents divorced, and later the famous bluesman Robert Johnson lived with Lockwood's mother for 10 years off and on.

Lockwood learned from Johnson not only how to play guitar but also timing and stage presence. Because of his personal and professional association with Johnson, he became known as "Robert Junior" Lockwood, a nickname by which he was known among musicians for the rest of his life, although he later frequently professed his dislike for this appellation.

=== Early career ===
By age 15, Lockwood was playing professionally at parties in the Helena area. He often played with his quasi-stepfather Robert Johnson and with Sonny Boy Williamson II and Johnny Shines. Lockwood played at fish fries, in juke joints, and on street corners throughout the Mississippi Delta in the 1930s. On one occasion he played on one side of the Sunflower River while Johnson played on the other, with the people of Clarksdale, Mississippi, milling about the bridge, reportedly unable to tell which guitarist was the real Robert Johnson.

Around 1937–1938 Lockwood worked with Williamson and Elmore James in the Delta, at places like Winona, Greenwood, and Greenville (where they most probably met Johnson, who died in 1938). Lockwood played with Williamson in the Clarksdale area in 1938 and 1939. He also played with Howlin' Wolf and others in Memphis, Tennessee, around 1938. From 1939 to 1940 he split his time playing in St. Louis, Missouri; Chicago; and Helena.

On July 1, 1941, Lockwood made his first recordings, with Doctor Clayton, for the Bluebird label in Aurora, Illinois. On July 30 he recorded four songs, which were released as the first two 78-rpm singles under his own name: "Little Boy Blue" backed with "Take a Little Walk with Me" (Bluebird B-8820) and "I'm Gonna Train My Baby" backed with "Black Spider Blues" (Bluebird B-8877). These songs remained in his repertoire throughout his career.

In 1941, Lockwood and Williamson began their influential performances on the daily radio program King Biscuit Time on KFFA in Helena. For several years in the early 1940s the pair played together in and around Helena and continued to be associated with King Biscuit Time. From about 1944 to 1949 Lockwood played in West Memphis, Arkansas; St. Louis; Chicago and Memphis. He was an influence on B. B. King and played in King's band early in King's career in Memphis.

In 1950, Lockwood settled in Chicago. A 1951 78-rpm single featured "I'm Gonna Dig Myself a Hole" backed with "Dust My Broom" (Mercury 8260), and a 1954 release contained "Aw Aw (Baby)" backed with "Sweet Woman (from Maine)" (J.O.B 1107). In 1954, he replaced Louis Myers as the guitarist in Little Walter's band. He played on Walter's number 1 hit "My Babe" in 1955. He left the band around 1957. In the late 1950s he recorded several sessions with Sonny Boy Williamson for Chess Records, sessions which also included Willie Dixon and Otis Spann. Lockwood also performed or recorded with Sunnyland Slim, Eddie Boyd, Roosevelt Sykes, J. B. Lenoir, and Muddy Waters, among others.

=== Later career ===
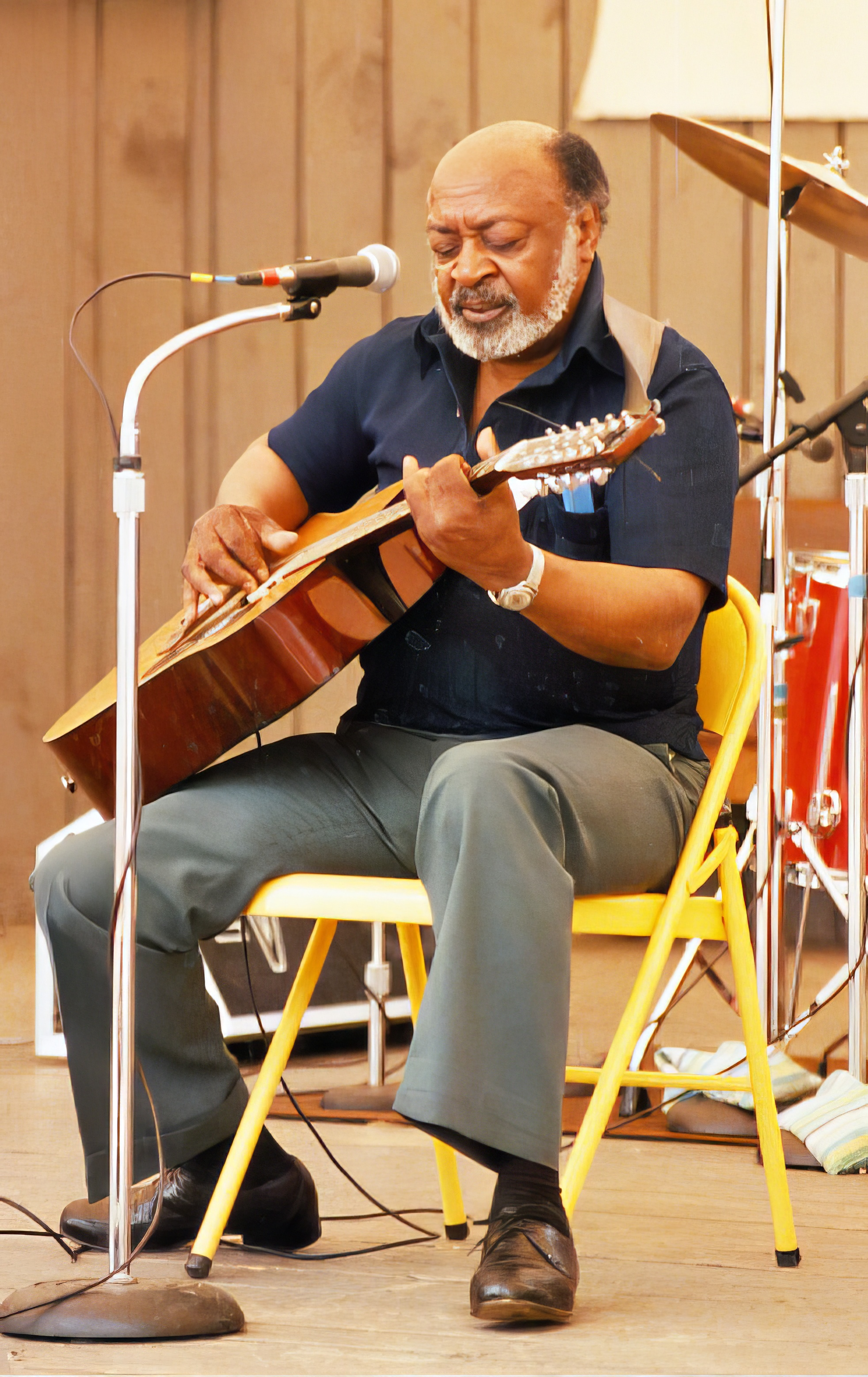
Lockwood in Knoxville, Tennessee, at the 1982 World's Fair

In 1960, Lockwood moved with Williamson to Cleveland, Ohio, where he resided for the second half of his life. In the early 1960s, as Bob Lockwood Jr. and Combo, he had a regular gig at Loving's Grill, at 8426 Hough Avenue. From the 1970s through the 2000s, he performed regularly with his band the All Stars at numerous local venues, including Pirate's Cove, the Euclid Tavern, Peabody's, Flipside Tavern, Wilbert's, Brother's Lounge, and, in the last years of his career, Fat Fish Blue (on the corner of Prospect and Ontario in downtown Cleveland) every Wednesday night. He played his regular three sets two days before the illness which led to his death. The All Stars continued the Wednesday residency for two years after his death.

His studio albums as a bandleader include Steady Rollin' Man, with the Aces (recorded 1970, Delmark); Contrasts (recorded 1973, Trix); ...Does 12 (recorded 1975, Trix); Hangin' On, with Johnny Shines (recorded 1979, Rounder); Mister Blues Is Back to Stay, with Shines (recorded 1980, Rounder); What's the Score (recorded 1990, Lockwood); and I Got to Find Me a Woman (recorded 1996, Verve). A 1972 45-rpm single included "Selfish Ways" backed with "Down Home Cookin'" (Big Star BB 020). Reviewing Does 12 in Christgau's Record Guide: Rock Albums of the Seventies (1981), Robert Christgau said, "Lovers of urban blues will cherish this record by Robert Johnson's self-designated heir. It even boasts some adventurously progressive saxophone and twelve-string stylings that do no violence to a notoriously intransigent genre. But Lockwood is an undistinguished vocal interpreter, and only one of his originals—the imperturbable 'Selfish Ways'—is worthy of interpretation itself."

His solo guitar and vocal albums include Plays Robert and Robert (recorded 1982, Evidence), Delta Crossroads (recorded 2000, Telarc) and The Legend Live (recorded 2003, M.C.). A duet session with the pianist Otis Spann in 1960 resulted in Otis Spann Is the Blues and Walking the Blues, released by Candid.

At the age of 60, in 1975, he discovered the 12-string guitar and preferentially played it almost exclusively for the latter third of his life. His most famous 12-string was a blue instrument custom designed and made by the Japanese luthiers Moony Omote and Age Sumi. It was acquired by the Rock and Roll Hall of Fame Museum in February 2013 and is displayed there.

A live performance by Lockwood, Henry "Mule" Townsend, Joseph "Pinetop" Perkins, and David "Honeyboy" Edwards, recorded in 2004 and released in 2007 as Last of the Great Mississippi Delta Bluesmen: Live in Dallas, won a Grammy Award in 2008 in the Best Traditional Blues Album category. It was the first Grammy Award for Lockwood and Townsend. Two of Lockwood's other albums were nominated for Grammys: I Got to Find Me a Woman in 1999 and Delta Crossroads in 2001.

Lockwood's last known recording session was at Ante Up Audio studio in Cleveland, with longtime collaborator Mark "Cleveland Fats" Hahn, to record the album The Way Things Go for Honeybee Entertainment.

Lockwood died at the age of 91 in Cleveland, having suffered a cerebral aneurysm and a stroke. He is buried at Riverside Cemetery, in Cleveland.

His survivors included his wife, Mary Smith Lockwood of Cleveland; four stepchildren from his first marriage to Annie Roberts Lockwood, who died in 1997; and four stepchildren from his second marriage.

== Awards and honors ==
- 2008 Grammy Award – Traditional Blues Album
- Street in Cleveland named Robert Lockwood Jr. Drive
- Blues Hall Of Fame inductee (class of 1989)
- 1995 National Heritage Fellowship awarded by the National Endowment for the Arts, which is the highest honor in the folk and traditional arts in the United States presented by then–First Lady Hillary Clinton (1995)
- Seven-time W.C. Handy Blues Music Award winner
- Honorary Doctorate Of Humane Letters from Case Western Reserve University (2001)
- Honorary Doctor Of Music from Cleveland State University (2002)

== Discography ==
Solo

- Steady Rollin' Man (Delmark, 1973)
- Blues Live! (Trio, 1975; released in Japan only)
- I Got to Find Me a Woman (Verve, 1998)
- Delta Crossroads (Telarc, 2000)
- The Legend Live (M.C., 2004)

With Otis Spann

- Otis Spann Is the Blues (Candid, 1960)
- Walking the Blues (Barnaby, 1960 [1972])

With Roosevelt Sykes

- Feel Like Blowing My Horn (Delmark, 1970 [1973])

With Sonny Boy Williamson

- The Real Folk Blues (Chess, 1947-64 [1966])

== See also ==
- Chicago Blues Festival
- List of blues musicians
- List of Chicago blues musicians
- List of country blues musicians
- List of Delta blues musicians
