= Mac Arnold =

American blues musician (born 1942)

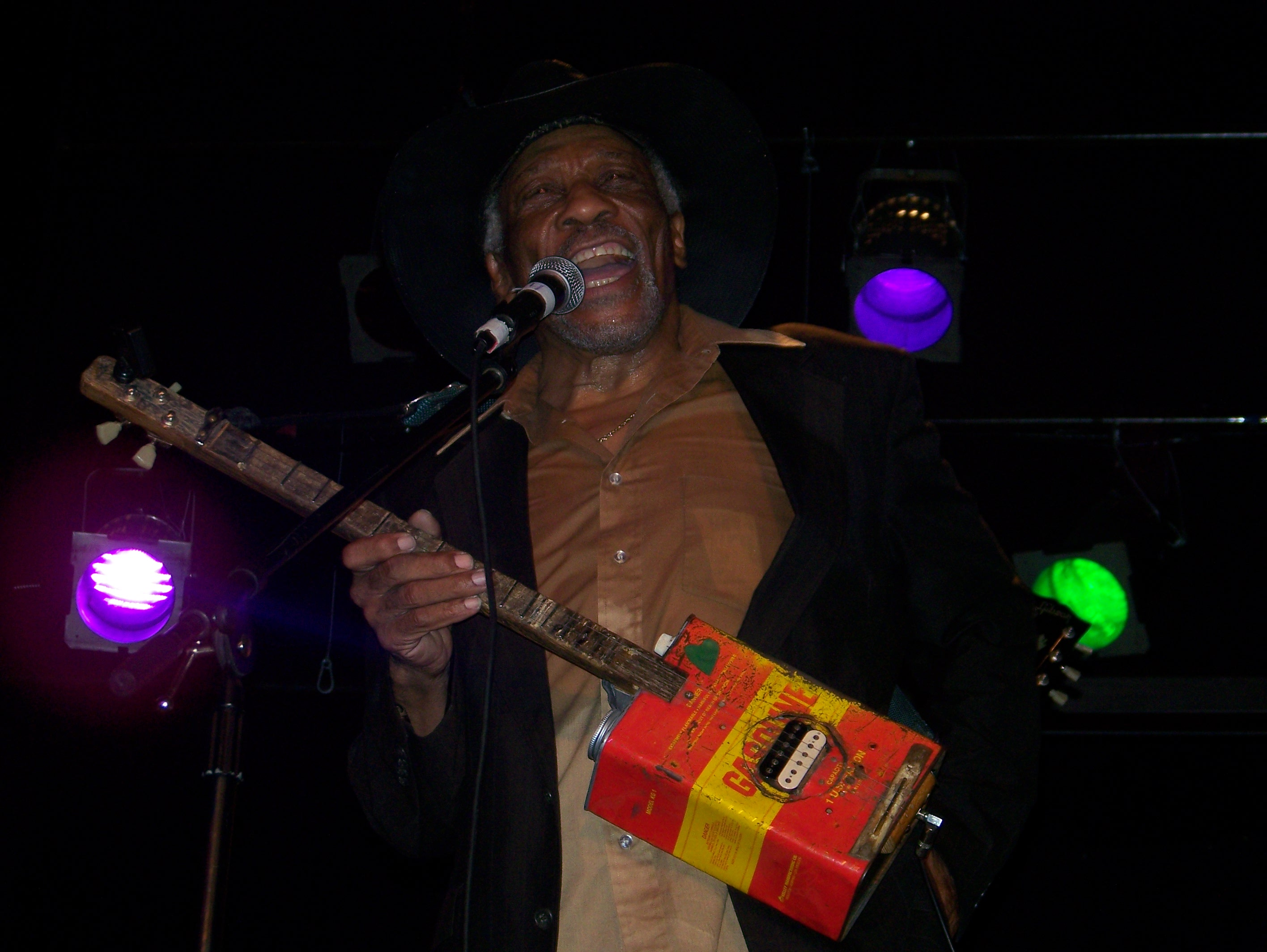

Background information
- Born: June 30, 1942 (age 84); Ware Place, South Carolina, United States
- Genre: Blues
- Occupation: Musician
- Instruments: Bass guitar, gas-can guitar
- Years active: 1965–1990s, 2006-today
- Label: Plantation One Productions
- Website: www.macarnold.com

Mac Arnold (born June 30, 1942) is an American blues musician from South Carolina.

== Early years ==
Mac Arnold was born in Ware Place, South Carolina, and is one of 13 children born and raised on his father's farm.

Arnold's musical journey began in the 1950s when he and his brother Leroy fashioned a guitar from a steel gas can, broomsticks, wood, nails, and screen wire:

Arnold, 72, laughs as he talks about how gas can guitars came about. One of those homemade guitars, the one most see him playing on stage, was leaning on a wall recently near his kitchen table in his Pelzer home.

Arnold's brother, Leroy, found a way to turn a gas can into a guitar when their father, Jodie Arnold, went to Florida to pick oranges.

"Dad wouldn't let him buy one (a guitar)," Mac Arnold said. "So when he was about 15 years old, he figured out how to make one on his own. We used to tie wire to the rafters in the barn, and we knew that made sound because of the tin roof. You could hear it vibrate through the barn."

Arnold has since become famous for the gas-can guitar and has taught many other people how to make them.

His early career included working with a young James Brown in the band, J. Floyd & the Shamrocks. Arnold moved to Chicago in 1965, where he worked with A.C. Reed before joining Muddy Waters' band in 1966. Arnold appears on the November 1966 live recording released in 2009 as Muddy Waters - Authorized Bootleg. He formed the Soul Invaders in 1967, finding work backing up B.B. King, The Temptations, Little Milton and many others.

Mac's studio work in the 1960s includes playing bass on several notable blues albums, including Otis Spann's The Blues Is Where It's At and John Lee Hooker's Live At Cafe Au Go Go. He performed various session work after moving to California in the 1970s.

His TV work also included a four-year gig as part of the set band on Soul Train.

== Later years ==
By the 1990s, Arnold had grown weary of the road life and returned home to Pelzer, South Carolina and virtual retirement from the spotlight until 2006, when he was convinced to front his band, Plate Full O' Blues. Arnold's return to the stage was the subject of a 2-part musical-history documentary, Stan Woodward's final film, Nothing to Prove: Mac Arnold's Return to the Blues.

In 2013, Arnold opened his restaurant in Greenville, South Carolina's historic West End, where he hosted his popular yearly music event, The Cornbread and Collard Greens Blues Festival. Despite much local success in the food business, he decided to close the restaurant in August 2017 to once again concentrate on music, especially after his nomination into the Alabama Blues Hall of Fame.

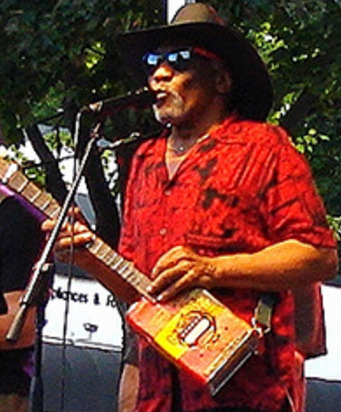
Mac Arnold performs with his band, Plate Full O' Blues, at the 'Fall for Greenville' arts festival, October 2013

On September 23, 2017, Mac Arnold was inducted into the Alabama Blues Hall of Fame at the historic Dr. John R. Drish House in Tuscaloosa, Alabama.

== Awards and recognition ==
- The Blues Foundation Awards
- Nominee, Best Traditional Blues Male Artist 2012.
- Nominee, Best DVD 2011, Woodward Studio, Nothing to Prove, Mac Arnold.
- Winner, Best Historical Album of the Year 2010, Chess Records - Authorized Bootleg (Muddy Waters) Mac Arnold appears on the album and accepted the award in Memphis.
- Winner 2006 Folk Heritage Award
- Awarded honorary doctorate of music from the University of South Carolina, May 10, 2014
- Alabama Blues Hall of Fame, inductee, 2017
- Mac Arnold was included in the 2021 South Carolina African American History Calendar.
- Mac Arnold was inducted into the South Carolina Entertainment and Music Hall of Fame in June 2023.

== Music in schools ==
Arnold and the band support the preservation of music education in public schools through the, "I Can Do Anything Foundation", an organization that was started following the release of a song by the same name, written by Mac Arnold and Max Hightower and performed by Plate full O' Blues.

== Discography ==
With Martin Scorsese

- Martin Scorsese Presents The Blues: Warming By The Devil's Fire (SONY/COLUMBIA/LEGACY, 2003)

With Muddy Waters

- Muddy Waters Authorized Bootleg: Live at the Fillmore Auditorium - San Francisco Nov 04-06 1966

With Otis Spann

- The Blues Is Where It's At (BluesWay, 1966)

With John Lee Hooker

- Live At The Café Au-Go-Go (Bluesway, 1966)
- The Best Of John Lee Hooker (MCA Records, 1992) “I’m Bad Like Jesse James”

With Plate Full O' Blues

- Nothin' To Prove (Plantation #1 Productions, 2005)
- Backbone & Gristle (Pfob Music LLC, 2008)
- Country Man (Plantation #1/VizzTone, 2009)
- Mac Arnold's Blues Revival (Live at The Great Eagle, 2011)
- Give It Away (Pfob Music LLC, 2016)
- On A Mission (Mac Arnold & Plate Full O' Blues, 2024)
- Mac Arnold & Plate Full O’ Blues Live At Crossroads (CD)

Misc

- Live At The Handlebar 2004 (DVD)
- Blues Revue - Blues Music Sampler (CD 2005)
- Feel the Presence: Traditional African American Music in South Carolina (a compilation CD for the S.C. Mckissick Museum)
