= The Bottom of the Blues =

Studio album by Otis Spann
- Released: 1968
- Recorded: November 20, 1967
- Studio: New York City
- Genre: Blues
- Length: 36:04
- Label: BluesWay; BL/BLS 6013
- Producer: Bob Thiele

Otis Spann chronology
The Blues Is Where It's At (1966)	The Bottom of the Blues (1968)	Cryin' Time (1969)

The Bottom of the Blues is an album by blues pianist/vocalist Otis Spann recorded in 1967 and originally released by the BluesWay label.

Professional ratings
Review scores
Source	Rating
AllMusic	4.5/5 stars

== Track listing ==
All compositions by Otis Spann except where noted

1. "Heart Loaded with Trouble" (James Oden) − 2:58
2. "Diving Duck" − 5:25
3. "Shimmy Baby" (Muddy Waters) − 3:54
4. "Looks Like Twins" (Muddy Waters) − 4:58
5. "I'm a Fool" (Lucille Spann) − 3:09
6. "My Man" (Lucille Spann) − 3:35
7. "Down to Earth" − 4:32
8. "Nobody Knows" (Walter Davis) − 4:43
9. "Doctor Blues" − 2:50

== Personnel ==
- Otis Spann − piano, vocals
- George Buford − harmonica
- Luther Johnson, Muddy Waters, Sammy Lawhorn − guitar
- Sonny Wimberley − bass
- S. P. Leary – drums
- Lucille Spann − vocals (tracks 3 & 5-7)
