= Sax Mallard =

American jazz saxophonist and bandleader (1915–1986)

Oett M. Mallard (September 2, 1915 – August 29, 1986), also known as Sax Mallard, was a Chicago-based jazz saxophonist and bandleader.

== Career and later life ==
He worked briefly (April–May 1943) with Duke Ellington and his Orchestra, as well as with Ellington's Octet (with Ellington, Mallard, Harold "Shorty" Baker, Ray Nance, Joe "Tricky Sam" Nanton, Lawrence Brown, Harry Carney, Alvin "Junior" Raglin.

In 1946 he recorded with Tampa Red in a line-up comprising Blind John Davis, Ernest "Big" Crawford, and Armand "Jump" Jackson, and that same year, and in 1947, he also recorded with Big Bill Broonzy, and with Roosevelt Sykes, with whom he would continue to record into the early 1960s.

In 1951, following a recording session for Big Bill Broonzy, Mallard recorded a track under his own name using the same musicians, and in 1952 he recorded three sessions for Mercury Records under the name of Sax Mallard and His Orchestra, with Sykes, Crawford, Jackson and Andrew Tibbs, of which only one track was released, as a 45 rpm, with the 1951 recording.

He died of cancer on August 29, 1986, in Chicago.

== Discography ==
=== As leader/co-leader ===
- 1951: "The Bunny Hop"/"Accent on Youth" - Mercury 70002

=== As sideman ===
With Roosevelt Sykes

- Feel Like Blowing My Horn (Delmark, 1970 [1973])
