= I Got to Find Me a Woman =

Studio album by Robert Lockwood Jr.
- Released: 1998
- Studio: Suma (Painesville, Ohio)
- Genre: Blues
- Label: Verve
- Producer: John Snyder

Robert Lockwood Jr. chronology
| Contrasts (1995) | I Got to Find Me a Woman (1998) | The Complete Trix Recordings (1999) |

I Got to Find Me a Woman is an album by the American blues musician Robert Lockwood Jr., released in 1998. Lockwood was in his 80s when he recorded it. The album was nominated for a Grammy Award for "Best Traditional Blues Album".

== Production ==
The album was produced by John Snyder, and was recorded partly at Suma Recording studio. B.B. King played on the title track, and duetted with Lockwood on "Bob and B."; Joe Louis Walker also contributed to I Got to Find Me a Woman. Lockwood, who knew Robert Johnson, and whose mother once lived with the musician, covered Johnson's "Walkin' Blues" and "Kindhearted Woman Blues". The album also includes covers of Leroy Carr's "How Long" and Roosevelt Sykes's "She's Little and She's Low".

== Critical reception ==
Professional ratings
Review scores
| Source | Rating |
|---|---|
| AllMusic | 4.5/5 stars |
| The Baltimore Sun | 4/4 stars |
| Boston Herald | 3.5/4 stars |
| Chicago Tribune | 4/4 stars |
| The Encyclopedia of Popular Music | 4/5 stars |
| Los Angeles Daily News | 2.5/4 stars |
| The Tampa Tribune | 3.5/4 stars |

The Baltimore Sun thought that "there's no guitar flash here, no screaming vocals, just the old blues played with elegant authority by one of the masters." The Chicago Tribune wrote that, "instead of starting familiar blues songs, such as Johnson's 'Walkin' Blues', and Lockwood's signature 'Take a Little Walk With Me', with the usual rhythmic guitar sound, he plucks a 12-string for a deeper jazz feel." Nashville Scene declared that "the title cut may be the blues song of the year, featuring a spry, defiant Lockwood backed by tight, fluid licks from guest star B.B. King and jubilant, funky bass support from Richard Smith."

Guitar Player also noted that "fat 9th chords, slick major 6th harmonies, and slippery II-V turnarounds permeate I Got to Find Me a Woman." The Los Angeles Daily News wrote that Lockwood "offers a lovely Robert Johnson medley ... where he exchanges his usual 12-string electric guitar for a six-string and plays sizzling slide." The Boston Herald called the album "the work of a genuine American treasure, still vital after all these years in the blues." The Star-Ledger deemed I Got to Find Me a Woman the best blues album of 1998.

AllMusic concluded that, "had this record—with its mix of spare, raw solos and duets juxtaposed with full band pieces that thunder quietly or roar loud and clear—come out in the late '60s, it might have been as big and important a record as anything cut by Muddy Waters (maybe more, since Waters didn't get to make albums as strong and straightforward as this until the 1970s)."

== Track listing ==
| No. | Title | Length |
|---|---|---|
| 1. | "Walkin' Blues" |
| 2. | "Take a Little Walk with Me" |
| 3. | "Little Boy Blue" |
| 4. | "Feel Like Blowing My Horn" |
| 5. | "I Got to Find Me a Woman" |
| 6. | "She's Little and She's Low" |
| 7. | "Big Legged Woman" |
| 8. | "Lockwood's Boogie" |
| 9. | "My Daily Wish" |
| 10. | "How Long" |
| 11. | "Kindhearted Woman Blues" |
| 12. | "Every Day I Have the Blues" |
| 13. | "Bob and B." |
| 14. | "For You My Love" |
