= Pretty Girls Everywhere =

1958 single by Eugene Church & the Fellows

Single by Eugene Church & the Fellows
- B-side: "For the Rest of My Life"
- Released: August 1958
- Genre: Soul
- Length: 2:35
- Label: Class 235
- Songwriters: Eugene Church, Thomas Williams

"Pretty Girls Everywhere"

Single by The Walker Brothers

from the album Introducing the Walker Brothers
- B-side: "Doin' the Jerk" (Scott Engel)
- Released: 26 February 1965 (UK)
- Recorded: 1964
- Genre: Pop, Beat
- Length: 2:30
- Label: Philips; Smash (US)
- Songwriters: Eugene Church, Thomas Williams
- Producer: Nick Venet

The Walker Brothers singles chronology
"Pretty Girls Everywhere" (1965)	"Love Her" (1965)

"Pretty Girls Everywhere" is a song written by Eugene Church and Thomas Williams.

It was first a hit for the American singer Eugene Church with his group The Fellows (including session drummer Earl Palmer) in 1958. Church's recording for Class records was his most popular reaching No. 6 R&B and No. 36 Pop in the US.

== Walker Brothers recording ==
In 1965, "Pretty Girls Everywhere" was recorded and released by the American pop group The Walker Brothers as their début single. The Walker Brothers' version is notable as it captures the group just before Scott Walker became the lead singer. In the lead position, John Walker is dominant in a brassy Beat music arrangement. The single is backed with Scott Walker's first composing credit "Doin' the Jerk". The group can be seen miming "Doin' the Jerk" on the 1965 beach party movie Beach Ball. In spite of the movie publicity the single did not chart in any territory.

=== Track listing ===
Philips – BF 1401 / Smash Records S-1952
No.	Title	Writer(s)	Length
1.	"Pretty Girls Everywhere"	Church, Williams	2:30
2.	"Doin' the Jerk"	Scott Engel	2:25

== Otis Spann recording ==
While touring Britain with the Muddy Waters Blues Band in 1964 piano player Otis Spann recorded a version of the song. It was recorded and released in 1967 on the Decca Records compilation ‘’Raw Blues’’. The band for that session included Spann on piano, Eric Clapton on guitar, Muddy Waters on guitar, Ransom Knowling, on bass and Willie "Big Eyes" Smith on drums. The recording occurred on May 4, at the Decca Studios in London, the producer was Mike Vernon and the engineers were Roy Baker and Gus Dudgeon.
