= Ransom Knowling =

American musician (1912–1967)

- Born: June 24, 1912; New Orleans, Louisiana, U.S.
- Died: October 22, 1967 (aged 55) Chicago, Illinois, U.S.
- Genres: Blues, rhythm and blues
- Instruments: Double bass, tuba, violin
- Years active: 1930s–1950s

Ransom Knowling (June 24, 1912 – October 22, 1967) was an American rhythm and blues musician, best known for playing bass on many blues recordings made in Chicago between the 1930s and 1950s, including those of Arthur Crudup and Little Brother Montgomery.

He was born in New Orleans, Louisiana, and began playing professionally around 1930 in the New Orleans bands led by Sidney Desvigne and Joe Robichaux. As well as bass, he played violin and tuba. By the late 1930s, he had moved to Chicago, and played on many of the blues records made in the city, including those by the Harlem Hamfats, Big Bill Broonzy, Roosevelt Sykes, Elmore James, Washboard Sam, Jazz Gillum, Sonny Boy Williamson I, T-Bone Walker, Roosevelt Sykes, Tommy McClennan, Lil Green, Doctor Clayton, Tampa Red and Muddy Waters. He played on Arthur Crudup's "That's All Right", recorded in 1946.

He died in Chicago in 1967, aged 55. In 2014 the Killer Blues Headstone Project placed a headstone for Ransom Knowling at Holy Sepulcher Cemetery in Hillside, Illinois.

== Discography ==
With Muddy Waters

- The Real Folk Blues (Chess, 1947-64 [1966])

With Big Joe Williams

- Blues On Highway 49 (Delmar Records [1963])

With Otis Spann

- The Blues of Otis Spann (Decca, 1964)

=== Tracks ===
- Arthur "Big Boy" Crudup - That's All Right Mama (1946)
- Lonnie Johnson - Devil's Got The Blues, Mr. Johnson Swing, Blue Ghost Blues, Friendless And Blue (1938)
- Memphis Minnie - Please Don't Stop Him (1937), I'm So Glad (1946)
- Big Bill Broonzy - That's All Right Baby (1939)
- Elmore James - Hawaiian Boogie (1953)
