= Walking the Blues =

Studio album by Otis Spann
- Released: 1972
- Recorded: August 23, 1960
- Studio: Fine Recording, NYC
- Genre: Blues
- Length: 45:36
- Label: Barnaby; KZ-31290
- Producer: Nat Hentoff

Otis Spann chronology
Sweet Giant of the Blues (1970)	Walking the Blues (1972)	Heart Loaded with Trouble (1973)

Walking the Blues is an album by blues pianist and vocalist Otis Spann recorded in New York in 1960 by Candid Records but not released until 1972 by the Barnaby label.

== Reception ==
Professional ratings
Review scores
Source	Rating
AllMusic	5/5 stars
And It Don't Stop	A

AllMusic reviewer Thom Owens stated "Walking the Blues is arguably the finest record Otis Spann ever cut, boasting 11 cuts of astounding blues piano. On several numbers, Spann is supported by guitarist Robert Jr. Lockwood and their interaction is sympathetic, warm, and utterly inviting. ... Most importantly, however, is the fact that Walking the Blues simply sounds great -- it's some of the finest blues piano you'll ever hear.".

== Track listing ==
All compositions by Otis Spann except where noted

1. "It Must Have Been the Devil" − 3:50
2. "Otis' Blues" − 4:16
3. "Going Down Slow" − 3:57
4. "Half Ain't Been Told" (Otis Spann, James Oden) − 4:38
5. "Monkey Face Woman" (Oden) − 4:55
6. "This Is the Blues" − 3:06
7. "Evil Ways" (Oden) − 3:50
8. "Come Day, Go Day" (Oden) − 4:10
9. "Walking the Blues" − 4:55
10. "Bad Condition" (Oden) − 4:21
11. "My Home Is on the Delta" (McKinley Morganfield) − 3:12

== Personnel ==
- Otis Spann − vocals, piano
- Robert Lockwood Jr. − guitar (tracks 1, 3–5, 7, 8, 10 & 11)
- St. Louis Jimmy − vocals (tracks 3, 5, 8, 10)
