= Country Sugar Papa =

Studio album by Luther "Guitar Junior" Johnson
- Released: March 29, 1994
- Genre: Blues
- Label: Bullseye Blues
- Producer: Ron Levy

Luther "Guitar Junior" Johnson chronology
It's Good to Be Me (1992)	Country Sugar Papa (1994)	Slammin on the West Side (1996)

Country Sugar Papa is an album by the American musician Luther "Guitar Junior" Johnson, released on March 29, 1994. It was his third album for Bullseye Blues Records. He supported it with a North American tour.

== Production ==
The album was produced by Ron Levy, who also played organ. Johnson was backed by his band, the Magic Rockers. He played a Gibson hollow body or a Fender Stratocaster on the tracks. Johnson often decided which songs to record based on the reactions of his concert audiences. "I'm a King Bee" is a cover of the Slim Harpo song. "Whiskey Drinkin' Woman" was written by Johnny Otis. "You Belong to Me" is a version of the Magic Sam song.

== Critical reception ==
Professional ratings
Review scores
Source	Rating
All Music Guide to the Blues	4/5 stars
Chicago Tribune	3/4 stars
The Encyclopedia of Popular Music	3/5 stars
MusicHound Blues: The Essential Album Guide	2.5/5 stars
The Penguin Guide to Blues Recordings	4/4 stars
The Rolling Stone Jazz and Blues Album Guide	3/5 stars

The Chicago Tribune said that "Johnson insists on cooking up the real deal, his slashing, West Side-influenced guitar and rough-hewn vocals ably backed by his tough band". The Edmonton Journal noted that Johnson's "guitar sound ... cuts through an arrangement with the technique of a skilled surgeon and his forceful vocal reflects an experience that started as a youngster in the church." The Philadelphia Inquirer praised the "blistering vocals, wicked guitar leads and ... smoking rhythm section." The Lake Geneva Regional noted the "classic ... raw and wicked" sound.

== Track listing ==
No.	Title	Length
1.	"Walkin' with You Baby"
2.	"If the Blues Was Whiskey"
3.	"Big Leg Woman"
4.	"Called Me on the Phone Last Night"
5.	"You Told Me Baby"
6.	"Southern Country Boy"
7.	"I'm a King Bee"
8.	"Can't Come Home"
9.	"I'm Going Back, Back, Back"
10.	"I Love You"
11.	"Whiskey Drinkin' Woman"
12.	"Ain't Treating Me Right"
13.	"You Belong to Me"
