= Washboard Doc =

American singer

- Born: Joseph Doctor; September 8, 1911; Johns Island, Charleston County, South Carolina, United States
- Died: September 16, 1988 (aged 77) Brooklyn, New York, United States
- Genres: New York blues
- Occupations: Singer, washboard player
- Instruments: Vocals, washboard
- Years active: 1935–1988

Joseph Doctor (September 8, 1911 – September 16, 1988), known as Washboard Doc, was an American New York blues musician, who specialised in playing the washboard. He recorded with Victoria Spivey, Alec Seward, Paul Oscher, Screamin' Jay Hawkins and Big Joe Turner among others.

== Biography ==
He was born in Johns Island, Charleston County, South Carolina, United States. Scant details exist of Doctor's early life, but it is known that he relocated to New York in 1935. Once established, using the 'stage name' of Washboard Doc, he performed on the streets of the city playing an improvised washboard with various percussive attachments. In addition, he sang to entertain the passers-by. For many years, he remained at the extreme edge of black music performers, having later claimed to have recorded with both Ralph Willis and Sonny Terry in the 1950s. The liner notes to Early Morning Blues (1980) relating to Washboard Doc stated, "His first recording was with bluesman Ralph Willis about 1950. About two years later he cut with Sonny Terry for a Folkways LP, playing washboards and spoons". However his involvement, if true, was not credited on either album by Willis or Terry.

In May 1969, in Willie Dixon's basement recording studio in Chicago, Illinois, Washboard Doc provided backing on five tracks which, along with other performers work, was released on the 1970 album, Victoria Spivey Presents The All Star Blues World of Spivey Records in Stereo, issued unsurprisingly on Spivey Records. Washboard Doc similarly provided his washboard backing to a small number of tracks on two subsequent Spivey Records collections that were released that year. Victoria Spivey usually recorded at least one track on each of the collections issued by her own record label. One music journalist noted that Washboard Doc "played with varying degrees of appropriateness".

Washboard Doc had been present at a house party in 1966 in New York, that also included fellow musicians Alec Seward, Sonny Terry and Brownie McGhee. They had a spontaneous jam session which was recorded, with Seward prominent backed by Terry (harmonica, vocals), McGhee (acoustic guitar, vocals) and Washboard Doc (washboard). The recording was of sufficient quality that it was released in 1975, entitled Late One Saturday Evening. Also in 1975, Spivey Records issued an album primarily credited to Paul Oscher, New York Really Has the Blues, which had three tracks by 'Washboard Doc and Friends'. In 1978, Spivey issued a six track LP, I'm Gonna Sit Right Down and Write Myself a Letter. Another composite affair it featured Big Joe Turner with the Bill Dacey-Robert Ross Band with Lloyd Glenn on piano, plus Washboard Doc and Brenda Bell.

By 1979, Washboard Doc had teamed up with two other musicians; Cab Lucky (1938 – 2011) and John "Flash" Whitner (1919 – unknown). Lucky played harmonica and guitar, and was a singer, whilst Flash also sang and played 'humazoo' and washtub bass. The trio recorded an album, Washboard Doc's Hep 3, billed as Washboard Doc and his Hep 3. The following year, another album, Early Morning Blues, this time on L+R Records was credited to Washboard Doc, Lucky & Flash with Special Guest Louisiana Red. The trio, along with other blues musicians as part of the American Folk Blues Festival, undertook a short tour in Europe, primarily Germany. This resulted in the release of American Folk Blues Festival '80, with two sides by the threesome, their versions of "Flip, Flop and Fly" and "Shake, Rattle and Roll".

In 1984, Washboard Doc backed Screamin' Jay Hawkins on his album, The Art of Screamin' Jay Hawkins, another Spivey Records offering.

Washboard Doc died in Brooklyn, on September 16, 1988, aged 77.

== Discography ==
=== Albums ===
Year	Title	Record label	Credited to
1970	Victoria Spivey Presents The All Star Blues World of Spivey Records in Stereo	Spivey Records	Various artists
1970	Spivey's Blues Parade	Spivey Records	Various artists
1970	Kings and the Queen Volume Two	Spivey Records	Various artists
1975	Late One Saturday Evening	Blue Labor	Alec Seward
1975	New York Really Has the Blues	Spivey Records	Paul Oscher
1978	I'm Gonna Sit Right Down and Write Myself a Letter	Spivey Records	Big Joe Turner and various artists
1979	What Is the Blues	Spivey Records	Various artists
1979	Washboard Doc's Hep 3	Spivey Records	Washboard Doc and his Hep 3
1980	Early Morning Blues	L+R Records	Washboard Doc, Lucky & Flash with Special Guest Louisiana Red
1980	Eunice Davis Sings the Classic Blues	L+R Records	Eunice Davis
1980	Let's Boogie	Spivey Records	Various artists
1980	American Folk Blues Festival '80	L+R Records	Various artists
1984	The Art of Screamin' Jay Hawkins	Spivey Records	Screamin' Jay Hawkins
