= The Blues Never Die! =

Studio album by Otis Spann
- Released: 1965
- Recorded: November 21, 1964
- Studio: Chicago
- Genre: Blues
- Length: 33:46
- Label: Prestige; PR 7391
- Producer: Samuel Charters

Otis Spann chronology
The Blues of Otis Spann (1964)	The Blues Never Die! (1965)	Otis Spann's Chicago Blues (1966)

The Blues Never Die! is an album by the blues pianist and vocalist Otis Spann, recorded in Chicago in 1964 and released by the Prestige label the following year.

The story behind this album is unusual to say the least… but then again, it was the 1960’s! Producer Sam Charters had hosted a folk concert at Carnegie Hall where the Muddy Waters band had played. Muddy called Charters the next day to say that they hadn't been paid enough to get back to Chicago, and asked the producer to arrange a session for them which Charters did. Since Muddy was on contract to Chess, he was not to sing a lead vocal or to play a slide solo. Nor could they use his name. This album predated Charters' great "Chicago /The Blues /Today!" trilogy that was a further step in the careers of both Spann and Cotton.

== Reception ==
Professional ratings
Review scores
Source	Rating
AllMusic	4.5/5 stars
The Encyclopedia of Popular Music	5/5 stars
The Penguin Guide to Blues Recordings	2/4 stars
Record Mirror	3/5 stars
The Rolling Stone Album Guide	3.5/5 stars

AllMusic reviewer Alex Henderson stated: "Boasting fellow Chicago blues dynamo James Cotton on both harmonica and lead vocals, The Blues Never Die! is one of Otis Spann's most inspired albums ... Spann and Cotton enjoy a very strong rapport on this consistently rewarding date."

== Track listing ==
All compositions by Otis Spann except where noted

1. "The Blues Never Die" − 3:40
2. "I Got a Feeling" − 2:50
3. "One More Mile to Go" (James Cotton) − 3:45
4. "Feelin' Good" (Cotton) − 3:25
5. "After Awhile" − 3:57
6. "Dust My Broom" (Elmore James) − 2:40
7. "Straighten Up, Baby" (Cotton) − 2:30
8. "Come On" − 2:38
9. "Must Have Been the Devil" − 2:38
10. "Lightnin'" (Cotton) − 2:40
11. "I'm Ready" (Muddy Waters) − 3:03

== Personnel ==
- Otis Spann − vocals, piano
- Dirty Rivers − guitar
- James "Pee Wee" Madison − guitar
- James Cotton − harmonica, vocals
- Milton Rector − bass
- S. P. Leary – drums
