= Love Her =

Single by the Walker Brothers
- B-side: "The Seventh Dawn"
- Released: 9 April 1965
- Genre: Baroque pop
- Length: 3:23
- Label: Philips; Smash (US)
- Songwriter(s): Barry Mann, Cynthia Weil
- Producer(s): Nick Venet

The Walker Brothers singles chronology
"Pretty Girls Everywhere" (1965)	"Love Her" (1965)	"Make It Easy on Yourself" (1965)

"Love Her" is a song written by Barry Mann and Cynthia Weil which was first a song for the American singing duo the Everly Brothers in 1963 as the B-side to "The Girl Sang the Blues" and was later recorded and released by the American pop group the Walker Brothers as their second single in 1965. Doris Day released a lyrical variation entitled "Love Him" for her 1963 album of the same name.

The Walker Brothers' version is notable as it is the first single the group recorded with Scott Walker as the lead singer. Previously, John Walker was the main vocalist. The song was produced by Nick Venet and arranged by Phil Spector collaborator Jack Nitzsche, who gave the song a Wall of Sound treatment. "Love Her" became the group's first hit, spending thirteen weeks on the UK Singles Chart and peaking at #20 in June.

== Chart positions ==
Chart (1965)	Peak position
UK (Melody Maker)	22
UK (Record Retailer)	20
