= Feel Like Blowing My Horn =

Studio album by Roosevelt Sykes
- Released: 1973
- Recorded: August 10 & 11, 1970
- Studio: Sound Studios, Chicago
- Genre: Blues
- Length: 49:55
- Label: Delmark; DS-632
- Producer: Robert G. Koester

Roosevelt Sykes chronology
The Honeydripper's Duke's Mixture (1971)	Feel Like Blowing My Horn (1973)	Dirty Double Mother (1973)

Feel Like Blowing My Horn is an album by blues musician Roosevelt Sykes, recorded in 1970 and released by the Delmark label in 1973.

== Reception ==
Professional ratings
Review scores
Source	Rating
AllMusic	4.5/5 stars
The Encyclopedia of Popular Music	3/5 stars
The Penguin Guide to Blues Recordings	3/4 stars

AllMusic reviewer Eugene Chadbourne stated: "Producer Bob Koester gets kudos for bringing about a studio session for Sykes involving such a group later in his career. What a great combination of players is involved ... These legendary players hardly sit on their laurels; they use the opportunity to lay down really beautiful music, the rocking and fun-loving spirit of Sykes looking down on all of it like some kind of barbecue munching holy spirit. One of the best recordings on the Delmark label, and that is saying a mouthful".

== Track listing ==
All compositions by Roosevelt Sykes

1. "Feel Like Blowing My Horn" – 2:58
2. "My Hamstring's Poppin'" – 3:57
3. "I'm a Nut" – 3:00
4. "Blues Will Prank with Your Soul" – 3:27
5. "Sykes Gumboogie" – 4:40
6. "Rock-a-Bye Birdie" – 3:09
7. "Moving Blues" – 3:54
8. "All Days Are Good" – 2:41
9. "Eagle-Rock Me, Baby" – 3:11
10. "Jubilee Time" – 3:19

== Personnel ==
- Roosevelt Sykes – piano, vocals
- King Kolax – trumpet
- Sax Mallard – clarinet, tenor saxophone
- Robert Lockwood Jr. – guitar
- Dave Myers – bass
- Fred Below – drums
