= The Blues Is Where It's At =

Studio album by Otis Spann
- Released: 1966
- Recorded: August 30, 1966
- Studio: Cafe Au Go Go, Bleecker Street, New York City
- Genre: Blues
- Length: 31:40
- Label: BluesWay; BL/BLS 6003
- Producer: Bob Thiele

Otis Spann chronology
| Otis Spann's Chicago Blues (1966) | The Blues Is Where It's At (1966) | The Bottom of the Blues (1967) |

The Blues Is Where It's At is an album by blues pianist/vocalist Otis Spann recorded in 1966 and originally released by the BluesWay label.

Professional ratings
Review scores
| Source | Rating |
|---|---|
| AllMusic | 4.5/5 stars |

== Track listing ==
All compositions by Otis Spann except where noted

1. "Popcorn Man" (McKinley Morganfield) − 2:20
2. "Brand New House" (Bobby Darin, Woody Harris) − 3:04
3. "Chicago Blues" (Otis Spann, George Spink) − 3:19
4. "Steel Mill Blues" − 4:17
5. "Down On Sarah Street" − 3:05
6. "T'Aint Nobody's Bizness If I Do" (Porter Grainger, Clarence Williams, Robert Prince) − 3:52
7. "Nobody Knows Chicago Like I Do (Party Blues)" − 2:35
8. "My Home Is On the Delta" (Morganfield) − 3:12
9. "Spann Blues" − 4:28

== Personnel ==
- Otis Spann − piano, vocals
- George Smith − harmonica
- Luther Johnson, Muddy Waters, Sammy Lawhorn − guitar
- Mac Arnold − electric bass
- Francis Clay – drums

Technical

- Bob Arnold - engineer
- Joe Lebow - design
- Charles Shabacon - photography
