= Dirty Double Mother =

Studio album by Roosevelt Sykes
- Released: 1973
- Recorded: March 1973
- Studio: New Orleans
- Genre: Blues
- Length: 34:41
- Label: BluesWay; BLS-6077
- Producer: Al Smith

Roosevelt Sykes chronology
| Feel Like Blowing My Horn (1973) | Dirty Double Mother (1973) | The Original Honeydripper (1977) |

Dirty Double Mother is an album by blues musician Roosevelt Sykes recorded in 1973 and released by the BluesWay label. On the cover, the title is "Dirty Double Mother," while on the label, it is cited as "Double Dirty Mother," which is also the title of the first song.

== Reception ==
Professional ratings
Review scores
| Source | Rating |
|---|---|
| AllMusic | 4/5 stars |

AllMusic reviewer Arwulf Arwulf stated: " Roosevelt Sykes and producer Al Smith put together a particularly fine album of contemporary blues firmly anchored in a tradition that was approximately as old as Sykes himself. ... This modern, somewhat plugged-in band did an exceptionally good job of interacting with the old man, and the results are gratifying ... Find a copy of this album and consult with it regularly".

== Track listing ==
All compositions by Roosevelt Sykes

1. "Double Dirty Mother" – 3:08
2. "Persimmon Pie" – 2:37
3. "I Wanna Love" – 2:13
4. "Look a Here" – 2:23
5. "Jookin' in New Orleans" – 5:20
6. "May Be a Scandal" – 2:14
7. "Double Breasted Woman" – 3:37
8. "Dooky Chase Boogie" – 4:17
9. "Life Is a Puzzle" – 2:52
10. ".44 Rifle Blues" – 3:30
11. "Natch'l Go Getter" – 2:30

== Personnel ==
- Roosevelt Sykes – piano, vocals
- Clarence Ford – tenor saxophone
- Justin Adams – guitar
- George French – bass
- Alonzo Stewart – drums
