= House Rent Party =

1992 compilation of 1949 tracks by Sunnyland Slim and other artists

Compilation album by Sunnyland Slim featuring Jimmy Rogers, Willie Mabon and St. Louis Jimmy
- Released: 1992
- Recorded: August 26 & 28, 1949
- Studio: Chicago
- Genre: Blues
- Length: 34:27
- Label: Delmark; DD-655
- Producer: Robert G. Koester, Steve Wagner

House Rent Party is an album by the American blues pianist/vocalist Sunnyland Slim, compiling six recordings originally issued by Apollo Records with additional unreleased tracks from 1949 with Jimmy Rogers and St. Louis Jimmy and two tracks performed by Willie Mabon, that was released by the Delmark label in 1992.

== Reception ==
Professional ratings
Review scores
Source	Rating
Allmusic	4.5/5 stars
The Penguin Guide to Blues Recordings	3/4 stars

Allmusic reviewer Scott Yanow stated "From deep in the vaults of Apollo Records comes this sensational collection of 1949 artifacts by the veteran pianist, along with sides by singer St. Louis Jimmy, young pianist Willie Mabon, and two unissued sides by guitarist Jimmy Rogers ... all from the emerging heyday of the genre.".

== Track listing ==
All compositions by Albert Luandrew except where noted

1. "I'm Just a Lonesome Man" – 2:39
2. "Sad Old Sunday (Mother's Day)" – 2:01
3. "Boogie Man" (Willie Mabon) – 3:13
4. "Hard Time (When Mother's Gone)" – 2:43 previously unreleased
5. "Chicago Woman" – 2:54
6. "I'm in Love" – 2:33 previously unreleased
7. "Bad Times (Cost of Living)" – 2:53
8. "Nervous Breakdown" – 2:45 previously unreleased
9. "It Keeps Rainin'" (Willie Mabon) – 2:49
10. "Brown Skin Woman" – 2:36 previously unreleased
11. "Old Age Has Got Me" – 2:45 previously unreleased
12. "That's All Right" (Jimmy Rogers) – 2:27 previously unreleased
13. "Sad Old Sunday" [alternate take] – 3:30 previously unreleased
14. "I'm Just a Lonesome Man" [alternate take] – 2:50 previously unreleased
15. "Bad Times" [alternate take] – 2:47 previously unreleased

== Personnel ==
- Sunnyland Slim – piano, vocals (tracks 1, 2, 4-8 & 10–15)
- Jimmy Rogers – guitar, vocals (tracks 6 & 12)
- Willie Mabon – vocals, piano, harmonica (tracks 3 & 9)
- St. Louis Jimmy – vocals (tracks 2, 5, 8, 11 & 13)
- Sam Casimir (tracks 1, 2, 4, 5, 7, 8, 10, 11 & 13–15), Earl Dranes (tracks 3 & 9) – guitar
- Andrew Harris – bass (tracks 1, 2, 4-8 & 10–15)
