= The Biggest Thing Since Colossus =

Studio album by Otis Spann
- Released: 1969
- Recorded: January 9, 1969
- Studio: Tempo Sound Studio, New York City
- Genre: Blues
- Length: 40:04
- Label: Blue Horizon
- Producer: Mike Vernon

Otis Spann chronology
Cryin' Time (1969)	The Biggest Thing Since Colossus (1969)	Super Black Blues (1969)

Professional ratings
Review scores
Source	Rating
AllMusic	3/5 stars
The Penguin Guide to Blues Recordings	3.5/4 stars

The Biggest Thing Since Colossus is an album by American blues musician Otis Spann, released in 1969. The album is also notable for the fact that Spann's backing band on this occasion were members of Fleetwood Mac, who were touring in America at the time. Spann had been involved in the recording of the Blues Jam at Chess album, and a rapport had been struck between Spann and the British band, which led to their participation on Spann's new album.

It was agreed beforehand that Spann's friend and longtime associate S.P. Leary would play drums on the album, and Fleetwood Mac drummer Mick Fleetwood did not take part in the recording. Guitarists Peter Green and Danny Kirwan, and bassist John McVie all contributed to the sessions.

"Walkin'" was released as a single in some countries, with "Temperature Is Rising (98.8°F)" (a different version to that found on the album) on the B-side. Another track was recorded at the sessions, "Blues for Hippies", which was not included on the album. An expanded version was released in 2006 on a double CD (Otis Spann, The Complete Blue Horizon Sessions) with all tracks from the sessions plus the single "Bloody Murder" and both single and album versions of "Temperature is Rising".

== Track listing ==
All tracks written by Otis Spann except where indicated.

1. "My Love Depends on You" – 5:22
2. "Walkin' – 2:54
3. "It Was a Big Thing" – 3:26
4. "Temperature Is Rising (100.2°F)" – 6:13
5. "Dig You" – 3:04
6. "No More Doggin'" (Rosco Gordon) – 3:00
7. "Ain't Nobody's Business" (Jimmy Witherspoon) – 5:15
8. "She Needs Some Loving" – 3:08
9. "I Need Some Air" – 4:40
10. "Someday Baby" – 3:02

== Personnel ==
- Otis Spann – piano, vocals
- Peter Green – guitar
- Danny Kirwan – guitar
- John McVie – bass guitar
- S.P. Leary – drums

== Production ==
- Mike Vernon – producer
- Warren Slaten – engineer
- Richard Vernon – coordination
- Sleeve Design / Photography – Terence Ibbott
