= Len Kunstadt =

American scholar of jazz and blues music (1925–1996)

Leonard Richard "Len" Kunstadt (May 15, 1925 – April 23, 1996) was an American scholar of jazz and blues music, and a record label manager.

Len Kunstadt was born and raised in Brownsville, Brooklyn, New York City. He was the son of Morris Kunstadt, a violinist and chess master, and Sophie Sherry Kunstadt, a writer and assistant to band leader Edwin Franko Goldman. After serving in the U.S. Air Force in World War II, Lenny graduated from New York University and began his prolific study of jazz and blues music.

Also known as “Kazoo Papa," Len Kunstadt was the editor and publisher of Record Research magazine, which he founded in the late 1950s, devoted to documenting the recording sessions of historic jazz and blues recordings. Kunstadt continued as editor and publisher of the magazine until the year of his death. He also co-authored, with Sam Charters, Jazz - A History of the New York Scene.

In the mid-1950s, Kunstadt became the companion of Victoria Spivey, and together they created Spivey Records in 1960. He managed the label after her death in 1976. Kunstadt was also a charter member of Record Research Associates, a jazz collector and research organization which started in the 1940s in New York City and survived until the 1990s.

He died in 1996, aged 70. Rosalie Weiner, Kunstadt's sister, donated his papers and archival research to the Institute of Jazz Studies at Rutgers University. In 2001 he was posthumously awarded a Lifetime Achievement Award from the ARSC (Association for Recorded Sound Collections).
