= Cryin' Time =

Studio album by Otis Spann
- Released: 1969
- Recorded: March 7, 20 & 21, 1968
- Studio: Universal Recording, Chicago
- Genre: Blues
- Length: 35:23
- Label: Vanguard
- Producer: Sam Charters

Otis Spann chronology
The Bottom of the Blues (1968)	Cryin' Time (1969)	The Biggest Thing Since Colossus (1969)

Cryin' Time is an album by blues pianist and vocalist Otis Spann recorded in Chicago in 1968 and released by Vanguard Records.

== Reception ==
Professional ratings
Review scores
Source	Rating
AllMusic	2.5/5 stars
The Penguin Guide to Blues Recordings	2.5/4 stars

AllMusic reviewer Mark Allan writes "While the Muddy Waters sideman is best known for piano, his soulful organ steals the show on this late-'60s release. His singing is serviceable, helped by wife Lucille Spann on two cuts. Country Joe & the Fish co-founder Barry Melton plays lead guitar, with Luther "Guitar Junior" Johnson taking the second chair."

== Track listing ==
All compositions by Otis Spann except where noted

1. "Home to Mississippi" − 3:26
2. "Blues Is a Botheration" − 4:02
3. "You Said You'd Be on Time" (Spann, George Spink) − 4:46
4. "Cryin' Time" − 3:11
5. "Blind Man" (Traditional) − 3:18
6. "Some Day" − 4:35
7. "Twisted Snake" − 3:02
8. "Green Flowers" (McKinley Morganfield) − 3:44
9. "The New Boogaloo" − 2:09
10. "Mule Kicking in My Stall" − 3:30

== Personnel ==
- Otis Spann − vocals, piano, organ
- Barry Melton − lead guitar
- Luther "Guitar Junior" Johnson − second guitar
- Jos Davidson − bass
- Lonnie Taylor − drums
- Lucille Spann − backing vocals (tracks 5 & 6)

Technical

- Michael Chechik - co-producer
