= Hannah Sylvester =

American singer

Hannah Sylvester (January 19, 1903 – October 15, 1973) was an American blues singer who performed in the classic female blues style, which was popular during the 1920s. She was billed as "Harlem's Mae West".

== Biography ==
Sylvester was born in Philadelphia, Pennsylvania, and sang and danced from the age of three. She is thought to have moved to New York City about 1920. In the early 1920s she appeared at the Paradise Cafe in Atlantic City, New Jersey. In 1923 she recorded eleven sides with the Fletcher Henderson Orchestra. Thereafter she toured the theater circuit in vaudeville shows throughout the 1920s. In the early 1930s she appeared in numerous revues in New York City. In 1931 she performed with the Fletcher Henderson Orchestra at the Howard Theater, in Washington, D.C., for broadcast on WSJV radio. She toured with the Snooky Russell Orchestra in 1940.

By the early 1950s Sylvester worked primarily outside music; she tended bar at the Celebrity Club in New York City and occasionally sang there with the Buddy Tate Band. She appeared in the X-Glamour Girls revue in New York City in 1962. In that year she recorded for Victoria Spivey's Spivey Records.

Sylvester died in New York City on October 15, 1973.
