= Otis Spann Is the Blues =

Studio album by Otis Spann
- Released: January 1961
- Recorded: August 23, 1960
- Studio: Fine Recording, NYC
- Genre: Blues
- Length: 44:40
- Label: Candid; CJM/CJS 9001
- Producer: Nat Hentoff

Otis Spann chronology
Otis Spann Is the Blues (1961)	The Blues of Otis Spann (1964)

Otis Spann Is the Blues is an album by the blues pianist and vocalist Otis Spann. It was released in January 1961 through Candid Records. The recording was made in New York in 1960.

== Reception ==
Professional ratings
Review scores
Source	Rating
AllMusic	5/5 stars
The Penguin Guide to Blues Recordings	4/4 stars
DownBeat	4/5 stars

AllMusic reviewer Ron Wynn stated: "Spann provided wonderful, imaginative, tasty piano solos and better-than-average vocals, and was arguably the best player whose style was more restrained than animated. Not that he couldn't rock the house, but Spann's forte was making you think as well as making you dance, and the tracks on Otis Spann Is the Blues will do both".

John Wilson assigned the album 4 stars in his DownBeat review. He wrote, "Spann plays compelling, pungent piano accompaniment to his own singing and to Lockwood’s as well and the two men team up for an unusual mixture of starkness and polish in their accompaniment to Lockwood’s singing of My Daily Wish. Between them, they have put together an attractive collection of strongly projected, un-gimmicked blues that draw heavily on the basic essentials of the style".

== Track listing ==
All compositions by Otis Spann except where noted

1. "The Hard Way" − 5:02
2. "Take a Little Walk with Me" (Robert Lockwood Jr.) − 3:25
3. "Otis in the Dark" − 4:32
4. "Little Boy Blue" (Lockwood) − 3:38
5. "Country Boy" − 4:24
6. "Beat-Up Team" − 5:59
7. "My Daily Wish" (Lockwood) − 4:26
8. "Great Northern Stomp" − 4:15
9. "I Got Rumbling On My Mind #2" (Lockwood) − 4:02
10. "Worried Life Blues" − 4:20

== Personnel ==
- Otis Spann − vocals, piano
- Robert Lockwood Jr. − guitar, vocals
