= Super Black Blues =

1969 album by Super Black Blues Band

Studio album by Super Black Blues Band featuring Otis Spann, Joe Turner and T-Bone Walker
- Released: 1969
- Recorded: October 17, 1969
- Studio: Los Angeles, California
- Genre: Blues
- Length: 37:04
- Label: BluesTime; BTS-9003
- Producer: Bob Thiele

T-Bone Walker chronology
Everyday I Have the Blues (1969)	Super Black Blues (1969)	Fly Walker Airlines (1972)

Big Joe Turner chronology
The Real Boss of the Blues (1969)	Super Black Blues (1969)	Turns On the Blues (1970)

Otis Spann chronology
The Biggest Thing Since Colossus (1969)	Super Black Blues (1969)	Sweet Giant of the Blues (1969)

Super Black Blues is an album by the Super Black Blues Band featuring Otis Spann, Joe Turner and T-Bone Walker recorded in Los Angeles in 1969 and originally released by the BluesTime label. Bob Fisher of Creem called it "probably the only genuine spontaneous blues jam ever committed to wax."

== Background ==
Walker, Turner and Spann were artists who went with A&R executive Bob Thiele when he departed ABC Records to launch Flying Dutchman Records and its subsidiary label BluesTime. Super Black Blues, in the words of critic Paul McGuinness, came about when Thiele "[assembled] a band of seriously good players, give them some fine material and leave them to get on with it, with nothing but an experienced producer to get in the way."

Bob Fisher Creem deems it a "superb", authentic impromptu blues jam session whose looseness is best exemplified by incidents at each end of the album. On "Paris", Walker, who is "obviously composing the lyrics from the top of his head", initially describes Paris as a good place to be, then a "no-good place to be" in a second couplet, causing Turner to curtly exclaim during Walker's singing, "Can't say that, gotta be one thing or the other." Fisher writes: "On any normal session such unprofessional behavior would result in another take. But, then, this is no ordinary record." At the end of "Blues Jam", Turner sings to Walker that his time is running out, to which Walker returns with a "devastating" guitar run, in turn inspiring Spann to play heavily and for the others to follow his lead.

== Reception ==
Professional ratings
Review scores
Source	Rating
AllMusic	3/5 stars
Record Collector	3/5 stars

AllMusic reviewer Stephen Thomas Erlewine stated "The emphasis on improvisation and long grooves certainly made Super Black Blues different than the original '40s and '50s sides by Walker, Turner, and Spann -- those were restricted by technology and taste -- and it's fun to hear them stretch out ... This does mean Super Black Blues is a bit dated and a bit of an anomaly in the catalogs of Walker, Spann, and Turner, but time has turned this into an amiable detour: not the first record to hear by any of these three by any means, but it's fun to hear the giants find common ground".

Robert Christgau reflected in The Village Voice that Super Black Blues was "an extraordinary mellow studio jam" that found Walker, Turner and Spann "in good humor and good voice", making it a unique document. McGuinness deemed it to be partly an exercise in "willy-waving" in his Record Collector review, noting 'rock'n'roll shouter' Turner's new bluesier voice and calling Walker "a legend of post-war electric blues" and Spann perhaps Chicago's best pianist. McGuinness notes how the musicians stretch each of the four tracks to extreme length as the musicians and singers "trade breaks and verses", the result of their relaxing musical interplay. In a guide to Walker's work, Alice Clark Classic Rock praised the album as a collection of four city blues that mixes the styles of Kansas City, Chicago and Texas, with the three Walker-authored songs capturing a band "perfectly poised as conversations flow between voice, guitar and piano", with the other song, the cover of "Here I Am Broken Hearted", being "an exercise in intuition."

== Track listing ==
All compositions by T-Bone Walker except where noted

1. "Paris Blues" − 14:03
2. "Here Am I Broken Hearted" (Buddy DeSylva, Lew Brown, Ray Henderson) − 3:47
3. "Jot's Blues" − 8:15
4. "Blues Jam" − 10:59

== Personnel ==
- T-Bone Walker − vocals, guitar
- Joe Turner − vocals
- Otis Spann − vocals, piano
- Ernie Watts − tenor saxophone
- George "Harmonica" Smith − harmonica
- Arthur Wright − guitar
- Ron Brown − bass
- Paul Humphrey – drums
