= Otis Spann's Chicago Blues =

Studio album by Otis Spann
- Released: 1966
- Recorded: November 22, 1965 and undated 1965 session
- Studio: Chicago
- Genre: Blues
- Length: 42:24
- Label: Testament; T-2211
- Producer: Pete Welding

Otis Spann chronology
| The Blues Never Die! (1965) | Otis Spann's Chicago Blues (1966) | The Blues Is Where It's At (1966) |

Nobody Knows My Troubles Cover

Otis Spann's Chicago Blues (also released as Nobody Knows My Troubles) is an album by blues pianist and vocalist Otis Spann recorded in Chicago at two sessions in 1965 and released by the Testament label.

== Reception ==
Professional ratings
Review scores
| Source | Rating |
|---|---|
| AllMusic | 3/5 stars |
| The Penguin Guide to Blues Recordings | 3.5/4 stars |

AllMusic reviewer Richie Unterberger stated "divided between solo piano performances and pieces with a full band ... The variation in approach means that this isn't the most consistent Spann album, and the material and performances don't rank among his best either, although they're reasonably solid".

== Track listing ==
All compositions by Otis Spann except where noted

1. "Get Your Hands Out of My Pocket" − 2:30
2. "Nobody Knows My Troubles" − 3:20
3. "Sarah Street" − 3:22
4. "Worried Life Blues" (Big Maceo Merriweather) − 2:00
5. "You Can't Hide" − 2:33
6. "Jack-Knife" − 2:52
7. "What's On Your Worried Mind?" − 2:24
8. "Vicksburg Blues" − 4:32
9. "Who's Out There?" − 2:30
10. "Spann's Boogie Woogie" − 2:10
11. "See See Rider" (Ma Rainey) − 2:59
12. "Lovin' You" − 3:23
13. "One Room Country Shack" (Mercy Dee Walton) − 2:43
14. "Mr. Jelly Roll Baker" − 3:02

== Personnel ==
- Otis Spann − vocals, piano, organ
- James Cotton − harmonica (tracks 1–3, 6, 9 & 12)
- Johnny Young − guitar (tracks 1–3, 6, 9 & 12)
- Jimmy Lee Morris − bass (tracks 1–3, 6, 9 & 12)
- S. P. Leary (tracks 1–3, 6, 9 & 12), Robert Whitehead (track 8) – drums
