= Sweet Giant of the Blues =

Studio album by Otis Spann
- Released: 1970
- Recorded: August 13, 1969
- Studio: New York City
- Genre: Blues
- Length: 38:31
- Labels: BluesTime; BT 29006
- Producer: Bob Thiele

Otis Spann chronology
Super Black Blues (1969)	Sweet Giant of the Blues (1970)	Walking the Blues (1972)

Sweet Giant of the Blues is an album by blues pianist and vocalist Otis Spann recorded in New York in 1969 and released by the BluesTime label.

== Reception ==
Professional ratings
Review scores
Source	Rating
AllMusic	3/5 stars

AllMusic reviewer Stephen Thomas Earlewine stated "Sweet Giant of the Blues, a 1969 session for Bluestime released in 1970, is one of his very last albums and if it can't be called definitive, it's nevertheless a robust example of his gifts. ... This is loose and unpredictable in a predictable fashion, delving into a little bit of Latin beats and rhumba and a whole lot of rock & roll ... Spann seems to seize the changes and enjoys playing with the band, never trying to play against his support".

== Track listing ==
All compositions by Otis Spann except where noted

1. "Got My Mojo Working" (McKinley Morganfield) − 3:03
2. "Sellin' My Thing" − 7:23
3. "Moon Blues" (Bob Thiele, George David Weiss) − 4:26
4. "I'm a Dues Payin' Man" (Jim Rein) − 3:10
5. "I Wonder Why" − 4:22
6. "Bird in a Cage" − 6:06
7. "Hey Baby" − 5:38
8. "Make a Way" − 4:23

== Personnel ==
- Otis Spann − vocals, piano
- Tom Scott − tenor saxophone, flute
- Louis Shelton − guitar
- Max Bennett − bass guitar
- Paul Humphrey − drums
- Mike Anthony − banjo, guitar (tracks 1, 3, 4 & 8)
