= Lonely Winds =

Single by The Drifters

from the album The Drifters' Greatest Hits
- B-side: "Hey Senorita"
- Released: May 1960
- Genre: Doo-wop
- Length: 2:45
- Label: Atlantic; 2062
- Songwriters: Doc Pomus, Mort Shuman
- Producer: Jerry Leiber and Mike Stoller

The Drifters singles chronology
"This Magic Moment" (January 28, 1960)	"Lonely Winds" (1960)	"Save the Last Dance for Me" (August 1960)

"Lonely Winds" is a song written by Doc Pomus and Mort Shuman and performed by The Drifters . The recording features Ben E. King on the lead vocals. In 1960, the track reached No. 9 on the U.S. R&B chart and No. 54 on the U.S. pop chart.

It was featured on their 1960 album, The Drifters' Greatest Hits.

The Walker Brothers included a version of the song on their 1965 debut album Take It Easy with the Walker Brothers.
