= St. Louis Jimmy Oden =

American blues musician and songwriter (1903–1977)

- Oden in 1959

Background information
- Born: James Burke Oden; June 26, 1903; Nashville, Tennessee, U.S.
- Origin: St. Louis, Missouri, U.S.
- Died: December 30, 1977 (aged 74) Chicago, Illinois, U.S.
- Genres: Blues
- Occupations: Musician; songwriter
- Instruments: Piano; vocals
- Years active: 1920s–1970s
- Labels: Bluebird; Aristocrat; J.O.B.; Bluesville

James Burke "St. Louis Jimmy" Oden (June 26, 1903 – December 30, 1977) was an American blues musician and songwriter.

== Biography ==
Oden was born in Nashville, Tennessee, United States. His parents were Henry Oden, a dancer, and Leana West, although both had died before their son reached the age of eight. He sang and taught himself to play the piano in childhood. In his teens, he left home for St. Louis, where piano-based blues was prominent. He developed his vocal talents and began performing with the pianist Roosevelt Sykes. After more than ten years playing in and around St. Louis, in 1933 he and Sykes moved to Chicago.

In Chicago, he was nicknamed St. Louis Jimmy and had a solid performing and recording career for the next four decades. Chicago became his home, but Oden traveled with blues players throughout the United States. He recorded many records, his best-known being the 1941 Bluebird release "Goin' Down Slow". Oden's songs "Take the Bitter with the Sweet" and "Soon Forgotten" were recorded by his friend Muddy Waters.

"Florida Hurricane" was released in 1948 on Aristocrat Records. The song featured Muddy Waters on guitar and Sunnyland Slim on piano. In 1949, Oden partnered with Joe Brown to form a small recording company, J.O.B. Records. Oden appears to have ended his involvement within a year, but with other partners the company remained in business until 1974.

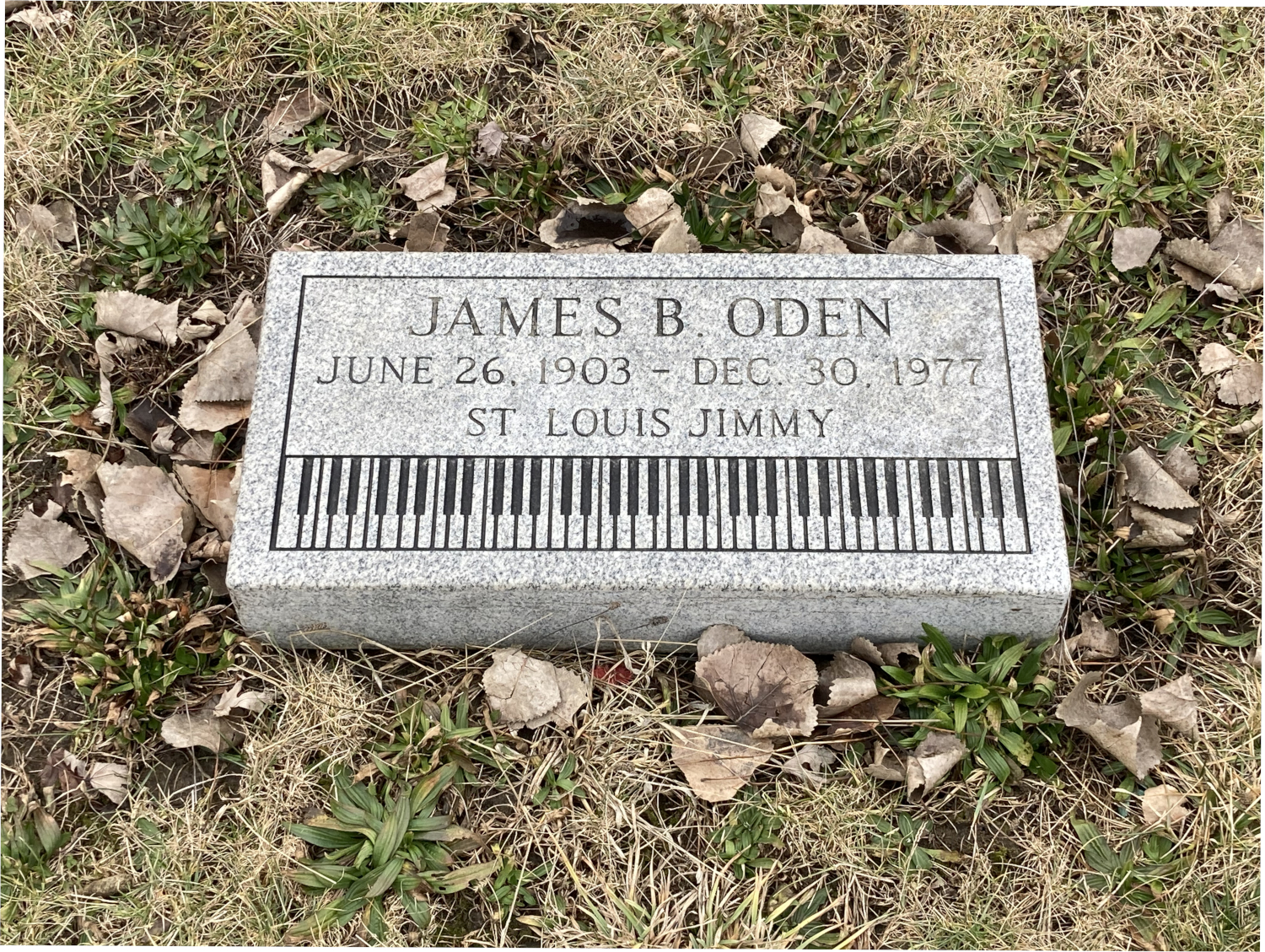
Oden's grave at Restvale Cemetery

He spent less time performing after being in a car crash in 1957. Songs written later in his career include "What a Woman!" Oden released the album Goin' Down Slow on Prestige-Bluesville in 1960. He performed as a vocalist on three songs recorded for an Otis Spann session in 1960. These tracks were released on the album Walking the Blues, re-released as a Candid CD (CCD 79025) in 1989.

Oden died of bronchopneumonia in 1977, at the age of 74 in Chicago. He was interred in Restvale Cemetery, in Alsip, Illinois, near Chicago. In 2013 the Killer Blues Headstone Project placed a headstone there for him (pictured right).

== Discography ==
=== As leader ===
- I Have Made up my Mind (Champion, 1932)
- Goin’ Down Slow (Prestige Bluesville, 1961)

=== As guest ===
With Otis Spann

- Walking the Blues (Barnaby, 1960 [1972])

With Sunnyland Slim

- House Rent Party (Delmark, 1947 [1992])

== See also ==
- List of blues musicians
