= George "Harmonica" Smith =

American electric blues harmonica player (1924-1983)

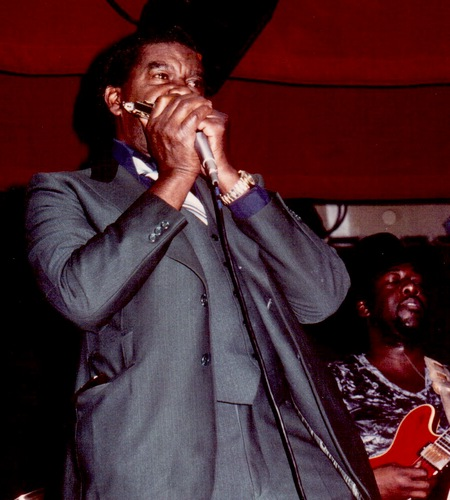
- Smith in 1980

Background information
- Also known as: George "Harmonica" Smith, Little George Smith, Harmonica King, Little Walter Junior, George Allen
- Born: Allen George Smith; April 22, 1924; West Helena, Arkansas, U.S.
- Died: October 2, 1983 (aged 59) Los Angeles, California, U.S.
- Genres: Blues, electric blues
- Occupation: Musician
- Instruments: Harmonica, vocals
- Years active: 1950s–1980s

George "Harmonica" Smith (born Allen George Smith, April 22, 1924 – October 2, 1983) was an American electric blues harmonica player. Apart from his solo recordings, Smith is best known for his work backing both Muddy Waters and Big Mama Thornton.

== Life and career ==
Born in West Helena, Arkansas, United States, but brought up in Cairo, Illinois, Smith's mother taught him how to play the harmonica from the age of four. In his teenage years he performed in a country band with Early Woods and Curtis Gould. He also joined Mississippi gospel group, the Jackson Jubilee Singers. From the late 1930s and into the 1940s, Smith travelled throughout the south and played harmonica on the streets. In 1941, Smith moved to Rock Island, Illinois and joined a group with drummer Francis Clay. Around this time he was working at the Dixie theatre and began to use an amplifier he had salvaged from an old projector to amplify his harmonica playing on the streets.

He moved to Chicago and began playing professionally in 1951. He joined the Muddy Waters' band in 1954 and played intermittently with that group. During this period he also worked with Otis Rush. In the mid 1950s he recorded several singles for the RPM/Modern label under the name Little George Smith. In 1955, Smith went on tour with Little Willie John and Champion Jack Dupree, recording several songs with latter while in Cincinnati. Smith relocated to Los Angeles, where the tour ended, later that year. In the late 1950s, Smith recorded singles under various aliases, such as Harmonica King and Little Walter Jr., for labels J & M, Lapel, Melker, and Caddy. In 1960 he recorded 10 singles under the alias George Allen for the Sotoplay and Carolyn labels. In 1966, Smith worked with Muddy Waters while Waters was visiting the West Coast and recorded for the Spivey label. Smith played with Bacon Fat, a blues group, before working with Big Mama Thornton in the 1970s. He played harmonica on her live album Jail in 1975.

Smith spent most of his life living on the West Coast, where he influenced musicians such as William Clarke and Rod Piazza. Smith died in 1983 in Los Angeles, California, at the age of 59 of heart failure.

== Selected discography ==
- 1969: Blues with a Feeling: A Tribute to Little Walter (World Pacific Records; CD reissue: BGO/Beat Goes On)
- 1969: ...Of The Blues (Bluesway Records; CD reissue: BGO/Beat Goes On)
- 1970: No Time For Jive (Blue Horizon Records)
- 1971: Arkansas Trap (Deram Records)
- 1976: Blowin' The Blues (P-Vine Special)
- 1978: Harmonica Blues King (Dobre Records)
- 1982: Boogie'n With George (Murray Brothers Records)
- 1983: Pick Your Choice (Shoe Label)
- 1993: Harmonica Ace (The Modern Masters) (Ace Records; Flair/Virgin Records)
- 1998: Now You Can Talk About Me (Blind Pig Records)
- 2011: Teardrops Are Falling (Electro-Fi Records)
- 2024: Oopin' California Blues (1954-1962) (Jasmine Records)

With Otis Spann

- The Blues Is Where It's At (BluesWay, 1966)

With the Super Black Blues Band: T-Bone Walker, Otis Spann and Big Joe Turner

- Super Black Blues (BluesTime, 1969)
