= Eugene Church =

Eugene Church (January 22, 1938 – April 3, 1993) was an American R&B singer and songwriter.

Church was born in St. Louis, Missouri. In the 1950s, he collaborated with Jesse Belvin releasing singles on Modern Records as The Cliques. Their 1956 single, "The Girl in My Dreams" b/w "I Wanna Know Why", peaked at No. 45 on the Billboard Hot 100.

Late in the 1950s, he released four singles of his own, as Eugene Church & the Fellows. The first two were U.S. hits: "Pretty Girls Everywhere" went No. 6 R&B, No. 36 Pop, and "Miami" hit No. 14 R&B and No. 67 Pop. They were followed by "Good News" and "Mind Your Own Business", neither of which charted. Church later pursued a career in gospel music in Dallas, Texas, and returned to secular music in the 1990s in doo-wop revues.

Church died from cancer in Los Angeles, California in April 1993, at age 55.

== Discography ==
- Modern Records 987 - '"Girl of My Dreams" / "I Wanna Know Why" 1956
- Modern Records 995 - "I'm in Love (With a Girl)" / "My Desire" 1956
- Specialty Records 604 - "Open Up Your Heart" / "How Long" 1957
- Contender Records - "It's True" (with The Hollywood Saxons) 1958
- Knight Records 2012 - "Deacon Dan Tucker" / "Little Darling" 1958
- Class Records 235 - "Pretty Girls Everywhere" / "For the Rest of My Life" 1958
- Class Records 254 - "Miami" / "I Ain't Goin' For That" 1959
- Class Records 261 - "Jack of All Trades" / "Without Soul" 1959
- Class Records 266 - "The Struttin' Kind" / "That's What's Happnin'" 1960
- Rendezvous 132 - "Good News" / "Polly" 1960
- King Records 5545 - "Mind Your Own Business" / "You Got the Right Idea" 1961
- King Records 5589 - "That's All I Want" / "Geneva" 1962
- King Records 5610 - "Light of the Moon" / "I'm Your Taboo Man" 1962
- King Records 5659 - "The Right Girl, the Right Time" / "Pretty Baby Won't You Come on Home" 1962
- King Records 5715 - "Time Has Brought About a Change" / "Sixteen Tons" 1963
