= Paul Oscher =

American musician (1947–2021)

- Oscher (right) with Muddy Waters (left) in London, 1968

Background information
- Birth name: Paul Allan Oscher
- Born: February 26, 1947; New York City, U.S.
- Died: April 18, 2021 (aged 74); Austin, Texas, U.S.
- Genres: Blues
- Occupation: Musician
- Instruments: Harmonica; guitar; piano; vocals
- Years active: 1962–2021
- Website: www.pauloscher.com

Paul Allan Oscher (February 26, 1947 – April 18, 2021) was an American blues singer, songwriter, and instrumentalist. Primarily a harmonica player, he was the first permanent white member of Muddy Waters' band.

== Early life ==
Oscher was born in Brooklyn, New York City. He began playing harmonica at the age of 12, and began playing professionally at 15 with Little Jimmy Mae. He named John Lee Williamson as a major influence.

== Career ==
Oscher met Muddy Waters in the mid-1960s. After Big Walter Horton failed to show up for a gig, Oscher played harmonica as a member of the Muddy Waters Blues Band from 1967 until 1972. He was the first white musician in Muddy's band, and lived in Muddy's house on Chicago's South Side, where Oscher shared the basement with the blues pianist Otis Spann. Oscher recorded with Muddy for Chess Records.

After performing solo for a time in New York as "Brooklyn Slim", he toured Europe in 1976 with Louisiana Red. They both appeared at the WDR-TV music show, Rockpalast. During the 1990s, Oscher worked as a multi-instrumentalist, playing piano, guitar and harmonica, sometimes as a one-man band. He recorded an album in 1995, The Deep Blues of Paul Oscher. In 1999, he played with Big Bill Morganfield on his debut album, Rising Son.

In 2003, Oscher was featured on harmonica, guitar and vocals on Hubert Sumlin's album, About Them Shoes, along with Keith Richards, Eric Clapton and Levon Helm. In 2006, Oscher collaborated with Mos Def and recorded the song, "Bed Stuy Parade and Funeral March", on Mos Def's album, The New Danger. In 2008, he recorded with Keb' Mo' on the soundtrack of a film about the blues, Who Do You Love?.

== Personal life and death ==
Oscher was married to the Pulitzer Prize-winning playwright, Suzan-Lori Parks, from 2001 to 2011.

He died on April 18, 2021, in Austin, his home city for the last years of his life, after several weeks hospitalized with COVID-19 during the COVID-19 pandemic in Texas. He was 74.

== Awards ==
2006: Blues Music Awards:

- "Acoustic Artist of the Year"
- "Acoustic Album of the Year"

2000: LA Music Awards

- "Best Performance by Blues Musician"

== Discography ==
As a solo artist

- Knockin' On The Devil's Door (Viceroots, 1996)
- The Deep Blues Of Paul Oscher (Blues Planet, 1996)
- Living Legends Deep In The Blues (Blues Leaf, 2000)
- Alone With The Blues (Electro-Fi, 2004)
- Down In The Delta (Blues Fidelity, 2005)
- Bet On The Blues (Blues Fidelity, 2010)
- Cool Cat (Blues Fidelity, 2018)

With Muddy Waters

- After the Rain (Chess, 1969)
- Live at Mr. Kelly's (Chess, 1971)
- "Unk" in Funk (Chess, 1974)
