= Luther "Guitar Junior" Johnson =

American singer-songwriter (1939–2022)

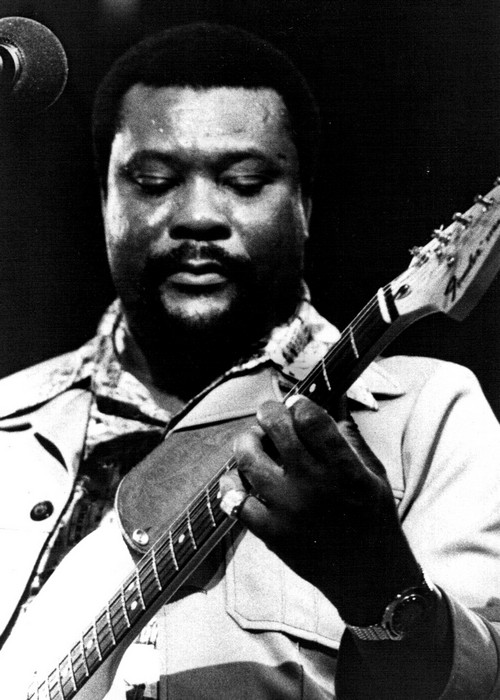
- Johnson in 1976

Background information
- Born: April 11, 1939; Itta Bena, Mississippi, U.S.
- Died: December 25, 2022 (aged 83) Oxford, Florida, U.S.
- Genres: Chicago blues
- Occupation: Musician
- Instruments: Guitar; vocals
- Years active: 1960s–2022
- Labels: Bullseye Blues; Alligator; Telarc

Luther "Guitar Junior" Johnson (April 11, 1939 – December 25, 2022) was an American blues singer and guitarist.

== Career ==
Born in Itta Bena, Mississippi, Johnson moved to Chicago with his family in 1955. During the 1960s, he performed with Magic Sam. He performed in Muddy Waters' band from 1972 to 1980. In 1980, four of his songs were included in an anthology released by Alligator Records. That same year he appeared as a member of the Legendary Blues Band, backing John Lee Hooker in the movie The Blues Brothers.

Johnson moved to the East Coast and began fronting his own band, the Magic Rockers. His "Walkin' the Dog" was recorded live at the Montreux Festival's Blues Night. He won a Grammy Award in 1985 for Best Traditional Blues Album for his part in Blues Explosion. He recorded three albums released by Telarc Records: Slammin’ on the West Side (1996), Got to Find a Way (1998), and Talkin' About Soul (2001). He also performed on three albums by the Nighthawks.

Johnson lived in Antrim, New Hampshire for many years but moved to Florida in 2017. He died on December 25, 2022, at the age of 83 and is survived by his wife, Lottie.

== Discography ==
- Ma Bea's Rock (1975) (with Jimmy Johnson)
- Luther's Blues (1977)
- I Changed (1979)
- Doin’ the Sugar Too (1984)
- I Want to Groove With You (1990)
- It’s Good to be Me (1992)
- Country Sugar Papa (1994)
- Slammin on the West Side (1996)
- Got to Find a Way (1998)
- Talkin' About Soul (2001)
