= Otis Spann =

American blues pianist (c.1924–1970)

Background information
- Born: March 21, 1924 or 1930; Belzoni or Jackson, Mississippi, U.S.
- Died: April 24, 1970 (aged 40 or 46) Chicago, Illinois, U.S.
- Genre: Chicago blues
- Occupation: Musician
- Instruments: Piano, vocals
- Years active: 1944–1970
- Labels: Decca, Chess, Storyville, Testament, Bluesway, Vanguard, CBS/Blue Horizon

Otis Spann (March 21, 1924, or 1930 – April 24, 1970) was an American blues musician many consider the leading postwar Chicago blues pianist.

== Early life ==
Sources differ over Spann's early years. Some state that he was born in Jackson, Mississippi, in 1930, but researchers Bob Eagle and Eric LeBlanc concluded, based on census records and other official information, that he was born in 1924 in Belzoni, Mississippi.

Spann's father was, according to some sources, a pianist called Friday Ford. His mother, Josephine Erby, was a guitarist who had worked with Memphis Minnie and Bessie Smith, and his stepfather, Frank Houston Spann, was a preacher and musician. One of five children, Spann began playing the piano at seven, with some instruction from Friday Ford, Frank Spann, and Little Brother Montgomery.

== Career ==
By age 14, he was playing in bands in the Jackson area. He moved to Chicago in 1946, where Big Maceo Merriweather mentored him. Spann performed solo with the guitarist Morris Pejoe, working a regular spot at the Tic Toc Lounge. Spann was known for his distinctive piano style. He became Muddy Waters' piano player in late 1952 and participated in his first recording session with the band on September 24, 1953. He played on many of Muddy Waters' most famous songs, including the blues standards "Hoochie Coochie Man," "I'm Ready," and "Got My Mojo Working." During his tenure with the group, he continued to record as a solo artist and session player with other musicians, including Bo Diddley and Howlin' Wolf. He stayed with Muddy Waters until 1968.

Spann's work for Chess Records includes the 1954 single "It Must Have Been the Devil," backed with "Five Spot," with B.B. King and Jody Williams on guitars. Sometimes, he is credited for playing piano on a couple of Chuck Berry songs, including "You Can't Catch Me" (1956), but others indicate that it could have been Berry's regular pianist Johnnie Johnson. In 1956, he recorded two unreleased tracks with Big Walter Horton and Robert Lockwood. He recorded a session with the guitarist Robert Lockwood, Jr. and vocalist St. Louis Jimmy in New York on August 23, 1960, which was issued on the albums Otis Spann Is the Blues and Walking the Blues. A 1963 session, Good Morning Mr. Blues, for Storyville Records was recorded in Copenhagen. He worked with Muddy Waters and Eric Clapton on recordings for Decca and with James Cotton for Prestige in 1964.

The Blues Is Where It's At, Spann's 1966 album for ABC-Bluesway, includes contributions from George "Harmonica" Smith, Muddy Waters, and Sammy Lawhorn. The Bottom of the Blues (1967), featuring Spann's wife, Lucille Spann (June 23, 1938 – August 2, 1994), was released by Bluesway. He worked on albums with Buddy Guy, Big Mama Thornton, Peter Green, and Fleetwood Mac in the late 1960s. In 2012, Silk City Records released Someday, featuring live and studio performances from 1967 produced by the blues guitarist Son Lewis.

DVD recordings of Spann include his performances at the Newport Jazz Festival (1960), the American Folk Blues Festival (1963), the Blues Masters (1966), and the Copenhagen Jazz Festival (1968).

== Death ==
Spann's grave at Burr Oak Cemetery

Spann died of liver cancer in Chicago in 1970. He was buried in Burr Oak Cemetery in Alsip, Illinois. His grave was unmarked for almost 30 years until Steve Salter (president of the Killer Blues Headstone Project) wrote a letter to Blues Revue magazine, saying, "This piano great is lying in an unmarked grave. Let's do something about this deplorable situation". Blues enthusiasts from around the world sent donations to purchase a headstone. On June 6, 1999, the marker was unveiled in a private ceremony. The stone is inscribed, "Otis played the deepest blues we ever heard – He'll play forever in our hearts".

== Legacy ==
In 1970, the Ann Arbor Blues and Jazz Festival site was named "Otis Spann Memorial Field." In 1972, Village Voice critic Robert Christgau called Spann "the greatest modern blues pianist." He later included Spann's 1972 Barnaby compilation Walking the Blues in "A Basic Record Library" of 1950s and 1960s music, published in Christgau's Record Guide: Rock Albums of the Seventies (1981).

Spann was posthumously elected to the Blues Hall of Fame in 1980. On November 13, 2012, Spann (along with cousin and fellow pianist Little Johnnie Jones) received a Mississippi Blues Trail Marker plaque, erected at 547 South Roach Street in Jackson, Mississippi, where the family lived in the 1930s and 1940s.

== Discography ==
- Otis Spann Is the Blues (Candid, 1961)
- Good Morning Mr. Blues (1963)
- The Blues of Otis Spann (Decca, 1964)
- The Blues Never Die! (Prestige, 1965)
- Chicago/The Blues/Today!, vol. 1 (Vanguard, 1966); split release with other artists)
- Otis Spann's Chicago Blues (Testament, 1966), also released as Nobody Knows My Troubles
- The Blues Is Where It's At (BluesWay, 1966)
- The Bottom of the Blues (BluesWay, 1968)
- Cryin' Time (Vanguard, 1969)
- The Biggest Thing Since Colossus (Blue Horizon, 1969)
- The Everlasting Blues vs. Otis Spann (Spivey, 1969)
- Up in the Queen's Pad (Spivey, 1969)
- Super Black Blues (BluesTime, 1969) with T-Bone Walker and Joe Turner
- Sweet Giant of the Blues (BluesTime, 1970)
- Walking the Blues (Barnaby, 1960 [1972])
- Heart Loaded with Trouble (BluesWay, 1973) - compilation
- Otis Rides Again (Piccadilly, 1980)
- Last Call: Live at Boston Tea Party (recorded 1970, released 2000)
- I Wanna Go Home (recorded 1964–69, released 2003)
- Complete Blue Horizon Sessions (recorded 1969, released 2006)
- Someday... (recorded 1967, released 2012)

== See also ==
- Chicago blues
- List of blues musicians
- List of people from Mississippi
- List of Storyville Records artists
