= Roosevelt Sykes =

American blues musician (1906–1983)

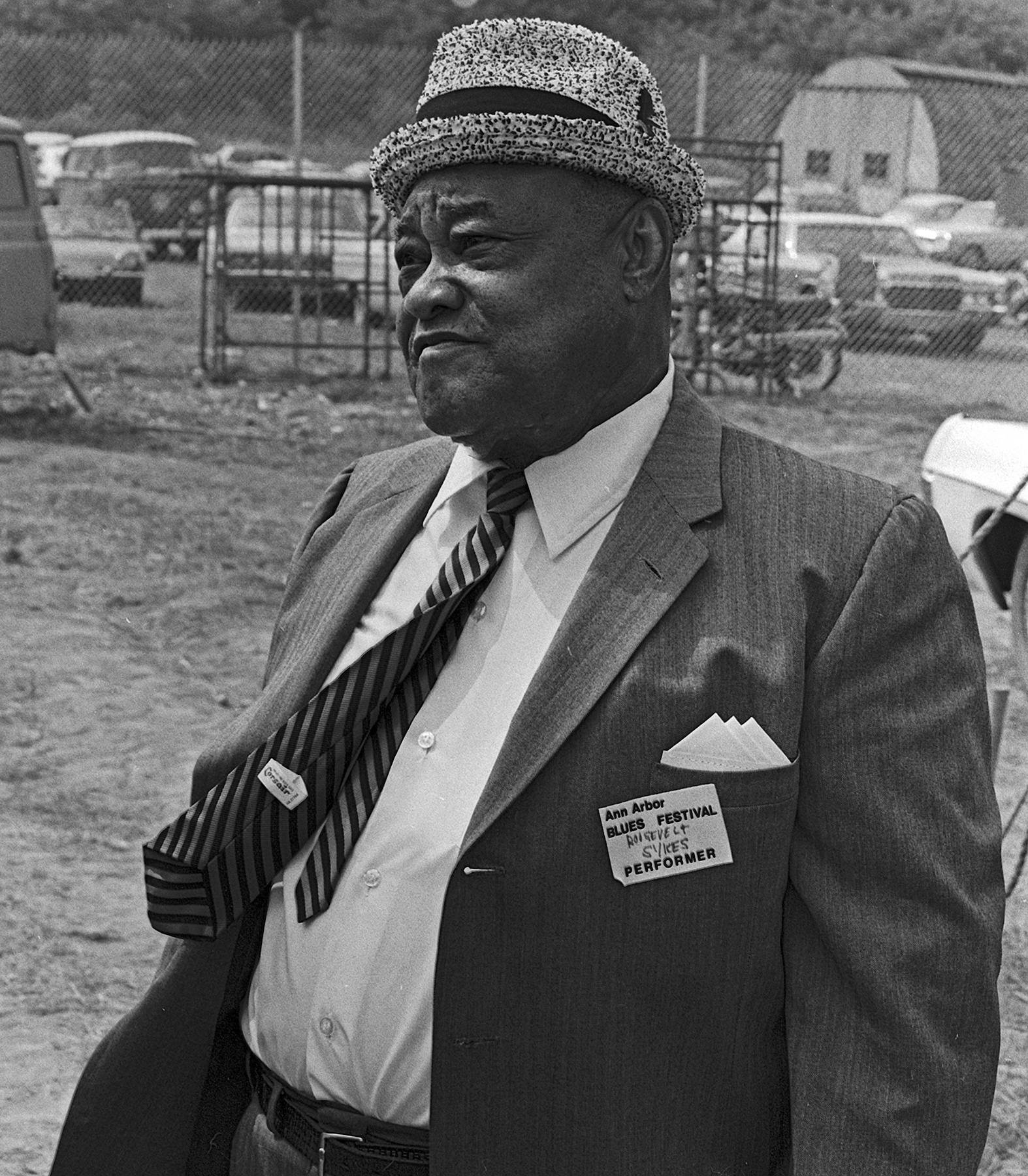
- Roosevelt Sykes at the 1970 Ann Arbor Blues Festival

Background information
- Also known as: The Honeydripper
- Born: January 31, 1906; Elmar, Arkansas, U.S.
- Died: July 17, 1983 (aged 77) New Orleans, Louisiana
- Genres: Blues, boogie-woogie
- Occupations: Singer, songwriter
- Instrument: Piano
- Years active: 1921–1983

Roosevelt Sykes (January 31, 1906 – July 17, 1983) was an American blues musician, also known as "the Honeydripper."

== Career ==
Sykes was born the son of a musician in Elmar, Arkansas. "Just a little old sawmill town," Sykes said of his birthplace. The Sykes family was living in St. Louis by 1909. Sykes often visited his grandfather's farm near West Helena. He began playing the church organ around the age of ten. "Every summer I would go down to Helena to visit my grandfather on his farm," he told biographer Valerie Wilmer. "He was a preacher and he had an organ I used to practice on, trying to learn how to play. I always liked the sound of the blues, liked to hear people singing, and since I was singing first, I was trying to play like I sang." Sykes was baptized at 13 years old, his lifelong beliefs never conflicting with playing the blues.

At age 15, he went on the road playing piano in a barrelhouse style of blues. Like many bluesmen of his time, he traveled around playing to all-male audiences in sawmill, turpentine and levee camps along the Mississippi River, sometimes in a duo with Big Joe Williams, gathering a repertoire of raw, sexually explicit material. In 1925 Sykes met Leothus "Lee" Green, a piano player in a West Helena theater playing a mix of blues, ragtime, waltz, and jazz to accompany silent movies. They worked the Louisiana and Mississippi work camp and roadhouse circuit together, with the older man acting as mentor and protector to Sykes. "I just been pickin' a little cotton," Sykes would say from the stage, "and pickin' a little piano." The more experienced Green taught him the style, characterized by separate bass and treble rhythms, that would become the basis for "44 Blues." Sykes' wanderings eventually brought him back to St. Louis, Missouri, where he met St. Louis Jimmy Oden, the writer of the blues standard "Goin' Down Slow."

After a few years Sykes found work at Katy Red's, a barrelhouse across the river in East St. Louis, Illinois. He was paid room and board, and a dollar a night. In 1929, he was spotted by a talent scout and sent to New York City to record for Okeh Records. The talent scout was Jesse Johnson, who owned De Luxe Music Shop. After Sykes had played a few songs on the store's piano Johnson offered him the opportunity to make his first recordings. His first release was "44 Blues" which became a blues standard and his signature song. Sykes recalled: "I started making records 14th of June 1929. I had been playing eight years or so before I started recording. The first number I made was a hit, '44 Blues', and every record I made was a star ever since." Sykes picked up his nickname "the Honey Dripper" while playing on a session for singer Edith Johnson later in 1929, during which she recorded "Honeydripper Blues." Johnson later said she gave him the name due to his kind disposition and easygoing personality. Sykes claimed the sobriquet dated back to his childhood, "Girls used to hang around me when I was a young kid. So the boys say, 'He must have honey.'" Sykes invested his earnings from recording in an illegal speakeasy that sold fried fish and alcohol, a business he continued at various locations for years. He recorded for different labels using pseudonyms, including "Easy Papa Johnson" for Melotone Records, "Dobby Bragg" for Paramount Records, "Willie Kelly" for Victor Records, and "the Bluesman" for Specialty Records, in the 1930s and 1940s. During this period he befriended another blues musician, the singer Charlie "Specks" McFadden, and accompanied him on half of McFadden's recordings.

Sykes and Oden moved to Chicago, where Sykes found his first period of fame when he signed a contract with Decca Records in 1934. In 1936 he recorded "Driving Wheel Blues" for Decca. He was soon a sought-after session pianist for the Bullet and Bluebird labels. Sykes and Oden continued their musical friendship into the 1960s.

In 1943 Sykes began performing with his band The Honeydrippers. The band often had as many as twelve musicians, including many of Chicago's best horn players. Despite the growing urbanity of his style, he gradually became less competitive in the post–World War II music scene. After his contract with RCA Victor expired, he recorded for smaller labels, such as United, until his opportunities ran out in the mid-1950s.

Sykes left Chicago for New Orleans in 1954, as electric blues was taking over the Chicago blues clubs. He also recorded two sessions for Imperial Records in 1955, that were produced by Dave Bartholomew. He moved back to Chicago in 1960 as the folk music revival rekindled interest in the blues. He toured Europe and performed at blues festivals in the United States. In the late 1960s Sykes moved back to New Orleans, where he played at clubs, including the Court of Two Sisters. When he recorded in the 1960s, it was for labels such as Delmark, Bluesville, Storyville and Folkways, which were documenting the quickly passing blues history. He lived his final years in New Orleans, where he died from a heart attack on July 17, 1983. He was buried at Providence Memorial Park in New Orleans in an unmarked grave. In 2015 the Killer Blues Headstone Project placed a headstone for him.

== Technique ==
Sykes said in his later years he decided to become a bluesman when he heard St. Louis piano player Red-Eye Jesse Bell. He named St. Louis musicians including Bell, Joe Crump, Baby Sneed, and his mentor "Pork Chop" Lee Green as his early influences. Leothus Lee "Pork Chop" Green, is thought to have schooled Sykes in mastering separate but complementary bass and treble rhythms.

Sykes had a big voice and a heavy foot. In his voice that could be piercing yet had a mellow side, he sang with beautiful vibrato and at times intricate embellishment. His piano style featured a simple left hand, frequently with single repeated notes on the beats, and with great rhythmic complexity in his right hand. Throughout his career his music was harmonically uncomplicated, seldom using more than the three standard blues chords. His technique was more akin to blues guitarists than to other piano players who were recorded at the time. Though he was highly skilled on breakneck boogie-woogie numbers, Sykes shone on slow and moderately paced blues. His left hand played a strong bedrock bass, keeping the beat, as his right hand roamed the length of the keyboard. He used the piano as a lead instrument rather than as part of the rhythm section. It was a style that worked without accompaniment, as well as with larger bands.

As his career progressed Sykes showed greater sophistication in the lyrics he wrote, including pop music influences, than in his playing or singing. Some of his later blues are in an 8-bar pattern, like pop or gospel, rather than in his earlier 12-bar manner. Sykes moved easily from country boogie-woogie to his urban blues piano style. A blues virtuoso, he played blues in an older way, adding flourishes, notes, and chord changes where he felt necessary, even if it meant adding or subtracting a beat. Nevertheless, Sykes was sensitive as an accompanist, responding to other musicians’ changes.

Sykes’ vocal trademark was his practice of singing half a measure ahead of his accompanying piano. Author Paul Oliver stated, "His habit of anticipating a phrase on the piano gave a rhythmic impetus to his sung lines."

== Legacy ==
Sykes had a long career, spanning the pre-war and postwar eras. His pounding piano boogies and risqué lyrics characterize his contributions to the blues. He was responsible for influential blues songs such as "44 Blues," "Driving Wheel," and "Night Time Is the Right Time."

He was inducted into the Blues Hall of Fame in 1999.

== Discography ==
- The Return of Roosevelt Sykes (Bluesville, 1960)
- The Honeydripper (Bluesville, 1961)
- Blues (Folkways, 1961) with Memphis Slim
- Face to Face with the Blues (Columbia, 1961)
- The Honeydripper: Roosevelt Sykes Plays and Sings the Blues (Columbia, 1962)
- Roosevelt Sykes Sings the Blues (Crown, 1963)
- Hard Drivin' Blues (Delmark, 1964) with Homesick James
- Roosevelt Sykes in Europe (Delmark, 1966 [1969])
- The Meek Roosevelt Sykes (Carson, 1969; Jewel, 1973)
- Chicago Blues Festival (Black & Blue, 1970) with Homesick James
- Feel Like Blowing My Horn (Delmark, 1970 [1973])
- The Honeydripper's Duke's Mixture (Barclay, 1971)
- Roosevelt Sykes is Blue and Ribald...A 'Dirty Mother' for You (Southland, 1972)
- Dirty Double Mother (BluesWay, 1973)
- Music Is My Business (Blue Labor, 1975 [1977])
- The Original Honeydripper (Blind Pig, 1977)
- Boot That Thing 1929–1941 (Acrobat ADDCD-3019 [2CD], 2008) includes material recorded for the OKeh, Victor, Paramount, Champion, and Decca labels.
