= Best Of (Creedence Clearwater Revival album) =

Greatest hits album by Creedence Clearwater Revival
- Released: June 2, 2008
- Genre: Rock
- Length: 1:13:59
- Label: Universal

Creedence Clearwater Revival chronology
Bad Moon Rising: The Best of Creedence Clearwater Revival (2003)	Best Of (2008)	Creedence Clearwater Revival Covers the Classics (2009)

Best Of is a 2008 compilation album by the American rock band Creedence Clearwater Revival.

== Reception ==
Professional ratings
Review scores
Source	Rating
AllMusic	4.5/5 stars

In a review of the album on AllMusic, James Christopher Monger states that "This 2008 best-of from Universal collects 24 tracks from the seminal '60s folk/blues/country-rock legends on a single disc" and that it "as good a single-disc retrospective as one could hope for, balancing all of the radio hits that made 1976's Chronicle, Vol. 1 and 1986's Chronicle, Vol. 2 the gold standard for most listeners" and stating at the end that "The only downside (depending on one's preferences) is the appearance of the single 45-rpm edits of 'I Heard It Through the Grapevine' and 'Suzie Q,' but the brevity works in context with the rest of the set". In a review of the album for MusicOMH, music critic Neil Dowden stated that it "is similar to previous compilations but its 24 tracks do indeed represent the cream of the band’s output." and that "This album proves him to be an outstanding songwriter, a singer of passionate power and a distinctive guitarist who could let rip if he wanted to."

== Track listing ==
Disc one

1. Bad Moon Rising – 2:21
2. Born on the Bayou – 5:16
3. Proud Mary – 3:08
4. Travelin' Band – 2:09
5. Have You Ever Seen the Rain? – 2:41
6. Green River – 2:33
7. Down on the Corner – 2:44
8. Lodi – 3:11
9. Fortunate Son – 2:19
10. Lookin' Out My Back Door – 2:34
11. Run Through the Jungle – 3:06
12. I Put a Spell on You – 4:32
13. Susie Q – 4:36
14. Sweet Hitch-Hiker – 2:56
15. It Came Out of the Sky – 2:55
16. Who'll Stop the Rain – 2:29
17. I Heard It Through the Grapevine – 3:54
18. Hey Tonight – 2:44
19. Cotton Fields – 2:57
20. Long as I Can See the Light – 3:34
21. Molina – 2:10
22. Hello Mary Lou – 2:14
23. The Midnight Special – 4:14
24. Up Around the Bend – 2:42

Live bonus disc

1. Born on the Bayou – 5:15
2. Green River – 3:00
3. Tombstone Shadow – 4:06
4. Don't Look Now – 2:26
5. Travelin' Band – 2:18
6. Who'll Stop the Rain – 2:32
7. Bad Moon Rising – 2:17
8. Proud Mary – 3:31
9. Fortunate Son – 2:24
10. Commotion – 2:36
11. The Midnight Special – 3:48
12. Night Time Is the Right Time – 3:30
13. Down on the Corner – 2:44
14. Keep on Chooglin' – 9:12

== Charts ==
=== Weekly charts ===
Weekly chart performance for Best Of
Chart (2008–2024)	Peak position
Australian Albums (ARIA)	36
Belgian Albums (Ultratop Flanders)	91
Danish Albums (Hitlisten)	1
Dutch Albums (Album Top 100)	24
Finnish Albums (The Official Finnish Charts)	40
New Zealand Albums (RMNZ)	9
Norwegian Albums (VG-lista)	3
Scottish Albums (OCC)	33
Spanish Albums (Promusicae)	92
Swedish Albums (Sverigetopplistan)	2
Swiss Albums (Schweizer Hitparade)	50
UK Albums (OCC)	46
UK Albums Sales (OCC)	31
UK Album Downloads (OCC)	27
UK Physical Albums (OCC)	46

=== Year-end charts ===
Year-end chart performance for Best Of
Chart (2008)	Position
Danish Albums (Hitlisten)	9
Norwegian Albums (VG-lista)	61
Swedish Albums (Sverigetopplistan)	45

== Certifications ==
Certifications for Best Of
Region	Certification	Certified units/sales
Australia (ARIA)	Platinum	70,000^{‡}
New Zealand (RMNZ)	2× Platinum	30,000^{‡}
United Kingdom (BPI)	Platinum	300,000^{^}
^{^} Shipments figures based on certification alone.^{‡} Sales+streaming figures based on certification alone.
