= Creedence Clearwater Revival: Box Set =

Box set by Creedence Clearwater Revival
- Released: October 2, 2001
- Recorded: 1961–1972
- Genres: Southern rock; rock and roll; roots rock
- Length: 420:51
- Label: Fantasy

Creedence Clearwater Revival chronology
Chronicle, Vol. 2 (1986)	Creedence Clearwater Revival: Box Set (2001)	Bad Moon Rising: The Best of Creedence Clearwater Revival (2003)

Creedence Clearwater Revival: Box Set is a career-spanning box set by American rock band Creedence Clearwater Revival, released in 2001. It contains the entirety of their seven studio albums, two live albums, and material recorded by the band under their previous names "The Golliwogs" and "The Blue Velvets", which comprises the majority of their released output. In November 2013, the box set was reissued with different artwork.

Professional ratings
Review scores
Source	Rating
AllMusic	4.5/5 stars
Austin Chronicle	4/5 stars

== Track listing ==
=== Disc One ===
1. "Come on Baby" – 2:15
2. "Oh My Love" – 1:58
3. "Have You Ever Been Lonely" – 2:20
4. "Bonita" – 1:43
  - Tracks 1 to 4 are recordings of Tommy Fogerty & The Blue Velvets
5. "Don't Tell Me No Lies" – 1:55
6. "Little Girl (Does Your Mama Know)" – 2:37
7. "Where You Been" – 2:42
8. "You Came Walking" – 2:00
9. "You Can't Be True" (First version) – 2:47
10. "You Got Nothin' on Me" – 2:38
11. "I Only Met You Just an Hour Ago" – 2:09
12. "Brown-Eyed Girl" – 2:35
13. "You Better Be Careful" – 2:38
14. "Fight Fire" – 2:34
15. "Fragile Child" – 2:39
16. "She Was Mine" – 2:20
17. "Gonna Hang Around" – 2:29
18. "Try Try Try" – 2:13
19. "Instrumental #1" – 3:01
20. "Little Tina" – 2:30
21. "Walking on the Water" – 3:10
22. "You Better Get It Before It Gets You" – 3:41
23. "Tell Me" – 4:05
24. "You Can't Be True" (Second version) – 2:49
  - Tracks 5 to 24 are recordings of The Golliwogs
25. "Action USA Promotional Spot" – 1:03

=== Disc Two ===
1. "Call It Pretending" – 2:10
  - Track 1 was originally released, with Porterville, as the B-side of the final Golliwogs single, later rereleased under the CCR name
2. "I Put a Spell on You" – 4:32
3. "The Working Man" – 3:05
4. "Susie Q" – 8:39
5. "Ninety-Nine and a Half (Won't Do)" – 3:40
6. "Get Down Woman" – 3:09
7. "Porterville" – 2:23
8. "Gloomy" – 3:50
9. "Walk on the Water" – 4:40
  - Tracks 2 to 9 are from Creedence Clearwater Revival (1968)
10. "Born on the Bayou" – 5:15
11. "Bootleg" – 3:02
12. "Graveyard Train" – 8:38
13. "Good Golly Miss Molly" – 2:43
14. "Penthouse Pauper" – 3:40
15. "Proud Mary" – 3:09
16. "Keep on Chooglin'" – 7:39
  - Tracks 10 to 16 are from Bayou Country (1969)

=== Disc Three ===
1. "Green River" – 2:36
2. "Commotion" – 2:45
3. "Tombstone Shadow" – 3:40
4. "Wrote a Song for Everyone" – 4:59
5. "Bad Moon Rising" – 2:23
6. "Lodi" – 3:12
7. "Cross-Tie Walker" – 3:20
8. "Sinister Purpose" – 3:22
9. "The Night Time Is the Right Time" – 3:10
  - Tracks 1 to 9 are from Green River (1969)
10. "Down on the Corner" – 2:47
11. "It Came Out of the Sky" – 2:56
12. "Cotton Fields" – 2:54
13. "Poorboy Shuffle" – 2:27
14. "Feelin' Blue" – 5:06
15. "Fortunate Son" – 2:21
16. "Don't Look Now (It Ain't You or Me)" – 2:12
17. "The Midnight Special" – 4:14
18. "Side of the Road" – 3:26
19. "Effigy" – 6:28
  - Tracks 10 to 19 are from Willy and the Poor Boys (1969)

=== Disc Four ===
1. "Ramble Tamble" – 7:12
2. "Before You Accuse Me" – 3:27
3. "Travelin' Band" – 2:09
4. "Ooby Dooby" – 2:07
5. "Lookin' Out My Back Door" – 2:34
6. "Run Through the Jungle" – 3:07
7. "Up Around the Bend" – 2:42
8. "My Baby Left Me" – 2:19
9. "Who'll Stop the Rain" – 2:30
10. "I Heard It Through the Grapevine" – 11:08
11. "Long as I Can See the Light" – 3:35
  - Tracks 1 to 11 are from Cosmo's Factory (1970)
12. "Pagan Baby" – 6:27
13. "Sailor's Lament" – 3:50
14. "Chameleon" – 3:17
15. "Have You Ever Seen the Rain?" – 2:40
16. "(Wish I Could) Hideaway" – 3:47
17. "Born to Move" – 5:41
18. "Hey Tonight" – 2:44
19. "It's Just a Thought" – 3:51
  - Tracks 12 to 19 are from Pendulum (1970)

=== Disc Five ===
1. "Molina" – 2:43
2. "Rude Awakening #2" – 6:23
  - Tracks 1 and 2 are from Pendulum
3. "45 Revolutions Per Minute (Part 1)" – 3:20
4. "45 Revolutions Per Minute (Part 2)" – 7:22
  - Tracks 3 and 4 are musique concrète tracks (in the vein of "Revolution 9"), including tongue-in-cheek interviews with band members
5. "Lookin' for a Reason" – 3:28
6. "Take It Like a Friend" – 3:02
7. "Need Someone to Hold" – 3:02
8. "Tearin' Up the Country" – 2:16
9. "Someday Never Comes" – 4:04
10. "What Are You Gonna Do" – 2:56
11. "Sail Away" – 2:33
12. "Hello Mary Lou" – 2:18
13. "Door to Door" – 2:11
14. "Sweet Hitch-Hiker" – 3:00
  - Tracks 5 to 14 are from Mardi Gras (1972)
15. "Born on the Bayou (Live)" – 5:14
16. "Green River (Live)" – 3:17
17. "Tombstone Shadow (Live)" – 3:41
18. "Don't Look Now (It Ain't You or Me) (Live)" – 2:21
19. "Travelin' Band (Live)" – 2:03
20. "Who'll Stop the Rain (Live)" – 2:21
21. "Bad Moon Rising (Live)" – 2:17
22. "Proud Mary (Live)" – 3:17
23. "Fortunate Son (Live)" – 2:22
24. "Commotion (Live)" – 2:36
  - Tracks 15 to 24 are from The Concert (1980)

=== Disc Six ===
1. "The Midnight Special (Live)" – 3:49
2. "The Night Time Is the Right Time (Live)" – 3:22
3. "Down on the Corner (Live)" – 2:43
4. "Keep on Chooglin' (Live)" – 9:14
  - Tracks 1 to 4 are from The Concert
5. "Born on the Bayou (Live)" – 5:04
6. "Green River/Susie Q (Live)" – 4:31
7. "It Came Out of the Sky (Live)" – 3:12
8. "Door to Door (Live)" – 2:00
9. "Travelin' Band (Live)" – 2:12
10. "Fortunate Son (Live)" – 2:25
11. "Commotion (Live)" – 2:34
12. "Lodi (Live)" – 3:11
13. "Bad Moon Rising (Live)" – 2:04
14. "Proud Mary (Live)" – 2:57
15. "Up Around the Bend (Live)" – 2:36
16. "Hey Tonight (Live)" – 2:31
17. "Sweet Hitch-Hiker (Live)" – 3:12
18. "Keep on Chooglin' (Live)" – 12:37
  - Tracks 5 to 18 are from Live in Europe (1973)

== Personnel ==
- Doug Clifford – percussion, drums, background vocals
- Stu Cook – bass, piano, keyboards, background vocals
- John Fogerty – vocals, lead guitar, keyboards, harmonica, saxophone, bass, horn, tambourine
- Tom Fogerty – rhythm guitar, vocals, background vocals (except Disc 5 tracks 5–14 and Disc 6 tracks 5–18)

=== Additional Personnel ===
- Ben Fong-Torres – liner notes
- Russ Gary – engineer
- Terri Hinte – production coordination
- Linda Kalin – design
- Stuart Kremsky – archive research, tape research, archives coordinator
- Tara Lochen – production coordination
- Dave Marsh – liner notes
- Hank McGill – engineer
- Shigeo Miyamoto – mastering
- Alec Palao – producer, liner notes, assembly, archive research, archives coordinator
- Walt Payne – engineer
- Jamie Putnam – art direction, design, package design
- Paul Rose – producer
- Joel Selvin – liner notes, photography
- Wally Sound – assembly
- Joe Tarantino – digital editing, audio restoration
- Ed Ward – liner notes
- Craig Werner – liner notes
- Baron Wolman – photography/cover photo
- Bruce Young – announcer
- Saul Zaentz – producer
- Didi Zill – photography
- Ed Caraeff – photography
- Roger Armstrong – archive research
- Tamaki Beck – mastering supervisor
- Stanley Booth – liner notes
- Robert Christgau – liner notes
