= Bad Moon Rising: The Best of Creedence Clearwater Revival =

Greatest hits album by Creedence Clearwater Revival
- Released: 2003
- Length: 72:51
- Label: Fantasy

Creedence Clearwater Revival chronology
Creedence Clearwater Revival: Box Set (2001)	Bad Moon Rising: The Best of Creedence Clearwater Revival (2003)	Best Of (2008)

Bad Moon Rising: The Best of Creedence Clearwater Revival is a compilation album of the major hits from American rock band Creedence Clearwater Revival. It was released in 2003.

== Track listing ==
1. *"Bad Moon Rising" - 2:18
2. "Up Around the Bend" - 2:42
3. *"Proud Mary" - 3:07
4. "Travelin' Band" - 2:07
5. "Green River" - 2:32
6. "Down on the Corner" - 2:45
7. "Have You Ever Seen the Rain?" - 2:38
8. "Long as I Can See the Light" - 3:31
9. "Sweet Hitch-Hiker" - 2:56
10. "Susie Q" - 4:35
11. "Lodi" - 3:09
12. "Commotion" - 2:41
13. "I Put a Spell on You" - 4:30
14. *"Born on the Bayou" - 5:15
15. *"Fortunate Son" - 2:18
16. "Hey Tonight" - 2:42
17. "Who'll Stop the Rain" - 2:28
18. "Wrote a Song for Everyone" - 4:55
19. "Run Through the Jungle" - 3:06
20. "Lookin' out My Back Door" - 2:31
21. "Someday Never Comes" - 4:00
22. *"I Heard It Through the Grapevine" - 3:52
23. "The Midnight Special" - 4:10

=== Best of Creedence Clearwater Revival ===
"The CCR Mix" is a song only featured on an Asian version of the album and is a song that was performed live and is a medley of several different songs, including "Proud Mary", "Who'll Stop the Rain", and "Lodi".

1. "Have You Ever Seen the Rain?" - 2:38
2. "Who'll Stop the Rain" - 2:28
3. "Cotton Fields" - 2:55
4. "Proud Mary" - 3:07
5. "Lodi" - 3:09
6. "Bad Moon Rising" - 2:18
7. "Down on the Corner" - 2:44
8. "Hello Mary Lou" - 2:15
9. "Hey Tonight" - 2:42
10. "Someday Never Comes" - 4:00
11. "Long as I Can See the Light" - 3:31
12. "Lookin' Out My Back Door" - 2:32
13. "Susie Q, Pt. 2" - 3:48
14. "Green River" - 2:32
15. "Sweet Hitch-Hiker" - 2:56
16. "Up Around the Bend" - 2:42
17. "Molina" - 2:41
18. "Travelin' Band" - 2:07
19. "The CCR Mix (Proud Mary/Born on the Bayou/Who'll Stop the Rain/Lodi/...)" - 7:08
