= Whitey Ford (disambiguation) =

Whitey Ford was an American baseball player.

Whitey Ford may also refer to:

- Everlast or Whitey Ford (born 1969) an American rapper, singer, and songwriter
- The Duke of Paducah or Benjamin "Whitey" Ford, country comedian
