= Big Joe Turner =

American blues singer (1911–1985)

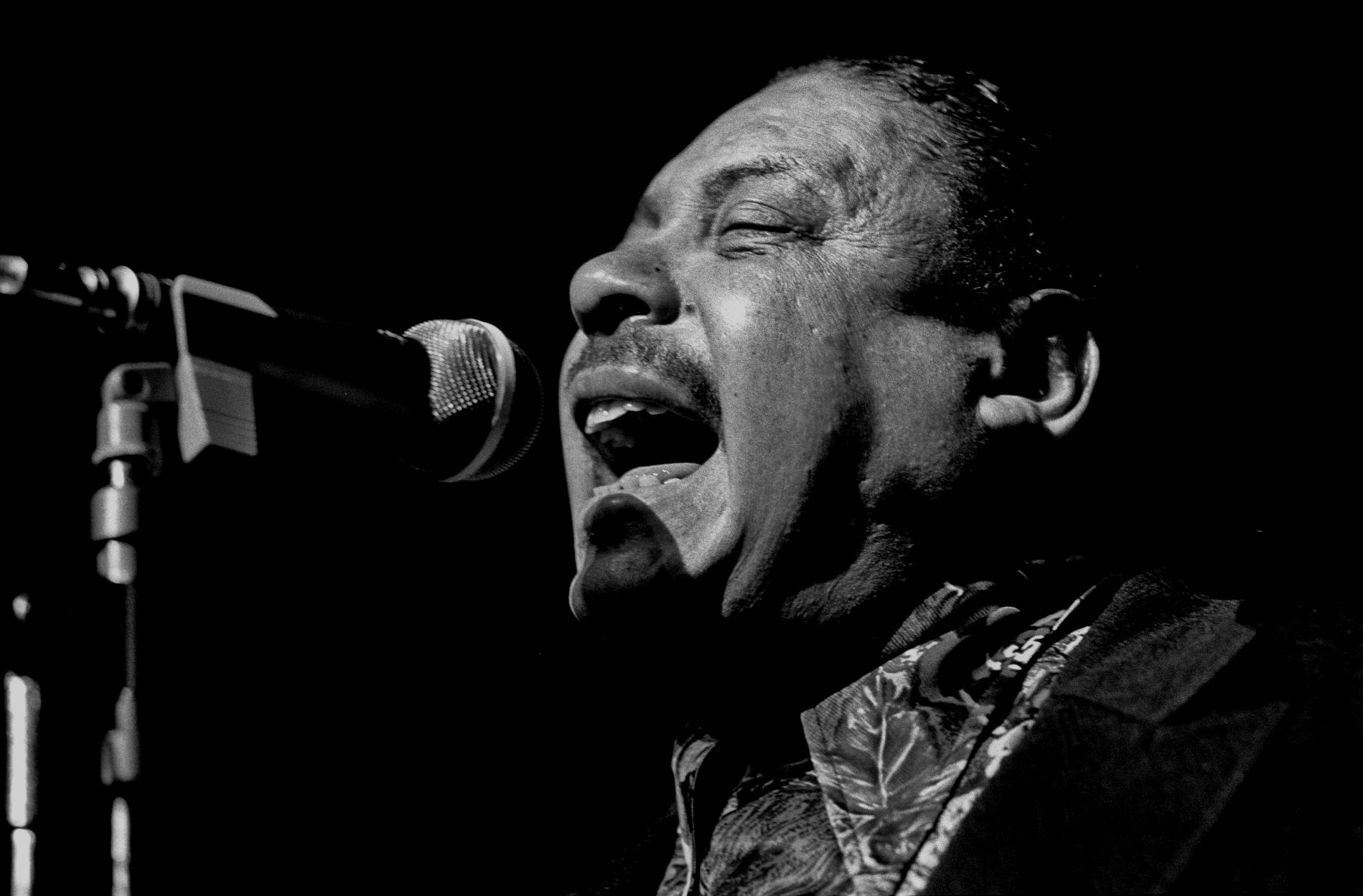
- Turner performing, 1973

Background information
- Also known as: Joe Turner; Lou Willie Turner
- Born: Joseph Vernon Turner Jr. May 18, 1911; Kansas City, Missouri, U.S.
- Died: November 24, 1985 (aged 74) Inglewood, California, U.S.
- Genres: Jump blues; swing; R&B; rock and roll
- Occupation: Singer
- Years active: 1920s–1980s
- Labels: Atlantic; London; National; Vocalion; Decca; Pablo; Rhino

Joseph Vernon "Big Joe" Turner Jr. (May 18, 1911 – November 24, 1985) was an American blues shouter from Kansas City, Missouri. Turner's greatest fame was due to his rock and roll recordings in the 1950s, particularly "Shake, Rattle and Roll", but his career as a performer endured from the 1920s into the 1980s.

Turner was inducted into the Rock and Roll Hall of Fame in 1987, with the Hall lauding him as "the brawny voiced 'Boss of the Blues.'" According to songwriter Doc Pomus, "rock and roll would have never happened without him." AllMusic called Turner "the premier blues shouter of the postwar era".

== Life and career ==
=== Early days ===
Turner was born May 18, 1911, in Kansas City, Missouri, United States. His father was killed in a train accident when Turner was four years old. He sang in his church, and on street corners for money. He left school at age fourteen to work in Kansas City's nightclubs, first as a cook and later as a singing bartender. He became known as "The Singing Barman", and worked in such venues as the Kingfish Club and the Sunset, and would frequently perform at these venues alongside his friend Pete Johnson on piano. The Sunset was managed by Piney Brown. It featured "separate but equal" facilities for white patrons. Turner wrote "Piney Brown Blues" in his honor and sang it throughout his career.

At that time Kansas City nightclubs were subject to frequent raids by the police; Turner said, "The Boss man would have his bondsmen down at the police station before we got there. We'd walk in, sign our names and walk right out. Then we would cabaret until morning."

His partnership with Johnson proved fruitful. Together they went to New York City in 1936, where they appeared on a playbill with Benny Goodman, but as Turner recounted, "After our show with Goodman, we auditioned at several places, but New York wasn't ready for us yet, so we headed back to K.C." Eventually they were seen by the talent scout John Hammond in 1938, who invited them back to New York to appear in one of his From Spirituals to Swing concerts at Carnegie Hall, which were instrumental in introducing jazz and blues to a wider American audience.

In part because of their appearance at Carnegie Hall, Turner and Johnson had a major success with the song "Roll 'Em Pete". The track was basically a collection of traditional blues lyrics. It was a song that Turner recorded many times, with various musicians, over the ensuing years.

=== 1939 to 1950 ===
In 1939, along with the boogie-woogie pianists Albert Ammons and Meade Lux Lewis, Turner and Johnson began a residency at Café Society, a nightclub in New York City, where they appeared on the same playbill as Billie Holiday and Frankie Newton's band. Besides "Roll 'Em, Pete", Turner's best-known recordings from this period are probably "Cherry Red", "I Want a Little Girl" and "Wee Baby Blues". "Cherry Red" was recorded in 1939 for the Vocalion label, with Hot Lips Page on trumpet and a full band in attendance. During the next year Turner contracted with Decca and recorded "Piney Brown Blues" with Johnson on piano.

In 1941, he went to Los Angeles and performed in Duke Ellington's revue Jump for Joy in Hollywood. He appeared as a singing policeman in a comedy sketch, "He's on the Beat". Los Angeles was his home for a time, and during 1944 he worked in Meade Lux Lewis's Soundies musical movies. He sang on the soundtrack recordings but was not present for filming, and his vocals were mouthed by the comedian Dudley Dickerson for the camera. In 1945 Turner and Pete Johnson established the Blue Moon Club, a bar in Los Angeles.

In 1945, he also signed a recording contract with National Records, for which he recorded under the supervision of Herb Abramson. His first hit single was a cover of Saunders King's "S.K. Blues" (1945). He recorded the songs "My Gal's a Jockey" and the risqué "Around the Clock" the same year, and Aladdin Records released "Battle of the Blues", a duet with Wynonie Harris. Turner stayed with National until 1947, but none of his recordings were big sellers. In 1950, he recorded the song "Still in the Dark", released by Freedom Records. Joe Turner also played at the Cavalcades of Jazz concert held at Wrigley Field in Los Angeles which was produced by Leon Hefflin Sr. on September 23, 1945, to a crowd of 15,000. Count Basie, the Honeydrippers, The Peters Sisters, Slim and Bam and Valaida Snow were also featured artists. Turner also performed alongside Dizzy Gillespie at the fourth annual Cavalcade of Jazz concert held at Wrigley Field in Los Angeles, on September 12, 1948. Also on the program that day were Frankie Laine, The Sweethearts of Rhythm, The Honeydrippers, Little Miss Cornshucks, Jimmy Witherspoon, The Blenders, and The Sensations.

Turner was a significant figure in the development of rhythm and blues. According to the Rock & Roll Hall of Fame, Turner and Louis Jordan laid the foundation for R&B in the 1940s, "cutting one swinging rhythm & blues masterpiece after another".

Turner made many albums with Johnson, Art Tatum, Willie "The Lion" Smith, Sammy Price, and other jazz groups. He recorded for several record companies. He also performed with the Count Basie Orchestra. During his career, Turner was part of the transition from big bands to jump blues to rhythm and blues to rock and roll. He was a master of traditional blues verses, and at Kansas City jam sessions he could swap choruses with instrumental soloists for hours.

=== Success during the 1950s ===
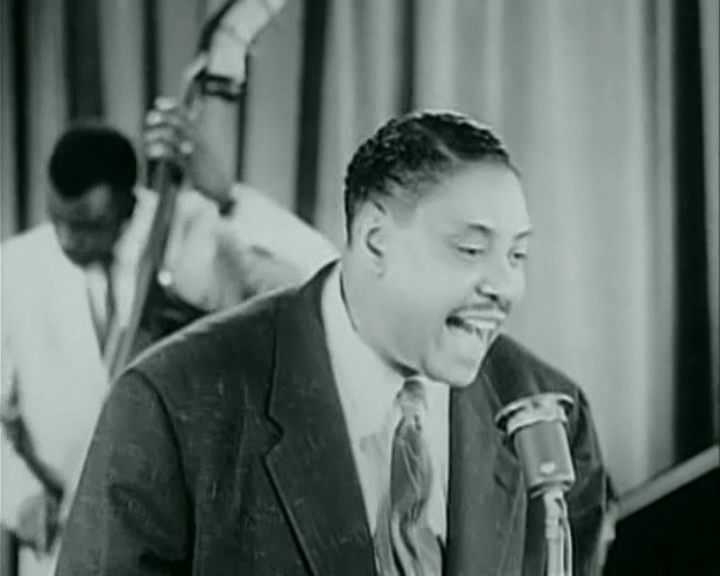
Turner performing in the 1955 film Rock 'n' Roll Revue

In 1951, while performing with the Count Basie Orchestra at Harlem's Apollo Theater as a replacement for Jimmy Rushing, he was spotted by Ahmet and Nesuhi Ertegun, who contracted him to their new recording company, Atlantic Records. Turner recorded a number of successes for them, including the blues standards "Chains of Love" and "Sweet Sixteen". Many of his vocals are punctuated with shouts to the band members, as in "Boogie Woogie Country Girl" ("That's a good rockin' band!", "Go ahead, man! Ow! That's just what I need!" ) and "Honey Hush" (he repeatedly sings, "Hi-yo, Silver!", a famous command used by the Lone Ranger on his popular radio show, to his horse named Silver). Turner's records reached the top of the rhythm-and-blues charts. Some of his songs were so risqué that some radio stations refused to play them, but they received much play on jukeboxes.

Turner had great success during 1954 with "Shake, Rattle and Roll", which significantly boosted his career, turning him into a teenage favorite, and also helped to transform popular music. During the song, Turner yells at his woman to "get outta that bed, wash yo' face an' hands" and comments that she's "wearin' those dresses, the sun comes shinin' through! I can't believe my eyes, all that mess belongs to you." He sang it on film for the 1955 theatrical feature Rhythm and Blues Revue.

Although the cover version of the song by Bill Haley & His Comets, with the risqué lyrics partly omitted, was a greater sales success, many listeners sought out Turner's version and were introduced thereby to rhythm and blues. Elvis Presley's version of "Shake, Rattle and Roll" combined Turner's lyrics with Haley's arrangement, but was not a successful single.

"The Chicken and the Hawk", "Flip, Flop and Fly", "Hide and Seek", "Morning, Noon and Night", and "Well All Right" were successful recordings from this period. He performed on the television program Showtime at the Apollo and in the movie Shake Rattle & Rock! (1956).

The song "Corrine, Corrina" was another great seller during 1956. In addition to the rock music songs, he released Boss of the Blues album in 1956. "(I'm Gonna) Jump for Joy", his last hit, reached the US R&B record chart on May 26, 1958.

He toured Australia in 1957 with Lee Gordon's Big Show sharing the bill with Bill Haley and the Comets, LaVern Baker and Freddie Bell and the Bellboys.

=== Awards ===
He won the Esquire magazine award for male vocalist in 1945.

He won the Melody Maker award for best "new" vocalist of 1956.

=== Returning to Jazz ===
After a number of successes in popular music, Turner resumed singing with small jazz combos, recording numerous albums in that style during the 1960s and 1970s. In 1966, Bill Haley helped revive Turner's career by lending him the Comets for a series of popular recordings for the Orfeón label in Mexico.

During the 1960s and 1970s he resumed performing jazz and blues music, performing at many music festivals and recording for Norman Granz's Pablo Records. He also worked with Axel Zwingenberger. Turner also participated in a "Battle of the Blues" with Wynonie Harris and T-Bone Walker.

In 1965, he toured in England with the trumpeter Buck Clayton and the trombonist Vic Dickenson, accompanied by Humphrey Lyttelton and his band. Part of a studio concert was televised by the BBC and later issued on DVD. A sound recording of a club appearance made during this tour is not thought of sufficient sound quality to justify commercial issue. He also toured Europe with Count Basie and his orchestra. He won the British Jazz Journal award as top male singer of 1965.

In 1977, Turner recorded a cover version of Guitar Slim's song "The Things That I Used to Do", and "I'm Gonna Sit Right Down and Write Myself a Letter", for Spivey Records, with Lloyd Glenn on piano.

Turner received top billing with Count Basie in the Kansas City jazz reunion movie The Last of the Blue Devils (1979), featuring Jay McShann, Jimmy Forrest, and other players from the city.

In 1983, two years before his death, Turner was inducted into the Blues Hall of Fame. That same year, the album Blues Train was released by Muse Records; the album featured Turner with the band Roomful of Blues.

Turner's career endured from the barrooms of Kansas City in the 1920s (when at the age of twelve he performed with a pencilled moustache and his father's hat) to European jazz festivals of the 1980s.

== Death and tributes ==
Turner died of heart failure in November 1985, at the age of 74, in Inglewood, California, having suffered from effects of arthritis, a stroke and diabetes. His funeral included musical tributes from Etta James and Barbara Morrison. He was buried at Roosevelt Memorial Park in Gardena, California.

He was posthumously inducted into the Rock and Roll Hall of Fame in 1987.

The New York Times music critic Robert Palmer wrote of "his voice, pushing like a Count Basie solo, rich and grainy as a section of saxophones, which dominated the room with the sheer sumptuousness of its sound." In announcing Turner's death, the British music magazine NME, in its December 1985 issue, described him as "the grandfather of rock and roll".

According to the Blues Hall of Fame, Turner "was a king of the jump blues genre, a boogie woogie belter, progenitor of rhythm & blues and rock 'n' roll, and a respected performer in jazz circles.

Dave Alvin wrote a song about an evening he spent with Turner, entitled "Boss of the Blues", for his 2009 album, Dave Alvin and the Guilty Women. Alvin discussed the song in issue 59 of the Blasters Newsletter. Alvin later collaborated with his brother and former Blaster Phil Alvin on a second reunion album, Lost Time, released in 2015, containing four covers of songs by Turner, including "Cherry Red", "Wee Baby Blues" and "Hide and Seek". The brothers met Turner in Los Angeles, where he was playing in clubs on Central Avenue and living in the Adams district between tours in the 1960s. Phil Alvin opened for Turner a few times with his first band, Delta Pacific. Turner continued mentoring the Alvin brothers until his death in 1985. He is pictured on the back cover of Lost Time.

The biographical film The Buddy Holly Story refers to Turner and his contemporaries Little Richard and Fats Domino as major influences on Holly, who is portrayed collecting their vinyl recordings.

A biography and discography, Big Joe Turner Feel So Fine, written by Derek Coller was published by Hardinge Simpole in 2023 (ISBN 978-1-84382-232-5).

== Most famous recordings ==
- "Roll 'Em Pete" (1938), available in many versions over the years; used in the million-dollar opening scene of Spike Lee's 1992 film Malcolm X
- "Chains of Love" * (1951), Turner's first million-seller, written by Ahmet Ertegun under the pseudonym "Nugetre" for the lyrics and Vann "Piano Man" Walls for the music, reaching the million sales mark by 1954
- "Honey Hush" * (1953), Turner's second million-seller, written by Turner but credited to Lou Willie Turner
- "Shake, Rattle and Roll" (1954), written by "Charles Calhoun", Jesse Stone's songwriting name
- "Flip, Flop and Fly" * (1955), sold a million copies over the years; written by Charles Calhoun and Turner but credited to Lou Willie Turner
- "Cherry Red" (1956)
- "Corrine, Corrina" * (1956), his fourth million-seller, with adaption by J. Mayo Williams, Mitchell Parish and Bo Chatmon in 1932; reached number 41 and spent 10 weeks on the Billboard record chart
- "Wee Baby Blues" (1956), a song Turner had been singing since his Kingfish Club days
- "Love Roller Coaster" (1956), with new lyrics to the Kansas City classic "Morning Glory"
- "Midnight Special" (1957)

Tracks marked with an asterisk were million-selling records.

== Discography ==
=== Albums ===
- Kansas City Jazz (Decca DL 8044, 1951)
- Joe Turner and Pete Johnson (EmArcy, 1955)
- The Boss of the Blues: Joe Turner Sings Kansas City Jazz (Atlantic, 1956)
- Joe Turner: Rock & Roll (Atlantic, 1957)
- Rockin' the Blues (Atlantic, 1958)
- And The Blues'll Make You Happy Too (Savoy, 1958)
- Careless Love (Savoy, 1958)
- Big Joe is Here (Atlantic, 1959)
- Big Joe Rides Again (Atlantic, 1960)
- Jumpin' the Blues (Arhoolie, 1962) with Pete Johnson
- Joe Turner and Jimmy Nelson (Crown, 1963)
- Sings The Blues, Vol. 1 (Oriole, 1964)
- Sings The Blues, Vol. 2 (Oriole, 1965)
- Feel So Fine (Fontana, 1965) with Buck Clayton; reissued as Buck Clayton Meets Joe Turner (Black Lion, 1992)
- Presenting Big Joe Turner (Orfeon [mex], 1966)
- Singing the Blues (ABC/BluesWay, 1967) reissued as Roll 'Em (ABC/BluesWay, 1973)
- The Real Boss of the Blues (BluesTime/Flying Dutchman, 1969)
- Super Black Blues (BluesTime/Flying Dutchman, 1969) with T-Bone Walker and Otis Spann
- Super Black Blues, Volume II (BluesTime/Flying Dutchman, 1970) with Leon Thomas, T-Bone Walker, Eddie "Cleanhead" Vinson
- Turns On the Blues (Kent, 1970)
- Texas Style (Black and Blue, 1971)
- 1972 – Flip, Flop & Fly (Pablo, 1989) with Count Basie & His Orchestra
- 1973 – Boss Man of the Blues (LMI Records, 1973)
- 1973 – The Bosses (Pablo, 1974) with Count Basie
- 1974 – Life Ain't Easy (Pablo, 1983)
- 1974 – The Trumpet Kings Meet Joe Turner (Pablo, 1975) with Dizzy Gillespie, Roy Eldridge, Harry "Sweets" Edison, Clark Terry
- 1975 – Everyday I Have the Blues (Pablo, 1978) with Pee Wee Crayton and Sonny Stitt
- 1975 – Nobody in Mind (Pablo, 1976) with Milt Jackson and Roy Eldridge
- 1976 – In the Evening (Pablo, 1976)
- 1976 – The Midnight Special (Pablo, 1980)
- 1977 – Things That I Used to Do (Pablo, 1977)
- 1977 – San Francisco 1977 (RockBeat, 2017) with Mike Bloomfield
- 1977 – I'm Gonna Sit Right Down and Write Myself a Letter (Spivey, 1978) with the Bill Dacey-Robert Ross Band
- 1978 – Really the Blues (Big Town, 1978)
- 1978 – Have No Fear Joe Turner is Here (Pablo, 1981)
- 1974–1978 – Stormy Monday (Pablo, 1991) previously unissued Pablo recordings
- 1980 – Kansas City Shout (Pablo, 1980) with Count Basie and Eddie "Cleanhead" Vinson
- 1981 – Boogie Woogie Jubilee (Telefunken, 1981) with Axel Zwingenberger
- 1981 – Rock This Joint (Intermedia, 1982)
- 1981 – The Very Best Of Big Joe Turner Live (Intermedia, 1982)
- 1981 – Boss Blues Live! (Intermedia, 1982)
- 1981 – Roll Me Baby (Intermedia, 1982)
- 1983 – Live at the Music Machine 1983 (RockBeat, 2013)
- 1983 – Blues Train (Muse, 1983) with Roomful of Blues
- 1983 – Big Joe Turner with Knocky Parker and His House Rockers (Southland, 1985)
- 1984 – Kansas City Here I Come (Pablo, 1984)
- 1985 – Patcha, Patcha, All Night Long (Pablo, 1985) with Jimmy Witherspoon
- 1938–1954 – Shout, Rattle And Roll (1938–1954) (Proper, 2005) 4-CD set
- 1941–1946 – The Chronological Joe Turner 1941–1946 (Classics, 1997)
- 1946–1947 – The Chronological Joe Turner 1946–1947 (Classics, 1998)
- 1947–1948 – The Chronological Joe Turner 1947–1948 (Classics, 1999)
- 1949–1950 – The Chronological Joe Turner 1949–1950 (Classics, 2001)

=== Singles ===
Year	Titles (A-side, B-side) Both sides from same album except where indicated	Chart Positions		Album
Year	Titles (A-side, B-side) Both sides from same album except where indicated	US Pop	US R&B	Album
1941	"Piney Brown Blues" b/w "627 Stomp" [by Pete Johnson's Band]	—	—	Non-album tracks
1941	"Doggin' the Dog" b/w "Rainy Day Blues"	—	—	Non-album tracks
1941	"Somebody's Got to Go" b/w "Ice Man"	—	—	Non-album tracks
1941	"Careless Love" [original recording] b/w "Jumpin' Down Blues" (non-album track)	—	—	Joe Turner and Pete Johnson
1942	"Sun Risin' Blues" b/w "Blues on Central Avenue"	—	—	Non-album tracks
1944	"Little Bittie Gal's Blues" b/w "I Got a Gal for Every Day in the Week"; Big Joe Turner and Pete Johnson Trio	—	—	Non-album tracks
1945	"Watch That Jive" b/w "Johnson & Turner Blues"; Joe Turner with Pete Johnson's All-Stars	—	—	Joe Turner and Pete Johnson
1945	"It's the Same Old Story" b/w "Rebecca"	—	—	Non-album tracks
1945	"S.K. Blues", Part 1 b/w Part 2 Joe Turner with Pete Johnson's All-Stars	—	3	Joe Turner and Pete Johnson
1946	"Mad Blues" b/w "Sunday Morning Blues"; Joe Turner with Bill Moore's Lucky Seven	—	—	Careless Love
1946	"My Gal's a Jockey" b/w "I Got Love for Sale" (from Careless Love)	—	6	Have No Fear Big Joe Turner Is Here
1948	"Tell Me Pretty Baby" b/w "Christmas Date Boogie"	—	—	Jumpin' the Blues
1948	"Mardi Gras Boogie" b/w "My Heart Belongs to You"	—	—	Non-album tracks
1948	"Morning Glory" b/w "Low Down Dog"	—	—	The Boss of the Blues Sings Kansas City Jazz
1949	"Blues on Central Avenue" b/w "Sun Risin' Blues"; Reissue	—	—	Non-album tracks
1949	"I Don't Dig It" b/w "Rainy Weather Blues"	—	—	Non-album tracks
1950	"Love My Baby" b/w "Lucille"	—	—	Non-album tracks
1950	"Still in the Dark" b/w "Adam Bit the Apple" (non-album track)	—	9	And the Blues'll Make You Happy Too
1950	"After A While, You'll Be Sorry" b/w "Feelin' Happy"	—	—	Non-album tracks
1950	"I Want My Baby" b/w "Midnight Is Here Again"	—	—	Non-album tracks
1950	"Jumpin' at the Jubilee" b/w "Lonely World" [by Goree Carter]	—	—	Non-album tracks
1950	"Just a Travellin' Man" b/w "Life Is Like a Card Game"	—	—	Non-album tracks
1950	"Back-Breaking Blues" b/w "Empty Pocket Blues"	—	—	Non-album tracks
1951	"Chains of Love" b/w "After My Laughter Came Tears" (from Big Joe Is Here)	—	2	Rock & Roll
1951	"Christmas Date" b/w "Howd'ya Want Your Rollin' Done" (non-album track)	—	—	Jumpin' the Blues
1951	"Life Is Like a Card Game" b/w "When the Rooster Crows"	—	—	Non-album tracks
1951	"The Chill Is On" b/w 'Bump Miss Susie"	—	3	Big Joe Is Here
1952	"Sweet Sixteen" b/w "I'll Never Stop Loving You" (from Big Joe Is Here)	—	3	Rock & Roll
1952	"Don't You Cry" b/w "Poor Lover's Blues"	—	5	Big Joe Is Here
1952	"Still In Love (With You)" b/w "Baby, I Still Want You" (from Big Joe Is Here)	—	—	Rockin' the Blues
1953	"Blues Jump the Rabbit" b/w "The Sun Is Shining"	—	—	Non-album tracks
1953	"Honey Hush" (later retitled "Yakity-Yak") b/w "Crawdad Hole"	—	1	Rock & Roll
1954	"T.V. Mama" b/w "Oke-She-Moke-She-Pop" (from Rock & Roll)	—	6	Rockin' the Blues
1954	"Shake, Rattle and Roll" b/w "You Know I Love You" (from Rockin' the Blues)	—	1	Rock & Roll
1954	"Well All Right" b/w "Married Woman" (from Big Joe Is Here)	—	9	Rock & Roll
1955	"Flip Flop and Fly" b/w "Ti-Ri-Lee" (from Big Joe Is Here)	—	2	Rock & Roll
1955	"Hide and Seek" b/w "Midnight Cannonball" (from Big Joe Is Here)	—	3	Rock & Roll
1956	"The Chicken and the Hawk" "Morning, Noon and Night"	—	7	Rock & Roll
1956	"Morning, Noon and Night" "The Chicken and the Hawk"	—	8	Rockin' the Blues
1956	"Corrine, Corrina" [original version] b/w "It's the Same Old Story"	—	—	Non-album tracks
1956	"Corrine, Corrina" [re-recorded version] b/w "Boogie Woogie Country Girl"	41	2	Rock & Roll
1956	"Lipstick, Powder and Paint"; Rock a While"	—	8	Rockin' the Blues
1956	"Rock a While" "Lipstick, Powder and Paint"	—	12	Big Joe Is Here
1956	"Midnight Special Train" b/w "Feeling Happy"	—	—	Rock & Roll
1957	"After a While" b/w "Red Sails in the Sunset"	—	—	Rockin' the Blues
1957	"Love Roller Coaster" b/w "World of Trouble"	—	12	Rockin' the Blues
1957	"Trouble in Mind" b/w "I Need a Girl"	—	—	Rockin' the Blues
1957	"Teen Age Letter" b/w "Wee Baby Blues" (from The Boss of the Blues Sings Kansas City Jazz)	—	—	Rockin' the Blues
1958	"Jump for Joy" b/w "Blues in the Night"	—	15	Rockin' the Blues
1959	"Got You on My Mind" b/w "Love Oh Careless Love"	—	—	Rhythm & Blues Years
1960	"Honey Hush" [re-recording] b/w "Tomorrow Night"	53	—	Rhythm & Blues Years
1960	"Chains of Love" [re-recording] b/w "My Little Honey Dripper"	—	—	Rhythm & Blues Years
1960	"My Reason for Living" b/w "Sweet Sue"	—	—	Rhythm & Blues Years
1964	"I'm Packin' Up" b/w "I Walk a Lonely Mile"	—	—	Non-album tracks
1964	"Shake Rattle and Roll" [re-recording] b/w "There'll Be Some Tears Falling"	—	—	Non-album tracks
1967	"Big Wheel" b/w "Bluer Than Blue"	—	—	Singing the Blues
1968	"I've Been Up on the Mountain" b/w "I Love You Baby" (non-album track)	—	—	Boss Man of the Blues
1969	"Shake Rattle and Roll" [second re-recording] b/w "Two Loves Have I"	—	—	The Real Boss of the Blues
1969	"Love Ain't Nothin'" b/w "10-20-25-30"	—	—	Non-album tracks
1969	"Night Time Is the Right Time" b/w "Morning Glory"	—	—	Big Joe Turner Turns On the Blues
1973	"One Hour in Your Garden" b/w "You've Been Squeezin' My Lemons"	—	—	Still Boss of the Blues

== Bibliography ==
- The Encyclopedia of Jazz and Blues. ISBN 1-86155-385-4.
- Jumpin' the Blues, Joe Turner with Pete Johnson's Orchestra. Liner notes. Arhoolie Records.
- Rocks in My Bed, Big Joe Turner. Liner notes. International Music.
- The Chronological Joe Turner, 1949–1950. Liner notes. Classics Records.
- Rock and Roll, Big Joe Turner. Liner notes. Atlantic Records.
- Shout, Rattle and Roll, Big Joe Turner. Liner notes. Proper Records (four-CD boxed set), 2005.
- I'm Gonna Sit Right Down and Write Myself a Letter, Big Joe Turner. Liner notes. Spivey Records, 1977.
