= Don't Look Now (It Ain't You or Me) =

Song by Creedence Clearwater Revival

from the album Willy and the Poor Boys
- Released: November 1969
- Recorded: 1969
- Genre: Rockabilly
- Length: 2:11
- Label: Fantasy Records
- Songwriter: John Fogerty
- Producer: John Fogerty

"Don't Look Now (It Ain't You or Me)" is a song written by John Fogerty that was first released on Creedence Clearwater Revival's 1969 album Willy and the Poor Boys. It has also appeared on several of the group's live and compilation albums. It was covered by Minutemen on their 1984 album Double Nickels on the Dime.

== Lyrics and music ==
"Don't Look Now (It Ain't You or Me)" follows "Fortunate Son" on Willy and the Poor Boys and it follows up the latter's political theme of class disparities. "Don't Look Now (It Ain't You or Me)" supports common laborers at the expense of rock stars and hippies. It critiques the fact that hippies get to enjoy their idealism and their music, but while they are having fun and ignoring responsibilities the less fortunate have to do the hard work such as farming, mining and making clothing. It is structured as a series of questions, such as "Who will work the field with his hands?" "Who takes the coal from the mines?" "Who takes the salt from the earth?" and "Who will keep the promises that you don't have to keep?" It answers the questions by stating, "Don't look now, it ain't you or me". In a manner reminiscent of Bob Dylan's "Blowin' in the Wind", the first two questions in each verse are practical ones, such as the ones about working the field or mining for coal or salt, while the third and last question of each verse is more metaphysical, such as the one about keeping promises.

Fogerty stated that while like many in his generation he was concerned about what was happening in America at the time, he was also concerned about issues with his hippie generation itself. Fogerty stated:

We're all so ethnic now, with our long hair and shit. But, when it comes to doing the real crap that civilization needs to keep it going ... who's going to be the garbage collector? None of us will. Most of us will say, "That's beneath me, I ain't gonna do that job".

Fogerty also stated that "It was a challenge really to take a look at yourself. Most of us refuse to get involved with the dirty work of humanity". Creedence Clearwater Revival drummer Doug Clifford later explained:

That's a song that will slap you right in the face...It's a sobering tune, if you listen to the lyrics. It's a period of time when everyone was pointing the finger at our generation saying "This isn't right, this isn't right". But how many people were really going to do something about it? It's real easy to point your finger and knock something, but to get in there and roll up your sleeves and change it for the better these are the real leaders in the world. That song can really ring a chord of truth about a lot of people's basic laws. That's one of my favorite songs, quite frankly. It has everything in it: Great message, nice little beat. Stu has a nice little lick in there. Stu was really an underrated bass player.

Village Voice critic Robert Christgau wrote that the song "manages to encapsulate the class system in two minutes and eight seconds."

"Don't Look Now (It Ain't You or Me)" has a rockabilly melody. Band biographer Craig Hansen Werner calls it "a country-tinged variation on the straight ahead rock and roll of 'Fortunate Son.'" Fogerty biographer Thomas Kitts describes the song as having an "echoey vocal, straightforward backbeat, simple bass line and acoustic guitar" which come together to give it the sound of pre-World War II country music, which Kitts finds consistent with the song's "support of traditional values". Werner points out that in contrast to the hard rocking "Fortunate Son," when Fogerty sings the crucial lines of "Don't Look Now"—Don't look now, someone's done your starvin'/Don't look now, someone's done your prayin' too—he does so quietly, virtually in a whisper.

== Reception ==
Rolling Stone critic Alec Dubro credits "Don't Look Now" for attempting to deal with its difficult issue and for displaying a broader vision than that of most rock lyricists. Timothy Gray stated that, like "Fortunate Son," this song rocks so hard you hardly notice the bald political rhetoric. AllMusic critic Stephen Thomas Erlewine calls it "a great rockabilly spiritual," an "overlooked gem" and "an album favorite." The New Rolling Stone Album Guide critic Rob Sheffield highlighted the "sharp working class anger" of "Don't Look Now" in regarding the song as part of "Fogerty's songwriting peak." In an earlier edition of that book, reviewer Paul Evans stated that "'Fortunate Son' and 'Don't Look Now (It Ain't You or Me)' was the most convincing political rock & roll before the Clash." Village Voice critic Robert Christgau called it a "hidden treasure."

"Don't Look Now (It Ain't You or Me)" was included on several Creedence Clearwater Revival compilation albums, including Chronicle, Vol. 2 in 1986, Keep On Chooglin' in 1999 and Creedence Clearwater Revival: Box Set in 2001. It was also included on the 1980 live album The Concert.

== Minutemen version ==
Punk band Minutemen covered "Don't Look Now" on their 1984 album Double Nickels on the Dime. It is the only song on the album that was not recorded at Radio Tokyo. Although a studio version was recorded, the band decided to accept a suggestion by Joe Carducci to include on the album a live version recorded on a cassette tape at Club Lingerie in Hollywood. Although the recording is imperfect, the fact that audience members can be heard talking during the song enhances the message of the song. The song asks who is going to take care of providing necessities such as food, clothing and shelter. If the audience is gossiping during the song, apparently it will not be them who takes care of it, which throws the question to the listener of the album whether he or she is even paying attention, let alone willing to take responsibility.
