= Pre-Creedence =

Compilation album by the Golliwogs (a.k.a. Creedence Clearwater Revival)
- Released: 1975
- Recorded: 1964–1967
- Length: 33:09
- Label: Fantasy

Creedence Clearwater Revival chronology
Live in Europe (1973)	Pre-Creedence (1975)	Chronicle: The 20 Greatest Hits (1976)

Pre-Creedence is a compilation album by the Golliwogs which changed its name to Creedence Clearwater Revival (CCR) in 1968. This album was released in 1975 after the band had disbanded.

The album consists of tracks recorded and released under the band's prior name, although the final two songs on the album, originally released in 1967 as a Golliwogs single, were re-released as the first CCR single in 1968.

All tracks were reissued on CD as part of Creedence Clearwater Revival: Box Set.

== Track listing ==
All songs written by John Fogerty and Tom Fogerty, except as indicated.

1. "Don't Tell Me No Lies" – 1:55
2. "Little Girl (Does Your Mama Know)" – 2:40
3. "Where You Been" – 2:25
4. "You Came Walking" – 1:49
5. "You Can't Be True" – 2:41
6. "You Got Nothin' on Me" – 2:11
7. "Brown-Eyed Girl" – 2:26
8. "You Better Be Careful" – 2:19
9. "Fight Fire" – 2:22
10. "Fragile Child" – 2:36
11. "Walking on the Water" – 2:29
12. "You Better Get It Before It Gets You" – 2:49
13. "Porterville" – 2:20 (John Fogerty)
14. "Call It Pretending" – 2:07 (John Fogerty)

== Personnel ==
Professional ratings
Review scores
Source	Rating
Allmusic	3/5 stars
Christgau's Record Guide	D

- John Fogerty — lead guitar, vocals; lead vocals (tracks 7, 10–14)
- Tom Fogerty — rhythm guitar, vocals; lead vocals (tracks 1–6, 8, 9)
- Stu Cook — bass
- Doug Clifford — drums
