= Chronicle: Volume Two =

Greatest hits album by Creedence Clearwater Revival
- Released: November 1986
- Recorded: 1968–1972
- Length: 73:55
- Label: Fantasy
- Producer: John Fogerty

Creedence Clearwater Revival chronology
At the Movies (1985)	Chronicle: Volume Two (1986)	Creedence Clearwater Revival: Box Set (2001)

Chronicle: Volume Two, also known by the title including its subtitle as Chronicle: Volume Two - Twenty Great CCR Classics, is a compilation album by Creedence Clearwater Revival, released by Fantasy Records in November 1986. The collection follows Chronicle: The 20 Greatest Hits (1976), which includes all of the CCR's charted hits and remains the band's best-selling album.

The LP version of Chronicle: Volume Two contains an edited version of "Molina", removing the final saxophone solo.

== Critical reception ==
Professional ratings
Review scores
Source	Rating
AllMusic	4/5 stars
The Encyclopedia of Popular Music	4/5 stars
MusicHound	3/5 stars
The Rolling Stone Album Guide	4.5/5 stars

Stephen Thomas Erlewine wrote in an AllMusic review that it "effectively compiles all of the highlights from Creedence Clearwater Revival's career that weren't on the first volume", as it includes album only tracks, he concludes in his review by stating that "Chronicle, Vol. 2 is an ideal choice for listeners who want a little more than the hits, but are unwilling to delve into the albums proper."

== Track listing ==
All tracks are written by John Fogerty, except where noted.

No.	Title	Album	Length
1.	"Walk on the Water" (J. C. Fogerty, Tom Fogerty)	Creedence Clearwater Revival (1968)	4:39
2.	"Susie Q (Part 2)" (Dale Hawkins, Eleanor Broadwater, Stan Lewis)	Creedence Clearwater Revival	4:00
3.	"Born on the Bayou"	Bayou Country (1969)	5:15
4.	"Good Golly Miss Molly" (Robert "Bumps" Blackwell, John Marascalco)	Bayou Country	2:43
5.	"Tombstone Shadow"	Green River (1969)	3:35
6.	"Wrote a Song for Everyone"	Green River	4:53
7.	"Night Time Is the Right Time" (Lew Herman)	Green River	3:05
8.	"Cotton Fields" (Huddie Ledbetter)	Willy and the Poor Boys (1969)	2:56
9.	"It Came Out of the Sky"	Willy and the Poor Boys	2:57
10.	"Don't Look Now (It Ain't You or Me)"	Willy and the Poor Boys	2:08
11.	"The Midnight Special" (Traditional; arr. J. C. Fogerty)	Willy and the Poor Boys	4:10
12.	"Before You Accuse Me" (Ellas McDaniel)	Cosmo's Factory (1970)	3:25
13.	"My Baby Left Me" (Arthur Crudup)	Cosmo's Factory	2:15
14.	"Pagan Baby"	Pendulum (1970)	6:25
15.	"(Wish I Could) Hideaway"	Pendulum	3:40
16.	"It's Just a Thought"	Pendulum	3:46
17.	"Molina" (vinyl releases feature edited version 2:05; CD version is full 2:41)	Pendulum	2:41
18.	"Born to Move"	Pendulum	5:39
19.	"Lookin' for a Reason"	Mardi Gras (1972)	3:23
20.	"Hello Mary Lou" (Gene Pitney)	Mardi Gras	2:15
Total length:			73:55

== Personnel ==
Per liner notes

- John Fogerty – vocals, lead guitar, producer, arranger
- Tom Fogerty – rhythm guitar (except "Lookin’ for a Reason" and "Hello, Mary Lou")
- Stu Cook – bass
- Doug Clifford – drums
- Gary Hobish – digital mastering
- Phil Carroll – art direction, design
- Dieter Zill – photography

== Charts ==
Chart (2026)	Peak position
Greek Albums (IFPI)	48
