= Willy and the Poor Boys =

Studio album by Creedence Clearwater Revival
- Released: November 1969
- Studio: Wally Heider (San Francisco)
- Genres: Swamp rock; blues rock; Southern rock; Americana
- Length: 34:31
- Label: Fantasy
- Producer: John Fogerty

Creedence Clearwater Revival chronology
Green River (1969)	Willy and the Poor Boys (1969)	Cosmo's Factory (1970)

Singles from Willy and the Poor Boys
- 1. "Down on the Corner" / "Fortunate Son" Released: October 1969

Willy and the Poor Boys is the fourth studio album by the American rock band Creedence Clearwater Revival, released on November 2, 1969, by Fantasy Records. It was the last of three studio albums the band released that year, arriving just three months after Green River. In 2020, Rolling Stone ranked the album number 193 on its list of the "500 Greatest Albums of All Time".

== Background ==
By the fall of 1969, Creedence Clearwater Revival was one of the most popular rock bands in the world, having scored three consecutive No. 2 singles and the No. 1 album Green River. In addition, the group had performed at the landmark Woodstock Festival in August and made several high-profile television appearances, including The Ed Sullivan Show. John Fogerty had assumed control of the band after several years of futility, but, despite their growing success, the other members – bassist Stu Cook, drummer Doug Clifford and guitarist Tom Fogerty, John's older brother – began to chafe under Fogerty's leadership. In 1969, the band released three full-length albums while also fulfilling touring commitments. "That was a bit of overkill and I never did understand that," Clifford stated to Jeb Wright of Goldmine in 2013, "Fogerty told us that if we were ever off the charts, then we would be forgotten... To make it worse, it might sound funny, but we had double-sided hits, and that was kind of a curse, as we were burning through material twice as fast. If we'd spread it out, we would not have had to put out three albums in one year." On that point, Fogerty told Guitar World's Harold Steinblatt in 1998, "Everyone advised me against putting out great B-sides. They'd tell me I was wasting potential hits. And I looked at them and said, 'Baloney. Look at the Beatles. Look at Elvis. It's the quickest way to show them all that good music." Shortly after the release of Green River, CCR began recording songs for Willy and the Poor Boys.

== Conception ==
Originally, the album was planned to be formed around a concept introduced in "Down on the Corner", with Creedence taking on the identity of an old-time jug band called "Willy and The Poor Boys". However, this was dropped rather quickly, except for the song "Poorboy Shuffle" and the album cover itself, where the band remains in character. "Down on the Corner" chronicles the tale of the fictional band Willy and the Poor Boys, and how they play on street corners to cheer people up and ask for nickels. The song makes reference to a washboard, a kazoo, a Kalamazoo Guitar, and a gut bass.

When the band members were finalizing the album, they and photographer Basul Parik went over to the intersection of Peralta St. and Hollis St. in Oakland, California, and shot the cover photograph at Duck Kee Market, owned by Ruby Lee.

== Music ==
"Fortunate Son" is a counterculture era anti-war anthem, criticizing militant patriotic behavior and those who support the use of military force without having to pay the costs themselves (either financially or by serving in a wartime military). The song was inspired by the wedding of David Eisenhower, the grandson of United States President Dwight D. Eisenhower, to Julie Nixon, the daughter of President Richard Nixon, in 1968. Fogerty told Rolling Stone:

Julie Nixon was hanging around with David Eisenhower, and you just had the feeling that none of these people were going to be involved with the war. In 1968, the majority of the country thought morale was great among the troops, and eighty percent of them were in favor of the war. But to some of us who were watching closely, we just knew we were headed for trouble.

In 1993, Fogerty confessed to Rolling Stone's Michael Goldberg, "It was written, of course, during the Nixon era, and well, let's say I was very non-supportive of Mr. Nixon." The song has been widely used to protest military actions and elitism in Western society, particularly in the United States; as an added consequence of its popularity, it has even been used in completely unrelated situations, such as, to Fogerty's disdain, advertise Wrangler blue jeans. It attracted criticism when Bruce Springsteen, Dave Grohl, and Zac Brown performed the song together at the November 2014 Concert for Valor in Washington, D.C. Fogerty, a military veteran, defended their song choice.

Fogerty's revulsion with President Nixon can also be found on the album's closing track, "Effigy". In 2013 the singer-songwriter told David Cavanagh of Uncut that the tune was his response to Nixon emerging from the White House one afternoon and sneering at the anti-war demonstrators outside, with Fogerty remembering, "He said, 'Nothing you do here today will have any effect on me. I'm going back inside to watch the football game.'"

"Don't Look Now" displays Fogerty's concern for the working poor ("Who will take the coal from the mine? Who will take the salt from the earth?"). As recounted in the VH1 Legends episode on the band, Fogerty once stated to Time magazine, "I see things through lower class eyes."

The Chuck Berry-guitar romp "It Came Out of the Sky" tells the tale of a farmer who finds a UFO in his field and unwittingly becomes the most famous man in America. The album also includes two instrumental tracks in "Poorboy Shuffle" and "Side o' the Road", the former of which segues directly into the song "Feelin' Blue."

The album contains two songs associated with blues and folk legend Lead Belly: "Cotton Fields" and "The Midnight Special". In 2012, Fogerty explained to Uncut, "Lead Belly was a big influence. I learned about him through Pete Seeger. When you listen to those guys, you're getting down to the root of the tree." In 1982, the band's rendition of "Cotton Fields" made No. 50 on Billboard magazine's Country Singles chart. and No. 1 in Mexico.

== Release ==
Willy and the Poor Boys was released in November 1969 as Fantasy 8397, and in 1970 made the Top 50 in six countries, including France, where it reached No. 1. On December 16, 1970, the Recording Industry Association of America certified the album gold (500,000 units sold). Almost 20 years later, on December 13, 1990, the album was certified platinum (million units sold) and 2× platinum (2 million units sold). The only single released from the album,"Down on the Corner" b/w "Fortunate Son" peaked at No. 3 on December 20, 1969, on the Hot 100.

The band promoted the album with performances on The Music Scene where the band performed as Willy and the Poor Boys, and the Ed Sullivan show in late 1969.

== Reception ==
Professional ratings
Review scores
Source	Rating
AllMusic	5/5 stars
Blender	5/5 stars
Encyclopedia of Popular Music	4/5 stars
Rolling Stone (original)	(favorable)
Rolling Stone (40th Ann.)	4/5 stars
The Village Voice	A+

The album was well received, exemplified by the original review in Rolling Stone, which stated it was the band's "best one yet". In a contemporary review for The Village Voice, Robert Christgau also believed it was the group's best record and wrote, "Fogerty's subtlety as a political songwriter (have you ever really dug the words of 'Fortunate Son'?) comes as no surprise." He later included it in his "Basic Record Library" of 1950s and 1960s recordings, published in Christgau's Record Guide: Rock Albums of the Seventies (1981).

In a retrospective review, AllMusic editor Stephen Thomas Erlewine called the album "one of the greatest pure rock & roll albums ever cut". He contrasted Willy and the Poor Boys with CCR's previous album, Green River, saying the songs on this album are softer and more upbeat, except for "Effigy". Erlewine went on to state that "Fortunate Son" is not as dated as most of the other protest songs of the era, though he also felt the song was a little out of place on the album, and compared "Poorboy Shuffle" to songs performed by jug bands. In the Blender magazine review of the album, it was called the opposite of Sgt. Pepper's Lonely Hearts Club Band and psychedelic rock, which the reviewer felt was because of the band's performance at the Woodstock Festival. For his Rolling Stone review of the album's 40th anniversary reissue, Barry Walters called it "relaxed" and gave credit to Fogerty for writing a protest song, "Fortunate Son", that has a good beat to it.

In 2003, the album was ranked number 392 on Rolling Stone's list of the 500 greatest albums of all time; the 2012 edition of the list had it ranked number 309, and the 2020 edition of the list included the album at number 193.

The album was remastered and reissued on 180-gram vinyl by Analogue Productions in 2006. On June 10, 2008, it was remastered and released by Concord Music Group as a compact disc, with three bonus tracks.

== Track listing ==
All tracks are written by John Fogerty, except where noted.

Side one
No.	Title	Writer(s)	Length
1.	"Down on the Corner"		2:46
2.	"It Came Out of the Sky"		2:53
3.	"Cotton Fields"	Huddie Ledbetter	2:56
4.	"Poorboy Shuffle" (instrumental)		2:25
5.	"Feelin' Blue"		5:06

Side two
No.	Title	Writer(s)	Length
1.	"Fortunate Son"		2:19
2.	"Don't Look Now (It Ain't You or Me)"		2:11
3.	"The Midnight Special"	Traditional, arr. John Fogerty	4:13
4.	"Side o' the Road" (instrumental)		3:24
5.	"Effigy"		6:26

40th Anniversary Edition CD bonus tracks
No.	Title	Length
11.	"Fortunate Son" (live in Manchester, September 1, 1971)	2:13
12.	"It Came Out of the Sky" (live in Berlin, September 16, 1971, recorded for Live in Europe)	3:26
13.	"Down on the Corner" (jam with Booker T. & the M.G.'s)	2:49

== Personnel ==
Per liner notes.

Creedence Clearwater Revival

- John Fogerty – lead vocals, lead guitar, piano, maracas, cowbell, harmonica (4), producer, arranger
- Tom Fogerty – rhythm guitar (all but 11, 12), backing vocals
- Stu Cook – bass, washtub bass (4), backing vocals
- Doug Clifford – drums, washboard (4)

Additional musicians

- Booker T. Jones – organ (13)
- Steve Cropper – guitar (13)
- Donald "Duck" Dunn – bass (13)
- Al Jackson, Jr. – drums (13)

Production

- Basul Parik – photography
- Chris Clough – 2008 compilation producer
- Ed Ward – 2008 liner notes
- Joel Selvin – 2008 liner notes
- Rikka Arnold – project assistance
- Bill Belmont – project assistance
- Jennifer Peters – project assistance

== Charts ==
Chart performance for Willy and the Poor Boys
Chart (1970)	Peak position
Australian Albums (Kent Music Report)	2
Canada Top Albums/CDs (RPM)	2
Dutch Albums (Album Top 100)	3
German Albums (Offizielle Top 100)	25
Finnish Albums (The Official Finnish Charts)	3
Italian Albums (Musica e Dischi)	17
Japanese Albums (Oricon)	11
Norwegian Albums (VG-lista)	2
UK Albums (Official Charts)	10
US Billboard 200	3
US Top R&B/Hip-Hop Albums (Billboard)	28

== Certifications ==
Certifications for Willy and the Poor Boys
Region	Certification	Certified units/sales
Denmark (IFPI Danmark)	Gold	10,000^{‡}
New Zealand (RMNZ)	2× Platinum	30,000^{‡}
United States (RIAA)	2× Platinum	2,000,000^{^}
^{^} Shipments figures based on certification alone.^{‡} Sales+streaming figures based on certification alone.
