= Singing the Blues (Big Joe Turner album) =

Studio album by Joe Turner
- Released: 1967
- Recorded: 1967
- Genre: Blues
- Length: 37:44
- Label: BluesWay; BLS 6006
- Producer: Bob Thiele

Joe Turner chronology
Joe Turner and Jimmy Nelson (1963)	Singing the Blues (1967)	The Real Boss of the Blues (1969)

Singing the Blues (also reissued as Roll 'Em) is an album by blues vocalist Joe Turner recorded in 1967 and originally released by the BluesWay label.

== Reception ==
Professional ratings
Review scores
Source	Rating
AllMusic	3/5 stars

AllMusic reviewer Scott Yanow stated "Backed by some top studio players of the era the 56-year old classic blues singer shows that he was still in prime form. Nothing too surprising occurs other than the fact that the ten songs are all Turner's originals. Best-known are the two vintage hits "Roll 'Em Pete" and "Cherry Red" while some of the newer tunes are more forgettable although still delivered with spirit.".

== Track listing ==
All compositions by Joe Turner except where noted

1. "Well Oh Well" − 3:21
2. "Joe's Blues" − 5:16
3. "Bluer Than Blue" − 2:48
4. "Big Wheel" − 2:44
5. "Poor House" − 4:50
6. "Piney Brown Blues" (Joe Turner, Pete Johnson) − 4:12
7. "Mrs. Geraldine" − 3:40
8. "Since I Was Your Man" − 5:28
9. "Roll 'Em Pete" (Turner, Johnson) − 2:48
10. "Cherry Red" (Turner, Johnson) − 2:55

== Personnel ==
- Joe Turner − vocals
- Patti Bown − piano
- Thornel Schwartz, Wally Richardson − guitar
- Bob Bushnell − bass guitar
- Herbie Lovelle (tracks 1, 2, 8 & 9), Panama Francis (Tracks 3–7 & 10) – drums
- Buddy Lucas − tenor saxophone, harmonica
