= The Real Boss of the Blues =

Studio album by Joe Turner
- Released: 1969
- Recorded: 1969
- Studio: Los Angeles, California
- Genre: Blues
- Length: 34:24
- Label: BluesTime; BTS-9002
- Producer: Bob Thiele

Joe Turner chronology
Singing the Blues (1967)	The Real Boss of the Blues (1969)	Super Black Blues (1969)

The Real Boss of the Blues is an album by blues vocalist Joe Turner recorded in 1969 and originally released by the BluesTime label.

== Reception ==
Professional ratings
Review scores
Source	Rating
AllMusic	3.5/5 stars

AllMusic reviewer Stephen Thomas Erlewine stated "Turner was roughly 13 years removed from his peak and certainly willing to do whatever it took to get back in the studio and maybe the charts, so he followed producer Thiele through Gene Page arrangements that updated his classic jumpers of the '50s. ... It's not vintage Turner but it's worthy: it's one of the rare late-'60s blues LPs that feels of its time yet is connected to the past".

== Track listing ==
1. "Shake, Rattle and Roll" (Charles Calhoun) − 3:04
2. "Lonesome Train" (Traditional) − 2:43
3. "Corrine, Corrina" (Traditional) − 3:03
4. "How Long, How Long Blues" (Leroy Carr) − 3:20
5. "Careless Love" (Traditional) − 2:57
6. "Two Loves Have I" (Ted Murrell) − 2:00
7. "Honey Hush" (Lou Turner) − 6:36
8. "Plastic Man" (Len Chandler) − 10:41

== Personnel ==
- Joe Turner − vocals
- Unidentified orchestra arranged and conducted by Gene Page
