= Otto Gray and his Oklahoma Cowboys =

1920s American western music band

McGinty's Oklahoma Cowboy Band
- Origin: Ripley, Oklahoma, USA
- Genre: Western
- Years active: c. 1921 – c. 1926
- Label: OKeh
- Past members: Johnny Bennett; Ernest Bevins; Dave "Pistol Pete" Cutrell; H.C. Hackney; Paul Harrison; U.E. Moore; Guy Messecar; Marie Mitchell; Frank Sherrill; J.E. Mainer

Otto Gray and the Oklahoma Cowboys
- Origin: Ripley, Oklahoma, USA
- Genre: Western
- Years active: c. 1926 – c. 1937
- Label: Vocalion Gennett Melotone
- Past members: Lee "Zeke" Allen; Wade "Hy" Allen; Zeke Clements; Bill Crane "Booger" Fields; Whitey Ford; Florence "Mommie" Gray; Owen "Zeb" Gray; Polly Jenkins "Chief" Sanders; Rube Tronson; Fred Wilson; *NOTE: Zeke Clements played with another band, Ken Hackley's Oklahoma Cowboys

Otto Gray and his Oklahoma Cowboys were the first nationally famous cowboy western music band in the United States, and the first cowboy band to appear on the cover of Billboard (June 6, 1931).

Formed in Ripley, Oklahoma in the early 1920s, the band was first known as McGinty's Oklahoma Cowboy Band, for the leader, Billy McGinty, a well-known cowboy, former Rough Rider, and world champion rider with Buffalo Bill's show.

The band members were authentic cowboys from ranches in and around Ripley. Their first promoter, George Youngblood, introduced them saying, "I wish to say of this bunch of cowboys that they are not only good fiddlers, but can ride or rope anything that has horns, hide or hair." After McGinty left to become the postmaster of Ripley, Otto Gray (1884–1967), took over as bandleader as well as manager. With the extensive traveling generated from their popularity, the original band members dropped out to stay with their jobs and families. Gray filled their places with professional musicians willing to spend most of their time on the road.

Playing on the vaudeville circuits in the Midwest and Northeast, and nationwide over some 130 radio stations, they played the first cowboy music most Americans outside of the West had ever heard.

One of their most popular tunes was "Midnight Special", performed by member Dave "Pistol Pete" Cutrell; Cutrell's "Pistol Pete's Midnight Special" with McGinty's band was also the first version of "Midnight Special" ever recorded.

The band lasted until the early 1930s when economic situations led them to disband.

== Selected discography ==
Original recording dates.

Recording Date	Matrix No.	Title	Record label
May 1926	9648-A	"Cow Boy's Dream"	OKeh 45057
May 1926	9650-1	"Pistol Pete's Midnight Special"	OKeh 45057
January 17, 1928	13365-A	"It Can't Be Done"	Gennett 6376
January 17, 1928	13366	"Adam And Eve"	Gennett 6376
January 17, 1928	13367	"Lone Prairie"	Gennett unissued
January 17, 1928	13368	"Your Mother Still Prays For You, Jack"	Gennett 6387
January 28, 1928	13407	"It Can't Be Done"	Champion 15446
January 28, 1928	13408	"Adam and Eve"	Gennett unissued
January 28, 1928	13409	"Bury Me On The Lone Prairie"	Gennett 6405
January 28, 1928	13411	"Drunkards Lone Child"	Gennett 6405
January 28, 1928	13412	"In the Baggage Coach Ahead"	Gennett 6387
September 17, 1928	C-2317	"It Can't Be Done"	Vocalion 5250
September 17, 1928	C-2318	"Adam and Eve"	Vocalion 5250
September 17, 1928	C-2319	"Tom Cat Blues"	Vocalion 5267
September 17, 1928	C-2320	"Coon Hunt"	Vocalion 5267
October 1928	C-2435	"Your Mother Still Prays For You, Jack"	Vocalion 5301
October 1928	C-2436	"Be Home Early Tonight My Dear Boy"	Vocalion 5301
October 1928	C-2437	"Barefoot Boy With Boots On"	Vocalion 5256
October 1928	C-2438	"I Had But Fifty Cents"	Vocalion 5256
March 12 or 13, 1929	C-3108	"Plant A Watermelon On My Grave"	Vocalion 5327
March 12 or 13, 1929	C-3109	"The Terrible Marriage"	Vocalion 5327
March 12 or 13, 1929	C-3110	"I Can't Change It"	Vocalion 5337
March 12 or 13, 1929	C-3111	"Midnight Special"	Vocalion 5337
May 20, 1930	g-16635	"Down Where the Swanee River Flows"	Champion 16027
May 20, 1930	g-16636	"Gathering Up the Shells From the Seashore"	Champion 16027
February 16, 1931	E-35856	"Who Stole The Lock On The Henhouse Door"	Melotone M12182 Vocalion 5479
February 16, 1931	E-35857	"Cat Came Back"	Melotone M12127
February 16, 1931	E-35858	"Suckin' Cider"	Melotone M12127
February 16, 1931	E-35859	"When You Come To the End of the Day"	Melotone M12223
February 16, 1931	E-35860	"4000 Years Ago"	Melotone M12182 Vocalion 5479
February 16, 1931	E-35861	"Mammy's Little Coal Black Rose"	Melotone M 12223

== Bibliography ==
- Chlouber, Carla. "Otto Gray and his Oklahoma Cowboys: The Country's First Commercial Western Band". Chronicles of Oklahoma, (Winter, 1997–98) 75:4 356-383.
- Cohen, Norm. Long Steel Rail: The Railroad in American Folksong. University of Illinois Press (2nd ed), 2000. ISBN 0-252-06881-5
- Kite, Steve. "Billy McGinty & His Cowboy Band Take to the Air" (transcription). Oklahoma Audio Almanac. Oklahoma State University, May 9, 2001.
- McRill, Leslie A. "Music in Oklahoma by the Billy McGinty Cowboy Band". Chronicles of Oklahoma, (Spring, 1960) 38:1 66-74.
- Otto Gray's Oklahoma Cowboys. Early Cowboy Band. British Archive of Country Music, CD D 139, 2006.
- Russell, Tony. Country Music Records: A Discography, 1921-1942. Oxford University Press, 2004. ISBN 0-19-513989-5
- Shirley, Glenn "Daddy of the Cowboy Bands. Oklahoma Today (Fall 1959), 9:4 6-7, 29.
- Wolfe, Charles K. and James E. Akenson (eds). Women of Country Music: A Reader. University Press of Kentucky, 2003. ISBN 0-8131-2280-5
