= Gibson Kalamazoo =

American budget musical instrument line

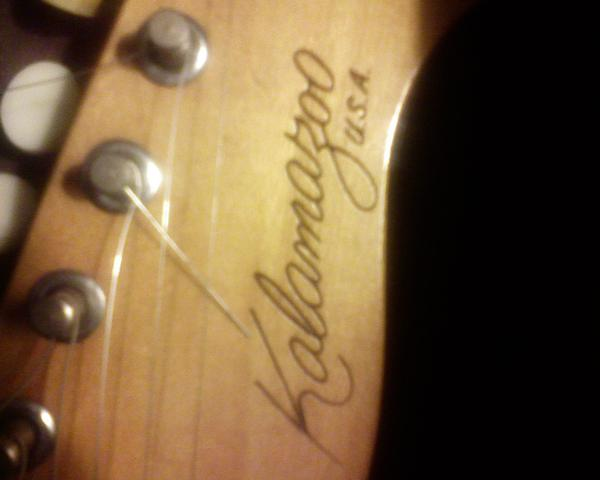
Logo, located on the headstock.

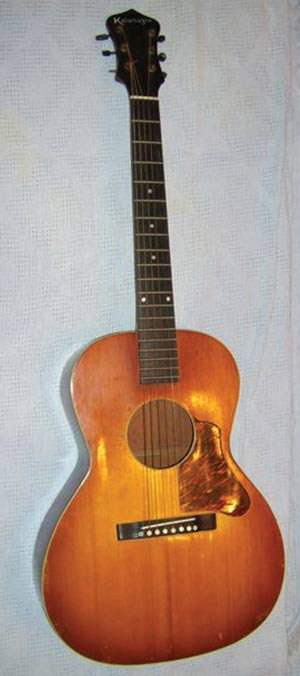
Kalamazoo KG-14

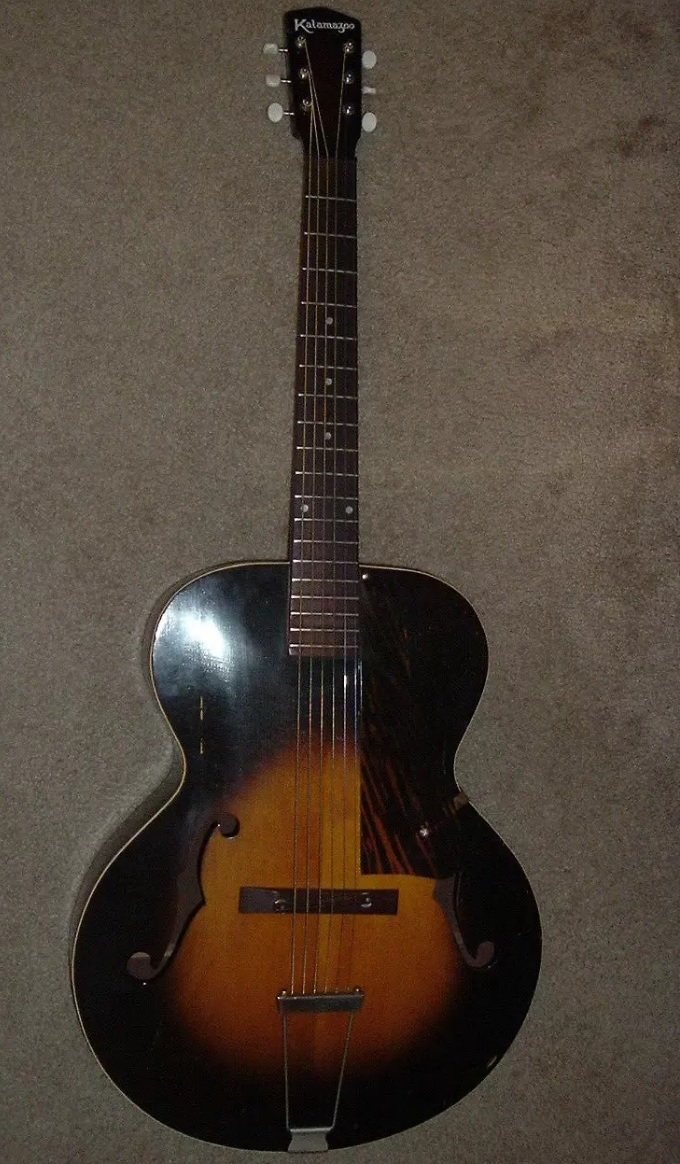
Kalamazoo KG-31a (1930s)

Kalamazoo is the name for two different lines of instruments produced by Gibson. In both cases Kalamazoo was a budget brand. The first consisted of such instruments as archtop, flat top and lap steel guitars, banjos, and mandolins made between 1933 and 1942, and the second, from 1965 to 1970, had solid-body electric and bass guitars.

== First series ==
The first line of instruments included guitars with bodies between 14" and 16", which in 2009 were worth up to $1800.

== Second series ==
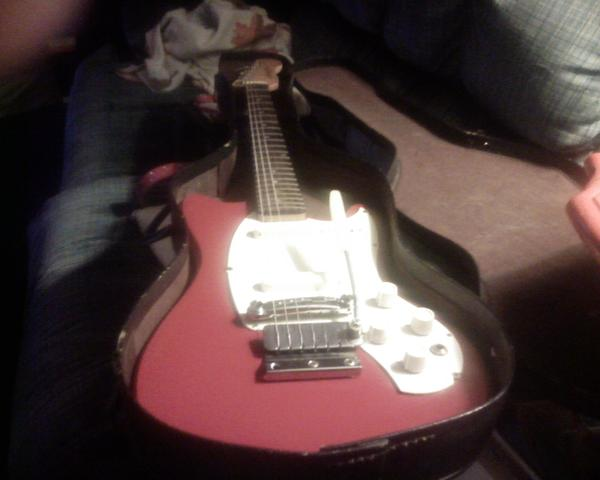
A Gibson Kalamazoo KG-2A Electric Guitar.

The name was revived during the guitar boom of the late 1960s; at the time, guitar manufacturers "could sell just about anything they could make or lay their hands on". Gibson already had the Epiphone brand which it used to market more affordable guitars, but Epiphone was already a mid-level brand and Gibson desired something truly cheap. The Kalamazoo brand, whose guitars had bolt-on necks, filled that slot. "USA" was added to the name on the headstock to set it apart from cheaper, imported guitars.

While the bolt-neck design was already a money saver, Gibson sought cheaper materials as well and found them in MDF. Money was also saved on the pickguard (a single sheet of plastic, not laminated) and the (open-back) tuners.

=== Electric guitars ===
The first design, made from 1965 to 1966, was really a copy of the Fender Mustang; the second, made from 1967 to 1969, resembled the Gibson SG. See Kalamazoo KG series shipping figures. Models were the KG-1 (with one single-coil pickup), KG-1A (single-coil pickup and tremolo arm), KG-2 (dual single-coil pickups), and KG-2A (dual single-coil pickups and tremolo). Guitars were built at Gibson's old electronics plant in Kalamazoo, Michigan, not the main Parsons street factory.

=== Electric bass ===
The Kalamazoo Bass was introduced in 1966 and like the guitar model had two body styles resembling the Mustang and the SG. The earlier headstocks were, again, reminiscent of Fender models. Later headstocks bore a resemblance to that of the Gibson Thunderbird bass guitar. Several standard Gibson components were used in the KB, namely a typical EB series humbucker pickup used in many Epiphone basses. Sales were initially good, and during 1966-67 this was by far the best selling bass made at the Gibson plant. Production of the KB ceased in 1969.

=== Amplifiers ===
Simultaneously Gibson produced a line of Kalamazoo amplifiers, marketed primarily as budget model practice amps. The first amp introduced, the Model One, began production in 1965 along with the guitars. It was followed in 1966 by the Model Two. Both used vacuum tubes for preamplification, rectification, and output. Both had roughly a 5W output and a 10" Alnico speaker manufactured by Chicago Telephone Systems (CTS). Both models had volume and tone controls, but Model 2 added a tremolo knob, which set the tremolo frequency or switched it off; there was no tremolo depth control. The circuitry in the Kalamazoo Model Two is similar to the Gibson GA-5T Skylark amplifier of the same time period, as well as the Sano-ette made by Sano Amplifiers of New Jersey.

The last of tube-style Models One and Two were given a brown, wooden look faceplate instead of the previous black panel, and are sometimes referred to as "brownface Zoo's" by Kalamazoo enthusiasts. Before ceasing production, Chicago Musical Instruments offered a solid state Model Two with a silver face place. These are actually labeled as "Model Two", but lacking the vintage "tube" sound, they do not enjoy the same collectible status as the black and brown faced models.

Many today do not consider these models as desirable for use with guitars. However, they are fairly sought after by blues harmonica players for use in amplifying their sound with microphones due to their natural distortion and harmonics. But the relatively small output and the naturally higher frequencies of the EL84 power tubes often lead the Model One and Model Two to be used for studio recording, practice or performance in a smaller setting.

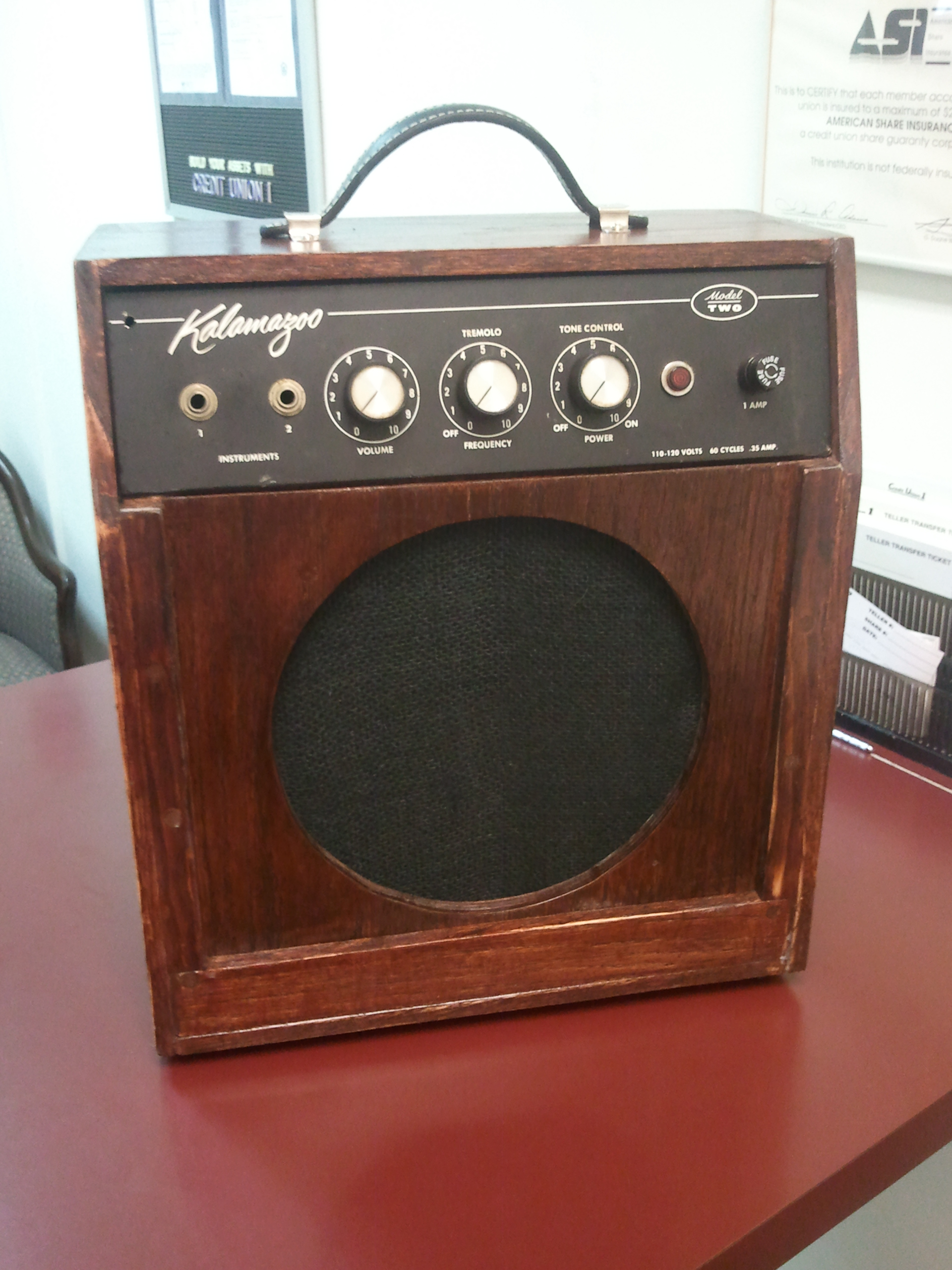
Kalamazoo Model Two amplifier with a modified cabinet built from solid oak.

Around 1969, solid state versions of the Models One and Two were issued in very limited numbers. These were renamed Model 3 and Model 4 respectively. These models, while novel in their day, ultimately proved unpopular.

The Kalamazoo Reverb 12 was introduced as a larger, more powerful amplifier, boasting a 12W push-pull tube driven output through a 10" speaker. The Reverb 12 featured a better tremolo circuit than the Model 2, including depth control along with frequency. The tone was managed by individual bass and treble controls as opposed to the single tone control on earlier models, and boasted a spring reverb.

Gibson also produced Kalamazoo bass amplifiers. The tube-driven Bass 30 and Bass 50 were both equipped with a pair of 10" Jensen speakers. These came in different confiurations over time: in one version the speakers were side by side with a flip-out control panel that became flush with the back of the cabinet when not in use; a vertical speaker configuration with a flip out panel; and a vertical configuration with a wood finish slanted panel like the guitar amps. The final models were simply labeled "Bass" without a number. The last run was apparently solid state instead of tube driven.

In its 1969 album Willy and the Poor Boys, the band Creedence Clearwater Revival's song "Down on the Corner" tells the story of a street corner band with hodge-podge instruments like a washboard, gut bass and kazoo. Also included is the line: "Poorboy twangs the rhythm out on his Kalamazoo" a reference to the budget line of guitars that Gibson produced. The song peaked at #3 on the Hot 100 on 20 December 1969.
