= Teenage Letter =

Song written by Renald Richard

Single by Big Joe Turner
- Released: 1957
- Label: Atlantic
- Songwriter(s): Renald Richard

"Teenage Letter" is a song written by Renald Richard.

The original version (spelled "Teen Age Letter" on the record label) was recorded in October 1957 by Big Joe Turner and released as a single (Atlantic 45–1167) in the same year.

The song has since been covered by a number of artists, including Billy Lee Riley and Jerry Lee Lewis.
