= Traditional blues verses =

Lyrics used to fill blues performances

In the folk tradition, there are many traditional blues verses that have been sung over and over by many artists. Blues singers, who include many country and folk artists as well as those commonly identified with blues singers, use these traditional lyrics to fill out their blues performances. Artists like Jimmie Rodgers, the "blue yodeler", and Big Joe Turner, "the Boss of the Blues" compiled virtual encyclopedias of lyrics. Turner reputedly could sing the blues for hours without repeating himself.

== Terminology ==
Traditional blues verses in folk-music tradition have also been called floating lyrics or maverick stanzas. Floating lyrics have been described as “lines that have circulated so long in folk communities that tradition-steeped singers call them instantly to mind and rearrange them constantly, and often unconsciously, to suit their personal and community aesthetics”.

== Examples ==
Although many blues songs, such as "Jelly Jelly" or "St. Louis Blues" are composed in the usual fashion with lyrics focusing on a single theme and telling a story, many others, like "Roll 'Em Pete" or "T for Texas" combine one or two new verses with a flock of traditional ones.

Traditional blues verses are most common in twelve bar blues, with the characteristic repeated first line (indicated here by ×2).

Some examples:

See that spider crawlin' up that wall (×2)
He's crawlin up there to get his ashes hauled.

I'll be your little dog till your big dog comes (×2)
And when the big dog gets here, don't tell him what the puppy done

Rebecca, Rebecca, get your big legs off of me (×2)
It may be sending you baby but it's worryin' the hell out of me.

I'm gonna buy me a pistol with a great long shiny barr'l (×2)
Gonna shoot that rounder who stole away my gal

If you see me comin', heist your window high (×2)
If you see me goin', baby, hang your head and cry.

If your house catches fire and there ain't no water 'round (×2)
Throw your rags out the window, let the doggone shack burn down.

=== "Traditional lyrics" of known origin ===
Some lyrics crop up in song after song, such as:

I got a gal, lawd she big and fat (×2)
Because it's tight, because it's tight like that

From "Yo-Yo Blues No. 2" by Barbecue Bob

I got a girl, say she long and tall (×2)
She sleeps in the kitchen with her feets in the hall

From "They're Red Hot" by Robert Johnson

I got a gal who's ten feet tall, Little Liza Jane
With her feet in the cellar and her head in the hall, Little Liza Jane

From "Little Liza Jane," American trad.

=== Sea shanties ===
As we barrel around Cape Horn,
Wish to God you'd never been born.

When I was a young man in me prime
I’d take them yaller gals two at a time.
