= Live in Europe (Creedence Clearwater Revival album) =

Live album by Creedence Clearwater Revival
- Released: October 16, 1973
- Recorded: September 4–28, 1971
- Genre: Swamp rock
- Length: 51:02
- Label: Fantasy
- Producer: DSR

Creedence Clearwater Revival chronology
More Creedence Gold (1973)	Live in Europe (1973)	Pre-Creedence (1975)

Professional ratings
Review scores
Source	Rating
AllMusic	3/5 stars
Encyclopedia of Popular Music	2/5 stars

Live in Europe is the first live album by American rock band Creedence Clearwater Revival. Although released in 1973, it was recorded in 1971 during the Pendulum tour.

== Overview ==
The album documents the band performing as a trio, following Tom Fogerty's departure. It was released, despite John Fogerty's strong objections, after his final struggles with Fantasy Records over his songwriting. In 1973, Fogerty said he would never play a Creedence song again, as it would only benefit Fantasy Records—a promise he kept for some 20 years.

== Track listing ==
All songs by John Fogerty, except where noted.

Side one

1. "Born on the Bayou" – 5:05
2. "Green River/Susie Q" (Fogerty/Dale Hawkins, Eleanor Broadwater, Stan Lewis) – 4:31
3. "It Came Out of the Sky" – 3:11

Side two

1. "Door to Door" (Stu Cook) – 2:00
2. "Travelin' Band" – 2:12
3. "Fortunate Son" – 2:25
4. "Commotion" – 2:34
5. "Lodi" – 3:15

Side three

1. "Bad Moon Rising" – 2:13
2. "Proud Mary" – 2:52
3. "Up Around the Bend" – 2:42
4. "Hey Tonight" – 2:30
5. "Sweet Hitch-Hiker" – 3:05

Side four

1. "Keep on Chooglin'" (with an interpolation of "Pagan Baby" from about 4:45–6:35) – 12:47

A budget-priced 1987 reissue of the album omitted "Door to Door" and "Sweet Hitch-Hiker" (the studio versions of which were both originally recorded by the band as a trio) to fit the album on a single LP. When the album was remastered and issued on CD by Fantasy Records in 1999, the two missing songs were restored.

== Personnel ==
- John Fogerty – guitars, harmonica, lead vocals
- Stu Cook – bass guitar, vocals, lead vocals on "Door to Door"
- Doug Clifford – drums

== Charts ==
Chart (1973)	Peak position
Australian Albums (Kent Music Report)	72
Japanese Albums (Oricon)	30
US Billboard 200	143
