= It Came Out of the Sky =

- Cover to Spanish single release on America Records

Single by Creedence Clearwater Revival

from the album Willy and the Poor Boys
- B-side: "Side O the Road" (UK); "Cotton Fields" (Spain)
- Released: 1970
- Recorded: 1969, Fantasy Studios, Berkeley, California
- Genre: Rock; rock and roll
- Length: 2:53
- Label: Fantasy Records
- Songwriter(s): John Fogerty
- Producer(s): John Fogerty

"It Came Out of the Sky" is a song written by John Fogerty that was included on Creedence Clearwater Revival's 1969 album Willy and the Poor Boys. It was also released as a single in some countries and has appeared on several of the group's compilation albums. It was included occasionally in the group's live set even after John Fogerty left the group and the remaining members reformed as Creedence Clearwater Revisited.

== Lyrics and music ==
"It Came Out of the Sky" is a satirical song and one of Creedence Clearwater Revival's first forays into political themes. The lyrics describe what happens when an object, presumably a meteorite or flying saucer, falls on the property of a farmer named Jody in Moline, Illinois. Various politicians and other figures attempt to use the incident for their own purposes. Then United States Vice President Spiro Agnew wants to use the incident to impose a tax on Mars. Then Governor of California Ronald Reagan, called "Ronnie the Populist" in the song, claims it is part of a communist plot. The pope claims it is evidence that "the Lord has come." The movie industry quickly makes an epic film out of the incident. Newscasters Walter Cronkite and Eric Sevareid interview Jody. The Vatican and the White House argue over who should keep it. Finally, Jody gets the last word by claiming possession of it and offering it for sale at the exorbitant price of $17 million.

Fogerty biographer Thomas Kitts explains that the song "draws on Chuck Berry rhythms, guitar licks and crisp storytelling. The Guardian contributor Geoffrey Cannon similarly commented that the "hard, exhilarating, self-confident" guitar work was inspired by Berry. San Francisco Examiner critic Philip Elwood described the song as "a lively rock 'n' roll vehicle combining a wild vocal and absolutely perfectly styled instrumental ensemble." The Dispatch critic Dink Lorance describes the song as "an old-style rock and roller."

Kitts interprets the song as exposing the "self-centeredness and limited vision of politicians, religious leaders, and the media, all of whom exploit events for aggrandizement and self-promotion" but they are all outsmarted by a simple Midwestern farmer. He regards the song as being "a more humorous, less bitter attack on officials and institutions than we see elsewhere in Fogerty" and that it "champions the working classes who through efficiency and practicality get things done and are not so simple as the empowered think." Cannon compares the song to the Dillards' "The Biggest Whatever" in that in both songs an enormous object falls from the sky onto the American countryside. Cannon interprets the large object as "a metaphor for an idea, too big to be assimilated into the old ideas just as the world would turn upside down for anyone who saw an ant a foot long."

== Reception ==
Rolling Stone critic Alec Dubro praises the song as being "as funny as Dylan at his best" and for being able to "get three worlds of paranoia into one short, entertaining, musical song." Dubro also asserts that the song successfully reconciles Fogerty's insistence that listeners put too much weight on political references in songs with Fogerty's belief that a song can have a message by being "message and comment without moralizing."

The New Rolling Stone Album Guide critic Rob Sheffield highlighted the "sharp working class anger" of "It Came Out of the Sky" in regarding the song as part of "Fogerty's songwriting peak." Allmusic critic Stephen Thomas Erlewine claims that "It Came Out of the Sky" is one of Creedence Clearwater Revival's best performances. Elwood called it "great stuff, supported by pure 8-to-the-bar". Village Voice critic Robert Christgau called it a "hidden treasure." Nick DeRiso of Ultimate Classic Rock called it "a choice deep cut." In early 1970 Tampa Tribune reporter Rory O'Connor felt that it had the potential to be the band's "next million seller single" and noted that it was receiving significant airplay on local radio. Music journalist Hank Bordowitz praises Fogerty's "willingness to take a stand on the issues of the day" and for his "prescience" in being one of the first to criticize Reagan in a song.

Creedence Clearwater Revival drummer Doug Clifford claimed that "It's a fun song. It's kind of a spoof on everybody." Clifford also stated that he was surprised it did not become more popular. Bassist Stu Cook called it "a tough act to follow."

"It Came Out of the Sky" was included on several Creedence Clearwater Revival compilation albums, including Chronicle, Vol. 2 in 1986, Keep On Chooglin' in 1999 and Creedence Clearwater Revival: Box Set in 2001. It was released as a single in the UK backed with "Side O the Road" and in Spain backed with "Cotton Fields."

== Live versions ==
Creedence Clearwater Revival sometimes played the song live and it appears on the 1973 live album Live in Europe. Commenting on a 1971 concert, Elwood commented that Cook's bass playing on the song was "imaginative and forceful." After Fogerty left the group and Clifford and Cook formed Creedence Clearwater Revisited, they continued to occasionally play the song live. According to Cook, the band continues to play the song for themselves at soundchecks, even though much of the audience typically fails to recognize it when they include it in the shows.
