= Billy McGinty (cowboy) =

Oklahoman cowboy and Bufflo Bill Rough Rider (1871–1961)

William M. McGinty (January 1, 1871 – May 21, 1961) was an Oklahoman cowboy.

As a cowboy in Kansas and the Indian Territory, he became acquainted with fellow cowboy Bill Doolin and others who would later turn outlaw.

A Rough Rider with Theodore Roosevelt and hero at San Juan Hill, he also toured with Buffalo Bill's Congress of Rough Riders. He was the first bronc buster in a movie, filmed during an act for the 1889 Paris World's Fair.

In the 1920s, he became the leader of the McGinty's Oklahoma Cowboy Band, which later became Otto Gray and his Oklahoma Cowboys, the first nationally famous cowboy band.

He served terms as president of the Cherokee Strip Cowpunchers Association and in 1954 he was elected life-time president of the Rough Riders Association.

In 2000, he was inducted into the Hall of Great Westerners of the National Cowboy & Western Heritage Museum.

== Bibliography ==
- Chlouber, Carla. "Otto Gray and his Oklahoma Cowboys: The Country's First Commercial Western Band". Chronicles of Oklahoma, (Winter, 1997–98) 75:4 356–383.
- Kite, Steve. "Billy McGinty & His Cowboy Band Take to the Air" (transcription). Oklahoma Audio Almanac. Oklahoma State University, May 9, 2001.
- McRill, Leslie A. "Music in Oklahoma by the Billy McGinty Cowboy Band". Chronicles of Oklahoma, (Spring, 1960) 38:1 66–74.
- McRill, Leslie A. "The Story of an Oklahoma Cowboy, William McGinty and His Wife". Chronicles of Oklahoma, (Winter 1956) 34:4 432–442.
- Otto Gray's Oklahoma Cowboys. Early Cowboy Band. British Archive of Country Music, CD D 139, 2006.
- Roosevelt, Theodore. The Rough Riders. Charles Scribner's Sons, 1899.
- Russell, Donald B. The Lives and Legends of Buffalo Bill. University of Oklahoma Press, 1979. ISBN 978-0-8061-1537-5
- Shirley, Glenn. West of Hell's Fringe: Crime, Criminals, and the Federal Peace Officer in Oklahoma Territory, 1889–1907. University of Oklahoma Press, 1990. ISBN 0806122641
- Stewart, Roy P. " 'McGinty Boosted for Cowboy Hall': Country Boy". Daily Oklahoman. June 5, 1956, p. 3.
- Thrapp, Dan L. Encyclopedia of Frontier Biography. University of Nebraska Press, 1991. ISBN 0-8032-9419-0
- Walker, Dale L. Rough Rider: Buckey O'Neill of Arizona. University of Nebraska Press, 1997. ISBN 0-8032-9796-3
