= The Duke of Paducah =

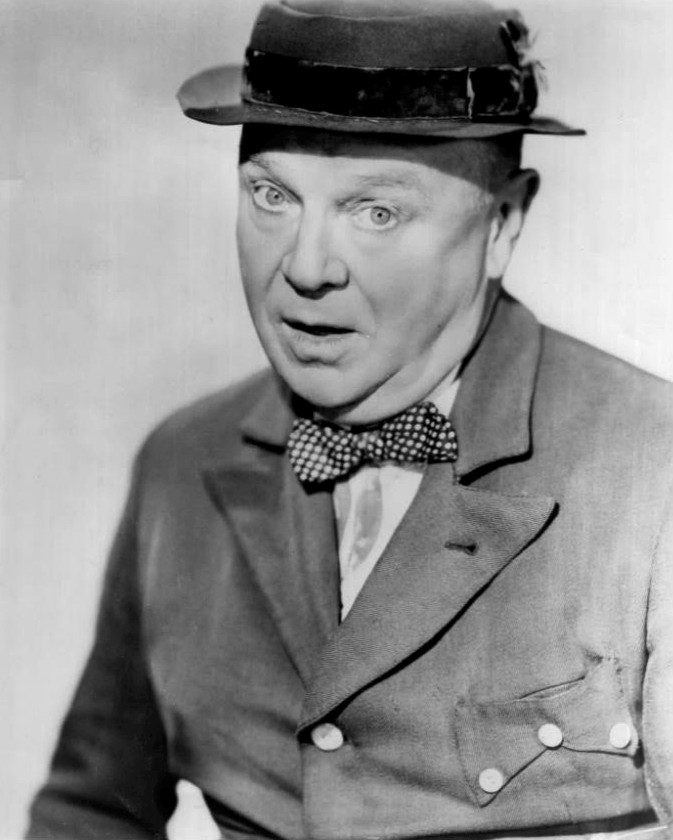

Background information
- Birth name: Benjamin Francis Ford
- Born: May 12, 1901
- Origin: De Soto, Missouri, U.S.
- Died: June 20, 1986 (aged 85); Brentwood, Tennessee, U.S.
- Genres: Country; gospel; rockabilly; boogie; rhythm and blues
- Occupations: Singer-songwriter; musician; radio and TV host; actor
- Instruments: Acoustic guitar; banjo
- Years active: 1930–1968
- Labels: Conqueror; Melotone; Decca
- Formerly of: The Cumberland Valley Boys; The Sunshine Boys; Ernest Tubb; Kitty Wells
- Website: Official website (archived)

Benjamin Francis Ford (May 12, 1901 – June 20, 1986), known professionally as The Duke of Paducah, was an American country comedian, radio host and banjo player popular from the 1940s to the 1960s.

== Early life ==
Ford was born in De Soto, Missouri, and was raised in Little Rock, Arkansas. He had only a third-grade education, so he joked that he came from the "university of hard knocks". He enlisted in the U.S. Navy in 1918. During his Navy service he learned to play the banjo and earned his nickname Whitey Ford because of his blond hair. After his discharge in 1922, he joined McGinty's Oklahoma Cowboy Band, a Dixieland jazz group, as a banjo player. The group later changed its name to Otto Gray and his Oklahoma Cowboys and appeared in a few Hollywood film shorts. In 1929, Ford made his debut on WLS-AM in Chicago, Illinois. A serious man off stage, he lit up on screen.

== Career ==
In the early 1930s, while working at KWK in St. Louis, Ford took the stage name The Duke of Paducah. In 1937, he founded the Renfro Valley Barn Dance with Red Foley and John Lair. More radio work followed when he became a regular on Plantation Party, an NBC Radio show in Cincinnati and Chicago. From 1942–1959, Ford was a regular on the Grand Ole Opry where he became a member. He also hosted several popular radio shows broadcast nationally. In the mid-1950s, Ford toured with a troupe he called the Rock and Roll Revue. On several occasions, he shared a bill with Elvis Presley. In 1958, he began hosting an early morning television show, Country Junction, on WLAC-TV in Nashville, which he hosted for several years, being succeeded by disc jockey Eddie Hill.

Ford ended his act with his tagline: "I'm goin' back to the wagon, boys, these shoes are killin' me." He was elected to the Country Music Hall of Fame in February 1986.
