= The Concert for Valor =

2014 concert in Washington, D.C., U.S.

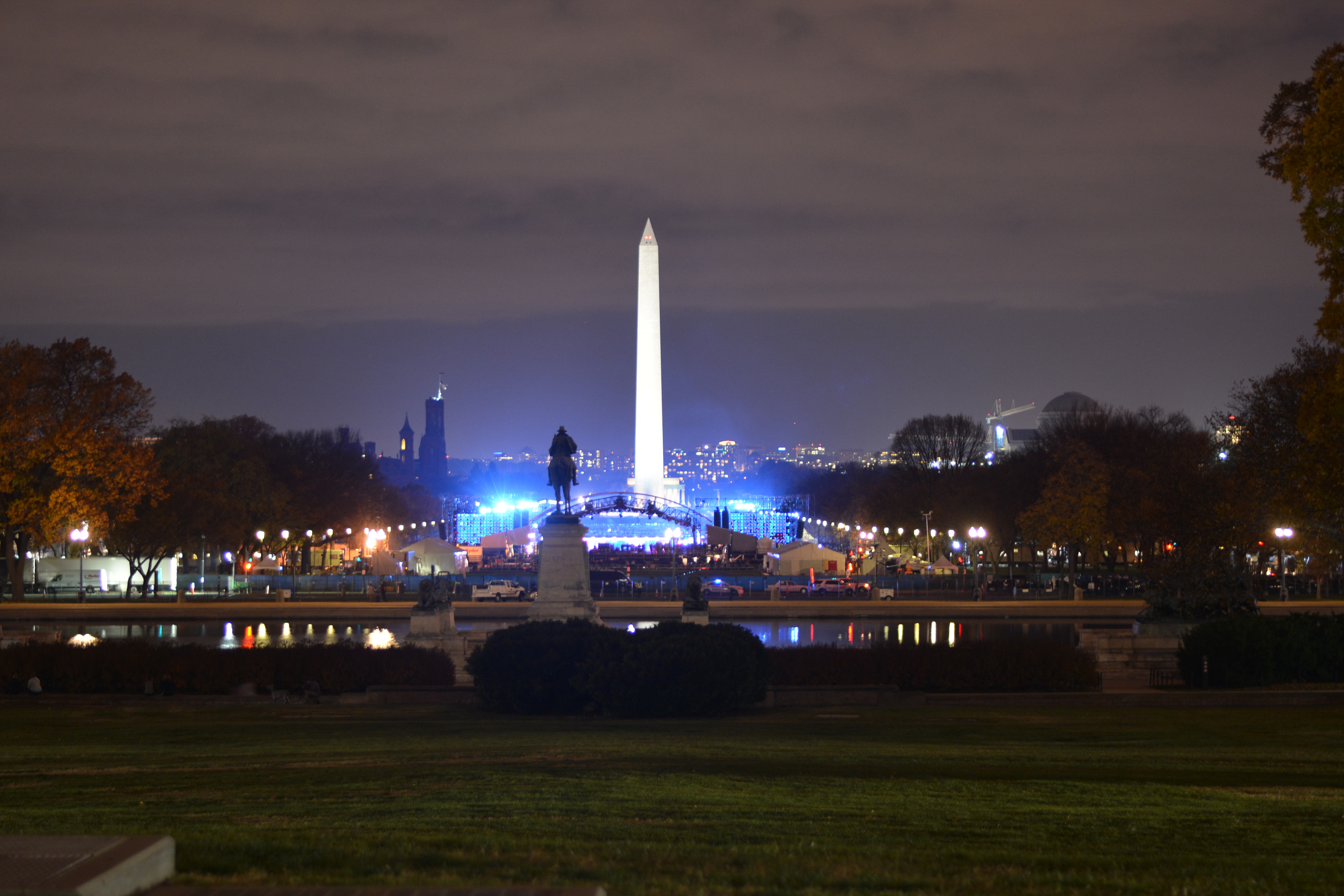
Concert for Valor on the National Mall, November 11, 2014

The Concert for Valor was a Veterans Day concert that took place on November 11, 2014, on the National Mall in Washington, D.C. The concert was arranged by HBO, with Chase, and Starbucks as major sponsors.

Performers included Bruce Springsteen, The Black Keys, Rihanna, Eminem, Zac Brown Band, Jennifer Hudson, Carrie Underwood, Metallica, Dave Grohl, and Jessie J.

The show featured onstage hosts Jack Black, Bryan Cranston, Jamie Foxx, George Lopez, John Oliver, and Bob Woodruff. There were special tributes by Tom Hanks, Will Smith, Steven Spielberg, Meryl Streep, Oprah Winfrey, and Reese Witherspoon.

The Washington Metropolitan Area Transit Authority expected as many as 800,000 attendees to the 2014 event. This estimate was based on a permit filed with the United States Park Police. In actuality, newspapers reported that about 100,000 people attended. A couple of the performances drew questions as to their propriety for the event: one for "Fortunate Son" on its lyrics and one for Eminem on his profanity-laced tribute to Veterans Day.

== Line-up ==
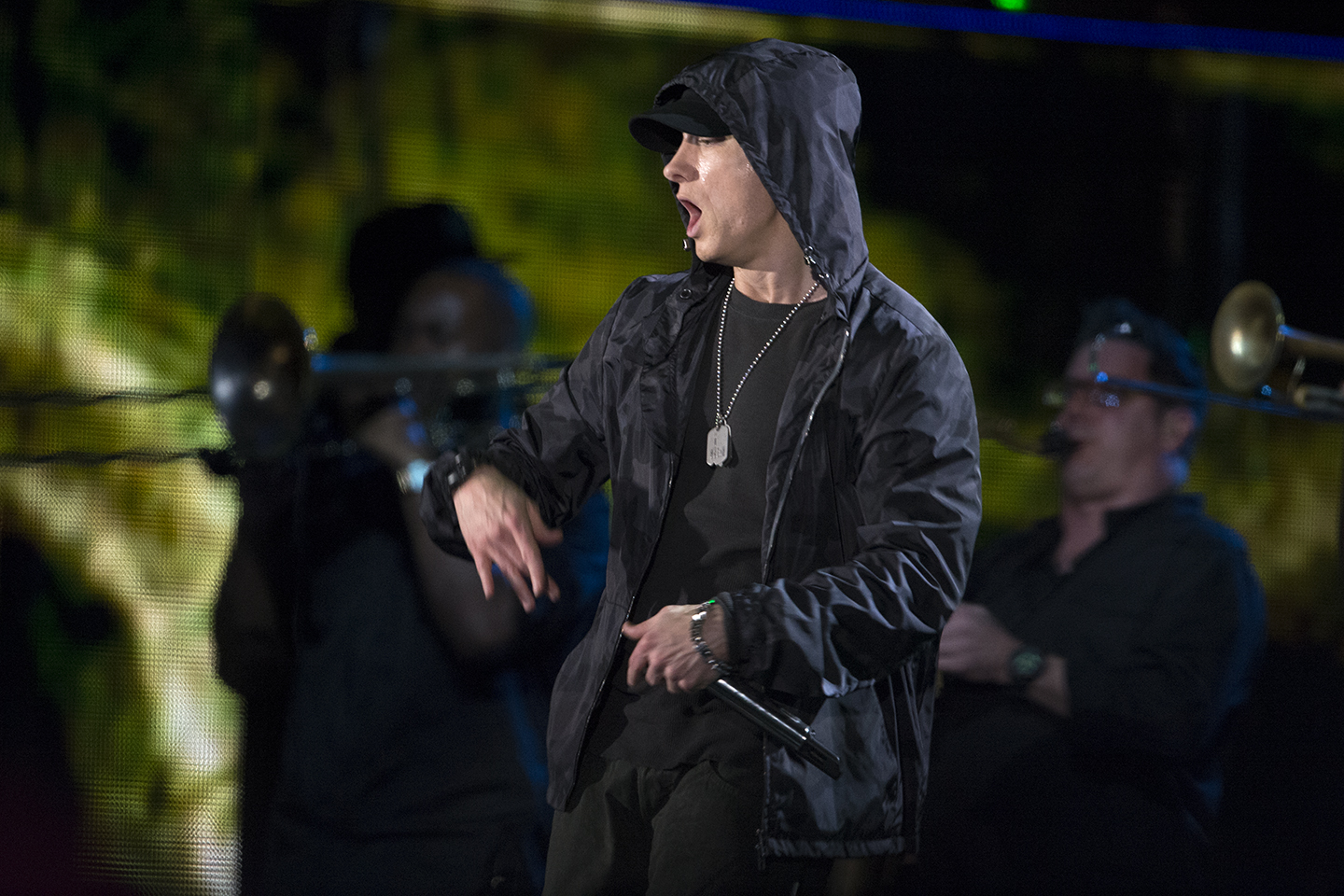
Eminem performing at The Concert for Valor

- Jennifer Hudson – "The Star-Spangled Banner"
- Jessie J with Jennifer Hudson – "Titanium"
- Jessie J – "Bang Bang"
- Dave Grohl – "My Hero"
- Dave Grohl – "Everlong"
- Zac Brown Band – "Free" with snippet of "God Bless the USA"
- Zac Brown Band – "Chicken Fried"
- Zac Brown Band with Dave Grohl and Bruce Springsteen – "Fortunate Son"
- The Black Keys – "Howlin' for You"
- The Black Keys – "Fever"
- The Black Keys – "Lonely Boy"
- Carrie Underwood – "See You Again"
- Carrie Underwood – "Something in the Water" with Singing Sergeants of USAF
- Carrie Underwood – "Before He Cheats"
- Metallica – "For Whom the Bell Tolls"
- Metallica – "Master of Puppets"
- Metallica – "Enter Sandman"
- Bruce Springsteen – "The Promised Land"
- Bruce Springsteen – "Born in the USA"
- Bruce Springsteen – "Dancing in the Dark"
- Rihanna – "Diamonds"
- Rihanna – "Stay"
- Rihanna and Eminem – "The Monster"
- Eminem – "Guts Over Fear"
- Eminem – "Not Afraid"
- Eminem – "Lose Yourself"
