= Down on the Corner =

1969 song by Creedence Clearwater Revival

Single by Creedence Clearwater Revival

from the album Willy and the Poor Boys
- A-side: "Fortunate Son"
- Released: October 1969
- Recorded: 1969
- Genre: Rock and roll; roots rock; swamp rock
- Length: 2:47
- Label: Fantasy
- Songwriter: John Fogerty
- Producer: John Fogerty

Creedence Clearwater Revival singles chronology
"Green River" (1969)	"Down on the Corner" / "Fortunate Son" (1969)	"Travelin' Band" (1969)

"Down on the Corner" is a song by the American band Creedence Clearwater Revival. It was the B-side of the "Fortunate Son" single and appeared on their fourth studio album, Willy and the Poor Boys (1969). The combined single peaked at number three on the US Billboard Hot 100 singles chart on 20 December 1969. (Note: Billboard magazine changed its practice of counting sales and airplay separately for each song beginning with the chart published on 29 November 1969. On 22 November, "Down on the Corner" and "Fortunate Son" were at number 21 and number 14 respectively. On 29 November the combined sides were at number nine, and they peaked at number three for one week on 20 December. Billboard-licensed music historian Joel Whitburn assigns a peak Hot 100 chart position of number three to "Down on the Corner" and number 14 to "Fortunate Son".)

In Canada, the single reached number four in December 1969, and number five in New Zealand. The song performed better in much of Continental Europe, where it made number two in Germany, number nine in Austria, number eight in the Netherlands, number 17 in Flemish-speaking Belgium and number six in French-speaking Belgium than in the United Kingdom, where it stalled at number 31.

== Composition and lyrics ==
The song depicts the fictional band Willy and the Poor Boys, and how they play on street corners to cheer people up and ask for nickels.

Songwriter John Fogerty explained how the lyrics were derived:

[I] was kind of inspired by seeing an advertisement in the paper one day. It was an ad from Disney that said in great big letters 'Winnie the Pooh'. Something in my brain said 'Winnie the Pooh and the Pooh Boys'. Obviously, that was close to 'Willy and the Poor Boys'. As I began to develop this idea it turned into music in that weird mystical, almost uncontrollable way, music comes to songwriters. Winnie the Pooh is still my favorite character who I've shared with my daughter Kelsy since the day she was born, though she's growing out of it. But I'm not.

The song makes reference to a harmonica, washboard, a kazoo, a Kalamazoo guitar, and a gut bass. In a 1969 appearance on The Music Scene, the band performed the song dressed up as "Willy and the Poor Boys". Stu Cook played a gut bass, Doug Clifford the washboard, and Tom Fogerty the Kalamazoo, which mimicked the appearance of the band as they appear on the album cover.

Billboard described the single as having "an infectious calypso beat".

== Certifications ==
Certifications for "Down on the Corner"
Region	Certification	Certified units/sales
New Zealand (RMNZ)	2× Platinum	60,000^{‡}
Spain (Promusicae)	Gold	30,000^{‡}
United Kingdom (BPI)	Silver	200,000^{‡}
United States (RIAA)	2× Platinum	2,000,000^{‡}
^{‡} Sales+streaming figures based on certification alone.

== Jerry Reed version ==
"Down on the Corner"

Single by Jerry Reed

from the album The Bird
- Released: October 4, 1982
- Recorded: 1982
- Genre: Country
- Length: 2:47
- Label: RCA

Jerry Reed singles chronology
""The Bird"" (1982)	"Down on the Corner" (1982)	"Good Ole Boys" (1983)

The song was covered by Jerry Reed for his 1982 album The Bird. The cover reached No. 13 on the US Country chart and No. 11 on the Canadian Country charts.
