= Midnight Special (song) =

1923 traditional American folk song

Song
- Published: 1923
- Genre: Country blues
- Songwriter: Traditional

"Midnight Special" (Roud 6364) is a traditional folk song thought to have originated among prisoners in the American South. The song refers to the passenger train Midnight Special and its "ever-loving light."

The song is historically performed in the country-blues style from the viewpoint of the prisoner and has been performed by many artists.

== History ==
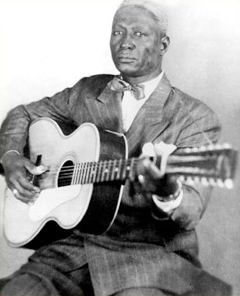
Lead Belly, photographed by Alan Lomax in the 1940s

Lyrics appearing in the song were first recorded in print by Howard Odum in 1905:

Get up in the mornin' when ding dong rings,
Look at table—see the same damn thing

However, these lyrics are known to be floater lines, appearing in various African-American songs of that period, notably in the "Grade-Songs", which are about prison captains and have nothing to do with a train or a light.

The first printed reference to the song itself was in a 1923 issue of Adventure magazine, a three-times-a-month pulp magazine published by the Ridgway Company. In 1927 Carl Sandburg published two different versions of "Midnight Special" in his The American Songbag, the first published versions.

The song was first commercially recorded on the OKeh label in 1926 as "Pistol Pete's Midnight Special" by Dave "Pistol Pete" Cutrell, a member of McGinty's Oklahoma Cow Boy Band. Cutrell follows the traditional song except for semi-comedic stanzas about Billy McGinty and Otto Gray, who took over as bandleader and manager when McGinty left the band, and "a cowboy band":

Now, Mister McGinty is a good man
But he's run away now with a cowboy band
Refrain

Now Otto Gray, he's a Stillwater man
But he's manager now of a cowboy band
Refrain

In March 1929, the band, now Otto Gray and the Oklahoma Cowboys, recorded the song again, this time with the traditional title using only the traditional lyrics.

Sam Collins recorded the song commercially in 1927 under the title "The Midnight Special Blues" for Gennett Records. His version also follows the traditional style. His is the first to name the woman in the story, Little Nora, and he refers to the Midnight Special's "ever-living" light:

Yonder come a Little Nora. How in the world do you know?
I know by the apron and the dress she wears

In 1934, Huddie William "Lead Belly" Ledbetter recorded a version of the song at Angola Prison for John and Alan Lomax, who mistakenly attributed it to him as the author. However, Ledbetter, for his Angola session, appears to have inserted several stanzas relating to a 1923 Houston jailbreak into the traditional song. Ledbetter recorded at least three versions of the song, one with the Golden Gate Quartet, a gospel group (recorded for RCA at Victor Studio #2, New York City, June 15, 1940).

John and Alan Lomax, in their book, Best Loved American Folk Songs, told a credible story identifying the Midnight Special as a train from Houston shining its light into a cell in the Sugar Land Prison. They also describe Ledbetter's version as "the Negro jailbird's ballad to match Hard Times Poor Boy. Like so many American folk songs, its hero is not a man but a train." The light of the train is seen as the light of salvation, the train which could take them away from the prison walls. It is highly reminiscent of the imagery of such gospel songs as "Let the Light from Your Lighthouse Shine on Me". Carl Sandburg had a different view. He believed the subject of the song would rather be run over by a train than spend more time in jail.

Although later versions place the locale of the song near Houston, early versions such as "Walk Right In Belmont" (Wilmer Watts; Frank Wilson, 1927) and "North Carolina Blues" (Roy Martin, 1930)—both essentially the same song as "Midnight Special"—place it in North Carolina. Most of the early versions, however, have no particular location. Only one recording, collected by the Lomaxes at the Mississippi State Penitentiary, actually identifies the railroad operating the Midnight Special—the Illinois Central, which had a route through Mississippi.

== Other versions ==
"Midnight Special"

Song by Creedence Clearwater Revival

from the album Willy and the Poor Boys
- Released: November 2, 1969
- Recorded: 1969
- Studio: Fantasy Studios, Berkeley, California
- Genre: Folk blues; blues rock
- Length: 4:13
- Label: Fantasy
- Songwriter: Traditional
- Producer: John Fogerty

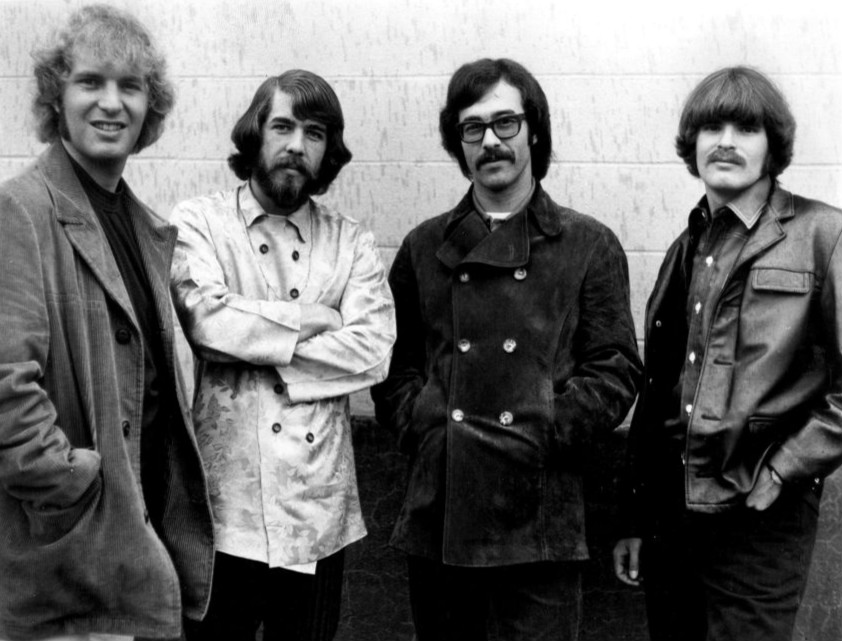
Creedence Clearwater Revival

Creedence Clearwater Revival released the song on their album Willy and the Poor Boys (1969), as part of the band's roots revival efforts to reinvigorate Americana. The album included a cover of "Cotton Fields" for the same purpose.

Country musicians Wilma Lee and Stoney Cooper had a top 5 country hit with their reworking of the song in 1959 as "Big Midnight Special".

Only two versions of the song have reached the US Billboard Hot 100. Paul Evans recorded the highest-charting version of "Midnight Special," reaching number 16 in the winter of 1960. Five years later, Johnny Rivers's version reached number 20 in 1965. The Johnny Rivers version was used as the theme for the NBC music program The Midnight Special.

The song has been recorded by the Kingston Trio (who also recorded their song "The Tijuana Jail", which retains the same music but with new lyrics).

Harry Belafonte's 1962 version is notable for containing the first official recording of Bob Dylan, who played harmonica.

ABBA recorded the song in 1975 for charity, as a part of a folk medley, along with "Pick a Bale of Cotton" and "On Top of Old Smokey". It was the B-side to their 1978 single "Summer Night City". The medley represents the group's only recording of material not written by Benny Andersson and Björn Ulvaeus after their breakthrough with "Ring Ring" in 1973.

The English folk-punk singer Billy Bragg recorded the song with Joe Henry for their 2016 album Shine a Light, also taking the album's title from the song.

=== Certifications ===
Certifications for "Midnight Special" by Creedence Clearwater Revival
Region	Certification	Certified units/sales
New Zealand (RMNZ)	2× Platinum	60,000^{‡}
United States (RIAA)	Gold	500,000^{‡}
^{‡} Sales+streaming figures based on certification alone.

== See also ==
- "Let Your Light Shine on Me", a religious variant of the same song
- List of train songs

== Bibliography ==
- Cohen, Norm. Long Steel Rail: The Railroad in American Folksong. University of Illinois Press (2nd ed), 2000. ISBN 0-252-06881-5
- Oliver, Paul. Songsters and Saints: Vocal Tradition on Race Records. Cambridge University Press, 1984. ISBN 0-521-26942-3
- Collins, "Crying" Sam. "Midnight Special Blues". Jailhouse Blues, 14. Yazoo, CD, 1990.
- Lomax, John A. and Alan Lomax. American Ballads and Folk Songs. Dover Publications (reprint), 1994. ISBN 0-486-28276-7
- Otto Gray's Oklahoma Cowboys. "Pistol Pete's Midnight Special" by Dave Cutrell acc. by McGinty's Oklahoma Cow Boy Band. Early Cowboy Band. British Archive of Country Music, CD D 139, 2006.
- Russell, Tony. Country Music Records: A Discography, 1921–1942. Oxford University Press, 2004. ISBN 0-19-513989-5
- Waltz, Robert B; David G. Engle. "The Midnight Special". The Traditional Ballad Index: An Annotated Bibliography of the Folk Songs of the English-Speaking World. Hosted by California State University, Fresno, Folklore, 2007.
