= Fortunate Son =

1969 single by Creedence Clearwater Revival

- U.S. single sleeve

Single by Creedence Clearwater Revival

from the album Willy and the Poor Boys
- B-side: "Down on the Corner"
- Released: September 1969
- Recorded: 1969
- Studio: Fantasy Studios, Berkeley, California
- Genre: Hard rock; rock and roll; roots rock; blues rock
- Length: 2:18
- Label: Fantasy
- Songwriter: John Fogerty
- Producer: John Fogerty

Creedence Clearwater Revival singles chronology
"Green River" (1969)	"Fortunate Son" (1969)	"Travelin' Band" (1970)

Music video
- "Fortunate Son" on YouTube

"Fortunate Son" is a song by American rock band Creedence Clearwater Revival, written by the group's frontman John Fogerty. It was released as a single with "Down on the Corner" as its B-side in September 1969, and appeared on the band's fourth studio album, Willy and the Poor Boys, released in November 1969.

The song became a Vietnam anti-war movement anthem and an expressive symbol of the counterculture's opposition to executive power grabs, including opposition to the draft and solidarity with the soldiers fighting the Vietnam War. The song has been featured extensively in pop culture depictions of the Vietnam War and the anti-war movement.

== Background ==
The song, released during the peak period of U.S. involvement in the Vietnam War, is critical of the unfairness of the draft:

The thoughts behind this song—it was a lot of anger. So it was the Vietnam War going on. ... Now I was drafted and they're making me fight, and no one has actually defined why. So this was all boiling inside of me and I sat down on the edge of my bed and out came "It ain't me, it ain't me, I ain't no senator's son!" You know, it took about 20 minutes to write the song.

In his autobiography, Fogerty stated that he wrote the song while thinking about David Eisenhower, President Dwight D. Eisenhower's grandson and President Richard Nixon's son-in-law. Eisenhower enlisted in the Navy Reserve in 1970 and served three years active duty, most of it as an officer aboard the USS Albany in the Mediterranean Sea.

"Fortunate Son" wasn't really inspired by any one event. Julie Nixon was dating David Eisenhower. You'd hear about the son of this senator or that congressman who was given a deferment from the military or a choice position in the military. They seemed privileged and whether they liked it or not, these people were symbolic in the sense that they weren't being touched by what their parents were doing. They weren't being affected like the rest of us.

== Reception ==
"Fortunate Son" reached number 14 on the United States charts on November 22, 1969, the week before Billboard changed its methodology on double-sided hits. That week, "Fortunate Son" and its flipside "Down on the Corner" were at number 14 and number 21 respectively on Billboard's Hot 100 singles chart. The tracks combined to climb to number nine the next week, on the way to peaking at number three on December 20, 1969. Billboard-licensed music historian Joel Whitburn assigns a peak Hot 100 chart position of number 14 to "Fortunate Son" and number three to "Down on the Corner".

Billboard said "Fortunate Son" has "the feel and flavor" of the band's previous hit single, "Green River." Upon the single release, Record World felt that it could be Creedence Clearwater Revival's biggest hit to date. It was certified Gold by the RIAA in December 1970.

== Legacy ==
Pitchfork Media placed it at number 17 on its list of "The 200 Greatest Songs of the 1960s". Rolling Stone placed it at number 99 on its "500 Greatest Songs of All Time" list in 2004 and 2010; it was moved down to number 227 in the 2020 edition. In 2013, the song was added to the National Recording Registry by the Library of Congress for being "culturally, historically, or aesthetically significant." In 2025, Rolling Stone ranked the song at number 13 on its list of "The 100 Best Protest Songs of All Time." In June 2026, CBS News included the song in its list of the 250 essential American songs of the past 250 years.

Ultimate Classic Rock critic Bryan Wawzenek rated the lyrics of "Fortunate Son" as Fogerty's greatest, saying, "It's not just Fogerty's emotion, but the words that make this song great. 'Star-spangled eyes' is one of the best descriptive phrases in all of rock and roll, a uniquely American twist on rose-colored glasses."

== Johnny Hallyday version ==
"Fils de personne"

Single by Johnny Hallyday

from the album Flagrant Délit
- Language: French
- English title: Son of no one
- B-side: "Il faut boire à la source"
- Released: September 22, 1971
- Recorded: 1970
- Studio: Olympic Studios, London
- Genre: Rock
- Length: 2:48
- Label: Philips
- Songwriters: John Fogerty, Philippe Labro
- Producer: Lee Hallyday

Johnny Hallyday singles chronology
"Oh! Ma jolie Sarah" (1971)	"Fils de personne" (1971)	"Comme si je devais mourir demain" (1972)

Music video
- "Fils de personne" (French TV, 1971) on YouTube

In September 1971, a French adaptation (titled "Fils de personne", meaning "Son of nobody") was released by French rock singer Johnny Hallyday. "Fils de personne" was released as the second and final single off of Hallyday's 1971 studio album Flagrant Délit, released three months prior. The song peaked at No. 4 in the French charts. The single was backed by "Il faut boire à la source".

Philippe Labro's lyrics state the narrator doesn't have a military, billionaire, or civil servant father, and that he owes his success to no one. Journalist Jean-William Thoury wrote that the adaptation does not betray the original song idea "which seems to suit Johnny so well, a real "son of no one".

=== Charts ===
Chart (1971)	Peak position
France (SNEP)	4

== Other uses and performances ==
Fogerty recorded a version of "Fortunate Son" with Foo Fighters for his 2013 album Wrote a Song for Everyone.

Bruce Springsteen, Dave Grohl, and Zac Brown attracted criticism when they performed the song together at the November 2014 Concert for Valor in Washington D.C. Fogerty, a military veteran, defended their song choice.

The song was played at a 2020 campaign rally for Donald Trump, which Fogerty found to be "confounding" and later issued a cease and desist order, noting that Trump obtained a draft deferment.

The song was performed by the U.S. Army band Downrange during the United States Army 250th Anniversary Parade on June 14, 2025, drawing criticism and leading to speculation that it was performed in protest at Donald Trump, who arranged for the parade to coincide with his birthday, despite never performing active military service.

"Fortunate Son" was used in a Wrangler jeans commercial in 2002, to Fogerty's chagrin:

Yes, the people that owned Fantasy Records also owned all my early songs, and they would do all kinds of stuff I really hated in a commercial way with my songs. ... Then one day somebody from the L.A. Times actually bothered to call me up and ask me how I felt, and I finally had a chance to talk about it. And I said I'm very much against my song being used to sell pants. ... So my position got stated very well in the newspaper, and lo and behold, Wrangler to their credit said, "Wow, even though we made our agreement with the publisher, the owner of the song, we can see now that John Fogerty really hates the idea", so they stopped doing it.

== Charts ==
=== Weekly charts ===
Chart (1969–2026)	Peak position
Belgium (Ultratop 50 Flanders)	12
Belgium (Ultratop 50 Wallonia)	6
Canada Digital Song Sales (Billboard)	37
France (SNEP)	144
Global 200 (Billboard)	159
US Billboard Hot 100	3
US Hot Rock & Alternative Songs (Billboard)	20

=== Year-end charts ===
Chart (1970)	Position
Belgium (Ultratop Flanders)	93

=== Decade-end charts ===
20s Decade-end chart performance
Chart (2025–2026)	Position
Russia Streaming (TopHit)	174

== Certifications ==
Region	Certification	Certified units/sales
Brazil (Pro-Música Brasil)	Gold	30,000^{‡}
Denmark (IFPI Danmark)	Platinum	90,000^{‡}
Germany (BVMI)	Gold	250,000^{‡}
Italy (FIMI)	Platinum	70,000^{‡}
New Zealand (RMNZ)	5× Platinum	150,000^{‡}
Spain (Promusicae)	2× Platinum	120,000^{‡}
United Kingdom (BPI)	2× Platinum	1,200,000^{‡}
United States (RIAA)	8× Platinum	8,000,000^{‡}
^{‡} Sales+streaming figures based on certification alone.

== See also ==
- List of anti-war songs
- List of best-selling singles
- List of songs about the Cold War
