= Creedence Clearwater Revival discography =

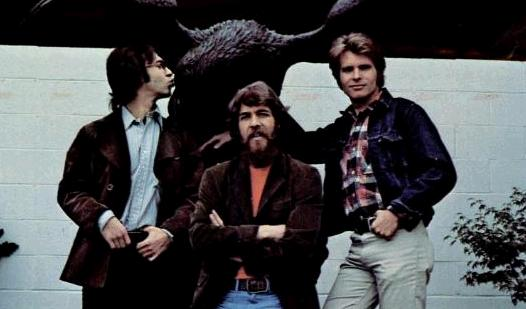
- Creedence Clearwater Revival in 1971
- Studio albums: 7
- Live albums: 5
- Compilation albums: 45
- Singles: 29
- B-sides: 14

The discography of American rock band Creedence Clearwater Revival, who released their first album and singles in July 1968, includes 7 studio albums, 5 live albums, 43 compilation albums, and 29 singles. The group, although only active for 4 years, has sold more than 45 million albums and singles in the United States alone, and has charted in multiple countries throughout the world.

Creedence Clearwater Revival never had a Billboard No. 1 hit in the United States. Five of their singles peaked at No. 2. They have the dubious distinction to have the most singles reach the top 10 (nine of them) without ever hitting number 1.

== Albums ==
=== Studio albums ===
List of albums, with selected chart positions
Title	Album details	Peak chart positions										Certifications
Title	Album details	US	AUS	CAN	FIN	GER	ITA	JPN	NL	NOR	UK	Certifications
Creedence Clearwater Revival	Released: July 5, 1968; Label: Fantasy (8382); Format: stereo LP	52	—	—	—	—	—	92	—	29	—	RIAA: Platinum
Bayou Country	Released: January 15, 1969; Label: Fantasy (8387); Format: stereo LP	7	—	14	—	33	—	93	—	—	62	RIAA: 2× Platinum
Green River	Released: August 7, 1969; Label: Fantasy (8393); Format: stereo LP	1	—	2	11	11	16	46	—	5	20	RIAA: 3× Platinum; RMNZ: Gold
Willy and the Poor Boys	Released: October 29, 1969; Label: Fantasy (8397); Format: stereo LP	3	2	2	3	25	17	11	3	2	10	RIAA: 2× Platinum; RMNZ: 2× Platinum
Cosmo's Factory	Released: July 8, 1970; Label: Fantasy (8402); Format: stereo LP	1	1	1	1	4	2	10	2	1	1	RIAA: 4× Platinum; ARIA: Platinum; BPI: Gold; IFPI FIN: Gold; RMNZ: Platinum
Pendulum	Released: December 9, 1970; Label: Fantasy (8410); Format: stereo LP	5	1	2	1	3	3	2	2	1	8	RIAA: Platinum; IFPI FIN: Gold
Mardi Gras	Released: April 11, 1972; Label: Fantasy (9404); Format: stereo LP	12	8	11	2	10	4	3	2	5	—	RIAA: Gold
"—" denotes a recording that did not chart or was not released in that territory.

=== Live albums ===
List of live albums, with selected chart positions
Title	Album details	Peak chart positions		Certifications
Title	Album details	US	AUS	Certifications
Live in Europe	Released: October 16, 1973; Recorded: September 4–28, 1971; Label: Fantasy (CCR-1); Format: stereo LP	143	72	
The Concert	Released: December 1980; Recorded: January 31, 1970; Label: Fantasy (4501); Format: stereo LP	62	—	RIAA: Platinum
Recollection	Released: June 2, 1998; Recorded: November 1997; Label: CBH Records; Formats: 2CD, 3LP	—	—	
Live at Woodstock	Released: August 2, 2019; Recorded: August 17, 1969; Label: Fantasy (7096); Formats: CD, stereo LP, digital download	—	—	
At the Royal Albert Hall	Released: September 16, 2022; Recorded: April 14, 1970; Label: Craft, Fantasy; Formats: CD, stereo LP, digital download	192	73	

=== Compilation albums ===
Title	Album details	Peak chart positions										Certifications
Title	Album details	US	CAN	AUS	FIN	GER	JPN	NL	NOR	SWE	UK	Certifications
Spirit Orgaszmus	Side A: Creedence Clearwater Revival; Side B: Jeronimo; Released: 1970; Label: Bellaphon (BI 1527); Format: LP	—	—	—	—	6	—	—	—	—	—	
Creedence Gold	Released: 1972; Label: Fantasy (F-9418); Format: LP, 8-track	15	9	9	—	—	14	7	—	—	—	RIAA: 2× Platinum
More Creedence Gold	Released: 1973; Label: Fantasy (F-9430); Format: LP	61	49	41	—	—	28	9	—	—	—	RIAA: Gold
20 Super Hits	Released: 1973; Label: Fantasy/Bellaphon (BS 45004); Format: LP	—	—	—	—	42	—	—	—	—	—	
Chronicle: The 20 Greatest Hits	Released: 1976; Label: Fantasy (CCR-2); Format: LP, CD	18	—	16	—	50	—	70	40	59	35	RIAA: 12× Platinum; BPI: Gold; MC: Gold; ARIA: 6× Platinum; RMNZ: Platinum
Hot Stuff	Released: 1976; Label: Fantasy (53301); Format: LP	—	—	—	—	—	—	—	—	—	—	RIAA: Gold
The Best of Creedence Clearwater Revival	Released: 1977; Label: K-tel; Format: LP	—	—	—	—	10	—	—	—	—	—	
20 Golden Greats	Released: 1979; Label: Fantasy; Format: LP	—	—	1	—	—	—	—	—	—	—	AUS: Platinum
Best of Creedence Clearwater Revival	Released: 1980; Label: K-tel; Format: LP	—	—	—	5	—	—	—	—	—	—	
Hey Tonight	Released: 1981; Label: Metronome (0061.138); Format: LP	—	—	—	—	1	—	—	—	—	—	
The Very Best of Creedence Clearwater Revival	Released: 1981; Label: K-Tel; Format: LP	—	—	—	—	—	—	—	—	—	—	
Creedence Country	Released: 1981; Label: Fantasy; Format: LP	—	—	—	—	—	—	—	—	—	—	
Hits Album	Released: 1982; Label: Fantasy; Format:	—	—	—	—	—	—	—	—	—	—	
Chooglin'	Released: 1982; Label: Fantasy (F-9621); Format: LP	—	—	—	—	—	—	—	—	—	—	
Creedence Clearwater Revival	Released: 1983; Label: Amiga (STEREO 8 56 008); Format: LP	—	—	—	—	—	—	—	—	—	—	
At the Movies	Released: 1985; Label: Fantasy; Format: LP, Cassette	—	—	—	—	—	—	—	—	—	—	
The Complete Hit-Album	Released: 1985; Label: Arcade (01 2790 22); Format: LP, CD	—	—	—	—	—	—	22	—	—	—	
Chronicle: Volume Two	Released: 1986; Label: Fantasy (CCR-3); Format: LP, CD	—	—	—	—	—	—	70	—	—	—	
Rollin' on the River	Released: 1988; Label: Fantasy (53302); Format: LP	—	—	—	—	—	—	—	—	—	—	RIAA: Gold
21st Anniversary: The Ultimate Collection (24 Classic Hits)	Released: 1989; Label: Fantasy (93335); Format: LP	—	—	3	—	—	—	—	—	—	—	ARIA: 7× Platinum
All Time Hits	Released: 1990; Label: Euros (SIN 1060); Format: LP	—	—	—	22	—	—	—	—	—	—	IFPI FIN: Gold
More Hits	Released: 1991; Label: Euros; Format: LP	—	—	—	29	—	—	—	—	—	—	
Heartland Music Presents Creedence Clearwater Revival	Released: 1992; Label: Heartland Music; Format: CD, cassette	—	—	—	—	—	—	—	—	—	—	
The Best of CCR	Released: 1993; Label: Polydor (740 002-2/4); Format: CD	—	13	—	—	—	—	—	—	—	—	MC: 2× Platinum
Really the Best	Released: 1994; Label: ZYX (55017-2); Format: CD	—	—	—	—	43	—	58	—	—	—	
CCR Forever – 36 Greatest Hits	Released: 1994; Label: Amigo (CC-8200); Format: CD	—	—	—	10	—	—	1	20	—	—	
Keep on Chooglin'	Released: 1995; Label: Fantasy (TVD98013); Format: CD	—	—	13	—	—	—	—	—	—	—	
The Ultimate Collection	Released: 1997; Label: Fantasy; Format: CD	—	—	11	—	—	—	—	—	—	—	
All Time Greatest Hits	Released: 1998; Label: ZYX (81157-2); Format: CD	—	—	—	—	—	—	38	—	—	—	
The Very Best of Creedence Clearwater Revival	Released: 1999; Label: Fantasy/EastWest (3984 26711 2); Format: CD	—	—	—	—	—	—	—	—	—	—	
At the Movies (Reissue)	Released: 2000; Label: Fantasy (4539); Format: CD	—	—	—	—	—	—	—	—	—	—	
Platinum	Released: 2001; Label: Amigo (CCR 40); Format: CD	—	—	—	10	—	—	—	2	3	—	IFPI FIN: Platinum
Creedence Clearwater Revival: Box Set	Released: October 2, 2001; Label: Fantasy (4434); Format: CD	—	—	—	—	—	—	—	—	—	—	
Bad Moon Rising: The Best of Creedence Clearwater Revival	Released: 2003; Label: Fantasy; Format: CD	—	—	—	—	—	—	—	—	—	—	
Scandinavian Collection	Released: 2005; Label: Amigo; Format: CD	—	—	—	—	—	—	—	—	15	—	
Best Of	Released: 2008; Label: Fantasy (30870-02); Format: CD	—	—	36	40	—	—	24	3	2	46	ARIA: Platinum; BPI: Platinum; RMNZ: 2× Platinum
Collected	Released: 2008; Label: Universal (531 096-4); Format: CD	—	—	—	—	—	—	1	—	—	—	
Creedence Clearwater Revival – 40th Anniversary Editions Box Set	Released: 2009; Label: Fantasy; Format: CD	—	—	—	41	—	—	—	—	—	—	
Creedence Clearwater Revival Cover the Classics	Released: 2009; Label: Fantasy (0888072314221); Format: CD	—	—	—	—	—	—	—	—	—	—	
The Singles Collection	Released: 2009; Label: Fantasy (31752); Format: CD	—	—	—	—	—	—	—	—	—	—	
Ultimate Creedence Clearwater Revival: Greatest Hits & All-Time Classics	Released: 2012; Label: Fantasy; Format: 3CD	—	—	—	—	—	—	—	—	—	—	
The Ultimate Collection	Released: 2012 (Australia); Label: Fantasy; Format: 2CD	—	—	10	—	—	—	—	—	—	—	ARIA: Platinum
Bad Moon Rising: The Collection	Released: 2013; Label: Fantasy; Format: CD, LP	—	—	—	—	—	—	18	—	—	—	BPI: Gold
Greatest Hits	Released: 2014; Label: Fantasy; Format: CD, LP	25	—	—	—	—	—	—	—	—	—	
"—" denotes releases that did not chart.

== Singles ==
Title	Year	Chart positions										Certifications	Album	Genre
Title	Year	US	US Cash	AUS	CAN	FIN	GER	NL	NOR	SWE	UK	Certifications	Album	Genre
"Porterville"	1968	—	—	—	—	—	—	—	—	—	—		Creedence Clearwater Revival	
"Suzie Q"	1968	11	9	88	10	—	—	—	—	—	—	RIAA: Platinum; RMNZ: Gold	Creedence Clearwater Revival	
"I Put a Spell on You"	1968	58	65	—	72	—	—	—	—	—	—	RIAA: Gold	Creedence Clearwater Revival	Blues Rock, Swamp Rock, Roots Rock y Psychedelic Rock
"Proud Mary"	1969	2	2	5	2	—	4	8	6	13	8	RIAA: 2× Platinum; BPI: Silver; RMNZ: 2× Platinum	Bayou Country	Swamp Rock, Roots Rock y Rock and Roll
"Born on the Bayou"	1969	—	—	—	—	—	—	—	—	—	—	RIAA: Platinum; RMNZ: Gold	Bayou Country	Swamp Rock, Roots Rock y Blue-Eyed Soul
"Bad Moon Rising"	1969	2	2	3	5	19	8	10	3	3	1	RIAA: 2× Platinum; BPI: Platinum; RMNZ: 5× Platinum	Green River	Swamp Rock, Roots Rock, Rockabilly & Blues Rock
"Lodi"	1969	52	58	—	59	—	—	—	—	—	—	RIAA: Gold; RMNZ: Gold	Green River	
"Green River"	1969	2	3	6	5	34	8	—	—	10	19	RIAA: Platinum; RMNZ: Platinum	Green River	
"Commotion"	1969	30	40	—	—	—	—	12	—	—	—		Green River	
"Down on the Corner"	1969	3 (Note: In the US, "Fortunate Son" and "Down on the Corner" were released as a and b sides on one single. Billboard magazine changed its practice of counting sales and airplay separately for each song beginning with the chart published on 29 November 1969. On 22 November, "Fortunate Son" and "Down on the Corner" were at number 14 and number 21 respectively. On 29 November the combined sides were at number 9, and they peaked at number three for one week on 20 December. Billboard-licensed music historian Joel Whitburn assigns a peak Hot 100 chart position of number 14 to "Fortunate Son" and number three to "Down on the Corner".)	10	2	4	28	2	8	—	—	31	RIAA: 2× Platinum; BPI: Silver; RMNZ: 2× Platinum	Willy and the Poor Boys	
"Fortunate Son"	1969	14	6	2	4	28	10	—	—	—	—	RIAA: 8× Platinum; BPI: 2× Platinum; RMNZ: 6× Platinum	Willy and the Poor Boys	
"Travelin' Band"	1970	2	5	2	4	8	4	1	4	4	8	RIAA: Gold	Cosmo's Factory	
"Who'll Stop the Rain"	1970	2	13	2	4	8	4	1	—	—	—	RIAA: Platinum; RMNZ: Platinum	Cosmo's Factory	
"Up Around the Bend"	1970	4	2	1	1	8	2	1	2	—	3	RIAA: 2× Platinum; BPI: Silver; RMNZ: Platinum	Cosmo's Factory	
"Run Through the Jungle"	1970	4	48	—	1	8	—	—	—	—		RMNZ: Platinum	Cosmo's Factory	
"Lookin' Out My Back Door"	1970	2	1	1	1	16	2	—	1	2	—	RIAA: 2× Platinum; RMNZ: Platinum	Cosmo's Factory	
"Long As I Can See the Light"	1970	2	57	1	1	16	2	5	—	20	20	RIAA: Gold; RMNZ: Platinum	Cosmo's Factory	
"Have You Ever Seen the Rain"	1971	8	3	6	1	13	—	3	2	8	36	RIAA: 8× Platinum; ARIA: 8× Platinum; BPI: Platinum; RMNZ: Diamond	Pendulum	
"Hey Tonight"	1971	8	—	9	1	13	—	—	—	—			Pendulum	
"Sweet Hitch-Hiker"	1971	6	5	12	1	8	6	5	4	9	36	RIAA: Gold	Mardi Gras	
"Someday Never Comes"	1972	25	25	15	29	—	29	12	—	—	—		Mardi Gras	
"Born on the Bayou" [re-release]	1972	—	—	—	—	—	15	—	—	—	—		Bayou Country	
"I Put a Spell on You" [re-release]	1972	—	—	—	—	—	—	3	—	—	—		Creedence Clearwater Revival	
"Molina"	1972	—	—	—	—	—	32	—	—	—	—		Pendulum	
"I Heard It Through the Grapevine"	1973	—	—	—	—	—	—	10	—	—	—		Cosmo's Factory	
"I Heard It Through the Grapevine" [re-release]	1976	43	47	—	76	—	—	—	—	—	—		Cosmo's Factory	
"Tombstone Shadow" (Live) b/w "Commotion" (Live)	1980	—	—	—	—	—	—	—	—	—	—		The Concert	
"Medley U.S.A." b/w "Bad Moon Rising" (from Green River)	1981	—	—	—	—	—	—	—	—	—	—		non-album single	
"Cotton Fields"	1982	—		—	—	—	—	—	—	—	—	RMNZ: Gold	Creedence Country	
"Long as I Can See the Light" [re-release]	1990	—		—	—	—	—	64	—	—	—		The Complete Hit-Album	
"I Put a Spell on You" [re-release]	1990	—		—	—	—	—	64	—	—	—		The Complete Hit-Album	
"—" denotes releases that did not chart.

=== Other certified songs ===
Title	Year	Certifications	Album
"Midnight Special"	1969	RIAA: Gold; RMNZ: 2× Platinum	Willy and the Poor Boys

== Music videos ==
Title	Year
"Bad Moon Rising"	1969
"I Put a Spell on You"	1969
"Bootleg"	1969
"Lookin' Out My Backdoor"	1970
"I Heard It Through the Grapevine"	1970
"Have You Ever Seen the Rain"	1971
"Sweet Hitch-Hiker"	1972

== See also ==
- The Golliwogs discography
- John Fogerty discography
- Tom Fogerty discography
- Cosmo
