= Ultimate Creedence Clearwater Revival: Greatest Hits & All-Time Classics =

Greatest hits album by Creedence Clearwater Revival
- Released: November 6, 2012
- Recorded: 1968–1972
- Genres: Southern rock; rock and roll; swamp rock; country rock
- Length: 191:41
- Labels: Fantasy; Concord
- Producer: Nick Phillips

Creedence Clearwater Revival chronology
The Singles Collection (2009)	Ultimate Creedence Clearwater Revival: Greatest Hits & All-Time Classics (2012)	Bad Moon Rising: The Collection (2013)

Ultimate Creedence Clearwater Revival: Greatest Hits & All-Time Classics is a three-disc greatest hits album by American rock band Creedence Clearwater Revival, released in 2012 by Fantasy Records and Concord Music Group.

The first two discs contain the studio recordings of many of the band's most well-known songs, such as "Fortunate Son", "Down on the Corner", "Run Through the Jungle" and "Green River", while the third disc consists entirely of live performances, mostly from 1971 concerts in Europe.

Almost every track on discs 1 and 2 were included on the previous hits albums Chronicle: The 20 Greatest Hits and Chronicle: Volume Two. "Porterville" was included to even out the tracklisting due to the inclusion of the album version of "Susie Q", rather than splitting it into two parts like on the single and the Chronicle albums.

== Reception ==
Professional ratings
Review scores
Source	Rating
AllMusic	4/5 stars
American Songwriter	4/5 stars

Stephen Thomas Erlewine of AllMusic mostly praised the collection, but felt the third disc of live recordings was "extraneous" and "nothing to return to frequently". AllMusic gave the collection 4 out of 5 stars. Joe Marchese of The Second Disc reviewed it and called it a "potent sampler of that hoodoo that they did so well."

== Track listing ==
All tracks written by John Fogerty unless otherwise stated.

=== Disc 1 ===
1. "Proud Mary" (from Bayou Country, 1969) – 3:08
2. "Born on the Bayou" (from Bayou Country, 1969) – 5:16
3. "Bad Moon Rising" (from Green River, 1969) – 2:21
4. "Good Golly, Miss Molly" (from Bayou Country, 1969) (John Marascalco, Robert "Bumps" Blackwell) – 2:42
5. "Up Around the Bend" (from Cosmo's Factory, 1970) – 2:42
6. "Suzie-Q" (from Creedence Clearwater Revival, 1968) (Dale Hawkins, Robert Chaisson, Stan Lewis, Eleanor Broadwater) – 8:37
7. "Fortunate Son" (from Willy and the Poor Boys, 1969) – 2:19
8. "The Midnight Special" (from Willy and the Poor Boys, 1969) (Traditional) – 4:13
9. "Who'll Stop the Rain" (from Cosmo's Factory, 1970) – 2:28
10. "Run Through the Jungle" (from Cosmo's Factory, 1970) – 3:05
11. "Hey Tonight" (from Pendulum, 1970) – 2:43
12. "Wrote a Song for Everyone" (from Green River, 1969) – 4:55
13. "Sweet Hitch-Hiker" (from Mardi Gras, 1972) – 2:59
14. "Before You Accuse Me" (from Cosmo's Factory, 1970) (Bo Diddley) – 3:27
15. "Commotion" (from Green River, 1969) – 2:44
16. "My Baby Left Me" (from Cosmo's Factory, 1970) (Arthur "Big Boy" Crudup) – 2:19
17. "Bootleg" (from Bayou Country, 1969) – 3:02
18. "Pagan Baby" (from Pendulum, 1970) – 6:24
19. "(Wish I Could) Hideaway" (from Pendulum, 1970) – 3:43
20. "Cotton Fields" (from Willy and the Poor Boys, 1969) (Lead Belly) – 2:56

=== Disc 2 ===
1. "Travelin' Band" (from Cosmo's Factory, 1970) – 2:08
2. "Don't Look Now (It Ain't You or Me)" (from Willy and the Poor Boys, 1969) – 2:10
3. "Down on the Corner" (from Willy and the Poor Boys, 1969) – 2:46
4. "It Came Out of the Sky" (from Willy and the Poor Boys, 1969) – 2:33
5. "Lookin' Out My Back Door" (from Cosmo's Factory, 1970) – 2:33
6. "Born to Move" (from Pendulum, 1970) – 5:41
7. "Green River" (from Green River, 1969) – 2:34
8. "I Put a Spell on You" (from Creedence Clearwater Revival, 1968) (Screamin' Jay Hawkins, Herb Slotkin) – 4:32
9. "Have You Ever Seen the Rain" (from Pendulum, 1970) – 2:40
10. "Molina" (from Pendulum, 1970) – 2:44
11. "Long As I Can See the Light" (from Cosmo's Factory, 1970) – 3:31
12. "Hello Mary Lou" (from Mardi Gras, 1972) (Gene Pitney, Cayet Mangiaracina) – 2:13
13. "Tombstone Shadow" (from Green River, 1969) – 3:39
14. "Lodi" (from Green River, 1969) – 3:13
15. "Walking on the Water" (from Creedence Clearwater Revival, 1968) – 4:39
16. "The Night Time Is the Right Time" (from Green River, 1969) (Nappy Brown) – 3:08
17. "Someday Never Comes" (from Mardi Gras, 1972) – 3:59
18. "Porterville" (from Creedence Clearwater Revival, 1968) – 2:22
19. "Lookin' for a Reason" (from Mardi Gras, 1972) – 3:25
20. "I Heard It Through the Grapevine" (from Cosmo's Factory, 1970) (Norman Whitfield, Barrett Strong) – 11:03

=== Disc 3 (live disc) ===
1. "Travelin' Band" (live in Oakland; January 31, 1970) – 2:07
2. "Proud Mary" (live in Stockholm; September 21, 1971) – 2:50
3. "Born on the Bayou" (live in London; September 28, 1971) – 4:46
4. "Bad Moon Rising" (live in Berlin; September 16, 1971) – 2:06
5. "Fortunate Son" (live in Manchester; September 1, 1971) – 2:13
6. "Hey Tonight" (live in Hamburg; September 17, 1971) – 2:30
7. "Up Around the Bend" (live in Amsterdam; September 10, 1971) – 2:42
8. "Lodi" (live in Hamburg; September 17, 1971) – 3:20
9. "Down on the Corner" (live in Oakland; January 31, 1970) – 2:45
10. "Who'll Stop the Rain?" (live in Oakland; January 31, 1970) – 2:27
11. "Suzie-Q" (live in San Francisco; March 14, 1969) (Dale Hawkins, Robert Chaisson, Stan Lewis, Eleanor Broadwater) – 11:46
12. "Keep On Chooglin'" (live in Oakland; January 31, 1970) – 9:12

== Personnel ==
- John Fogerty – lead guitar, vocals, tambourine, harmonica, horns, Hammond B3 organ
- Tom Fogerty – rhythm guitar, background vocals
- Stu Cook – bass guitar, background vocals
- Doug Clifford – drums, background vocals

== Charts ==
Chart (2013)	Peak position
Belgian Albums (Ultratop Flanders)	189

Chart (2024)	Peak position
Greek Albums (IFPI)	1
