= The Singles Collection (Creedence Clearwater Revival album) =

Compilation album by Creedence Clearwater Revival
- Released: November 3, 2009
- Genre: Swamp rock
- Length: 1:35:30
- Label: Fantasy
- Producer: John Fogerty; Saul Zaentz (Creedence Clearwater Revival tracks); Stu Cook and Doug Clifford (Mardi Gras tracks)

Creedence Clearwater Revival chronology
Creedence Clearwater Revival Covers the Classics (2009)	The Singles Collection (2009)	Ultimate Creedence Clearwater Revival: Greatest Hits & All-Time Classics (2012)

The Singles Collection is a compilation of singles by the American rock band Creedence Clearwater Revival, released on November 3, 2009, by Fantasy Records. The album contains a third disc with four music videos for "I Heard it Through the Grapevine", "Bootleg", "I Put a Spell on You" and "Lookin' out My Back Door".

== Reception ==
Professional ratings
Review scores
Source	Rating
AllMusic	4/5 stars
PopMatters	7/10
Ultimate Guitar	7.3/10
Under the Radar	6/10 stars

Writing for AllMusic, critic Stephen Thomas Erlewine wrote it does "something that the many other previous Creedence Clearwater Revival compilations do not: the band's A-sides and B-sides presented complete and in chronological order", noting that "This focus means there are songs here that never make most CCR hits collections", he concluded by noting that "this covers familiar, albeit still enjoyable, territory."

Writing for PopMatters, Richard Elliott wrote that "On first impression, a collection of all the singles released by Creedence Clearwater Revival makes perfect sense, given the group’s continued reputation as one of the great singles bands", he notes that "The span of The Singles Collection exceeds the landmark recordings mentioned above", concluding by saying that "while the (smallish) fold-out wall chart containing pictures of rare Creedence singles is a nice touch, real singles fetishists will probably wish to focus their attention on the limited edition version of the collection that comes as a box set of replica singles, further proof that the aura of the recorded past has the potential to be endlessly mined."

In a Renowned for Sound review, founder Brendon Veevers wrote that "The latest singles package brings together a 2 CD set of CCRs best work. A collection of karaoke favourites and beer drinking jukebox anthems, this is a record for not only the die hard CCR followers but also for those with a general soft spot for quality songwriting and well crafted pieces of musical history.", noting that "This collection covers it all. Almost everyone will know these golden oldies"

== Track listing ==
All tracks are written by John Fogerty, except where noted.

Disc one
No.	Title	Writer(s)	Length
1.	"Porterville"		2:17
2.	"Call It Pretending"		2:10
3.	"Suzie Q, Pt. 1"	Dale Hawkins; Robert Chaisson; Stan Lewis; Eleanor Broadwater	4:38
4.	"Suzie Q, Pt. 2"	Hawkins; Chaisson; Lewis; Broadwater	3:52
5.	"I Put a Spell on You"	Screamin' Jay Hawkins	4:33
6.	"Walk on the Water"	J. Fogerty; Tom Fogerty	4:41
7.	"Proud Mary"		3:12
8.	"Born on the Bayou"		3:50
9.	"Bad Moon Rising"		2:20
10.	"Lodi"		3:12
11.	"Green River"		2:36
12.	"Commotion"		2:42
13.	"Fortunate Son"		2:21
14.	"Down on the Corner"		2:41
15.	"Travelin' Band"		2:08
16.	"Who'll Stop the Rain"		2:28

All tracks are written by J. Fogerty, except where noted.

Disc two
No.	Title	Writer(s)	Length
1.	"Run Through the Jungle"		3:08
2.	"Up Around the Bend"		2:41
3.	"Long as I Can See the Light"		3:30
4.	"Lookin' out My Back Door"		2:34
5.	"Have You Ever Seen the Rain?"		2:40
6.	"Hey Tonight"		2:42
7.	"Sweet Hitch-Hiker"		2:57
8.	"Door to Door"		2:06
9.	"Someday Never Comes"		4:02
10.	"Tearin' Up the Country"		2:15
11.	"I Heard it Through the Grapevine" (single edit)	Barrett Strong; Norman Whitfield	3:52
12.	"Good Golly, Miss Molly"	Robert Blackwell; John Marascalco	2:44
13.	"45 Revolutions Per Minute (Part 1)"		3:18
14.	"45 Revolutions Per Minute (Part 2)"		7:20
Total length:			1:35:30

Bonus DVD
No.	Title	Length
1.	"I Heard It Through the Grapevine" (music video)
2.	"Bootleg" (music video)
3.	"I Put a Spell on You" (music video)
4.	"Lookin' out My Back Door" (music video)
