= Keep On Chooglin' =

Compilation album by Creedence Clearwater Revival
- Released: 1995
- Length: 126:38
- Label: Fantasy/Festival

Creedence Clearwater Revival chronology
CCR Forever – 36 Greatest Hits (1995)	Keep On Chooglin' (1995)	At the Movies (2000)

Keep On Chooglin' is a Creedence Clearwater Revival compilation album released in Australasia in 1995, that includes the eponymous track, taken from the album Bayou Country. The meaning of the neologism "choogling" can be found in the lyrics of the song: "...You got to ball and have a good time / And that's what I call chooglin'."

== Track listing ==
=== Disc one ===
1. "Proud Mary" – 3:09
2. "Born on the Bayou" – 5:17
3. "Down on the Corner" – 2:47
4. "Lookin' out My Back Door" – 2:34
5. "Bootleg" – 3:03
6. "The Midnight Special" – 4:14
7. "Travelin' Band" – 2:10
8. "Hey Tonight" – 2:44
9. "Have You Ever Seen the Rain?" – 2:41
10. "Wrote a Song for Everyone" – 4:57
11. "Don't Look Now" – 2:12
12. "Ramble Tamble" – 7:13
13. "Commotion" – 2:45
14. "My Baby Left Me" – 2:20
15. "Lookin' for a Reason" – 3:29
16. "I Heard It Through the Grapevine" (extended version) – 11:05
17. "Susie Q, Pt. 2" – 4:00

=== Disc two ===
1. "Hello Mary Lou" – 2:15
2. "Good Golly Miss Molly" – 2:44
3. "Born to Move" – 5:42
4. "Lodi" – 3:12
5. "It Came Out of the Sky" – 2:55
6. "I Put a Spell on You" – 4:33
7. "Before You Accuse Me" – 3:27
8. "Sailor's Lament" – 3:49
9. "Night Time Is the Right Time" – 3:10
10. "Fortunate Son" – 2:21
11. "Bad Moon Rising" – 2:21
12. "Green River" – 2:34
13. "Who'll Stop the Rain" – 2:29
14. "Up Around the Bend" – 2:43
15. "Cotton Fields" – 2:57
16. "Feelin' Blue" – 5:05
17. "Keep On Chooglin'" – 7:41

== Charts ==
Chart performance for Keep On Chooglin'
Chart (1995)	Peak position
Australian Albums (ARIA)	13
New Zealand Albums (RMNZ)	18

== Certifications ==
Certifications for Keep On Chooglin'
Region	Certification	Certified units/sales
Australia (ARIA)	Platinum	70,000^{^}
^{^} Shipments figures based on certification alone.
