= Live at Woodstock (Creedence Clearwater Revival album) =

Live album by Creedence Clearwater Revival
- Released: August 2, 2019
- Recorded: August 17, 1969
- Venue: Woodstock, Bethel, New York, U.S.
- Genre: Swamp rock
- Length: 50:36
- Label: Craft; Fantasy
- Producer: Brian Kehew (original recordings); Andy Zax (original recordings); Mason Williams (album release)

Creedence Clearwater Revival chronology
| Bad Moon Rising: The Collection (2013) | Live at Woodstock (2019) | At the Royal Albert Hall (2022) |

Live at Woodstock is a live album released on August 2, 2019 via Fantasy Records. The set documents swamp rock band Creedence Clearwater Revival's set at the Woodstock music festival on August 17, 1969. The release has received positive reviews and moderate chart success.

== Recording and release ==
Creedence Clearwater Revival was the first act to sign a contract for August's Woodstock festival in April 1969, for $10,000 (equivalent to $86,000 today). Given their late start time and omission from the Woodstock film (at John Fogerty's insistence), Creedence members have expressed bitterness over their experiences regarding the festival.

In 1994, "Commotion", "Green River", "Ninety Nine and a Half (Won't Do)", and "I Put a Spell on You" appeared on Woodstock: Three Days of Peace and Music. For the 40th anniversary home video release of the film in 2009, the band allowed the inclusion of "Born on the Bayou", "I've Put a Spell On You", and "Keep On Chooglin". Released in 2019, Live at Woodstock contains all 11 songs from their Woodstock performance, and also coincides with a 38-disc box set from Rhino Records compiling the entire festival, Woodstock – Back to the Garden: The Definitive 50th Anniversary Archive.

== Critical reception ==
Professional ratings
Aggregate scores
| Source | Rating |
|---|---|
| Metacritic | 84/100 |
Review scores
| Source | Rating |
| AllMusic | 4.5/5 stars |
| American Songwriter | 4/5 stars |
| Classic Rock | 4.5/5 stars |
| Mojo | 5/5 stars |
| Uncut | 5/5 stars |

According to the review aggregator Metacritic, Live at Woodstock received "universal acclaim" based on a weighted average score of 84 out of 100 from six critic scores.

On AllMusic, Stephen Thomas Erlewine said, "Throughout their hour-long set, CCR sound ferocious, tearing through their hardest material ... The hardness of their choogle is a bit of a revelation, as the band sound fiery in a way that they don't on any of the officially released Creedence live recordings."

In American Songwriter, Hal Horowitz wrote, "The foursome cranks out their songs with requisite energy ... But it's the closing cover of Ray Charles' "Night Time Is the Right Time", plus "Keep on Chooglin'" and "Susie Q", the latter two over ten minutes long, where the sparks really fly ... The remastered audio captures each instrument with surprisingly sharp and clean separation."

In Classic Rock, Fraser Lewry said, "The recording is great, Fogerty's in fine voice throughout, the hits keep coming, and when the band slip into those chugging grooves they're emphatically fierce. "I Put a Spell on You" is even more ominous than the recorded version, and the 20 minutes given over to "Keep On Chooglin'" and "Suzie Q" as the set climaxes are flat-out intense."

In The Spill Magazine, Gerrod Harris wrote, "The band's cover of Screamin' Jay Hawkins' 1956 hit, "I Put a Spell on You" is a definite showstopper. With its haunting melody, rhythms, and chord progressions, Fogerty makes the track his own with a flawless performance that is topped only by his jaw–dropping guitar solo... It comes as no surprise that Live at Woodstock is a stellar live album."

In the Chicago Tribune, Greg Kot said, "Contrary to Fogerty's original take on the performance, it's a blazing document of the band at its peak and should've helped cement the band's legacy ... 'The performances are classic CCR,' bassist Cook later told band biographer Hank Bordowitz, 'and I'm still amazed by the number of people who don't even know we were one of the headliners.'"

== Track listing ==
All songs written by John Fogerty, except where noted

1. "Born on the Bayou" – 5:34
2. "Green River" – 3:16
3. "Ninety-Nine and a Half (Won’t Do)" (Steve Cropper, Wilson Pickett) – 4:46
4. "Bootleg" – 3:38
5. "Commotion" – 2:48
6. "Bad Moon Rising" – 2:13
7. "Proud Mary" – 3:52
8. "I Put a Spell on You" (Jay Hawkins, Herb Slotkin) – 4:28
9. "The Night Time Is the Right Time" (Nappy Brown, Ozzie Cadena, Lew Herman) – 3:30
10. "Keep on Chooglin’" – 10:29
11. "Suzie Q" (Dale Hawkins, Robert Chaisson, Stan Lewis, and Eleanor Broadwater) – 10:52

== Personnel ==
Creedence Clearwater Revival

- John Fogerty – vocals, guitar, harmonica, piano
- Tom Fogerty – rhythm guitar, backing vocals, co-lead vocals on "Suzie Q"
- Stu Cook – bass guitar
- Doug Clifford – drums

Production

- Mason Williams – album release producer
- Andy Zax – audio production
- Brian Kehew – audio production, mixing
- Dave Schultz – mastering
- Edwin Kramer – location recording engineer
- Lee Osborne – location recording engineer
- Hanley Sound, Inc. – original 8-track recordings
- Henry Diltz – photography
- Tommy Steele – design
- Ryan Jebavy – editorial

== Charts ==
Weekly sales chart performance for Live at Woodstock
| Chart (2019) | Peak position |
|---|---|
| Austrian Albums (Ö3 Austria) | 29 |
| Belgian Albums (Ultratop Flanders) | 60 |
| Belgian Albums (Ultratop Wallonia) | 25 |
| French Albums (SNEP) | 137 |
| German Albums (Offizielle Top 100) | 34 |
| Scottish Albums (OCC) | 24 |
| Spanish Albums (PROMUSICAE) | 70 |
| Swiss Albums (Schweizer Hitparade) | 60 |
