= Hits Album =

Greatest hits album by Creedence Clearwater Revival
- Released: 1981
- Length: 68:59
- Label: Fantasy

Creedence Clearwater Revival chronology
Creedence Country (1981)	Hits Album (1981)	Chooglin' (1982)

Hits Album is an album by American rock band Creedence Clearwater Revival, released in 1981.

== Track listing ==
All songs are written by John Fogerty, except where noted.

No.	Title	Original album	Length
1.	"Bad Moon Rising"	Green River, 1969	2:21
2.	"Travelin' Band"	Cosmo's Factory, 1970	2:08
3.	"Up Around the Bend"	Cosmo's Factory	2:41
4.	"Long as I Can See the Light"	Cosmo's Factory	3:33
5.	"Who'll Stop the Rain"	Cosmo's Factory	2:29
6.	"Lodi"	Green River	3:09
7.	"Commotion"	Green River	2:40
8.	"Fortunate Son"	Willy and the Poor Boys, 1969	2:21
9.	"Born on the Bayou"	Bayou Country, 1969	5:16
10.	"Keep on Chooglin'"	Bayou Country	7:40
11.	"Proud Mary"	Bayou Country	3:07
12.	"Down on the Corner"	Willy and the Poor Boys	2:47
13.	"Green River"	Green River	2:36
14.	"Have You Ever Seen the Rain?"	Pendulum, 1970	2:39
15.	"Sweet Hitch-Hiker"	Mardi Gras, 1972	2:59
16.	"Lookin' Out My Back Door"	Cosmo's Factory	2:35
17.	"Hey Tonight"	Pendulum	2:43
18.	"I Heard It Through the Grapevine" (Single version; originally by Marvin Gaye) (Norman Whitfield, Barrett Strong)	Cosmo's Factory	3:53
19.	"Good Golly Miss Molly" (originally by Little Richard; John Marascalco, Robert "Bumps" Blackwell)	Bayou Country	2:43
20.	"Susie Q" (originally by Dale Hawkins; Hawkins, Stan Lewis, Eleanor Broadwater)	Creedence Clearwater Revival, 1968	8:39

== Personnel ==
- John Fogerty – guitar, vocals
- Tom Fogerty – guitar, vocals (except track 15)
- Stu Cook – bass
- Doug Clifford – drums
