= Creedence Clearwater Revival Covers the Classics =

Compilation album by Creedence Clearwater Revival
- Released: 2009
- Length: 39:33
- Label: Fantasy
- Producer: John Fogerty

Creedence Clearwater Revival chronology
Best Of (2008)	Creedence Clearwater Revival Covers the Classics (2009)	The Singles Collection (2009)

Creedence Clearwater Revival Covers the Classics is a compilation album by American rock band Creedence Clearwater Revival. Released in 2009, the album contains cover versions of songs as recorded by the band.

In a review for AllMusic, Stephen Thomas Erlewine wrote, "While it might be hard to discern who this is for[...]it's still a ripping good time, a perfect party record for any occasion."

== Track listing ==
1. "Good Golly Miss Molly" (John Marascalco, Robert "Bumps" Blackwell) - (from the album Bayou Country, 1969) – 2:41
2. "I Heard It Through the Grapevine" (Norman Whitfield, Barrett Strong) - (Single version) (from the album Cosmo's Factory, 1970) – 3:51
3. "Hello Mary Lou" (Gene Pitney) - (from the album Mardi Gras, 1972) – 2:12
4. "Susie Q" (Part 1) (Dale Hawkins) - (from the album Creedence Clearwater Revival, 1968) – 4:33
5. "Midnight Special" (traditional) - (from the album Willy and the Poor Boys, 1969) – 4:11
6. "Ooby Dooby" (Dick Penner, Dick Lee Moore) - (from the album Cosmo's Factory) – 2:05
7. "The Night Time Is the Right Time" (Lew Herman, Nappy Brown, Ozzie Cadena) - (from the album Green River, 1969) – 3:07
8. "Cotton Fields" (Lead Belly) - (from the album Willy and the Poor Boys) – 2:55
9. "Ninety-Nine and a Half" (Wilson Pickett, Steve Cropper, Eddie Floyd) - (from the album Creedence Clearwater Revival) – 3:36
10. "Before You Accuse Me" (Bo Diddley) - (from the album Cosmo's Factory) – 3:26
11. "My Baby Left Me" (Arthur Crudup) - (from the album Cosmo's Factory) – 2:17
12. "I Put a Spell on You" (Jay Hawkins) - (from the album Creedence Clearwater Revival) – 4:31
