= Bad Moon Rising: The Collection =

Compilation album by Creedence Clearwater Revival
- Released: April 22, 2013 (CD) October 4, 2019 (LP)
- Recorded: October 1967–January 1972
- Genre: Rock
- Length: 72:51 (CD)
- Label: Universal; Spectrum Music
- Producer: Saul Zaentz; John Fogerty; Doug Clifford; Stu Cook

Creedence Clearwater Revival chronology
Ultimate Creedence Clearwater Revival: Greatest Hits & All-Time Classics (2012)	Bad Moon Rising: The Collection (2013)	Greatest Hits (2014)

Bad Moon Rising: The Collection is a compilation album by the American rock band Creedence Clearwater Revival. It was initially released in 2013 by Spectrum Music and subsequently reissued by Universal in late 2019. The album charted in the Netherlands, Scotland, Ireland and the United Kingdom.

== Reception ==
Professional ratings
Review scores
Source	Rating
AllMusic	3/5 stars

In a review of the CD version of the album on AllMusic, Stephen Thomas Erlewine states that it "takes some odd turns in its 18 tracks" and that "there are a few beloved non hits ("Tombstone Shadow," "Bootleg") and several hits ("Bad Moon Rising," "Green River," "Proud Mary") just enough to make you realize all the other songs are missing ("Who'll Stop the Rain," "Travelin' Band," "Have You Ever Seen the Rain," "Lodi," for starters)." and that "this is enjoyable but there so many terrific CCR comps out there, it's hard to see why you'd select this one over the other titles."

== Track listing ==
The track listings are different between versions.

=== CD Track listing ===
1. Born on the Bayou – 5:13
2. Bad Moon Rising – 2:20
3. Green River – 2:33
4. Up Around the Bend – 2:40
5. Sweet Hitch-Hiker – 2:56
6. Ninety-Nine and a Half (Won't Do) – 3:36
7. Proud Mary – 3:05
8. Someday Never Comes – 4:02
9. The Midnight Special – 4:13
10. Fortunate Son (Live) – 2:25
11. Chameleon – 3:19
12. Cotton FIelds – 2:57
13. Bootleg – 3:01
14. Tombstone Shadow – 3:39
15. It's Just a Thought – 3:45
16. Born to Move – 5:39
17. Effigy – 6:26
18. Keep On Chooglin' (Live) – 9:12

=== LP track listing ===
Side one

1. Born on the Bayou – 5:13
2. Bad Moon Rising – 2:20
3. Green River – 2:33
4. Up Around the Bend – 2:40
5. Sweet Hitch-Hiker – 2:56
6. Fortunate Son (Live) – 2:25
7. Chameleon – 3:19
8. Proud Mary – 3:05

Side two

1. Have You Ever Seen the Rain? – 2:38
2. Lookin' out My Back Door – 2:32
3. Someday Never Comes – 4:02
4. Bootleg – 3:01
5. It's Just a Thought – 3:45
6. Cotton FIelds – 2:57
7. Keep On Chooglin' (Live) – 9:12

== Personnel ==
CD version

- John Fogerty – guitar, vocals, harmonica
- Tom Fogerty – guitar, vocals (Not present on Fortunate Son (Live) or Keep on Chooglin' (Live).)
- Stu Cook – bass
- Doug Clifford – drums

Vinyl version

- John Fogerty – guitar, vocals, tambourine, organ, harmonica
- Tom Fogerty – guitar, vocals (Not present on Fortunate Son (Live) or Keep on Chooglin' (Live).)
- Stu Cook – bass, piano
- Doug Clifford – drums

== Charts ==
=== Weekly charts ===
Weekly chart performance for Bad Moon Rising: The Collection
Chart (2019–2020)	Peak position
Dutch Albums (Album Top 100)	18
Irish Albums (OCC)	46
Scottish Albums (OCC)	22
UK Vinyl Albums	36

=== Year-end charts ===
2013 year-end chart performance for Bad Moon Rising: The Collection
Chart (2013)	Position
UK Albums (OCC)	170

2024 year-end chart performance for Bad Moon Rising: The Collection
Chart (2024)	Position
Australian Albums (ARIA)	86

== Certifications ==
Certifications for Bad Moon Rising: The Collection
Region	Certification	Certified units/sales
United Kingdom (BPI)	Gold	100,000^{‡}
^{‡} Sales+streaming figures based on certification alone.
