= 20 Golden Greats (Creedence Clearwater Revival album) =

Greatest hits album by Creedence Clearwater Revival
- Released: 1979
- Recorded: 1968–1972
- Genre: Americana; swamp rock
- Length: 61:41
- Label: Fantasy

Creedence Clearwater Revival chronology
Chronicle: The 20 Greatest Hits (1976)	20 Golden Greats (1979)	The Concert (1980)

20 Golden Greats is a compilation album of hits by Creedence Clearwater Revival released on the Fantasy record label in Australia and New Zealand in 1979. The album spent 2 weeks at the top of the Australian album charts in 1980.

== Track listing ==
1. "Proud Mary" – 3:08
2. "Who'll Stop the Rain" – 2:28
3. "Hey Tonight" – 2:42
4. "Travelin' Band" – 2:09
5. "Lookin' out My Back Door" – 2:32
6. "I Heard It Through the Grapevine" – 3:46
7. "Ooby Dooby" – 2:07
8. "Born on the Bayou" – 5:16
9. "I Put a Spell on You" – 4:31
10. "Sweet Hitch-Hiker" – 2:55
11. "Green River" – 2:34
12. "Bad Moon Rising" – 2:19
13. "Lodi" – 3:11
14. "Down on the Corner" – 2:44
15. "Fortunate Son" – 2:19
16. "Long as I Can See the Light" – 3:32
17. "Run Through the Jungle" – 3:06
18. "Up Around the Bend" – 2:40
19. "Have You Ever Seen the Rain?" – 2:39
20. "Susie Q" – 4:34

== Chart positions ==
Year	Chart	Position
1980	Australian Kent Music Report Albums Chart	1

== Certifications ==
Region	Certification	Certified units/sales
Australia (ARIA)	Platinum	50,000^{^}
^{^} Shipments figures based on certification alone.
