= Chooglin' =

1982 album by Creedence Clearwater Revival

Compilation album by Creedence Clearwater Revival
- Released: Summer 1982
- Genres: Swamp rock; Rock
- Length: 38:53
- Label: Fantasy
- Producer: John Fogerty

Creedence Clearwater Revival chronology
| Hits Album (1981) | Chooglin' (1982) | At the Movies (1985) |

Professional ratings
Review scores
| Source | Rating |
|---|---|
| The Encyclopedia of Popular Music | 3/5 stars |

Chooglin' is a 5-track compilation album by the American swamp rock band Creedence Clearwater Revival.

== Background ==
Fantasy Records released the compilation in the summer of 1982. According to Ralph Kaffel, the then-president of the label: "We felt that since reissue product had concentrated on the single versions, it might be a good idea to put together an album of original longer cuts where the band gets to stretch out... We did special packaging and used rice paper sleeves, and we came up with what is not strictly speaking an audiophile record, but one which is certainly superior to a regular record."

== Reception ==
Cash Box stated that "AOR and oldies programmers should enjoy kicking back and cueing up such all-time country rock hits as "Susie Q" and “Born on the Bayou" guaranteed to bring back good memories and each still able to generate insightful social commentary flavored with the sounds of the Mississippi Delta." Mix stated that it is here to "remind us of rock's real roots, presenting some of Fogerty's finest moments as he works himself into a frenzy of emotional exorcism."

== Track listing ==
All tracks written by John Fogerty except "I Heard It Through the Grapevine", written by Norman Whitfield and Barrett Strong, and "Suzie Q", written by Dale Hawkins, Robert Chaisson, Stan Lewis and Eleanor Broadwater.

Side one

1. I Heard It Through the Grapevine – 11:05
2. Keep On Chooglin' – 7:43

Side two

1. Suzie Q – 8:34
2. Pagan Baby – 6:25
3. Born on the Bayou – 5:10

== Personnel ==
According to the liner notes:

- John Fogerty – lead guitar, vocals, harmonica
- Tom Fogerty – guitar
- Stu Cook – bass
- Doug Clifford – drums

== Charts ==
| Chart (1982) | Peak position |
|---|---|
| US Bubbling Under Top LPs | 205 |

== Release history ==
| Region | Date | Format | Label | Catalog |
|---|---|---|---|---|
| United States | 1982 | LP | Fantasy | F-9621 |
