= The Concert (Creedence Clearwater Revival album) =

Live album by Creedence Clearwater Revival
- Released: October 1980
- Recorded: January 31, 1970
- Venue: Oakland–Alameda County Coliseum Arena in Oakland, California
- Studio: Wally Heider Recording Mobile
- Length: 49:25
- Label: Fantasy
- Producer: Russ Gary (recorder)

Creedence Clearwater Revival chronology
20 Golden Greats (1979)	The Concert (1980)	Creedence Country (1981)

Alternative cover
- Initial cover art, erroneously titled The Royal Albert Hall Concert

The Concert is the second live album by American rock band Creedence Clearwater Revival, released by Fantasy Records in October 1980. It was recorded at the Oakland–Alameda County Coliseum Arena in Oakland, California, on January 31, 1970.

== Overview ==
Originally, the album was mistakenly titled The Royal Albert Hall Concert. When it was discovered that it was not, in fact, recorded at the Royal Albert Hall, it was renamed for later reissues. A Cash Box magazine news article dated January 31, 1981, provides a summary of the mistake:

EMBARRASSED ON THE BAYOU — Oops, that smokin' Creedence Clearwater Revival album, "The Royal Albert Hall Concert", was not recorded at the famous London venue after all. In one of the greatest labeling faux pas in recent memory, Fantasy has now discovered that it had inadequately marked a master tape and the contents on the brilliant $5.98 live LP have been traced to a January 1970 CCR concert recorded at the Oakland Coliseum. Fantasy is now in the process of correcting album covers and labels for future pressings; meanwhile, interim copies will carry an explanatory sticker. When the new covers are ready, the album title will read "Creedence Clearwater Revival; The Concert". Those who have helped propel the bogus “Royal Albert Hall Concert" to #120 bullet on the Cash Box LP chart have a collector's item on their hands. Hats off to the Berkeley-based label for admitting the error.

The album reached No. 62 on the Billboard 200 in 1981. It was awarded gold status (500,000 units sold) by the Recording Industry Association of America on February 27, 1986, and platinum status (1,000,000 units sold) on September 30, 1996.

== Track listing ==
Professional ratings
Review scores
Source	Rating
Allmusic	4/5 stars
Encyclopedia of Popular Music	2/5 stars
Robert Christgau's Record Guide	B

All songs written by John Fogerty, except where noted.

Side one

1. "Born on the Bayou" – 5:14
2. "Green River" – 3:00
3. "Tombstone Shadow" – 4:05
4. "Don't Look Now" – 2:05
5. "Travelin' Band" – 2:18
6. "Who'll Stop the Rain" – 2:31
7. "Bad Moon Rising" – 2:16
8. "Proud Mary" – 3:09

Side two

1. "Fortunate Son" – 2:22
2. "Commotion" – 2:36
3. "The Midnight Special" (Traditional, arr. by John Fogerty) – 3:48
4. "Night Time Is the Right Time" (Nappy Brown, Ozzie Cadena, Lew Herman) – 3:29
5. "Down on the Corner" – 2:44
6. "Keep on Chooglin'" – 9:09

== Personnel ==
Per sleeve notes

- John Fogerty – lead guitar, lead vocals, harp
- Tom Fogerty – rhythm guitar, backing vocals
- Stu Cook – bass, backing vocals
- Doug Clifford – drums
- Russ Gary – recording
- Danny Kopelson – remixing
- George Horn – mastering
- Phil Carroll – art direction
- Jim Marshall – photography

== Charts ==
Chart (1980)	Peak position
US Billboard 200	62

== Certifications ==
Region	Certification	Certified units/sales
United States (RIAA)	Platinum	1,000,000^{^}
^{^} Shipments figures based on certification alone.

== Release history ==
Region	Date	Label	Format	Catalog
United States	October 1980	Fantasy Records	LP	4501
Europe	1980	Fantasy Records	LP	0061.136
United States	1986	Fantasy Records	CD	FCD-4501-2
United States	1986	Fantasy Records	LP	MPF-4501
United States	1986	Fantasy Records	Cassette	5MPF-4501
