= At the Movies (Creedence Clearwater Revival album) =

Compilation album by Creedence Clearwater Revival
- Released: 1985
- Length: 53:57 (CD); 35:51 (LP & Cassette)
- Label: Fantasy

Creedence Clearwater Revival chronology
Chooglin' (1982)	At the Movies (1985)	Chronicle, Vol. 2 (1986)

Professional ratings
Review scores
Source	Rating
AllMusic	2.5/5 stars

At the Movies is a compilation album by American rock band Creedence Clearwater Revival, originally released on LP and cassette in 1985 as The Movie Album. The CD version was released in 2000 with five more songs included and the album name was changed to At The Movies. As the titles suggest, these albums compile CCR songs that were featured in major motion pictures.

== Track listing ==
=== 1985 original release ===
1. "The Midnight Special" – 4:12
2. "Proud Mary" – 3:08
3. "I Heard It Through the Grapevine" – 11:03
4. "Bad Moon Rising" – 2:19
5. "Keep on Chooglin'" – 7:41
6. "Who'll Stop the Rain" – 2:27
7. "Fortunate Son" – 2:19
8. "Hey Tonight" – 2:42

=== 2000 reissue additions ===
9. "Born on the Bayou" – 5:15
10. "Lookin' Out My Back Door" – 2:32
11. "Run Through the Jungle" – 3:06
12. "Susie Q, Pt. 1" – 4:34
13. "Up Around the Bend" – 2:39
