= Creedence Country =

Compilation album by Creedence Clearwater Revival
- Released: October 1981
- Recorded: 1969–1972
- Length: 39:50
- Label: Fantasy
- Producer: John Fogerty
- Compiler: Creedence Clearwater Revival members

Creedence Clearwater Revival chronology
The Concert (1980)	Creedence Country (1981)	Hits Album (1982)

Singles from Creedence Country
- 1. "Cotton Fields" Released: November 1981

Creedence Country is a compilation album by American rock band Creedence Clearwater Revival (CCR). It was released by Fantasy Records in October 1981 (see 1981 in music) with the purpose of infiltrating the country market.

There was one single released from Creedence Country, "Cotton Fields" b/w "Lodi", in November. The single charted in Billboard magazine's Hot Country Singles chart, while the album did not chart.

The album has been re-released in multiple formats, including a 2004 remastered CD with three bonus tracks.

== Compilation and songs ==
According to an article in Billboard magazine, the idea for Creedence Country came from Bob Saporiti after listening to CCR's albums and hearing a prominent country influence in the group's songs. In the article, Saporiti said that the (former) members of the band compiled the songs for the album; although, he did not specify which members were involved.

Of the 12 songs on the original album, none were from the group's self-titled debut album or Bayou Country, three were from Green River, two were from Willy and the Poor Boys, five were from Cosmo's Factory, and two were from Mardi Gras. Of the three reissue bonus tracks two were from Mardi Gras and one was from Pendulum.

Only two songs were previously mainstream charting singles on the Billboard Hot 100, "Lodi" (#52) and "Lookin' Out My Back Door" (#2). Early in 1982, "Cotton Fields" peaked at #50 on Billboard's Hot Country Singles chart.

== Track listing ==
Professional ratings
Review scores
Source	Rating
Allmusic	3/5 stars

All songs written by John Fogerty, except where indicated.

Side one

1. "Lookin' for a Reason" – 3:27
2. "Don't Look Now (It Ain't You or Me)" – 2:11
3. "Lodi" – 3:11
4. "My Baby Left Me" (Arthur Crudup) – 2:19
5. "Hello Mary Lou" (Gene Pitney) – 2:13
6. "Ramble Tamble" – 7:11

Side two

1. "Cotton Fields (The Cotton Song)" (Huddy Ledbetter) – 2:56
2. "Before You Accuse Me (Take a Look at Yourself)" (Ellas McDaniel) – 3:26
3. "Wrote a Song for Everyone" – 4:56
4. "Ooby Dooby" (Wade Moore, Dick Penner) - 2:08
5. "Cross-Tie Walker" – 3:18
6. "Lookin' Out My Back Door" – 2:31

Bonus tracks on 2004 CD release

13. "Need Someone to Hold" (Stu Cook) – 3:00
14. "Tearin' Up the Country" (Doug Clifford) – 2:15
15. "It's Just a Thought" – 3:55

== Personnel ==
The following people contributed to Creedence Country:

- John Fogerty – vocals, lead guitar, producer, arranger
- Tom Fogerty – rhythm guitar; except on "Lookin' for a Reason", "Hello Mary Lou", "Need Someone to Hold", and "Tearin' Up the Country"
- Stu Cook – bass
- Doug Clifford – vocals on "Tearin' Up the Country" and "Need Someone to Hold", drums, percussion
- Hoyt Axton – sleeve notes
- Phil Carroll – art direction
- Jim Marshall – photography
- George Horn – digital remastering
