= Revival (John Fogerty album) =

Studio album by John Fogerty
- Released: October 2, 2007
- Recorded: NRG Recording Studios, North Hollywood, CA
- Genre: Roots rock; heartland rock; Americana
- Length: 40:41
- Label: Fantasy
- Producer: John Fogerty

John Fogerty chronology
The Long Road Home - In Concert (2006)	Revival (2007)	The Blue Ridge Rangers Rides Again (2009)

Revival is the seventh solo studio album by the American guitarist and singer-songwriter John Fogerty. Released in 2007, it was his first new album in three years, and also his third album since rejoining Fantasy Records. The album was released on October 2, 2007.

The cover design echoes the silhouette design of Fogerty's first solo album The Blue Ridge Rangers. The first single from the album was "Don't You Wish It Was True". The album contains two war protest songs: "Long Dark Night" and "I Can't Take It No More", both of which speak out against the Bush administration and the Iraq War. The latter song contains a lyric that refers to one of his hits with CCR, by referring to Bush as a "Fortunate Son". Also, this song sounds like Ramones-style punk rock. Fogerty has done some experimentation with that sound ("She's Got Baggage" from Deja Vu (All Over Again)). Another song, "Summer of Love", is a tribute to Cream and Jimi Hendrix, and has a musical citation from "Sunshine of Your Love". "Creedence Song" refers to CCR's swamp rock.

The album debuted at No. 14 on the US Billboard 200 chart, selling about 65,000 copies in its first week. It was nominated for a Grammy Award for Best Rock Album of 2008, but lost to Foo Fighters's Echoes, Silence, Patience & Grace. This album was No. 11 on Rolling Stone's list of the Top 50 Albums of 2007. In the same magazine, the song "Gunslinger" was No. 12 on the list of the 100 Best Songs of 2007.

Professional ratings
Aggregate scores
Source	Rating
Metacritic	78/100
Review scores
Source	Rating
AllMusic	4.5/5 stars
American Songwriter	4.5/5 stars
The Boston Phoenix	3.5/4 stars
Entertainment Weekly	B+
Mojo	3/5 stars
PopMatters	6/10
Q	3/5 stars
Rolling Stone	3.5/5 stars
Tom Hull – on the Web	A
Uncut	4/5 stars

== Track listing ==
All songs written by John Fogerty.

1. "Don't You Wish It Was True" – 4:11
2. "Gunslinger" – 3:31
3. "Creedence Song" – 3:49
4. "Broken Down Cowboy" – 3:51
5. "River Is Waiting" – 3:22
6. "Long Dark Night" – 3:07
7. "Summer of Love" – 3:19
8. "Natural Thing" – 4:00
9. "It Ain't Right" – 1:49
10. "I Can't Take It No More" – 1:39
11. "Somebody Help Me" – 4:27
12. "Longshot" – 3:38

=== Bonus tracks ===
13. "Sweet Hitch-Hiker" (Live from the Glastonbury Jazz Festival 2007)
  - US only bonus track available exclusively at Best Buy stores;
14. "Green River" (Live)
  - US iTunes Store bonus track
- A special CD/DVD set edition of the album was available at Wal-Mart stores: REVIVAL - Exclusive Bonus DVD. The CD does not contain the two bonus tracks.

== Personnel ==
- John Fogerty – vocals, guitar, lyrics, arrangement, production
- Hunter Perrin – guitar
- Benmont Tench – Hammond B-3 organ (on "Natural Thing", "River Is Waiting" and "Somebody Help Me"), Wurlitzer electric piano (on "River Is Waiting" and "Somebody Help Me")
- David Santos – bass guitar
- Kenny Aronoff – drums, percussion
- Julia Waters, Maxine Waters, Oren Waters – backing vocals (on "Don't You Wish It Was True", "River Is Waiting" and "Longshot")

== Recording ==
section ref: Concord

- Arranged and produced by John Fogerty
- Written by John Fogerty (Shaty Kelyn Music – BMI)
- Recorded by Jim Scott, Seth Presant and Ryan Freeland
- Recorded at NRG Recording, North Hollywood, CA; G Studio Digital, Studio City, CA; and Soundstudio, Lowengasse, Frankfurt, Germany
- Assistant engineers: Keven Dean, Dave Colvin
- Mixed by Jim Scott and John Fogerty
- Mastered by Robert Ludwig at Gateway Mastering, Portland, ME

== Concert tour ==
On the opening night of the tour at the Hammerstein Ballroom the beginning of the show features the album cover artwork projected on a giant screen. The silhouette of Fogerty bends down, picks up a guitar from the corn, and puts it on. As the lights come on it is revealed that it is really Fogerty playing the opening song "River is Waiting" high in the air.

The sets have varied in length from 24 to 28 songs and are a mixture of new songs and classic Creedence Clearwater Revival songs.

== Charts ==
=== Weekly chart s ===
Chart (2007–2008)	Peak position
Australian Albums (ARIA)	33
Austrian Albums (Ö3 Austria)	39
Belgian Albums (Ultratop Flanders)	31
Belgian Albums (Ultratop Wallonia)	60
Danish Albums (Hitlisten)	14
Dutch Albums (Album Top 100)	22
Finnish Albums (Suomen virallinen lista)	17
French Albums (SNEP)	77
German Albums (Offizielle Top 100)	24
Italian Albums (FIMI)	41
Norwegian Albums (VG-lista)	6
Swedish Albums (Sverigetopplistan)	5
Swiss Albums (Schweizer Hitparade)	45
UK Albums (OCC)	80
US Billboard 200	14
US Top Rock Albums (Billboard)	4

=== Year-end charts ===
Chart (2007)	Position
Swedish Albums (Sverigetopplistan)	57
