= Roy Montrell =

American musician (1928–1979)

Roy Montrell (27 February 1928 – 16 May 1979) was an American rhythm & blues guitarist who performed on hundreds of records produced in New Orleans.

Born Raymond Eustis Montrell, in New Orleans, Louisiana, he performed as a session musician for many famous artists, as well as playing in Fats Domino's band. He played on Little Richard's "Lucille", Good Golly, Miss Molly, "Heeby-Jeebies", and "All Around the World," all charting R&B hits recorded in 1956.

Montrell's 1956 recording of "(Everytime I Hear) That Mellow Saxophone", co-written with John Marascalco and Bumps Blackwell, has been widely covered by acts including the Stray Cats, Imelda May and Supercharge. It was chosen by Bob Dylan for the "Musical Instruments" episode of his Theme Time Radio Hour series and is featured on the 2-CD set of tracks from the show.

Montrell died, aged 51, in Amsterdam, The Netherlands, while on a concert tour.
