= Bootleg (song) =

- France single sleeve

Song by Creedence Clearwater Revival

from the album Bayou Country
- B-side: "Good Golly, Miss Molly" (France only single)
- Released: January 15, 1969
- Genre: Swamp rock; blues
- Length: 3:03
- Label: Fantasy
- Songwriter: John Fogerty
- Producer: J. Fogerty

Music video
- "Bootleg" on YouTube

"Bootleg" is a song by the American swamp rock band Creedence Clearwater Revival, released as the second track on the band's second studio album Bayou Country. Written by John Fogerty, the song is about the belief that things that are illegal are often great.

== Background ==
"Bootleg" was written by John Fogerty and is about the belief that things that are bad for you are great. As Ray Rezos puts the song's subject; "“Bootleg” is a good, short number which explains how something often becomes more attractive when it is illegal." "Bootleg" was recorded with Tom Fogerty on a tuned down Fender King, though Tom's hand would cramp when learning how to play it. An alternate take of the song is included on the 40th anniversary edition of the album, and is almost twice as long as the final version. "Bootleg" is very similar to the album's closer "Keep On Chooglin'", specifically with its lead guitar riff.

== Release and reception ==
Uncut magazine wrote in their May 14, 2014 special Creedence Clearwater Revival issue that "it’s a moonshine groove of the first order, its propulsive energy derived from the twin acoustic guitars (played by Tom and John) and John’s call-and-response vocal." In a ranking of every Creedence Clearwater Revival 1969 song from worst to best, Michael Gallucci placed it as number 13, calling it a "companion piece" to "Born on the Bayou", the opening track of Bayou Country. Stephen Thomas Erlewine wrote in an AllMusic review that it "is a minor masterpiece, thanks to its tough acoustic foundation, sterling guitar work, and clever story." The song is included on compilations such as More Creedence Gold, Ultimate Creedence Clearwater Revival: Greatest Hits & All-Time Classics, their 2001 self-titled box set, and a live version on The Long Road Home. The band filmed a music video for "Bootleg", which shows the band performing the song on a riverboat named "Princess". The song was released as a France only single, b-sided with their cover of "Good Golly, Miss Molly". The song's lyrics were involved in a lawsuit under the title of "Stoner vs. eBay Inc.", specifically quoting the lines "Take you a glass of water, make it against the law/See how good the water tastes, when you can't have any at all".

== Personnel ==
According to the liner notes of the album, except where noted:

- John Fogerty – lead guitar, vocal
- Tom Fogerty – acoustic guitar
- Stu Cook – bass
- Doug Clifford – drums

== Other versions ==
When John Fogerty regained access to his back catalog in 2023, he re-recorded "Bootleg" and many other Creedence Clearwater Revival songs for his album titled Legacy: The Creedence Clearwater Revival Years. The Mexican rock band Los Lobos recorded a cover version for Quiero Creedence, a Creedence Clearwater Revival Latin America tribute album. The southeastern Texan rock band Mike Zito & the Wheel recorded a cover of the song for their 2015 album Keep Coming Back.
