= Jeronimo (band) =

- Origin: Germany
- Genres: hard rock

Jeronimo was a German hard rock band of the early 1970s. They had chart success in Europe with singles "Heya" and "Na Na Hey Hey", and released three studio albums in 1970-1972.

== Band history ==
Jeronimo were founded in 1969 by Rainer Marz (lead guitar, vocals), Gunnar Schäfer (bass guitar, vocals) and Ringo Funk (drums, lead vocals). Their first two singles released in 1969-1970, "Heya" and "Na Na Hey Hey" (both cover songs), became hits in several European countries.

In 1970, Jeronimo toured through Germany with Steppenwolf. The same year, they performed at the legendary Progressive Pop Festival in Cologne. Following that, Jeronimo shared the headlines with such groups as Deep Purple and Golden Earring at various European open-air festivals. On June 9 and 11, 1970, they represented Germany in the Barbarela de Conjuntos 70 contest held at the Barbarela Discotheque in Mallorca, but were disqualified for running overtime.

Jeronimo's first studio release was a pink vinyl split with Creedence Clearwater Revival called Spirit Orgaszmus, which was a success throughout Europe. All of the Jeronimo's six tracks made their way onto the band's debut longplay Cosmic Blues (1970, Bellaphone), its music described as "Cream meets The Kinks." In 1971, Jeronimo's biggest stage-performance in Lausanne for UNICEF was televised worldwide. Jeronimo could be seen in numerous European television shows and in Germany they were on Hits a Gogo, Beatclub and Bananas.

In 1971, Marz departed and with Michael Koch the band released their second album, Jeronimo (1971). The third one, Time Ride (1972), now on Bacillus Records, proved to be their final one.

In 1999-2000, their hits "Heya" and "Na Na Hey Hey" were re-released on numerous hit-compilations. After some negotiations with the record company in Frankfurt, Ringo Funk successfully acquired the rights to all of Jeronimo's songs in November 2000. In the spring of 2002, 4 CD's (Jeronimo, Cosmic Blues, Time Ride and The Best Of Jeronimo) were released, digitally remastered from the original recordings, with bonus tracks on each of the CD's. The original line-up reunited in 2001 to play live but no new material has been released.

== Discography ==
- Spirit Orgaszmus of Jeronimo and Creedence Clearwater Revival (split LP, 1970)
- Cosmic Blues (1970)
- Jeronimo (1971)
- Time Ride (1972)
- Best of Jeronimo (2003, CD)
- Timevision (2007, DVD)
