= Green River (album) =

Studio album by Creedence Clearwater Revival
- Released: August 7, 1969
- Recorded: March–June 1969
- Studio: Wally Heider (San Francisco)
- Genres: Swamp rock; blues rock; rock and roll; Americana
- Length: 29:25
- Label: Fantasy
- Producer: John Fogerty

Creedence Clearwater Revival chronology
Bayou Country (1969)	Green River (1969)	Willy and the Poor Boys (1969)

Singles from Green River
- 1. "Bad Moon Rising"/"Lodi" Released: April 1969; 2. "Green River"/"Commotion" Released: July 1969

Green River is the third studio album by the American rock band Creedence Clearwater Revival, released on August 7, 1969, by Fantasy Records. It was the second of three albums they released in that year, preceded by Bayou Country in January and followed by Willy and the Poor Boys in November.

== Background ==
In January 1969, Creedence Clearwater Revival released their second studio album Bayou Country featuring their breakout single "Proud Mary" (backed with "Born on the Bayou"), which reached No. 2 on the Billboard Hot 100. Producer and primary songwriter John Fogerty was the driving creative force behind CCR, which would record three albums in 1969 alone. The band saw themselves as more disciplined than other San Francisco-based bands, with drummer Doug Clifford recalling to Jeb Wright of Goldmine in 2013, "We went to see the local bands and they were so stoned they weren’t even in tune and they were really terrible...We made a pact on the floor of the Fillmore, right then, where we would do no drugs or alcohol. We decided to get high on the music, or get out of the business."

Going against the grain at the times, Creedence eschewed the acid-inspired free-form jams favored by many rock bands, for tightly structured roots music with an unmistakable rockabilly edge. "I didn't like the idea of those acid-rock, 45-minute guitar solos," Fogerty explained to Uncut's David Cavanagh in 2012. "I thought music should get to the point a little more quickly than that."

== Songwriting ==
CCR's third studio album includes two of their biggest hits, "Bad Moon Rising" and "Green River", both of which peaked on the U.S. chart at No. 2, as well as the highly regarded "Lodi" (No. 52) and "Commotion" (No. 30). "Bad Moon Rising" is notable for its jaunty, happy music juxtaposed with its dark, ominous lyrics. It was inspired by a scene in the 1941 film The Devil and Daniel Webster involving a hurricane, with John Fogerty stating that the words told of "the apocalypse that was going to be visited upon us. It wasn't until the band was learning the song that I realized the dichotomy. Here you got this song with all these hurricanes and blowing and raging ruin and all that, but...It's a happy-sounding tune, right? Regarding the title track, Fogerty recalled in 1993:

Green River is really about this place where I used to go as a kid on Putah Creek, near Winters, California. I went there with my family every year until I was ten. Lot of happy memories there. I learned how to swim there. There was a rope hanging from the tree. Certainly dragonflies, bullfrogs. There was a little cabin we would stay in owned by a descendant of Buffalo Bill Cody. That's the reference in the song to Cody Jr. The actual specific reference, "Green River," I got from a soda pop-syrup label. You used to be able to go into a soda fountain, and they had these bottles of flavored syrup. My flavor was called Green River. It was green, lime flavored, and they would empty some out over some ice and pour some of that soda water on it, and you had yourself a Green River.

In 2012, Fogerty stated:

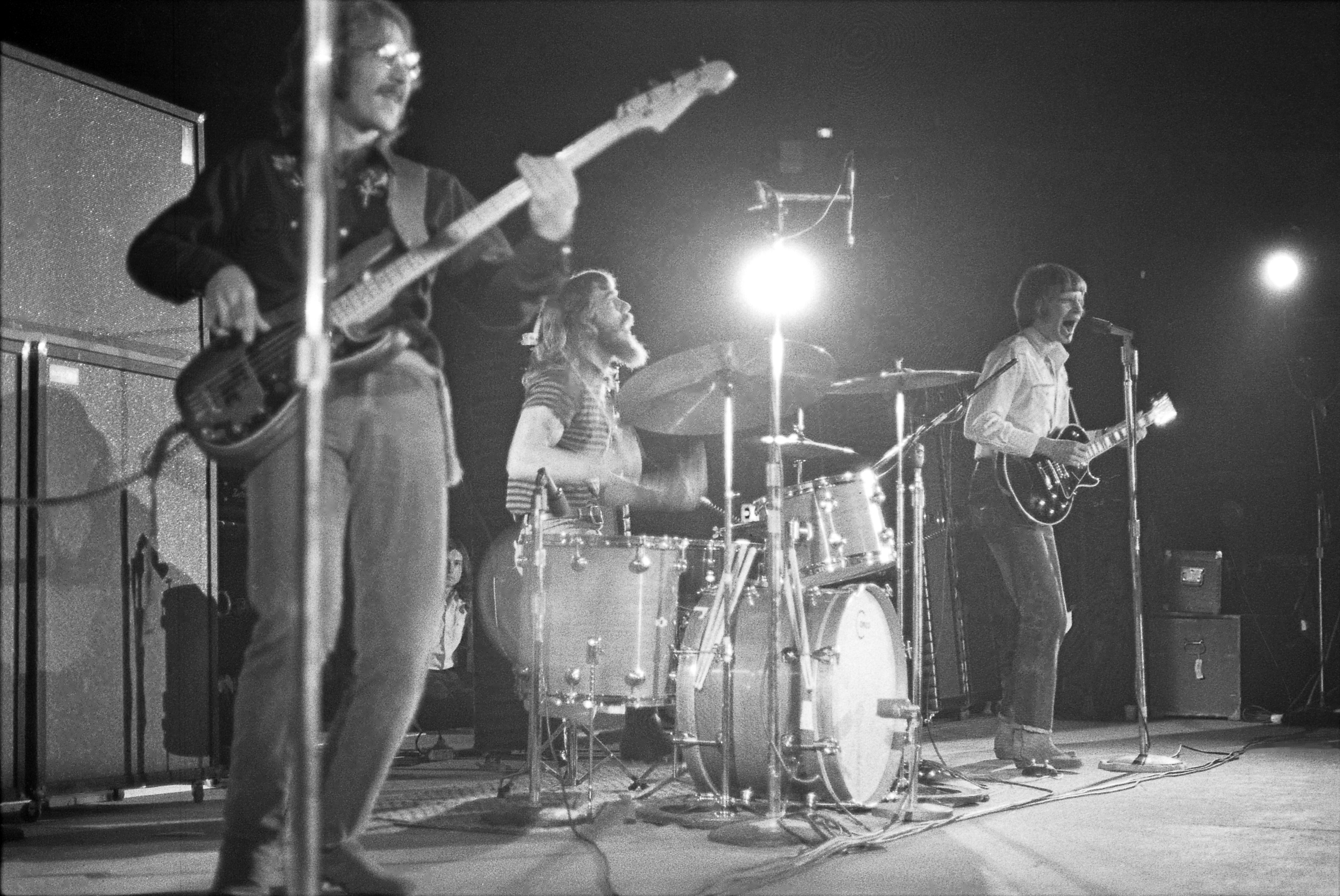
Creedence Clearwater Revival performing in December 1969

What really happened is that I used a setting like New Orleans, but I would actually be talking about things from my own life. Certainly a song like "Green River" – which you may think would fit seamlessly into the Bayou vibe, but it's actually about the Green River, as I named it – it was actually called Putah Creek by Winters, California. It wasn't called Green River, but in my mind I always sort of called it Green River. All those little anecdotes are part of my childhood, those are things that happened to me actually, I just wrote about them and the audience shifted at the time and place.

"Lodi" did not make the Top 40 but went on to become a rock radio staple and a fan favorite. It describes the plight of a down-and-out musician whose career has landed him playing a gig in the town of Lodi (pronounced "low-die"), a small agricultural city in California's Central Valley about 70 miles from Fogerty's hometown of Berkeley. After playing in local bars, the narrator finds himself stranded and unable to raise bus or train fare to leave. Fogerty later said he had never actually visited Lodi before writing the song, and simply picked it for the song because it had "the coolest sounding name." The song's chorus, "Oh Lord, stuck in Lodi again", has been the theme of several city events in Lodi.

"Commotion" has been cited as a metaphor for the social and political unrest that America was experiencing at the time. Fogerty asserted in 2012 to Uncut, "I didn’t think 'Commotion' was social commentary, ’cause all this stuff was just in the air. But I was writing about what was in the air, and that was what came out of me. I was just doing what came naturally."

Other significant tracks on the album include the lament "Wrote a Song for Everyone", which, according to the VH1 Legends episode on the group, deals with Fogerty's failing marriage, and the Ray Charles cover "The Night Time Is the Right Time", continuing the Creedence tradition of including classic R&B and early rock and roll songs on their studio albums, as they had with Dale Hawkins' "Susie Q" (1968's Creedence Clearwater Revival) and Little Richard's "Good Golly Miss Molly" (1969's Bayou Country). In 2012 Uncut called "Cross Tie Walker" "a quintessential Johnny Cash two-step with a nifty bassline and a tale about a hobo hopping a train and starting a new life." The phrase "cross tie walker" appears earlier in the album, as part of the lyrics for "Green River".

Although Fogerty was producing, arranging and writing all the songs at this point, as well as handling lead guitar and singing duties, bassist Stu Cook insisted to Bill Kopp of musoscribe.com, "We didn't always play the parts we were given. John showed us lots of stuff he wanted specifically in songs; songwriters often do that. They come up with a song, they have an arrangement they want to hear. Some things are important, and other things are less important. We had a sufficient amount of latitude in writing and arranging our parts." Although he has always maintained that the band's artistic vision was solely his own, Fogerty himself conceded to Rolling Stone's Michael Goldberg in 1993, "Probably ninety-nine percent of the tracks we did as a quartet are played live with all four guys playing at the same room. I've heard the rumor over the years that 'after they left the studio, John went in and re-recorded all the parts.' No. I think the charm of what you hear on those records is four guys really playing." However, Fogerty has always maintained that the ideas for Creedence were his; in 1998 he asserted to Harold Steinblatt of Guitar World, "Many times – in fact, most of the time – they never heard the melodies until after the record came out ... I showed the band how each part went – I showed them the music that fit the song I had written."

In March, prior to recording the album, Creedence conducted a test session at the recently built Wally Heider Studios, where they recorded three instrumental test tracks (two of which, "Broken Spoke Shuffle" and "Glory Be", are included in the 2008 remastered CD). The recording sessions for Green River lasted until June.

== Reception ==
Professional ratings
Review scores
Source	Rating
AllMusic	5/5 stars
Encyclopedia of Popular Music	5/5 stars
Rolling Stone (original)	(favorable)
Rolling Stone (reissue)	5/5 stars
Tom Hull	A−

Rolling Stone called it "a great album" with the reviewer further stating "they are now creating the most vivid American rock since Music from Big Pink". AllMusic gave the album 5 stars (out of 5) with Stephen Thomas Erlewine stating: "If anything, CCR's third album Green River represents the full flower of their classic sound initially essayed on its predecessor, Bayou Country." John Fogerty has stated many times that Green River is his favorite Creedence album, telling Tom Pinnock of Uncut in 2013, "“Green River” was my favourite song from the Creedence era, because it really had the whole Sun Records vibe to me – and the album, too."

The album was certified Gold by the RIAA on December 16, 1970; twenty years later it was certified triple Platinum on December 13, 1990.

== Legacy ==
In 2003, Green River was ranked number 95 on Rolling Stone magazine's list of the 500 greatest albums of all time, and was featured in Robert Dimery's book 1001 Albums You Must Hear Before You Die. It features three of the band's best-known songs: "Bad Moon Rising", "Lodi" and the title track. The album was remastered and reissued on 180-gram vinyl by Analogue Productions in 2006.

== Track listing ==
All tracks are written by John Fogerty, except where noted.

Side one
No.	Title	Length
1.	"Green River"	2:36
2.	"Commotion"	2:44
3.	"Tombstone Shadow"	3:39
4.	"Wrote a Song for Everyone"	4:57

Side two
No.	Title	Writer(s)	Length
1.	"Bad Moon Rising"		2:21
2.	"Lodi"		3:13
3.	"Cross-Tie Walker"		3:20
4.	"Sinister Purpose"		3:23
5.	"The Night Time Is the Right Time"	Nappy Brown, Ozzie Cadena, Lew Herman	3:09

40th Anniversary Edition CD bonus tracks
No.	Title	Length
10.	"Broken Spoke Shuffle" (instrumental)	2:39
11.	"Glory Be" (instrumental)	2:48
12.	"Bad Moon Rising" (Live in Berlin, September 16, 1971)	2:07
13.	"Green River/Suzie Q" (Live in Stockholm, September 21, 1971)	4:28
14.	"Lodi" (Live in Hamburg, September 17, 1971)	3:19

== Personnel ==
Creedence Clearwater Revival

- John Fogerty – lead and backing vocals, lead guitar, piano, keyboards, harmonica, arranger
- Tom Fogerty – rhythm guitar (all but 12–14)
- Stu Cook – bass guitar
- Doug Clifford – drums

Production

- John Fogerty, Saul Zaentz – producers
- Chris Clough – compilation producer
- Basul Parik – cover art, photography
- Russ Gary – engineer
- Larissa Collins – art direction
- Geoff Gans – reissue design
- Dave Marsh, Joel Selvin – reissue liner notes

== Charts ==
Chart performance for Green River
Chart (1969–1970)	Peak position
Canada Top Albums/CDs (RPM)	2
Dutch Albums (Album Top 100)	20
German Albums (Offizielle Top 100)	11
Finnish Albums (The Official Finnish Charts)	11
Italian Albums (Musica e Dischi)	16
Japanese Albums (Oricon)	46
Norwegian Albums (VG-lista)	5
UK Albums (Official Charts)	20
US Billboard 200	1
US Top R&B/Hip-Hop Albums (Billboard)	26

== Certifications ==
Certifications for Green River
Region	Certification	Certified units/sales
New Zealand (RMNZ)	Platinum	15,000^{‡}
United States (RIAA)	3× Platinum	3,000,000^{^}
^{^} Shipments figures based on certification alone.
