= Commotion (song) =

Single by Creedence Clearwater Revival

from the album Green River
- A-side: "Green River"
- Released: July 1969
- Recorded: Sometime from March to June 1969 at Wally Heider Studios in San Francisco, California
- Genre: Hard rock; blues rock; rockabilly; country rock
- Length: 2:43
- Label: Fantasy
- Songwriter: John Fogerty
- Producer: John Fogerty

Creedence Clearwater Revival singles chronology
"Bad Moon Rising" (1969)	"Commotion" (1969)	"Down on the Corner" (1969)

"Commotion" is a song by Creedence Clearwater Revival from the album Green River, and was also the B-side of the single release of the album's title track. In 1980, "Tombstone Shadow" b/w "Commotion'" was released as a single in the United States. While released as a B-side, "Commotion" reached No. 30 in the United States on the Billboard Hot 100 and No. 16 in Germany. It was written by John Fogerty and recorded at Wally Heider's Studios in San Francisco in June 1969. The 45 rpm was the debut session of the band at Wally Heider's and the first collaboration with engineer Russ Gary.

== Lyrics and music ==
"Commotion" portrays New York's manic side, using themes about traffic, freeways, and hurrying/rushing around within the city. John Fogerty explains: "I was writing about what was in the air, and that was what came out of me. I was just doing what came naturally." According to Fogerty the song's beat matches the beat of a train, and he "love[s] to play the train beat." He has also stated that the song is a reaction to blaring televisions and other noise of modern civilization, reflecting his preference for peace and clarity. Tampa Tribune critic Rory O'Connor referred to it as a "complaint about the hustle and hassle of the world."

Fogerty biographer Thomas Kitts describes "Commotion" as representing a "noisy, restless" world, "full of chaos and damage." According to Kitts, the singer sees "confusion, reckless energy, random movement and unhappiness" everywhere, and no one, including politicians or the church, can provide "leadership or direction." Kitts sees a similarity between the lyrics of this song and a hair spray can turned into a missile in Thomas Pynchon's The Crying of Lot 49, as both reflect commotion that may be interpreted as a trope for an upcoming apocalypse.

Kitts praised the strong foundation provided by the rhythm section of drummer Doug Clifford and bassist Stu Cook, stating that John Fogerty uses that foundation well "for a series of [guitar] riffs and solos that punctuated vocal lines and increased drama and tension.

Fogerty said of the song in 1970:

"Commotion" is something new as far as recording goes. It has a thirties big-band up-tempo style. But we don't have horns or anything. It's very fast, like "Sing, Sing, Sing." That would be one of the influences, but there are country-and-western records like that too. Jim Kweskin does stuff like it. Sounds like a train. It's about the drag of the city—a two-minute impression of New York City.

"Ramble Tamble," released on Creedence Clearwater Revival's 1970 album Cosmo's Factory, developed from parts of the working version of "Commotion."

== Reception ==
Billboard described "Commotion" as a "hard rock item with a strong lyric line." Cash Box described it as having "the kick of an early rock outing mindful of...'Suzie Q.'" Record World said it was "great." The single reached the Top 40, peaking at #30 on the Billboard Hot 100.

== Live performance ==
The band played the song regularly until their last public show in May 1972. A recording from their concert at Oakland Coliseum on January 31, 1970 was released on The Concert ten years later. A live recording of "Commotion" appears also on the Live in Europe compilation. John Fogerty played "Commotion" for the first time during his solo career on the opening leg of the Long Road Home Tour at Palais des Congrès, Paris, France, on June 28, 2006. The song survived as a regular number in his set-list until summer 2007 after which the plays became rarer.

== In popular culture ==
In 2012, "Commotion" appeared in the Parenthood episode "Everything Is Not Okay."
