= Keep On Chooglin' (song) =

1969 song by Creedence Clearwater Revival

Song by Creedence Clearwater Revival

from the album Bayou Country
- Released: January 1969
- Recorded: October 1968
- Genre: Swamp rock; blues
- Length: 7:43
- Label: Fantasy
- Songwriter: John Fogerty
- Producer: John Fogerty

"Keep On Chooglin'" is a song written by John Fogerty that was first released as the final song on Creedence Clearwater Revival's 1969 album Bayou Country. The song was often used to close Creedence Clearwater Revival concerts and was later covered by several other artists including Fogerty as a solo artist. The song popularized the neologism "chooglin'".

== Lyrics and music ==
According to John Fogerty, he began working on "Keep On Chooglin'" (as well as "Born on the Bayou" and "Proud Mary", which also appeared on Bayou Country) during his time in the US Army Reserves. He continued working on those songs after his discharge and throughout most of 1968, during which time he came up with the idea to cross-reference the songs as part of a "swamp bayou myth".

John Fogerty biographer Thomas M. Kitts describes "Keep On Chooglin'" as "an energetic rave". The song builds into a boogie as John Fogerty plays variations on the opening guitar riff and incorporates solos on his harmonica. John Fogerty claims that some of his guitar playing on "Keep on Chooglin'" is based on the playing of Charlie Christian. Kitts describes Doug Clifford's drums as "pounding", Stu Cook's bass guitar as "thumping" and Tom Fogerty's rhythm guitar chords as "slashing". Music writer Steven L. Hamelman praises Clifford's drumming on the song as "a brilliant groove, never wavering".

The song popularized the term "chooglin', which may have been invented by Fogerty. The lyrics tell the listener that he or she should "keep on chooglin'". John Fogerty explained the term chooglin' as "what happens when 'you got to ball and have a good time.'" Similar to Fogerty's explanation, Cook viewed chooglin' as a metaphor for sex. Lyrics of the song such as "Here comes Louie, works in the sewer, he gonna choogle tonight" imply that chooglin' is especially done by the working class, but other lyrics such as "if you can choose it, who can refuse it, y'all be chooglin' tonight" imply that everyone can choogle. Clifford described the message to keep on chooglin' as inspirational, "It means keep on going, keep on truckin'. Things may be bad and look bleak, but believe in yourself, pull up the old bootstraps and get the job done." According to Village Voice critic Robert Christgau, the verb "choogle" "has more to do with vigor than with potency, more to do with simple activity than with sexuality."

"Keep On Chooglin'" has some relationship to "Bootleg", another song from Bayou Country in that the singer appears to be a marginalized figure. The two songs also share similar riffs, and were both designed as "concert ravers". "Keep On Chooglin'" and "Bootleg" (as well as some other Creedence songs) were both used to demonstrate the similarities between different songs as part of Fogerty's defense in the lawsuit brought against him by Fantasy Records, in which Fantasy claimed that Fogerty's solo song "The Old Man Down the Road" copied the melody from "Run Through the Jungle", a song which Fantasy held the rights to. "Keep On Chooglin'" also relates to several other songs on Bayou Country as one of several songs that maintain an illusion that the band is from the Louisiana backwoods, a group that also includes "Born on the Bayou", "Proud Mary" and "Graveyard Train".

Creedence Clearwater Revival often used "Keep On Chooglin'" as their final song in live concerts. Although the album version lasted a little under 8 minutes, in concert the song could extend for more than 15 minutes. Live versions have been included on several Creedence Clearwater Revival live albums, including Live in Europe, The Concert and Live at Woodstock. as well as the final song performed live in the 2022 Netflix documentary Travelin' Band: Creedence Clearwater Revival at the Royal Albert Hall.

"Keep On Chooglin'" was included on the soundtrack of the 1980 Art Linson film Where the Buffalo Roam and on the compilation album The Long Road Home.

== Cover versions ==
John Fogerty has frequently played "Keep On Chooglin'" in his live solo concerts. Versions have been included on several of his albums, including The Long Road Home – In Concert and 50 Year Trip: Live at Red Rocks, as well as a special edition of Revival. The Hammersmith Gorillas covered "Keep On Chooglin'" on their 1999 album Gorilla Got Me. Lee Benoit covered it on his 2000 album Dis 'N' Dat.
