= Stan Lewis (record label owner) =

American record label owner (1927–2018)

- Born: Stanley Joseph Lewis; July 5, 1927; Shreveport, United States
- Died: July 15, 2018 (aged 91); Shreveport, United States
- Occupation: Record label owner
- Known for: Founder of Jewel Records

Stanley Joseph Lewis (July 5, 1927 – July 15, 2018) was an American record label owner, in Shreveport, Louisiana.

== Biography ==
Born in Shreveport, Lewis set up Stan's Music Shop there in 1948. The business eventually grew to six retail stores, a nationwide mail-order and distributor service, and multiple record labels.

Lewis distributed rhythm and blues records from independent labels including Atlantic, Chess and Specialty, and advertised his mail order business on radio stations KWKH (Shreveport, Louisiana), KAAY (Little Rock, Arkansas), and John R.'s powerful nightly show on WLAC-AM (Nashville, Tennessee). Lewis's early customers were the young Elvis Presley, Buddy Holly, and Bob Dylan.

In 1954, Lewis began to produce R&B and rock and roll records; the first was Lowell Fulson's "Reconsider Baby," released on Checker Records. In 1957, Lewis shared co-authorship of the hit song "Susie Q", with Stan's Record Shop employee Dale Hawkins; the song has been cited as a tribute to Lewis's daughter Susan. Hawkins has stated that Lewis actually had no involvement in writing the song.

In 1964, Lewis founded and began releasing records on Jewel Records, soon followed by the subsidiaries Paula and Ronn labels. Over the next twenty years, these labels issued over 1,000 releases on a variety of formats (45, LP, reel-to-reel, 8-track, cassette, compact disc) from a variety of genres (R&B, gospel, rock, pop, country, jazz, comedy). This included releases from: Fontella Bass, Buster Benton, Brady L. Blade, Blind Boys of Alabama, Blind Boys of Mississippi, Charles Brown, Carter Brothers, Bobby Charles, Jimmie Davis, Clay Evans, Clarence Fountain, C. L. Franklin, John Fred and his Playboy Band, Frank Frost, Lowell Fulson, Mickey Gilley, Peppermint Harris, John Lee Hooker, Lightnin' Hopkins, Johnny L. Jones, Pigmeat Markham, Oris Mays, Jerry McCain, Toussaint McCall, Memphis Slim, Willie Morganfield, Dorothy Norwood, Bobby Patterson, Bobby Rush, Soul Stirrers, Joe Stampley and the Uniques, Nat Stuckey, Little Johnny Taylor, Ted Taylor, Traveling Echoes, Big Joe Turner, Ike & Tina Turner, Violinaries, Justin Wilson, and Young-Holt Unlimited. The most successful release was in 1968 with "Judy in Disguise (With Glasses)" by John Fred and His Playboy Band from Baton Rouge, Louisiana.

By 1973, Lewis's business had grown so large that Billboard music magazine cited it as the largest freight user, largest telephone user, and greatest customer of the Post Office Department in this part of the nation. The work was accomplished through the help of over 200 employees. At this time, Lewis handled distribution for more than 600 record labels to other record stores. During 1972, he sold over 2.5 million singles and 470,000 albums.

In 1983, Lewis declared bankruptcy. In 1999, EMusic.com purchased the master recording rights of the Jewel family of labels, and Lewis retained his personal songwriting copyrights.

== Honours ==
Lewis received a Lifetime Achievement Award in 2003 from Offbeat magazine, was inducted into the Louisiana Music Hall of Fame in 2009, and was honored with three Stan "The Record Man" Lewis festivals hosted annually from 2014 to 2016 by the Shreveport Regional Arts Council.

He continued to live in Shreveport until his death in July 2018, aged 91.
