= Bayou Country (album) =

Studio album by Creedence Clearwater Revival
- Released: January 15, 1969
- Recorded: October 1968
- Studios: RCA (Hollywood, California)
- Genres: Swamp rock; blues rock; Americana
- Length: 33:48
- Label: Fantasy
- Producer: John Fogerty

Creedence Clearwater Revival chronology
Creedence Clearwater Revival (1968)	Bayou Country (1969)	Green River (1969)

Singles from Bayou Country
- 1. "Proud Mary" Released: January 1969

Bayou Country is the second studio album by the American rock band Creedence Clearwater Revival (CCR), released by Fantasy Records on January 15, 1969, and was the first of three albums CCR released in that year. Bayou Country reached No. 7 on the Billboard 200 chart and produced the band's first No. 2 hit single, "Proud Mary".

== Background ==
After ten years of struggling as the Blue Velvets and the Golliwogs, singer/guitarist John Fogerty, his brother guitarist Tom Fogerty, bassist Stu Cook, and drummer Doug Clifford scored a No. 11 hit single with "Susie Q" in June 1968 under the name Creedence Clearwater Revival. Their self-titled album peaked at No. 52 on the Billboard albums chart.

Despite their new-found success, however, seeds of discontent among the four members had already been planted due to John Fogerty assuming control of the band at just about every level. "There was a point at which we had done the first album. Everybody had listened to my advice. I don't think anybody thought too much about it," Fogerty recalled to Michael Goldberg of Rolling Stone in 1993. "But in making the second album, Bayou Country, we had a real confrontation. Everybody wanted to sing, write, make up their own arrangements, whatever, right? This was after ten years of struggling. Now we had the spotlight. Andy Warhol's fifteen minutes of fame. 'Susie Q' was as big as we'd ever seen. Of course, it really wasn't that big...I didn't want to go back to the carwash."

In 2007, the singer elaborated to Joshua Klein of Pitchfork, "I determined, we're on the tiniest record label in the world, there's no money behind us, we don't have a manager, there's no publicist. We basically had none of the usual star-making machinery, so I said to myself I'm just going to have to do it with the music...Basically I wanted to do what the Beatles had done. I sensed that I just had to do it myself."

== Songwriting ==
Bayou Country contains one of John Fogerty's most heralded songs, "Proud Mary", which peaked at No. 2 on the singles chart. In a 1969 interview, Fogerty said that he wrote it in the two days after he was discharged from the National Guard. In the liner notes for the 2008 expanded reissue of Bayou Country, Joel Selvin explained that the riffs for "Proud Mary", "Born on the Bayou", and "Keep on Chooglin'" were conceived by Fogerty at a concert in the Avalon Ballroom, and "Proud Mary" was arranged from parts of different songs, one of which was about a "washerwoman named Mary". The line "Left a good job in the city" was written following Fogerty's discharge from the National Guard, and the line "rollin' on the river" was from a movie by Will Rogers. In the Macintosh program "Garage Band", Fogerty explained that he liked Beethoven's Fifth Symphony, and wanted to open a song with a similar intro, referring to the way "Proud Mary" opens with the repeated C chord to A chord. In 1998, Fogerty admitted to Harold Steinblatt of Guitar World that he knew the composition was "my first really good song. I was 23 years old, I believe, and I'd been kind of playing at music for 10 years. But I recognized the importance of 'Proud Mary' immediately." In the same interview, Fogerty stated that the guitar solo was "me trying to be Steve Cropper," the guitarist from Booker T. & the M.G.s. The song was acclaimed almost immediately, with Solomon Burke scoring a minor hit with it in 1969 and a radically rearranged version appearing on Ike and Tina Turner's 1971 LP Workin' Together. Bob Dylan told Rolling Stone in a 1969 interview that it was his favorite song of the year. In 2012, Fogerty recalled to Uncut's David Cavanagh that he was extremely focused at the time, honing his songwriting with a single-mindedness that led to a proficient string of hits:

I would sit in my little apartment - which was very sparse - and stare at the wall. That's how I wrote. I would stare at it all night. There was nothing hanging on the wall, because I didn't have any money for paintings. It was just a beige wall. It was a blank slate, a blank canvas. But it was also exciting. I could go anywhere and do anything because I was a writer. I was conjuring that place deep in my soul that was me.

The swampy album opener "Born on the Bayou" was conceived in the same setting, with Fogerty explaining to Lynne Margolis of American Songwriter in 2013:

And it’s the middle of the night, I’m looking at my blank wall and basically going into another dimension — whatever you do when you’re kind of meditating — and that whole sound, that ringing, the way my amp sounded was takin’ me in there, and right at that moment, I don’t know if I’d written it first on a piece of paper, but it collided in my brain with the phrase, born on the bayou... And I pulled everything I knew about it, which wasn’t much because I didn’t live there. It was all through media. I loved an old movie called Swamp Fever...every other bit of southern bayou information that had entered my imagination from the time I was born, it all sort of collided in that meditation about that song. And I knew that that sound and that story went together. I can’t tell you why.

In 1970, Fogerty told Pop Chronicles, "'Born on the Bayou' was vaguely like 'Porterville,' about a mythical childhood and a heat-filled time, the Fourth of July. I put it in the swamp where, of course, I had never lived...'Chasing down a hoodoo.' Hoodoo is a magical, mystical, spiritual, non-defined apparition, like a ghost or a shadow, not necessarily evil, but certainly other-worldly. I was getting some of that imagery from Howlin' Wolf and Muddy Waters." In an interview with Jeb Wright on the Classic Rock Revisited website, Clifford cited "Born on the Bayou" as his favorite Creedence song, stating, "The favorite song that we ever did, for me, was 'Born on the Bayou.' Still, when I hear that song I go, 'That’s me playing on that.' It is a weird thing. It was greasy and we were right out of the clubs. That song had so much soul in it." Although not a concept album, Fogerty did acknowledge to Rolling Stone in 1993 that "Born on the Bayou" "is almost the Gordian knot or the key to what happened later. As I was writing it, it occurred to me that there was more power than just this one song. If there was a way to tie it all together on one album, kind of cross-fertilize, cross-relate the songs, you would have a much more interesting and maybe more powerful image. So that's what happened. 'Born on the Bayou' sort of relates to 'Proud Mary.' It certainly relates to 'Keep on Chooglin' and 'Graveyard Train.'"

Some of the other Creedence members have taken exception to the notion that Fogerty was the sole creative force in the band, with Doug Clifford telling Gary James of classicbands.com, "We all jammed every day when we weren't on the road and actually when we were on the road. We'd play acoustically at night. Three to four hours every night we would work the songs out or songs would come out of that song pool. The rest of us didn't get any credit for anything that came out of it. That's okay. I'm not crying over spilled milk, but when you really look at how prolific John was in the 3½ years that we had our success and the major drought he's had as a solo artist, I think it adds a little more credence...to what we contributed to the band." The atmosphere behind the scenes was indeed worsening; in a 2012 article with Uncut's Tom Pinnock, Fogerty recalled, "We went into RCA in Hollywood, Studio A, to record Bayou Country in October. We had the music for “Proud Mary” recorded, and I knew what I wanted the backgrounds to sound like. I showed the other guys how to sing the backgrounds, having remembered what we'd sounded like on “Porterville”, which was very ragged, not melodious...And I heard our tape back, and I just went, “Nahhh, that’s not gonna work.” So we had a big fight over that...We literally coulda broke up right there."

In addition to the Fogerty originals, Bayou Country also features a version of Little Richard's "Good Golly Miss Molly" with slightly changed lyrics; instead of the result of the gift of a diamond ring being, "When she hugs me, her kissin' make me ting-a-ling-a-ling," John Fogerty sang, "Would you pardon me a kissin' and a ting-a-ling-a-ling?" "Keep On Chooglin'", laced with sexual innuendo, would become a concert show-stopper for the band.

== Reception ==
Professional ratings
Review scores
Source	Rating
AllMusic	4.5/5 stars
Encyclopedia of Popular Music	4/5 stars
Rolling Stone (reissue)	3.5/5 stars

In an early review, Rolling Stone thought that the album suffered from a major fault of inconsistency. "The good cuts are very good; but the bad ones just don't make it," it said. The review was positive on the title track "Born on the Bayou" and "Proud Mary", but thought many of the other tracks lacked originality. Overall it considered the material in the album "not always strong, but Creedence Clearwater Revival plays with enough gusto to overcome this problem." For its 40th-anniversary reissue in 2008, the album was given a score of 3.5 stars out of 5.

On AllMusic the album received 4.5 stars (out of 5), with Stephen Thomas Erlewine stating: "Opening slowly with the dark, swampy "Born on the Bayou", Bayou Country reveals an assured Creedence Clearwater Revival, a band that has found its voice between their first and second album. It's not just that "Born on the Bayou" announces that CCR has discovered its sound—it reveals the extent of John Fogerty's myth-making."

The album was included in the book 1001 Albums You Must Hear Before You Die.

The album was first certified Gold by the RIAA on December 16, 1970, then double Platinum on December 13, 1990.

== Track listing ==
All tracks are written by John Fogerty, except where noted.

Side one
No.	Title	Length
1.	"Born on the Bayou"	5:13
2.	"Bootleg"	3:03
3.	"Graveyard Train"	8:37

Side two
No.	Title	Writer(s)	Length
1.	"Good Golly, Miss Molly"	Robert Blackwell, John Marascalco	2:44
2.	"Penthouse Pauper"		3:39
3.	"Proud Mary"		3:09
4.	"Keep On Chooglin'"		7:43

40th Anniversary Edition CD bonus tracks
No.	Title	Length
8.	"Bootleg" (alternate take)	5:48
9.	"Born on the Bayou" (live at Royal Albert Hall in London, September 28, 1971)	4:48
10.	"Proud Mary" (live in Stockholm, September 21, 1971)	2:51
11.	"Crazy Otto" (live recording by KSAN at the Fillmore, San Francisco, March 14, 1969)	8:48

== Personnel ==
Creedence Clearwater Revival

- John Fogerty – lead and backing vocals, lead guitar, harmonica, piano, percussion
- Tom Fogerty – rhythm guitar (all but 9, 10), backing vocals
- Stu Cook – bass guitar
- Doug Clifford – drums

Production

- John Fogerty – producer, arranger
- Chris Clough – compilation producer
- George Horn – remastering
- Basul Parik – cover art
- Hank McGill – engineer
- Joel Selvin – liner notes

== Charts ==
Chart performance for Bayou Country
Chart (1969–1970)	Peak position
Canada Top Albums/CDs (RPM)	14
German Albums (Offizielle Top 100)	33
Japanese Albums (Oricon)	93
UK Albums (Official Charts)	62
US Billboard 200	7
US Top R&B/Hip-Hop Albums (Billboard)	41

== Certifications ==
Certifications for Bayou Country
Region	Certification	Certified units/sales
New Zealand (RMNZ)	Gold	7,500^{‡}
United States (RIAA)	2× Platinum	2,000,000^{^}
^{^} Shipments figures based on certification alone.^{‡} Sales+streaming figures based on certification alone.

== Release history ==
Release history and formats for Bayou Country
Region	Date	Label	Format	Catalog
North America	January 1969	Fantasy	LP	8387
United Kingdom	July 1969	Liberty	LP	LBS 83261
Germany	1969	Bellaphon	LP	BLPS 19002
United Kingdom	March 1973	Fantasy	LP	FT 507
North America	1983	Fantasy	LP	ORC-4513
United Kingdom	July 1984	Fantasy	LP	FAS LP 5003
United Kingdom	July 1984	Fantasy	Cassette	FAS K 5003
United Kingdom	August 1987	Fantasy	LP	FACE 502
United Kingdom	August 1987	Fantasy	Cassette	FACC 502
United Kingdom	August 1987	Fantasy	CD	CDEF 502
North America	1988	Fantasy	Cassette	54513
North America	1988	Fantasy	CD	FCD-4513-2
North America	June 10, 2008	Fantasy	expanded CD	FAN-30877-02
