= Cotton Fields =

US blues song

"Cotton Fields (The Cotton Song)" (also known as "In Them Old Cotton Fields Back Home") is a song written by American blues musician Huddie Ledbetter, better known as Lead Belly, who made the first recording of the song in 1940.

== Early versions ==
Recorded by Lead Belly in 1940, "Cotton Fields" was introduced into the canon of folk music by its inclusion on the 1954 album Odetta & Larry which comprised performances by Odetta at the Tin Angel nightclub in San Francisco with instrumental and vocal accompaniment by Lawrence Mohr. That version was entitled "Old Cotton Fields at Home".

The song's profile was boosted by its recording by Harry Belafonte, first on his 1958 album Belafonte Sings the Blues, and then a live version on the 1959 concert album Belafonte at Carnegie Hall. Belafonte had learned "Cotton Fields" from Odetta and had been singing it in concert from as early as 1955. A #13 hit in 1961 for The Highwaymen, "Cotton Fields" served as an album track for a number of C&W and folk-rock acts including Ferlin Husky (The Heart and Soul of Ferlin Husky 1963), The Delltones (Come A Little Bit Closer 1963), Buck Owens (On the Bandstand 1963), the New Christy Minstrels (Chim-Chim-Cheree 1965) and the Seekers (Roving With The Seekers 1964).

Odetta also made a new studio recording of the song for her 1963 album One Grain of Sand. The Springfields included "Cotton Fields" on a 1962 EP release, and that version is featured on the CD On an Island of Dreams: The Best of the Springfields. "Cotton Fields" was also recorded by Unit 4+2 for their Concrete and Clay album (1965). A rendering in French, "L'enfant do", was recorded in 1962 by Hugues Aufray and Petula Clark.

== The Beach Boys cover ==
"Cottonfields"

Single by the Beach Boys

from the album 20/20
- B-side: "The Nearest Faraway Place"
- Released: April 20, 1970
- Recorded: November 18–19, 1968 (album version); August 8 & 15, 1969 (single version)
- Length: 2:21 (album version); 3:05 (single version)
- Label: Capitol
- Songwriter: Huddie Ledbetter
- Producers: Brian Wilson; Al Jardine; (album); The Beach Boys (single)

The Beach Boys singles chronology
"Add Some Music to Your Day" (1970)	"Cottonfields" (1970)	"Slip on Through" (1970)

Licensed audio
- "Cotton Fields (The Cotton Song)" on YouTube

American rock band the Beach Boys first recorded "Cottonfields" on November 18–19, 1968. The track, with Al Jardine on lead vocals, debuted on the group's 1969 album 20/20. It was Jardine's idea that the cover the song. He explained:

I first heard [the song] in the mid-'50s. I loved Lead Belly's vocals and of course his 12-string guitar sound but it was really his heartfelt emotional lyrics written during the Great Depression that affected me. I was determined to record a new version for the Beach Boys at a time when we were going off in quite a few different musical directions.

Dissatisfied with Brian Wilson's baroque pop-influenced arrangement of the song, Jardine persuaded the group to record a new version in August 1969, inspired by the contemporaneous vogue for country rock, as exemplified by such acts as the Flying Burrito Brothers, Stone Poneys and Michael Nesmith & the First National Band.

The re-recording featured notable session musician and long-time Nesmith collaborator Orville "Red" Rhodes on pedal steel guitar. Retitled "Cottonfields", the second version a gave the Beach Boys their greatest international success, while also marking the end of the group's hit-making career in the US, although they would enjoy periodic comebacks there. "Cottonfields" was the final Beach Boys' single released by Capitol Records, the group's label since May 1962, and their last single released in mono.

While under-performing in the U.S., peaking at No. 103 in Billboard despite a promotional appearance on the short-lived variety show Something Else, the song succeeded across the Atlantic, reaching No. 5 in the UK Singles Chart and No. 2 on the Melody Maker chart and was later listed as the tenth-biggest seller of the year by the New Musical Express. Outside of North America, it nearly achieved the success of "Do It Again", peaking at No. 1 in Australia and Norway, No. 2 in Denmark, South Africa and Sweden, No. 3 in Ireland, No. 12 in the Netherlands, No. 13 in New Zealand, and No. 29 in West Germany. Because of its popularity, it was included in the international release of the group's Sunflower album. The single achieved sales of over 50,000 copies in Australia, being eligible for a Gold Disc.

The single was initially issued only in mono, although a reprocessed stereo mix opened international issues of the Sunflower album. The track was remixed into stereo for the 2001 compilation Hawthorne, CA. A further stereo remix, found on the Feel Flows box set, opens with Al Jardine's son trying to count off the song with the help of his father. Unlike the older stereo mix, that version recreates the reverb effect on the opening vocals.

=== Chart history ===
Chart (1970)	Peak position
Australia (Go-Set)	1
Australia (Kent Music Report)	1
Denmark (IFPI)	2
Finland (Suomen virallinen lista)	21
Germany (GfK)	29
Ireland (IRMA)	3
Netherlands (Dutch Top 40)	12
Netherlands (Single Top 100)	13
New Zealand (Listener)	13
Norway (VG-lista)	1
Rhodesia (Lyons Maid)	5
South Africa (Springbok)	2
Sweden (Kvällstoppen)	2
UK Singles (Official Charts)	5
UK Melody Maker Pop 30	2
UK New Musical Express Top 30	3
US Bubbling Under the Hot 100 (Billboard)	103
US Cash Box Top 100	101
US Record World Top 100	95

=== Personnel ===
Sourced from Craig Slowinski, and 20/20 liner notes.

==== Album version ====
The Beach Boys

- Al Jardine – lead vocals, banjo, producer
- Brian Wilson – backing vocals, piano, Rhodes piano, producer, arrangement

Additional personnel

- Hal Blaine – drums
- Ed Carter – guitar, electric bass
- Steve Desper – engineer
- Lyle Ritz – upright bass
- Bill Peterson, Virgil Evans, Roy Caton – horns
- Al Vescovo – banjo, guitar

==== Single version ====
The Beach Boys

- Al Jardine – lead vocals, guitar, producer, arrangement
- Bruce Johnston – keyboards
- Mike Love - vocals
- Brian Wilson – vocals
- Carl Wilson – guitar
- Dennis Wilson – drums

Additional personnel

- Frank Capp – percussion
- Ed Carter – bass
- Daryl Dragon – keyboards
- Orville "Red" Rhodes – pedal steel guitar
- Bill Peterson, Fred Koyen, David Edwards, Ernie Small – horns
- The Beach Boys – producer

== Creedence Clearwater Revival cover ==
"Cotton Fields"

Single by Creedence Clearwater Revival

from the album Willy and the Poor Boys
- B-side: "Lodi"
- Released: 1969 (1981 as a single)
- Recorded: 1969
- Genre: Roots rock; Southern rock; country rock
- Length: 2:57
- Songwriter: Huddie Ledbetter

Creedence Clearwater Revival included their cover of "Cotton Fields" as the third track on their 1969 album Willy and the Poor Boys. Their version hit No. 1 in Mexico in 1970.

The song was later re-released as a single from the 1981 compilation Creedence Country, with "Lodi" as a B-side; this release provided the band with their only charting song on the Billboard country charts, peaking at #50.

=== Certifications ===
Certifications for "Cotton Fields"
Region	Certification	Certified units/sales
New Zealand (RMNZ)	Gold	15,000^{‡}
^{‡} Sales+streaming figures based on certification alone.

== Other covers ==
- Bill Monroe 1962, Decca Records DL4266
- In 1962, The Highwaymen recorded their version, which peaked at #13 on the US Hot 100 and #3 on the Easy Listening chart.
- The Angels in 1963 that went to No. 119 in the US
- Esther & Abi Ofarim performed "Cotton Fields" live on television in 1963 and 1969. They recorded a German version, "Wenn ich bei Dir sein kann", in 1964, which reached the Top 10 in West Berlin.
- The Pogues on their album Peace and Love (1989), with adapted lyrics

== Lyrics ==
The original lyrics, written by Lead Belly, state that the fields are "down in Louisiana, just ten miles from Texarkana". Later versions (e.g., Creedence Clearwater Revival's) say the fields are "down in Louisiana, just about a mile from Texarkana". While the twin cities of Texarkana (in Texas and in Arkansas) are about 30 miles (48 km) north of the Arkansas–Louisiana border, the larger Texarkana metropolitan area directly abuts the Arkansas-Louisiana state line.
