= Good Golly, Miss Molly =

1958 single by Little Richard

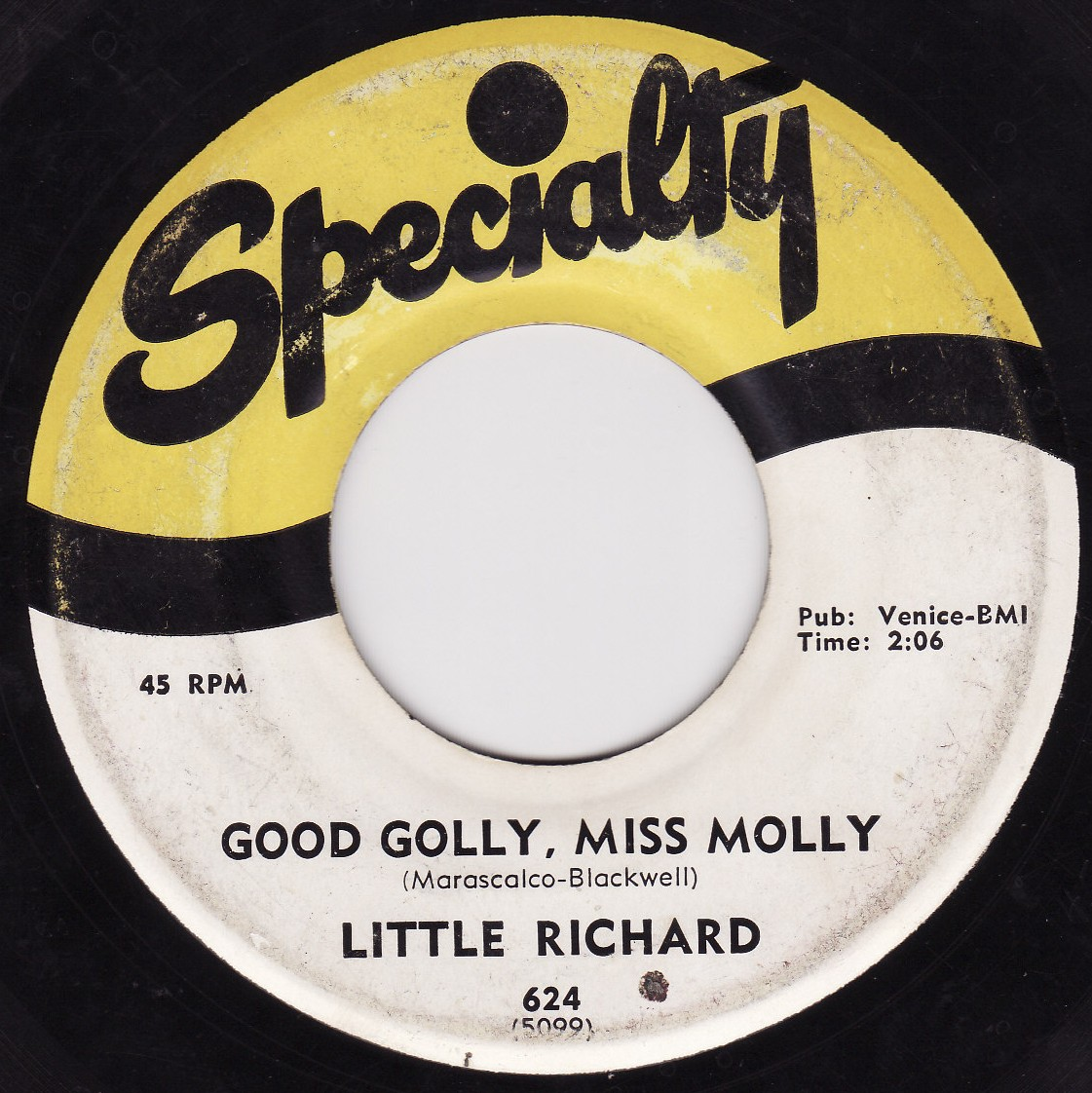

Single by Little Richard

from the album Little Richard
- B-side: "Hey-Hey-Hey-Hey"
- Released: January 1958
- Recorded: October 15, 1956
- Studio: J&M (New Orleans, Louisiana)
- Genre: Rock and roll
- Length: 2:04
- Label: Specialty (Cat. no. 624)
- Songwriters: John Marascalco, Robert "Bumps" Blackwell
- Producer: Robert "Bumps" Blackwell

Little Richard singles chronology
"Keep A-Knockin'" (1957)	"Good Golly, Miss Molly" (1958)	"Ooh! My Soul" (1958)

"Good Golly, Miss Molly" is a rock 'n' roll song first recorded in 1956 by American musician Little Richard and released in January 1958 as Specialty single 624, and later on Little Richard in March 1958. The song, a jump blues, was written by John Marascalco and producer Robert "Bumps" Blackwell. Although it was first recorded by Little Richard, Blackwell produced another version by the Valiants, who imitated the fast first version recorded by Little Richard, not released at that time. Although the Valiants' version was released first (in 1957), Little Richard had the hit, reaching No. 4. In Canada it reached No. 8. Like all his early hits, it quickly became a rock 'n' roll standard and has subsequently been recorded by hundreds of artists. The song is ranked No. 92 on the Rolling Stone magazine's list of the 500 Greatest Songs of All Time.

== Song origin ==
Little Richard first heard the phrase "Good golly, Miss Molly" from a Southern DJ named Jimmy Pennick. He modified the lyrics into the more suggestive "Good golly, Miss Molly/You sure like to ball." Little Richard himself later claimed that he took Ike Turner's piano intro from his influential 1951 rock and roll song "Rocket 88", and used it for "Good Golly, Miss Molly". "I always liked that record," Richard recalled, "and I used to use the riff in my act, so when we were looking for a lead-in to 'Good Golly, Miss Molly', I did that and it fit."

== Little Richard Specialty recording sessions ==
=== July 30, 1956: J&M Studio, New Orleans ===
Supervised by Bumps Blackwell. Personnel:

- Little Richard – vocal, piano with:
- Lee Allen – tenor saxophone
- Alvin "Red" Tyler – baritone saxophone
- Roy Eustis Montrell – guitar
- Frank Fields – leader, bass
- Earl Palmer – drums

One take and one false start from this session were released in 1989 on Little Richard Specialty Sessions (Ace Records sets) as fast versions.

=== October 15, 1956: J&M Studio, New Orleans ===
Supervised by Art Rupe. Personnel:

- Little Richard – vocal, piano with:
- Lee Allen – tenor saxophone
- Alvin Tyler – baritone saxophone
- Roy Eustis Montrell – guitar
- Frank Fields – bass
- Earl Palmer – leader, drums

At least ten takes were recorded. Take 9 was selected as master for single and album of 1958. Three other takes were released in 1989 on Little Richard Specialty Sessions (Ace Records sets).

== Little Richard later studio recording sessions ==
After leaving Specialty Records Little Richard returned to "Good Golly, Miss Molly" many times. In particular, he recorded this song:

- Circa December 1964 for Vee-Jay Records, released on Little Richard's Greatest Hits
- In December 1965 for Modern Records, released on The Wild and Frantic Little Richard
- On January 25, 1967 for Okeh Records, released on Little Richard's Greatest Hits: Recorded Live!
- In May 1970, private recording made at the Boston Tea Party, was officially released by Shout! Records, in the 2000s.
- Circa late 1972 for the film Let the Good Times Roll, released by Bell Records circa May 1973 as single Bell-1780 without flip and on double LP Let the Good Times Roll (Original Soundtrack)
- In August 1976 for K-tel International, released on Little Richard Live
- 1991 on polygram records for the movie King Ralph, with Ringo Starr on drums. The piano Richard used during that session was a Yamaha U3 equipped with a mandolin rail. The mandolin rail was not used.

These are studio recordings.

== Other versions ==
In November 1962 Jerry Lee Lewis released the single "Good Golly Miss Molly" (Sun 382), reissued on compilation album Breathless (1967) and on Rockin' Rhythm & Blues (1969).

In 1964 The Swinging Blue Jeans covered the song. It was a hit as part of the British Invasion and one of the band's best known songs. It reached No. 11 in the UK, No. 6 in the Netherlands, No. 12 in Canada, and No. 43 on Billboard Hot 100.

A cover of the song appeared as the closing track of the Sonics' 1965 debut album Here Are The Sonics.

In 1966, Mitch Ryder and the Detroit Wheels incorporated "Good Golly Miss Molly" into their version of "Devil with a Blue Dress On". Their version scored a major hit, not only in Ryder's native Detroit, but nationwide, placing at No. 4 on the Billboard Top 100, and reaching No. 5 in Canada.

Creedence Clearwater Revival recorded the song in 1969 on their Bayou Country album with slightly changed lyrics.

In the Spanish-language, one of the most popular adaptations of the song is "La Plaga", performed by Los Teen Tops in 1959, with Enrique Guzmán as the lead vocalist. Nearly three decades later, his daughter, Alejandra Guzmán, released her own version of her father's rendition as her debut single in 1988.

Bruce Springsteen's version of the song was part of the No Nukes concert album in 1980, and he has performed it regularly in concert from the 1970s to the present as part of his Detroit Medley.

Pioneering alternative rock trio Meat Puppets recorded a version of the song as the closing track for their 1986 EP Out My Way.

The song was also featured in the 1991 film King Ralph, in which Ralph (John Goodman) sings this after playing a (harpsichord).
