= Green River (song) =

1969 single by Creedence Clearwater Revival

Single by Creedence Clearwater Revival

from the album Green River
- B-side: "Commotion"
- Released: July 1969
- Recorded: Between March and June 1969
- Studio: Wally Heider, San Francisco
- Genre: Swamp rock; Southern rock; roots rock
- Length: 2:36
- Label: Fantasy
- Songwriter: John Fogerty
- Producer: John Fogerty

Creedence Clearwater Revival singles chronology
"Bad Moon Rising" (1969)	"Green River" (1969)	"Down on the Corner" (1969)

Music video
- "Green River" (lyric video) on YouTube

"Green River" is a song by American rock band Creedence Clearwater Revival. It was written by John Fogerty and released as a single in July 1969, one month before the album of the same name was released. "Green River" peaked at number two for one week, and was ranked by Billboard as the No. 31 song of 1969.

== Background ==
The song was based on a childhood vacation spot of John Fogerty's. In an interview Fogerty gave to Rolling Stone in 2012, Fogerty stated:

What really happened is that I used a setting like New Orleans, but I would actually be talking about a thing from my own life. Certainly a song like "Green River" – which you may think would fit seamlessly into the Bayou vibe, but it's actually about the Green River, as I named it – it was actually called Putah Creek by Winters, California. It wasn't called Green River, but in my mind I always sort of called it Green River. All those little anecdotes are part of my childhood, those are things that happened to me actually, I just wrote about them and the audience shifted at the time and place.

Fogerty added that the "actual specific reference, 'Green River,' I got from a soda pop-syrup label... My flavor was called Green River."

Although the song seems to be mostly about idyllic memories, in the last verse a character named Old Cody Junior warns the singer that he's going to find the world smoldering but can always come back to Green River. The name Old Cody Junior was a reference to the fact that Buffalo Bill Cody had owned the cabin by the creek that inspired the song.

As to the music, Fogerty said that:

"Green River" is obviously a tip of the hat to the Sun Records sound, but I can't think of any real specific song. Actually, with the loping beat of the acoustic guitar and then the bass kind of doing that rocking beat on the one and the four, I tend to think of something like "Dream Baby" by Roy Orbison. Yet "Green River" was much more rocking than that song, but the rhythm treatment fit."

== Reception ==
Billboard described the single as "a driving rocker in the same vein as" Creedence Clearwater Revival's previous single "Bad Moon Rising." Cash Box described it as developing "the bayou-rock style of the CCR in a slower than 'Bad Moon Rising' track that could steal the spotlight." Cash Box ranked it as the No. 19 single of 1969. Record World said it was "great." Ultimate Classic Rock critic Cliff M. Junior rated "Green River" as Creedence Clearwater Revival's 7th greatest song.

== Sales and airplay ==
"Green River" was certified gold (500,000 units sold) by the Recording Industry Association of America on December 13, 1990.

Chart (1969)	Peak position
Austria (Ö3 Austria Top 40)	5
Canada (RPM)	5
West Germany (GfK)	8
New Zealand (Listener)	11
UK Singles (Official Charts)	19
US Billboard Hot 100	2

== Certifications ==
Certifications
Region	Certification	Certified units/sales
New Zealand (RMNZ)	Platinum	30,000^{‡}
United States (RIAA)	Platinum	1,000,000^{‡}
^{‡} Sales+streaming figures based on certification alone.

== See also ==
- 1969 in music
- Creedence Clearwater Revival discography
- Roots rock
