= Dale Hawkins =

American rockabilly singer and guitarist (1936–2010)

- Born: Delmar Allen Hawkins; August 22, 1936; Goldmine Plantation
- Died: February 13, 2010 (aged 73) Little Rock, Arkansas, U.S.
- Genres: Rockabilly; rock and roll; swamp rock
- Years active: 1950s–2010
- Labels: Chess (Checker), London

Delmar Allen "Dale" Hawkins (August 22, 1936 – February 13, 2010) was a pioneer American rock singer, songwriter, and rhythm guitarist who was often called the architect of swamp rock boogie.

== Background ==
Hawkins was born in Goldmine Plantation in Richland Parish, Louisiana, and while in his early teens moved with his family to Bossier City. He began recording in 1956. In 1957, Hawkins was playing at Shreveport, Louisiana clubs, and although his music was influenced by the new rock and roll style of Elvis Presley and the guitar sounds of Scotty Moore, Hawkins blended that with the uniquely heavy blues sound of black Louisiana artists for his recording of his swamp-rock classic, "Susie Q." Fellow Louisiana guitarist and future Rock and Roll Hall of Famer James Burton provided the signature riff and solo; this was also guitarist Joe Osborn's introduction to recording.

The song was chosen as one of The Rock and Roll Hall of Fame's 500 Songs that Shaped Rock and Roll. An accompanying album, Oh! Suzy Q was released in 1958. Creedence Clearwater Revival's version of the song on their 1968 debut album helped launch their career and today it is probably the best-known version.

In 1958 Hawkins recorded a single of Willie Dixon's "My Babe" at the Chess Records studio in Chicago, featuring Telecaster guitarist Roy Buchanan. He went on to a long and successful career. He recorded more songs for Chess into the early 1960s. However, his career was not limited to recording or performing. He hosted a teen dance party, The Dale Hawkins Show, on WCAU-TV in Philadelphia. He then became a record producer, and found success with The Uniques' "Not Too Long Ago," the Five Americans' "Western Union," and Bruce Channel's "Hey! Baby". In 1998, Ace Records issued a compilation album, Dale Hawkins, Rock 'n' Roll Tornado, which contained a collection of his early works and previously unreleased material. Other recordings included his 1969 country rock album, L.A., Memphis & Tyler, Texas; and a 1999 release, Wildcat Tamer, of all-new recordings that garnered Hawkins a 4-star review in Rolling Stone.

== Career ==
Hawkins was executive vice president of Abnak Records; Vice President, Southwest Division, Bell Records (here he produced Bruce Channel, Ronnie Self, James Bell, the Festivals, the Dolls, and the Gentrys); and A&R director, RCA West Coast Rock Division, working with Michael Nesmith and Harry Nilsson.

Hawkins produced the single, "If I Could" bw "Now That It's Over", which was released on the Abnak label in November 1966. The 26 November 1966 issue of Record World had it as one of the Sleepers of the Week.

Hawkins worked with the group The Brass Buttons. He produced the single, "Before My Time" bw "I Can't Stand It", which was released on the Bell label in 1970.

In the 1990s, he produced "Goin Back to Mississippi" by R. L. Burnside's slide guitarist, Kenny Brown.

In October 2007, The Louisiana Music Hall of Fame honored Dale Hawkins for his contributions to Louisiana music by inducting him into The Louisiana Music Hall Of Fame. At the same time, he released his latest recording, "Back Down to Louisiana," inspired by a trip to his childhood home. It was recognized by the UK's music magazine, Mojo, as No. 10 in the Americana category in their 2007 Best of issue, while L.A., Memphis & Tyler, Texas was awarded No. 8 in the reissue category. Hawkins' pioneering contributions have been recognized by the Rockabilly Hall of Fame.

== Personal life ==
Arkansan and Canadian musician Ronnie Hawkins was Dale Hawkins' cousin.

In 2005, Hawkins was diagnosed with colon cancer and began chemotherapy while continuing to perform in the US and abroad. He died on February 13, 2010, from colon cancer in Little Rock, Arkansas.

== Discography ==
Studio albums

- Oh! Suzy-Q (1958)
- LA, Memphis & Tyler, Texas (1969)
- Wildcat Tamer (1999)
- Back Down To Louisiana (2007)

Live album

- Let's All Twist At The Miami Beach Peppermint Lounge (1962)
