= Lodi (song) =

- 1983 reissue label, where "Lodi" was promoted to the A-side

Single by Creedence Clearwater Revival

from the album Green River
- A-side: "Bad Moon Rising"
- Released: April 1969
- Recorded: March 1969
- Studio: Wally Heider Studios, San Francisco
- Genre: Country rock; folk rock; rockabilly; soul
- Length: 3:10
- Label: Fantasy
- Songwriter: John Fogerty
- Producer: John Fogerty

"Lodi" is a song written by John Fogerty and performed by Creedence Clearwater Revival. Recorded in March 1969, it was released in April, four months before the album, as the B-side of "Bad Moon Rising", the lead single from Green River.

== Background ==
The song describes the plight of a down-and-out musician whose career has landed him playing gigs in the town of Lodi, California. After playing in local bars, the narrator finds himself stranded and unable to raise bus or train fare to leave. John Fogerty explained the song's genesis in his autobiography:

"Lodi" was just a title for a long time. The inspiration was those trips with my dad to those small towns in central California, a place that I felt very warm and special about ... Somehow I got the idea of a traveling musician, probably a country guy, but older. A guy whose career is in the rearview mirror. The kicker is, "Oh Lord, stuck in Lodi...again!" That "Oh Lord" tells you how he feels. I was twenty-three writing this song, a very young man who'd just had a million-selling single ["Proud Mary"] all over the radio. That has nothing to do with the well you are drawing from when doing your craft.

Fogerty also said, "On 'Lodi', I saw a much older person than I was, 'cause it is sort of a tragic telling. A guy is stuck in a place where people really don't appreciate him. Since I was at the beginning of a good career, I was hoping that that wouldn't happen to me."

Fogerty later said he had never actually visited Lodi before writing the song, and simply picked it for the song because it had "the coolest sounding name." The song's chorus, "Oh Lord, stuck in Lodi again," has been the theme of several city events in Lodi.

The song's arrangement includes a key change in the final verse, emphasizing the melancholy drama of the lyric "If I only had a dollar for every song I sung..."

== Reception ==
Billboard described the single as having "an easy beat," being as powerful as its flip side "Bad Moon Rising" and as having a similar feel to Creedence Clearwater Revival's earlier single "Proud Mary." Cash Box similarly described it as "powerhouse material" that is similar to and as strong as the group's previous single "Proud Mary."

== Cover version ==
In 1969, soul singer Al Wilson released a cover of "Lodi" that peaked at No. 67 on the Billboard Hot 100 in the U.S. and No. 51 in Canada.

== Certifications ==
Certifications for "Lodi"
Region	Certification	Certified units/sales
New Zealand (RMNZ)	Gold	15,000^{‡}
United States (RIAA)	Gold	500,000^{‡}
^{‡} Sales+streaming figures based on certification alone.
