= Bad Moon Rising =

1969 song by Creedence Clearwater Revival

- 1983 reissue label, where "Bad Moon Rising" was relegated to the B-side

Single by Creedence Clearwater Revival

from the album Green River
- B-side: "Lodi"
- Released: April 16, 1969
- Recorded: March 1969
- Studio: Wally Heider, San Francisco, California
- Genre: Swamp rock; rockabilly; blues rock
- Length: 2:21
- Label: Fantasy
- Songwriter: John Fogerty
- Producer: John Fogerty

Creedence Clearwater Revival singles chronology
"Proud Mary" (1969)	"Bad Moon Rising" (1969)	"Green River" (1969)

Music video
- "Bad Moon Rising" (lyric video) on YouTube

"Bad Moon Rising" is a song written by John Fogerty and performed by Creedence Clearwater Revival. It was the lead single from their album Green River and was released on April 16, 1969, four months before the album. The song peaked at No. 2 on the Billboard Hot 100 chart on June 28, 1969, and reached No. 1 on the UK Singles Chart for three weeks in September of that year. It was CCR's second Gold single.

In 2010, Rolling Stone ranked it No. 364 on its "500 Greatest Songs of All Time" list.

On John Fogerty's 2013 album Wrote a Song for Everyone, the song is included featuring the Zac Brown Band.

== Composition ==
"Bad Moon Rising" uses weather imagery to make the point that something bad is lurking "out there."

Fogerty reportedly wrote the song after watching the 1941 film The Devil and Daniel Webster. It was inspired by a scene in the film in which a hurricane destroys the crops of several farms, but spares those of Jabez Stone (James Craig), the character in the film who makes a deal with the devil in exchange for wealth. Fogerty claims the song is about "the apocalypse that was going to be visited upon us". He also said that when the band was learning the song, he recognized the contrast between the apocalyptic words and the happy melody. He said "It wasn't until the band was learning the song that I realized the dichotomy. Here you've got this song with all these hurricanes and blowing and raging ruin and all that, but it's 'I see a bad moon rising.' It's a happy-sounding tune, right? It didn't bother me at the time."

== Reception ==
In 1969, the American music and entertainment magazine Billboard described the single as being "loaded with rhythm and drive" and predicted it "[couldn't] miss going right to the top." Cash Box, another contemporary music trade magazine, described it as a "blazing bayou-rock outing" that is "louder and bolder" than the group's previous single "Proud Mary." Cash Box ranked it as the No. 51 single of 1969.

Ultimate Classic Rock critic Cliff M. Junior rated "Bad Moon Rising" as Creedence Clearwater Revival's 5th greatest song, saying that "in a little more than two minutes, [Fogerty] unloads his mind and prompts you to think about what's troubling you in your life."

== Use in other media ==
In the 1981 film An American Werewolf in London, "Bad Moon Rising" plays as David nears the moment of changing into a werewolf.

The American noise rock band Sonic Youth named their 1985 studio album after the song.

The song was used in the 2007 film Mr. Woodcock.

The song is featured in the 2016 film Operation Avalanche, a movie about the faking of the Apollo 11 lunar landing.

An adapted version of the song, "Stretford End Arising", has been used for many years by fans of Manchester United in support of the team. A version was also used to celebrate the Liverpool Football Club player and Portugal international, Diogo Jota.

The song was used in the opening scene of the 2025 film Final Destination Bloodlines.

== Charts ==
=== Weekly charts ===
Weekly chart performance for "Bad Moon Rising"
Chart (1969)	Peak position
Australia (Go-Set)	3
Austria (Ö3 Austria Top 40)	8
Belgium (Ultratop 50 Flanders)	4
Belgium (Ultratip Bubbling Under Wallonia)	22
Canada Top Singles (RPM)	5
Germany (GfK)	8
Ireland (IRMA)	1
Netherlands (Dutch Top 40)	10
New Zealand (Listener)	1
Norway (VG-lista)	3
South Africa (Springbok Radio)	1
Switzerland (Schweizer Hitparade)	9
UK Singles (Official Charts)	1
US Billboard Hot 100	2
US Cash Box Hot 100	2
US Record World	1

2021 weekly chart performance for "Bad Moon Rising"
Chart (2021)	Peak position
Canada Digital Song Sales (Billboard)	13
US Digital Song Sales (Billboard)	22
US Hot Rock & Alternative Songs (Billboard)	12

2024 weekly chart performance for "Bad Moon Rising"
Chart (2024)	Peak position
Sweden Heatseeker (Sverigetopplistan)	11

=== Year-end charts ===
Year-end chart performance for "Bad Moon Rising"
Chart (1969)	Rank
Australia	31
Canada	53
US Billboard Hot 100	24
US Cash Box	51

== Certifications ==
Certifications for "Bad Moon Rising"
Region	Certification	Certified units/sales
Denmark (IFPI Danmark)	Platinum	90,000^{‡}
Germany (BVMI)	Gold	300,000^{‡}
Italy (FIMI)	Gold	50,000^{‡}
New Zealand (RMNZ)	5× Platinum	150,000^{‡}
Spain (Promusicae)	Gold	30,000^{‡}
United Kingdom (BPI)	Platinum	600,000^{‡}
United States (RIAA)	2× Platinum	2,000,000^{‡}
^{‡} Sales+streaming figures based on certification alone.
