= Born on the Bayou =

1969 song performed by Creedence Clearwater Revival

- Norwegian release picture sleeve

Single by Creedence Clearwater Revival

from the album Bayou Country
- A-side: "Proud Mary"
- Released: January 1969
- Recorded: Late 1968
- Studio: RCA (Hollywood, California)
- Genre: Swamp rock; Southern rock; rock and roll; psychedelic rock
- Length: 5:13 (album version); 3:50 (single edit)
- Label: Fantasy
- Songwriter: John Fogerty
- Producer: John Fogerty

"Born on the Bayou" (1969) is the first track on Creedence Clearwater Revival's second album, Bayou Country, released in 1969. It was released as the B-side of the single "Proud Mary" which reached No. 2 on the Billboard charts.

== Background ==
Songwriter John Fogerty set the song in the South, despite neither having lived nor having widely traveled there. He commented:

"Born on the Bayou" was vaguely like "Porterville," about a mythical childhood and a heat-filled time, the Fourth of July. I put it in the swamp where, of course, I had never lived. It was late as I was writing. I was trying to be a pure writer, no guitar in hand, visualizing and looking at the bare walls of my apartment. Tiny apartments have wonderful bare walls, especially when you can't afford to put anything on them. "Chasing down a hoodoo." Hoodoo is a magical, mystical, spiritual, non-defined apparition, like a ghost or a shadow, not necessarily evil, but certainly other-worldly. I was getting some of that imagery from Howlin' Wolf and Muddy Waters.

"Born on the Bayou" is an example of "swamp rock", a genre associated with Fogerty, Little Feat/Lowell George, the Band, J.J. Cale and Tony Joe White. The guitar setting for the intro is over-driven with amp tremolo on a slow setting; Fogerty uses a Gibson ES-175 (which was stolen from his car soon after recording this track). The song has also been described as Southern rock and rock and roll.

Creedence Clearwater Revival drummer Doug Clifford has said of the song in 1998:

My favorite record of ours is "Born on the Bayou." It's just an ass-kicker and a rolling track and, basically, where that song started was at the Shrine Auditorium in Los Angeles. The boys got all their new toys. The Kustom amps were supposed to show up that night and, by God, they did. They're out there playing with them and getting sounds, and here I am with the same set. John's out there working with feedback, sorting that out, and I was tapping here and there and they're telling me, "Be quiet," and I got tired of it and I just started out with that quarter note beat that I played on "Suzie Q" but I changed the foot pattern, and that was sort of the beginning of it. That's how it started, that feedback beginning and that quarter note beat.

According to Clifford, "Born on the Bayou" was originally supposed to be released as the A-side of the single with "Proud Mary." Clifford said of the song "I didn’t think 'Proud Mary' was that good, if you want to know the truth about it. I just didn’t like it. I liked 'Born on the Bayou' — to this day, it’s still my favorite Creedence song. It’s nasty, and I was disappointed when [the single] got flipped." Clifford added that “I must say I’ve had a change of heart over 40 years, and I love ‘Proud Mary.”

Creedence Clearwater Revival performed the song at Woodstock.

== Reception ==
Ultimate Classic Rock critic Cliff M. Junior rated "Born on the Bayou" as Creedence Clearwater Revival's 2nd greatest song, saying that "John Fogerty doesn’t just sing this ominous ode to the New Orleans area — he howls it."

== Certifications ==
Certifications for "Born on the Bayou"
Region	Certification	Certified units/sales
New Zealand (RMNZ)	Gold	15,000^{‡}
United States (RIAA)	Platinum	1,000,000^{‡}
^{‡} Sales+streaming figures based on certification alone.
