= Susie Q (song) =

1957 single by Dale Hawkins

"Susie-Q"

Single by Dale Hawkins
- B-side: "Don't Treat Me This Way"
- Released: May 1957
- Recorded: 1957
- Studio: KWKH Radio, Shreveport, Louisiana
- Genre: Rockabilly
- Length: 2:13
- Label: Checker
- Songwriters: Dale Hawkins; Robert Chaisson; Stan Lewis; Eleanor Broadwater

Dale Hawkins singles chronology
"Susie-Q" (1957)	"Baby Baby" (1957)

"Susie Q" is a rockabilly song co-written and performed by American musician Dale Hawkins released in 1957. The song was a commercial success and became a classic of the early rock and roll era, being recorded by many other performers in subsequent years.

== Original version ==
Hawkins wrote the song with bandmate Robert Chaisson, but when released, Stan Lewis, the owner of Jewel/Paula Records and whose daughter Susan was the inspiration for the song, and Eleanor Broadwater, the wife of Nashville DJ Gene Nobles, were credited as co-writers to give them shares of the royalties.

Hawkins cut "Susie Q" at the KWKH Radio station in Shreveport, Louisiana. "Susie Q" was a late rockabilly song which captured the spirit of Louisiana and featured guitar work by James Burton, who later worked with Ricky Nelson and Elvis Presley, among others. Burton has stated on multiple occasions, including on a talk show hosted by former Governor of Arkansas Mike Huckabee, that he composed the music to "Susie Q," initially as an instrumental, but was not given a co-writing credit or share of the publishing. The drums were played by Stan Lewis’ fifteen-year-old brother Ronnie. Sonny Trammell played electric bass, one of the first musicians to play an electric bass on a rockabilly record.

Sometime after the recording, the master tape of "Susie Q" was sold to Checker Records in Chicago, which released it as a 45 RPM single in May 1957. The single peaked at numbers 7 and 27 on Billboard magazine's Hot R&B Sides and Hot 100 charts, respectively. In Canada, the song reached number 16 in the CHUM Charts.

Hawkins' original version is also included in the Rock and Roll Hall of Fame's "500 Songs that Shaped Rock and Roll" and in Robert Christgau's "Basic Record Library" of 1950s and 1960s recordings, published in Christgau's Record Guide: Rock Albums of the Seventies (1981).

== Creedence Clearwater Revival version ==
"Suzie Q"

Single by Creedence Clearwater Revival

from the album Creedence Clearwater Revival
- A-side: "Suzie Q" (Part one)
- B-side: "Suzie Q" (Part two)
- Released: June 15, 1968
- Recorded: January 19, 1968
- Genre: Psychedelic rock; roots rock; acid rock; swamp rock; blues rock
- Length: 8:37 (album version); 4:33 (part one); 3:48 (part two)
- Label: Fantasy
- Songwriters: Dale Hawkins; Stan Lewis; Eleanor Broadwater
- Producer: Saul Zaentz

Creedence Clearwater Revival singles chronology
"Porterville" (1968)	"Suzie Q" (1968)	"I Put a Spell on You" (1968)

Creedence Clearwater Revival released a version on their debut album in 1968. The band's only Top 40 hit not written by John Fogerty, it peaked at number 11 for one week in November 1968. This song was their first big hit. The album version clocks in at 8:37. The single is split into parts one and two on its A and B sides, respectively. The jam session during the coda is omitted in part one. Instead, it fades out with the guitar solo right before the coda, which fades in with part two on the B-side. Fogerty plays the main riff from "Smokestack Lightning" after the second verse. Fogerty told Rolling Stone in 1993 that the extended length of "Suzie Q" was to get the song played on KMPX, a progressive rock radio station in San Francisco. The cover was first certified Gold by the RIAA on December 13, 1990, for half a million copies shipped, and Platinum on May 10, 2019, for a million copies in sales and streams.

=== Charts ===
Chart (1968)	Peak position
Canada Top Singles (RPM)	10
Belgium (Ultratop 50 Wallonia)	27
US Billboard Hot 100	11

=== Certifications ===
Region	Certification	Certified units/sales
New Zealand (RMNZ)	Gold	15,000^{‡}
United States (RIAA)	Platinum	1,000,000^{‡}
^{‡} Sales+streaming figures based on certification alone.

== Other versions ==
- Ronnie Hawkins, Dale's cousin, released a version of the song in the early 1960s with the Hawks, later known as The Band, backing him. King Curtis also played tenor saxophone on the record.
- There is a short cover of "Susie Q" by The Rolling Stones on their US album 12 x 5, which was released in 1964. It also appears on the UK album The Rolling Stones No. 2 released in January 1965.
- The Trashmen played a live cover of "Susie Q" in 1965 released on the album, Teen Trot: Live At Ellsworth, WI - August 22, 1965. Their vocalist mistakenly attributed the song to The Rolling Stones during stage banter after playing the song.
- Johnny Rivers featured a four-minute version of "Suzie Q" on his live 1965 album, Meanwhile Back at the Whisky à Go Go.
- Bobby Vee included a version of "Susie Q" on his 1961 Liberty album, Bobby Vee with Strings and Things.
- In 1970, Puerto Rican musician José Feliciano released his version of "Susie Q" as a single which reached number 84 on the Billboard Hot 100. His version was rearranged and features several different lyrics.
- The Everly Brothers recorded a medley of "Susie Q" and The Beatles' "Hey Jude" for their 1970 live album, The Everly Brothers Show.
- In 1988, American singer Bobby McFerrin published an all vocal-version of "Susie Q" on his breakthrough album Simple Pleasures. He re-composed all instrumental parts into backing vocals, all sung by himself, and also sang the main part.
- American singer-songwriter Suzi Quatro released two different versions of the song on the albums Oh, Suzi Q. and Unreleased Emotion.
- Blues band Stack Waddy recorded the song in their record, Stack Waddy, released by Dandelion Records, the record company of John Peel.
- The American blues-rock group The Chuck Fenech Band covered the song on their 2011 release Tax Free EP.
