= Swamp rock =

Rock music genre

- Stylistic origins: Rockabilly; soul; swamp blues; country; funk; Cajun music; beat; country blues; New Orleans rhythm and blues
- Cultural origins: Mid-1960s, Louisiana, United States

Swamp rock is a genre of rock music that originated in the mid-1960s as a fusion of rockabilly and soul music with swamp blues, country music and funk. The genre originated in Louisiana by artists such as Tony Joe White, but was subsequently popularized by the California band Creedence Clearwater Revival.

== Characteristics ==
Swamp rock fuses rockabilly and soul music with swamp blues, country music and funk. Swamp blues provided swamp rock with its defining guitar sound, which was low toned and often reverberated. The sound also frequently uses horns, due to its soul influence, although solos are more commonly performed on guitars. Also contributing influence to the sound of swamp rock was the hard, guitar-driven sound of British Invasion bands, as well as country blues, Cajun music and New Orleans rhythm and blues. The genre's lyrics are often "dark and menacing", drawing from young Americans' dissatisfaction with the political establishment, as well as environmentalist concerns.

== History ==
Dale Hawkins' single "Oh! Suzy Q", credited as being solely written by Hawkins (some people suggest it was influenced by a song of the same name by Sonny Boy Williamson I, though there is little obvious connection) was recorded in 1957. It is often cited as the first swamp rock single; although Hawkins' recording was considered swamp pop at the time, it had the hard edge and more powerful guitar sound associated with swamp rock. Swamp rock would not become recognized as a musical trend until the late 1960s and early 1970s.

Tony Joe White has been credited as having "invented" swamp rock. Hailing from Louisiana's bayou, White's songs were subsequently recorded by Brook Benton and Dusty Springfield, among other performers, to popular success, most notably with the song "Polk Salad Annie", which has been recorded by a number of other singers.

Dr. John (Malcolm John Rebennack Jr.), hailing from New Orleans, also contributed to the swamp rock scene with a distinctive style that fused New Orleans R&B, New Orleans blues, jazz, rock and boogie woogie. Rebennack originally created Dr. John as a stage persona drawing from New Orleans voodoo culture for his friend Ronnie Barron, but when his friend declined the persona, Rebennack ended up adopting the Dr. John persona himself.

Creedence Clearwater Revival have been described as pioneers of swamp rock. The band often utilized lyrics about bayous, catfish, the Mississippi River and other elements of Southern United States iconography, although the band was actually from California. Little Feat, formed by musician and songwriter Lowell George and also despite hailing from California, helped popularize Southern music in the wider United States with their swamp rock sound which drew from country, folk, blues, soul, swamp pop and R&B. Another California act, Redbone, adopted their name from a Cajun term for a Native American of mixed race, reflecting the band's ancestral heritage, as the members were of Yaqui, Shoshone, Southern Cheyenne, Chippewa and Mexican ancestry.

Also part of the early swamp rock scene were Delaney & Bonnie, the Meters, Elvis Presley, Jerry Reed and Leon Russell.

Swamp rock declined in popularity during the disco era. However, the Radiators, who released their first album in 1981, developed a following who they identify as "fish heads", with a swamp rock sound drawing from blues, R&B, funk and soul. In the same decade, the Batfish Boys fused gothic rock and post-punk with swamp rock to create their sound, which also owed influence to swamp blues. In the 1990s, swamp rock was subjected to a revival in the jam band scene. Artists that contributed to the revival of swamp rock include Beasts of Bourbon, Deadboy & the Elephantmen, Eagles of Death Metal, the Eighties Matchbox B-Line Disaster, Ray Wylie Hubbard, JJ Grey & Mofro, Shooter Jennings, Kid Rock, Legendary Shack Shakers, and Lucinda Williams.
