= John Fogerty discography =

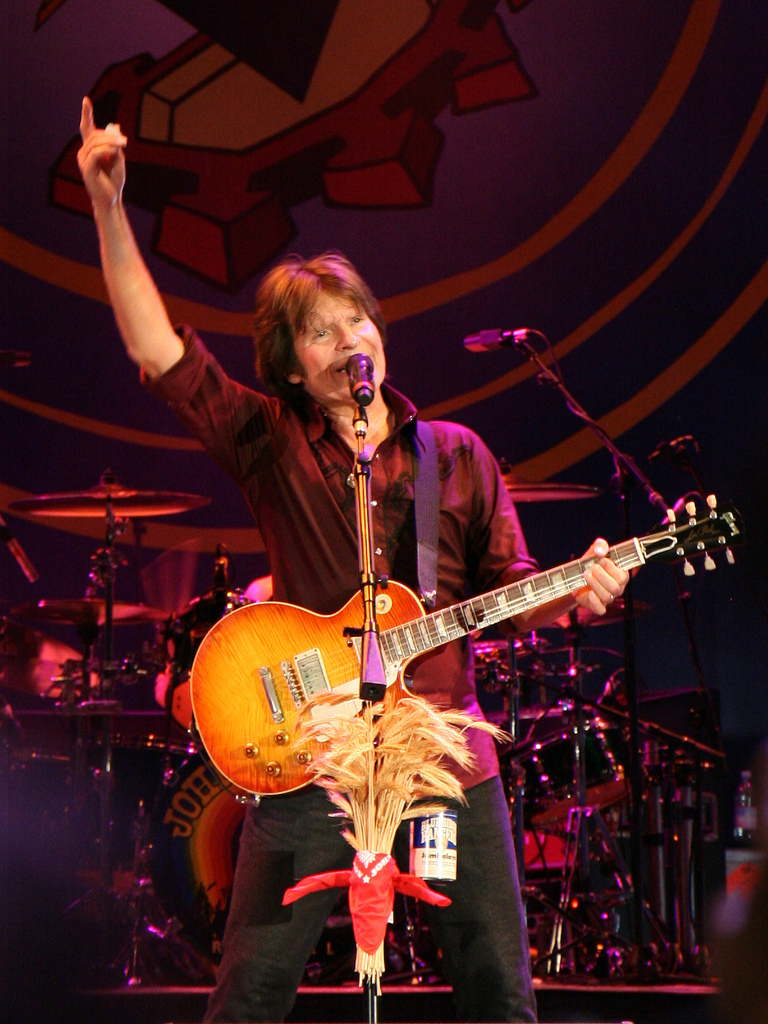
- Studio albums: 10
- Compilation albums: 2
- Singles: 26

John Fogerty is an American rock musician who has recorded both solo and as a member of Creedence Clearwater Revival.

Fogerty has released eleven studio albums between his debut album The Blue Ridge Rangers in 1973, to his most recent release, Legacy: The Creedence Clearwater Revival Years, in 2025. He has also released 26 singles, including the Billboard Hot 100 top 10 single "The Old Man Down the Road". The song was also a number one single on the Billboard Hot Mainstream Rock Tracks chart, his only number one on a Billboard singles chart.

The most successful studio release is 1985's Centerfield. The album peaked at No. 1 on the Billboard 200 and was certified 2× multi-platinum by the Recording Industry Association of America. The two follow up albums, Eye of the Zombie (1986) and Blue Moon Swamp (1997), were both certified gold in the United States.

== Albums ==
=== Studio albums ===
Year	Album details	Peak chart positions										Certifications (sales threshold)
Year	Album details	US	AUS	AUT	CAN	FIN	NL	NOR	SWE	SWI	UK	Certifications (sales threshold)
1973	The Blue Ridge Rangers: Released: April 1973; Label: Fantasy	47	28	—	59	—	—	—	—	—	—	
1975	John Fogerty: Released: September 1975; Label: Asylum	78	52	—	—	—	—	—	27	—	—	
1985	Centerfield: Released: January 14, 1985; Label: Warner Bros.	1	4	2	2	2	9	1	1	4	48	AUS: 2× Platinum; US: 2× Platinum
1986	Eye of the Zombie: Released: September 29, 1986; Label: Warner Bros.	26	17	23	15	5	61	9	7	15	—	US: Gold
1997	Blue Moon Swamp: Released: May 20, 1997; Label: Warner Bros.	37	8	46	65	1	19	3	1	26	182	AUS: Platinum; US: Gold
2004	Deja Vu All Over Again: Released: September 21, 2004; Label: DreamWorks	23	—	—	57	9	54	4	1	56	—	
2007	Revival: Released: October 2, 2007; Label: Fantasy	14	33	39	17	17	22	6	5	45	80	
2009	The Blue Ridge Rangers Rides Again: Released: September 1, 2009; Label: Verve Music Group	24	83	50	12	25	25	1	3	29	98	
2013	Wrote a Song for Everyone: Released: May 28, 2013; Label: Vanguard	3	6	11	3	12	35	3	10	25	75	
2020	Fogerty's Factory: Released: November 20, 2020; Label: BMG	63	—	—	—	—	—	—	—	39	—	
2025	Legacy: The Creedence Clearwater Revival Years: Released: August 22, 2025; Label: Concord	—	9	7	—	—	42	—	—	5	84	
"—" denotes releases that did not chart

=== Live albums ===
Year	Album details	Peak chart positions									Certifications (sales threshold)
Year	Album details	US	AUS	CAN	FIN	NL	NOR	SWE	SWI	UK	Certifications (sales threshold)
1998	Premonition: Release date: June 9, 1998; Label: Warner Bros. Records	29	25	55	10	51	2	1	38	172	AUS: Gold; US: Gold
2006	The Long Road Home – In Concert: Release date: June 13, 2006; Label: Fantasy Records	—	—	—	—	—	—	—	—	—	
2019	50 Year Trip: Live at Red Rocks: Release date: November 8, 2019; Label: BMG Rights Management (US)	—	—	—	—	89	—	—	63	—	
"—" denotes releases that did not chart

=== Compilation and specialty albums ===
Year	Album details	Peak chart positions					Certifications (sales threshold)
Year	Album details	US	AUS	CAN	SWE	UK	Certifications (sales threshold)
2005	The Long Road Home: Release date: November 1, 2005; Label: Fantasy Records	13	26	65	22	32	AUS: 2× Platinum; US: Gold
2007	The Best of the Songs of John Fogerty: Release date: May 1, 2007; Label: Hip-O Records	—	—	—	—	—	
"—" denotes releases that did not chart

== Singles ==
Year	Single	Peak chart positions											Album
Year	Single	US	US Main	US Country	AUS	CAN	CAN Country	CAN AC	AUT	NZ	SWI	UK	Album
1972	"Blue Ridge Mountain Blues"	—	—	—	—	—	—	—	—	—	—	—	The Blue Ridge Rangers
1973	"Jambalaya (On the Bayou)"	16	—	66	12	5	79	15	—	—	—	—	The Blue Ridge Rangers
1973	"Hearts of Stone"	37	—	—	32	35	—	95	—	—	—	—	The Blue Ridge Rangers
1973	"You Don't Owe Me" (A-side)	—	—	—	—	79	—	—	—	—	—	—	Non-album songs
1973	"Back in the Hills" (B-side)	107	—	—	—	—	—	—	—	—	—	—	Non-album songs
1973	"Comin' Down the Road" b/w "Ricochet"	—	—	—	—	—	—	—	—	—	—	—	Non-album songs
1975	"Rockin' All Over the World"	27	—	—	55	36	—	—	—	—	—	—	John Fogerty
1975	"Almost Saturday Night"	78	—	—	—	—	—	—	—	—	—	—	John Fogerty
1976	"You Got the Magic" b/w "Evil Thing"	87	—	—	—	—	—	—	—	—	—	—	Non-album songs/Hoodoo (unreleased)
1984	"The Old Man Down the Road" (A-side)	10	1	—	10	12	—	—	12	11	27	90	Centerfield
1985	"Big Train from Memphis" (B-side)	—	—	38	—	—	29	—	—	—	—	—	Centerfield
1985	"Rock and Roll Girls"	20	5	—	26	16	—	—	10	38	—	83	Centerfield
1985	"Centerfield" (Note: "Centerfield" also reached No. 17 on the U.S. Billboard Hot Adult Contemporary Tracks chart.)	44	4	—	—	—	—	20	—	—	—	—	Centerfield
1986	"Eye of the Zombie"	81	3	—	30	—	—	—	—	—	25	—	Eye of the Zombie
1986	"Headlines"	—	27	—	—	—	—	—	—	—	—	—	Eye of the Zombie
1986	"Change in the Weather"	—	3	—	89	—	—	—	—	—	—	—	Eye of the Zombie
1987	"Sail Away"/"I Found a Love" (Germany)	—	—	—	—	—	—	—	—	—	—	—	Eye of the Zombie
1997	"Walking in a Hurricane"	—	14	—	71	66	—	—	—	—	—	—	Blue Moon Swamp
1997	"Southern Streamline"	—	—	67	—	—	83	—	—	—	—	—	Blue Moon Swamp
1997	"Blueboy"	—	32	—	—	58	—	—	—	—	—	—	Blue Moon Swamp
1998	"Premonition"	—	19	—	—	—	—	—	—	—	—	—	Premonition
1998	"Almost Saturday Night" (live)	—	—	—	—	—	—	—	—	—	—	—	Premonition
2004	"I Will Walk With You"	—	—	—	—	—	—	—	—	—	—	—	Deja Vu (All Over Again)
2004	"Deja Vu (All Over Again)"	—	—	—	—	—	—	—	—	—	—	—	Deja Vu (All Over Again)
2004	"Honey Do"	—	—	—	—	—	—	—	—	—	—	—	Deja Vu (All Over Again)
2005	"In the Garden"	—	—	—	—	—	—	—	—	—	—	—	Deja Vu (All Over Again)
2007	"Don't You Wish It Was True"	—	—	—	—	—	—	—	—	—	—	—	Revival
2008	"Creedence Song"	—	—	—	—	—	—	—	—	—	—	—	Revival
2008	"Gunslinger"	—	—	—	—	—	—	—	—	—	—	—	Revival
2009	"When Will I Be Loved" (with Bruce Springsteen)	—	—	—	—	—	—	—	—	—	—	—	The Blue Ridge Rangers Rides Again
2010	"I'll Be There (If You Ever Want Me)"	—	—	—	—	—	—	—	—	—	—	—	The Blue Ridge Rangers Rides Again
2013	"Mystic Highway"	—	—	—	—	—	—	—	—	—	—	—	Wrote a Song for Everyone
2018	"The Holy Grail" (featuring Billy Gibbons)	—	—	—	—	—	—	—	—	—	—	—	Non-album singles
2021	"Weeping in the Promised Land"	—	—	—	—	—	—	—	—	—	—	—	Non-album singles
"—" denotes releases that did not chart

=== Promotional singles ===
List of promotional singles
Title	Year	Album
"I Can't Help Myself"	1985	Centerfield
"Vanz Kant Danz"	1985	Centerfield
"Knockin' on Your Door"	1986	Eye of the Zombie
"Hot Rod Heart"	1997	Blue Moon Swamp
"Rambunctious Boy"	1997	Blue Moon Swamp
"Bad Bad Boy"	1997	Blue Moon Swamp
"Bring it Down to Jelly Roll"	1997	Blue Moon Swamp
"Sugar-Sugar (In My Life)"	2004	Deja Vu All Over Again
"Radar"	2004	Deja Vu All Over Again

== Other appearances ==
=== Studio appearances ===
Year	Song(s)	Album
2002	"Diggy Liggy Lo"	Evangeline Made: A Tribute to Cajun Music
2012	"Swamp Water"	digital download

=== Live appearances ===
Year	Song(s)	Album
1996	"Born on the Bayou" and "Fortunate Son"	The Concert for the Rock and Roll Hall of Fame
2004	"Midnight Special"	Lightning in a Bottle
2005	"Born on the Bayou"	Hurricane Relief: Come Together Now
2007	"Have You Ever Seen the Rain?"	Evan Almighty
2016	"New Orleans"	The Musical Mojo of Dr. John: Celebrating Mac and His Music
2019	"In My Life" and "Give Peace a Chance"	Imagine: John Lennon 75th Birthday Concert

=== Guest appearances ===
Year	Artist	Album	Comment
1974	Tom Fogerty	Zephyr National	guitar on "Mystic Isle Avalon"
1978	The Rolling Stones	Some Girls	Handclaps on bonus track "Tallahassee Lassie"
1986	Duane Eddy	Duane Eddy	Guitar on "Kickin' Asphalt"
1986	Johnny Cash; Jerry Lee Lewis; Roy Orbison; Carl Perkins	Class of '55: Memphis Rock & Roll Homecoming	Backing vocals on "Big Train (From Memphis)"
1988	Duke Tumatoe & the Power Trio	I Like My Job!	Producer
1992	Toto	Kingdom of Desire	Backing vocals on "She Knows the Devil" (uncredited)
1995	Duane Eddy	Duane Eddy: His Twangy Guitar and the Rebels	Guitar
1996	Various artists	Go Cat Go!	"All Mama's Children" (with Carl Perkins)
2000	Ricky Skaggs & Friends	Big Mon: The Songs Of Bill Monroe – Ricky Skaggs and Friends	"Blue Moon of Kentucky"
2001	Earl Scruggs	Earl Scruggs and Friends	Vocals on "Blue Ridge Mountain Blues"
2004	The Wiggles	Santa's Rockin'!	Vocals on "Great Big Man in Red" and "Rockin' Santa!"
2005	Jerry Douglas	The Best Kept Secret	Vocals and guitar on "Swing Blues No. 1"
2006	Jerry Lee Lewis	Last Man Standing	Vocals on "Travelin' Band"
2010	Jerry Lee Lewis	Mean Old Man	Vocals on "Bad Moon Rising"
2010	Bruce Springsteen & the E Street Band	The 25th Anniversary Rock & Roll Hall of Fame Concerts	"Fortunate Son", "Oh, Pretty Woman", and "(Your Love Keeps Lifting Me) Higher and Higher"
2017	Brad Paisley	Love and War	Vocals on "Love and War"
2023	Dolly Parton	Rockstar	Duet on "Long As I Can See the Light"

== Videography ==
=== Video albums ===
Year	Album details	Certifications (sales threshold)
1997	Premonition: Release date: December 13, 1997; Label: Warner Bros. Records	AUS: Platinum
2006	The Long Road Home - In Concert: Release date: June 13, 2006; Label: Fantasy Records	AUS: 3× Platinum; US: 2× Platinum
2007	Revival – Exclusive Bonus DVD: Release date: 2007; Label: Concord Music Group	
2009	The Blue Ridge Rangers Rides Again: Release date: September 1, 2009; Label: Verve Forecast Records	
2009	Comin' Down the Road: Release date: November 3, 2009; Label: Verve Forecast Records	AUS: Platinum

=== Music videos ===
Year	Video	Director
1984	"The Old Man Down the Road"	Mick Haggerty
1985	"Rock and Roll Girls"	
1985	"Centerfield"	
1985	"Vanz Kant Danz"	
1986	"Eye of the Zombie"	Matt Mahurin
1986	"Change in the Weather"	
1997	"Walking in a Hurricane"	David Hogan
1997	"Southern Streamline"	Deaton-Flanigen Productions
1997	"Blueboy"	Gerry Wenner
1998	"Premonition"	Jim Gable
2007	"Don't You Wish It Was True"	Paul Boyd
2009	"When Will I Be Loved" (with Bruce Springsteen)	David Gelb
2013	"Mystic Highway"	Bill Fishman
2021	"Weeping in the Promised Land"	

== See also ==
- Hoodoo
