= The Long Road Home (album) =

Compilation album by John Fogerty
- Released: November 1, 2005
- Recorded: 1969–2005
- Genre: Roots rock
- Label: Fantasy
- Producer: John Fogerty

John Fogerty chronology
Deja Vu All Over Again (2004)	The Long Road Home (2005)	The Long Road Home - In Concert (2006)

The Long Road Home: The Ultimate John Fogerty/Creedence Collection is a compilation album by American roots rock singer-songwriter John Fogerty, released on November 1, 2005, by Fantasy Records. It compiles songs from Fogerty's solo career and his band Creedence Clearwater Revival. The title refers to Fogerty's return to Fantasy Records, after a lengthy stint with Warner Bros. Records and a brief stint with DreamWorks Records.

The Long Road Home was released to mostly positive reviews from music critics and charted at number 13 on the Billboard 200.

== Background ==
In 2005, Fantasy Records offered John Fogerty with a record deal, which included the release of The Long Road Home. Fogerty had started his recording career on the label, but his quarrels with former label executive Saul Zaentz during the 1970s led to lawsuits and Fogerty's refusal to perform any of his material from Creedence Clearwater Revival. Fogerty explained how he felt about the album's release on Fantasy in an interview for Entertainment Weekly: "It felt surreal at first, but I've been working alongside the new Fantasy people since the company was sold. Now that all the old bad people are gone, I have no lingering bitterness or anger."

The Long Road Home is a 25-song compilation of most of Fogerty and Creedence Clearwater Revival's best-known songs, some of which are live versions. It was the first album to compile both his and the band's hits.

== Critical reception ==
Professional ratings
Review scores
Source	Rating
AllMusic	4.5/5 stars
Blender	5/5 stars
The Guardian	2/5 stars
Uncut	4/5 stars
The Village Voice	A

In his review for AllMusic, music critic Stephen Thomas Erlewine found the album "enormously entertaining" and said that it adequately summarizes Fogerty's work and serves as proof that he is one of the rock and roll era's greatest songwriters. Robert Christgau, writing in Blender magazine, called it "one of the rare career overviews" that justifies itself by playing as one sequence of "timeless sure-shots." In his review for The Village Voice, Christgau remarked that because of his unchanging musical form and replicable "Creedence sound", the album consistently shows Fogerty as "the original roots-rocker" who displays aspects of his modest personality.

In a less enthusiastic review, Dorian Lynskey of The Guardian criticized the album for emphasizing Fogerty's ordinary boogie songs and omitting the more superior songs that are featured on several other Creedence Clearwater Revival compilations.

== Track listing ==
All songs written and composed by John Fogerty.

No.	Title	Original album	Length
1.	"Born on the Bayou"	Bayou Country (1969)	5:12
2.	"Bad Moon Rising"	Green River (1969)	2:19
3.	"Centerfield"	Centerfield (1985)	3:51
4.	"Who'll Stop the Rain"	Cosmo's Factory (1970)	2:27
5.	"Rambunctious Boy"	Blue Moon Swamp (1997)	3:54
6.	"Fortunate Son"	Willy and the Poor Boys (1969)	2:19
7.	"Lookin' Out My Back Door"	Cosmo's Factory	2:32
8.	"Up Around the Bend"	Cosmo's Factory	2:40
9.	"Almost Saturday Night (Live)"	Premonition (1998); originally from John Fogerty (1975)	2:27
10.	"Down on the Corner"	Willy and the Poor Boys	2:45
11.	"Bootleg (Live)"	New live recording; originally from Bayou Country	3:00
12.	"Have You Ever Seen the Rain?"	Pendulum (1970)	2:38
13.	"Sweet Hitch-Hiker"	Mardi Gras (1972)	2:56
14.	"Hey Tonight (Live)"	New live recording; originally from Pendulum	2:33
15.	"The Old Man Down the Road"	Centerfield	3:33
16.	"Rockin' All Over the World (Live)"	Premonition (1998); originally from John Fogerty (1975)	2:58
17.	"Lodi"	Green River	3:09
18.	"Keep On Chooglin' (Live)"	New live recording; originally from Bayou Country	4:02
19.	"Green River"	Green River	2:33
20.	"Deja Vu (All Over Again)"	Deja Vu All Over Again (2004)	4:13
21.	"Run Through the Jungle"	Cosmo's Factory	3:05
22.	"Hot Rod Heart"	Blue Moon Swamp	3:29
23.	"Travelin' Band"	Cosmo's Factory	2:08
24.	"Proud Mary"	Bayou Country	3:05
25.	"Fortunate Son (Live)"	New live recording; originally from Willy and the Poor Boys	2:58

== Personnel ==
Credits are adapted from AllMusic.

=== Musicians ===
- Alex Acuña – Percussion
- Kenny Aronoff – Drums
- Ronnie Bowman – Background Vocals
- Bob Britt – Guitar, Slide Guitar, Background Vocals
- Billy Burnette – Guitar, Background Vocals
- Paul Bushnell – Bass Guitar
- Mike Canipe – Guitar
- Doug Clifford – Arranger, Clapping, Drums, Producer, Background Vocals
- Luis Conte – Tambourine
- Stu Cook – Arranger, Bass Guitar, Clapping, Piano, Upright Bass, Producer, Background Vocals
- Creedence Clearwater Revival – Primary Artist
- Howie Epstein – Bass Guitar
- John Fogerty – Acoustic Guitar, Arranger, Bass Guitar, Clapping, Compilation Producer, Composer, Congas, Cowbell, Dobro, Drums, Electric Sitar, Guitars, Harmonica, Main Personnel, Mandolin, Maracas, Mixing, Organ, Percussion, Piano, Primary Artist, Producer, Saxophone, Tambourine, Tumba, Vocals, Background Vocals
- Tom Fogerty – Clapping, Rhythm Guitar, Background Vocals
- Ryan Freeland – Clapping
- Bob Glaub – Bass Guitar
- George Hawkins – Bass Guitar, Background Vocals
- John Molo – Drums
- Matt Nolen – Guitar, Keyboards
- Don Rigsby – Background Vocals
- Elliot Scheiner – Producer
- Johnny Lee Schell – Guitar
- Kenny Smith – Background Vocals
- Benmont Tench – Organ
- Julia Waters – Background Vocals
- Oren Waters – Background Vocals
- Maxine Willard Waters – Background Vocals

=== Additional personnel ===
- Abbey Anna – Art Direction
- Jim Bessman – Liner Notes
- Danielle Brancazio – Art Direction, Package Design
- Dan Certa – Mixing
- Bob Fogerty – Clapping, Photography
- Julie Fogerty – Art Direction
- Brian Lima – Photography
- Bob Ludwig – Compilation Mastering, Mastering
- Norman Seeff – Photography

== Charts ==
Chart (2005)	Peak position
U.S. Billboard 200	13
U.S. Top Internet Albums (Billboard)	13

== Certifications ==
Region	Certification	Certified units/sales
Australia (ARIA)	2× Platinum	140,000^{^}
Netherlands (NVPI)	Gold	40,000^{^}
New Zealand (RMNZ)	Platinum	15,000^{^}
^{^} Shipments figures based on certification alone.
