= 50 Year Trip: Live at Red Rocks =

Live album by John Fogerty
- Released: November 8, 2019 (CD); January 24, 2020 (DVD)
- Recorded: June 20, 2019
- Venues: Red Rocks Amphitheatre, Morrison, Colorado
- Genres: Roots rock; swamp rock; heartland rock; country rock
- Length: 60:09 (album); 60:50 (DVD)
- Label: BMG

John Fogerty DVD chronology
Comin' Down the Road (2009)	50 Year Trip: Live at Red Rocks (2019)

Professional ratings
Aggregate scores
Source	Rating
Metacritic	76/100
Review scores
Source	Rating
AllMusic	3.5/5 stars
American Songwriter	5/5 stars
Mojo	4/5 stars
Uncut	3/5 stars

50 Year Trip: Live at Red Rocks is a live album by John Fogerty. It was recorded at the Red Rocks Amphitheatre in Morrison, Colorado, during Fogerty's 2019 "My 50 Year Trip" tour, which celebrated his 50-year career during that year, being accompanied by his backing band which included his sons, Shane and Tyler. The live album includes seventeen classics from Fogerty's solo career and Creedence Clearwater Revival, as well as covers of popular songs.

The live album was released on digital streaming platforms and on CD by BMG on November 8, 2019, with a one-night-only exclusive screening of the concert three days later, on November 11. A DVD of the concert and a two-LP vinyl set of the live album was released a couple of months later, on January 24, 2020.

== Track listing ==
=== DVD ===
1. "Born on the Bayou"
2. "Green River"
3. "Lookin' out My Back Door"
4. "Susie Q"
5. "Who'll Stop the Rain"
6. "Hey Tonight"
7. "Up Around the Bend"
8. "Rock and Roll Girls"
9. "I Heard It Through the Grapevine"
10. "Long as I Can See the Light"
11. "With a Little Help from My Friends"
12. "My Generation"
13. "Everyday People"
14. "Dance to the Music"
15. "Give Peace a Chance"
16. "The Star-Spangled Banner"
17. "Run Through the Jungle"
18. "Keep on Chooglin'"
19. "Have You Ever Seen the Rain?"
20. "Down on the Corner"
21. "Centerfield
22. "The Old Man Down the Road"
23. "Fortunate Son"
24. "Bad Moon Rising"
25. "Proud Mary"

=== CD and 2-LP Vinyl ===
1. "Born on the Bayou" – 3:31
2. "Green River" – 3:26
3. "Lookin' out My Back Door" – 2:45
4. "Susie Q" – 3:44
5. "Who'll Stop the Rain" – 2:30
6. "Hey Tonight" – 2:12
7. "Up Around the Bend" – 2:25
8. "Rock and Roll Girls" – 3:09
9. "I Heard It Through the Grapevine" – 8:17
10. "Long as I Can See the Light" – 3:44
11. "Run Through the Jungle" – 3:22
12. "Keep on Chooglin'" – 6:39
13. "Have You Ever Seen the Rain?" – 2:31
14. "Down on the Corner" – 2:42
15. "Centerfield" – 3:55
16. "The Old Man Down the Road" – 5:34
17. "Fortunate Son" – 2:49
18. "Bad Moon Rising" – 2:10
19. "Proud Mary" – 3:38

== Charts ==
Chart performance for 50 Year Trip: Live at Red Rocks
Chart (2019)	Peak position
Belgian Albums (Ultratop Flanders)	78
Belgian Albums (Ultratop Wallonia)	115
Dutch Albums (Album Top 100)	89
German Albums (Offizielle Top 100)	25
Swiss Albums (Schweizer Hitparade)	63
