= The Long Road Home – In Concert =

Live album & DVD by John Fogerty
- Released: June 13, 2006 – DVD; October 31, 2006 – Live album
- Recorded: September 15, 2005 at Wiltern Theatre in Los Angeles, California
- Genres: Roots rock, swamp rock, heartland rock, southern rock
- Label: Fantasy
- Director: Martyn Atkins
- Producers: John Fogerty (CD); James Pluta (DVD)

John Fogerty DVD chronology
Premonition (1998)	The Long Road Home – In Concert (2006)	Comin' Down the Road (2009)

John Fogerty CD chronology
The Long Road Home (2005)	The Long Road Home – In Concert (2006)	Revival (2007)

Professional ratings
Review scores
Source	Rating
AllMusic	4/5 stars

The Long Road Home – In Concert is a DVD and double live album by American singer-songwriter John Fogerty released by Fantasy Records in 2006. The DVD was released on June 13 with the live album following on October 31. The album featured many songs from the 2005 compilation The Long Road Home.

== Track listings ==
All songs written and composed by John C. Fogerty.

=== DVD ===
1. "Intro"
2. "Travelin' Band"
3. "Green River"
4. "Who'll Stop the Rain"
5. "Blue Moon Nights"
6. "Lodi"
7. "Lookin' Out My Back Door"
8. "Hot Rod Heart"
9. "Rambunctious Boy"
10. "She's Got Baggage"
11. "Born on the Bayou"
12. "Bootleg"
13. "Run Through the Jungle"
14. "Déjà Vu (All Over Again)"
15. "Have You Ever Seen the Rain?"
16. "Tombstone Shadow"
17. "Keep on Chooglin'"
18. "Sweet Hitch-Hiker"
19. "Hey Tonight"
20. "Down on the Corner"
21. "Centerfield"
22. "Up Around the Bend"
23. "The Old Man Down the Road"
24. "Fortunate Son"
25. "Bad Moon Rising"
26. "Rockin' All Over the World'
27. "Proud Mary"
28. "Outro" (Credits)

Bonus Track

29. "Déjà Vu (All Over Again)" (Music video)

=== Two-disc CD ===
Disc one

1. "Intro" – 0:37
2. "Travelin' Band" – 2:24
3. "Green River" – 3:21
4. "Who'll Stop the Rain" – 3:02
5. "Blue Moon Nights" – 3:21
6. "Lodi" – 3:39
7. "Lookin' Out My Back Door" – 2:48
8. "Hot Rod Heart" – 4:32
9. "Rambunctious Boy" – 3:48
10. "She's Got Baggage" – 3:18
11. "Born on the Bayou" – 4:10
12. "Bootleg" – 2:51
13. "Run Through the Jungle" – 4:19
14. "Déjà Vu (All Over Again)" – 3:56

Disc two

1. "Have You Ever Seen the Rain?" – 2:46
2. "Tombstone Shadow" – 3:54
3. "Keep on Chooglin'" – 4:09
4. "Sweet Hitch-Hiker" – 2:49
5. "Hey Tonight" – 2:30
6. "Down on the Corner" – 2:56
7. "Centerfield" – 3:55
8. "Up Around the Bend" – 2:49
9. "The Old Man Down the Road" – 4:16
10. "Fortunate Son" – 2:52
11. "Bad Moon Rising" – 2:17
12. "Rockin' All Over the World" – 3:19
13. "Proud Mary" – 3:56

== Personnel ==
The following people contributed to The Long Road Home – In Concert:

- John Fogerty – lead vocals, guitar, harmonica, record producer
- Bob Britt – guitar, backing vocals
- Billy Burnette – guitar, backing vocals
- Matt Nolen – keyboards, guitar
- George Hawkins Jr – bass guitar, backing vocals
- John Molo – drums
- Martyn Atkins – director
- James Pluta – film producer

== Charts and certifications ==
Chart (2006)	Peak position
Australian Top 40 Music DVDs	2
Austrian Top 10 Music DVDs	8
Belgium (Flanders) Top 10 Music DVDs	5
Belgium (Wallonia) Top 10 Music DVDs	7
Danish Top 10 Music DVDs	4
Italian Top 20 Music DVDs	8
Netherlands Top 30 Music DVDs	1
New Zealand Top 10 Music DVDs	6
Norwegian Top 10 DVDs	6
Spanish Top 20 Music DVDs	17
Swedish Top 20 DVDs	4

Region	Certification	Certified units/sales
Argentina (CAPIF)	Platinum	8,000^{^}
Australia (ARIA)	3× Platinum	45,000^{^}
New Zealand (RMNZ)	Platinum	5,000^{^}
United States (RIAA)	Platinum	100,000^{^}
^{^} Shipments figures based on certification alone.
