= Comin' Down the Road: The Concert at Royal Albert Hall =

Comin' Down the Road

Video by John Fogerty
- Released: November 3, 2009
- Recorded: 2008
- Genre: Roots rock
- Length: 93 min.
- Label: Fortunate Son/Verve
- Director: Ted Kenney

John Fogerty chronology
| The Long Road Home – In Concert (2006) | Comin' Down the Road (2009) |

Professional ratings
Review scores
| Source | Rating |
|---|---|
| Classic Rock | 7/10 stars |

Comin' Down the Road: The Concert at Royal Albert Hall is a DVD release from John Fogerty released on November 3, 2009. The DVD features songs from Fogerty's show at Royal Albert Hall during his 2008 tour.

== Track listing ==
- All tracks written by John Fogerty unless noted.
1. "Comin' Down the Road"
2. "Born on the Bayou"
3. "Lookin' Out My Back Door"
4. "Rambunctious Boy"
5. "Don't You Wish It Was True"
6. "My Toot Toot" (Sidney Simien)
7. "Commotion"
8. "Creedence Song"
9. "Ramble Tamble"
10. "Gunslinger"
11. "I Will Walk with You"
12. "Somebody Help Me"
13. "Broken Down Cowboy"
14. "Keep On Chooglin'"
15. "Southern Streamline"
16. "Blue Ridge Mountain Blues" (Traditional)
17. "Almost Saturday Night"
18. "Rock and Roll Girls"
19. "Down on the Corner"
20. "Hey Tonight"
21. "Up Around the Bend"
22. "The Old Man Down the Road"
23. "Fortunate Son"
24. "Travelin' Band"
25. "Rockin' All Over the World"
26. "Proud Mary"

== Personnel ==
- John Fogerty – vocals, guitar
- Jason Mowery – fiddle, mandolin
- Billy Burnette – guitar
- Hunter Perrin – guitar
- Shane & Tyler Fogerty – guitar (on Up Around the Bend)
- Matt Nolen – keyboards, guitar
- David Santos – bass
- Kenny Aronoff – drums
- Oren Waters – background vocals
- Jodie Kennedy – background vocals
- Gloria Johnson – background vocals

== Certifications ==
| Region | Certification | Certified units/sales |
|---|---|---|
| Australia (ARIA) | Platinum | 15,000^{^} |
^{^} Shipments figures based on certification alone.
