= Rock and Roll Girls =

1985 song by John Fogerty

Single by John Fogerty

from the album Centerfield
- B-side: "Centerfield"
- Released: March 1985
- Recorded: 1984
- Genre: Rock; heartland rock
- Length: 3:27
- Label: Warner Bros.
- Songwriter: John Fogerty
- Producer: John Fogerty

John Fogerty singles chronology
"The Old Man Down the Road" (1984)	"Rock and Roll Girls" (1985)	"Eye of the Zombie" (1986)

"Rock and Roll Girls" is a song written by John Fogerty that was first released on his 1985 album Centerfield. It was also released as the second single from the album, backed with the title track of the album. It peaked at number 20 on the Billboard Hot 100 and at number five on the Mainstream Rock chart.

== Lyrics and music ==
According to Fogerty, "Rock and Roll Girls" was inspired by watching his teenage daughter and her friends hanging out. He referred to them as "rock and roll girls" so that the song title referenced them rather than groupies who the term might also refer to. It was about how teenagers have their own world that they don't tell their parents about. It illustrates those "last days of innocence." Fogerty biographer Thomas M. Kitts finds the song a hopeful one in which the singer can escape his struggles to enter a world "out of time" in which he can find music, love and girls. Music critic James Perone agrees that the song "creates impressions of love, pop music and the beautiful young women of (presumably) the 1960s. According to Ultimate Classic Rock critic Bryan Wawzenek, "Rock and Roll Girls" starts out seeming like it will be a typical 1980s song glorifying rock and roll music. But then there is a twist, he says, and the lyrics then "speak to the mystery of pop music – how it can become a secret handshake between friends, the soundtrack to a memory that means everything."

The melody and chord progression of the verses of "Rock and Roll Girls" are nearly identical to that of Chad and Jeremy's 1964 hit "A Summer Song," except that Fogerty yodels on one of the notes. According to music critic Joe Kowalski, this one alteration "changes the complexion of the riff. According to Fogerty, the melody was actually based on the Rockin' Rebels' 1962 song "Wild Weekend." Fogerty stated "I don't think of it as stealing—more a case of honoring...I'm a sucker for that sound." Kitts describes it as having "a breezy melody and an old-time rock and roll rhythm."

Fogerty plays the saxophone solo on the song.

== Reception ==
Cash Box called "Rock and Roll Girls" a "pure rock celebration" and said that "Fogerty’s lead vocal is classic." Rolling Stone Magazine critic Kurt Loder praised "Rock and Roll Girls" as "a rather spectacular demonstration of what can still be done with three shitty chords and a blazing sax.” The Age critic Mike Daily described it as having "the breezy appeal of a Buddy Holly song." Allmusic critic Stephen Thomas Erlewine rated it as a "terrific song," describing it as a "sunny rocker." Wawzenek rated the lyrics to "Rock and Roll Girls" among Fogerty's 10 greatest. Kitts believes that Fogerty's perfectionism in performing and producing the song may have robbed it of some necessary rawness and spontaneity. Rolling Stone Album Guide critic Paul Evans regards the song as "charming but slight."

Although less successful on the charts than Fogerty's previous single from Centerfield, "The Old Man Down the Road" which peaked at #10, "Rock and Roll Girls" reached the Top 20 on the Billboard Hot 100, peaking at #20. It performed better on the Billboard Mainstream Rock chart, peaking at #5, as well as in Canada, reaching #16, and in Austria, reaching #10.

== Lawsuit ==
Fogerty used "Rock and Roll Girls" (as well as "Centerfield") as an example of how songs evolve in his defense in a lawsuit brought against him by Fantasy Records. Fantasy Records owner Saul Zaentz claimed that the refrain of "The Old Man Down the Road" was the same as that from a Creedence Clearwater Revival song, "Run Through the Jungle." Although Fogerty had written "Run Through the Jungle" Fantasy Records and Zaentz owned the copyright. Fogerty used progressive versions of "Rock and Roll Girls" as it was being developed to demonstrate how many blues songs are similar because they are based on the same 5-note pentatonic scale, but that they incorporate small variations.
