= Legacy: The Creedence Clearwater Revival Years =

Studio album by John Fogerty
- Released: August 22, 2025
- Genres: Roots rock; swamp rock; country rock; blues rock
- Length: 59:07
- Label: Concord
- Producer: John Fogerty

John Fogerty chronology
Fogerty's Factory (2020)	Legacy: The Creedence Clearwater Revival Years (2025)

Legacy: The Creedence Clearwater Revival Years is the eleventh solo studio album by American guitarist and singer-songwriter John Fogerty. The album consists of re-recordings of music by Fogerty's former band Creedence Clearwater Revival. It was released on August 22, 2025, through Concord Records.

== Background and composition ==
Legacy: The Creedence Clearwater Revival Years features John Fogerty of American rock band Creedence Clearwater Revival performing the music he wrote for the band. Fogerty had previously regained a majority interest in the publishing rights to his Creedence Clearwater Revival songs in 2023, more than fifty years after he had signed them away. The album features contributions from his sons, Shane and Tyler Fogerty. Other musicians that contributed to the album are Matt Chamberlain, Bob Malone, Bob Glaub and Rob Stone.

== Release and promotion ==
Legacy: The Creedence Clearwater Revival Years was released on August 22, 2025. According to John Fogerty in an interview with Rolling Stone, Fogerty wanted to jokingly call it "Taylor's Version", a reference to Taylor Swift's rerecorded albums, which are subtitled "Taylor's Version". Fogerty announced the album during his 80th birthday concert.

== Critical reception ==
Professional ratings
Aggregate scores
Source	Rating
Metacritic	81/100
Review scores
Source	Rating
AllMusic	3.5/5 stars
Classic Rock	4/5 stars
Mojo	4/5 stars
PopMatters	8/10
Record Collector	4/5 stars
Uncut	4/5 stars

AllMusic critic Mark Deming concludes that it is a "potent reminder of how many great songs Fogerty wrote in his salad days with CCR, and shows he still has the energy and spark to give them life, but he might have done a better job of demonstrating the latter if he'd come up with a good batch of new tunes." PopMatters critic Marty Lipp concludes it is a "welcome look back at a band that held a significant place in the 1960s". Writing for Uncut, Michael Bonner notes that "The decades since Fogerty first recorded these tracks have perhaps cost him some of the high top and low bottom ends of that distinctive half-drawl-half-snarl with which a California kid reinvented himself as some Southern swamp monster", stating it "is hardly Fogerty's first meander down memory lane", as Fogerty released Wrote a Song for Everyone in 2013, an album of re-recordings alongside a couple of new songs.

== Track listing ==
All songs written by John Fogerty, track listing is according to Apple Music.

1. "Up Around the Bend" – 2:44
2. "Who'll Stop the Rain" – 2:29
3. "Proud Mary" – 3:06
4. "Have You Ever Seen the Rain?" – 2:42
5. "Lookin' out My Back Door" – 2:34
6. "Born on the Bayou" – 5:12
7. "Run Through the Jungle" – 3:04
8. "Someday Never Comes" – 4:03
9. "Porterville" – 2:21
10. "Hey Tonight" – 2:39
11. "Lodi" – 3:12
12. "Wrote a Song for Everyone" – 4:51
13. "Bootleg" – 3:04
14. "Don't Look Now (It Ain't You or Me)" – 2:11
15. "Long As I Can See the Light" – 3:32
16. "Down on the Corner" – 2:44
17. "Bad Moon Rising" – 2:21
18. "Travelin' Band" – 2:08
19. "Green River" – 2:33
20. "Fortunate Son" – 2:17

== Personnel ==
Credits adapted from the album's liner notes and Tidal.

- John Fogerty – vocals, arrangements, production (all tracks); electric guitar (tracks 1, 6, 7, 9, 11–13, 17, 19), Dobro guitar (5); hand claps, harmonica (7); cowbell, whistle (16)
- Shane Fogerty – co-production (all tracks), electric guitar (1–12, 14–20), vocals (1–3, 9, 10, 16), acoustic guitar (1, 2, 4, 5, 7, 11–14, 17, 19), hand claps (1, 6, 7, 9), bass guitar (14)
- Bob Clearmountain – mixing (all tracks), hand claps (1, 6, 7, 9), co-executive production
- Tony Berg – basic track production (all tracks), hand claps (1, 6, 9)
- Don Was – initial production (all tracks), upright bass (19)
- Brandon Duncan – engineering
- Ira Becker – engineering
- Will Maclellan – engineering
- Emily Lazar – mastering
- Bob DeMaa – mastering assistance
- Bob Glaub – bass guitar (all tracks), hand claps (1, 6, 7, 9)
- Matt Chamberlain – drums (all tracks), hand claps (6, 7, 9), percussion (13, 16, 19) (6), percussion (9)
- Tyler Fogerty – vocals (1–3, 9, 10, 16); congas, cowbell (6)
- Bob Malone – organ (4, 8), piano (4, 5, 8, 10, 18), electric piano (15)
- Julie Fogerty – hand claps (7), art direction, executive production
- Rob Stone – saxophone (15, 18)
- Betty Bennett – co-executive production
- David Fenton – cover photography
- Bob Fogerty – collaged photos
- Baron Wolman – John Fogerty crowd photo

== Charts ==
Chart performance for Legacy: The Creedence Clearwater Revival Years
Chart (2025)	Peak position
Australian Albums (ARIA)	9
Austrian Albums (Ö3 Austria)	7
Belgian Albums (Ultratop Flanders)	26
Belgian Albums (Ultratop Wallonia)	55
Croatian International Albums (HDU)	20
Dutch Albums (Album Top 100)	42
French Albums (SNEP)	164
French Rock & Metal Albums (SNEP)	11
German Albums (Offizielle Top 100)	8
German Rock & Metal Albums (Offizielle Top 100)	3
Japanese Albums (Oricon)	30
Japanese Top Albums Sales (Billboard Japan)	31
Scottish Albums (Official Charts)	11
Swiss Albums (Schweizer Hitparade)	5
UK Albums (Official Charts)	84
UK Americana Albums (Official Charts)	1
US Americana/Folk Albums (Billboard)	13
US Independent Albums (Billboard)	35
US Top Album Sales (Billboard)	9
