= Centerfield (album) =

Studio album by John Fogerty
- Released: January 14, 1985
- Recorded: July–September 1984
- Studios: The Plant Studios, Sausalito, California
- Genres: Heartland rock; Americana; rock and roll
- Length: 35:20
- Labels: Warner Bros. (first pressing); 25203; Geffen (second pressing); DreamWorks (third pressing); BMG (fourth pressing)
- Producer: John Fogerty

John Fogerty chronology
John Fogerty (1975)	Centerfield (1985)	Eye of the Zombie (1986)

Singles from Centerfield
- 1. "The Old Man Down the Road" Released: December 1984; 2. "Rock and Roll Girls"/"Centerfield" Released: March 1985

Professional ratings
Review scores
Source	Rating
AllMusic	4.5/5 stars
Rolling Stone	4/5 stars
The Village Voice	B+
Stereo Review	(favorable)
High Fidelity	(favorable)
Detroit Free Press	(favorable)
The Baltimore Sun	5/5 stars
The Kansas City Star	(favorable)
The Buffalo News	(favorable)
The Cincinnati Enquirer	5/5 stars

Centerfield is the third solo studio album by the American guitarist and singer-songwriter John Fogerty. Released on January 14, 1985, it spawned the hit singles "The Old Man Down the Road" (Fogerty's only top 10 hit as a solo artist), "Rock and Roll Girls" and the title track "Centerfield". This was Fogerty's first album in nine years; after the decision not to release his Hoodoo album, Fogerty decided to take a long break from the music business because of legal battles with his record company. In the meantime, Fogerty's recording contract with Asylum Records was reassigned to co-owner Warner Bros. Records so this album was his first to be released on the Warner Bros. label.

Fogerty played all the instruments on this album himself, thanks to overdubbing. The image on the cover shows an old-fashioned, "beat-up glove", as referenced in the title song, and text similar to a logo of a baseball team, setting the mood for the track. The RIAA has certified the album double-platinum (2 million album sales). A 25th Anniversary Edition was released on June 29, 2010 and features the original album, digitally remastered, and adds two bonus tracks, both of which were B-sides to 45s released in 1986; a cover of Rockin' Sidney Simien's Zydeco hit "My Toot Toot" (taken from Fogerty's "Change in the Weather" single, featuring Sidney himself on accordion) and 1950s R&B/doo wop song "I Confess" by Teddy Vann and Nathaniel Nathan (from Fogerty's "Eye of the Zombie" single).

== Legal issues ==
The song "Zanz Kant Danz" was altered and re-titled "Vanz Kant Danz" a few months after the release of the album in an unsuccessful attempt to avoid a defamation lawsuit from Saul Zaentz, owner of Fantasy Records. The altered "Vanz Kant Danz" version of this song appears on all post-1985 pressings of the album.

A Zaentz lawsuit (Fantasy, Inc. v. Fogerty) claimed that "The Old Man Down the Road" shared the same chorus as "Run Through the Jungle" (a song from Fogerty's days with Creedence Clearwater Revival: years before, Fogerty had relinquished copy and publishing rights of his Creedence songs to Zaentz and Fantasy, in exchange for release from his contractual obligations to same). The defendant Fogerty ultimately prevailed, when he showed that the two songs were whole, separate and distinct compositions. Bringing his guitar to the witness stand, he played excerpts from both songs, demonstrating that many songwriters (himself included) have distinctive styles that can make different compositions sound similar to less discerning ears.

After prevailing as defendant, Fogerty sued Zaentz for the cost of defending himself against the copyright infringement. In such (copyright) cases, prevailing defendants seeking recompense were bound to show that the original suit was frivolous or made in bad faith. This case, Fogerty v. Fantasy, became precedent when the Supreme Court (1993) overturned lower court rulings and awarded attorneys' fees to Fogerty, without Fogerty having to show that Zaentz's original suit was frivolous.

== Dedication ==
The album is dedicated to "Gossamer Wump". Fogerty said in an interview, "When I was a young kid, my brothers had a record called 'The Adventures of Gossamer Wump.' Gossamer Wump is a little kid who saw a big parade comin' down the road and thinks 'Hey, this is what I want, I want to be a musician.'

"Gossamer goes through all the instruments comin' by and does not know how to decide what instrument he wants to play. Then, at the end of the parade he sees the triangle and thinks, 'Yes, that's what I want to play.' Determined to learn how to play the triangle, Gossamer takes his belongings and 26 peanut butter sandwiches and leaves for the big city. On his way he sings 'jingle, jongle, jangle, ah'm goin' to the big city to learn to play the triangle.'

"In the city, Gossamer starts taking lessons and very soon he plays 'tingle.' After ten years of courage, determination, and hard work Gossamer plays 'tingle.' No difference? At first sight, no, but Gossamer, he can hear the difference. This is what I like about this story. After ten years in my garage, I played alone. They maybe don't hear the difference, but I do. Gossamer stuck to his dream, and that's why I dedicated this album to Gossamer Wump."

== Reception ==
Spin wrote, "As any pro will tell you, it's tough to sit out a season (no less eight) and return to any semblance of peak form. But whether Centerfield spawns hits or not, John Fogerty has emerged with skills intact and fires burning."

== Track listing ==
All songs written by John Fogerty.

Side one

No.	Title	Length
1.	"The Old Man Down the Road"	3:34
2.	"Rock and Roll Girls"	3:28
3.	"Big Train (From Memphis)"	2:58
4.	"I Saw It on T.V."	4:20
5.	"Mr. Greed"	4:09

Side two

No.	Title	Length
1.	"Searchlight"	4:31
2.	"Centerfield"	3:53
3.	"I Can't Help Myself"	3:15
4.	"Zanz Kant Danz ("Vanz Kant Danz" on later editions)"	5:32

2010 bonus tracks

"My Toot Toot" (Rockin' Sidney Simien)

- John Fogerty – lead vocals, lead guitar
- Rockin' Sidney Simien – accordion
- Willy T – saxophone
- Kip Basque – rhythm guitar
- Mark Miller – bass guitar
- Warren Storm – drums

"I Confess" (Teddy Vann, Nathaniel Nathan)

- John Fogerty – lead vocals, lead guitar, piano
- Steve Douglas – saxophone
- Neil Stubenhaus – bass guitar
- JR Robinson – drums
- Bobby King, Terry Evans, Willie Greene Jr. – backing vocals

== Charts ==
Chart (1985)	Peak position
Australian Albums (Kent Music Report)	4
Austrian Albums (Ö3 Austria)	2
Canada Top Albums/CDs (RPM)	2
Dutch Albums (Album Top 100)	9
Finnish Albums (The Official Finnish Charts)	2
German Albums (Offizielle Top 100)	23
New Zealand Albums (RMNZ)	13
Norwegian Albums (VG-lista)	1
Swedish Albums (Sverigetopplistan)	1
Swiss Albums (Schweizer Hitparade)	4
UK Albums (Official Charts)	48
US Billboard 200	1
US Top Country Albums (Billboard)	7

== Certifications ==
Region	Certification	Certified units/sales
Australia (ARIA)	2× Platinum	140,000^{^}
Finland (Musiikkituottajat)	Gold	25,000
United States (RIAA)	2× Platinum	2,000,000^{^}
^{^} Shipments figures based on certification alone.
