= Berkeley Digital Film Institute =

Defunct film school in California, United States

- Formation: 2007
- Founder: Patrick Kriwanek
- Coordinates: 37.858944523117444°N 122.29021510995173°W
- Website: web.archive.org/web/20141001084156/http://berkeleydigital.com/

The Berkeley Digital Film Institute was a San Francisco Bay Area film school founded in early 2007.

The school was founded and led by Patrick Kriwanek, who previously had been the head of the Academy of Art University's Motion Picture and Video division, for six years. Kriwanek stated that part of the impetus for creating a digital film school was reducing the high cost for students to film in analog, as he had previously witnessed students struggle to complete their film theses due to the cost of film stock. The school underemphasized theory courses and focussed on vocational, practical training.

The school was located at the Saul Zaentz Film Center in Berkeley, California; an editing and sound-mixing facility established by Saul Zaentz which also housed multiple film and music production companies.

The school opened in 2007, with a 15-week program and a class of twelve. By 2011 the school had switched to offering two programs: a 16-month producing and directing program and the seven-week intensive program, with 32 students.

== See also ==
- San Francisco School of Digital Filmmaking
- Digital cinematography
