= Hoodoo (John Fogerty album) =

Studio album by John Fogerty
- Released: Officially unreleased
- Recorded: 1976
- Genres: Rock and roll, disco
- Label: Asylum Records
- Producer: John Fogerty

John Fogerty chronology
John Fogerty (1975)	Hoodoo (Unreleased)	Centerfield (1985)

Hoodoo is an unreleased studio album by John Fogerty. It was recorded in the late spring of 1976 and originally intended to be his third solo studio album.

== History ==
After the John Fogerty solo album, Fogerty began recording more material for a new album to be followed with a tour, which would be very low-key, with a small group of musicians. In April 1976, he released a new single, "You Got the Magic" backed with "Evil Thing", which peaked at number 87 on the Billboard Hot 100, with Record World writing that Fogerty "has lost none of the magic" of his CCR days. Fogerty himself disagreed, saying that it was recorded during a creatively difficult period for him, and the results reflected this lack of direction: "It's dreadful. Stiff and angular, not smooth and nice. Some of the words are cool, but the musical style to me is foreign. Foreign. It sounds more disco than anything else. And disco sure did suck. That was a silly era in rock and roll."

Fogerty submitted Hoodoo to Asylum Records, which assigned it a catalogue number, 7E-1081. Shortly before shipment, however, Fogerty and Asylum's Joe Smith made a joint decision that the album did not merit release. After several unsuccessful attempts to improve the album's quality, Fogerty instructed engineer Russ Gary to destroy the master tapes. Fogerty would remain absent from the music industry until 1985's Centerfield.

== Track listing ==
All songs by J. C. Fogerty, except as noted

1. "You Got the Magic" – 3:43
2. "Between the Lines" – 3:40
3. "Leave My Woman Alone" (Ray Charles) – 3:09
4. "Marchin' to Blarney" – 3:18
5. "Hoodoo Man" – 2:55
6. "Telephone" – 2:55
7. "Evil Thing" – 3:40
8. "Henrietta" (James "Jimmy Dee" Fore, Larry Hitzfeld) – 2:58
9. "On the Run" – 3:32
