= Saul Zaentz =

American record company executive involved with Creedence Clearwater Revival

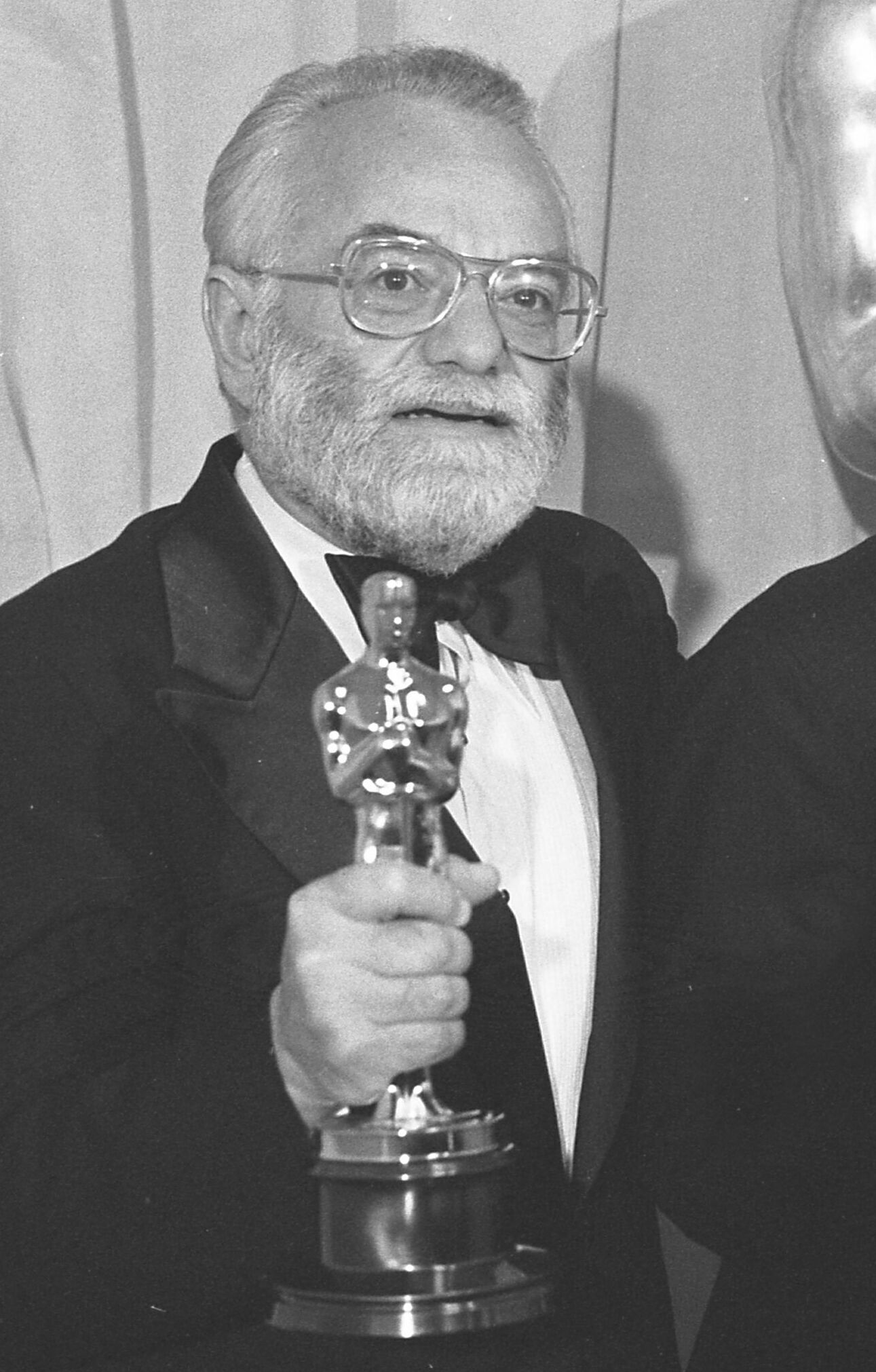
- Zaentz at the 48th Academy Awards in 1976
- Born: February 28, 1921; Passaic, New Jersey, United States
- Died: January 3, 2014 (aged 92); San Francisco, California, United States
- Education: Rutgers University
- Occupations: Film producer; record company executive

Saul Zaentz (/ˈzænts/; February 28, 1921 – January 3, 2014) was an American film producer and record company executive. He won the Academy Award for Best Picture three times and, in 1996, was awarded the Irving G. Thalberg Memorial Award.

Zaentz's film production career, primarily financed by the profits from Creedence Clearwater Revival, was marked by a dedication to the adaptation of novels. A prolific reader, Zaentz typically did not produce original screenplays. His final production, Goya's Ghosts, was an exception, being an original story by Jean-Claude Carrière and Miloš Forman.

== Early life ==
Zaentz was born on February 28, 1921, in Passaic, New Jersey, the youngest of five. His parents were Polish Jewish immigrants.

As a child, Zaentz attended William B. Cruz Memorial school number 11 in Passaic. After serving in the U.S. Army during World War II, Zaentz began realizing his passion for music by working for Jazz at the Philharmonic and record company head Norman Granz, a job that included managing concert tours for musicians such as Duke Ellington and Stan Getz. He studied at Rutgers after the war on the GI Bill.

== Music career ==
=== Creedence Clearwater Revival ===
In 1955 he joined Fantasy Records, for many years the largest independent jazz record label in the world. In 1967 Zaentz and other partners purchased the label from founders Max and Soul Weiss. The partners signed roots-rock group Creedence Clearwater Revival (CCR), fronted by former Fantasy warehouseman John Fogerty.

Fantasy Records owned the distribution and publishing rights to CCR's music, so to extricate himself from his original contract with Fantasy, Fogerty signed away even more than the original contract had stipulated. Additionally, bad investments by Zaentz and Fantasy, seemingly on the group's behalf, cost CCR millions of dollars, some of which the group recouped through legal proceedings.

Songs about the experience on Fogerty's 1985 album Centerfield – "Zanz Kant Danz" and "Mr. Greed" – were thinly veiled slams at Zaentz. Defamation of character lawsuits followed for the lyric, "Zanz can't dance but he'll steal your money". The defamation issue was settled with Warner Bros. and Fogerty changing the title and lyric to "Vanz Kant Danz". Fogerty countersued for reimbursement of attorneys' fees and in a decision by the U.S. Supreme Court, Fogerty v. Fantasy, 510 U.S. 517 (1994), he won.

Zaentz also unsuccessfully sued Fogerty for plagiarism, claiming that the melodic line in "The Old Man Down the Road" (on Centerfield) was a lift from the song "Run Through the Jungle" from CCR's 1970 album Cosmo's Factory; the song was written by Fogerty but Fantasy owned the copyright. Zaentz sought $140 million in damages but lost, in Fantasy, Inc. v. Fogerty, when a jury found Fogerty not liable.

Fogerty continued to maintain that the label misled him about investing and managing his earnings from royalties, resulting in devastating financial loss. Years later, after Zaentz sold his interest in Fantasy, Fogerty almost immediately re-signed with the label.

== Film career ==
Zaentz received the Best Picture Oscar for three films, two of them directed by Miloš Forman—One Flew Over the Cuckoo's Nest (1975) and Amadeus (1984)—as well as for The English Patient (1996), directed by Anthony Minghella.

In the early 1970s he saw the stage adaptation of One Flew Over the Cuckoo's Nest at a theatre in the Jackson Square area of San Francisco. Zaentz co-produced the film adaptation with actor Michael Douglas. The film won five Academy Awards including Best Picture, which Zaentz and Douglas shared. This award sweep had not been experienced in 41 years. In 1980, Zaentz created The Saul Zaentz Film Center in Berkeley, California, an editing and sound-mixing studio for his own films, independent filmmakers, and Hollywood productions.

In 1984 Zaentz and Forman collaborated again, on the adaptation of Peter Shaffer's stage play Amadeus about composer Wolfgang Amadeus Mozart. It won eight Academy Awards, including Zaentz's second Best Picture, and spun off a best-selling soundtrack album (distributed by Fantasy Records).

Zaentz next produced The Mosquito Coast, directed by Peter Weir on location in Belize and starring Harrison Ford, adapted from the book by Paul Theroux. In 1988, Zaentz produced The Unbearable Lightness of Being, based on the Milan Kundera novel. The adaptation was directed by Philip Kaufman from a screenplay by Jean-Claude Carrière.

Zaentz's following film, At Play in the Fields of the Lord, adapted by Jean-Claude Carrière from the book by Peter Matthiessen, shot by Hector Babenco on location in the Amazon rainforest, continued Mosquito Coast's theme of the clash of Western values with the primitive.

In 1992, Zaentz purchased the rights to the unpublished novel The English Patient and worked up a scenario with author Michael Ondaatje. In developing the project, Zaentz resisted attempts by his backers to make the story more acceptable to a mainstream audience whereby they wanted him to cast Demi Moore in a leading role. Zaentz instead chose Kristin Scott Thomas for the role. The book was adapted for the screen and directed by Anthony Minghella. English Patient swept the 69th Academy Awards, winning Best Director for Minghella and Best Picture for Zaentz. At the same ceremony, Zaentz also accepted The Irving G. Thalberg Memorial Award for lifetime achievement.

In 2003, Zaentz was made a Fellow of BAFTA, in recognition of his film career. In 2004–05. Zaentz and partners sold Fantasy Records to independent jazz label Concord Records, and closed the Saul Zaentz Film Center. In 2005–06 Zaentz embarked on a new film project, Goya's Ghosts, centered on events in the life of Spanish painter Francisco Goya, starring Natalie Portman, Javier Bardem, Stellan Skarsgård as Goya, and featuring Randy Quaid as the king of Spain. The film was made with long-time collaborators Miloš Forman (director) and Jean-Claude Carrière (screenplay). Shot on location in Spain and edited in New York, the film was released in late 2006.

== The Hobbit and The Lord of the Rings ==
Through Tolkien Enterprises, now named Middle-earth Enterprises, Saul Zaentz owned the worldwide film, stage, and merchandise rights to J. R. R. Tolkien's The Hobbit and The Lord of the Rings. It also includes "matching rights" should Tolkien's estate film The Silmarillion or The Unfinished Tales of Numenor and Middle-Earth. What it did not include was the rights for televisions shows (for any show longer than eight episodes).

In 1976, Zaentz acquired certain rights as regards The Lord of the Rings and The Hobbit from United Artists, who had in turn purchased them directly from Tolkien eight years prior. In 1978, Zaentz produced an animated version of The Lord of the Rings, written chiefly by Peter S. Beagle and directed by animator Ralph Bakshi.

Tolkien Enterprises granted an exclusive tabletop game license to company Iron Crown Enterprises in 1982, which was the largest such license in the industry up to that time.

Eight years after his death, Zaentz Co. decided to sell The Hobbit and The Lord of the Rings rights.

On August 18, 2022, Embracer Group announced that it had entered into an agreement to purchase Middle-earth Enterprises from The Saul Zaentz Company.

=== The Hobbit director controversy ===
Zaentz was peripherally involved in the controversy about who would make a live-action film version of The Hobbit, because of his ownership of the film rights to the novel.

Peter Jackson, who directed the successful The Lord of the Rings film trilogy, was the first person scheduled to direct The Hobbit. However, Jackson's production company Wingnut Films questioned New Line Cinema's accounting methods, bringing in an outside auditor as allowed by the contract, and eventually sued New Line. New Line executive Robert Shaye took great offense, declared that they would never work with Jackson again, and began looking for another director. Jackson said that he could not work on the film until the lawsuit was settled, and that he was apparently off the project indefinitely. MGM, which owned the distribution rights, was more hopeful that a deal could be worked out.

Shaye explained his company's position, saying that New Line's contract with Zaentz was going to expire soon, which forced them to find a new director. If the litigation were resolved by a court or by a settlement the original plan could proceed, but then New Line might need to reorganize to allow someone other than Shaye to deal with Jackson. The situation was made more complex by Zaentz's ongoing dispute with New Line over profits from the Lord of the Rings films. The dispute began shortly after the release of the films. In December 2007 Variety reported that Zaentz was also suing New Line, alleging that the studio has refused to make records available so that he can confirm his profit-participation statements are accurate.

In 2010, it became clear that Peter Jackson would direct The Hobbit films after all.

=== Trademark enforcement ===
In 2011, Zaentz's company began several legal actions against small businesses in the UK to enforce their "Hobbit" trademark, including the Hungry Hobbit cafe in Sarehole, Birmingham and a pub in Southampton, England, which had traded as The Hobbit for twenty years. This raised the ire of many British correspondents such as Stephen Fry, who described it as "pointless, self-defeating bullying."

== The Saul Zaentz Film Center ==
The Saul Zaentz Film Center (becoming the Zaentz Media Center after renovations) was a facility in Berkeley, California, that for many years provided production and post-production services for Bay Area filmmakers. Along with American Zoetrope and Lucasfilm, it was one of only three major film production facilities in Northern California. By 2005, it had largely shut down its post-production facilities, except for the foley recording studio, which is part of Fantasy Studios, which closed in 2018.

The film center was sold in 2007. It housed Concord Music Group and Fantasy Studios as well the Berkeley Digital Film Institute and other media production companies.

== Archive ==
Zaentz's moving image collection is housed at the Academy Film Archive.

== Death ==
Zaentz died on January 3, 2014, in San Francisco, California, at age 92 of Alzheimer's disease complications.

John Fogerty noted his death on his Facebook page by posting the music video for his song "Vanz Kant Danz". Michael Douglas paid tribute to Zaentz in an article in The Hollywood Reporter, saying:

He was the epitome of an independent, with an incredible sense of material, and the courage to see it through. I owe everything to him. I was 28 years old and he gave me my first producing opportunity. I'll miss him dearly.

== Philanthropy ==
The Saul Zaentz Charitable Foundation launched in 1997. On May 17, 2016, the Harvard Graduate School of Education (HGSE) announced a $35.5 million gift from the foundation, calling it "the largest gift ever given to a university to focus on advancing early childhood education, and the largest gift in HGSE's history".

== Personal life ==
Zaentz was married twice, first to Celia Mingus, the ex-wife of Charles Mingus. His second wife was Lynda Redfield, widow of actor William Redfield. Both of Zaentz’s marriages ended in divorce.

== Filmography ==
| Year | Film | Director | Oscar wins | Oscar nominations |
|---|---|---|---|---|
| 1972 | Payday | Daryl Duke | | |
| 1975 | One Flew Over the Cuckoo's Nest | Miloš Forman | 5 | 9 |
| 1977 | Three Warriors | Kieth Merrill | | |
| 1978 | The Lord of the Rings | Ralph Bakshi | | |
| 1984 | Amadeus | Miloš Forman | 8 | 11 |
| 1986 | The Mosquito Coast | Peter Weir | | |
| 1988 | The Unbearable Lightness of Being | Philip Kaufman | | 2 |
| 1991 | At Play in the Fields of the Lord | Héctor Babenco | | |
| 1996 | The English Patient | Anthony Minghella | 9 | 12 |
| 2006 | Goya's Ghosts | Miloš Forman | | |
