= The Blue Ridge Rangers Rides Again =

Studio album by John Fogerty
- Released: September 1, 2009
- Recorded: October 2008
- Studios: Village Recorders and Berkeley Street Studios, Santa Monica
- Genres: Country; bluegrass
- Length: 40:03
- Label: Fortunate Son/Verve Forecast
- Producer: John Fogerty

John Fogerty chronology
Revival (2007)	The Blue Ridge Rangers Rides Again (2009)	Wrote a Song for Everyone (2013)

Professional ratings
Aggregate scores
Source	Rating
Metacritic	68/100
Review scores
Source	Rating
AllMusic	3/5 stars
Evening Standard	4/5 stars
Mojo	3/5 stars
Q	4/5 stars
Record Collector	4/5 stars
Rolling Stone	3.5/5 stars
Tom Hull – on the Web	B+
Uncut	6/10

The Blue Ridge Rangers Rides Again is the eighth solo studio album by the American guitarist and singer-songwriter John Fogerty, first released on September 1, 2009, on Fogerty's own label, Fortunate Son Records and distributed by Verve Forecast Records. The apparent grammatical error in the title of the album (the verb should be conjugated 'ride,' not 'rides') is a play on the fact that the original Blue Ridge Rangers (on the 1973 album The Blue Ridge Rangers) consisted entirely of Fogerty singing all the vocals and playing all the instruments by himself.

== Recording ==
Originally announced in December 2008, the album was then titled The Return of the Blue Ridge Rangers and was slated for release by Fantasy Records, the label Fogerty recorded for with Creedence Clearwater Revival and his 2007 "comeback" album Revival. The album shares similarities in style with Fogerty's first solo album The Blue Ridge Rangers and included a remake of a song from the Eye of the Zombie album.

The album was recorded at Village Recorders in Santa Monica, California, in a 10-day session. Included in the group were Buddy Miller, Greg Leisz, Dennis Crouch, Jay Bellerose and Kenny Aronoff. It was recorded mostly at Berkeley Street Studios in Santa Monica, California. Beginning tracks started in October 2008 at Village Recorders in Santa Monica with Mike Piersante (Engineer). Additional sessions occurred with special guests, Bruce Springsteen and The Eagles' Don Henley and Timothy B. Schmit.

== Track listing ==
No.	Title	Writer(s)	Length
1.	"Paradise"	John Prine	3:50
2.	"Never Ending Song of Love"	Bonnie Bramlett, Delaney Bramlett	3:02
3.	"Garden Party" (featuring Don Henley and Timothy B. Schmit)	Ricky Nelson	3:51
4.	"I Don't Care (Just as Long as You Love Me)"	Buck Owens	2:27
5.	"Back Home Again"	John Denver	4:27
6.	"I'll Be There (If You Ever Want Me)"	Ray Price, Rusty Gabbard	2:57
7.	"Change in the Weather" (originally recorded on Fogerty's Eye of the Zombie album)	John Fogerty	4:03
8.	"Moody River"	Gary Daniel Bruce	3:10
9.	"Heaven's Just a Sin Away"	Jerry Gillespie	2:33
10.	"Fallin', Fallin', Fallin'"	Bud Deckleman, Joe Guillot, J.D. Miller	2:30
11.	"Haunted House"	Robert L. Geddins	4:36
12.	"When Will I Be Loved" (featuring Bruce Springsteen)	Phil Everly	2:37
Total length:			40:03

=== Tracks not included ===
There were 15 songs recorded from a long list of songs that Fogerty, T-Bone Burnett and Lenny Waronker put together. Fogerty did not release the specific titles, but a Merle Haggard song was revealed to be among the three unreleased songs.

== Production ==
The Blue Ridge Rangers Rides Again was arranged and produced by John Fogerty.

Production group

- Executive Producer: Julie Fogerty
- Associate Producer: Lenny Waronker
- Mix engineer: Bob Clearmountain
- Mastering: Bob Ludwig for Gateway Mastering Studios
- Recording Engineers: Mike Piersante, Bob Clearmountain, Kevin Harp, Brandon Duncan, Ryan Freeland, Toby Scott, and David Colvin
- Art Direction: Julie Fogerty and Geoff Gans
- Package Design: Geoff Gans and Julie Fogerty
- Photography credits: Julie Fogerty, Wayne Stambler, Geoff Gans, and Bob Fogerty
- Distribution: Universal Music Distribution

=== Backing band ===
Fogerty's band includes:

- Jason Mowery – fiddle, dobro, mandolin, backing vocals
- Buddy Miller – electric guitar, acoustic guitar
- Greg Leisz – steel guitar, lap steel, dobro, mandolin
- Hunter Perrin – fingerstyle guitar, electric rhythm guitar
- Chris Chaney – bass
- Dennis Crouch – bass
- Kenny Aronoff – drums, percussion
- Jay Bellerose – drums
- Herb Pedersen – backing vocals, harmony vocals
- Jodie Kennedy – backing vocals, harmony vocals
- Oren Waters – backing vocals

== Deluxe Edition ==
A deluxe edition of the album was released that included both the CD and a bonus DVD.

=== DVD track listing ===
Source: BRR DVD

Seq....Subject

1. Making of The Blue Ridge Rangers Rides Again album
2. In-studio rehearsal: Change in the Weather
3. In-studio rehearsal: Heaven's Just A Sin Away
4. Preview of the new DVD Come Down the Road, the triumphant return to Albert Hall ... LISTEN

== Charts ==
Chart (2009)	Peak position
Australian Albums (ARIA)	83
Austrian Albums (Ö3 Austria)	50
Belgian Albums (Ultratop Flanders)	39
Belgian Albums (Ultratop Wallonia)	65
Canadian Albums (Billboard)	12
Danish Albums (Hitlisten)	2
Dutch Albums (Album Top 100)	25
Finnish Albums (Suomen virallinen lista)	25
French Albums (SNEP)	133
German Albums (Offizielle Top 100)	32
Italian Albums (FIMI)	36
New Zealand Albums (RMNZ)	38
Norwegian Albums (VG-lista)	1
Spanish Albums (Promusicae)	76
Swedish Albums (Sverigetopplistan)	3
Swiss Albums (Schweizer Hitparade)	29
UK Albums (Official Charts)	98
US Billboard 200	24
