= Eye of the Zombie =

Studio album by John Fogerty
- Released: September 29, 1986
- Genres: Heartland rock; Americana; swamp rock
- Length: 44:07
- Labels: Warner Bros. (first pressing); DreamWorks/Interscope/Universal (second pressing)
- Producer: John Fogerty

John Fogerty chronology
Centerfield (1985)	Eye of the Zombie (1986)	Blue Moon Swamp (1997)

Singles from Eye of the Zombie
- 1. "Eye of the Zombie" Released: August 1986; 2. "Change in the Weather" Released: November 1986; 3. "Knockin' On Your Door" Released: January 1987

Eye of the Zombie is the fourth solo studio album by the American guitarist and singer-songwriter John Fogerty. Released in September 1986, it was his first album with a backing band, and it includes the Creedence-inspired track "Change in the Weather" as well as "Wasn't That a Woman" and "Soda Pop", his first forays into 1960s-1970s Motown-sounding funk and R&B. The title track was released as a single and reached the Billboard charts.

The album was not received well by critics and had mediocre chart success despite a Grammy nomination for Best Male Rock Vocal in 1987. After the Eye of the Zombie tour in 1986, Fogerty did not perform any material from this album in concerts until 2009, when he played "Change in the Weather" at a few shows. The song was also re-recorded in 2009 for The Blue Ridge Rangers Rides Again and performed live on several late-night TV shows to promote the album.

John Carl Buechler created the make-up worn by Fogerty in the album cover. The singer originally wanted himself covered in tribal markings, but label Warner Bros. Records vetoed given David Lee Roth had already used this get-up for his album Eat 'Em and Smile.

After Eye of the Zombie, Fogerty's next album was not until 1997 when Blue Moon Swamp was released.

== Reception ==
Billboard called the title track a "dark, shivery tale." Cash Box called it "dirty and gritty" and "rock and roll with a vengeance."

Cash Box called "Change in the Weather" a "swampy, grundgy, soulful groove that could have been a CCR hit." Billboard called it a "swampy down-tempo swayer [with] apocalyptic social predictions." Brian Cullman in SPIN called it the 'strongest, most passionate record of his career'.

Professional ratings
Review scores
Source	Rating
Allmusic	2/5 stars
Rolling Stone	(Mixed)
Kerrang!	2.5/5 stars

== Track listing ==
All songs written by John Fogerty. Song times taken from original LP sticker.

Side one

No.	Title	Length
1.	"Goin' Back Home"	3:25
2.	"Eye of the Zombie"	4:35
3.	"Headlines"	4:30
4.	"Knockin' on Your Door"	4:35
5.	"Change in the Weather"	6:50

Side two

No.	Title	Length
1.	"Violence Is Golden"	5:21
2.	"Wasn't That a Woman"	4:13
3.	"Soda Pop"	5:53
4.	"Sail Away"	4:45

== Personnel ==
- John Fogerty – vocals, guitar, keyboards
- Alan Pasqua – keyboards (4)
- Neil Stubenhaus – bass guitar
- John Robinson – drums, percussion
- Bobby King, Willie Greene Jr., Terry Evans – background vocals

== Charts ==
Chart (1986–87)	Peak position
Australian Albums (Kent Music Report)	17
Austrian Albums (Ö3 Austria)	15
Canada Top Albums/CDs (RPM)	23
Dutch Albums (Album Top 100)	61
Finnish Albums (The Official Finnish Charts)	5
New Zealand Albums (RMNZ)	34
Norwegian Albums (VG-lista)	9
Swedish Albums (Sverigetopplistan)	7
Swiss Albums (Schweizer Hitparade)	15
US Billboard 200	26

== Certifications ==
Region	Certification	Certified units/sales
United States (RIAA)	Gold	500,000^{^}
^{^} Shipments figures based on certification alone.
