= The Blue Ridge Rangers =

1973 uncredited studio album by John Fogerty

Studio album by The Blue Ridge Rangers
- Released: April 1973
- Genres: Country; bluegrass; gospel; country rock
- Length: 36:15
- Label: Fantasy
- Producer: John Fogerty

The Blue Ridge Rangers chronology
The Blue Ridge Rangers (1973)	John Fogerty (1975)

Alternative cover
- Reissue LP cover

Alternative cover
- CD reissue cover

Professional ratings
Review scores
Source	Rating
Allmusic	3.5/5 stars
Christgau's Record Guide	B+
Rolling Stone	3.5/5 stars

The Blue Ridge Rangers is the debut solo studio album by the American guitarist John Fogerty, the former lead singer and lead guitarist of Creedence Clearwater Revival.

Upon its initial release by Fantasy Records in 1973, the album was credited to "The Blue Ridge Rangers" with no mention of Fogerty on the cover. Fogerty chose to do this in order to distance himself from his Creedence legacy. The LP was later reissued and credited to John Fogerty with a different cover design. The CD reissue restores the original silhouette cover photo and credits the album to Fogerty. The album is made up entirely of traditional and country covers, and features Fogerty playing all the instruments.

The album peaked at #47 on the charts. Two singles from the album became hits: "Jambalaya" which peaked at #16 in the USA and #15 in Canada, and "Hearts of Stone" which peaked at #37 in the USA and #35 in Canada. A third non-album single "You Don't Owe Me" reached #79 in Canada.

In 2009, Fogerty released a sequel to this album, entitled The Blue Ridge Rangers Rides Again.

== Track listing ==
Side one
No.	Title	Writer(s)	Length
1.	"Blue Ridge Mountain Blues"	Traditional	2:29
2.	"Somewhere Listening (For My Name)"	Archie Brownlee	2:37
3.	"You're the Reason"	Fred Henley, Terry Fell, Mildred Imes, Bobby Edwards	3:12
4.	"Jambalaya (On the Bayou)"	Hank Williams	3:15
5.	"She Thinks I Still Care"	Dickey Lee Lipscomb, Steve Duffy	2:57
6.	"California Blues (Blue Yodel #4)"	Jimmie Rodgers	3:04

Side two
No.	Title	Writer(s)	Length
1.	"Workin' on a Building"	Traditional	4:34
2.	"Please Help Me, I'm Falling"	Don Robertson, Hal Blair	2:49
3.	"Have Thine Own Way, Lord"	Adelaide A. Pollard, George C. Stebbins	2:59
4.	"I Ain't Never"	Mel Tillis, Webb Pierce	2:49
5.	"Hearts of Stone"	Rudy Jackson, Eddy Ray	2:10
6.	"Today I Started Loving You Again"	Merle Haggard, Bonnie Owens	3:12

== Personnel ==
John Fogerty: All instruments

== Charts ==
Chart (1973)	Peak position
Australian Albums (Kent Music Report)	28
Canada Top Albums/CDs (RPM)	59
US Billboard 200	47

== See also ==
- Creedence Clearwater Revival
