= Almost Saturday Night =

1975 single by John Fogerty

Single by John Fogerty

from the album John Fogerty
- B-side: "Sea Cruise"
- Released: 1975
- Genre: Rock; rock and roll; roots rock
- Length: 2:32
- Label: Asylum
- Songwriter: John Fogerty
- Producer: John Fogerty

John Fogerty singles chronology
"Rockin' All Over the World" (1975)	"Almost Saturday Night" (1975)	"You Got The Magic" (1976)

"Almost Saturday Night"

Single by Dave Edmunds

from the album Twangin...
- B-side: "You'll Never Get Me Up (In One Of Those)"
- Released: April 1981
- Genre: Rockabilly
- Label: Swan Song
- Producer: Dave Edmunds

Dave Edmunds singles chronology
"Crawling from the Wreckage" (1979)	"Almost Saturday Night" (1981)	"The Race Is On" (1981)

"Almost Saturday Night" is a song written by John Fogerty and first released on his 1975 album John Fogerty. It was released as a single and reached No. 78. It has been covered by a number of artists, notably Dave Edmunds, who also released it as a single to more success.

The song describes the hero looking out the window and getting excited about the approaching weekend.

Fogerty released the song as the second single from John Fogerty, as a follow-up to "Rockin' All Over the World, which reached No. 27. However, "Almost Saturday Night" could only reach No. 78.

== Dave Edmunds version ==
"Almost Saturday Night" had more success when covered in a rockabilly style by Dave Edmunds in 1981 from his album Twangin.... Edmunds' version reached number 54 on the Billboard Hot 100 and number 18 on Billboard's Hot Mainstream Rock Tracks. A music video for Edmunds' version was also produced, gaining the song exposure on MTV.

== Other cover versions ==
Others who have since covered the song include The Searchers on Play for Today in 1981; Ricky Nelson on Playing to Win in 1981 and The Memphis Sessions in 1986; and Gene Clark and Carla Olson on So Rebellious a Lover in 1987. The Flying Burrito Brothers covered the song in 1984. Their version peaked at number 49 on the Billboard Hot Country Singles chart. A cover by Bob Woodruff peaked at number 89 on the RPM Country Tracks chart in Canada in 1997.

== Reception ==
Allmusic critic Mark Deming considers "Almost Saturday Night" one of Fogerty's best songs and describes the song as "a gloriously passionate hymn to the promise of the weekend." Deming felt that Fogerty's "gritty" vocals were better suited to the song than Edmunds' "smoother" vocals, but praised Edmunds' enthusiasm and "killer" guitar solo. Rolling Stone critic Dave Marsh praised the song's Beatles-like guitar part and double tracked vocal performance, claiming that it is the only song on John Fogerty which breaks the album's "predictable pattern." Billboard described it as "top notch rock."

Cash Box said that "loose guitar strings lend a sitar-like sound to the musical hookline within another pure rock tune from the master of simplicity-and-roll" Record World said that "Punctuated by his gravelly vocals and a distinctly Creedence Clearwater sound, [Fogerty] is in top form producing, arranging, and doing just about everything here." Others who have described the song as "great" include Allmusic critic William Ruhlmann and author Billy Poore.
