= John Fogerty (album) =

Studio album by John Fogerty
- Released: September 1975
- Genres: Rock and roll; rockabilly; boogie rock
- Length: 31:35
- Labels: Asylum (United States); Fantasy (International); BMG (2021 Reissue)
- Producer: John Fogerty

John Fogerty chronology
The Blue Ridge Rangers (1973)	John Fogerty (1975)	Centerfield (1985)

Singles from John Fogerty
- 1. "Rockin' All Over the World" Released: 1975; 2. "Almost Saturday Night" Released: 1975

Professional ratings
Review scores
Source	Rating
AllMusic	link
Christgau's Record Guide	B

John Fogerty is the second solo studio album by the American guitarist and singer-songwriter John Fogerty, released in 1975. It was released by Asylum Records in the United States and Fantasy Records internationally. As with the Creedence Clearwater Revival records, the album consists of a mix of originals and cover songs. Although the album is eponymously titled, Fogerty himself refers to it as "Old Shep"; Shep was the name of his dog, who appears on the cover with him.

The song "Rockin' All Over the World" was covered by the band Status Quo in 1977, becoming one of their most recognizable songs, while Dave Edmunds recorded his cover of "Almost Saturday Night" one of his staple songs.

The album was reissued on CD and streaming through BMG in 2021, the first time it has been available in North America since the late 1970s.

== Track listing ==
All tracks written and composed by John Fogerty, except where noted.

Side 1

1. "Rockin' All Over the World" – 2:56
2. "You Rascal You" (Sam Theard) – 2:42
3. "The Wall" – 2:59
4. "Travelin' High" – 3:20
5. "Lonely Teardrops" (Tyran Carlo, Gwen Fuqua, Berry Gordy, Jr.) – 4:30

Side 2

6. "Almost Saturday Night" – 2:32
7. "Where the River Flows" – 2:34
8. "Sea Cruise" (Huey "Piano" Smith) – 3:18
9. "Dream/Song" – 3:13
10. "Flyin' Away" – 4:23

== Charts ==
Chart (1975–76)	Peak position
Australian Albums (Kent Music Report)	52
Swedish Albums (Sverigetopplistan)	27
US Billboard 200	78
