= Fogerty v. Fantasy, Inc. =

- Supreme Court of the United States

Argued December 8, 1993 Decided March 1, 1994
- Full case name: John Fogerty v. Fantasy, Inc.
- Citations: 510 U.S. 517 (more) 114 S. Ct. 1023; 127 L. Ed. 2d 455; 29 U.S.P.Q.2d 1881

Case history
- Prior: Fantasy, Inc. v. Fogerty, 664 F. Supp. 1345 (N.D. Cal. 1987); affirmed, 984 F.2d 1524 (9th Cir. 1993); cert. granted, 509 U.S. 903 (1993).

Holding
- In copyright suits, prevailing defendants receive attorney's fees solely at the court's discretion, just as prevailing plaintiffs do.

Court membership
- Chief Justice William Rehnquist Associate Justices Harry Blackmun · John P. Stevens; Sandra Day O'Connor · Antonin Scalia; Anthony Kennedy · David Souter; Clarence Thomas · Ruth Bader Ginsburg

Case opinions
- Majority: Rehnquist, joined by Blackmun, Stevens, O'Connor, Scalia, Kennedy, Souter, Ginsburg
- Concurrence: Thomas

Laws applied
- 17 U.S.C. § 505

Fogerty v. Fantasy, Inc., 510 U.S. 517 (1994), was a United States Supreme Court case that addressed the standards governing awards of attorneys' fees in copyright cases. The Copyright Act of 1976 authorizes, but does not require, the court to award attorneys' fees to "the prevailing party" in a copyright action. In Fogerty, the Court held that such attorneys'-fees awards are discretionary, and that the same standards should be applied in the case of a prevailing plaintiff and a prevailing defendant.

== Facts ==
John Fogerty was the lead singer of the popular rock group Creedence Clearwater Revival. In 1970, while part of the group, he wrote the song "Run Through the Jungle." Fantasy Records, the record label to which Creedence Clearwater Revival was signed, eventually acquired the exclusive publishing rights to the song.

Creedence Clearwater Revival disbanded in 1972, and Fogerty began a solo career with another music label. In 1985, Fogerty published the song "The Old Man Down the Road", which he released on Warner Bros. Records.

Fantasy sued Fogerty for copyright infringement, claiming that "The Old Man Down the Road" was essentially the music to "Run Through the Jungle" with new words. The case was litigated through a jury trial, and the jury found in Fogerty's favor, rejecting the claim of infringement. Fogerty then sought attorney's fees as authorized by the Copyright Act. The district court denied Fogerty's request on the grounds that, according to the court, Fantasy had not brought its suit in bad faith and the suit was not frivolous. The Ninth Circuit affirmed, adhering to circuit precedent setting differing standards for successful copyright plaintiffs and successful copyright defendants.

Under the Ninth Circuit standards, prevailing plaintiffs generally obtained attorneys' fees as a matter of course, but prevailing defendants had to show that the underlying suit was frivolous and brought in bad faith in order to recover fees. However, other circuits had different standards; for example, the Third Circuit favored an "evenhanded approach".

Because of a circuit split among the courts of appeals on the standards for awarding attorneys' fees in copyright cases, the Supreme Court agreed to review the Ninth Circuit decision.

== Majority opinion ==
Chief Justice William Rehnquist wrote the Court's opinion, joined by all but one of the justices.

Rehnquist observed that the 1976 Copyright Act provides that the district courts may award "a reasonable attorney's fee" to the "prevailing party", but does not set forth the criteria to be used in deciding whether or not to do so. Fantasy pointed out that the Court had interpreted identical language in Title VII of the Civil Rights Act of 1964, governing discrimination cases, as authorizing such awards to prevailing plaintiffs as a matter of course, but to prevailing defendants only where the suit was frivolous or brought in bad faith. But the Court rejected the analogy between fee awards in copyright cases and civil rights cases. The differential standard for fee awards in Title VII, Rehnquist wrote, is based upon Congress's decision to treat civil rights plaintiffs as "private attorneys general" to help enforce the statutory scheme. Furthermore, civil rights plaintiffs would often be unable to afford counsel without the prospect of fee-shifting if they win their case.

By contrast, the legislative history of the Copyright Act does not suggest that Congress intended to afford similar rights to persons whose copyrights have been infringed. Civil rights plaintiffs are frequently without means, whereas copyright defendants are typically large companies. The primary objective of the Copyright Act is to "encourage the production of original literary, artistic, and musical expression for the good of the public." Parties who seek to enforce their copyrights "run the gamut from corporate behemoths to starving artists," just as copyright defendants are equally likely to be wealthy or poor. Thus, the Court found, there is less of a need to provide an economic incentive to individuals in order for there to be adequate enforcement of the copyright law.

Furthermore, preventing infringement is not the sole goal of the copyright law. It is one goal, but it is not the only one, nor even the most important:

Creative work is to be encouraged and rewarded, but private motivation must ultimately serve the cause of promoting broad public availability of literature, music, and the other arts. The immediate effect of our copyright law is to secure a fair return for an author's creative labor. But the ultimate aim is, by this incentive, to stimulate artistic creativity for the general public good.

For this reason, it is just as important to encourage the litigation of meritorious defenses to copyright as it is to encourage the litigation of infringement cases in the first place.

However, the fact that district courts have discretion to award attorneys' fees in copyright cases does not mean that they should do so automatically or routinely. In the United States, unlike in the United Kingdom, parties must usually bear their own costs of litigation, regardless of who wins or loses the case. The Copyright Act authorizes an exception to the general rule, but it provides that the prevailing party "may" be awarded attorneys' fees, not that it must be. Thus, the statute confers discretion on district courts whether or not to award attorney's fees based on the facts of the case. If Congress had intended for attorneys' fees to be virtually mandatory, it would have said so in the statute.

== Concurring opinion ==
Justice Clarence Thomas wrote a separate opinion concurring in the Court's judgment but not in the majority opinion. In Thomas's view, it was not possible to reconcile the holding of this case, that the same standard should be used in making discretionary attorneys'-fee awards to prevailing plaintiffs and prevailing defendants in copyright cases, with the Court's previous construction of the same statutory language in the Title VII context. However, Thomas agreed with the outcome of this case because he believed the Court's previous Title VII decision was incorrect and should be overruled.

== See also ==
- Kirtsaeng v. John Wiley & Sons, Inc. (2016): deciding the weight to be given to reasonableness in applying the Fogerty factors
- Octane Fitness, LLC v. ICON Health & Fitness, Inc.: awarding attorney's fees in a patent case
- Peter v. NantKwest, Inc. (2019): awarding attorney's fees in a patent case
