= Centerfield (song) =

1985 single by John Fogerty

Single by John Fogerty

from the album Centerfield
- A-side: "Rock and Roll Girls"
- Released: March 1985
- Recorded: 1984
- Genre: Roots rock, rock and roll
- Length: 3:50
- Label: Warner Bros. Records
- Songwriter: John Fogerty
- Producer: John Fogerty

John Fogerty singles chronology
"The Old Man Down the Road" (1984)	"Centerfield" (1985)	"Eye of the Zombie" (1986)

Music video
- "Centerfield" on YouTube

"Centerfield" is the title track from John Fogerty's album Centerfield, his first solo album after a nine-year hiatus. Originally the B-side of the album's second single, "Rock and Roll Girls" (#20 US, Spring 1985), the song is now commonly played at baseball games across the United States. Along with "Take Me Out to the Ball Game", it is one of the best-known baseball songs. In 2010, Fogerty became the only musician to be celebrated at the Hall of Fame Induction Ceremony when "Centerfield" was honored by the National Baseball Hall of Fame.

== Background ==
Fogerty took approximately a decade off from recording after leaving Creedence Clearwater Revival and releasing two solo albums. For his comeback album, he chose “Centerfield” as the name of the album before he even wrote the song itself. He said the song was easy to write. "I was practicing a song, and I came up with that guitar riff that starts the song," he said. "I went into the studio, playing the guitar with a drumbeat and it just came out." The song combines two of Fogerty's passions, baseball and rock & roll, and he was nervous about its reception. "Over the years it seemed like sports songs just didn't qualify into the rock-and-roll lexicon," Fogerty said. "There was that unwritten distinction. It was never considered rock-and-roll."

According to Fogerty, he drew his inspiration from center field at Yankee Stadium. When he was growing up on the West Coast, there was no Major League Baseball team to root for, and the closest thing his area had to a team was the New York Yankees, which had San Francisco native Joe DiMaggio on their team. "When I was a little kid, there were no teams on the West Coast, so the idea of a Major League team was really mythical to me," he said. "Through my own lore, the way I was kind of filtering this faraway dream, it seemed that [was] the coolest place. The No. 1 guy seemed to be a center fielder, and he seemed to play in Yankee Stadium." The song was also inspired by his frustration watching a struggling team on TV, where he would imagine himself to be a rookie sitting on a bench, "I would always yell at the TV, 'Put me in coach, put me in!' "

Baseball legends mentioned in the song include DiMaggio, Willie Mays, and Ty Cobb, all of them center fielders. Fogerty quoted a line from Chuck Berry's "Brown Eyed Handsome Man" in the first verse: "rounding third, he was heading for home." The second verse refers to Casey (of the Mudville Nine) from the poem "Casey at the Bat". The final verse quotes longtime Oakland Athletics and San Francisco Giants broadcaster Lon Simmons, whose home run call was "Tell it goodbye!" The line "Don't say it ain't so" references Shoeless Joe Jackson and the Black Sox Scandal.

In a radio interview with Dan Patrick on October 8, 2015, Fogerty mentioned that he always pictured Jackie Robinson as the "brown eyed handsome man" who was "rounding third, headed for home".

== Reception ==
Spin said the "track finds him preparing to return to the spotlight ("Put me in Coach/I'm ready to play today") and, though it's one of his more pedestrian arrangements, a sweet playfulness shines through."

== Charts and sales performance ==
"Centerfield" reached No. 44 on the US Hot 100. Since it became available digitally in the 21st century, it has sold 734,000 downloads in the U.S.

Chart (1985–1986)	Peak position
Canada Adult Contemporary (RPM)	20
US Billboard Hot 100	44
US Billboard Top Rock Tracks	4

== In popular culture ==
"Centerfield" is a fixture at ballparks of all levels, frequently played either when teams take the field or in-between innings. During games, the hand claps in the opening of the song are often played on a loop so that the fans can clap along; this practice has carried over to other sports. At Truist Park in Atlanta, Georgia, the song is played before Atlanta Braves home games as the Braves take their positions for the start of each game. The crowd performs the opening hand claps until the song begins playing. The Braves were once co-owned with Warner Bros. Records which released the album. At T-Mobile Park, home field of the Seattle Mariners, the song is played just before the gates open prior to a game.

The song plays continuously at the Baseball Hall of Fame in Cooperstown, New York. On July 25, 2010, Fogerty performed it at the induction ceremonies of the Hall of Fame in Cooperstown to commemorate the song's 25th anniversary, with Willie Mays in attendance. It was the first time a musician or a song has been celebrated as a part of the festivities. After completing the song, Fogerty announced that he was donating the baseball-bat-shaped guitar he used only for this song to the Hall of Fame.
