= John Fogerty =

American musician (born 1945)

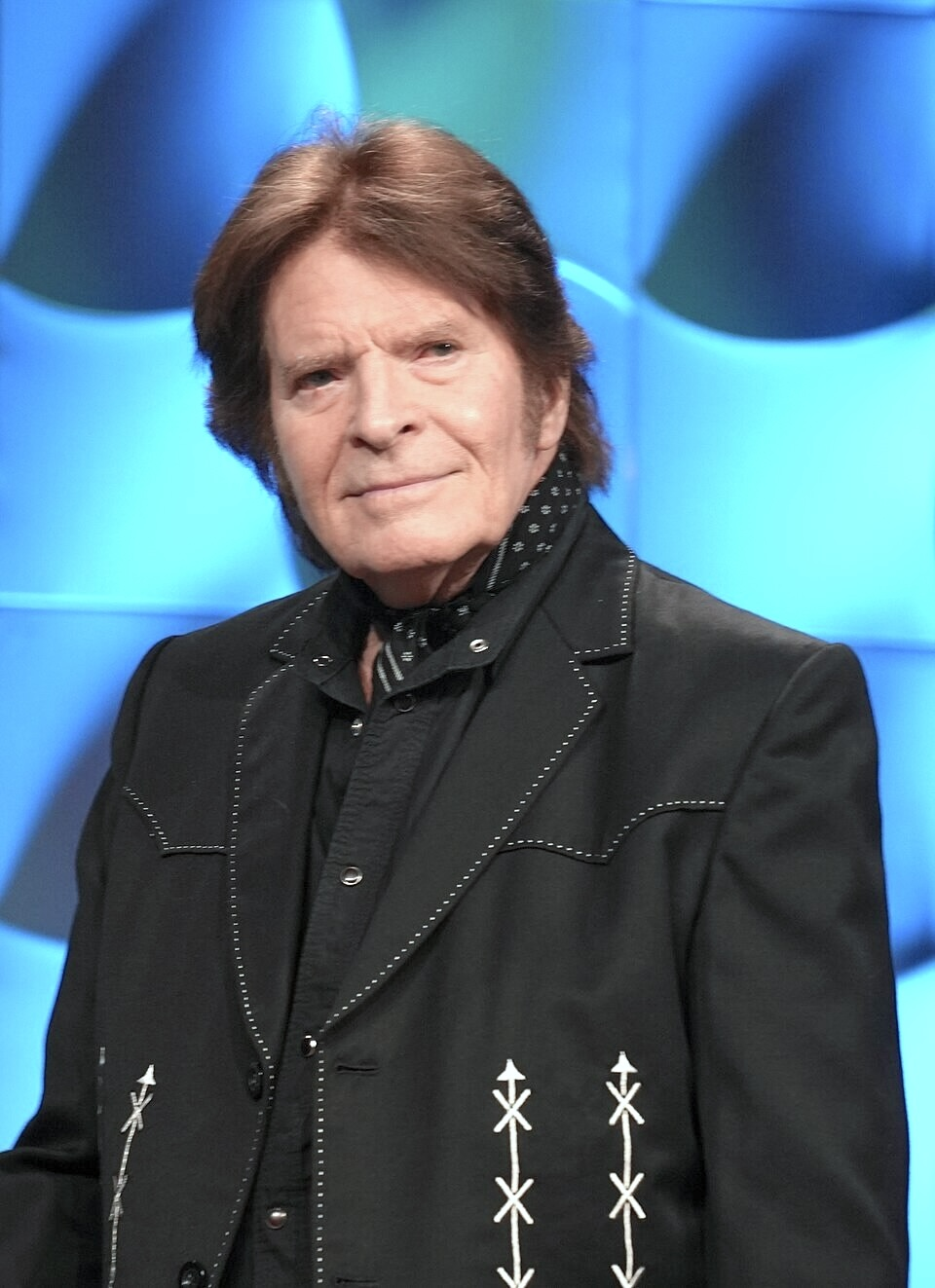
- Fogerty at SXSW 2025

Background information
- Born: John Cameron Fogerty; May 28, 1945 (age 81); Berkeley, California, U.S.
- Origin: El Cerrito, California, U.S.
- Genres: Roots rock; rock and roll; country rock; heartland rock; blues rock; swamp rock; Americana; Southern rock
- Occupations: Musician; singer; songwriter; record producer; army reservist
- Instruments: Vocals; guitar; harmonica; saxophone; keyboards
- Years active: 1959–present
- Labels: Verve Forecast; Fantasy; Asylum; Warner Bros.; DreamWorks; Geffen; Vanguard; BMG
- Formerly of: Creedence Clearwater Revival; The Golliwogs; Sound City Players; The Blue Velvets
- Spouses: Martha Paiz (m. 1965, divorced) Julie Lebiezinski (m. 1991)
- Website: Official website

John Cameron Fogerty (born May 28, 1945) is an American musician, singer, and songwriter. Together with Doug Clifford, Stu Cook, and his brother Tom Fogerty, he founded the swamp rock band Creedence Clearwater Revival (CCR), for which he was the lead singer, lead guitarist, and principal songwriter. CCR had nine Top 10 singles and eight gold albums between 1968 and 1972, and was inducted into the Rock and Roll Hall of Fame in 1993.

Since CCR parted ways in 1972, Fogerty has had a successful solo career, which still continues. He was listed on Rolling Stone magazine's list of 100 Greatest Songwriters (at No. 40) and its list of 100 Greatest Singers (at No. 72), and is a 2005 inductee of the Songwriters Hall of Fame.

Fogerty's songs include "Proud Mary", "Bad Moon Rising", "Fortunate Son", "Green River", "Down on the Corner", "Who'll Stop the Rain", "Up Around the Bend", "Have You Ever Seen the Rain", "Centerfield", "The Old Man Down the Road", and "Rockin' All Over the World". All of these have been covered many times by musicians of various genres. One of Fogerty’s admirers, the Foo Fighters’ Dave Grohl, two of whose Nirvana bandmates first played together in a CCR tribute band, has said, "There's something about when you launch into the song 'Bad Moon [Rising]' in front of 4,000 people. It doesn't matter if the guy has a mohawk, the guy has a mustache, the chick has a Madonna shirt—everybody loves Fogerty's music. Everybody."

== Early life ==
Fogerty was born in Berkeley, California, and grew up in nearby El Cerrito, the third of five boys born to Galen Robert and Edith Lucile (Lytle) Fogerty. He is of Irish descent. His father was born in Iowa, and worked as a Linotype operator for the Berkeley Gazette in California. Lucile Fogerty taught second grade and was from Great Falls, Montana. John first attended a Catholic school, the School of the Madeleine, in Berkeley, California.

After one year, Fogerty enrolled in the nearby Harding Grammar School. In his book, he stated that his parents were alcoholics and that they divorced when he was in the third or fourth grade. He later attended St. Mary's High School, then transferred to El Cerrito High School, where he met the other future members of CCR and took guitar lessons from the Berkeley Folk Festival creator and producer Barry Olivier. Fogerty's older brother Tom was a guitarist and bandmate in the group that eventually became Creedence Clearwater Revival. Fogerty spent summer vacations at Putah Creek, near Winters, California, which became the subject of the CCR song "Green River".

While in junior high school in 1959, Fogerty formed a cover band with bassist Stu Cook and drummer Doug Clifford called the Blue Velvets. The band was inspired by rock and roll pioneers, especially Little Richard, Bo Diddley and Carl Perkins. Later, Fogerty's brother Tom joined the group. In 1964, the band signed with Fantasy Records, which, without the band's knowledge or approval, changed the band's name from the Blue Velvets to The Golliwogs. This group recorded seven singles that were not commercially successful.

== Military service ==
Fogerty received his draft notice for military service during the Vietnam War in 1966. The same day he received the notice, he went to a local United States Army Reserve recruiter, who signed him up immediately for training as a supply clerk. Fogerty believes the recruiter dated the paperwork to take effect before the draft letter arrived. During his time in the Army Reserve, Fogerty attended training at Fort Bragg, Fort Knox, and Fort Lee. He completed his six months' active duty service in July 1967.

Faced with another four to five years of duty as a reservist, Fogerty began a campaign to sabotage his fitness for service. He began to engage in such activities as strict fasting to give an emaciated appearance, smoking marijuana before an army psychological evaluation, engaging in petty crime, and planting a syringe in his belongings. As a result of this behavior, Fogerty was granted an early discharge from the Army Reserve in mid-1968.

== Creedence Clearwater Revival (1968–1972) ==
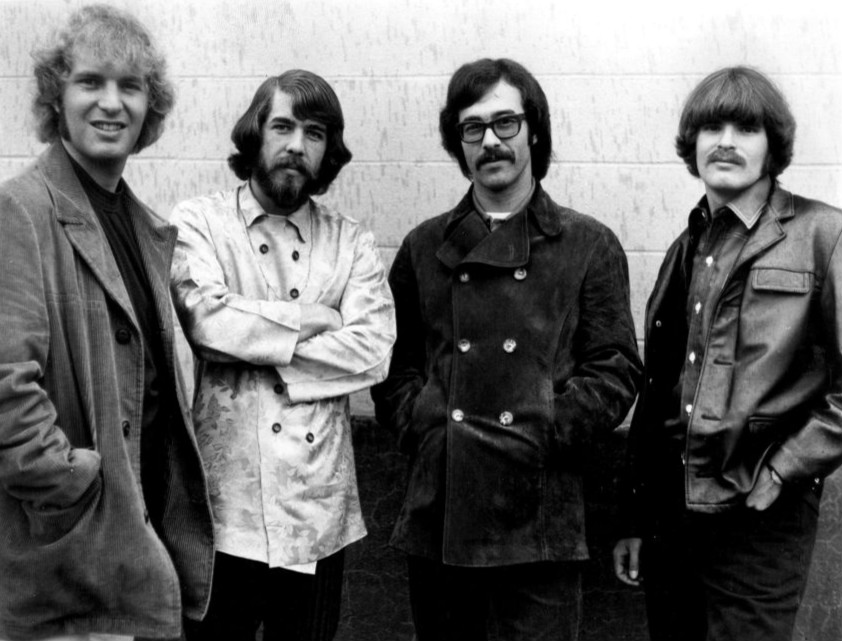
Creedence Clearwater Revival in 1968, from left to right: Tom Fogerty, Doug Clifford, Stu Cook, and John Fogerty

After Fogerty's active duty Army Reserve service ended, the Golliwogs resumed playing. In 1968, they changed their name to Creedence Clearwater Revival, with John taking his brother's place as lead singer. The band released their eponymous debut album and also had their first hit single, "Susie Q". Many other hit singles and albums followed, beginning with "Proud Mary" and the album Bayou Country.

Fogerty, as writer, producer and arranger of the songs for the band as well as lead singer and lead guitarist, felt that his musical opinions should count for more than those of the others, leading to resentments within the band. These internal rifts, and Tom's feeling that he was being taken for granted, caused his brother to leave the group in December 1970. The two other group members, bassist Cook and drummer Clifford, also wanted a greater role in the band's future. Fogerty, in an attempt to keep things together, insisted they then share equal songwriting and vocal time on what became the band's final album, Mardi Gras. Released in April 1972, it included the band's last two singles, the 1971 hit "Sweet Hitch-Hiker", and "Someday Never Comes", which made it into the Billboard Top 30. The album was a commercial success despite poor reviews, peaking at number 12 and achieving gold-record status. The group disbanded shortly after the album was released.

The only reunion of all four original members was at Tom Fogerty's wedding in 1980. Fogerty, Clifford, and Cook played a 45-minute set at their 20th El Cerrito high school class reunion in 1983, and Fogerty and Clifford were reunited again for a brief set at their 25th class reunion.

Even early in his career, "Fogerty's attitude toward music [was] serious, practiced, even perfectionistic. He drilled his bandmates in rehearsal after rehearsal, insisting that his songs be performed his way. ...[He] was known for not indulging in drugs, and although John struggled with alcohol later in life he had only contempt for musicians whose habits interfered with their performances." "Not in my band", he wrote in his memoir, Fortunate Son. "You dare not be stoned playing music around me.... When you're working, you're supposed to be working."

== Solo career ==
=== 1972–1985 ===
As Creedence was coming to an end, Fogerty began working on a solo album of country and western covers, on which he produced and arranged all the tracks and played all of the instruments. He elected to credit the album to The Blue Ridge Rangers—a band of which he was the only member.

The eponymous The Blue Ridge Rangers was released in 1973; it spun off the top-20 hit "Jambalaya", as well as a lesser hit in "Hearts of Stone". Fogerty, still using "The Blue Ridge Rangers" name, then released a self-penned rock-and-roll single "You Don't Owe Me" b/w "Back in the Hills". It was a commercial flop, failing to make the US Billboard Hot 100, though "You Don't Owe Me" was a minor hit in Canada, reaching No. 79. Fogerty thereafter abandoned the "Blue Ridge Rangers" identity and released all his subsequent work under his own name. In early 1974, he released "Comin' Down The Road", backed with the instrumental "Ricochet".

His first self-titled solo album, John Fogerty, was released in 1975. Sales were slim and legal problems delayed a follow-up, though it yielded "Rockin' All Over the World", a No. 27 hit for Fogerty in the United States. In 1977, the British rock band Status Quo recorded their version of "Rockin' All Over the World", which hit No. 3 in the UK and was a Top 20 hit in several other countries (although it did not make the Top 100 in the US). Status Quo played the song at the opening of the 1985 Live Aid concert.

In 1976, Fogerty finished an album called Hoodoo. A single, "You Got the Magic" backed with "Evil Thing", preceded the album's release, but it performed poorly. The album, covers of which had already been printed, was rejected by Asylum Records a few weeks before its scheduled release. John agreed with Asylum head Joe Smith that it was not up to his usual high standards. He instructed his engineer Russ Gary to destroy the master tapes for Hoodoo shortly thereafter.

=== 1985–1997 ===
After a hiatus of several years from the music industry, Fogerty's solo career re-emerged with 1985's Centerfield, his first album for Warner Bros. Records, which had taken co-ownership of Asylum's contract with Fogerty. Centerfield went to the top of the charts and included a Top 10 hit in "The Old Man Down the Road". The title track is frequently played on classic rock radio and at baseball games to this day, but the album led to legal problems for Fogerty.

Two songs on the album, "Zanz Kant Danz" and "Mr. Greed", were believed to be attacks on Fogerty's former boss at Fantasy Records, Saul Zaentz. "Zanz Kant Danz" was about a pig that cannot dance but would "steal your money". When Zaentz responded with a lawsuit, Fogerty issued a revised version: "Vanz Kant Danz" (changing the lead character's name to Vanz). Another lawsuit (Fantasy, Inc. v. Fogerty) claimed that "The Old Man Down the Road" shared the same chorus as "Run Through the Jungle", a song from Fogerty's days with CCR to which Fantasy Records still owned the publishing rights. Fogerty ultimately won his case when he proved that the two songs were distinct compositions, and that sounding like himself was hardly plagiarizing. Fogerty then countersued for attorney fees (Fogerty v. Fantasy). After losing in the Ninth Circuit Court of Appeals, Fogerty won his case in the U.S. Supreme Court, which ruled that a trial court has discretion in awarding fees to defendants or plaintiffs.

On May 31, 1985, Fogerty filmed a one-hour music and interview special for Showtime called John Fogerty's All-Stars. The setlist consisted of rhythm and blues tunes from the 1960s, as well as material from the Centerfield LP. It also included the song "No Love in You" written by Michael Anderson, which Fogerty found on the Textones' debut album Midnight Mission and later recorded with the Textones' band leader, Carla Olson. John Fogerty's All-Stars was recorded in front of an audience of Warners Bros. Music employees and other invited guests at A&M Records in Hollywood. The band included Albert Lee, Booker T. Jones, Duck Dunn, Steve Douglas, and Prairie Prince.

The follow-up album to Centerfield was Eye of the Zombie. Released in 1986, it was significantly less successful than its predecessor. Fogerty toured behind the album, but he refused to play any CCR material. Eye of the Zombie took on a darker mood, talking about a troubled society, terrorism, and pop stars selling out. For many years after the Eye of the Zombie tour ended in late 1986, Fogerty refused to play material from the album in concert. However, "Change in the Weather" was included in the setlist for his 2009 tour, and it was even re-recorded for that year's solo release, The Blue Ridge Rangers Rides Again.

Fogerty played Creedence material again at a concert in Washington, D.C., for Vietnam veterans that took place on July 4, 1987. The show was aired on HBO. Aside from a guest appearance at the Palomino and performance at the 1986 Rock and Roll Hall of Fame induction ceremony, this was the first time Fogerty had performed any Creedence Clearwater Revival songs for a large audience since 1972. On May 27, 1989, he played a set of CCR material at Oakland Coliseum for the Concert Against AIDS. His backing band that night consisted of Jerry Garcia and Bob Weir on guitars, Randy Jackson on bass, and Steve Jordan on drums.

In 1990, Fogerty's brother and former bandmate Tom died of complications from AIDS at the age of 48, survived by his second wife and six children. It is believed that Tom had contracted HIV from blood transfusions during surgery for a back ailment. Specifically, he died from a tuberculosis infection. John Fogerty has mentioned that the darkest moments in his life were when his brother took the record company's side in their royalties dispute, and that when his brother died, the two of them were barely speaking to each other. In fact, even in the brothers' last conversation with each other, Tom at one point referred to CCR's former manager Saul Zaentz as his "best friend". Given that Zaentz had swindled the band out of millions of dollars and had just recently sued John, this revelation made it painfully difficult for John to reconcile with his brother. In the eulogy he delivered at Tom's funeral, he said: "We wanted to grow up and be musicians. I guess we achieved half of that, becoming rock 'n roll stars. We didn't necessarily grow up."

Fogerty traveled to Mississippi in 1990 for inspiration, and visited the gravesite of blues legend Robert Johnson. While there, he realized that he believed Johnson was the true spiritual owner of his own songs, no matter what businessman owned the rights to them, and decided to start making a new album and to perform his old CCR material regularly in concert. At this time, visiting the Mount Zion Missionary Baptist Church cemetery, Fogerty met Skip Henderson, a New Jersey vintage guitar dealer who had formed a nonprofit corporation, the Mount Zion Memorial Fund, to honor Johnson with a memorial marker. Fogerty subsequently funded headstones for Charlie Patton, James "Son" Thomas, Mississippi Joe Callicott, Eugene Powell, and Lonnie Pitchford, and helped with financial arrangements for numerous others.

Creedence Clearwater Revival was inducted into the Rock and Roll Hall of Fame in 1993. Fogerty refused to perform with his former bandmates and fellow inductees Stu Cook and Doug Clifford during the musical portion of the induction ceremony, citing the Zaentz lawsuit as a reason. In place of the surviving members of CCR, Fogerty recruited session musicians for the rhythm section and was also joined by Bruce Springsteen and Robbie Robertson in performing three songs: "Who'll Stop the Rain", "Born on the Bayou", and "Green River". Tom's widow, Tricia, had expected a CCR reunion and even brought the urn containing her husband's ashes to the ceremony. Furious, Cook and Clifford, who were seated with their families at a table across the room from Fogerty's, walked out of the ballroom just as the performance began, and would later write letters to the Rock and Roll Hall of Fame's board of directors, saying it was "hurtful" and "insulting" to allow the performance to continue without them. During the induction speech, Springsteen said, "As a songwriter, only a few did as much in three minutes [as John Fogerty]. He was an Old Testament, shaggy-haired prophet, a fatalist. Funny, too. He was severe, he was precise, he said what he had to say and he got out of there."

=== 1997–present ===
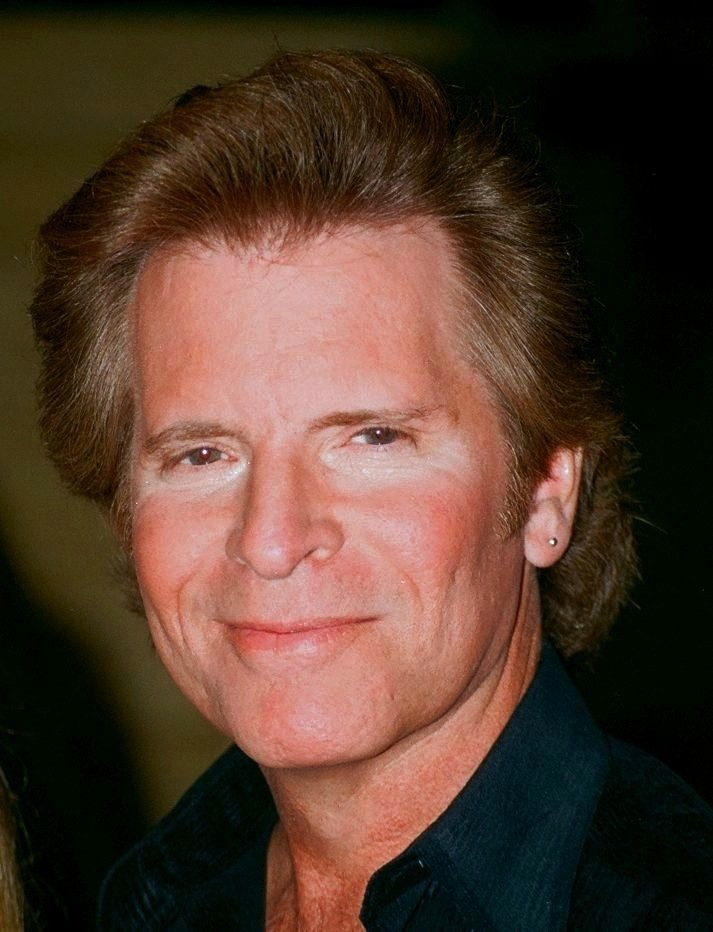
Fogerty in Washington, D.C., in 1998

Fogerty returned to the commercial music industry in 1997 with Blue Moon Swamp. The layoff between the Zombie and Swamp releases had been longer than his mid-1970s to mid-1980s break. The album was much more successful than Zombie and won the Grammy for best rock album in 1997. A live album, titled Premonition, of the equally successful Blue Moon Swamp tour, was released to similar acclaim and good sales in 1998. A track from Blue Moon Swamp titled "Blue Moon Nights" was used in the 2002 film The Rookie.

On October 1, 1998, John Fogerty was honored with a star on the Hollywood Walk of Fame located at 7000 Hollywood Blvd.

In 2004, Fogerty released Deja Vu All Over Again through DreamWorks Records, which had taken over distribution of his Warner catalog. Rolling Stone wrote: "The title track is Fogerty's indictment of the Iraq War as another Vietnam, a senseless squandering of American lives and power." On the album, he managed to squeeze ten songs into only 34 minutes.

The sale of Fantasy Records to Concord Records in 2004 ended the 30-year estrangement between Fogerty and his former label, as the new owners took steps to restore royalty rights he had given up to be released from his contract with Fantasy in the mid-1970s. In September 2005, Fogerty returned to Fantasy Records, made possible when DreamWorks Records' noncountry-music unit was absorbed by Geffen Records, which dropped John, but continued to distribute his earlier solo albums. The first album released under the new Fantasy contract was The Long Road Home in November 2005, a compilation combining his CCR hits with solo material. A live CD and concert DVD were released the following year.

Fogerty's touring schedule increased in the period after Deja Vu All Over Again. In October 2004, he appeared on the Vote for Change tour, playing seven of the concerts in U.S. swing states. He also appeared in a Christmas special video produced by the Australian children's group The Wiggles. Fogerty toured with John Mellencamp in the summer of 2005 and with Willie Nelson in the summer of 2006. On June 29, 2006, he played his first headlining British concert since 1972, at the Hammersmith Apollo theater in London, as part of the European leg of the tour. He also performed in Sundsvall, Sweden, where 25,000 people came to see him perform at the town square. On Thanksgiving Day of 2006, Fogerty performed at halftime at the Miami Dolphins/Detroit Lions game and at the Denver Broncos/Kansas City Chiefs halftime later that evening.

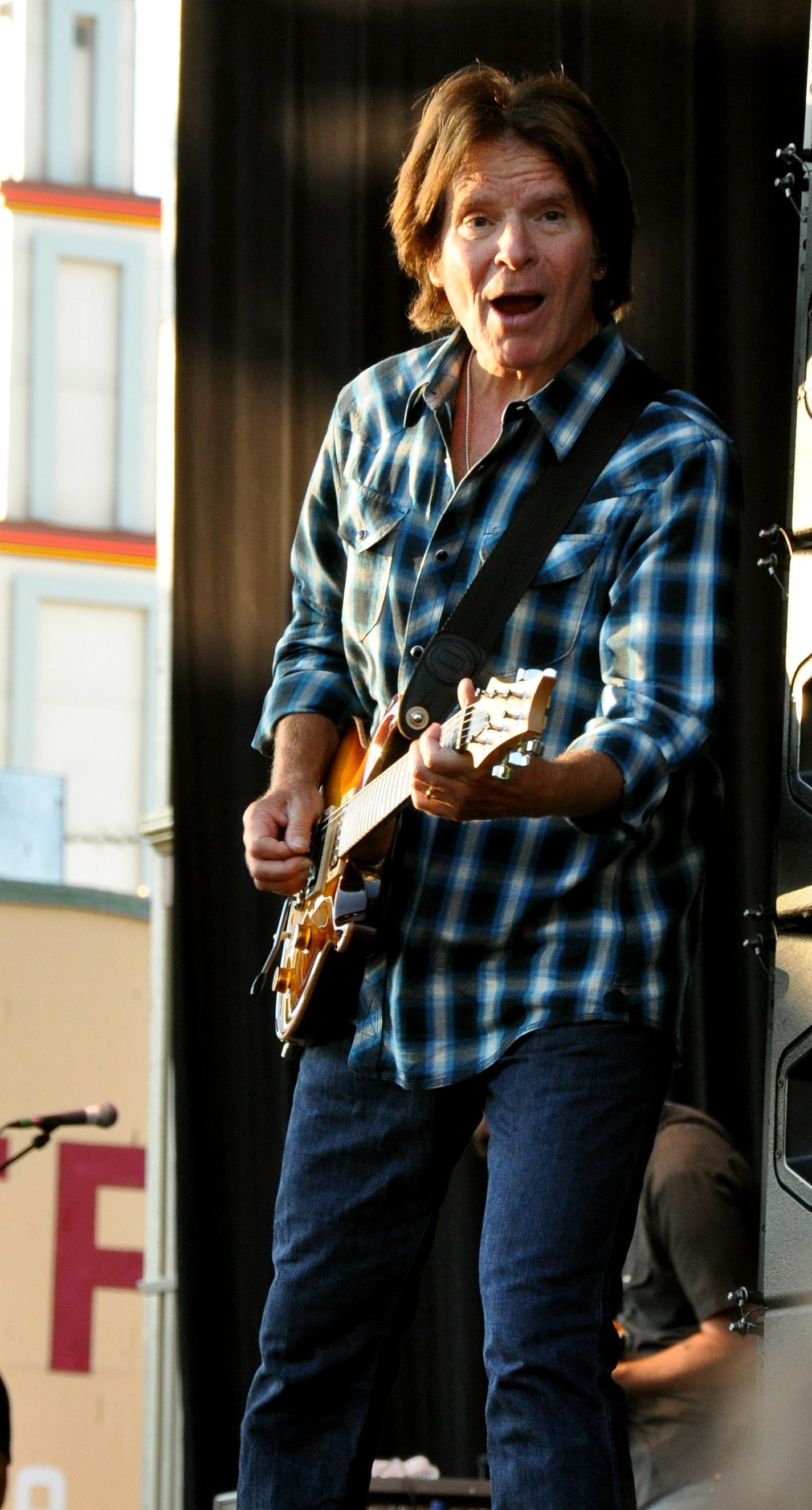
Fogerty in concert, 2010

Fogerty was inducted into the Songwriters Hall of Fame in 2005. That same year, he also received the Golden Plate Award of the American Academy of Achievement presented by Awards Council member B.B. King.

On June 23, 2007, Fogerty appeared at Glastonbury Festival, playing an hour-long set of 17 songs, mainly CCR classics. Introducing "Who'll Stop the Rain", he said he did not perform it at Woodstock as rumored, but wrote the song inspired by the event.

Revival was released October 2, 2007. Heavily promoted by the label, Revival debuted at No. 14 on the U.S. Billboard 200 chart with sales of roughly 65,000 copies in its first week. Revival was nominated for a Grammy Award for Best Rock Album of 2008, but lost to the Foo Fighters.

On February 10, 2008, Fogerty appeared with Jerry Lee Lewis and Little Richard on the Grammy Awards show. Along with these rock icons and his regular touring band, he played his 1973 single "Comin' Down The Road", leading into Lewis and Richard's performances of "Great Balls of Fire" and "Good Golly Miss Molly", respectively.

On March 16, 2008, Fogerty kicked off an Australian tour. On March 22 in Point Nepean, Australia, surprise guest Keith Urban joined him on stage, performing two songs: "Broken Down Cowboy", off Fogerty's newest album Revival, and "Cotton Fields", from CCR's album Willy & the Poor Boys.

On June 24, 2008, John made a return to the Royal Albert Hall, a venue he last played with CCR in 1971. It was the last concert on his 2008 European tour. This concert was filmed and released the following year.

On April 16, 2009, he performed his hit "Centerfield" from center field of the new Yankee Stadium at its opening-day festivities.

In July 2009, Fogerty performed a series of concerts with the Los Angeles Philharmonic at the Hollywood Bowl, all of which were sold out. Though billed as Fogerty with the L.A. Philharmonic, the orchestra began the night with music by other U.S. composers. Fogerty and his band came on after intermission, ultimately playing only three songs with the orchestra.

On August 31, 2009, Fogerty released The Blue Ridge Rangers Rides Again, a sequel to his 1973 solo debut The Blue Ridge Rangers. The album includes a duet with Bruce Springsteen on the Everly Brothers classic "When Will I Be Loved". In addition, Don Henley and Timothy B. Schmit of Eagles sang with Fogerty on a cover of Rick Nelson's classic "Garden Party". The album was the first issued on Fogerty's own label Fortunate Son Records, and distributed by the Verve Forecast Records unit of Universal Music Group (which also handles the Fogerty and Creedence Fantasy catalogue).

On October 29, 2009, John appeared at Madison Square Garden for the first night of the celebratory 25th Anniversary Rock and Roll Hall of Fame concerts. Bruce Springsteen, with the E Street Band, called Fogerty out to play three songs with them: "Fortunate Son", "Proud Mary", and lastly Roy Orbison's "Oh, Pretty Woman". The show aired as a four-hour special on HBO on November 29, 2009.

On November 3, 2009, Fogerty released the Royal Albert Hall DVD titled Comin' Down The Road, named after his 1973 single, which he performed at this concert. The following year, he was nominated for a Grammy Award for the Best Rock Solo Vocal Performance for the song "Change in the Weather", which he recorded for The Blue Ridge Rangers Rides Again.

For his songwriting achievements, Fogerty was also honored as a Broadcast Music Incorporated Icon at the 58th annual BMI Pop Awards on May 18, 2010. BMI Icons are selected because of their "unique and indelible influence on generations of music makers".

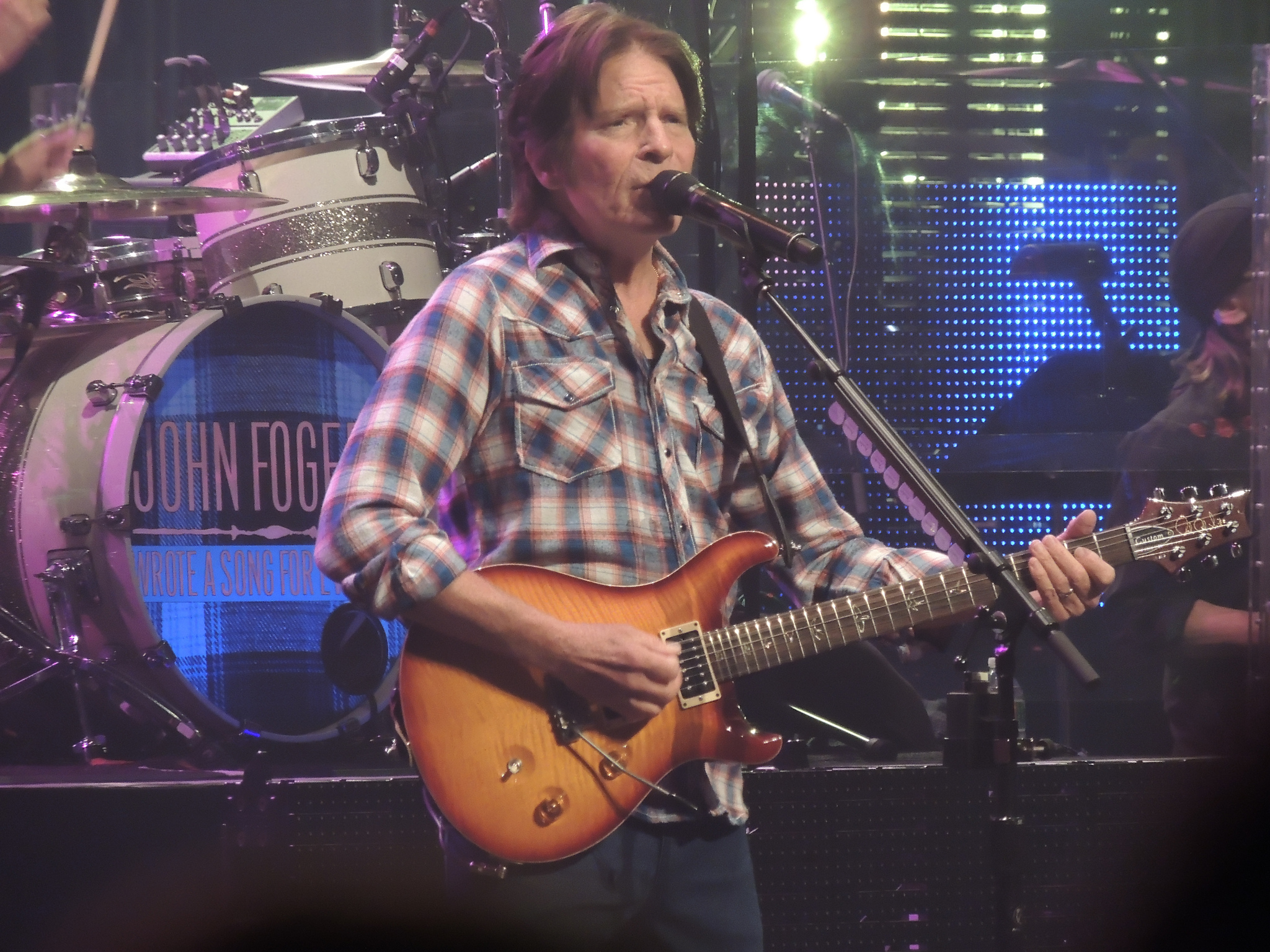
Fogerty at the Beacon Theatre, November 11, 2013

Fogerty began recording Wrote a Song for Everyone in 2011, which was released on Vanguard Records on May 28, 2013, his 68th birthday. The album is a collection of classic tracks from his canon of hits performed with other artists. One of them, the country star Brad Paisley, called Fogerty "such a student of guitar playing that I end up not being able to get a word in edgewise, because he just asks all these questions about guitar amps.... He is more interested in learning than anyone I know that's my age or younger." The album includes two new Fogerty-penned songs.

On November 17, 2011, Fogerty performed on the Late Show with David Letterman. On November 17 and 18 of that year, he performed two CCR albums, Cosmo's Factory and Green River, respectively and in their entirety, at the Beacon Theatre in New York City (he also played Cosmo's Factory in Atlantic City on November 20). He was also featured on the CBS coverage of the 2011 Thanksgiving Day Parade, performing several prerecorded songs.

In January 2012, his new song "Swamp Water" debuted over the opening credits of the new Fox TV series The Finder. Fogerty wrote the song for the show and guest-starred in its debut episode. On November 12, 2012, John announced he was writing his memoirs, and that the book was expected to be released in 2015.

During the 2014 Veterans Days celebration, "Salute to the Troops" at the White House, Fogerty performed for many military veterans.

On February 21, 2015, he was a featured artist for the National Hockey League stadium series game between the Los Angeles Kings and the San Jose Sharks at Levi's Stadium in Santa Clara, California.

In October 2015, Fogerty published his autobiography, Fortunate Son, with help from biographer Jimmy McDonough.

In September 2017, Fogerty signed a new recording contract with BMG Rights Management, which will cover an upcoming album and his solo catalogue.

In November 2019, he appeared on Public Broadcasting Station pledge week with "John Fogerty: My 50 Year Trip", a taped performance from Red Rocks Amphitheater in Colorado. He also performed at Winstar in Thackerville, Oklahoma, on December 31, 2019, but the remaining performances of that tour, "My 50 Year Trip", were postponed due to the COVID-19 pandemic.

While on lockdown during the pandemic in early 2020, Fogerty, accompanied by sons Shane and Tyler and daughter Kelsey, began releasing performance videos of previously released originals and covers. Under the brand "Fogerty's Factory", the group performed remotely on The Late Show with Stephen Colbert, NPR's Tiny Desk Concerts, and SiriusXM's Classic Vinyl station. Collecting seven songs from the remote performances, the Fogerty's Factory EP was released on May 28, 2020, coinciding with his 75th birthday. A 12-track album edition featuring additional lockdown performances followed on November 20.

He performed backing vocals on "Scream and Shout", a single by his sons' band Hearty Har, released October 19, 2020.

On January 6, 2021, Fogerty released "Weeping in the Promised Land", a gospel-styled single, featuring sociopolitical commentary on Black Lives Matter, the COVID-19 pandemic, and Donald Trump.

On January 13, 2023, Fogerty announced on Twitter that he owns the rights to the CCR global catalog after a 50-year legal battle. He followed the announcement on August 22, 2025 with an album of re-recorded Creedence Clearwater Revival songs, titled Legacy: The Creedence Clearwater Revival Years. He performed a concert with his band on NPR's Tiny Desk on January 16, 2026.

== Personal life ==
John Fogerty married Martha Paiz in 1965 and had three children named Josh, Sean, and Laurie. They divorced in the late 1980s.

He met Julie Lebiedzinski (born Julie Lynne Kramer in Elkhart, Indiana, on February 7, 1960) in 1986 while on tour in Indianapolis, Indiana. They married in Elkhart, Indiana, on April 20, 1991, and have two sons, Shane and Tyler, and a daughter named Kelsy. Kramer has a daughter, Lyndsay, from a previous marriage. As of 2020, they live in Thousand Oaks, California.

Shane (guitar, vocals) and Tyler (vocals, guitar, percussion) often perform with their father in concert. All three of his youngest children appear in his YouTube channel videos.

Fogerty has a granddaughter who has also appeared in online videos with him.

In 2023, he bought a Hidden Hills estate from Sylvester Stallone for $17 million.

== Political views ==
Fogerty is a lifelong liberal Democrat. In his lyrics, Fogerty has lampooned many Republicans, including Richard Nixon and Ronald Reagan. Fogerty participated in the Vote for Change tour in support of John Kerry's 2004 presidential bid against George W. Bush. In 2015, Fogerty threw his support behind Democratic presidential candidate Hillary Clinton, saying, "[L]iberals tend to have the little guy in mind." However, he also expressed a liking for Donald Trump's "rebelliousness" and the appearance that Trump "can't be bought" because of his vast wealth.

Despite his personal views, Fogerty has attracted many conservative fans, including high-profiled ones like Bush, Trump, and Rush Limbaugh. Trump frequently used "Fortunate Son" during his 2020 reelection campaign, prompting Fogerty to issue a cease-and-desist letter.

== Band members ==
Current members

According to NPR and Fogerty's Facebook page, the current lineup of his band is known as the "Travelin' Band", named after the Fogerty-penned Creedence song of the same title. The current members of the group, other than John Fogerty and saxophonist Rob Stone, are also members of Shane and Tyler Fogerty's band, Hearty Har.

- John Fogerty - vocals, guitars, keyboards
- Shane Fogerty - backing vocals, rhythm guitar, percussion (2007–present)
- Tyler Fogerty - backing vocals, lead guitar (2007–present)
- Doug Lamothe - keyboards
- Jesse Noah Wilson - bass, backing vocals
- Richard "Richie" Millsap - drums, backing vocals
- Rob Stone - saxophone, percussion, backing vocals

Former members

- Kenny Aronoff - drums (1996-2018)

== Discography ==
- The Blue Ridge Rangers (1973)
- John Fogerty (1975)
- Centerfield (1985)
- Eye of the Zombie (1986)
- Blue Moon Swamp (1997)
- Deja Vu All Over Again (2004)
- Revival (2007)
- The Blue Ridge Rangers Rides Again (2009)
- Wrote a Song for Everyone (2013)
- Fogerty's Factory (2020)
- Legacy: The Creedence Clearwater Revival Years (2025)

Awards
Preceded by John Hiatt	AMA Lifetime Achievement Award for Songwriting; 2009	Succeeded by John Mellencamp
