= The Old Man Down the Road =

1984 single by John Fogerty

Single by John Fogerty

from the album Centerfield
- B-side: "Big Train (From Memphis)"
- Released: December 1984
- Recorded: 1984
- Genre: Swamp rock; roots rock
- Length: 3:32
- Label: Warner Bros.
- Songwriter: John Fogerty
- Producer: John Fogerty

John Fogerty singles chronology
"Almost Saturday Night" (1975)	"The Old Man Down the Road" (1984)	"Rock and Roll Girls"/"Centerfield" (1985)

Music video
- "The Old Man Down the Road" on YouTube

"The Old Man Down the Road" is a song by American rock artist John Fogerty. It was released in December 1984 as the lead single from Fogerty's comeback album, Centerfield. It became Fogerty's only top-10 hit single as a solo artist, peaking at number 10 on the US Billboard Hot 100, and spending three weeks at the number-one spot on the Billboard Top Rock Tracks chart. Rolling Stone Album Guide critic Paul Evans regards the song as "functional swamp rock". Billboard said that it shows that Fogerty is "still able to infuse a pulsing beat with deep-swamp mysteriousness." Cash Box called it "a hard-hitting roots rocker, which wastes no notes and pulls no punches."

== Music video ==
The video for the song features what appears to be, through a little trickery, an extended single camera sequence that follows a very long electric guitar cord through various scenes. Fogerty appears throughout the video - four times as himself (standing next to the couple having a picnic, past the cheerleader on the phone just past when the bikers pull up, near the woman hanging laundry, and at the end playing the guitar) and two other characters (the "backwoods" character at the beginning of the video and the old man with the dog in his lap towards the end of the video).

== Charts ==
=== Weekly charts ===
Chart (1984–1985)	Peak position
Australia (Kent Music Report)	10
Austria (Ö3 Austria Top 40)	12
Belgium (Ultratop 50 Flanders)	22
Canada Top Singles (RPM)	12
Netherlands (Single Top 100)	35
New Zealand (Recorded Music NZ)	11
Switzerland (Schweizer Hitparade)	27
UK Singles (Official Charts)	90
US Billboard Hot 100	10
US Mainstream Rock (Billboard)	1
West Germany (GfK)	49

=== Year-end charts ===
Chart (1985)	Position
Australia (Kent Music Report)	100

== Lawsuit ==
Saul Zaentz, owner of Fantasy Records claimed that "The Old Man Down the Road" shared the same chorus as "Run Through the Jungle", a song from Fogerty's days with Creedence Clearwater Revival years before. (Fogerty had relinquished copyrights and publishing rights of his Creedence songs to Zaentz and Fantasy, in exchange for release from his contractual obligations to them.) Zaentz sued (Fantasy, Inc. v. Fogerty), but the defendant Fogerty ultimately prevailed when he showed that the two songs were whole, separate, and distinct compositions. Bringing his guitar to the witness stand, he played excerpts from both songs, demonstrating that many songwriters (himself included) have distinctive styles that can make different compositions sound similar to less discerning ears.

After prevailing as defendant, Fogerty asked the court to require Zaentz to pay for the attorney fees he had spent to defend himself against the copyright infringement claim. In such (copyright) cases, the Court of Appeals for the Ninth Circuit required prevailing defendants seeking recompense to show that the original suit was frivolous or made in bad faith. This case, Fogerty v. Fantasy, Inc., became precedent when the U.S. Supreme Court (1993) overturned lower court rulings and decided that Fogerty could be awarded attorneys' fees without having to show that Zaentz's original suit was frivolous. The lower courts then decided that Fogerty should be awarded his attorney fees, totaling $1,347,519.15.

== See also ==
- List of Billboard Mainstream Rock number-one songs of the 1980s
