= Rockin' All Over the World =

1975 single by John Fogerty

- Dutch vinyl release

Single by John Fogerty

from the album John Fogerty
- B-side: "The Wall"
- Released: August 16, 1975
- Genre: Roots rock, rock and roll
- Length: 2:56
- Label: Asylum, Warner Bros.
- Songwriter: John Fogerty
- Producer: John Fogerty

John Fogerty singles chronology
"Comin' Down the Road" (1973)	"Rockin' All Over the World" (1975)	"Almost Saturday Night" (1975)

"Rockin' All Over the World" is a rock song written by John Fogerty, formerly of Creedence Clearwater Revival. It made its debut on Fogerty's second solo album in 1975. It was also released as a single, spending six weeks in the US top 40, peaking at #27.

Status Quo recorded their own, heavier arrangement of Fogerty's song for their 1977 album Rockin' All Over the World. The cover peaked at #3 in the UK Singles Chart and also charted in several other countries. In July 1985, Status Quo opened Live Aid at Wembley Stadium with "Rockin' All Over the World". Fogerty has given the cover a positive appraisal, occasionally making joking reference to it as the better-known version in introducing the song at UK gigs, and has talked about how the success of Status Quo's version came during a "very dark period" in his life and "made [him] feel much better". In an interview with Uncut magazine, he said that "it's wonderful to have a cover that's much better known than the original" and stated that he didn't mind that many people mistakenly believed that Status Quo wrote the song.

== Reception ==
Rolling Stone critic Dave Marsh considered the song a good choice for the album's lead single, although he claimed that it was "little more than the formulaic CCR sound with the title repeated over and over, like a chant." Billboard exclaimed "Good news for rock and roll fans. John Fogerty is back, capturing all the deceptively simple magic frantic feel that made Creedence a groundbreaking rock group in the '60s," praising the vocals, instrumentals and the title. Cash Box said that "every kid in town should sit up and take note of the simple drive, and cut out all that complicated crud."

== Status Quo version ==
"Rockin' All Over the World"
- Artwork for the UK vinyl release, also used for some international releases and the parent album of the same name

Single by Status Quo

from the album Rockin' All Over the World
- B-side: Ring of a Change
- Released: September 30, 1977
- Genre: Boogie rock
- Length: 3:33
- Label: Vertigo
- Songwriter: John Fogerty
- Producer: Pip Williams

Status Quo singles chronology
"Wild Side of Life" (1976)	"Rockin' All Over the World" (1977)	"Rockers Rollin' / Hold You Back" (1977)
Ain't Complaining (1988)	Running All Over the World (1988)	Burning Bridges (On and Off and On Again) (1988)

During the recording of Status Quo's music video to the song, bassist Alan Lancaster was living in Australia. He had refused to return to the UK for the recording, so he was replaced by a dummy with a bass guitar in the video. Quo's version was their 8th UK top ten hit, peaking at #3.

At Live Aid, Status Quo began their set (and thus the event itself, as they were the opening band) with "Rockin' All Over the World" which first became an unofficial anthem for the event when the BBC used it to advertise their TV coverage. Coldplay performed a portion of the song at Live 8, with lead singer Chris Martin singing the chorus during the song "In My Place", after much was made of Status Quo's absence from the concert in the British media.

The song has found widespread usage in the sports world. In 1988, to support Sport Aid, Status Quo re-recorded the song as "Running All Over the World" with slightly amended lyrics. It reached #17 in the UK Singles Chart. In the 21st century, Status Quo's 1977 rendition has become both an anthem of English football and European football more broadly, including as German side Bayer Leverkusen's post-goal track (a song played over the PA system whenever a goal is scored by the home team). The song is played over the PA system after England international matches, to which the crowd sings along. It is also popular as a crowd chant, with both original and modified lyrics, at various clubs around England, including Arsenal (modified, "Saka and Emile Smith Rowe"), Millwall (original) and Wrexham (modified, "Super Ben Foster In Goal"). The song was also adapted by England and Manchester United women's teams fans as "Tooney and Lessi Russo". Following Alessia Russo's transfer to Arsenal, Ella Toone admitted that she was upset to hear the chant modified as "Lotte and Lessi Russo" when Manchester United faced Arsenal. Bolton Wanderers uses the song whenever the home team wins their matches at home.

Another re-recorded version by Status Quo - a cover of the original 1977 record - appeared on their album Riffs in 2003. The song was reprised once again, in 2014, for Status Quo's thirty-first studio album, Aquostic (Stripped Bare), as an acoustic arrangement. It was featured in the ninety-minute launch performance of the album at London's Roundhouse on 22 October, the concert being recorded and broadcast live by BBC Radio 2 as part of their In Concert series.

=== Weekly charts ===
Chart (1977–1978)	Peak position
Austria (Ö3 Austria Top 40)	22
Belgium (Ultratop 50 Flanders)	18
Belgium (Ultratop 50 Wallonia)	38
French Singles (SNEP)	32
Germany (GfK)	7
Ireland (IRMA)	1
Netherlands (Single Top 100)	11
New Zealand (Recorded Music NZ)	29
Switzerland (Schweizer Hitparade)	3
UK Singles (Official Charts)	3

=== Certifications ===
Region	Certification	Certified units/sales
New Zealand (RMNZ)	Gold	15,000^{‡}
United Kingdom (BPI)	Platinum	600,000^{‡}
^{‡} Sales+streaming figures based on certification alone.
