= Run Through the Jungle =

Single by Creedence Clearwater Revival

from the album Cosmo's Factory
- A-side: "Up Around the Bend"
- Released: April 1970
- Recorded: March 1970, Wally Heider's Studio, San Francisco, California
- Genre: Blues rock; swamp rock; psychedelic rock
- Length: 3:05
- Label: Fantasy Records
- Songwriter: John Fogerty
- Producer: John Fogerty

Creedence Clearwater Revival singles chronology
"Up Around The Bend" (1970)	"Run Through the Jungle" (1970)	"Lookin' Out My Back Door" (1970)

Audio sample
- "Run Through the Jungle": file; help

"Run Through the Jungle" is a 1970 song by American rock band Creedence Clearwater Revival (CCR). It was released as a double A-side single with "Up Around the Bend" and on the album Cosmo's Factory.

== History ==
The song was written by CCR's lead singer, guitarist, and songwriter, John Fogerty. It was included on their 1970 album Cosmo's Factory, the group's fifth album. The song's title and lyrics, as well as the year it was released (1970), have led many to assume that the song is about the Vietnam War. The fact that previous Creedence Clearwater Revival songs such as "Fortunate Son" were protests of the Vietnam War added to this belief. In a 2016 interview, though, Fogerty explained that the song is actually about the proliferation of guns in the United States.

The thing I wanted to talk about was gun control and the proliferation of guns... I remember reading around that time that there was one gun for every man, woman, and child in America, which I found staggering. So somewhere in the song, I think I said, '200 million guns are loaded.' Not that anyone else has the answer, but I did not have the answer to the question; I just had the question. I just thought it was disturbing that it was such a jungle for our citizens just to walk around in our own country at least having to be aware that there are so many private guns owned by some responsible and maybe many irresponsible people.

The song's opening and closing both featured jungle sound effects created by, according to the band's bassist Stu Cook, "lots of backwards recorded guitar and piano." The harmonica part on the song was played by John Fogerty. The song was also Tom Fogerty's favorite CCR song: "My all-time favorite Creedence tune was 'Run Through the Jungle'. . . . It's like a little movie in itself with all the sound effects. It never changes key, but it holds your interest the whole time. It's like a musician's dream. It never changes key, yet you get the illusion it does."

Record World called the single with "Up Around the Bend" a "two-sided monster". Cash Box said that the double-sided single "takes the act out of its sustained bag of either Little Richard or 'bayou-tagged' music", but that compared to "Up Around the Bend", this song "presents a less-removed glimpse of the familiar Creedence."

Ultimate Classic Rock critic Bryan Wawzenek rated the lyrics of "Run Through the Jungle" as Fogerty's eighth-greatest, saying, "Fogerty has written many songs cloaked in ominous foreboding...But the danger in the song feels just a little more imminent, especially when you’ve got Satan on your tail."

== Controversy ==
The song was later the subject of controversy when Saul Zaentz, the boss of CCR's record label, Fantasy Records, which once owned the distribution and publishing rights to the music of Creedence Clearwater Revival, brought a series of lawsuits against John Fogerty, including a claim that the music from Fogerty's 1984 song "The Old Man Down the Road" was too similar to "Run Through the Jungle." Zaentz won some of his claims against Fogerty, but lost on the copyright issue (Fantasy, Inc. v. Fogerty). The judge found that a songwriter cannot plagiarize himself. After winning the case, Fogerty sued Zaentz for the cost of defending himself against the copyright infringement claim. In such (copyright) cases, prevailing defendants seeking recompense are bound to show that the original suit was frivolous or made in bad faith.

Fogerty v. Fantasy, Inc. became precedent when the United States Supreme Court (1993) overturned lower court rulings and awarded attorneys' fees to Fogerty, without Fogerty having to show that Zaentz's original suit was frivolous.

== In popular culture ==
The song was recorded by punk blues-punk rock band The Gun Club, and is on Miami (The Gun Club album), released in 1982 on Animal Records.

"Run Through the Jungle" has appeared in films such as Air America (1990), My Girl (1991), Rudy (1993), The Big Lebowski (1998), Radio Arrow (1998), Tropic Thunder (2008), The Sapphires (2012), Kong: Skull Island (2017), Triple Frontier (2019), the trailer for Jungle Cruise (2021), and Primitive War (2025)

In literature, the song has been referenced in Stephen King & Peter Straub's novel The Talisman.

In television, the song is used in season three, episode one of Hardcastle and McCormick, season two of Fargo, season one, episode eight of Lethal Weapon, and season four, episode 19 of the 2018 TV series Magnum P.I.

The song has appeared in many video games that depict the Vietnam War, notably licensed for Rising Storm 2: Vietnam and in the reveal trailers for Call of Duty: Black Ops Cold War and Mafia 3.

== Certifications ==
Certifications for "Run Through the Jungle"
Region	Certification	Certified units/sales
New Zealand (RMNZ)	Platinum	30,000^{‡}
^{‡} Sales+streaming figures based on certification alone.
