= List of songs recorded by Creedence Clearwater Revival =

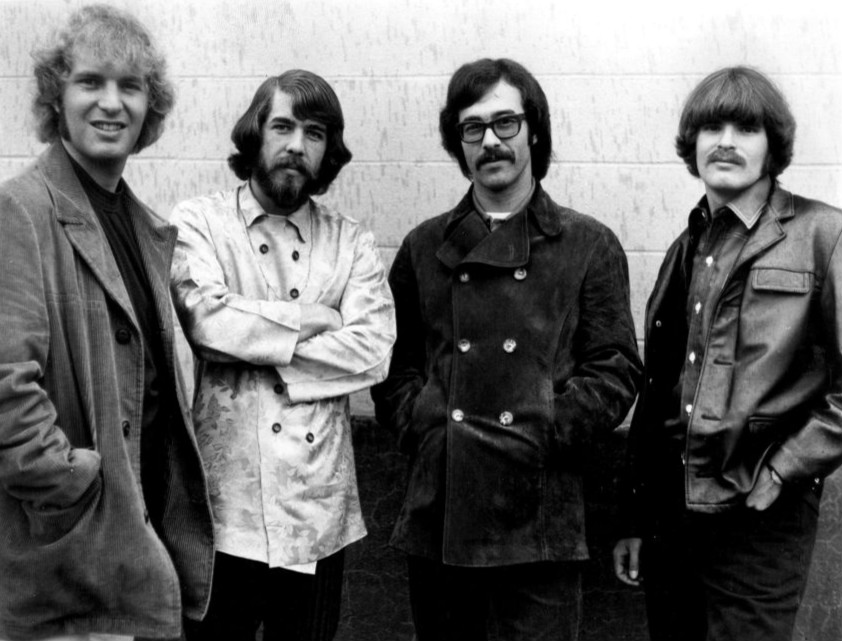
Creedence Clearwater Revival in 1968. L-R: Tom Fogerty, Doug Clifford, Stu Cook, and John Fogerty.

A list of songs recorded by American rock band Creedence Clearwater Revival.

== List ==
Key
†	Indicates songs not solely written by John Fogerty

Name of song, writer(s), original release, and year of release
Song	Writer(s)	Original release	Year	Ref.
"45 Revolutions Per Minute" (Note: "45 Revolutions Per Minute" was released in two parts.)	John Fogerty	Pendulum (40th Anniversary Edition)	2008	
"Bad Moon Rising"	John Fogerty	Green River	1969	
"Before You Accuse Me"	Ellas McDaniel †	Cosmo's Factory	1970	
"Bootleg"	John Fogerty	Bayou Country	1969	
"Born on the Bayou"	John Fogerty	Bayou Country	1969	
"Born to Move"	John Fogerty	Pendulum	1970	
"Broken Spoke Shuffle"	John Fogerty	Green River (40th Anniversary Edition)	2008	
"Call It Pretending"	John Fogerty	Non-album single B-side of "Porterville"	1967	
"Chameleon"	John Fogerty	Pendulum	1970	
"Commotion"	John Fogerty	Green River	1969	
"Cotton Fields"	Huddie Ledbetter †	Willy and the Poor Boys	1969	
"Cross-Tie Walker"	John Fogerty	Green River	1969	
"Don't Look Now (It Ain't You or Me)"	John Fogerty	Willy and the Poor Boys	1969	
"Door to Door"	Stu Cook †	Mardi Gras	1972	
"Down on the Corner"	John Fogerty	Willy and the Poor Boys	1969	
"Effigy"	John Fogerty	Willy and the Poor Boys	1969	
"Feelin' Blue"	John Fogerty	Willy and the Poor Boys	1969	
"Fortunate Son"	John Fogerty	Willy and the Poor Boys	1969	
"Get Down Woman"	John Fogerty	Creedence Clearwater Revival	1968	
"Gloomy"	John Fogerty	Creedence Clearwater Revival	1968	
"Glory Be"	John Fogerty	Green River (40th Anniversary Edition)	2008	
"Good Golly, Miss Molly"	Robert Blackwell; John Marascalco †	Bayou Country	1969	
"Graveyard Train"	John Fogerty	Bayou Country	1969	
"Green River"	John Fogerty	Green River	1969	
"Have You Ever Seen the Rain?"	John Fogerty	Pendulum	1970	
"Hello Mary Lou"	Gene Pitney; Cayet Mangiaracina †	Mardi Gras	1972	
"Hey Tonight"	John Fogerty	Pendulum	1970	
"I Heard It Through the Grapevine"	Norman Whitfield; Barrett Strong †	Cosmo's Factory	1970	
"I Put a Spell on You"	Screamin' Jay Hawkins †	Creedence Clearwater Revival	1968	
"It Came Out of the Sky"	John Fogerty	Willy and the Poor Boys	1969	
"It's Just a Thought"	John Fogerty	Pendulum	1970	
"Keep on Chooglin'"	John Fogerty	Bayou Country	1969	
"Lodi"	John Fogerty	Green River	1969	
"Long as I Can See the Light"	John Fogerty	Cosmo's Factory	1970	
"Lookin' for a Reason"	John Fogerty	Mardi Gras	1972	
"Lookin' Out My Back Door"	John Fogerty	Cosmo's Factory	1970	
"The Midnight Special"	Traditional arr. John Fogerty †	Willy and the Poor Boys	1969	
"Molina"	John Fogerty	Pendulum	1970	
"My Baby Left Me"	Arthur Crudup †	Cosmo's Factory	1970	
"Need Someone to Hold"	Stu Cook; Doug Clifford †	Mardi Gras	1972	
"The Night Time Is the Right Time"	Nappy Brown; Ozzie Cadena; Lew Herman †	Green River	1969	
"Ninety-Nine and a Half (Won't Do)"	Steve Cropper; Eddie Floyd; Wilson Pickett †	Creedence Clearwater Revival	1968	
"Ooby Dooby"	Wade Moore; Dick Penner †	Cosmo's Factory	1970	
"Pagan Baby"	John Fogerty	Pendulum	1970	
"Penthouse Pauper"	John Fogerty	Bayou Country	1969	
"Poorboy Shuffle"	John Fogerty	Willy and the Poor Boys	1969	
"Porterville"	John Fogerty	Creedence Clearwater Revival	1968	
"Proud Mary"	John Fogerty	Bayou Country	1969	
"Ramble Tamble"	John Fogerty	Cosmo's Factory	1970	
"Rude Awakening #2"	John Fogerty	Pendulum	1970	
"Run Through the Jungle"	John Fogerty	Cosmo's Factory	1970	
"Sail Away"	Stu Cook †	Mardi Gras	1972	
"Sailor's Lament"	John Fogerty	Pendulum	1970	
"Side o' the Road"	John Fogerty	Willy and the Poor Boys	1969	
"Sinister Purpose"	John Fogerty	Green River	1969	
"Someday Never Comes"	John Fogerty	Mardi Gras	1972	
"Suzie Q"	Dale Hawkins; Robert Chaisson; Stan Lewis; Eleanor Broadwater †	Creedence Clearwater Revival	1968	
"Sweet Hitch-Hiker"	John Fogerty	Mardi Gras	1972	
"Take It Like a Friend"	Stu Cook †	Mardi Gras	1972	
"Tearin' Up the Country"	Doug Clifford †	Mardi Gras	1972	
"Tombstone Shadow"	John Fogerty	Green River	1969	
"Travelin' Band"	John Fogerty	Cosmo's Factory	1970	
"Up Around the Bend"	John Fogerty	Cosmo's Factory	1970	
"Walk On the Water"	John Fogerty; Tom Fogerty †	Creedence Clearwater Revival	1968	
"What Are You Gonna Do"	Doug Clifford †	Mardi Gras	1972	
"Who'll Stop the Rain"	John Fogerty	Cosmo's Factory	1970	
"(Wish I Could) Hideaway"	John Fogerty	Pendulum	1970	
"The Working Man"	John Fogerty	Creedence Clearwater Revival	1968	
"Wrote a Song for Everyone"	John Fogerty	Green River	1969	
