= Chronicle: The 20 Greatest Hits =

Greatest hits album by Creedence Clearwater Revival
- Released: January 1976
- Recorded: 1968–1972
- Genre: Americana; swamp rock
- Length: 67:55
- Label: Fantasy
- Producer: John Fogerty

Creedence Clearwater Revival chronology
More Creedence Gold (1973)	Chronicle: The 20 Greatest Hits (1976)	20 Golden Greats (1979)

Chronicle, or fully Chronicle: The 20 Greatest Hits, is a greatest hits album by the American rock band Creedence Clearwater Revival. It was released in January 1976 by Fantasy Records. The edited version of "I Heard It Through the Grapevine" featured on the album was simultaneously released as a single.

Chronicle is a singles collection with 13 A-sides and seven B-sides. Unlike the two previously released Creedence Gold compilations, Chronicle includes all of the group's charted hits. Chronicle: Volume Two was released in 1986, and features non-charting "classics" collected from the same albums as the songs on Chronicle.

Certified 12× Platinum by the Recording Industry Association of America (RIAA), it is the best-selling album in the band's catalog. The compilation was ranked number 59 on Rolling Stone's list of the 500 greatest albums of all time in 2012, but disappeared from the list altogether when it was published again in 2020. The album has sold at least 6 million copies in the US since 1991 (data from 2013), when Nielsen SoundScan began tracking sales for Billboard. It has remained on the Billboard 200 chart for 12 years, reaching the 600 week-mark (non-consecutive) in August 2022. In June 2025 it broke the 750-week mark. The album was re-released on vinyl in 2014 as a limited edition.

== Critical reception ==
Professional ratings
Review scores
Source	Rating
AllMusic	5/5 stars
Blender	5/5 stars
Robert Christgau	A
Rolling Stone	5/5 stars

For his review of Chronicle for AllMusic, Stephen Thomas Erlewine said that the album was suitably compiled, but he did not like how the Compact Disc reissue had the full-length version of "I Heard It Through the Grapevine," saying it does not fit with the other songs on the collection. Blender magazine's review called Chronicle the group's best compilation. Robert Christgau called the album a good starting-point for Creedence fans.

== Track listing ==
All tracks are written by J. C. Fogerty, except where noted.

Chronicle: The 20 Greatest Hits track listing
No.	Title	Album	Length
1.	"Suzie Q" (Dale Hawkins)	Creedence Clearwater Revival (1968)	4:36
2.	"I Put a Spell on You" (Screamin' Jay Hawkins, Herb Slotkin)	Creedence Clearwater Revival	4:32
3.	"Proud Mary"	Bayou Country (1969)	3:08
4.	"Bad Moon Rising"	Green River (1969)	2:19
5.	"Lodi"	Green River	3:10
6.	"Green River"	Green River	2:33
7.	"Commotion"	Green River	2:42
8.	"Down on the Corner"	Willy and the Poor Boys (1969)	2:45
9.	"Fortunate Son"	Willy and the Poor Boys	2:20
10.	"Travelin' Band"	Cosmo's Factory (1970)	2:08
11.	"Who'll Stop the Rain"	Cosmo's Factory	2:28
12.	"Up Around the Bend"	Cosmo's Factory	2:42
13.	"Run Through the Jungle"	Cosmo's Factory	3:07
14.	"Lookin' out My Back Door"	Cosmo's Factory	2:33
15.	"Long As I Can See the Light"	Cosmo's Factory	3:31
16.	"I Heard It Through the Grapevine" (Norman Whitfield, Barrett Strong)	Cosmo's Factory	11:04
17.	"Have You Ever Seen the Rain?"	Pendulum (1970)	2:38
18.	"Hey Tonight"	Pendulum	2:43
19.	"Sweet Hitch-Hiker"	Mardi Gras (1972)	2:56
20.	"Someday Never Comes"	Mardi Gras	4:00
Total length:			67:55

These times are for the CD version. The vinyl LP version has the single version of "I Heard It Through the Grapevine" instead of the longer album version.

== Personnel ==
Per liner notes.

- John Fogerty – vocals, lead guitar, production, arrangements
- Stu Cook – bass
- Doug Clifford – drums
- Tom Fogerty – rhythm guitar (except “Sweet Hitch-Hiker” and “Someday Never Comes”)

== Charts ==
=== Weekly charts ===
Weekly chart performance for Chronicle: The 20 Greatest Hits
Chart (1976–2024)	Peak position
Australian Albums (ARIA)	16
Austrian Albums (Ö3 Austria)	60
Belgian Albums (Ultratop Flanders)	137
Belgian Albums (Ultratop Wallonia)	94
Canadian Albums (Billboard)	31
Dutch Albums (Album Top 100)	8
German Albums (Offizielle Top 100)	50
Irish Albums (IRMA)	72
Italian Albums (FIMI)	98
New Zealand Albums (RMNZ)	2
Norwegian Albums (VG-lista)	40
Swedish Albums (Sverigetopplistan)	59
UK Albums (OCC)	35
US Billboard 200	18
US Top Catalog Albums (Billboard)	1
US Digital Albums (Billboard)	2
US Independent Albums (Billboard)	3
US Top Rock Albums (Billboard)	3

=== Year-end charts ===
Year-end chart performance for Chronicle: The 20 Greatest Hits
Chart (2009)	Position
Australian Albums (ARIA)	72

Chart (2010)	Position
US Billboard 200	157

Chart (2011)	Position
US Billboard 200	151

Chart (2012)	Position
US Billboard 200	142

Chart (2013)	Position
US Billboard 200	184

Chart (2015)	Position
US Billboard 200	163

Chart (2016)	Position
US Billboard 200	156

Chart (2017)	Position
US Billboard 200	133
US Top Rock Albums (Billboard)	19

Chart (2018)	Position
US Billboard 200	93
US Top Rock Albums (Billboard)	10

Chart (2019)	Position
US Billboard 200	65
US Top Rock Albums (Billboard)	8

Chart (2020)	Position
Canadian Albums (Billboard)	49
US Billboard 200	63
US Top Rock Albums (Billboard)	4

Chart (2021)	Position
Canadian Albums (Billboard)	29
US Billboard 200	47
US Top Rock Albums (Billboard)	5

Chart (2022)	Position
Canadian Albums (Billboard)	33
US Billboard 200	55
US Top Rock Albums (Billboard)	5

Chart (2023)	Position
Canadian Albums (Billboard)	21
US Billboard 200	39
US Independent Albums (Billboard)	7
US Top Rock Albums (Billboard)	5

Chart (2024)	Position
Australian Albums (ARIA)	70
Canadian Albums (Billboard)	21
US Billboard 200	40

Chart (2025)	Position
Canadian Albums (Billboard)	36
US Billboard 200	58

== Certifications ==
Certifications for Chronicle: The 20 Greatest Hits
Region	Certification	Certified units/sales
Argentina (CAPIF)	Gold	30,000^{^}
Australia (ARIA)	6× Platinum	420,000^{‡}
Belgium (BRMA)	Gold	25,000^{*}
Canada (Music Canada)	Gold	50,000^{^}
Germany (BVMI)	Gold	250,000^{^}
Italy (FIMI)	Gold	25,000^{*}
New Zealand (RMNZ)	Gold	7,500^{^}
United Kingdom (BPI)	Gold	100,000^{^}
United States (RIAA)	12× Platinum	12,000,000^{‡}
^{*} Sales figures based on certification alone.^{^} Shipments figures based on certification alone.^{‡} Sales+streaming figures based on certification alone.
