= More Creedence Gold =

Compilation album by Creedence Clearwater Revival
- Released: April 1973
- Length: 39:18
- Label: Fantasy Records

Creedence Clearwater Revival chronology
Creedence Gold (1972)	More Creedence Gold (1973)	Live in Europe (1973)

Professional ratings
Review scores
Source	Rating
Christgau's Record Guide	B

More Creedence Gold is an album by the band Creedence Clearwater Revival and was released in 1973. It is the follow-up to the album Creedence Gold, which was released in 1972.

The two Gold compilations combined are incomplete in terms of charted hits as "Green River", "Commotion", "Travelin' Band", "Long as I Can See the Light" and "Someday Never Comes" do not appear in either volume.

== Track listing ==
All tracks are written by John Fogerty, except where noted.

Side 1
No.	Title	Original album	Length
1.	"Hey Tonight"	Pendulum (1970)	2:43
2.	"Run Through the Jungle"	Cosmo's Factory (1970)	3:05
3.	"Fortunate Son"	Willy and the Poor Boys (1969)	2:18
4.	"Bootleg"	Bayou Country (1969)	3:02
5.	"Lookin' Out My Back Door"	Cosmo's Factory	2:32
6.	"Molina"	Pendulum	2:42
7.	"Who'll Stop the Rain"	Cosmo's Factory	2:27

Side 2
No.	Title	Original album	Length
1.	"Sweet Hitch-Hiker"	Mardi Gras (1972)	2:56
2.	"Good Golly Miss Molly" (Robert "Bumps" Blackwell, John Marascalco)	Bayou Country	2:40
3.	"I Put a Spell on You" (Screamin' Jay Hawkins)	Creedence Clearwater Revival (1968)	4:31
4.	"Don't Look Now (It Ain't You or Me)"	Willy and the Poor Boys	2:09
5.	"Lodi"	Green River (1969)	3:10
6.	"Porterville"	Creedence Clearwater Revival	2:22
7.	"Up Around the Bend"	Cosmo's Factory	2:41

== Personnel ==
- Doug Clifford - drums
- Stu Cook - bass
- John Fogerty - lead guitar, harmonica, lead vocals
- Tom Fogerty - rhythm guitar, backing vocals (except Side 2, track 1)
