= Have You Ever Seen the Rain =

1971 single by Creedence Clearwater Revival

Single by Creedence Clearwater Revival

from the album Pendulum
- B-side: "Hey Tonight"
- Released: January 1971
- Recorded: 1970
- Genre: Roots rock; country rock; swamp rock
- Length: 2:39
- Label: Fantasy
- Songwriter: John Fogerty
- Producer: John Fogerty

Creedence Clearwater Revival singles chronology
"Lookin' Out My Back Door" (1970)	"Have You Ever Seen the Rain" (1971)	"Sweet Hitch-Hiker" (1971)

Music video
- "Creedence Clearwater Revival - Have You Ever Seen The Rain (Official)" on YouTube

"Have You Ever Seen the Rain" is a song by the American rock band Creedence Clearwater Revival, written by John Fogerty and released as a single in January 1971 from the album Pendulum (1970). The song charted highest in Canada, reaching number one on the RPM 100 national singles chart in March 1971. In the U.S., it peaked at number eight on the Billboard Hot 100 singles chart the same year.

On the Cash Box pop chart, it peaked at number three. In the UK, it reached number 36. It was the group's eighth gold-selling single. Cash Box called the song "as close to a ballad as anything from CCR." In March 2023, the song surpassed one billion streams on Spotify.

Fogerty released a live version of the song on his The Long Road Home – In Concert DVD which was recorded at the Wiltern Theatre in Los Angeles, California, on September 15, 2005. On the 2013 John Fogerty album Wrote a Song for Everyone, a new recording of the song featuring Alan Jackson was included.

For the band's 50th anniversary, Craft Recordings released an official music video for the song. Directed by Laurence Harlan Jacobs and filmed entirely in Montana, the video stars Sasha Frolova, Jack Quaid, and Erin Moriarty.

== Lyrics ==
In his review of the song for AllMusic, Mark Deming suggests that "Have You Ever Seen the Rain" is about the decline of the countercultural political idealism of the 1960s during the Nixon administration, in light of events such as the Altamont Free Concert and the Kent State shootings. However, John Fogerty has said in interviews and prior to playing the song in concert that it concerns tensions within Creedence Clearwater Revival themselves and the imminent departure of his brother Tom Fogerty from the band.

"That song is really about the impending breakup of Creedence. The imagery is, you can have a bright, beautiful, sunny day, and it can be raining at the same time," Fogerty told Rolling Stone magazine in 1993.

In a 2020 interview with American Songwriter, Fogerty stated that the line "Have you ever seen the rain, coming down on a sunny day?" was inspired by the band's feelings of unease and depression at the height of their fame and commercial success. The band would ultimately split in October 1972, following the release of the album Mardi Gras.

In a literal sense, the song describes a sunshower, such as in the lyric "It'll rain a sunny day" and the chorus, "Have you ever seen the rain, comin' down on a sunny day?" These events are particularly common in the Deep South due to localized atmospheric wind shear effects.

== Music video ==
For the band's 50th anniversary in 2018, a music video was released for "Have You Ever Seen the Rain". The video stars then up-and-coming actors including Jack Quaid, Sasha Frolova, and Erin Moriarty. The video was shot in Montana by director Laurence Harlan Jacobs who described it as "a coming-of-age story... something distinctly real that encapsulates identity. Not teenage years, but specifically your early 20s when you're still growing and trying to become someone." The story, co-written by Jacobs and Montana-born Luke Klompien, is of "three best friends hanging in Montana until one of them moves away". It includes scenes of the cast skipping rocks into the river, driving through the countryside in a vintage red Chevy pickup truck, watching the sunset, and bonding by the fire. A behind-the-scenes documentary about the making of the video was released June 26, 2019, featuring interviews with the cast and director, and also shows dialogue between the actors on set.

== Charts ==
=== Weekly charts ===
1971 weekly chart performance for "Have You Ever Seen the Rain"
Chart (1971)	Peak position
Argentina (Prensario)	10
Australia (Go-Set)	6
Austria	6
Belgium (Ultratop)	6
Brazil (IBOPE)	8
Canada RPM Top Singles	1
Japan (Music Labo Co.)	14
Netherlands (Radio Veronica)	9
Malaysia (Radio Malaysia)	1
New Zealand (Listener)	2
Norway (Verdens Gang)	3
Singapore (Rediffusion)	5
South Africa (Springbok Radio)	1
Sweden (Radio Sweden)	8
UK (Record Retailer)	36
US Billboard Hot 100	8
US Cash Box Top 100	3

2021 weekly chart performance for "Have You Ever Seen the Rain"
Chart (2021)	Peak position
Canada Digital Song Sales (Billboard)	1
US Rock Digital Song Sales (Billboard)	1
US Digital Song Sales (Billboard)	7
US Hot Rock & Alternative Songs (Billboard)	10

2023–2024 weekly chart performance for "Have You Ever Seen the Rain"
Chart (2023–2025)	Peak position
Global 200 (Billboard)	92
Sweden (Sverigetopplistan)	87
UK Independent (Official Charts)	15

=== Year-end charts ===
1971 year-end chart performance for "Have You Ever Seen the Rain"
Chart (1971)	Rank
Australia	40
Canada	13
South Africa	14
US Cash Box	60

2023 year-end chart performance for "Have You Ever Seen the Rain"
Chart (2023)	Rank
New Zealand (Recorded Music NZ)	43

2024 year-end chart performance for "Have You Ever Seen the Rain"
Chart (2024)	Position
Australia (ARIA)	95
Global 200 (Billboard)	121
Netherlands (Single Top 100)	95

== Certifications and sales ==
Certifications and sales for "Have You Ever Seen the Rain"
Region	Certification	Certified units/sales
Australia (ARIA)	8× Platinum	560,000^{‡}
Brazil (Pro-Música Brasil)	Gold	30,000^{‡}
Denmark (IFPI Danmark)	2× Platinum	180,000^{‡}
Germany (BVMI)	Gold	250,000^{‡}
Italy (FIMI) sales since 2009	Platinum	50,000^{‡}
New Zealand (RMNZ)	10× Platinum	300,000^{‡}
Portugal (AFP)	2× Platinum	20,000^{‡}
South Africa	—	100,000
Spain (Promusicae)	3× Platinum	180,000^{‡}
United Kingdom (BPI) 2005 release	Platinum	600,000^{‡}
United States (RIAA)	8× Platinum	8,000,000^{‡}
^{‡} Sales+streaming figures based on certification alone.

== Bonnie Tyler version ==
"Have You Ever Seen the Rain?"

Single by Bonnie Tyler

from the album Faster Than the Speed of Night
- B-side: "Time"
- Released: 17 June 1983
- Genre: Pop rock
- Length: 4:08
- Label: CBS; Columbia
- Songwriter: John Fogerty
- Producers: Jim Steinman; John Jansen

Bonnie Tyler singles chronology
"Faster Than the Speed of Night" (1983)	"Have You Ever Seen the Rain?" (1983)	"Straight from the Heart" (1983)

Music video
- "Bonnie Tyler - Have You Ever Seen the Rain? (Video)" on YouTube

Welsh singer Bonnie Tyler covered the song on her 1983 album Faster Than the Speed of Night. The track was released as the album's third single in June 1983.

=== Charts ===
Chart performance for "Have You Ever Seen the Rain?" by Bonnie Tyler
Chart (1983)	Peak position
Australia (Kent Music Report)	69
Ireland (IRMA)	13
UK Singles (Official Charts)	47
West Germany (GfK)	63

== Other cover versions ==
- Boney M. covered the song on their 1977 album Love for Sale.
- Johnny Cash covered the song for his 1985 album Rainbow.
- Joan Jett and the Blackhearts covered the song on their 1990 album The Hit List.
- Rod Stewart included the song on his 2006 covers album Still the Same... Great Rock Classics of Our Time.
- Willie Nelson and his daughter Paula Nelson covered the song for his 2013 album To All the Girls...

=== Versions in other languages ===
Spanish

- Laureano Brizuela – "Cerca de ti"
- Ana Gabriel – "Ven a ver Llover"
- Juan Gabriel – "Have You Ever Seen the Rain (Gracias al Sol)"
- Karina – "Quiero saber"

Portuguese

- The Fevers – Não Devo Mais Ficar
- Gilberto e Gilmar – Não Devo Mais Ficar
- KLB – Não Devo Mais Ficar
- Paulo Ricardo – Eu Não Devo Mais Ficar

== See also ==
- List of best-selling singles
