= Deja Vu (All Over Again) =

2004 song by John Fogerty

Single by John Fogerty

from the album Deja Vu All Over Again
- Released: 2004
- Genre: Roots rock; folk rock; swamp rock; protest song
- Length: 4:13
- Label: DreamWorks
- Songwriter: John Fogerty
- Producer: John Fogerty

"Deja Vu (All Over Again)" is a song by American rock singer/songwriter John Fogerty. It is the title track, opening track and lead single to his 2004 album. The song reached #4 on the Billboard Adult Alternative chart.

== History ==
Fogerty wrote this song about the similarities between the Vietnam War and the war in Iraq. He believed the US government was making the same mistakes again. The song started to evolve in 2002 or early 2003. Fogerty stated that "Deja Vu (All Over Again)" is not a political song, but a description about the sadness caused by human losses in the war; musically and thematically it is similar to CCR's classics "Have You Ever Seen the Rain?" and "Who'll Stop the Rain".

== Live performances ==
The song was played live for the first time at John Kerry-John Edwards Fundraising at Radio City Music Hall, New York, on July 8, 2004. It was changed from an electric band version to an acoustic solo performance in 2005; the acoustic rendition also appears on the Long Road Home DVD filmed at Wiltern Theatre, Los Angeles, on September 15, 2005 and on the live album The Long Road Home - In Concert, released in 2006. "Deja Vu (All Over Again)" was performed live 195 times totally.

== See also ==
- List of anti-war songs
