= Creedence Gold =

Compilation album by Creedence Clearwater Revival
- Released: November 1972
- Length: 39:50
- Label: Fantasy Records

Creedence Clearwater Revival chronology
Mardi Gras (1972)	Creedence Gold (1972)	More Creedence Gold (1973)

Creedence Gold is a compilation album of the band Creedence Clearwater Revival released in 1972. More Creedence Gold formed the second part, released in 1973.

The original vinyl release featured pictures of the band under the colored profile flaps on the cover. Overseas releases switched the cover art, with the band photo on the front, and the colored silhouettes on the back.

A quadraphonic version of this album was released on both vinyl and 8-track cartridge formats, and is considered one of the rarest quadraphonic releases.

== Track listing ==
Professional ratings
Review scores
Source	Rating
Christgau's Record Guide	B+

All tracks are written by John Fogerty, except where noted.

Side 1
No.	Title	Original album	Length
1.	"Proud Mary"	Bayou Country (1969)	3:07
2.	"Down on the Corner"	Willy and the Poor Boys (1969)	2:43
3.	"Bad Moon Rising"	Green River (1969)	2:17
4.	"I Heard It Through the Grapevine" (Norman Whitfield, Barrett Strong)	Cosmo's Factory (1970)	11:05

Side 2
No.	Title	Original album	Length
1.	"The Midnight Special" (Traditional; arr. J. C. Fogerty)	Willy and the Poor Boys	4:10
2.	"Have You Ever Seen the Rain?"	Pendulum (1970)	2:38
3.	"Born on the Bayou"	Bayou Country	5:10
4.	"Suzie Q" (Dale Hawkins, Stan Lewis, Eleanor Broadwater)	Creedence Clearwater Revival (1968)	8:34

== Personnel ==
- Doug Clifford – drums
- Stu Cook – bass
- John Fogerty – lead guitar, harmonica, lead vocals
- Tom Fogerty – rhythm guitar, backing vocals
