= Premonition (John Fogerty album) =

Live album & DVD by John Fogerty
- Released: June 9, 1998
- Recorded: December 12 & December 13, 1997
- Genres: Roots rock, swamp rock, southern rock, heartland rock, country rock
- Length: 68:33 (CD) / 89:03 (DVD)
- Labels: Reprise (First Pressing); Geffen (Second Pressing); BMG (Latest Pressing)
- Producer: John Fogerty

John Fogerty chronology
Blue Moon Swamp (1997)	Premonition (1998)	Deja Vu All Over Again (2004)

Professional ratings
Review scores
Source	Rating
AllMusic	4/5 stars

Premonition is the first live album released by John Fogerty as a solo artist. He performs many hits by his earlier band, Creedence Clearwater Revival, as well as songs composed as a solo artist. It was recorded with a live audience at Warner Bros. Studios Stage 15 on December 12 & 13, 1997, and is available on CD and DVD (with four additional tracks on the DVD).

== History ==
After years of battling with Creedence Clearwater Revival, and feeling disgruntled about his publishing, Fogerty finally started to play the old Creedence songs again, something he stayed away from for many years. In 1987, Fogerty joined George Harrison, Bob Dylan and others onstage at a late night jam session at the Palomino Club. During the performance, Dylan asked Fogerty to play "Proud Mary". Dylan managed to get Fogerty to play the song, something Fogerty commented about on The Tonight Show sometime later.

Fogerty played a Vietnam tribute concert in 1987, and during that show, he played a few of the old Creedence songs for the first time as a solo artist. During the entire Eye of the Zombie tour, Fogerty refused to play any of his older material. In 1988, during the ceremony of the Rock and Roll Hall of Fame, Fogerty was asked to play "Long Tall Sally" but as Little Richard had gone, he proposed to play one of his own tunes, "Born on the Bayou".

== Track listing ==
1. "Born on the Bayou"
2. "Green River"
3. "Susie Q"
4. "I Put a Spell on You"
5. "Bring It Down to Jelly Roll"
6. "Who'll Stop the Rain"
7. "Premonition"
8. "A Hundred and Ten in the Shade"
9. "Almost Saturday Night"
10. "Rockin' All Over the World"
11. "Joy of My Life"
12. "Down on the Corner"
13. "Centerfield"
14. "Swamp River Days"
15. "Hot Rod Heart"
16. "The Old Man Down the Road"
17. "Blueboy"
18. "Walking in a Hurricane"
19. "Bad Moon Rising"
20. "Fortunate Son"
21. "Proud Mary"
22. "Travelin' Band"

"Bring it Down to Jelly Roll," "A Hundred and Ten in the Shade," "Blueboy" and "Walking in a Hurricane" were not included on the CD edition.

== Personnel ==
- John Fogerty – guitar, vocals
- Johnny Lee Schell – guitar, backing vocals
- Michael Canipe – guitar, backing vocals
- Bob Glaub – bass
- Kenny Aronoff – drums
- Julia Waters, Maxine Waters and Oren Waters – backing vocals on "Premonition", "Almost Saturday Night" and "Down on the Corner"
- The Fairfield Four – backing vocals on "The Midnight Special" and "A Hundred and Ten in the Shade"

== 1998 Premonition Tour ==
- April 24: New Orleans Jazz and Heritage Festival, Louisiana
- April 25: University of New Orleans
- June 12: Tinley Park, Illinois, New World Music Theatre
- June 13: Deer Creek Music Center, Indianapolis, Indiana
- June 15: Milwaukee, Wisconsin, Marcus Amphitheatre
- June 16: Minneapolis, Minnesota, Northrop Auditorium
- June 18: Pine Knob Music Theater, Detroit, Michigan
- June 19: Burgettstown, Pennsylvania, Star Lake Amphitheatre
- June 21: Darien Center, New York
- June 22: Poughkeepsie, New York
- June 24: Scraton, Pennsylvania
- June 25: Wantagh, New York, Jones Beach Amphitheatre
- June 27: Holmdel, New Jersey, P.N.C. Bank Arts Center
- June 28: Wallingford, Connecticut, Oakdale Theatre
- June 30: Mansfield, Massachusetts, Great Woods Center
- July 2: New York, New York, Radio City Music Hall
- July 3: Star Pavilion, Hershey, Pennsylvania
- July 5: Saratoga Springs, New York, Performing Arts Center
- July 7: Philadelphia, Pennsylvania, Mann Music Center
- July 9: Virginia Beach, Virginia, Virginia Beach Amphitheater
- July 10: Bristow, Virginia, Nissan Pavilion
- July 19: Atlanta, Georgia, Chastain Park Amphitheatre
- July 21: Richmond, Virginia, Classic Amphitheatre
- July 22: Charlotte, North Carolina, Blockbuster Pavilion
- July 25: West Palm Beach, Florida, Coral Sky Amphitheatre
- July 29: Knoxville, Tennessee, World's Fair Park
- July 31: Antioch, Tennessee, Starwood Amphitheatre
- August 1: Little Rock, Arkansas
- August 3: Woodlands, Texas, C.W. Mitchell Pavilion
- August 4: Dallas, Texas, Starplex Amphitheatre
- August 6: Morrison, Colorado, Red Rocks Amphitheatre
- August 8: Woodinville, Washington, Chateau Ste. Michelle
- August 9: Eugene, Oregon, Cuthbert Amphitheater
- August 11: Portland, Oregon, River Queen Showplace
- August 13: Fresno, California
- August 14: San Francisco, California, Bill Graham Civic Auditorium
- August 15: San Jose, California
- August 17: Chula Vista, California, Coors Amphitheatre
- August 19: Los Angeles, California, Greek Theatre
- August 20: Los Angeles, California, Greek Theatre
- August 28: Boston, Massachusetts
- September 2: Copenhagen DEN Forum
- September 4: Malmo SWE Baltiska Hallen
- September 5: Goteborg SWE Scandinavium
- September 7: Helsinki FIN Hartwall Arena
- September 9: Norrkoping SWE Himmelstalundhallen
- September 11: Stockholm SWE Stockholm Globe Arena
- September 12: Borlange SWE Kupolen
- September 14: Oslo NOR Oslo Spektrum
- November 12: Sydney Entertainment Centre
- November 15: Brisbane Entertainment Centre
- November 18: Melbourne Park
- November 19: Sandalford Estate, Perth
- November 21: Adelaide Entertainment Centre

== Charts ==
=== Weekly charts ===
Chart (1997–2003)	Peak position
Australian Albums (ARIA)	25
Belgian Albums (Ultratop Flanders)	15
Canada Top Albums/CDs (RPM)	55
Dutch Albums (Album Top 100)	51
Finnish Albums (Suomen virallinen lista)	10
German Albums (Offizielle Top 100)	47
Norwegian Albums (VG-lista)	2
Swedish Albums (Sverigetopplistan)	1
Swiss Albums (Schweizer Hitparade)	38
UK Albums (Official Charts)	172
US Billboard 200	29

=== Year-end charts ===
Chart (1998)	Position
Australian Albums (ARIA)	89
Swedish Albums (Sverigetopplistan)	15

== Certifications ==
Region	Certification	Certified units/sales
Australia (ARIA)	Gold	35,000^{^}
Australia (ARIA) DVD	Platinum	15,000^{^}
Norway (IFPI Norway)	Gold	25,000^{*}
Sweden (GLF)	Gold	40,000^{^}
United States (RIAA)	Gold	500,000^{^}
^{*} Sales figures based on certification alone.^{^} Shipments figures based on certification alone.
