= Wrote a Song for Everyone (album) =

Studio album by John Fogerty
- Released: May 28, 2013
- Recorded: 2011–2013
- Genre: Country rock
- Length: 59:27
- Label: Vanguard
- Producers: Zac Brown; Mike E. Clark; Clay Cook; John Fogerty; Matt Mangano; Keith Stegall

John Fogerty chronology
The Blue Ridge Rangers Rides Again (2009)	Wrote a Song for Everyone (2013)	Fogerty's Factory (2020)

Wrote a Song for Everyone is the ninth solo studio album by the American guitarist and singer-songwriter John Fogerty, released on May 28, 2013 (Fogerty's 68th birthday) in the United States. The album is a collection of Creedence Clearwater Revival classics and deep tracks from his canon of hits as well as some new songs, performed alongside an array of notable musicians, including Foo Fighters ("Fortunate Son"), Bob Seger ("Who'll Stop the Rain"), Dawes ("Someday Never Comes"), Brad Paisley ("Hot Rod Heart"), Miranda Lambert ("Wrote a Song for Everyone"), Kid Rock ("Born on the Bayou"), Keith Urban ("Almost Saturday Night"), My Morning Jacket ("Long as I Can See the Light"), Alan Jackson ("Have You Ever Seen the Rain"), Jennifer Hudson ("Proud Mary"), and more. The album also features two new songs, "Mystic Highway" and "Train of Fools".

== Recording ==
Fogerty began recording the album in 2011, with a planned release on Vanguard Records.

== Promotion ==
The newly recorded version of "Born on the Bayou" featuring Kid Rock, debuted during the NFL broadcast on Super Bowl Sunday, February 3, 2013.

== Critical reception ==
Professional ratings
Aggregate scores
Source	Rating
Metacritic	71/100
Review scores
Source	Rating
AllMusic	3/5 stars
American Songwriter	3.5/5 stars
Chicago Tribune	2/4 stars
Country Weekly	A
Exclaim!	6/10
The Oakland Press	4/4 stars
Paste	8.5/10
Rolling Stone	5/5 stars
Toronto Star	3/4 stars
USA Today	3.5/4 stars

Wrote a Song for Everyone received generally positive reviews from music critics. At Metacritic, which assigns a weighted average score out of 100 using reviews and ratings from selected mainstream critics, the album's score is 71. At American Songwriter, Lynne Margolis found that "the result, is, at times, revelatory". At Country Weekly, Bob Paxman exclaimed that "this should be a must for Fogerty followers". At The Oakland Press, Gary Graff proclaimed it to be "a successful experiment, and celebration, that only adds to the legacy of Fogerty and these songs". At Paste, Holly Gleason highlighted that the release "may provide a pupu platter of genres, but the country/rock/progressive duet partners more often serve as a reminder of Fogerty’s singular potency". At Rolling Stone, David Fricke called it "a testament to the continuing truth and power in Fogerty's greatest hits". At the Toronto Star, Nick Krewen called this "fun for what it is". At USA Today, Brian Mansfield told that "the breadth of his impact shows in the guest list for Wrote a Song for Everyone".

At AllMusic, Stephen Thomas Erlewine criticized it because "no matter how much fun he's having elsewhere on the record, Fogerty doesn't need any guests to sound alive". At the Chicago Tribune, Greg Kot noted that "with songs this good, no gimmicks necessary", but this had some "mostly underwhelming results". At Exclaim!, Jason Schneider evoked that the release "illustrates Fogerty's wide-ranging influence; he may not often get credit for creating what's now known as Americana, but no one was as naturally adept at making it their signature sound".

Wrote a Song for Everyone was number 10 on Rolling Stone's 50 Best Albums of 2013 list.

== Track listing ==
All tracks are written by John Fogerty.

No.	Title	Length
1.	"Fortunate Son" (with Foo Fighters)	3:29
2.	"Almost Saturday Night" (with Keith Urban)	3:17
3.	"Lodi" (with Shane Fogerty and Tyler Fogerty)	4:19
4.	"Mystic Highway"	6:04
5.	"Wrote a Song for Everyone" (with Miranda Lambert featuring Tom Morello)	4:01
6.	"Bad Moon Rising" (with Zac Brown Band)	2:54
7.	"Long as I Can See the Light" (with My Morning Jacket)	4:49
8.	"Born on the Bayou" (with Kid Rock)	4:46
9.	"Train of Fools"	4:40
10.	"Someday Never Comes" (with Dawes)	5:16
11.	"Who'll Stop the Rain" (with Bob Seger)	3:11
12.	"Hot Rod Heart" (with Brad Paisley)	4:59
13.	"Have You Ever Seen the Rain?" (with Alan Jackson)	3:17
14.	"Proud Mary" (with Jennifer Hudson featuring Allen Toussaint and Rebirth Brass Band)	4:25

== Charts ==
=== Weekly charts ===
Chart (2013)	Peak position
Australian Albums (ARIA)	6
Austrian Albums (Ö3 Austria)	11
Belgian Albums (Ultratop Flanders)	20
Belgian Albums (Ultratop Wallonia)	51
Canadian Albums (Billboard)	3
Danish Albums (Hitlisten)	2
Dutch Albums (Album Top 100)	35
Finnish Albums (Suomen virallinen lista)	12
French Albums (SNEP)	189
German Albums (Offizielle Top 100)	24
Irish Albums (IRMA)	88
Italian Albums (FIMI)	58
New Zealand Albums (RMNZ)	10
Norwegian Albums (VG-lista)	3
Spanish Albums (Promusicae)	19
Swedish Albums (Sverigetopplistan)	10
Swiss Albums (Schweizer Hitparade)	25
UK Albums (Official Charts)	75
US Billboard 200	3
US Top Rock Albums (Billboard)	2

=== Year-end charts ===
Chart (2013)	Position
Swedish Albums (Sverigetopplistan)	70
US Billboard 200	173
US Top Rock Albums (Billboard)	47
