= Hey Tonight =

Single by Creedence Clearwater Revival

from the album Pendulum
- A-side: "Have You Ever Seen the Rain"
- Released: January 1971
- Recorded: 1970
- Genre: Swamp rock; roots rock
- Length: 2:41
- Label: Fantasy
- Songwriter: John Fogerty
- Producer: John Fogerty

Creedence Clearwater Revival singles chronology
"Lookin' Out My Back Door" (1970)	"Hey Tonight" (1971)	"Sweet Hitch-Hiker" (1971)

"Hey Tonight" is a song by American rock band Creedence Clearwater Revival from the album Pendulum. It was released as a double A-side with another song from the same album, "Have You Ever Seen the Rain". The single peaked at position #8 on the Billboard Hot 100, but did not chart in the UK. In Denmark, it was their only song leading the charts.

Cash Box said the song "features [CCR's] unique power."
