= Deja Vu All Over Again (album) =

Studio album by John Fogerty
- Released: September 21, 2004
- Recorded: Fall 2003–2004
- Genre: Roots rock; heartland rock; Americana
- Length: 34:00
- Label: DreamWorks
- Producer: John Fogerty

John Fogerty chronology
Premonition (1998)	Deja Vu All Over Again (2004)	The Long Road Home (2005)

Professional ratings
Review scores
Source	Rating
AllMusic	3/5 stars
Rolling Stone	3.5/5 stars
Music Box	4/5 stars
In Music We Trust	B−

Deja Vu All Over Again is the sixth solo studio album by the American guitarist and singer-songwriter John Fogerty. It was released in 2004, seven years after his previous studio album Blue Moon Swamp. Originally issued by DreamWorks Records, it was reissued by Geffen Records after it absorbed DreamWorks.

== Track listing and personnel ==
All music and words by John Fogerty.

1. "Deja Vu (All Over Again)" (4:13)
  - John Fogerty – guitars, vocals
  - Bob Britt – electric slide guitar
  - Benmont Tench – organ
  - Paul Bushnell – bass
  - Kenny Aronoff – drums
  - Alex Acuña – percussion
2. "Sugar-Sugar (In My Life)" (3:29)
  - John Fogerty – guitars, lead vocals, background vocals, pump organ
  - Viktor Krauss – bass
  - John O'Brian – drums/programming
3. "She's Got Baggage" (2:35)
  - John Fogerty – guitars, lead vocals, "skateboard dudes"
  - Paul Bushnell – bass
  - Kenny Aronoff – drums
  - Eric Valentine – additional parts, sound mixing
4. "Radar" (3:07)
  - John Fogerty – guitars, lead vocals, background vocals, organ, percussion
  - David Santos – bass
  - Kenny Aronoff – drums
  - George Hawkins Jr – background vocals
  - Billy Burnette – background vocals
  - Kelsy Fogerty – child voice at the end
5. "Honey Do" (2:51)
  - John Fogerty – vocals, first lead & acoustic guitars
  - Dean Parks – Rock-a-Billy guitar
  - Viktor Krauss – bass
  - Kenny Aronoff – drums
  - Aaron Plunkett – percussion
6. "Nobody's Here Anymore" (4:02)
  - John Fogerty – vocals, lead guitar (left side), other guitars
  - Mark Knopfler – second lead guitar (right side)
  - Paul Bushnell – bass
  - Kenny Aronoff – drums
7. "I Will Walk with You" (3:02)
  - John Fogerty – guitars, lead vocals, background vocals
  - Bob Applebaum, Michael DeTemple – mandolins
  - Jerry Douglas – dobro
  - Viktor Krauss – bass
8. "Rhubarb Pie" (3:17)
  - John Fogerty – vocals, other guitars
  - Dean Parks – slide guitar
  - Viktor Krauss – bass
  - Kenny Aronoff – drums
  - Aaron Plunkett – spoons
9. "Wicked Old Witch" (3:26)
  - John Fogerty – vocals, guitars, banjo, percussion, "spooky" keyboard
  - David Santos – bass
  - Kenny Aronoff – drums
10. "In the Garden" (3:50)
  - John Fogerty – guitars, lead vocals, background vocals
  - Paul Bushnell – bass
  - Kenny Aronoff – drums

== Production ==
- All songs arranged, written, and produced by John Fogerty
- All tracks mixed by Bob Clearmountain, except "She's Got Baggage", mixed by Eric Valentine
- Mastered by Bob Ludwig at Gateway Mastering & DVD, Portland, Maine
- Recorded at NRG Recording (North Hollywood, CA), Glenwood Place Studios & O'Henry Recording Studios (both in Burbank, California)
- All songs published by Cody River Music (ASCAP)
- Cover photo by Bob Fogerty
- Back cover by Julie Fogerty
- Management team Bob Fogerty and Jeff Kramer for OK Management Co.

== Charts ==
=== Weekly charts ===
Weekly chart performance
Chart (2004)	Peak position
Belgian Albums (Ultratop Flanders)	38
Belgian Albums (Ultratop Wallonia)	98
Danish Albums (Hitlisten)	19
Dutch Albums (Album Top 100)	54
Finnish Albums (Suomen virallinen lista)	9
French Albums (SNEP)	150
German Albums (Offizielle Top 100)	61
Italian Albums (FIMI)	61
Norwegian Albums (VG-lista)	4
Swedish Albums (Sverigetopplistan)	1
Swiss Albums (Schweizer Hitparade)	56
US Billboard 200	23

=== Year-end charts ===
Year-end chart performance
Chart (2004)	Position
Swedish Albums (Sverigetopplistan)	51

== Certifications ==
Certifications
Region	Certification	Certified units/sales
Norway (IFPI Norway)	Gold	20,000^{*}
Sweden (GLF)	Gold	30,000^{^}
^{*} Sales figures based on certification alone.^{^} Shipments figures based on certification alone.
