= Ramble Tamble =

Song by Creedence Clearwater Revival

from the album Cosmo's Factory
- Released: July 16, 1970
- Genre: Southern rock; psychedelic rock; space rock; rockabilly
- Length: 7:09
- Label: Fantasy
- Songwriter(s): John Fogerty
- Producer(s): John Fogerty

"Ramble Tamble" is a song written by John Fogerty and recorded by Creedence Clearwater Revival. It was released as the opening track on the band's fifth studio album, Cosmo's Factory, in 1970. It is known for its lengthy instrumental section and tempo changes.

== Background ==
A Southern rock song, "Ramble Tamble" begins and ends with rockabilly elements, and contains a psychedelic rock breakdown lasting four minutes. In 1970, John Fogerty said that "Ramble Tamble" developed from "a lot of things," including elements of the original version of "Commotion" from Green River.

John Fogerty explained the song's genesis in his autobiography, Fortunate Son: My Life, My Music:

"Ramble Tamble" just came to me one night when I was lying in bed. The melody, the guitar, the whole vibe of it, from stem to stern. I had no idea what it was about, but I could hear the sound of the guitar and the way the record would sound. That was a true gift—"Here, my son. You might need this. Pay attention." Every once in a rare while, it works that way.

== Reception ==
"Ramble Tamble" has been singled out for critical praise, with music journalist Steven Hyden calling it "the most rockin' song of all time." AllMusic critic Stephen Thomas Erlewine described it as a "claustrophobic, paranoid rocker" whose lengthy instrumental section "was dramatic and had a direction," unlike that of the band's rendition of "I Heard It Through the Grapevine". Brett Milano of udiscovermusic.com rated Fogerty's guitar solo as one of the 100 all-time greatest, stating that Fogerty "poured on the tension and the distortion, delivering a monster sound from the deep swamps." On the other hand, Rolling Stone critic John Grissim considered "Ramble Tamble" to be the only "unsatisfying" song on Cosmo's Factory.
