= Long As I Can See the Light =

1970 song by Creedence Clearwater Revival

Single by Creedence Clearwater Revival

from the album Cosmo's Factory
- A-side: "Lookin' Out My Back Door"
- Released: July 25, 1970
- Genre: Rock; gospel; New Orleans soul
- Length: 3:33
- Label: Fantasy
- Songwriter: John Fogerty
- Producer: John Fogerty

Creedence Clearwater Revival singles chronology
"Up Around the Bend" (1970)	"Long As I Can See the Light" (1970)	"Have You Ever Seen the Rain?" (1971)

"Long As I Can See the Light" is a song by American rock band Creedence Clearwater Revival, from the album Cosmo's Factory. Released as the flip side of the single "Lookin' Out My Back Door" in 1970, it reached number 57 on the Cash Box singles chart in the US, number 20 in the UK (in the UK, "Long As I Can See the Light" was on the A-side, and "Lookin' Out My Back Door" on the flip), and number one in Norway.

Cash Box compared it to "Lookin' Out My Back Door", calling "Long as I Can See the Light" "a slower paced ballad from the blues school. More subtle, but a good bet to overtake the “Lookin’” side." Billboard called it a "funky blues number."

The two songs were also released as a double-sided single and peaked at number two in the US.

"Long As I Can See the Light" appears on most Creedence Clearwater Revival compilation albums, notably The Best of Creedence Clearwater Revival and Chronicle: The 20 Greatest Hits. It became a concert staple for singer John Fogerty as a solo artist.

Fogerty biographer Thomas M. Kitts describes the song as depicting a "world-weary figure", perhaps Jeremiah, who "undertakes an uncertain journey." The singer is confident as long as he "can see the light." Kitts points out that the word 'light' has two meanings in the song: a spiritual meaning, such as in "The Lord is my light" from Psalm 27, and "the secular light of love". He describes the music as having a "hymnal, church-like feel."

Fogerty expressed surprise at having come up with a candle as a metaphor for a beacon guiding the singer home. He stated that the song is "about the loner in me. Wanting to feel understood, needing those at home to shine a light so that I can make my way back."

"If you tour a lot, it's one of those songs that just makes you miss home so badly," remarked Slipknot front-man Corey Taylor. "A really sombre piece."

The drum beat was sampled by Moby for "The Sky Is Broken" on his 1999 album Play.

== 2013 remake ==
Fogerty recorded a new version of the song, with the rock band My Morning Jacket, for his 2013 album Wrote a Song for Everyone. The remake was recorded at Blackbird Studio in Nashville on May 2, 2012.

== Certifications ==
Certifications for "Long As I Can See the Light"
Region	Certification	Certified units/sales
New Zealand (RMNZ)	Gold	15,000^{‡}
^{‡} Sales+streaming figures based on certification alone.
