= Who'll Stop the Rain (song) =

- Australian release picture sleeve

Single by Creedence Clearwater Revival

from the album Cosmo's Factory
- A-side: "Travelin' Band"
- Released: January 1970
- Genre: Folk rock; roots rock
- Length: 2:29
- Label: Fantasy
- Songwriter: John Fogerty
- Producer: John Fogerty

Creedence Clearwater Revival singles chronology
"Down on the Corner" (1969)	"Who'll Stop the Rain" (1970)	"Up Around the Bend" (1970)

"Who'll Stop the Rain" is a song written by John Fogerty and originally recorded by Creedence Clearwater Revival (CCR) for their 1970 album Cosmo's Factory. Backed with "Travelin' Band", it was one of three double-sided singles from that album to reach the top five on the Billboard Pop Singles chart and the first of two to reach the No. 2 spots on the American charts, alongside "Lookin' Out My Back Door"/"Long As I Can See the Light". In 2004, Rolling Stone ranked it No. 188 on its "500 Greatest Songs of All Time" list.

== History ==
Lyrically, "Who'll Stop the Rain" breaks into three verses, with a historical recent past, and present tense approach. All three verses allude to a sense of unending malaise, pondered by "good men through the ages", "Five Year Plans and New Deals/wrapped in golden chains", and the Woodstock generation.

Musically, in contrast to the 1950s-Rock-inspired "Traveling' Band", "Who'll Stop the Rain" has more of an acoustic, folk-rock feel to it. Like many folk-rock songs, it starts off with a ringing acoustic guitar riff, though the backing throughout has more of a roots rock sound than that heard on more standard folk-rock recordings. Interpreting the song in its time period (1970), and the resigned but somewhat angry feeling of the song, many see "Who'll Stop the Rain" as a thinly-veiled protest against the Vietnam War, with the final verse lyrics and its references to music, large crowds, rain, and crowds trying to keep warm being about the band's experience at the Woodstock Festival in August 1969. For his part, when asked by Rolling Stone about the meaning of the song's lyrics, John Fogerty was quoted as saying,

Certainly, I was talking about Washington, when I wrote the song, but I remember bringing the master version of the song home and playing it. My son Josh was four years old at the time, and after he heard it, he said, 'Daddy stop the rain.' And my wife and I looked at each other and said, 'Well, not quite.'

In 2007 during a concert in Shelburne, Vermont, he said the following about the song:

Well, this next song has a bit of a fable surrounding it. A lot of folks seem to think I sang this song at Woodstock way back then. No, I was at Woodstock 1969. I think. It was a nice event. I'm a California kid. I went up there and saw a whole bunch of really nice young people Hairy, Colorful. It started to rain, and got really muddy, and then half a million people took their clothes off! Boomer generation making its presence known, I guess. Anyway, then I went home and wrote this song.

== Reception ==
The song was acclaimed by critics. Billboard called it a "blockbuster side" that "has the beat and feel of [Creedence's] hits." Cash Box said that it spotlights Creedence's "originated river-rock style." Record World called the single a "two-sided smash."

Ultimate Classic Rock critic Bryan Wawzenek rated the lyrics of "Who'll Stop the Rain" as Fogerty's second-greatest, saying "It appears that he feels the efforts to solve widespread maladies are futile, whether it’s the intelligentsia, politicians or the Woodstock generation who are doing the fixing. It’s Fogerty’s most cleverly written allegory."

== Other versions ==
Bruce Springsteen occasionally performs the song. The song was a concert staple during his 1980-81 River Tour, as well as on the summer 2003 leg of the Rising Tour. Springsteen and the E Street Band opened with "Who'll Stop the Rain" whenever it was raining.

When Creedence Clearwater Revival was inducted into the Rock and Roll Hall of Fame in 1993, Springsteen performed the song with John Fogerty.

The song has also been covered by Rudy Rotta, Rod Stewart, Rise Against, Courtney Jaye, The Ventures, The Stonemans, and Vince Neil and was included on John Fogerty's 1998 live CD/DVD Premonition. The Stereophonics have also covered the song as a B-side to their single "Local Boy in the Photograph".

Microdisney performed the song live, frequently in 1984 and on at least one occasion in 1985. Their version of the song was rearranged in their style, at a faster tempo with additional instrumental parts. Usually the song had guitarist Sean O'Hagan performing vocals on it, but regular singer Cathal Coughlan sang on the 1985 version.

Engelbert Humperdinck included "Who'll Stop the Rain" on his 2009 album A Taste of Country.

For Fogerty's 2013 album, Wrote a Song for Everyone, featuring duets of classic CCR songs, he re-recorded a duet with Bob Seger.

Garth Brooks recorded the song for the 2013 The Melting Pot album in the "Blame It All on My Roots: Five Decades of Influences" compilation.

Dwight Yoakam released a version of the song as a single in 2014, after his character, Lyle Chumley, sang a fragment of the song in the "Force Majeure" episode of Under the Dome.

Bill Haley and the Comets recorded a version of this song on their album "Rock Around the Country".

It was also recorded by Ronnie Hawkins and The Hawks in 1986. In '86 they would have been called The Band but they paired up with Hawkins again for one album.

== Use in media ==
=== Film ===
In 1978, the song was used in the film Who'll Stop the Rain. The movie starred Nick Nolte as a Vietnam veteran. It was originally going to be called Dog Soldiers after the source novel, but when the producers got the rights to use the song, they changed the title to it. The song also appeared in the 1989 film Powwow Highway. Both the original song and a softer, slower cover version sung by Courtney Jaye are included in the soundtrack of December Boys. A clip of the song appears in the film The War. The song was also included in the movie Philadelphia. In 1990 it was also used in a third-season episode of Tour Of Duty, a TV action-drama series that followed the fortunes of a U.S. Army platoon during the Vietnam War. The song features in Haruki Murakami's novel "Hear the Wind Sing" which was later made into a film. In 2014, the song’s first verse and chorus were sung (a cappella) by guest star (and country music singer/songwriter) Dwight Yoakam in episode 3 in season 2 of the CBS tv series, “Under the Dome”. The song also is featured in the 2023 Netflix film We Have a Ghost.

=== Commercials ===
Creedence Clearwater Revival songs appeared in many films and commercials, in part because John Fogerty signed away legal control of his old recordings to Creedence's record label, Fantasy Records. Fogerty objected to what he regarded as a misuse of his music in an NPR interview:

Folks will remember Forrest Gump and that was a great movie, but they don't remember all the really poor movies that Fantasy Records stuck Creedence music into: car commercials, tire commercials. I'm remembering a paint thinner ad at one point (actually, it was Thompson's Water Seal), the song "Who'll Stop the Rain". Oh, boy. That's clever, isn't it?

== Weekly charts ==
Chart (1970)	Peak position
Belgium (Ultratop 50 Flanders)	1
Belgium (Ultratip Bubbling Under Wallonia)	3
Netherlands (Dutch Top 40)	1
US Billboard Hot 100	2

== Certifications ==
Region	Certification	Certified units/sales
New Zealand (RMNZ)	Platinum	30,000^{‡}
United States (RIAA)	Platinum	1,000,000^{^}
^{^} Shipments figures based on certification alone.^{‡} Sales+streaming figures based on certification alone.
