= Someday Never Comes =

1972 single by Creedence Clearwater Revival

- German release picture sleeve

Single by Creedence Clearwater Revival

from the album Mardi Gras
- B-side: "Tearin' Up the Country"
- Released: May 1972
- Recorded: January 1972
- Genre: Country rock
- Length: 4:01
- Label: Fantasy
- Songwriter: John Fogerty
- Producers: Stu Cook; Doug Clifford; John Fogerty

Creedence Clearwater Revival singles chronology
"Sweet Hitch-Hiker" (1971)	"Someday Never Comes" (1972)

"Someday Never Comes" is a song by Creedence Clearwater Revival from their album Mardi Gras, released in May 1972 and written by the band's frontman, John Fogerty. It was the final single released by Creedence Clearwater Revival before their official breakup in October of that year.

== Background ==
In 2013, Fogerty said the song reflected both his parents' divorce and his own, explaining:

When I wrote this song, my life was pretty chaotic. I knew my marriage was going to break up. My band was falling apart. I was beginning to sense the darkness that was Fantasy Records. This song was inspired by my parents' divorce when I was a young boy and the effect it had on me. At the time, they told me, "Someday, you'll understand." The truth is that you never do, and I found myself facing this as a parent. The irony was painful and inescapable.

Fogerty wrote that the song's arrangement was robbed of the power and complexity he envisioned due to the turmoil in the band, which included the departure of rhythm guitarist Tom Fogerty. Fogerty considered the version on his 2013 album Wrote a Song for Everyone to be closer to his original vision.

== Reception ==
The single reached No. 25 on the U.S. Billboard Hot 100 chart in June 1972, with Doug Clifford's "Tearin' Up the Country" as the B-side. Record World called it "perhaps the strongest cut" on the Mardi Gras with "outstanding lyrics [and] vocals."

Creedence Clearwater Revival bassist Stu Cook considered "Someday Never Comes" to be Fogerty's finest song, saying it "brought tears to my eyes." Drummer Doug Clifford called it Fogerty's most personal song and felt it did not make the impact it should have as a result of being on the unheralded Mardi Gras.

Robert Christgau of The Village Voice wrote that while "Someday Never Comes" may be a "major" song, he felt that Fogerty's vocal was uninspired. Greil Marcus of Creem lauded the song: "I found myself in the midst of a song so overwhelming, so true and so unflinching I started to cry and would have called John Fogerty to thank him if his number was listed. I played it again and again and finally quit when I realized the song was stronger than I was."
