= Cosmo's Factory =

1970 studio album by Creedence Clearwater Revival

Studio album by Creedence Clearwater Revival
- Released: July 8, 1970
- Recorded: 1969–1970
- Studio: Wally Heider (San Francisco)
- Genres: Rock; swamp rock
- Length: 42:28
- Label: Fantasy
- Producer: John Fogerty

Creedence Clearwater Revival chronology
Willy and the Poor Boys (1969)	Cosmo's Factory (1970)	Pendulum (1970)

Singles from Cosmo's Factory
- 1. "Travelin' Band" / "Who'll Stop the Rain" Released: January 1970; 2. "Up Around the Bend" / "Run Through the Jungle" Released: April 1970; 3. "Lookin' Out My Back Door" / "Long As I Can See the Light" Released: July 1970

Cosmo's Factory is the fifth studio album by the American rock band Creedence Clearwater Revival, released by Fantasy Records on July 8, 1970. Six of the album's eleven tracks were released as singles in 1970, and all of them charted in the top 5 of the Billboard Hot 100. The album spent nine consecutive weeks in the number one position on the Billboard 200 chart and was certified 4× platinum by the Recording Industry Association of America (RIAA) in 1990. Rolling Stone ranked it number 413 on its 2020 list of the "500 Greatest Albums of All Time".

== Songs ==
Cosmo's Factory displays the wide range of musical ingredients that provided the foundation for their "swamp rock" sound: R&B ("Before You Accuse Me", "My Baby Left Me"), soul ("I Heard It Through the Grapevine", "Long As I Can See the Light"), country ("Lookin' Out My Back Door"), rockabilly and classic rock and roll ("Ooby Dooby", "Travelin' Band"), and psychedelia ("Ramble Tamble").

"Travelin' Band" was inspired by 1950s rock 'n' roll songs, particularly those by Little Richard. In October 1972, the company that held the publishing rights to Richard's "Good Golly, Miss Molly" felt "Travelin' Band" bore enough similarities to warrant a plagiarism lawsuit that was later settled out of court. The song's flip side, "Who'll Stop the Rain", could not have been more different, with Fogerty telling Uncut in 2012: "'Travelin' Band' was my salute to Little Richard, but 'Who'll Stop The Rain?' was part of the fabric of the times. From '68 to '74, Vietnam was probably the most important thing on the minds of young people." "Run Through the Jungle" mined similar territory, with many listeners believing the lyrics to be about the war (although the song was actually about the prevalence of guns in the United States). According to the band's bassist Stu Cook, the song's opening and closing both feature jungle sound effects created by "lots of backwards recorded guitar and piano." The song was rhythm guitarist Tom Fogerty's favorite CCR song: "My all-time favorite Creedence tune was 'Run Through the Jungle'. It's like a little movie in itself with all the sound effects. It never changes key, but it holds your interest the whole time. It's like a musician's dream. It never changes key, yet you get the illusion it does."

"Lookin' Out My Back Door" was a direct tribute to the Bakersfield Sound, a style of music that influenced John Fogerty and the Creedence sound – Buck Owens, one of the architects of the Bakersfield Sound, is even mentioned in the lyrics. The song is known for its upbeat tempo, its down-home feel, and a change in key and tempo towards the end. The lyrics, filled with colorful, dream-like imagery, led some to believe the song was about drugs (according to the drug theory, the "flying spoon" in the song was a cocaine spoon, and the crazy animal images were an acid trip). Fogerty, however, has repeatedly stated in interviews that the song was actually written for his son Josh, who was three years old at the time, and said the reference to a parade passing by was inspired by the Dr. Seuss book And to Think That I Saw It on Mulberry Street.

Although CCR was well-known for its concise, tightly arranged songs, Cosmo's Factory features two longer cuts: the seven-minute opener, "Ramble Tamble", and an 11-minute cover of Marvin Gaye's "I Heard It Through the Grapevine".

Several songs on the album pay tribute to the band's blues and rock and roll roots, including Big Arthur Crudup's "My Baby Left Me" (a notable cover of which had previously been recorded by Elvis Presley), Bo Diddley's "Before You Accuse Me", and the rockabilly classic "Ooby Dooby".

== Album title and artwork ==
The name of the album comes from the warehouse in Berkeley where the band rehearsed early in their career, which was dubbed "The Factory" by drummer Doug "Cosmo" Clifford, because bandleader John Fogerty made them practice there almost every day. In 2013, Clifford recalled to Goldmine that "John knew the press would be all over us for the album, so he said that he would name the album after me and that I would have to deal with it. He wanted the pressure off of him. It was our biggest album ever and I tell people that they named it after me, so it had to be a hit [laughter]. That's a joke!"

The cover photo was taken by Bob Fogerty, brother of John and Tom. As David Cavanagh of Uncut wrote in 2012: "The album's front cover showed the four of them caught by a camera in an off-duty moment, a proudly uncool quartet who looked more like lumberjacks than rock stars." The handwritten sign affixed to the support post at the left of the photo that reads "3RD GENERATION" is an ironic reference to something rock music critic Ralph Gleason wrote in the liner notes of the band's debut album: "Creedence Clearwater Revival is an excellent example of the Third Generation of San Francisco bands".

== Critical reception ==
Professional ratings
Review scores
Source	Rating
AllMusic	5/5 stars
Christgau's Record Guide	A
Encyclopedia of Popular Music	4/5 stars
Pitchfork	8.8/10
Rolling Stone	5/5 stars

In its original review, Rolling Stone wrote: "It should be obvious by now that Creedence Clearwater Revival is one great rock and roll band. Cosmo's Factory, the group's fifth album, is another good reason why."

AllMusic rates the album 5 out of 5 stars: "On 'Long as I Can See the Light', the record's final song, he again finds solace in home, anchored by a soulful, laid-back groove. It hits a comforting, elegiac note, the perfect way to draw Cosmo's Factory – an album made during stress and chaos, filled with raging rockers, covers, and intense jams – to a close."

=== Accolades ===
In 2014, Cosmo's Factory was inducted into the Grammy Hall of Fame.

In 2003, the album was ranked number 265 on Rolling Stone's list of the 500 greatest albums of all time; it was re-ranked number 413 on the revised 2020 list.

== Commercial performance ==
In January 1970, the double A-sided "Travelin' Band"/"Who'll Stop the Rain" single peaked at number two on the Billboard Hot 100 chart. In April, the band released the double A-sided "Up Around the Bend"/"Run Through the Jungle" single, which reached number four on the Hot 100, and started their first tour of Europe. Cosmo's Factory was released in July 1970, as was the band's ninth single, "Lookin' Out My Back Door"/"Long as I Can See the Light", which reached number two on the Hot 100.

Cosmo's Factory was CCR's fifth album in two years to became an international success, topping the album charts in six countries.

The album was certified gold (500,000 units sold) by the Recording Industry Association of America on December 16, 1970. Almost 20 years later, on December 13, 1990, it received a certification of four times platinum, indicating sales of over four million copies.

== Track listing ==
All tracks are written by John Fogerty, except where noted.

Side one
No.	Title	Writer(s)	Length
1.	"Ramble Tamble"		7:09
2.	"Before You Accuse Me"	Ellas McDaniel	3:24
3.	"Travelin' Band"		2:07
4.	"Ooby Dooby"	Wade Moore, Dick Penner	2:05
5.	"Lookin' out My Back Door"		2:31
6.	"Run Through the Jungle"		3:09

Side two
No.	Title	Writer(s)	Length
1.	"Up Around the Bend"		2:40
2.	"My Baby Left Me"	Arthur Crudup	2:17
3.	"Who'll Stop the Rain"		2:28
4.	"I Heard It Through the Grapevine"	Norman Whitfield, Barrett Strong	11:05
5.	"Long as I Can See the Light"		3:33

40th Anniversary Edition CD bonus tracks
No.	Title	Length
12.	"Travelin' Band" (Remake take)	2:15
13.	"Up Around the Bend" (Live in Amsterdam, September 10, 1971)	2:41
14.	"Born on the Bayou" (with Booker T. & the M.G.'s at Fantasy Studios, 1970)	5:58

== Personnel ==
Creedence Clearwater Revival

- John Fogerty – lead guitar, lead vocals, piano, electric piano, keyboards, saxophone, harmonica, producer, arranger (1968 Gibson Les Paul Customs, 1969 Rickenbacker 325)
- Tom Fogerty – rhythm guitar, backing vocals (1969 Guild Starfire VI)
- Stu Cook – bass guitar, backing vocals
- Doug Clifford – drums, cowbell

Production

- Russ Gary – engineer
- Bob Fogerty – cover art, design, photography

== Charts ==
=== Weekly charts ===
Weekly chart performance for Cosmo's Factory
Chart (1970–1971)	Peak position
Australian Albums (Kent Music Report)	1
Canada Top Albums/CDs (RPM)	1
Dutch Albums (Album Top 100)	2
German Albums (Offizielle Top 100)	4
Finnish Albums (The Official Finnish Charts)	1
Italian Albums (Musica e Dischi)	2
Japanese Albums (Oricon)	10
Norwegian Albums (VG-lista)	1
UK Albums (Official Charts)	1
US Billboard 200	1
US Top R&B/Hip-Hop Albums (Billboard)	11

Chart (2026)	Peak position
Greek Albums (IFPI)	43

=== Year-end charts ===
Year-end chart performance for Cosmo's Factory
Chart (1971)	Position
Dutch Albums (Album Top 100)	57
German Albums (Offizielle Top 100)	41

== Certifications ==
Certifications for Cosmo's Factory
Region	Certification	Certified units/sales
Australia (ARIA)	Platinum	70,000^{‡}
Finland (Musiikkituottajat)	Gold	20,000
Italy (FIMI)	Gold	25,000^{‡}
United Kingdom (BPI)	Gold	100,000^{‡}
United States (RIAA)	4× Platinum	4,000,000^{^}
^{^} Shipments figures based on certification alone.^{‡} Sales+streaming figures based on certification alone.

== Release history ==
Release history and formats for Cosmo's Factory
Region	Date	Label	Format	Catalog
North America	July 1970	Fantasy	Stereo LP	8402
North America	July 1970	Fantasy	Cassette	58402
North America	July 1970	Fantasy	8-track	88402
North America	July 1970	Fantasy	Reel to Reel	M 8402
United Kingdom	1970	Liberty	Stereo LP	LBS 83388
Germany	1970	Bellaphon	stereo LP	BLPS 19005
Various	March 1973	Fantasy	stereo LP	FT 502
United States	1980	Mobile Fidelity Sound Lab	Half-speed LP	MFSL 1-037
United States	1983	Fantasy	Stereo LP	ORC-4516
United States	August 1987	Fantasy	CD	CDFE 505
Various	2008	Fantasy	Expanded CD	FAN-30880-02
