= Travelin' Band =

Original song written and composed by John Fogerty

Single by Creedence Clearwater Revival

from the album Cosmo's Factory
- A-side: "Who'll Stop the Rain"
- Released: January 1970
- Genre: Rock and roll
- Length: 2:08
- Label: Fantasy
- Songwriter: John Fogerty
- Producer: John Fogerty

Creedence Clearwater Revival singles chronology
"Fortunate Son" (1969)	"Travelin' Band" (1970)	"Up Around the Bend" (1970)

"Travelin' Band" is a song written by John Fogerty and originally recorded by Creedence Clearwater Revival. It was included on their 1970 album Cosmo's Factory. Backed with "Who'll Stop the Rain", it was one of three double sided singles from that album to reach the top five on the U.S. Pop Singles Chart and the first of two to reach the number 2 spot on the American charts, alongside "Lookin' Out My Back Door". "Travelin' Band" was also a hit in the UK, reaching number 8 on the UK Singles Chart.

== Background ==
The song was inspired, both musically and for Fogerty's vocal delivery, by 1950s rock 'n' roll songs, particularly those of Little Richard. Musically, it has also been described as nearly identical to The Monkees' 1967 song, "No Time". In October 1972, the company that held the publishing rights to Richard's "Good Golly, Miss Molly" felt that "Travelin' Band" bore enough similarities to warrant a plagiarism lawsuit that was later settled out of court. The lyrics of the song describe what life is like for a musician on the road. The opening line "Seven-thirty-seven coming out of the sky" refers to the Boeing 737, then coming into service on short-to-medium range routes.

== Reception ==
Billboard called it a "blockbuster side" and a "wild blues shouter." Cash Box said that it "features the team’s drive focused on an updating of the 'Long Tall Sally' rock sound." Record World called the single a "two-sided smash."

== Charts ==
Chart performance for "Travelin' Band"
Chart (1970)	Peak position
Austria (Ö3 Austria Top 40)	8
Belgium (Ultratop 50 Flanders)	1
Belgium (Ultratop 50 Wallonia)	3
Canada Top Singles (RPM)	4
Germany (GfK)	4
Ireland (IRMA)	8
Netherlands (Dutch Top 40)	1
New Zealand (Listener)	4
Norway (VG-lista)	4
Switzerland (Schweizer Hitparade)	4
UK Singles (Official Charts)	8
US Billboard Hot 100	2

== Certifications ==
Certifications for "Travelin' Band"
Region	Certification	Certified units/sales
United States (RIAA)	Gold	500,000^{‡}
^{‡} Sales+streaming figures based on certification alone.
