= Sweet Hitch-Hiker =

Single by Creedence Clearwater Revival

from the album Mardi Gras
- B-side: "Door to Door"
- Released: July 1971
- Genre: Swamp rock; rock and roll; boogie rock
- Length: 2:57
- Label: Fantasy
- Songwriter: John Fogerty
- Producers: Stu Cook; Doug Clifford; John Fogerty

Creedence Clearwater Revival singles chronology
"Have You Ever Seen the Rain?" (1971)	"Sweet Hitch-Hiker" (1971)	"Someday Never Comes" (1972)

"Sweet Hitch-Hiker" is a song by American rock band Creedence Clearwater Revival. It was first released as a single in July 1971 and reached No. 6 on the Billboard Hot 100, becoming their 9th and final top 10 hit. It was later included on the 1972 album Mardi Gras.

== Background ==
"Sweet Hitch-Hiker" was written by CCR frontman John Fogerty and tells the story of a freewheeling motorcyclist who crashes after being distracted by an attractive blonde hitch-hiker. Biographer Hank Bordowitz speculates the song might have reflected on Fogerty's newfound freedom after separating from his wife. The line "We could make music at the Greasy King" references a hamburger stand in the band's hometown of El Cerrito, California. It was the band's first single recorded without rhythm guitarist Tom Fogerty, who had left the group in early 1971 after the completion of their album Pendulum.

After the expiration of Fogerty's previous unfavorable publishing deal with Fantasy Records, "Sweet Hitch-Hiker" was the first of only two CCR singles whose publishing he owned, a fact he reflected upon bitterly in his autobiography. The single's B-side, bassist Stu Cook's "Door to Door," was the product of the band's democratic decision-making after the departure of Tom Fogerty, where all members would write and sing their own material. Fogerty wrote that the "results were, to put it mildly, underwhelming."

== Reception ==
The single peaked at No. 6 on the Billboard Hot 100 and No. 36 on the Record Retailer UK Singles Chart.

Bordowitz called "Sweet Hitch-Hiker" a "classic John Fogerty stomper," while Michael Oldfield, reviewing Mardi Gras for Melody Maker, called it "the only cut [on the album] which sounds like Creedence."

== Chart performance ==
=== Weekly charts ===
Chart (1971)	Peak position
Australia (Go-Set)	9
Belgium (Ultratop 50 Flanders)	8
Belgium (Ultratop 50 Wallonia)	18
Netherlands (Single Top 100)	5
Canada (RPM 100 Singles)	1
Germany (GfK)	6
New Zealand (Listener)	15
Norway (VG-lista)	4
South Africa (Springbok)	8
Switzerland (Schweizer Hitparade)	1
US Billboard Hot 100	6
US (Cash Box Top 100)	5
UK Singles (Official Charts)	36

=== Year-end charts ===
Chart (1971)	Rank
Australia	80
Canada	22
US Billboard	101
US Cash Box	76

== Certifications ==
Country	Certification
United States	Gold
