= Mardi Gras (album) =

Studio album by Creedence Clearwater Revival
- Released: April 11, 1972
- Recorded: May 1971, January 1972
- Studios: Wally Heider (San Francisco); Fantasy Records Studio A in Berkeley, California
- Genre: Country rock
- Length: 28:20
- Label: Fantasy
- Producer: Creedence

Creedence Clearwater Revival chronology
Pendulum (1970)	Mardi Gras (1972)	Creedence Gold (1972)

Singles from Mardi Gras
- 1. "Sweet Hitch-Hiker"/"Door to Door" Released: July 1971; 2. "Someday Never Comes"/"Tearin' Up the Country"" Released: May 1972

Mardi Gras is the seventh and final studio album by the American rock band Creedence Clearwater Revival, released on April 11, 1972, by Fantasy Records. Recorded after the departure of guitarist Tom Fogerty, it was the band's only studio album as a trio. Unlike previous albums, Stu Cook and Doug Clifford also shared songwriting and production duties with John Fogerty on this project. They also provided their own lead vocal contributions for the first time. However, the recording sessions were marred by personal and creative tensions, and the group disbanded after a short U.S. tour to support the album.

== Production ==
Except for "Sweet Hitch-Hiker" and "Door to Door," which were recorded in May of 1971, Mardi Gras was recorded in January 1972. John's older brother, Tom Fogerty, had departed the group at the end of 1970 following a dispute that was, in large part, caused by his desire to play a larger creative role, and John's insistence on being the band's only singer, songwriter, arranger and business manager, roles he had assumed from the inception of CCR.

John Fogerty only contributed three original songs to Mardi Gras and also sang lead on a fourth, a cover of the Ricky Nelson hit "Hello Mary Lou." According to Cook and Clifford, it was Fogerty's idea for all of the remaining members to contribute an equal number of new songs, despite their reservations. They believed he was bitter over his brother's departure and their own demands to have a larger say in the group's musical decisions, and because of this, he was looking for an excuse to break up CCR to pursue a solo career. When Clifford and Cook at first demurred at the idea of having to supply two-thirds of the album's material, they claimed Fogerty threatened to quit the band, and that, when they agreed, he refused to contribute any vocals or instrumentation to their songs, except for guitar.

The album was nonetheless a commercial success, though markedly less than previous releases, peaking at number 12 on the Billboard Hot 100 and going gold. It contained two Top 40 singles, "Sweet Hitch-Hiker" and "Someday Never Comes," both of which were written and sung by Fogerty. But mounting personal, financial and legal woes compounded the fragile situation within the band, and on October 16, 1972, the group and its record label, Fantasy Records, released a statement announcing the official disbanding of Creedence, five months after the Mardi Gras tour ended.

In 1976, John Fogerty told Rolling Stone: "I figured that Creedence made six albums. Let me count... the first one, Bayou Country, Green River, Willy and the Poor Boys, Cosmo's Factory, Pendulum... yeah, six. I wouldn’t even count Mardi Gras and neither would anybody else. I had no control over anything after that. The rest is horse manure. Baloney."

== Reception ==
Professional ratings
Review scores
Source	Rating
AllMusic	1.5/5 stars
Christgau's Record Guide	B
Creem	A−
Encyclopedia of Popular Music	2/5 stars

Reviews for the album were mixed to poor, with Jon Landau writing in his May 25, 1972, review for Rolling Stone that it was, "relative to a group's established level of performance, the worst album I have ever heard from a major rock band." He also added: "In the future, Mardi Gras may be known as Fogerty's Revenge." In a rare positive review, Gene Sculatti of Phonograph Record praised John Fogerty's performance on the record, but noted the absence of Tom Fogerty as a downside. He concluded: "It may not be Green River or Cosmo's Factory, but Mardi Gras offers some of Creedence's finest moments, and it's a damn good answer to any and all of those 'Rock is Dying' clowns."

Mardi Gras was not remastered and reissued on CD until 2000. A remastered version of the album was featured on the 40th anniversary CCR box set, but not as a stand-alone album. It was remastered and released on 180 gram vinyl by Analogue Productions in 2006. The album was re-released in remastered format as a Japan exclusive in January 2011.

== Track listing ==
Side one
No.	Title	Writer(s)	Lead singer	Length
1.	"Lookin' for a Reason"	John Fogerty	Fogerty	3:28
2.	"Take It Like a Friend"	Stu Cook	Cook	3:00
3.	"Need Someone to Hold"	Cook; Doug Clifford	Clifford	3:01
4.	"Tearin' Up the Country"	Clifford	Clifford	2:15
5.	"Someday Never Comes"	Fogerty	Fogerty	4:01

Side two
No.	Title	Writer(s)	Lead singer	Length
1.	"What Are You Gonna Do"	Clifford	Clifford	2:42
2.	"Sail Away"	Cook	Cook	2:28
3.	"Hello Mary Lou"	Gene Pitney; Cayet Mangiaracina	Fogerty	2:14
4.	"Door to Door"	Cook	Cook	2:09
5.	"Sweet Hitch-Hiker"	Fogerty	Fogerty	2:59

== Personnel ==
Creedence Clearwater Revival

- John Fogerty – vocals, lead and rhythm guitars, keyboards, harmonica
- Stu Cook – vocals, bass, keyboards, lead and rhythm guitars on "Sail Away"
- Doug Clifford – vocals, drums

Production

- Creedence – arrangements and production
- Russ Gary – engineering
- Tony Lane – art direction, cover design
- Bob Fogerty – photography
- Baron Wolman – photography
- George Horn – remastering
- Craig Werner – liner notes on CD version

== Charts ==
=== Weekly charts ===
Weekly chart performance for Mardi Gras
Chart (1972)	Peak position
Australian Albums (Kent Music Report)	8
Canada Top Albums/CDs (RPM)	11
Dutch Albums (Album Top 100)	2
German Albums (Offizielle Top 100)	10
Finnish Albums (The Official Finnish Charts)	2
Italian Albums (Musica e Dischi)	4
Japanese Albums (Oricon)	3
Norwegian Albums (VG-lista)	5
US Billboard 200	12

=== Year-end charts ===
Year-end chart performance for Mardi Gras
Chart (1972)	Position
German Albums (Offizielle Top 100)	43

== Certifications ==
Certifications for Mardi Gras
Region	Certification	Certified units/sales
United States (RIAA)	Gold	500,000^{^}
^{^} Shipments figures based on certification alone.
