= Creedence Clearwater Revival (album) =

Studio album by Creedence Clearwater Revival
- Released: May 28, 1968
- Recorded: October 1967; January-February 1968
- Studio: Coast Recorders (San Francisco)
- Genres: Swamp rock; blues rock; rock and roll
- Length: 33:17
- Label: Fantasy
- Producers: Saul Zaentz; John Fogerty

Creedence Clearwater Revival chronology
Creedence Clearwater Revival (1968)	Bayou Country (1969)

Singles from Creedence Clearwater Revival
- 1. "Porterville" Released: January 1968; 2. "Suzie Q" Released: August 1968; 3. "I Put a Spell on You" Released: October 1968

Creedence Clearwater Revival is the debut studio album by the American rock band Creedence Clearwater Revival, released in May 1968 by Fantasy Records in the US. Featuring the band's first hit single, "Suzie Q," which reached number 11 in the US charts, it was recorded shortly after the band changed its name from the Golliwogs and began developing a signature swamp rock sound.

== Background ==
While "Suzie Q" proved to be a hit, the band had already played for three years as the Golliwogs, releasing numerous singles without achieving any breakthrough success. However, in October 1967, Saul Zaentz bought Fantasy Records and offered the band a chance to record a full-length album on the condition that they change their name. Having never liked 'the Golliwogs,' the four readily agreed, coming up with Creedence Clearwater Revival instead. At this point, John Fogerty took charge of the group artistically. He would go on to write all but one of the band's hit singles while assuming the roles of singer, lead guitarist, producer and arranger of nearly everything that appeared on both this seminal release and the group's subsequent studio albums.

== Composition ==
"Porterville," which was the last single recorded by the band under the name the Golliwogs in October 1967, was released in January 1968 as CCR's debut single. The song was a breakthrough of sorts for Fogerty, as it revealed his nascent songwriting talents. In an interview with Tom Pinnock of Uncut in 2012, he stated: "It's semi-autobiographical; I touch on my father, but it's a flight of fantasy, too. And I knew when I was doing it, 'Man, I'm on to something here.' Everything changed after that. I gave up trying to write sappy love songs about stuff I didn't know anything about, and I started inventing stories."

Additionally, the album includes the only co-write between John and his brother Tom Fogerty to appear on a Creedence album, "Walk on the Water." The song had previously been released in 1966 under the Golliwogs name, but unlike "Porterville," this version was a completely new recording. The album features three other John Fogerty originals: "The Working Man," "Get Down Woman," and "Gloomy."

It also includes the band's first charting single, "Suzie Q," which had been a hit for Dale Hawkins in 1957. CCR's version was released as a single split into parts one and two on its A and B sides, respectively. Fogerty stated in a 1993 interview with Rolling Stone magazine that his purpose in recording "Suzie Q" was to get the song played on KMPX, a free-form progressive rock radio station in San Francisco, which is why the song was extended to eight minutes in length. "'Suzie Q' was designed to fit right in," he explained. "The eight-minute opus. Feedback. Like [the Paul Butterfield Blues Band's] 'East-West'. And especially the little effect, the little telephone-box [vocal] in the middle, which is the only part I regret now. It's just funny sounding. But, lo and behold, it worked!"

The guitarist on the original Hawkins version, James Burton, would also exert a major influence on Fogerty, with the singer telling Lynne Margolis of American Songwriter: "James Burton was a huge influence on me going back to when I was a child, when I bought that record, 'Suzie Q,' and that was James Burton playing that guitar—which I didn't know at the time, of course."

In 1998, Fogerty stated to Harold Steinblatt of Guitar World that the recording of "Suzie Q" was "very pivotal" in another respect:

It established how we would work for the next few years. After we finished recording our parts, the other guys hung around while I mixed. The problem was they were making all these comments like, "Well, that won't work. This won't work." You know, they were having a great time laughing... And that was the very last time I ever allowed them to be around when I mixed a record... Basically, we'd go in, we'd record the band, and then I'd throw them out of the studio. I just couldn't have them around while I was doing overdubs or when I was mixing, because they weren't very constructive.

The final single from the album was also a cover, "I Put a Spell on You" by Screamin' Jay Hawkins. Released as a follow-up to "Suzie Q" in October 1968 with "Walk on the Water" as the B-side, it peaked on the U.S. charts at number 58.

The album was remastered and reissued on 180 gram vinyl by Analogue Productions in 2006.

== Reception ==
Professional ratings
Review scores
Source	Rating
AllMusic	4/5 stars
Encyclopedia of Popular Music	3/5 stars
Rolling Stone	(negative)

While the band did achieve success with their charting debut, critical acclaim was harder to garner. Barry Gifford writing in Rolling Stone stated: "The only bright spot in the group is John Fogerty, who plays lead guitar and does the vocals. He's a better-than-average singer (really believable in Wilson Pickett's "Ninety-Nine and a Half"), and an interesting guitarist. But there's nothing else here. The drummer is monotonous, the bass lines are all repetitious and the rhythm guitar is barely audible." Time has been far kinder to the album, although critics note that Fogerty's songwriting talent had yet to truly blossom as it would on the band's subsequent releases.

On AllMusic the album received 4 stars (out of 5), with Stephen Thomas Erlewine stating: "Released in the summer of 1968 - a year after the Summer of Love, but still in the thick of the Age of Aquarius - Creedence Clearwater Revival's self-titled debut album was gloriously out-of-step with the times, teeming with John Fogerty's Americana fascinations." He also noted that the album "points the way to the breakthrough of Bayou Country, with "Porterville" being "an exceptional song with great hooks, an underlying sense of menace, and the first inkling of the working-class rage that fueled such landmarks as 'Fortunate Son.'"

The album was first certified Gold by the RIAA on December 16, 1970, then Platinum twenty years later on December 13, 1990.

== Track listing ==
All songs written by John Fogerty, except where noted. All tracks recorded January-February 1968, except "Porterville" (October 1967) and where indicated.

Side one
No.	Title	Writer(s)	Length
1.	"I Put a Spell on You"	Screamin' Jay Hawkins	4:30
2.	"The Working Man"		3:03
3.	"Suzie Q"	Dale Hawkins, Eleanor Broadwater, Stan Lewis	8:35

Side two
No.	Title	Writer(s)	Length
1.	"Ninety-Nine and a Half (Won't Do)"	Steve Cropper, Eddie Floyd, Wilson Pickett	3:36
2.	"Get Down Woman"		3:08
3.	"Porterville"		2:19
4.	"Gloomy"		3:48
5.	"Walk on the Water"	John Fogerty, Tom Fogerty	4:35

40th anniversary edition CD bonus tracks
No.	Title	Writer(s)	Length
9.	"Call It Pretending" (B-side of "Porterville")		2:10
10.	"Before You Accuse Me" (1968 outtake)	Ellas McDaniel	3:26
11.	"Ninety-Nine and a Half Won't Do" (live at the Fillmore, San Francisco, California, March 14, 1969)		3:45
12.	"Suzie Q" (live at the Fillmore, San Francisco, California, March 14, 1969)		11:45

== Personnel ==
Creedence Clearwater Revival

- John Fogerty – lead vocal, lead guitar, piano, tambourine, maracas, wind-up toys, backing vocals
- Tom Fogerty – rhythm guitar, backing vocals
- Stu Cook – bass guitar, backing vocals
- Doug Clifford – drums, backing vocals

Production

- Producer – Saul Zaentz, John Fogerty
- Engineer – Walt Payne
- Cover Photography – Ralph Flynn
- Cover Artwork – Laurie Clifford
- Typography – Melvin/Halton Typography
- Liner Notes – Ralph J. Gleason

== Charts ==
1968 weekly chart performance for Creedence Clearwater Revival
Chart (1968)	Peak position
Japanese Albums (Oricon)	92
US Billboard 200	52

1996 weekly chart performance for Creedence Clearwater Revival
Chart (1996)	Peak position
Norwegian Albums (VG-lista)	29

== Certifications ==
Certifications for Creedence Clearwater Revival
Region	Certification	Certified units/sales
United States (RIAA)	Platinum	1,000,000^{^}
^{^} Shipments figures based on certification alone.
