= Pendulum (Creedence Clearwater Revival album) =

1970 studio album by Creedence Clearwater Revival

Studio album by Creedence Clearwater Revival
- Released: December 9, 1970
- Recorded: November 1970
- Studio: Wally Heider (San Francisco)
- Genre: Swamp rock
- Length: 40:56
- Label: Fantasy
- Producer: John Fogerty

Creedence Clearwater Revival chronology
Cosmo's Factory (1970)	Pendulum (1970)	Mardi Gras (1972)

Singles from Pendulum
- 1. "Have You Ever Seen the Rain" / "Hey Tonight" Released: January 1971

Pendulum is the sixth studio album by the American rock band Creedence Clearwater Revival, released by Fantasy Records on December 9, 1970. It was the second studio album the band released that year, arriving five months after Cosmo's Factory. It is also the final album with guitarist Tom Fogerty, who left the band shortly after the recording sessions concluded to start a solo career, though this wouldn't be officially announced until February 1, 1971.

== Background ==
The album was recorded at Wally Heider Studios in San Francisco and took a month to complete, an unusually long time for the band. A band meeting before the sessions saw Tom Fogerty, Stu Cook and Doug Clifford demanding that bandleader John Fogerty allow them greater creative input. With the backlog of John's songs already released earlier that year on Cosmo's Factory, the band entered the studio planning to jam and experiment, but no new songs materialized from this method. John disclosed that he regretted this way of working:

The guys didn't want to do the work. They just wanted to go into the studio and come up with songs by osmosis, spontaneous combustion ... At some point after a few days, I started to go home after the daily session and write. ... The meticulous preparation was gone. ... Pendulum happened during a period in my life when my head started to feel really dry. I don't know exactly how to describe it or what it means, but my head felt physically dry. I still worked as hard on Pendulum but there aren't as many great songs.

John wrote "Have You Ever Seen the Rain" about the band's impending breakup. The closing instrumental "Rude Awakening #2," a venture into avant-garde psychedelia inspired by the Beatles' "Revolution 9," was later dismissed by various band members as "embarrassing" and "free-form nonsense."

Pendulum is the last Creedence album to be produced solely by John Fogerty.

== Musical style ==
Pendulum expands the band's sonic palette with instruments such as John's keyboards and saxophones, as well as Cook's contributions on piano. Various bandmembers also played harmonica, vibraphone, recorder and percussion. John played Hammond B-3 organ on many Pendulum tracks, notably in "Have You Ever Seen the Rain," inspired by Booker T. & the M.G.'s, a group he had long idolized. When Clifford played the album for Duck Dunn and Steve Cropper of the M.G.'s, they commented that it sounded remarkably similar to the playing of their bandmate Booker T. Jones.

== Release and reception ==
Professional ratings
Review scores
Source	Rating
AllMusic	4/5 stars
Christgau's Record Guide	A−
Encyclopedia of Popular Music	3/5 stars

Pendulum was released in December 1970 and proved to be another hit for the band, charting within the top 10 in 10 countries, and peaking at No. 5 on the Billboard 200. The only single taken from the album, "Have You Ever Seen the Rain"/"Hey Tonight," was released in January 1971, and reached number eight on the Billboard Hot 100 chart.

Robert Christgau of The Village Voice enjoyed the album and rated it an A−, despite criticizing "Molina" and "Pagan Baby" as "slightly subpar," "Sailor's Lament" as "a little more so," and "Rude Awakening #2" as "a pretentious moment I hope—and expect—he [John Fogerty] has the sense never to repeat." However, he praised the other six songs on the album as "so superpar Steve Barri or Tommy James would kill (or least steal) for them. Ho hum, another Creedence album." Stephen Thomas Erlewine of Allmusic said the album "isn't transcendent" like their previous work, but nevertheless called it a "grower," praising John Fogerty's expansion of their sound.

== Track listing ==
All tracks are written by John Fogerty.

Side one
No.	Title	Length
1.	"Pagan Baby"	6:25
2.	"Sailor's Lament"	3:47
3.	"Chameleon"	3:05
4.	"Have You Ever Seen the Rain"	2:39
5.	"(Wish I Could) Hideaway"	3:53

Side two
No.	Title	Length
1.	"Born to Move"	5:39
2.	"Hey Tonight"	2:43
3.	"It's Just a Thought"	3:45
4.	"Molina"	2:41
5.	"Rude Awakening #2"	6:19

40th Anniversary Edition CD bonus tracks
No.	Title	Length
11.	"45 Revolutions Per Minute (Part 1)"	3:17
12.	"45 Revolutions Per Minute (Part 2)"	7:19
13.	"Hey Tonight" (Live in Hamburg September 17, 1971)	2:30

Tracks 11 and 12 on the 40th Anniversary Edition CD are musique concrète tracks in the vein of "Revolution 9", including tongue-in-cheek interviews with band members.

== Personnel ==
Performers

- John Fogerty – vocals, lead guitar, piano, organ, Fender Rhodes electric piano, saxophone, percussion
- Tom Fogerty – rhythm guitar, percussion
- Stu Cook – bass guitar, double bass, piano, kalimba, percussion
- Doug Clifford – drums, percussion

Production

- John Fogerty – producer, arranger
- Russ Gary – engineer, mixing
- Ed Caraeff – photography
- Baron Wolman – photography
- Richard Edlund – cover design
- Wayne Kimbell – cover design
- Kevin Gray – remastering
- Steve Hoffman – remastering
- Joel Selvin – CD liner notes

== Charts ==
=== Weekly charts ===
Weekly chart performance for Pendulum
Chart (1970–1971)	Peak position
Australian Albums (Kent Music Report)	1
Canada Top Albums/CDs (RPM)	2
Dutch Albums (Album Top 100)	2
German Albums (Offizielle Top 100)	3
Finnish Albums (The Official Finnish Charts)	1
Italian Albums (Musica e Dischi)	3
Japanese Albums (Oricon)	2
Norwegian Albums (VG-lista)	1
UK Albums (Official Charts)	8
US Billboard 200	5
US Top R&B/Hip-Hop Albums (Billboard)	28

=== Year-end charts ===
Year-end chart performance for Pendulum
Chart (1971)	Position
German Albums (Offizielle Top 100)	5

== Certifications ==
Certifications for Pendulum
Region	Certification	Certified units/sales
Finland (Musiikkituottajat)	Gold	20,000
United States (RIAA)	Platinum	1,000,000^{^}
^{^} Shipments figures based on certification alone.
