= Up Around the Bend =

Single by Creedence Clearwater Revival

from the album Cosmo's Factory
- A-side: "Run Through the Jungle"
- Released: April 1970
- Genre: Rock; hard rock
- Length: 2:41
- Label: Fantasy Records
- Songwriter: John Fogerty
- Producer: John Fogerty

Creedence Clearwater Revival singles chronology
"Travelin' Band" (1970)	"Up Around the Bend" (1970)	"Lookin' Out My Back Door" (1970)

"Up Around the Bend" is a song by American rock band Creedence Clearwater Revival, written by the band's frontman John Fogerty. It was composed and recorded only a few days prior to the band's April 1970 European tour and was included on the album Cosmo's Factory. Released as a single, with "Run Through the Jungle" on the flipside, the double-sided single climbed to number four on the Billboard Hot 100 chart in the spring of 1970.

It was certified platinum by the RIAA for sales of over one million copies. It was also a major hit in the UK, where it reached number three on the UK Singles Chart and was certified silver by the BPI.

The song opens with a prominent, high-pitched guitar riff played by John Fogerty. The lyrics have Fogerty telling of a gathering "up around the bend" on the highway and inviting the listener to join in.

Cash Box described the song as a "powerfully sung and played bit of rock with excellent top forty drive." Record World called the single release with "Run Through the Jungle" a "two-sided monster."

The song has been covered by artists such as Elton John, who recorded a version early in his career, and Hanoi Rocks, who took it to number four in their home country of Finland. A variation of the song performed by Fogerty and Eric Church is used as the theme music for Amazon Prime Video's coverage of the NASCAR Cup Series.

== Charts ==
Chart (1970)	Peak position
Australia (Kent Music Report)	1
Austria (Ö3 Austria Top 40)	3
Belgium (Ultratop 50 Flanders)	2
Canada (RPM 100 Singles)	1
France (IFOP)	23
Ireland (IRMA)	3
Netherlands (Single Top 100)	1
New Zealand (Listener)	4
Norway (VG-lista)	2
South Africa (Springbok)	6
Switzerland (Schweizer Hitparade)	6
UK Singles (Official Charts)	3
United States (Billboard Hot 100)	4
West Germany (GfK)	3

== Certifications ==
Region	Certification	Certified units/sales
New Zealand (RMNZ)	Platinum	30,000^{‡}
United Kingdom (BPI)	Silver	200,000^{‡}
United States (RIAA)	2× Platinum	2,000,000^{‡}
^{‡} Sales+streaming figures based on certification alone.
