= Creedence Clearwater Revival =

American rock band (1959–1972)

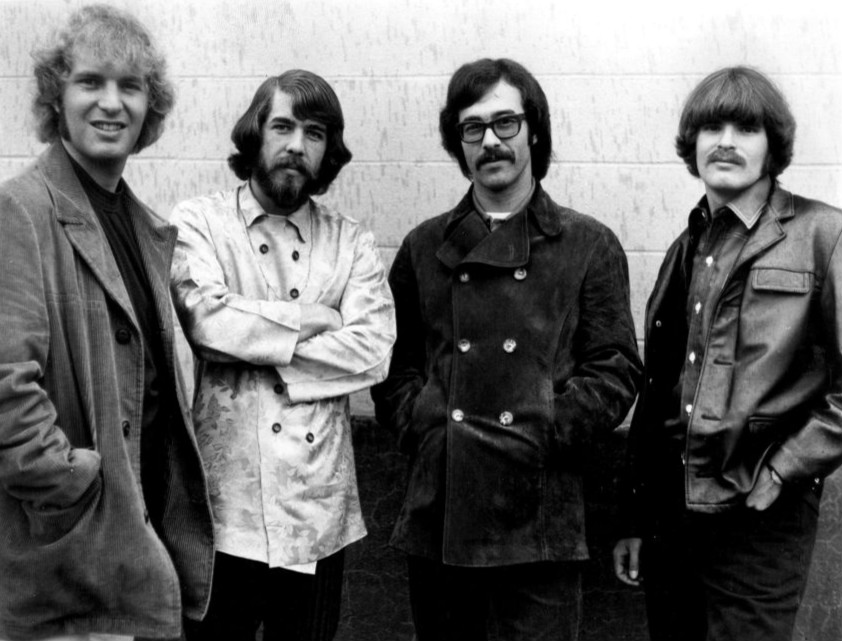
- Creedence Clearwater Revival in 1968. From left to right: Tom Fogerty, Doug Clifford, Stu Cook and John Fogerty

Background information
- Also known as: The Blue Velvets; Tommy Fogerty and the Blue Velvets (1959–1964); Vision; The Golliwogs (1964–1967)
- Origin: El Cerrito, California, U.S.
- Genres: Swamp rock; roots rock; blues rock; country rock; Southern rock
- Works: Creedence Clearwater Revival discography
- Years active: 1968–1972 (Note: One-off reunions: 1974, 1980, 1983)
- Label: Fantasy
- Spinoffs: Creedence Clearwater Revisited
- Past members: John Fogerty; Tom Fogerty; Stu Cook; Doug Clifford
- Logo

Creedence Clearwater Revival (CCR), or simply Creedence, was an American rock band formed in El Cerrito, California, in 1968. The band consisted of lead vocalist, lead guitarist, and primary songwriter John Fogerty; his brother, rhythm guitarist Tom Fogerty; bassist Stu Cook; and drummer Doug Clifford. These members had played together since 1959, first as the Blue Velvets and later as the Golliwogs, before settling on Creedence Clearwater Revival in 1968. The band's most prolific and successful period, between 1969 and 1971, produced 14 consecutive top-10 singles (many of which were double A-sides) and five consecutive top-10 albums in the United States, two of which—Green River (1969) and Cosmo's Factory (1970)—topped the Billboard 200 chart. The band performed at the 1969 Woodstock festival in upstate New York and was the first major act signed to appear there.

CCR disbanded acrimoniously in 1972 after four years of chart-topping success. Tom had quit the band at the end of 1970 and John was at odds with the remaining members over matters of business and artistic control, all of which resulted in lawsuits among the former bandmates after the group's breakup. John's disagreements with Fantasy Records owner Saul Zaentz led to more court cases, and he refused to perform with the two other surviving members of the band—Tom had died in 1990—at Creedence's induction into the Rock and Roll Hall of Fame in 1993. Though the band has never publicly reunited, John continues to perform CCR songs as part of his solo act, while Cook and Clifford performed as Creedence Clearwater Revisited from 1995 to 2020.

CCR's music remains popular and is a staple of U.S. classic rock radio airplay. The compilation album Chronicle: The 20 Greatest Hits, originally released in 1976, is still on the Billboard 200 and reached the 750-week mark in June 2025. It has been certified 12-times platinum by the Recording Industry Association of America for sales of at least 12 million copies in the U.S.

== History ==
=== Early career: The Blue Velvets (1959–1964) ===
John Fogerty, Doug Clifford, and Stu Cook met at Portola Junior High School in El Cerrito, California. Calling themselves the Blue Velvets, the trio predominantly played instrumental covers of acts such as The Ventures and Duane Eddy, coupled with a selection of "jukebox standards" that Fogerty sang on. The Blue Velvets backed John's older brother Tom at recordings and performances before he joined the band, at which point the band was renamed Tommy Fogerty & The Blue Velvets. The band also released three singles, the second of which was picked up by Casey Kasem, who worked at KEWB in Oakland. In 1964 they signed with Fantasy Records, an independent jazz label in San Francisco. The band was attracted to the label after hearing Vince Guaraldi's instrumental "Cast Your Fate to the Wind," which the label had released to national success.

=== Vision and the Golliwogs (1964–1967) ===
For the band's first release, Fantasy co-owner Max Weiss renamed the group the Golliwogs (after the children's book character Golliwog). Prior to the Golliwog name, Weiss had renamed them Vision. The band members' roles changed during this period; Cook switched from piano to bass guitar and Tom Fogerty from lead vocals to rhythm guitar; John became the band's lead vocalist and primary songwriter. In Tom's words: "I could sing, but John had a sound!" For their work with this band, Tom took on the name "Rann Wild" and John became "Toby Green." Both sides of each of the group's first six singles, all issued between 1964 and 1966, were credited to the writing team of Wild/Green.

In 1966, John Fogerty and Doug Clifford were drafted into the U.S. armed forces; Fogerty joined the U.S. Army Reserve, while Clifford joined the U.S. Coast Guard Reserve. Speaking of the incessant marching he experienced in the US Army, Fogerty has said: "I would become delirious and go into a trance. And I started narrating this story to myself, which was the song 'Porterville'." John Fogerty eventually took control of the group, singing lead vocals and blossoming into a multi-instrumentalist who played keyboards, harmonica, and saxophone in addition to lead guitar. By 1967, he was producing the group's recordings, although without credit. The group's final single, "Porterville," failed to chart (like every other Golliwogs recording), but the same recording was reissued soon after as a track on Creedence Clearwater Revival's first album.

=== Name change to Creedence Clearwater Revival (1968–1969) ===
In 1967, Saul Zaentz bought Fantasy Records and offered the band a chance to record an album. Having hated the name "the Golliwogs" from the start, the band decided on their own name, Creedence Clearwater Revival (CCR), which they formally assumed in January 1968. According to interviews with the band members, the name's elements came from three sources: Tom Fogerty's friend Credence Newball, whose name they changed to form the word Creedence (as in creed); a television commercial for Olympia Brewing Company ("clear water"); and the four members' renewed commitment to their band. Rejected contenders for the band's name included "Muddy Rabbit," "Gossamer Wump," and "Creedence Nuball and the Ruby;" the last was the starting point, though, from which the band derived its final name. Cook described the name as "weirder than Buffalo Springfield or Jefferson Airplane." In early 1968, the band began appearing regularly at clubs and venues in the San Francisco area, including Deno and Carlo's, the Avalon Ballroom and the Fillmore West. Later that year, the group began touring across the US and made their first appearances in New York City at the Fillmore East.

By 1968, AM radio programmers around the U.S. took note when CCR's cover of the 1956 rockabilly song "Susie Q" received substantial airplay in the San Francisco Bay area and on Chicago's WLS-AM. It was the band's second single, its first to reach the top 40 (number 11), and its only top-40 hit not written by John Fogerty. Two other singles were released from their May 1968 self-titled debut album, a cover of Screamin' Jay Hawkins' "I Put a Spell on You" (number 58) and "Porterville" (released on the Scorpio label with writing credited to "T. Spicebush Swallowtail"), written during Fogerty's time in the Army Reserve.

=== Peak success (1969–1970) ===
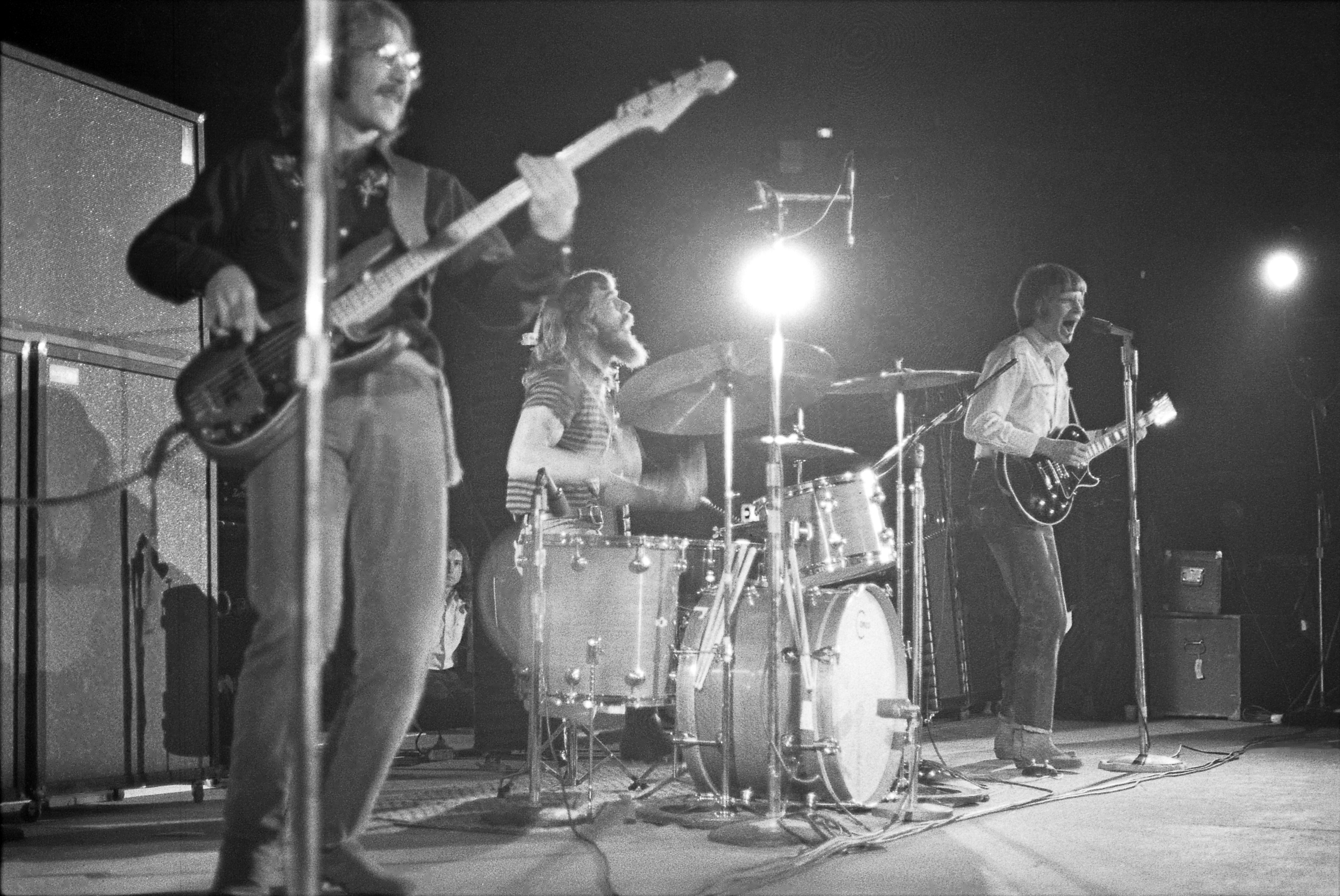
CCR in concert in Inglewood, California, December 1969

After their breakthrough, CCR began touring and started work on their second album, Bayou Country, at RCA Studios in Los Angeles. It was released in January 1969. A number-seven platinum hit, the record was their first in a string of hit albums and singles that continued uninterruptedly for two years. The single "Proud Mary," backed with "Born on the Bayou," reached number two on the national Billboard chart. The former eventually became the group's most covered song, with over 100 versions by other artists to date, including the number 4 hit by Ike & Tina Turner in 1971, two years to the week after the original peaked. John cites this song as being the result of the euphoria he experienced on gaining his discharge from the Army Reserve. The album also featured a cover of the rock and roll classic "Good Golly, Miss Molly" and the band's nine-minute live-show closer, "Keep On Chooglin'."

Months later, in April 1969, "Bad Moon Rising" backed with "Lodi" was released and peaked at number 2 in the US. In the United Kingdom, "Bad Moon Rising" spent three weeks at number 1 on the UK Singles Chart during September and October 1969, becoming the band's only number-one single in the UK. The band's third album, Green River, which followed in August 1969, was their first album to top the Billboard 200 and went gold, along with the single "Green River," which also reached number 2 on the Billboard charts. "Commotion," the B-side of "Green River," peaked at number 30, and the band's emphasis on covers of old favorites continued with "Night Time Is the Right Time."

CCR continued to tour frequently, with performances in July 1969 at the Atlanta Pop Festival and in August 1969 at the Woodstock Festival. At Woodstock, the band took the stage in the early morning, hours after their scheduled start-time. They followed the Grateful Dead, who John claimed had put the audience to sleep. As he scanned the audience he saw a "Dante scene, just bodies from hell, all intertwined and asleep, covered with mud." In addition to the low-energy crowd, the band also experienced issues with their equipment and lighting, resulting in Fogerty vetoing their inclusion in the Woodstock film or soundtrack. Doug Cook, however, praised their set, saying, "The performances are classic CCR, and I'm still amazed by the number of people who don't even know we were one of the headliners at Woodstock '69."

Creedence Clearwater Revival ... were progressive and anachronistic at the same time. An unapologetic throwback to the golden era of rock and roll, they broke ranks with their peers on the progressive, psychedelic San Francisco scene. Their approach was basic and uncompromising, holding true to the band members' working-class origins. The term "roots rock" had not yet been invented when Creedence came along, but in essence, they defined it, drawing inspiration from the likes of Little Richard, Hank Williams, Elvis Presley, Chuck Berry, and the artisans of soul at Motown and Stax. In so doing, Creedence Clearwater Revival became the standard bearers and foremost celebrants of homegrown American music.

— Rock and Roll Hall of Fame

After Woodstock, CCR were busy honing material for a fourth album, Willy and the Poor Boys, their second top-three LP. It was released in November 1969. "Down on the Corner" and "Fortunate Son," both of which they performed on The Ed Sullivan Show on November 16, 1969, climbed to number 3 and number 14, respectively, by year's end. The album featured Fogerty originals and two reworked Lead Belly covers, "Cotton Fields" and "Midnight Special." The year 1969 had been remarkable for the band - three top-10 albums, four hit singles (three charting at number 2, and one at number 3) with three additional charting B-sides.

CCR released another double A-side hit, "Travelin' Band"/"Who'll Stop the Rain," in January 1970. The up-tempo "Travelin' Band," with a strong Little Richard sound, bore enough similarities to "Good Golly, Miss Molly" to warrant a lawsuit by the song's publisher; it was eventually settled out of court. The song ultimately topped out at number 2. The band also recorded its January 31, 1970, live performance at the Oakland Coliseum Arena, which was later marketed as a live album and television special. In February, CCR was featured on the cover of Rolling Stone, with John being interviewed in the accompanying article.

In April 1970, CCR were set to begin their first European tour. To support the upcoming live dates, John wrote "Up Around the Bend" and "Run Through the Jungle;" both sides of the single reached number 4 that spring. The band returned to Wally Heider Studios in San Francisco in June to record Cosmo's Factory. The album contained the earlier released top-10 hits "Travelin' Band" and "Up Around the Bend," plus popular album tracks such as the opener "Ramble Tamble."

Cosmo's Factory was released in July 1970, remaining at number 1 on the album charts in the US for nine weeks. It was released along with the band's fifth and final number 2 national hit, "Lookin' Out My Back Door"/"Long as I Can See the Light." Although they topped some international charts and local radio countdowns, CCR have the distinction of having had five number-two singles without ever having had a number-one on the Hot 100, the most of any group to date. Their five number-two singles were exceeded only by Madonna (six), Taylor Swift (ten), and Drake (thirteen), and tied with Elvis Presley and the Carpenters. Conversely, on station WLS-AM, the band had three number-ones, four number-threes, and two number-fours, but no number-two singles, with "Down on the Corner" the only top-10 CCR single registering the same peak position (number 3) on the Hot 100 and on WLS.

Other cuts on the Cosmo's Factory album included an 11-minute jam of Marvin Gaye’s 1968 cover of "I Heard It Through the Grapevine" (a minor hit for CCR when an edited version was released as a single in 1976), and a nearly note-for-note homage to Roy Orbison's "Ooby Dooby." The album was their biggest seller, going to number 1 on the Billboard 200 album charts and number 11 on Billboard Soul Albums chart.

Pendulum, released in December 1970, was another top seller, spawning a top-10 hit with "Have You Ever Seen the Rain?." John played the Hammond B3 organ on many of the album tracks, notably on "Have You Ever Seen the Rain?," in recognition of the enduring respect he had for Booker T. & the M.G.'s, and the influence that group had on Creedence. The single's flip side, "Hey Tonight," was also a hit.

=== Tom Fogerty's departure, discord, and breakup (1971–1972) ===
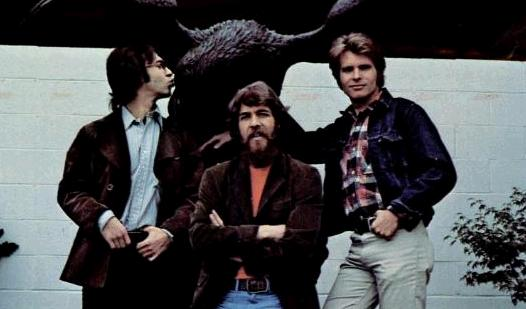
Trade advertisement for the release of CCR's single "Sweet Hitch-Hiker" in July 1971

CCR in 1972 after Tom Fogerty's departure; John Fogerty, Stu Cook, Doug Clifford

Despite their ongoing success, a perception arose among the other band members that John was being overly controlling. A group meeting was arranged in October 1970 just prior to the Pendulum recording sessions whereby John reluctantly agreed to his bandmates' demands that they be given a larger role in CCR's musical and business decisions, and that songs written and sung by them be included on future albums. Even with this new arrangement, Tom Fogerty resigned from the band at the conclusion of the Pendulum project, choosing to venture out on his own as a solo artist. His departure was made public in February of 1971. The remaining members initially considered replacing him, but ultimately continued as a trio.

CCR further put its new group approach to the test, releasing the top-10 single "Sweet Hitch-Hiker" in July 1971, backed with Cook's "Door to Door." They toured both the U.S. and Europe that summer and fall, with "Door to Door" included as part of the live set. However, in spite of their continuing commercial success, relations among the three were becoming increasingly strained.

Growing frustrated with the group's change of direction, Fogerty called for another band meeting. He informed Cook and Clifford that Creedence would continue only by adopting a "democratic" approach; each member would now write and perform his own material with each band member contributing three songs apiece to the next album. Fogerty would only contribute guitar parts to his bandmates' songs.

Conflicting views exist regarding their reaction to this proposed plan. For his part, Fogerty recounts the pair were initially excited about this new opportunity to write and perform their own songs free of his meddling and oversight, and they only soured on the concept after the record's lack of success. However, other sources suggest that Cook and Clifford were resistant to this approach from the start. Allegedly, Fogerty at one point insisted they accept the arrangement or he would quit the band.

The resulting and final album, Mardi Gras, was released in April 1972. It featured songs written by John Fogerty, Cook, and Clifford, as well as a cover of "Hello Mary Lou" (a song Gene Pitney had originally written for Ricky Nelson). Each member sang lead vocals on their own songs. The album was a critical failure, considered by critics to be of inconsistent quality and lacking in cohesion. Rolling Stone reviewer Jon Landau deemed it "relative to a group's established level of performance, the worst album I have ever heard from a major rock band." The sales of Mardi Gras were weaker than previous albums, ultimately peaking at number 12, though it still became the band's seventh consecutive studio album to be certified gold. Fogerty's "Someday Never Comes," backed with Clifford's "Tearin' Up the Country," also cracked the U.S. top 40.

By this point, John Fogerty was not only at odds with his bandmates but had also come to see the group's relationship with Fantasy Records as onerous and unsustainable, feeling that Zaentz had reneged on his promise to give the band a better contract. Cook—who held a degree in business—claimed that because of poor judgment on Fogerty's part, CCR had to abide by the worst record deal of any major U.S. recording artist.

Despite the relatively poor reception of Mardi Gras and deteriorated relationships among the remaining band members, Creedence embarked upon a two-month, 20-date U.S. tour. However, on October 16, 1972, less than six months after the tour ended, Fantasy Records and the band officially announced its disbanding. CCR never formally reunited after the breakup, although Cook and Clifford eventually started the band Creedence Clearwater Revisited.

By 1975, Tom Fogerty had also become disenchanted with Fantasy. During a radio interview with KSAN that year, he stated: "A lot of people who didn’t really have to do much of anything except distribute the records, we made them millionaires. Their lack of gratitude is mind-boggling. It crushes me sometimes, to be treated so shabbily after everything we’ve done for them, even just on a financial level. If they don’t like rock and roll, that’s one thing. It’s just the fact that they came into so much money as a result of it, and then to be treated so rudely is strange. I hope the next label I go to has a little more decency."

Stu Cook reported to biographer Hank Bordowitz: “Fantasy’s big mistake was in not treating us better. They could have made a deal with John for the ownership of his old songs, even at some point during the band’s success if not later. They could’ve given the band a better recording contract. But they’re the kind of folks who, when it suits them, will ‘live with the deal we have.’ That’s called business. In the music business, as in other mixtures with the arts, there will always be this tension.”

John Fogerty later commented on the demise of CCR in a 1997 edition of the Swedish magazine Pop:

I was alone when I made that [CCR] music. I was alone when I made the arrangements, I was alone when I added background vocals, guitars, and some other stuff. I was alone when I produced and mixed the albums. The other guys showed up only for rehearsals and the days we made the actual recordings. For me, Creedence was like sitting on a time bomb. We'd had decent successes with our cover of "Susie Q" and with the first album, when we went into the studio to cut "Proud Mary". It was the first time we were in a real Hollywood studio, RCA's Los Angeles studio, and the problems started immediately. The other guys in the band insisted on writing songs for the new album, they had opinions on the arrangements, they wanted to sing. They went as far as adding background vocals to "Proud Mary", and it sounded awful. They used tambourines, and it sounded no better. That's when I understood I had a choice to make. At that point in time, we were just a one-hit wonder, and "Susie Q" hadn't really been that big a hit. Either this [the new album] would be a success, something really big, or we might as well start working at the car wash again. There was a big row. We went to an Italian restaurant and I remember that I very clearly told the others that I for one didn't want to go back to the car wash again. Now, we had to make the best possible album and it wasn't important who did what, as long as the result was the very best we could achieve. And of course I was the one who should do it. I don't think the others really understood what I meant, but at least I could manage the situation the way I wanted. The result was eight million-selling, double-sided singles in a row and six albums, [which] all went platinum. And Melody Maker had us as the best band in the world. That was after the Beatles split, but still. ... And I was the one who had created all this. Despite that, I don't think they understood what I was talking about. ... They were obsessed with the idea of more control and more influence. So finally, the bomb exploded, and we never worked together again.

== Post-breakup ==
=== John Fogerty ===
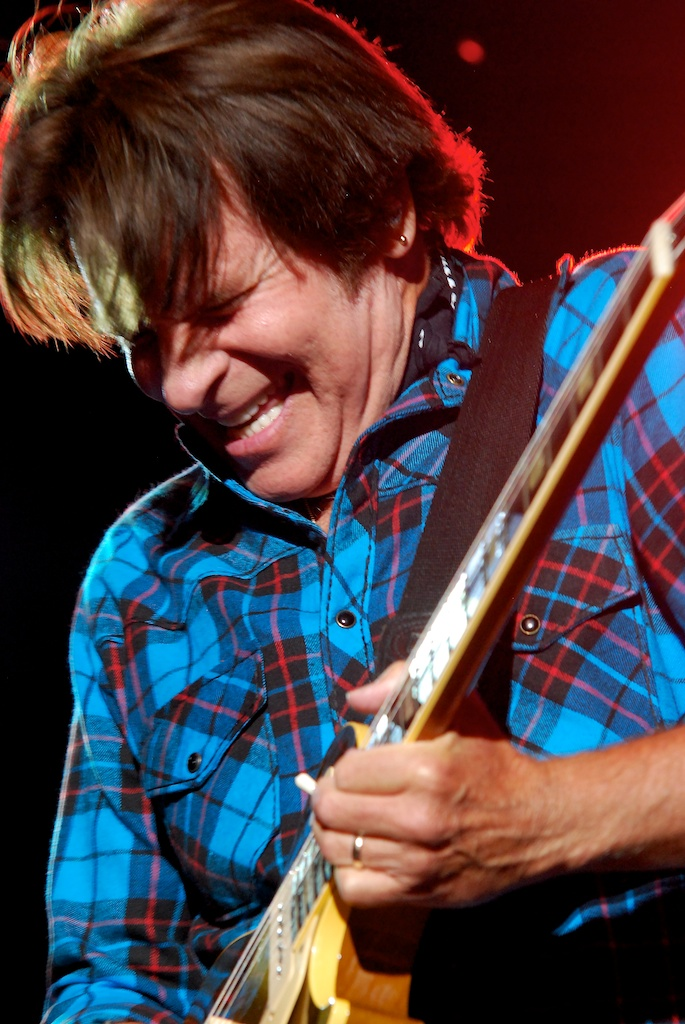
John Fogerty performing in 2011

In 1973, John Fogerty began his solo career with The Blue Ridge Rangers release, his one man band collection of country and gospel songs. Under his old CCR contract, however, he owed Fantasy eight more records. In the end, he refused to work for the label. The impasse was resolved only when David Geffen, head of Asylum Records, bought Fogerty's contract for $1 million. In 1975, he released his only Asylum album, the self-titled John Fogerty. His next major release was Centerfield, a chart-topping success in 1985. On tour in 1986, however, he endured complaints over his steadfast refusal to perform CCR songs and suffered with recurring vocal problems, which he blamed on having to testify repeatedly in court. Fogerty's explanation for not playing CCR material was that he would have had to pay performance royalties to copyright holder Zaentz, and that it was "too painful" to revisit the music of his past.

With the Centerfield album, he also found himself entangled in new lawsuits with Zaentz over the song "The Old Man Down the Road," which, according to Zaentz, was a blatant rewrite of Fogerty's former 1970 CCR hit "Run Through the Jungle." Since John had traded his rights to CCR's songs in 1980 to cancel his remaining contractual obligations, Fantasy now owned the rights to "Run Through the Jungle" and sued him essentially for plagiarizing himself. While a jury ruled in Fogerty's favor, he did settle a defamation suit filed by Zaentz over the songs "Mr. Greed" and "Zanz Kant Danz." He was forced to edit the recording, changing the "Zanz" reference to "Vanz."

On February 19, 1987, at the Palomino Club in North Hollywood, Fogerty broke his self-imposed ban on performing Creedence hits. Bob Dylan and George Harrison, along with Taj Mahal and Jesse Ed Davis, had joined him onstage, admonishing, "If you don't, the whole world's gonna think 'Proud Mary' is Tina Turner's song." At a 1987 Independence Day benefit concert for Vietnam veterans, he finally ran through the list of Creedence hits, beginning with "Born on the Bayou" and ending with "Proud Mary." In 1986, he also released his second album on Warner Bros., Eye of the Zombie. Fogerty retreated from music again in the late 1980s but returned in 1997 with the Grammy-winning Blue Moon Swamp. He still tours frequently and now performs CCR classics alongside his solo material.

=== Tom Fogerty ===
Tom Fogerty released several solo albums, though none reached the success of his former group. His 1974 solo album, Zephyr National, was the last to feature the four original CCR band members on the track "Mystic Isle of Avalon," although John recorded his parts separately. Several tracks sound similar to the CCR style, particularly the aptly titled "Joyful Resurrection." His album Excalibur featured all four members of the Jerry Garcia Band (who recorded live albums for Fantasy). Garcia played lead guitar to Tom's rhythm guitar, and the album has since become a popular "cult" item.

Tom died at his home in Scottsdale, Arizona, in September 1990 of an AIDS complication, which he contracted from a tainted blood transfusion he received while undergoing back surgery. Tom and John never fully reconciled before Tom's death, and in the eulogy that he delivered at Tom's funeral, John said, "We wanted to grow up and be musicians. I guess we achieved half of that, becoming rock 'n roll stars. We didn't necessarily grow up."

=== Stu Cook and Doug Clifford ===
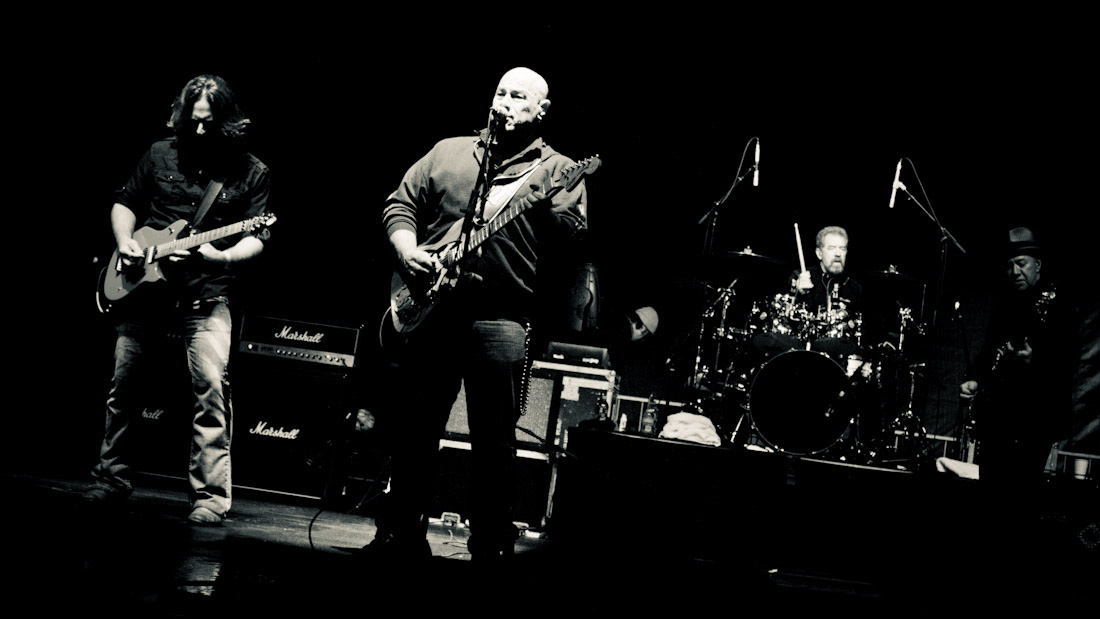
CCR's rhythm section formed Creedence Clearwater Revisited in 1995

Junior high school friends Doug Clifford and Stu Cook continued to work together following the demise of CCR, both as session players and members of the Don Harrison Band. With recording engineer Russ Gary, they also founded Factory Productions, a mobile recording service in the Bay Area. Clifford released a solo record, Cosmo, in 1972. Cook produced Roky Erickson's The Evil One, and was a bassist with the popular country act Southern Pacific in the 1980s.

Clifford also produced Groovers Paradise for former Sir Douglas Quintet and Texas Tornados' frontman Doug Sahm. Both Clifford and Cook played on the album, which was released on Warner Bros. in 1974. Clifford continued to perform and record with Sahm through the 1980s.

Following a relatively long period of musical inactivity, Cook and Clifford formed Creedence Clearwater Revisited in 1995 with several well-known musicians, including Elliot Easton of the Cars. Revisited toured globally, performing the original band's classics until 2020 during the COVID-19 pandemic shutdown. A 1997 injunction by John Fogerty forced Creedence Clearwater Revisited to temporarily change its name to "Cosmo's Factory," but the courts later ruled in Cook and Clifford's favor.

=== Fantasy Records ===
After CCR, Fantasy Records released several greatest-hits packages, such as Creedence Gold (1972), More Creedence Gold (1973), and Pre-Creedence (1975), a compilation album of the Golliwogs' early recordings. In 1976, Fantasy also released the highly successful double album Chronicle, a collection of Creedence's 20 hit singles. In 1981, the label released an earlier live recording entitled The Royal Albert Hall Concert. Contrary to its title, the 1970 performance was actually recorded in Oakland, California, and not at the Royal Albert Hall in London. Subsequent issues of this album have been retitled simply The Concert. Another double album of their best material was issued in 1986 as Chronicle: Volume Two.

The success of Creedence made Fantasy Records and Zaentz a great deal of money, and Fantasy built a new headquarters building in 1971 at 2600 Tenth Street in Berkeley, California. Zaentz also used his wealth to produce a number of successful films, including Best Picture Oscar winners One Flew Over the Cuckoo's Nest, Amadeus, and The English Patient.

In 2004, Zaentz sold Fantasy to Concord Records. John Fogerty then purchased from Concord a majority stake in the global rights to the Creedence Clearwater Revival songs he had written. In 2005, the label released The Long Road Home, a collection of Creedence and Fogerty solo classics. After Revival came out on the Fantasy label in October 2007, Fogerty switched to his own label, Fortunate Son Records, distributed by Verve Forecast Records. Blue Ridge Rangers Rides Again, a sequel to his 1973 album, was then issued in 2009.

=== Reunions ===
The original Creedence lineup reunited just once for a performance after their breakup, at Tom Fogerty's wedding on October 19, 1980. Six years prior, all four members were present on the song "Mystic Aisle Avalon" on Tom's 1974 album Zephyr National, but John recorded his parts separately from the others. John, Stu, and Doug played at their 20th El Cerrito High School reunion in 1983, but as their original incarnation, the Blue Velvets. In the 1980s and 1990s, new rounds of lawsuits between the band members, as well as against their former management, deepened their differences. By the time CCR was inducted into the Rock and Roll Hall of Fame in 1993, John refused to perform with Cook and Clifford. The pair were barred from the stage, while John played with an all-star band that included Bruce Springsteen and Robbie Robertson. Tom's widow Tricia had expected a Creedence reunion and even brought the urn containing her husband's ashes to the ceremony. Furious, Stu and Doug, who were seated with their families at a table across the room from John's, walked out of the ballroom just as the performance began. They would later write letters to the Rock and Roll Hall of Fame's board of directors, saying it was "hurtful" and "insulting" to allow the performance to continue without them.

However, in a July 2011 interview with the Calgary Herald, John admitted that he would at least be willing to consider reuniting with his former bandmates:

Years ago, I looked at people and I was so full of some sort of emotion and I'd say, 'Absolutely not!' ... But I have to admit, people have asked me more recently, and even though I have no idea how such a series of events would come to pass, I can tell that there isn't the bombast in my voice, in the denial, in the refusal. It's more like, 'Well, I dunno.' Never say never is I guess is what people tell you. In this life, all kinds of strange things come to pass. Realizing that it doesn't really kick up a big firestorm of emotion, it kind of suggests that at least if someone started talking I'd sit still long enough to listen.

When asked again in October 2011 about the prospect of a reunion, he said: "I'm saying it's possible, yeah. I think the call [laughs] would maybe have to come from outside the realm. Somebody would have to get me to look at things in a fresh way." However, Cook and Clifford both stated in the February 2012 edition of Uncut magazine that they were not interested in a CCR reunion. "Leopards don't change their spots. This is just an image-polishing exercise by John. My phone certainly hasn't rung," Cook said. Added Clifford: "It might have been a nice idea 20 years ago, but it's too late."

In May 2013, Fogerty once again said he would be open to a reunion, but he does not see Cook and Clifford being willing to change their stance. He told Charlie Rose on CBS This Morning: "From time to time, I'll say something, and it'll get in print that maybe that will happen, and then immediately I'll hear back stuff that doesn't sound like it's possible... I think it's a possibility in the future, you know. It's not something I'm actively seeking, but I'm not totally against the idea either." In September 2017, Doug again ruled out any chance of Stu and himself reuniting with John, restating, "It would have been great 20, 25 years ago. It's way too late now."

== Musical style ==
Despite hailing from California, Creedence "mythologized the American South with an exotic mixture of blues, New Orleans R&B, and rockabilly," according to NPR. According to AllMusic, CCR "created a unique synthesis of punchy rock & roll, swamp pop, blues, and country." Creedence has been credited for pioneering swamp rock, roots rock, and country rock. The band also played blues rock, Southern rock, Americana and blue-eyed soul. After their seminal album release, the band became firm in their swamp and blues sound, as witnessed on tracks like "Born on the Bayou" and "Proud Mary." Their sound utilized musical traits like raspy vocals with a southern-drawl sound from Fogerty, a blues-style harmony, cowbells, and a twangy guitar sound.

The group often utilized lyrics about bayous, catfish, the Mississippi River and other elements of Southern United States iconography, though their knowledge of these subjects were mostly from second-hand association instead of lived experience. The band's songs rarely dealt with romantic love, often concentrating instead on political and socially conscious lyrics about topics such as the Vietnam War, class struggles and repression. CCR's hit "Fortunate Son" solidified itself as one of the most iconic songs of the Vietnam War protest movement, bringing attention to the U.S.'s inequitable draft policy. In the 1993 essay for their induction into the Rock N Roll Hall of Fame, Bob Merlis described their lyrics as containing "personal concerns about pride, rejection, and nostalgia for an American subculture that was fading fast."

== Legal rights ==
CCR's catalog of songs has frequently been used or referenced in popular culture, partly because John Fogerty signed away legal control of his old recordings to the band's record label, Fantasy Records. In an NPR interview, John objected to what he regarded as a misuse of his music:

Folks will remember Forrest Gump and that was a great movie, but they don't remember all the really poor movies that Fantasy Records stuck Creedence music into: car commercials, tire commercials. I'm remembering a paint thinner ad at one point, the song "Who'll Stop the Rain." Oh, boy. That's clever, isn't it?

Of particular interest was the use of his protest song "Fortunate Son" in a blue jeans commercial. In this case, the advertiser soon after stopped using the song, as Fogerty related in a later interview:

Yes, the people that owned Fantasy Records also owned all my early songs, and they would do all kinds of stuff I really hated in a commercial way with my songs. Then one day somebody from the L.A. Times actually bothered to call me up and ask me how I felt, and I finally had a chance to talk about it. And I said I'm very much against my song being used to sell pants. So my position got stated very well in the newspaper, and lo and behold, Wrangler to their credit said, "Wow, even though we made our agreement with the publisher, the owner of the song, we can see now that John Fogerty really hates the idea," so they stopped doing it.

On January 13, 2023, Fogerty announced on Twitter that he now owned the rights to the CCR global catalog after a 50-year legal battle. He bought a majority stake in the rights to the band's catalogue from Concord Records, which has owned the rights since 2004.

== Legacy ==
Rolling Stone ranked Creedence Clearwater Revival 82nd on its 100 Greatest Artists of All Time. In 2003, Rolling Stone's 500 Greatest Albums of All Time list included Green River at number 95, Cosmo's Factory at number 265, and Willy and the Poor Boys at number 392. The following year, on their 500 Greatest Songs of All Time list, Rolling Stone included "Fortunate Son" at number 99, "Proud Mary" at number 155, "Who'll Stop the Rain" at number 188, and "Bad Moon Rising" at number 355.

"Fortunate Son" was added to the Library of Congress' National Recording Registry list of sound recordings that "are culturally, historically, or aesthetically important" in 2013.

"Fortunate Son," "Proud Mary," and Cosmo's Factory have all been inducted into the Grammy Hall of Fame. "Proud Mary" is ranked at number 39 on VH1's "100 Greatest Rock Songs" list. "Bad Moon Rising" is ranked at number 363 on NME's "500 Greatest Songs of All Time" list.

== Band members ==
- John Fogerty – lead and backing vocals, lead and rhythm guitar, keyboards, harmonica, saxophone (1968–1972)
- Tom Fogerty – rhythm guitar, backing and occasional lead vocals (1968–1970, died 1990)
- Stu Cook – bass, keyboards, backing and occasional lead vocals (1968–1972)
- Doug Clifford – drums, percussion, backing and occasional lead vocals (1968–1972)

== Discography ==
=== Creedence Clearwater Revival discography ===
- Creedence Clearwater Revival (1968)
- Bayou Country (1969)
- Green River (1969)
- Willy and the Poor Boys (1969)
- Cosmo's Factory (1970)
- Pendulum (1970)
- Mardi Gras (1972)

=== The Blue Velvets discography ===
Singles
| Title | Writer(s) | Catalog ref. | Recorded | Location | Released | Vocals | Producer |
|---|---|---|---|---|---|---|---|
| "Come on Baby" | Tom Fogerty | OA-6177 | Fall 1961 | Orchestra Studios, Oakland, California | October 1961 | Tom Fogerty | |
| "Oh My Love" | Tom Fogerty | OA-6177 | Fall 1961 | Orchestra Studios, Oakland, California | October 1961 | Tom Fogerty | |
| "Have You Ever Been Lonely" | John Fogerty | OA-611010 | Late 1961 | Orchestra Studios, Oakland, California | Early 1962 | Tom Fogerty | |
| "Bonita" | John and Tom Fogerty | OA-611010 | Late 1961 | Orchestra Studios, Oakland, California | Early 1962 | Tom Fogerty | |
| "Yes You Did" | Tom Fogerty | OA-6252 201 | 1962 | Orchestra Studios, Oakland, California | June 1962 | Tom Fogerty | |
| "Now You're Not Mine" | John Fogerty | OA-6252 201 | 1962 | Orchestra Studios, Oakland, California | June 1962 | Tom Fogerty | |

=== The Golliwogs discography ===
| Title | Writer(s) | Catalog ref. | Recorded | Studio | Released | Vocals | Notes |
|---|---|---|---|---|---|---|---|
| "Don't Tell Me No Lies" | John and Tom Fogerty | Fantasy 590 | Mid 1964 | Fantasy Studios, Berkeley, California | November 1964 | John and Tom Fogerty | |
| "Little Girl (Does Your Momma Know)" | John and Tom Fogerty | Fantasy 590 | Mid 1964 | Fantasy Studios, Berkeley, California | November 1964 | Tom Fogerty | |
| "Where You Been" | John and Tom Fogerty | Fantasy 597 | January 1965 | Fantasy Studios, Berkeley, California | April 1965 | Tom Fogerty | |
| "You Came Walking" | John and Tom Fogerty | Fantasy 597 | January 1965 | Fantasy Studios, Berkeley, California | April 1965 | John and Tom Fogerty | |
| "You Can't Be True" | John and Tom Fogerty | Fantasy 599 | April 1965 | Fantasy Studios, Berkeley, California | July 1965 | John Fogerty | |
| "You Got Nothin' on Me" | John and Tom Fogerty | Fantasy 599 | April 1965 | Fantasy Studios, Berkeley, California | July 1965 | John and Tom Fogerty | |
| "I Only Met You Just an Hour Ago" | John and Tom Fogerty | | April 1965 | Fantasy Studios, Berkeley, California | 2001 | John and Tom Fogerty | |
| "Brown-Eyed Girl" | John and Tom Fogerty | Scorpio 404 | August 1965 | Fantasy Studios, Berkeley, California | November 1965 | John Fogerty | |
| "You Better Be Careful" | John and Tom Fogerty | Scorpio 404 | August 1965 | Fantasy Studios, Berkeley, California | November 1965 | John Fogerty with Tom Fogerty | |
| "Gonna Hang Around" | John and Tom Fogerty | | November 1965 | Fantasy Studios, Berkeley, California | 2001 | John Fogerty | |
| "Fight Fire" | John and Tom Fogerty | Scorpio 405 | February 1966 | Fantasy Studios, Berkeley, California | March 1966 | John Fogerty | |
| "Fragile Child" | John and Tom Fogerty | Scorpio 405 | February 1966 | Fantasy Studios, Berkeley, California | March 1966 | John Fogerty | |
| "Try Try Try" | John and Tom Fogerty | | February 1966 | Fantasy Studios, Berkeley, California | 2001 | John and Tom Fogerty | |
| "She Was Mine" | John and Tom Fogerty | | Early 1966 | Fantasy Studios, Berkeley, California | 2001 | John Fogerty | |
| "Instrumental No. 1" | John and Tom Fogerty | | Early 1966 | Fantasy Studios, Berkeley, California | 2001 | | |
| "Action USA" | | radio promotional spot | June 1966 | | | | |
| "Little Tina" | John and Tom Fogerty | | Mid 1966 | Fantasy Studios, Berkeley, California | 2001 | John Fogerty | |
| "Walking on the Water" | John and Tom Fogerty | Scorpio 408 | August 1966 | Fantasy Studios, Berkeley, California | September 1966 | John Fogerty | re-recorded as "Walk on the Water" for Creedence Clearwater Revival |
| "You Better Get It Before It Gets You" | John and Tom Fogerty | Scorpio 408 | August 1966 | Fantasy Studios, Berkeley, California | September 1966 | John Fogerty | |
| "Tell Me" | John and Tom Fogerty | Scorpio 410, cancelled | May 1967 | Fantasy Studios, Berkeley, California | 2001 | John Fogerty | |
| "You Can't Be True" | John and Tom Fogerty | Scorpio 410, cancelled | May 1967 | Fantasy Studios, Berkeley, California | 2001 | John Fogerty | |
| "Porterville" | John Fogerty | Scorpio 412 | October 1967 | Coast Recorders, San Francisco, California | November 1967 (Note: Following its release as the A-side of the last Golliwogs single, this track was re-released, in January 1968, as the A-side of the first single credited to Creedence Clearwater Revival. In July 1968, it was included on Creedence Clearwater Revival's first album.) | John Fogerty | produced by John Fogerty, later released on Creedence Clearwater Revival |
| "Call it Pretending" | John Fogerty | Scorpio 412 | October 1967 | Coast Recorders, San Francisco, California | November 1967 (Note: Following its release as the B-side of the last Golliwogs single, this track was re-released, in January 1968, as the B-side of the first single credited to Creedence Clearwater Revival.) | John Fogerty | produced by John Fogerty |

== See also ==
- John Fogerty discography
- Tom Fogerty discography
