= Lookin' out My Back Door =

Single by Creedence Clearwater Revival

from the album Cosmo's Factory
- B-side: "Long As I Can See the Light"
- Released: July 25, 1970
- Genre: Country rock
- Length: 2:35
- Label: Fantasy
- Songwriter: John Fogerty
- Producer: John Fogerty

Creedence Clearwater Revival singles chronology
"Up Around the Bend" (1970)	"Lookin' out My Back Door" (1970)	"Have You Ever Seen the Rain?" (1971)

"Lookin' out My Back Door" is a song recorded by the American band Creedence Clearwater Revival. Written by the band's lead singer, guitarist and songwriter John Fogerty, it is included on their fifth album Cosmo's Factory (1970), and became their fifth and final number-two Billboard hit, held off the top by Diana Ross's version of "Ain't No Mountain High Enough". It was their only Cash Box Top 100 number-one hit.

== Song information ==
The song's lyrics, filled with colorful, dream-like imagery, lead some to believe that it is about drugs. According to the drug theory, the "flying spoon" was a reference to a cocaine or heroin spoon, and the crazy animal images were an acid trip. Fogerty, however, has stated in interviews that the song was actually written for his then three-year-old son, Josh. Fogerty has also said that the allusion to a parade passing by was inspired by the Dr. Seuss book And to Think That I Saw It on Mulberry Street.

The song begins and ends with the mention of Illinois, and locking the front door to prevent his troubles from following him home. Country singer Buck Owens is also mentioned in the song; country singer Buddy Alan, the son of Buck Owens, recorded a cover version of the song in 1971.

Reviewing the song, Cash Box stated "emphasing their early-rock gut appeal, CCR plunges into a rough-hewn bit of dance material that should sparkle." Record World called it a "super-smash." Billboard called it a "clever rhythm item."

== Covers ==
Jody Miller covered the song on her album Look at Mine.

The song was covered by the Finnish melodic death metal band Children of Bodom on their album Blooddrunk as a bonus track on the U.K. release.

== Personnel ==
- John Fogerty – lead vocals, lead guitar
- Tom Fogerty – rhythm guitar
- Stu Cook – bass guitar, keyboards
- Doug Clifford – drums, percussion

== Charts ==
=== Weekly charts ===
Chart (1970)	Peak position
Australia Go-Set	1
Austria Ö3 Top 40	1
Belgian Ultratop 50	4
Canadian RPM Top Tracks	1
Finland	16
German Media Control Charts	2
New Zealand (Listener)	4
Norwegian VG-Lista Charts	1
South Africa (Springbok)	2
Sweden (Tio i Topp)	1
US Billboard Hot 100	2
US Cash Box Top 100	1
US Record World Singles	1

=== Year-end charts ===
Chart (1970)	Rank
Australia	6
Canada	4
US Billboard Hot 100	36

== Certifications ==
Certifications for "Lookin' out My Back Door"
Region	Certification	Certified units/sales
New Zealand (RMNZ)	Platinum	30,000^{‡}
United States (RIAA)	2× Platinum	2,000,000^{‡}
^{‡} Sales+streaming figures based on certification alone.

== See also ==
- List of Cash Box Top 100 number-one singles of 1970
