= Travelin' Band: Creedence Clearwater Revival at the Royal Albert Hall =

2022 documentary film

- Directed by: Bob Smeaton
- Produced by: John Beug; Jonathan Clyde; Sophia Dilley; Michael Schatz; Sig Sigworth; Martin R. Smith
- Starring: Doug Clifford; Stu Cook; John Fogerty; Tom Fogerty; Jeff Bridges (narrator)
- Music by: Creedence Clearwater Revival
- Distributed by: Netflix
- Release date: September 16, 2022
- Running time: 86 minutes
- Country: United States
- Language: English

Travelin' Band: Creedence Clearwater Revival at the Royal Albert Hall is a 2022 documentary film directed by Bob Smeaton. The film documents the origins of the American swamp rock band Creedence Clearwater Revival and their 1970 European tour, culminating in an April 14, 1970 performance at London's Royal Albert Hall. The movie takes its name from the band's song "Travelin' Band".

A 40-minute history narrated by actor Jeff Bridges documents the band's formation in El Cerrito, California, their early efforts under as Tommy Fogerty & the Blue Velvets and The Golliwogs, and their signing by Fantasy Records. At the time they toured Europe, the Beatles broke up, leaving Creedence as, as Bridges puts it, "the biggest group in the world."

After the history section, the entire 42-minute Royal Albert Hall concert is presented. The footage had not been seen prior to the release of the film on Netflix. It is the only concert footage of the original Creedence lineup to be released in its entirety.

The film's release was accompanied by an album of the concert called At the Royal Albert Hall.

== Concert setlist ==
All songs written by John Fogerty, except where noted

1. "Born on the Bayou" – 5:12^{1}
2. "Green River" – 2:57
3. "Tombstone Shadow" – 3:39
4. "Travelin' Band" – 2:11 – 5:12^{1}
5. "Fortunate Son" – 2:16
6. "Commotion" – 2:45
7. "Midnight Special" (traditional, arranged by John Fogerty) – 3:38
8. "Bad Moon Rising" – 2:19
9. "Proud Mary" – 3:01
10. "The Night Time Is the Right Time" (Lew Herman) – 3:11
11. "Good Golly, Miss Molly" (Robert Blackwell and John Marascalco) – 2:51
12. "Keep On Chooglin'" – 8:37

^{1} April 14th started with "Travelin' Band".
