= At the Royal Albert Hall =

Live album by Creedence Clearwater Revival
- Released: September 16, 2022
- Recorded: April 14, 1970
- Venue: Royal Albert Hall in Kensington and Chelsea, London, England, United Kingdom
- Genre: Swamp rock
- Length: 42:36
- Label: Craft; Fantasy

Creedence Clearwater Revival chronology
Live at Woodstock (2019)	At the Royal Albert Hall (2022)

At the Royal Albert Hall is a 2022 live album recorded in 1970 with American swamp rock band Creedence Clearwater Revival. The performance was released as an album to coincide with the documentary film Travelin’ Band: Creedence Clearwater Revival at the Royal Albert Hall, directed by Bob Smeaton. The recordings document the band's first European tour and feature footage that has never been released; the album includes the entire set recorded on April 14, 1970. An earlier live album, The Concert, released in 1980, was initially erroneously titled The Royal Albert Hall Concert, but actually documented a completely different CCR show in Oakland, California, three months before their UK tour.

== Reception ==
Writing for Variety, Jem Aswad praises both the album and documentary for capturing the band at their peak. John Aizlewood of Classic Rock rates the album four out of five, highlighting all of the individual member's contributions to the band, as well as the "pristine listening experience" due to the technical personnel preparing the recordings for listening. AllMusic's Fred Thomas gave a positive review pointing out the upbeat performances that are "flawlessly executed and crackling with energy".

== Track listing ==
All songs written by John Fogerty, except where noted

1. "Born on the Bayou" – 5:12
2. "Green River" – 2:57
3. "Tombstone Shadow" – 3:39
4. "Travelin' Band" – 2:11
5. "Fortunate Son" – 2:16
6. "Commotion" – 2:45
7. "Midnight Special" (traditional, arranged by John Fogerty) – 3:38
8. "Bad Moon Rising" – 2:19
9. "Proud Mary" – 3:01
10. "The Night Time Is the Right Time" (Lew Herman) – 3:11
11. "Good Golly, Miss Molly" (Robert Blackwell and John Marascalco) – 2:51
12. "Keep On Chooglin'" – 8:37

The Super Deluxe Edition from Craft Recordings also included a second disc that acts as a soundtrack to the film with songs recorded by the band, including in earlier incarnations under different names:

1. "Come On Baby" (by Tommy Fogerty and The Blue Velvets) – 2:13
2. "Brown Eyed Girl" (by The Golliwogs) – 2:31
3. "Porterville" (by The Golliwogs) – 2:17
4. "Suzie Q." (Eleanor Broadwater, Robert Chaisson, Dale Hawkins, and Stan Lewis) – 4:20
5. "I Put a Spell on You" (Screamin' Jay Hawkins) – 4:32
6. "Proud Mary" – 3:07
7. "Born on the Bayou" – 5:15
8. "Bad Moon Rising" – 2:19
9. "Green River" – 2:34
10. "The Night Time Is the Right Time" (Lew Herman) – 3:07
11. "Down on the Corner" – 2:46
12. "Who'll Stop the Rain" – 2:27

== Personnel ==
Creedence Clearwater Revival

- Doug Clifford – drums
- Stu Cook – bass guitar, backing vocals
- John Fogerty – vocals, guitar, harmonica
- Tom Fogerty – rhythm guitar, backing vocals

Technical personnel

- Giles Martin – mixing, restoration
- Sam Okell – mixing, restoration
- Miles Showell – mastering at Abbey Road Studios

== Charts ==
Chart performance for At the Royal Albert Hall
Chart (2022)	Peak position
Australian Albums (ARIA)	73
Belgian Albums (Ultratop Flanders)	19
Belgian Albums (Ultratop Wallonia)	54
Dutch Albums (Album Top 100)	28
German Albums (Offizielle Top 100)	23
Spanish Albums (Promusicae)	54
Swiss Albums (Schweizer Hitparade)	23
US Billboard 200	192
US Independent Albums (Billboard)	29

== See also ==
- Lists of 2022 albums
