= Deal It Out =

Studio album by Tom Fogerty
- Released: 1981
- Label: Fantasy Records
- Producers: David Hayes, Mark Springer, Tom Fogerty

Tom Fogerty chronology
| Myopia (1974) | Deal It Out (1981) | Precious Gems (1984) |

Professional ratings
Review scores
| Source | Rating |
|---|---|
| Allmusic | 2/5 stars |

Deal It Out is Tom Fogerty's fifth and final solo album, though he would release one album, Precious Gems, as "Tom Fogerty + Ruby" and record an album with Randy Oda, Sidekicks, that was released posthumously.

== Track listing ==
All songs written by Tom Fogerty, except where noted.

1. "Champagne Love" – 2:47 (Doug Clifford, Tom Fogerty)
2. "Why Me" – 5:39
3. "Real Real Gone" – 4:06 (Van Morrison)
4. "Tricia Suzanne" – 2:55
5. "Mystery Train" – 2:31 (Junior Parker, Sam Phillips)
6. "Deal It Out" – 3:13 (Hans Olson)
7. "Open the Windows" – 3:17 (Kim Park)
8. "You Move Me" – 4:25 (Van Morrison)
9. "The Secret" – 2:26
10. "Summer Night" – 4:08 (Kim Park)

== Personnel ==
- Tom Fogerty – guitar, harmonica, vocals
- Bill Swartz – guitar
- John Blakeley – guitar
- Greg Douglass – guitar
- John Allair – keyboards
- Mark Isham – keyboards
- Marc Russo – keyboards
- Pee Wee Ellis – saxophone
- Tom Lilienthal – bass
- David Hayes – bass
- Scott Morris – drums
- Jeff Myer – drums
