= The Very Best of Tom Fogerty =

Compilation album by Tom Fogerty
- Released: July 27, 1999
- Genre: Rock
- Length: 61:28
- Label: Varèse Sarabande

Professional ratings
Review scores
| Source | Rating |
|---|---|
| AllMusic | 4.5/5 stars |

The Very Best of Tom Fogerty is a compilation of various material from rock musician Tom Fogerty's solo career. It was released July 27, 1999 on the Varèse Sarabande label.

== Track listing ==
All songs written by Tom Fogerty, except where noted.

1. "Goodbye Media Man" – 6:09
2. "The Legend of Alcatraz" – 2:36
3. "Lady of Fatima" – 4:36
4. "Beauty Is Under The Skin" – 2:28
5. "Everyman" – 2:16
6. "Rocky Road Blues" (Bill Monroe) – 3:52
7. "(Hold On) Annie Mae" – 3:50
8. "Joyful Resurrection" – 3:33
9. "Give Me Another Trojan Song" – 3:01
10. "What Did I Know" – 2:36
11. "Sweet Things To Come" – 2:14
12. "And I Love You" – 2:23
13. "Champagne Love" (Doug Clifford, Tom Fogerty) – 2:52
14. "Tricia Suzanne" – 2:57
15. "Mystery Train" (Junior Parker, Sam Phillips) – 3:23
16. "Deal It Out" (Hans Olson) – 3:14
17. "Sometimes" – 4:45
18. "Sloop John B" (traditional) – 4:43
