= Crowfoot (band) =

American rock band

- Genres: Rock
- Years active: 1964–1968 (as the Beau Gentry) 1968–1971, 1994
- Labels: Paramount, ABC/Dunhill Records, Aerial View
- Past members: Russell DaShiell; Doug Killmer; Rick Jaeger; Don Francisco; Sam McCue; Bill Sutton

Crowfoot was an American rock band, initially known as The Beau Gentry. The original line-up featured Russell DaShiell, Doug Killmer and Rick Jaeger.

== History ==
Crowfoot was an American band initially featuring Russell DaShiell on guitar and vocals, Doug Killmer on bass and vocals, and Rick Jaeger on drums. The group originally formed in 1964 under the name The Beau Gentry as an Indialantic, Florida-based high-school cover band. Eventually DaShiell began to write music and the band began to perform their own material. At that time the band also featured Lance Massey on guitar and vocals. They were discovered by manager Ken Adamany who arranged a successful 1966 tour through the US mid-west. On the strength of this tour, the band decided to relocate to the area and build upon the fan base they had established. In December 1968, DaShiell, Killmer and Jaeger decided to relocate again, this time to the San Francisco Bay area in the hopes that exposure in the burgeoning Bay area music scene would lead them to a recording contract. Lance Massey chose to settle in Wisconsin. The remaining band members formed a trio and renamed themselves Crowfoot, performing all-original material.

In California, DaShiell, Killmer and Jaeger found session work to help make ends meet. Of particular note was DaShiell's and Killmer's work on Norman Greenbaum's million-selling hit, "Spirit in the Sky", and DaShiell's and Jaeger's work with former Canned Heat guitarist, Harvey Mandel. In 1970 Crowfoot signed with Paramount, but by this time Killmer was pursuing other projects and although Jaeger played drums on the self-titled album, Crowfoot had essentially become a solo act, with DaShiell writing, arranging, and playing both guitar and bass on the album. To support the album's release Ken Adamany set up a mid-west tour for Crowfoot, culminating with a showcase at the Bitter End in New York. Guitarist Sam McCue, formerly with the Everly Brothers and Milwaukee band The Legends, joined the band for the tour along with bass player Bill Sutton, with Rick Jaeger returning on drums.

In 1971, Crowfoot recorded a second album, Find the Sun, which was picked up by ABC/Dunhill Records. It featured DaShiell on guitar and vocals, Don Francisco on drums and vocals, and Sam McCue on guitar and vocals. Bill Sutton played bass on the sessions. The album brought comparisons with Bread and Poco. "Travel In Time" was released as a single from the album, featuring McCue on lead vocal, but with disappointing album sales the band ultimately decided to dissolve.

Years later, in 1994, the original Crowfoot trio of DaShiell, Killmer and Jaeger reunited to record an EP, titled Mesenger. It was released regionally on DaShiell's Aerial View label.

After leaving Crowfoot, Jaeger became the regular drummer for Dave Mason and he recorded with Tim Weisberg, the Pointer Sisters and the BoDeans amongst others. He also spent time in the early 1980s as the drummer for Mike Finnigan and The Right Band. Rick Jaeger died in 2000. Doug Killmer played on the Otis Rush Grammy-nominated song from 1976 "Right Place, Wrong Time", and Rita Abrams' Grammy Award-winning song, "Mill Valley". He was active in the San Francisco Bay Area music scene for over three decades until his death in 2005. Sam McCue lives and performs in the Milwaukee, Wisconsin area. Don Francisco went on to play with Linda Ronstadt, Kim Carnes and the California rock band Wha-Koo. He died in 1998. Russell DaShiell relocated to the Los Angeles area and worked with musicians Phil Everly, Bo Diddley, John Sebastian and former Creedence Clearwater Revival member Tom Fogerty. He was a member of the Don Harrison Band from 1976 to 1977 which featured Stu Cook and Doug Clifford, also former members of Creedence Clearwater Revival. He continues to work and record in the Los Angeles area.

== Discography ==
=== Albums ===
Year	Title	Label	Catalogue number
1970	Crowfoot	Paramount Records	Paramount PAS-5016
1971	Find the Sun	ABC/Dunhill Records	ABCS 745

=== EPs ===
- Mesenger (1994), Aerial View

=== Singles ===
- "California Rock'n'Roll", Paramount
- "Groove Along"/"Love Is Everywhere", Paramount (promotional only)
- "Travel In Time", ABC/Dunhill Records

== Members ==
- Russell DaShiell - guitar, vocals
- Doug Killmer - bass guitar, vocals
- Rick Jaeger - drums
- Don Francisco - drums, vocals
- Sam McCue - guitar, vocals
- Bill Sutton - bass guitar
