= Cosmo (Doug Clifford album) =

Studio album by Doug Clifford
- Released: September 1972
- Genre: Country rock; blue-eyed soul
- Length: 27:23
- Language: English
- Label: Fantasy
- Producer: Doug Clifford

Professional ratings
Review scores
| Source | Rating |
|---|---|
| Allmusic | 2.5/5 stars |

Cosmo is the first solo studio album by former Creedence Clearwater Revival drummer Doug Clifford, released shortly after that band's breakup.

== Background ==
In a 2012 interview, Clifford was critical of the album:

"It's not in print, and I don't see any reason why... why it would even be relevant. When Revival broke up, we all ended up having individual contracts, so I decided to make a record and see what it was like. Secondly, we had the Cosmo's Factory building under a long-term lease, and Stu [Cook, of Creedence Clearwater Revival and Revisited] has plans... the remote recording vehicle starting to appear in that time period, they had one in L.A. that I used for that record. We thought we could back it into the building, which was an old warehouse, and run a snake that would allow us to hook up microphones inside our own rehearsal area and use it as a recording studio. We each had bands we wanted to record and try and get record deals for, and make money that way, and also give us capital and use that machine because there were none in the San Francisco Bay Area. So that's it... I think it's a terrible record. The band is good. The band is great. I had really good players on that record but I... obviously I'm not a singer. So that's not something I'm interested in."

On June 22, 2018, the album was reissued by Craft Recordings (along with fellow Creedence alumnus Tom Fogerty's second solo album, Excalibur). In an interview with Forbes, Clifford described the recording process as a positive experience: “Making this record was a blast because it was a superstar line-up,” Clifford said, “It was a collaboration to a large degree. I told everyone that I was open to any ideas they might have. That got everybody involved in the process. The camaraderie was great, there was no pressure and that got the best performances from everyone. We cut everything live, so when the horns were playing we were a 10-piece band!”

== Track listing ==
All songs written by Doug Clifford, except where noted

1. "Latin Music" – 3:11
2. "Regret It (For the Rest of Your Life)" – 2:23
3. "Guitars, Drums, and Girls" – 2:07
4. "I'm a Man" (Jimmy Miller, Steve Winwood) – 2:25
5. "She's About a Mover" (Doug Sahm) – 2:27
6. "I Just Want to Cry" – 2:48
7. "Get Your Raise" – 2:31
8. "Daydream" (John Sebastian) – 2:10
9. "Take a Train" – 2:06
10. "Death Machine" – 2:23
11. "Swingin' in a Hammock" – 2:52

== Personnel ==
- Doug Clifford – lead vocals, drums, arrangements

Additional musicians

- Stu Cook – lead and rhythm guitar
- Donald Dunn – bass guitar
- Steve Miller – piano
- Greg Adams – trumpet
- Mic Gillette – trombone, trumpet
- Emilio Castillo – tenor saxophone
- Skip Mesquite – tenor saxophone
- Stephen Kupka – baritone saxophone
- Eddie Bayers – vocals
- Lynette Hawkins – vocals
- Freddie Smith – vocals
- Judiyaba – cello

Additional personnel

- Bob Fogerty – photography
- Russ Gary – engineer
- Tony Lane – art direction
