= Think I'm in Love (Eddie Money song) =

Single by Eddie Money

from the album No Control
- B-side: "Drivin' Me Crazy"
- Released: June 1982
- Genre: Hard rock
- Length: 3:09
- Label: Columbia
- Songwriters: Eddie Money, Randy Oda
- Producer: Tom Dowd

Eddie Money singles chronology
"Running Back" (1980)	"Think I'm in Love" (1982)	"Shakin'" (1982)

Music video
- "Think I'm in Love" on YouTube

"Think I'm in Love" is a 1982 hit single by American rock singer Eddie Money from his album No Control. The song was written by Money and Randy Oda (who is perhaps best known otherwise for his collaborations with former Creedence Clearwater Revival member Tom Fogerty and their band, Ruby). The song was released as a single and reached #16 on the Billboard Hot 100 and hit #1 on the Billboard Top Tracks chart.

The song was Money's first Top 40 hit in several years, and sparked a brief comeback for the artist. The song remains a popular track, and gets frequent airplay on classic rock radio stations.

== Music video ==
The music video included elements from classic vampire movies (with Eddie Money cast as a quasi-Dracula character). It was one of the most popular early MTV music videos.

== In popular culture ==
The song has been featured in several movies, including Joe Dirt and Paul Blart: Mall Cop, the miniseries Waco and the fourth series opener of Cuckoo.

== Chart history ==
=== Weekly charts ===
Chart (1982)	Peak position
U.S. Billboard Hot 100	16
U.S. Billboard Top Rock Tracks	1
Canada RPM Top Singles	11
U.S. Cash Box Top 100	21

=== Year-end charts ===
Chart (1982)	Rank
US Top Pop Singles (Billboard)	58
U.S. Billboard Top Rock Tracks	37

== See also ==
- List of Billboard Mainstream Rock number-one songs of the 1980s
