= The Day Reagan Was Shot =

2001 American television film

- Promotional poster
- Written by: Cyrus Nowrasteh
- Directed by: Cyrus Nowrasteh
- Starring: Richard Dreyfuss; Richard Crenna; Colm Feore; Michael Murphy; Holland Taylor
- Music by: Elizabeth Myers; John Trivers
- Country of origin: United States
- Original language: English

Production
- Executive producers: Dan Halsted; Oliver Stone
- Producer: Armand Leo
- Cinematography: Michael McMurray
- Editor: Paul Seydor
- Running time: 98 minutes
- Production companies: Paramount Television; Showtime Networks

Original release
- Network: Showtime
- Release: December 9, 2001

The Day Reagan Was Shot is a 2001 American made-for-television film drama film directed by Cyrus Nowrasteh and co-produced by Oliver Stone. The film stars Richard Dreyfuss as Alexander Haig and Richard Crenna as Ronald Reagan, and co-stars Michael Murphy, Holland Taylor, Kenneth Welsh and Colm Feore. The film premiered on Showtime on December 9, 2001.

== Plot ==
The film is loosely based on events surrounding the Reagan assassination attempt on March 30, 1981 by John Hinckley Jr., and depicts a media frenzy, a divided White House cabinet and staff with little control, and a fictional threat of international crisis.

== Cast ==
- Richard Dreyfuss as Alexander Haig
- Richard Crenna as Ronald Reagan
- Colm Feore as Caspar Weinberger
- Michael Murphy as Michael Deaver
- Holland Taylor as Nancy Reagan
- Kenneth Welsh as James Baker
- Leon Pownall as Ed Meese
- Robert Bockstael as Richard V. Allen
- Beau Starr as Special Agent Cage
- Alex Carter as Dr. Allard
- Andrew Tarbet as Dr. Gregorio
- Christian Lloyd as John Hinckley Jr.
- Sean McCann as Donald Regan
- Jack Jessop as William J. Casey
- John Connolly as James Brady
- Angela Gei as Sarah Brady
- Michael Greene as George Bush
- Yannick Bisson as Buddy Stein
- Frank Moore as Lt. Col. Taylor
- Ken James as Chairman of the Joint Chiefs of Staff, General Yates (Based on David C. Jones)
- Oliver Dennis as David Gergen
- Bernard Behrens as William F. Smith
- Tiffanie Bell as Nurse Sally
- Wayne Best as FBI Agent Kirkus
- Christopher Bondy as White House Reporter
- Brendan Connor as White House Reporter
- Neil Crone as Lyn Nofziger
- James Downing as Bagman
- Dan Duran as Network Anchor
- Greg Ellwand as Night Time News Host

== Awards and nominations ==
American Cinema Editors

- Won: Best Edited Motion Picture for Non-Commercial Television (Paul Seydor)

Satellite Awards

- Won: Best Actor – Miniseries or Television Film (Richard Dreyfuss)
- Won: Best Television Film

Screen Actors Guild Award

- Nominated: Outstanding Performance by a Male Actor in a Miniseries or Television Movie (Richard Dreyfuss)
