= The Don Harrison Band =

American rock band

- Genre: Rock
- Years active: 1976–1977
- Label: Atlantic
- Spinoff of: Creedence Clearwater Revival
- Past members: Don Harrison; Stu Cook; Doug Clifford; Russell DaShiell; John Tanner

The Don Harrison Band were a 1970s American roots rock band that featured Don Harrison on vocals, guitar and keyboards, Stu Cook on bass and piano and Doug Clifford on drums and percussion. Stu Cook and Doug "Cosmo" Clifford were both former members of Creedence Clearwater Revival. The line-up also included Russell DaShiell formerly of Crowfoot on lead and rhythm guitar, piano and vocals. The band merged elements of folk, country, rhythm & blues and rock & roll in a sound reminiscent of CCR.

== History ==
Don Harrison was born c.1944 and grew up in an integrated Louisville, Kentucky, neighborhood. He first performed as a singer in an otherwise all-black a cappella group. He relocated to Los Angeles in 1962 where he performed in bars and as a studio musician. After Creedence split up, Cook and Clifford had set up a studio in a converted warehouse known as The Factory. Originally DaShiell, Cook and Clifford intended to produce Harrison, but they then decided to launch the band together with him instead. They were signed by Atlantic Records, and debuted with a cover version of Tennessee Ernie Ford's 1955 hit "Sixteen Tons", which featured Hugh Cregg (later better known as Huey Lewis) on harmonica.

They released two albums on Atlantic: The Don Harrison Band (Atlantic SD-18171) in April 1976, which featured the Memphis Horns, and Red Hot (Wounded Bird Records - WOBR 1820) in January 1977. The band's debut album peaked at number 159 on the Billboard 200, and received a positive critical response. They also made the charts with "Sixteen Tons", which peaked at number 47 on the Billboard Hot 100. Red Hot, which saw the addition of keyboard player John Tanner, also received positive reviews but was less commercially successful. During the band's heyday, Don Harrison resided in Bell Gardens, California leading a modest lifestyle in a lower-middle-class neighborhood, where he converted a multiplex into a modest looking single family home.

A highlight for the band was performing as opening act at the 1976 Knebworth Festival headlined by the Rolling Stones.

After the breakup, Harrison recorded a solo album (Not Far From Free) and then seemingly disappeared from the music scene. DaShiell recorded a solo album Elevator (with Cook and Clifford on bass and drums) and signed with Epic Records. As of 2012, Harrison continued to work and record in the Los Angeles area. Cook later played in Southern Pacific. Also as of 2012, the ex-CCR members, Cook and Clifford, were back on tour performing with their band, Creedence Clearwater Revisited. Don Harrison now lives in Utah with his wife and family. Don Harrison passed away in Kanab Utah on February 17th 2026.

== Discography ==
=== Albums ===
- The Don Harrison Band (1976), Atlantic
- Red Hot (1977), Atlantic

Don Harrison solo

- Not Far From Free (1977), Mercury

=== Singles ===
- "Sixteen Tons" (1976), Atlantic. Peaked at #47 on the Billboard Hot 100, #75 on the Cashbox Top 100 and #53 in Australia.
- "Rock 'N' Roll Records" (1976), Atlantic

Don Harrison solo

- "Helter Skelter"/"Funky Monkey" (1977), Mercury - promotional only 12-inch single
