= Precious Gems =

Compilation album by Tom Fogerty + Ruby
- Released: 1984
- Studio: Fantasy Records
- Genre: Rock
- Label: Fantasy

Tom Fogerty + Ruby chronology
Deal It Out (1981)	Precious Gems (1984)	Sidekicks (1992)

Professional ratings
Review scores
Source	Rating
AllMusic	2/5 stars

Precious Gems is a compilation album by the band Ruby, containing tracks from their two studio albums – Ruby (1977) and Rock & Roll Madness (1978).

== Track listing ==
1. "Running Back to Me" (Fogerty, Oda)
2. "Life Is But a Dream" (Fogerty)
3. "Mistreater" (Oda)
4. "Run With Your Love" (Oda)
5. "Bart" [instrumental] (Oda)
6. "Take Me Back to London" (Fogerty, Oda)
7. "Can You Really Say" (Davis)
8. "Singin' the Blues" (McCreary)
9. "Dance All Night" (Davis)

== Personnel ==
- Tom Fogerty – guitar, harmonica, vocals
- Randy Oda – guitar, keyboards, vocals
- Anthony Davis – bass, vocals
- Bobby Cochran – drums, percussion, vocals
- Jamie Putnam – cover art design
- Phil Carroll – art direction
