= Myopia (Tom Fogerty album) =

Studio album by Tom Fogerty
- Released: November 1974
- Genre: Rock
- Label: Fantasy

Tom Fogerty chronology
Zephyr National (1974)	Myopia (1974)	Deal It Out (1981)

Myopia is Tom Fogerty's fourth solo album. It was released by Fantasy Records in 1974.

== Track listing ==
All songs written by Tom Fogerty.

1. "Give Me Another Trojan Song" – 2:59
2. "What Did I Know" – 2:35
3. "Theme from Four-D" – 3:11
4. "Sweet Things to Come" – 2:11
5. "What About Tomorrow" – 4:23
6. "She La La La" – 3:01
7. "And I Love You" – 2:23
8. "Get Up" – 2:07
9. "There Was a Time" – 3:09
10. "Show Down" – 2:35

== Personnel ==
- Doug Clifford – percussion, drums
- Stu Cook – bass
- Russell DaShiell – guitar
- Tom Fogerty – guitar, vocals
- Russ Gary – guitar, vocals
- Stephen Miller – keyboards
- Tom Phillips – guitar
- Stovall Sisters – vocals
