= A.B. Skhy =

American blues band

- Also known as: New Blues
- Origin: Milwaukee, Wisconsin, United States
- Genres: Electric blues, psychedelic rock, acid rock
- Years active: 1968–Early 1970s
- Labels: MGM
- Past members: Terry Anderson; Dennis Geyer; Jim Marcotte; Howard Wales; James "Curley" Cooke; Rick Jaeger

A.B. Skhy (originally New Blues) was an American electric blues band from Milwaukee formed in 1968. They recorded two albums before splitting up in the early 1970s.

== History ==
Formed in Milwaukee in the late 1960s as New Blues, the band comprised Dennis Geyer (guitar, vocals), Jim Marcotte (bass guitar), Terry Anderson (drums), and Howard Wales (keyboards). Wales had previously played with artists such as James Brown and Freddie King. Wales also played with the Grateful Dead on their American Beauty album. They relocated to San Francisco and changed the band name to A.B. Skhy, building a following with live performances. They were signed by MGM Records and worked with producer Richard Delvy on their self-titled debut album, released in 1969. The album featured contributions from guitarist Russell DaShiell, harmonica player Jim Liban, and flautist Otis Hale and spawned the single "Camel Back", which reached number 100 on the Billboard Hot 100.

The group then split, with Andersen and Wales leaving, the latter going on to play with Harvey Mandel, Jerry Garcia, and The Grateful Dead. Geyer and Marcotte recruited drummer Rick Jaeger and guitarist James "Curley" Cooke (formerly of The Versitones and The Steve Miller Band), and the new lineup recorded a second album, Ramblin' On, in March 1970 with Kim Fowley and Michael Lloyd producing. The album included a mixture of cover versions and original songs by Cooke.

A third album was started but the band split up before it was completed. Cooke went on to play in Cat and the Fiddle and with Boz Scaggs and Ben Sidran (who had played harpsichord on Ramblin' On), and released the solo album Gingerman in 1980. Jaeger joined DaShiell in Crowfoot and recorded with several artists as a session player.

== Discography ==
=== Albums ===
- A.B. Skhy (1969), MGM
- Ramblin' On (1970), MGM

Compilations

- A.B. Skhy featuring Howard Wales (1994), One Way
- Clear Blue Sky (2010), K-Tel

In 2016 Shady Grove released a 3-CD various artists 'live' album featuring A.B. Skhy along with the Grateful Dead, Joy of Cooking, Sal Valentino, Ron Elliot and Lydia Philips, Congress of Wonders, It's A Beautiful Day, and Quicksilver Messenger Service. The album, containing all previously unreleased live recordings, was called Curiosities From The San Francisco Underground, Volume One.

=== Singles ===
- "Camel Back" / "Just What I Need" (1969), MGM - U.S. No. 100
