= Russell DaShiell =

American musician

- Born: July 23, 1947 (age 77); Philadelphia, United States
- Origin: Hawaii, Florida, California
- Genres: Pop, rock
- Occupation(s): Musician, composer, producer
- Instrument(s): Guitar, bass, keyboards
- Years active: 1963–present
- Labels: Paramount, ABC Dunhill, Epic, Sonet, Aerial View
- Website: www.spiritguitar.com

Russell DaShiell (born July 23, 1947) is an American guitarist who has recorded as a solo artist as well as playing in bands such as Crowfoot and the Don Harrison Band, and with Harvey Mandel, Phil Everly and Norman Greenbaum. Russell was also one of the first people to have a Les Paul humbucker bridge pickup in a strat in 1970.

== Career ==
Born in Philadelphia, DaShiell lived on Oahu, Hawaii between the ages of three and fifteen, taking up guitar at the age of fourteen. He moved with his parents to Florida in 1963, where he formed a band that played cover songs in the local beach clubs. He then joined Doug Killmer's band The Sonics, which after the addition of drummer Rick Jaeger became The Beau Gentry in 1965. The Beau Gentry spent the next year in Florida developing a following, and in 1966 they were booked for a summer tour of Wisconsin by Ken Adamany (who would later manage Cheap Trick). The tour went so well they decided to stay in the area. After two years of gigging in the midwest, the band evolved into Crowfoot and relocated to San Francisco in December, 1968.

With Crowfoot struggling to make ends meet, DaShiell began working as a session guitarist in the S.F. Bay area, playing on A.B. Skhy's 1969 debut album, and going on to play in Harvey Mandel's band with Rick Jaeger. He also played on Norman Greenbaum's Spirit in the Sky album, with Doug Killmer on bass, which included the chart-topping title track. He then toured with Greenbaum and played on his next two albums. His success prompted him to revive Crowfoot, securing a record deal with Paramount Records, although the band's self-titled 1970 album was largely a DaShiell solo effort, as was its 1971 follow-up Find the Sun on ABC Dunhill.

DaShiell relocated to Hollywood in the early 1970s and continued his session work, recording with artists such as Phil Everly, Danny O'Keefe, Bo Diddley, John Sebastian, and former Creedence Clearwater Revival member Tom Fogerty, recording his album Myopia with Stu Cook and Doug Clifford, also former Creedence members. He went on to work with Cook and Clifford on solo material and joined them in the Don Harrison Band, recording two albums for Atlantic Records in 1976 and opening for the Rolling Stones at Knebworth that year.

DaShiell finally released solo material after signing with Epic Records. The Elevator album, featuring his collaborations with Cook and Clifford, was released in 1978.

Although his solo career was initially short-lived, he continued to work on various projects, including a single and album with new band 'I Spy' in the 1980s with Doug Clifford on drums, signing with Sonet in Sweden. He also worked on a solo album by Doug Clifford. By the end of the 1980s he had moved into television soundtrack and editing work, notably on In Living Color.

In the early 1990s he and his former Crowfoot bandmates Doug Killmer and Rick Jaeger were reunited to record the EP Mesenger in 1994. In the late 1990s DaShiell moved to Lake Tahoe and composed for advertising while continuing to record solo material. In 2000 he moved to Maui, writing and recording the album Island Life, which he is currently updating for a 2024 release via his website spiritguitar.com. He’s also been developing a project called Foreverland Forest, initially intended as a children’s book with music, expanded to be an animated film featuring 10 original songs from his upcoming solo album Foreverland.

== Discography ==
=== Albums ===
- Crowfoot (1970), Paramount
- Find the Sun (1971), ABC Dunhill
- Elevator (1978), Epic
- Island Life (2024), Aerial View
- Foreverland (2024), Aerial View

=== Singles, EPs ===
- In the Fire (1978), Epic
- Fool For Your Love (1984), Sonet
- Mesenger (1994), Aerial View
