= Creedence Clearwater Revisited =

American rock band

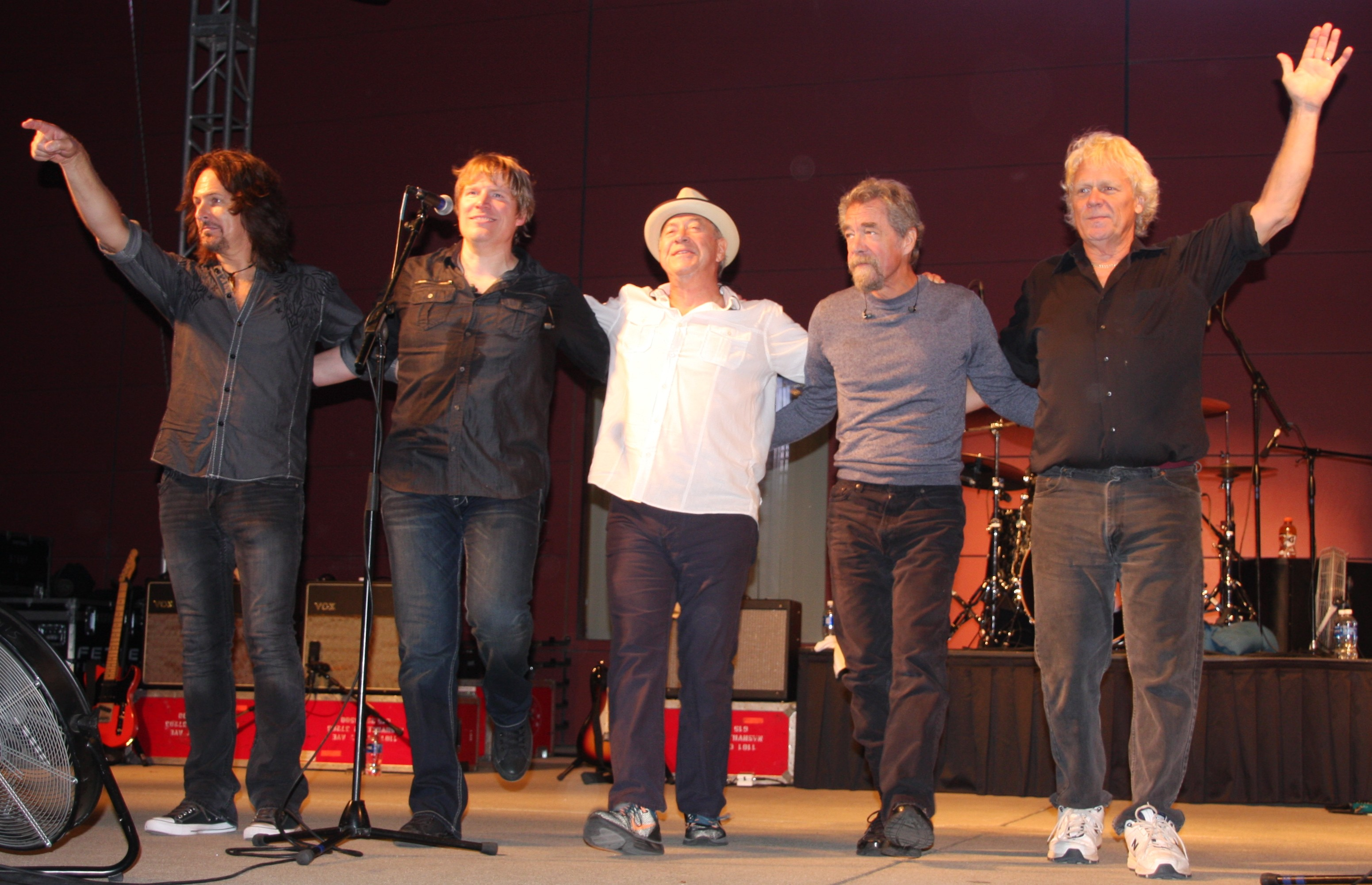
- Creedence Clearwater Revisited in 2016

Background information
- Origin: United States
- Genres: Roots rock; Swamp rock
- Years active: 1995–2020
- Label: Fuel 2000
- Spinoff of: Creedence Clearwater Revival
- Past members: Doug Clifford; Stu Cook; Steve Gunner; Kurt Griffey; Dan McGuinness; Elliot Easton; John Tristao; Tal Morris; Ron Wikso
- Website: creedence-revisited.com

Creedence Clearwater Revisited was an American rock band formed in 1995 by bassist Stu Cook and drummer Doug "Cosmo" Clifford, former members of Creedence Clearwater Revival, to play live versions of that band's music.

== Overview ==
Much of Creedence Clearwater Revival's music had been written and arranged by John Fogerty, who has not participated in Creedence Clearwater Revisited. Fogerty had exercised artistic control over the earlier band, and he sued to try to stop the newer "Revisited" band from using its similar name, saying the name would confuse the public into thinking it was a continuation of the earlier "Revival" band. However, his lawsuit was ultimately unsuccessful. The fourth member of Creedence Clearwater Revival, Tom Fogerty, had died in 1990 before the new band was formed.

== History ==
The band was formed in 1995. Stu Cook bought a house in Lake Tahoe near Doug Clifford's home and the two began regularly jamming and decided to form a band, despite Clifford considering himself retired at the time. Cook said "We never really had any intention of playing for the public, but a friend wanted to promote a couple of concerts. We got talked into it, but didn't know how it would go over." The duo contacted John Fogerty "out of courtesy" to invite him to reunite with them but Fogerty, who at the time was refusing to play Creedence music, declined the offer.

In 1996, the group increased the scope of their reunion, playing 190 shows over the course of the year before slowing to 100 and settling on 75 annual performances for around 15 years at the behest of Clifford. As the group passed their 20th anniversary, their annual touring dates were reduced to around 50. The band has toured North America, South America, Australia, New Zealand, Europe and Asia.

In 1997, John Fogerty sued Creedence Clearwater Revisited, saying that the band name confused the American public and led them to believe that John Fogerty was a part of the new band. The court agreed, and an injunction prevented the new band from using the name Creedence Clearwater Revisited any longer. The band changed its name to Cosmo's Factory, a name it had earlier considered and the name of the original band's 1970 album. The band appealed the ruling, and the U.S. Ninth Court of Appeals overturned the injunction, stating that there was no evidence that people were confused and led to believe that Fogerty was associated with the new band. The band immediately changed its name back to Creedence Clearwater Revisited.

In 1998, the band released Recollection, an album composed of live versions of Creedence Clearwater Revival songs. Recollection was certified Platinum by the RIAA in 2007.

In September 2017, Clifford ruled out any chance of Cook and himself reuniting with Fogerty, stating "It would have been great 20, 25 years ago. It's way too late now."

In April 2019, Clifford and Cook said they would disband Creedence Clearwater Revisited and retire from touring following a farewell tour later that year.

The decision appeared to have been reversed, as the band continued to tour into the following year, with international performances in 2020 in New Zealand and Mexico. They then announced that further touring was "suspended due to the COVID-19 pandemic". The band has not performed since February 29, 2020, when they were in Aguascalientes, Mexico (at Isla San Marcos, La Soberana Ama 2020).

== Members ==
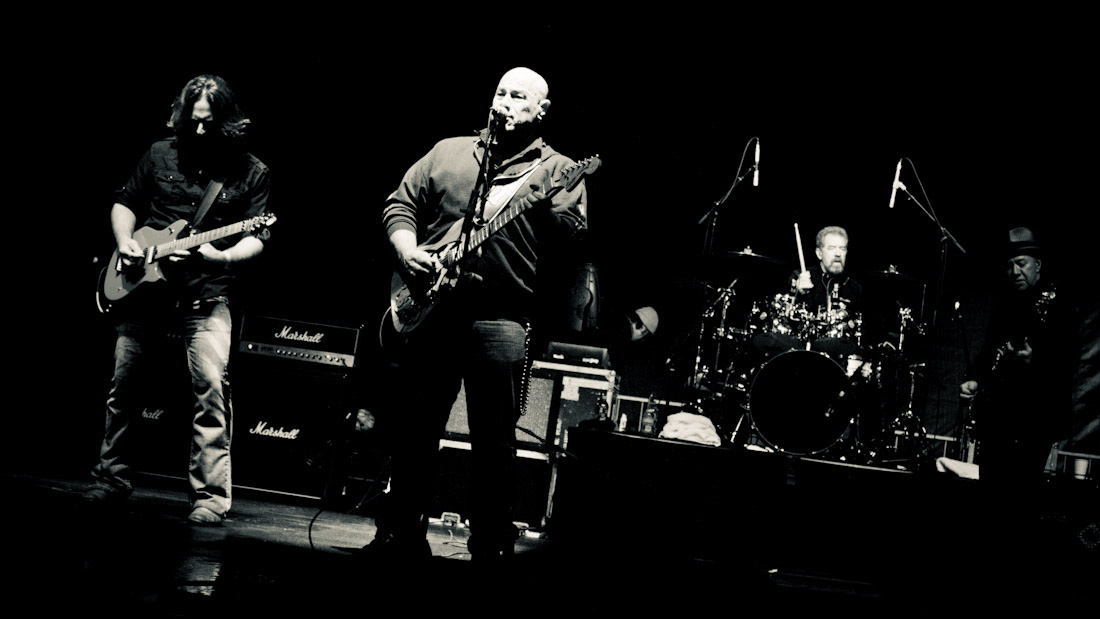
Creedence Clearwater Revisited in concert on May 29, 2011

=== Final lineup ===
- Doug Clifford – drums, percussion, backing vocals (1995–2020)
- Stu Cook – bass, backing vocals (1995–2020)
- Steve "The Captain" Gunner – rhythm and lead guitar, harmonica, keyboards, backing vocals (1995–2020)
- Kurt Griffey – lead guitar, backing vocals (2010–2020)
- Dan McGuinness – lead vocals, rhythm guitar (2016–2020)

=== Former members ===
- Elliot Easton – lead guitar, backing vocals (1995–2004)
- John Tristao – lead vocals, rhythm guitar (1995–2016)
- Tal Morris – lead guitar, backing vocals (2004–2010)
- Ron Wikso – drums (filling in occasionally for Doug Clifford – 2013–2019)

== Discography ==
- Recollection (1998) – A two-disc live album
- The Best of Creedence Clearwater Revisited (20th Century Masters – The Millennium Collection) (2006) – Live album
- JDRF Hope for the Holidays (2009) – "Run, Rudolph, Run"
- Extended Versions (2010) – Live album
- JDRF More Hope for the Holidays (2010) – "Run, Rudolph, Run"
- Playlist: The Very Best of Creedence Clearwater Revisited (2016) – Live album
