= Tom Fogerty (album) =

Studio album by Tom Fogerty
- Released: Early 1972
- Genre: Rock, blues rock
- Label: Fantasy Records
- Producer: Brian Gardner, Tom Fogerty

Tom Fogerty chronology
Tom Fogerty (1972)	Excalibur (1972)

Professional ratings
Review scores
Source	Rating
Christgau's Record Guide	D

Tom Fogerty is Tom Fogerty's first solo album.

== Chart performance ==
The album debuted on Billboard magazine's Top LP's chart in the issue dated June 3, 1972, peaking at No. 180 during a six-week run on the chart.

== Track listing ==
All songs written by Tom Fogerty.

1. "The Legend of Alcatraz" – 2:35
2. "Lady of Fatima" – 4:27
3. "Beauty Is Under the Skin" – 2:29
4. "Wondering" – 2:31
5. "My Pretty Baby" – 2:24
6. "Train to Nowhere" – 3:39
7. "Everyman" – 2:11
8. "The Me Song" – 2:26
9. "Cast the First Stone" – 2:11
10. "Here Stands the Clown" – 2:52

== Personnel ==
- Tom Fogerty – guitar, harmonica, vocals
- Rodger Collins – vocals ("Train to Nowhere")
- Russ Gary – guitar
- John Kahn – bass
- Billy Mundi – percussion
- Merl Saunders – keyboards, vocals
- Bill Vitt – drums, congas

== Charts ==
Chart (1972)	Peak position
US Top LPs (Billboard)	180

Singles

Year	Single	Chart	Position
1972	"Cast the First Stone"	US Easy Listening (Billboard)	42
