= Douglas Killmer =

- Also known as: Chico
- Born: Douglas Killmer; July 18, 1947; Chicago, Illinois, United States
- Died: August 29, 2005 (aged 58) Willits, California, United States
- Genres: Rock and roll, blues, blues-rock
- Occupation: Musician
- Instrument: Bass guitar
- Years active: 1963–2000

Douglas "Doug" Killmer (July 18, 1947 – August 29, 2005) was an American blues and rock bass guitarist active from the 1960s to the late 1990s. He is sometimes credited as Douglas Kilmer or Doug Kilmer. He is best remembered for playing the bass line on Norman Greenbaum's 1970 hit "Spirit in the Sky" (number 333 on Rolling Stone 's list of 500 greatest songs of all time). In addition to this, he played on the Otis Rush Grammy Award-nominated 1976 song "Right Place, Wrong Time," and Rita Abrams' Grammy-nominated song "Mill Valley." He was active in the San Francisco Bay Area music scene for over three decades.

== Early years ==
He was born in Chicago, Illinois. Shortly after his birth, his family moved to Okinawa in the Ryukyu Islands where his father was stationed as part of the American occupation force. After his father left the military, the family moved to India and Turkey as part of his father's job in the United States Foreign Service. During his early travels, he learned to speak Japanese, Hindustani (Hindi is the name of the language), and German.

As a teenager, he lived in Indialantic, Florida so that his father could pursue a career with NASA. He attended Melbourne High School in Melbourne, Florida where he was known as "Chico" by his closest friends. It was during this period that he learned to play the Guitar and Bass. (Actually he started playing guitar in Bombay in 1961, he picked up bass after returning to the US.) He played in a number of local bands in Indialantic during this period, such as his band "The Sonics".

At the age of 17, he and high school friends Russell DaShiell, Rick Jaeger, and Lance Massey formed the band "The Beau Gentry". They eventually relocated to the Midwest where the Beau Gentry experienced moderate success performing in Wisconsin.

== 1970s to 1990s ==
After the dissolution of the Beau Gentry, Killmer traveled to California where he played with a number of bands including Crowfoot that featured his Beau Gentry band-mates. He eventually settled in Novato, California with his wife and children. In 1970, he played the bass line on Norman Greenbaum's hit "Spirit in the Sky" which sold over a million copies and was certified gold. Shortly after this he appeared on American Bandstand with Greenbaums group where they performed Spirit in the Sky. He also played with such notables as Blue Cheer, Commander Cody, Nick Gravenites, Michael Bloomfield, David LaFlamme, Linda Tillery & The Loading Zone, The Stoval Sisters, Jesse Barish, Booker T. Jones, Luther Tucker, Charlie Musselwhite, Barry "The Fish" Melton, John Cipollina, Carla Thomas, Pete Escovedo & Azteca, Tommy Roe, The FG's, Mark Naftalin, The Dovells, Dee Clark, Redwing, and Curly Cooke's Hurdy Gurdy Band.

In 1997, Killmer got pneumonia which landed him in the hospital for several months and nearly took his life. During this time, his friends in the music industry organized two benefits, one at the Sweetwater Saloon in Mill Valley, California and the other at Maritime Hall in San Francisco, California, in order to raise money for his wife and three young children. After beating pneumonia, he was no longer able to afford the high cost of living in Novato, California so he decided to move his family north.

During the late-1990s, he moved with his wife and three children to Mendocino County, California. In Mendocino County, he moved his family to Brooktrails just outside Willits, California. After living there for 18 months, he again moved his family, this time to a remote 600-acre (2.4 km^{2}) cattle ranch between Willits, California and Laytonville, California. During this period, he continued to perform in Occidental, California at Negri's Bar every Friday night with Nick Gravenites.

== Later years ==
Killmer stopped performing regularly in 2000 in order to spend time with his family and help raise his young children. During this period, he performed irregularly and spent most of his time taking care of his children and performing duties on the ranch. He also became active in his children's school, Sherwood School, in the mountains north of Willits, California. He served as president of F.O.S.S.I, Friends of Sherwood School Incorporated, during this period.

He died on August 29, 2005, at his home surrounded by his family, after a long battle with liver cancer. His life was celebrated by his fellow San Francisco Bay Area musicians at a fund-raiser memorial for his family in Mill Valley, California at the Sweetwater Saloon.
