= Hans Olson =

American singer-songwriter

- Born: July 3, 1952 (age 74)
- Occupation: singer-songwriter
- Years active: 1968-present
- Known for: "harp-in-a-rack"
- Notable work: Phoenix Blues Society (1988), the Arizona Green Party (1991), the Arizona Blues Hall of Fame (1995), the Arizona Music Heritage Foundation and the Arizona Music and Entertainment Hall of Fame (2002)

Hans Olson (born July 3, 1952), is an American musician and songwriter. He is a singer and plays an amplified acoustic guitar and a harmonica in a neck rack. He is known as one of the best "harp-in-a-rack" players in the world. Olson helped to establish and organize the Phoenix Blues Society (1988), the Arizona Green Party (1991), the Arizona Blues Hall of Fame (1995), the Arizona Music Heritage Foundation and the Arizona Music and Entertainment Hall of Fame (2002). In 1996, Olson was inducted into the Arizona Blues Hall of Fame. Both Phoenix Magazine and Phoenix New Times named Olson as one of the most influential musicians in Arizona.

== Musical style and influences ==
Olson usually performs solo, although he has played with many bands throughout his career. Olson combines a blend of blues, country, folk music and original songs. Olson has played with bands and artists such as The Allman Brothers, Tom Waits, ZZ Top, B.B. King, Muddy Waters, Allison Kraus, Chuck Berry, Bonnie Raitt, Joe Cocker, and John Fogerty. His early inspirations were Johnny Cash, Bob Dylan, The Rolling Stones, and Muddy Waters. He is currently endorsed by Lee Oskar harmonicas.

== Biography ==
=== Early years ===
Olson was born in San Bernardino, California in 1952. At the age of five, his cousin threw an errant arrow which resulted in the loss of his eye. Olson's father died the same year. At the age of six, he watched Gene Kelly dance on TV and decided he wanted to be in show business. At the age of nine, Olson heard the music of Johnny Cash and decided he wanted to become a musician. He began playing music at the age of 12 and by 13, Olson was playing gigs, which offered the opportunity to be away from his alcoholic stepfather. In his early teens, Olson became depressed and began drinking alcohol and using drugs.

=== Teenage years ===
In 1967, Olson began his music career in San Bernardino, California as a lead singer in a Rock & Roll band. He also began performing solo gigs in coffee shops. As a stunt, he used to carry around a switch blade. He cut his hand to "freak people out". On one occasion he was too intoxicated to realize he was holding a serrated steak knife. He ended up cutting too deep and temporarily lost all movement in his left hand. Due to his injury and limited mobility, Olson started to play the harmonica because it only required one hand. When his left hand eventually healed, he began to practice what became his trademark skill of playing the harmonica and the guitar at the same time.

In 1969, when he was 17 years old, Olson was disturbed by the news of Charles Manson's murder spree and the violence at the Altamont Speedway Free Festival. He decided to move away from California. He moved to Arizona to complete his high school degree and pursue his music career.

=== Music career ===
In 1971, Olson was hired to perform radio commercials for Kirk's Electronics in Tempe, Arizona. Over the years he recorded several station identification ads for Phoenix, Arizona area radio stations.

In 1973, Olson was the opening act for The Allman Brothers and Boz Skaggs, with more than 22,000 people in attendance. The same year, he recorded his first album, Western Winds with Phoenix label, Joplin Records. In 2012, on the 100th anniversary of Arizona's statehood, the title song from this album was listed in the Phoenix New Times magazine as one of Arizona's 100 greatest songs.

In 1980, he toured coast to coast with Dave Mason; they played over 100 shows together. The same year, his album, Hans Olson Sings the Blues, reached No. 3 on the local Tower Records sales chart.

In 1981, he recorded his album The Aspen Tapes with session musicians, Al Kooper, Albert Lee, and Mark Naftalin and produced by William E. McEuen, the manager and producer for the Nitty Gritty Dirt Band.

In 1982, Olson toured with Brownie McGhee, playing harmonica and guitar. This same year, Tom Fogerty recorded one of Olson's songs as the title track on his Fantasy Records release album, Deal it Out.

In the mid 1980s Olson was part of the quartet, Hans Olson and the Rhythm Masters.

In 1986 Olson helped found the Sun Club, a former hub of the Tempe music scene. The Sun Club was fundamental in launching the careers of acts such as Dead Hot Workshop and the Gin Blossoms. After a few years, Olson filed for bankruptcy, and in 1992, the Sun Club closed.

In 1988, Olson helped to establish and organize the Phoenix Blues Society.

In 1990, Olson sang the opening and closing theme for the Burt Reynold's television series, Evening Shade.

In 1991, he helped establish the Arizona Green Party.

In 1992, he toured as Michelle Shocked's opening act, and headlined a 40 day European tour, performing in France, Germany and Austria. Phoenix radio station, KZON, used his song "You Wish" to launch its programming.

In 1993, he performed at the Peer Rhythm and Blues Festival in Belgium along with Albert Collins, Delbert McClinton, The Five Blind Boys of Alabama, CJ Chenier, and The Jeff Healey Band. He also performed at the Free Wheels Festival in France. He won "Best Solo Act" of the year at the Arizona Entertainment Awards show. He also won "Best Solo Act" of the year in the Phoenix New Times Weekly, reader's choice awards. Several of his songs were played on the Time Warner mini-series "The Wild West."

In 1995, Olson helped create the Arizona Blues Hall of Fame.

In 2000, he created the Sun Club Records label.

In 2002, he helped found the Arizona Music and Entertainment Hall of Fame.

In 2006, Olson signed with Fervor Records and has produced three full-length albums and a music video for the label. Fervor also controls a vast majority of the Hans Olson back catalog.

=== Legacy ===
Olson continues to perform and owns a recording studio in Arizona. His music has been placed in various TV shows, films, advertisements, and soundtracks for motion pictures.

Olson's music has been released on many different record labels, including Virgin Records in Europe, Fervor Records in Phoenix, Arizona, and his own label, Sun Club Records.

In 2025 Hans released his autobiography book “Arizona Troubadour”. It’s available on Amazon.

== Discography ==
Artist	Album	Format	Record label	CAT #	Release date	Country
Hans Olson	Western Winds	LP	Joplin Records	LP-3266	1973	US
Hans Olson	Western Winds	LP, Album, RE	Marshall Records	10320	1980	US
Hans Olson	I'll Be Glad/Where Did it Go		Blond Sun Records	1001	1976	US
Hans Olson	Blonde Sun Album	LP, Album	Blonde Sun Records	1002	1977	US
Hans Olson	Sings The Blues	LP, Album	Creamo Records	1280	1980	US
Hans Olson	The Aspen Tapes	7", EP	Blond Sun Records	42136	1983	US
Hans Olson	Solo	Cassette	Blond Sun Records	1004		
Hans Olson	Hans Olson	CD, Album	Sky Ranch Records	SR 652314	1992	US
Hans Olson	Hans Olson	CD, Album	Sky Ranch Records, Virgin France	8390602, VI 390602	1992	US
Hans Olson	Where's the Grey?	Cassette	Blond Sun Records	1005	1992	
Hans Olson	Blues Spotlight	VHS	Phoenix Blues Society		1994	
Hans Olson	Arizona Blues	CD	Willing Productions	WG951	1995	France
Hans Olson	Kachina Blues	CD	Blond Sun Records	1006	1995	
Hans Olson	Other Sides	CD, Album	Willing Productions	WG 9801	1998	France
Hans Olson	The Best of Hans Olson, Volume One	CD, Album	Sun Club Records	70882	2000	
Hans Olson	The Best of Hans Olson, Volume Two	CD, Album	Blond Sun Records	BS 1008	2003	US
Hans Olson	The Best of Hans Olson	CD, Comp	Sun Club Records	SCR 70882	2000	US
Hans Olson	Another Day with the Blues	Digital Only	Fervor Records		2007	US
Hans Olson	Hard Time		Fervor Records		2009	US
Hans Olson	Dust to Dust		Fervor Records		2013	US
Various	Wisdom For the Road				2003	
Various	Ominous Clouds	LP, album	Last Flash Records	71752	1982	
Various	All Star Rhythm & Blues	Comp. Cassette	Tempest Recording	1	1985	
Various	357 Miles East of L.A.	Comp. Cassette	Zia Records	1	1989	
Various	Totally Bueno	Comp. Cassette	Zia Records	2	1991	
Various	Southwest Holiday	Comp. Cassette	Fervor Records	FVRC01	1991	
Various	Arizona Unplugged	Comp. Cassette	Fervor Records	FVRC112	1992	
Various	Hijole!	Comp. Cassette	Zia Records	3	1992	
Various	Studio Z Live KZON Radio	Comp. Album	Indio Records	ICD-9302	1993	
Various	The Music of the Wild West	Comp. Album	Aspen Records		1994	
Various	Studio Brussels-Blues Town		Dino Music	DNCD1425	1995	Belgium
Various	Desert Blues	Comp. Album	CDGB	1		
Various	Jazz, Rhythm & Groove	Comp. Album	Ooya Records		1997	
Various	Bluestown	Comp. Album	12th Street Records	TS3002	1998	
Various	The Music of the Wild West		Varese Sarabande Records	066821	2007	
Various	Blue Saguaro	Comp. Album	Fervor Records		1993	
Various	Sky Ranch: Discover America, Chapter 1	Comp. Album			1993	
Various	Shifting Gears		Artdream Entertainment		2003	
Various	2 Hours From Anywhere	Comp. Album	Perfect Circle Records		2003	
Various	Folk is Not a Four Letter Word, Vol. 2				2006	
Various	Justified	Comp.	Madison Gate Records		2015	US
Tom Fogerty	Deal It Out		Fantasy		1981	
John McEuen & Hans Olson	Good Old Rebel	MP3	Varese Sarabande		2014	
Steven Martin	The Crow: New Songs for the Five-String Banjo				2009	

== TV and film credits ==
Artist	Song title	Program	Episode #	Film/TV	Network	Airdate
Hans Olson	Opening and Closing Theme Song	Evening Shade		TV	CBS	
Hans Olson	"Another Day with the Blues"	Army Wives	710	TV	Lifetime	5/12/2013
Hans Olson	"Another Day with the Blues"	Army Wives	501	TV	Lifetime	3/6/2011
Hans Olson	"Another Day with the Blues"	Chicago Fire	315	TV	NBC	2/17/2015
Hans Olson	"Another Day with the Blues"	Chicago Fire	205	TV	NBC	10/15/2013
Hans Olson	"When I Get the Blues"	Being Human	110	TV	SyFy	3/28/2011
Hans Olson	"Spirit of New Orleans"	Chicago Med	104	TV	NBC	12/8/2015
Hans Olson	"All Night Boogie"	Comic Book Men	101	TV	AMC	2/12/2012
Hans Olson	"All Night Boogie"	Stevie TV		TV	VH1	7/1/2013
Hans Olson	"On the Porch Blues"	Comic Book Men	101	TV	AMC	2/12/2012
Hans Olson	"Mean Disposition"	Comic Book Men	105	TV	AMC	3/11/2012
Hans Olson	"Mean Disposition"	Outlaw Chronicles		TV	History	9/1/2015
Hans Olson	"These Blues and Me"	Comic Book Men	105	TV	AMC	3/11/2012
Hans Olson	"Something Bad"	Haven	403	TV	SyFy	9/27/2013
Hans Olson	"Something Bad"	Rock the Kasbah		Film	Open Road Films	10/22/2015
Hans Olson	"Something Bad"	Vaugand		TV	French Network Television	7/1/2013
Hans Olson	"Send You Back to Mama"	Justified	601	TV	FX	1/20/2015
Hans Olson	"Western Winds"	Justified	412	TV	FX	2/17/2015
Hans Olson	"Hard Time"	Justified	412	TV	FX	3/26/2013
Hans Olson	"Freeway Boogie"	Mr. Pig		Film	Independent	1/26/2016
Hans Olson	"50s Ups and 50s Downs"	NCIS	1217	TV	CBS	3/10/2015
Hans Olson	"50s Ups and 50s Downs"	Chicago Justice	105	TV	NBC	3/19/2017
Hans Olson	"The Sun's Going Down on Me"	One Tree Hill	812	TV	The CW	1/25/2011
Hans Olson	"The Sun's Going Down on Me"	Chicago PD	504	TV	NBC	10/18/2017
Hans Olson	"The Sun's Going Down on Me"	Vaugand		TV	French Network Television	7/1/2013
Hans Olson	"Someday"	Stevie TV		TV	VH1	7/1/2013
Hans Olson	"Someday"	Suburgatory	112	TV	ABC	1/18/2012
Hans Olson	"Sail On"	Goliath	103	SVOD	Amazon	10/14/2016
Hans Olson	"Rich Man Poor Man"	Wynonna Earp	202	TV	SyFy	6/16/2017
Hans Olson	"Earthman"	The Guest Book	1	TV	TBS	8/3/2017
Hans Olson	"Dark Road"	Chanel x Barneys		Ad		12/12/2017

His work can also be heard in the following shows:

- Cold Case
- George Lopez
- Ghost Whisperer
- Criminal Minds
- It's Always Sunny in Philadelphia
- Braving Alaska (National Geographic)
- The Wild West (Time-Life/Warner Bros. mini-series)
- The Music of the Wild West (TNN)
- Man Outside (Virgin Vision Films)
- Mill Ave., Inc. (Independent film)

== On tour ==
Olson has toured, performed, been an opening act for, and/or recorded with the following musicians (and others):

- Michelle Shocked
- Tom Waits
- Brownie McGhee
- Al Kooper
- Albert Lee
- Dallas Taylor
- Boz Scaggs
- Dave Mason
- Allman Brothers Band
- Arlo Guthrie
- Bonnie Raitt
- Albert Collins
- John Hammond
- Jeff Healey
- Five Blind Boys of Alabama
- Nitty Gritty Dirt Band
- Elvin Bishop
- Joe Cocker
- Gatemouth Brown
- Paul Butterfield
- Canned Heat
- John Fogerty
- Johnny Winter
- Edgar Winter
- Tony Martinez Band
- Stevie Ray Vaughan
- Willie Dixon
- John Lee Hooker
- B.B. King
- Muddy Waters
- Upsuck
