= Shakin' (Eddie Money song) =

Single by Eddie Money

from the album No Control
- B-side: "My Friends, My Friends"
- Released: September 1982
- Recorded: 1979–1981
- Genre: Rock
- Length: 3:08
- Label: Columbia
- Songwriters: Eddie Money, Elizabeth Myers, Ralph Carter

Eddie Money singles chronology
"Think I'm in Love" (1982)	"Shakin'" (1982)	"The Big Crash" (1983)

Music video
- "Shakin'" on YouTube

"Shakin'" is a song by American rock singer Eddie Money from his Platinum-certified album No Control, released in 1982. It was co-written by Money, Elizabeth Myers, and Ralph Carter, and released as a single, reaching #63 on the Billboard Hot 100 chart and #9 on the Mainstream Rock Tracks. The song remains one of Money's most popular among fans.

== Music video ==
The video for the single featured actress/model Patricia Kotero, better known as Apollonia, as the female doing the "shakin". She would later go on to co-star in the film Purple Rain.

== Lyrics ==
In 2018, Money confirmed a longstanding theory to Rolling Stone magazine that the song did indeed include the word "tits" ("Her tits were shakin' 'til the middle of the night"), even in the version played on the radio.

In a 2009 interview with Opie and Anthony, Money said that the lyric controversy prevented many AM radio stations from playing the song, greatly limiting its position on music charts. He estimated the lack of airplay cost him "close to $500,000" in lost revenue. Money expressed remorse, saying, "it would've been a top-10 single," and "I was young and dumb and I had to say tits... but I still love it."

== In popular culture ==
The song is a playable track on the music video game Guitar Hero Encore: Rocks the 80s. The song's video was featured on an episode of Beavis and Butt-Head. The duo enjoyed the video, particularly Money's faces while watching Apollonia dance around.

Money performed the song on an episode of The King of Queens episode titled “Eddie Money”.
