= Zephyr National =

Studio album by Tom Fogerty
- Released: April 1974
- Genre: Rock
- Label: Fantasy
- Producer: Russ Gary

Tom Fogerty chronology
Excalibur (1972)	Zephyr National (1974)	Myopia (1974)

Zephyr National is Tom Fogerty's third solo album. His brother John played on the album, but recorded his parts separately from former CCR band members Doug Clifford and Stu Cook on the one song ("Mystic Isle Avalon") on which they all performed. This marked the final recording where all four members of Creedence Clearwater Revival played on the same song.

== Track listing ==
All compositions written by Tom Fogerty

1. "It's Been a Good Day" – 2:25
2. "Can You Feel It" – 2:06
3. "Mystic Isle Avalon" – 2:38
4. "Reggie" – 2:15
5. "Money (Root the Root)" – 2:42
6. "Hot Buttered Rum" – 2:04
7. "Joyful Resurrection" – 3:51
8. "Heartbeat" – 2:22
9. "Fate" – 3:11
10. "Goin' Back to Okeefenokee" – 3:26

== Personnel ==
- Tom Fogerty – guitar, harmonica, vocals
- John Fogerty – lead guitar on "Mystic Isle Avalon"
- Stu Cook – bass, synthesizer, lead guitar on "Joyful Resurrection"
- Doug Clifford – drums, vocals
- Tom Phillips – guitar, pedal steel
- Gary Potterton – guitar
- Russ Gary – guitar, vocals, producer
- Stephen Funk – keyboards
- Jeff Nerell – steel drums
- Ron Stallings – saxophone
- The Stovalls – vocals

== Charts ==
Year	Single	Chart	Position
1973	"Joyful Resurrection" (released September 22, 1973)	Canada Top 100 Singles (RPM)	90
