= No Control (Eddie Money album) =

Studio album by Eddie Money
- Released: June 11, 1982
- Recorded: 1981–1982
- Studio: Criteria Studios (Miami, Florida); The Automatt (San Francisco, California); Wally Heider Recording Studios (Los Angeles, California)
- Genre: Rock
- Length: 37:03
- Label: Wolfgang, Columbia
- Producer: Tom Dowd

Eddie Money chronology
Playing for Keeps (1980)	No Control (1982)	Where's the Party? (1983)

Singles from No Control
- 1. "Think I'm In Love" Released: June 1982; 2. "Shakin'" Released: September 1982

No Control is the fourth studio album by American rock musician Eddie Money. The album was released on June 11, 1982, by Wolfgang Records and Columbia Records. It was Platinum-certified in 1987, and contains the hits "Think I'm In Love" and "Shakin'." It also features the song "Passing By the Graveyard (Song for John B.)", a tribute to actor and comedian John Belushi.

Professional ratings
Review scores
Source	Rating
AllMusic	3.5/5 stars

== Track listing ==
No.	Title	Writer(s)	Length
1.	"Shakin'"	Eddie Money, Ralph Carter, Elizabeth Myers	3:07
2.	"Runnin' Away"	Money, Mark Leonard, Alan Pasqua	3:33
3.	"Think I'm in Love"	Money, Randy Oda	3:10
4.	"Hard Life"	Money, Carter	3:50
5.	"No Control"	Money, Carter, Johnny Gunn	3:56
6.	"Take a Little Bit"	Money, Dave Lambert, Spencer Proffer	3:23
7.	"Keep My Motor Runnin'"	Money, Carter	3:11
8.	"My Friends, My Friends"	Money	3:15
9.	"Drivin' Me Crazy"	Money, Randy Nichols	3:04
10.	"Passing By the Graveyard (Song for John B.)"	Money, Michael Polteau	3:07
11.	"It Could Happen to You"	Frankie Bleu	3:27
Total length:			37:01

== Personnel ==
Musicians

- Eddie Money – vocals, harmonica (5, 8), mah-mah-mah-mah-mahs (1)
- Randy Nichols – acoustic piano (1, 4–6, 8), organ (1, 4, 5, 8–11), synthesizers (2, 4, 9)
- Alan Pasqua – electric piano (1, 7), clavinet (1, 7), acoustic piano (2, 4, 10)
- Jimmy Lyon – guitars, acoustic guitar (4)
- Marty Walsh – guitars (1–4, 6, 7, 10), acoustic guitar (8)
- Chuck Kirkpatrick – guitars (3, 11)
- Ralph Carter – bass, acoustic guitar (4, 5)
- Gary Ferguson – drums (1, 5, 7)
- Gary Mallaber – drums (2–4, 10)
- Art Wood – drums (6, 8)
- Tony Brock – drums (9)
- Joe Caldo – drums (11)
- Ed Calle – saxophone (2, 10, 11)

Backing vocals

- Lynn Carter (1)
- Ralph Carter (1–3, 5–7, 10)
- Randy Nichols (1–7, 9–11)
- Chuck Kirkpatrick (2, 3, 7, 10, 11)

=== Production ===
- Tom Dowd – producer, arrangements
- Eddie Money – arrangements
- Andy Johns – engineer (1–8, 10, 11)
- David Frazer – engineer (9)
- Michael Carnevale – assistant engineer
- Bob Castle – assistant engineer
- Peter Doell – assistant engineer
- Dennis Hetzendorfer – assistant engineer
- Mike Fuller – mastering
- Mick Brigden – creative consultant
- Connie Jester – creative consultant
- George Holz – cover photography
- Bill Graham Management – management

== Charts ==
Chart (1982)	Peak position
US Billboard 200	20
