= Randy Oda =

Rock and roll musician and composer

- Born: El Cerrito, California
- Education: Kennedy High School
- Occupations: Guitarist, composer
- Known for: Rock and roll

Randy Oda is a composer and musician who performed with Tom Fogerty and the band Ruby, recording the albums Ruby, Rock & Roll Madness and Sidekicks. He co-composed the 1982 Eddie Money hit song, "Think I'm in Love", which Arnold Schwarzenegger also used on an exercise video. His "BART" instrumental was used by BBC School Music during intervals. His latest band is 'OPO.

== Personal life and education ==
Randall Keith Oda was born in 1953 in Alameda County, California. He attended Kennedy High School in Richmond, California. Oda married Michelle Jean Nugent in 1985, and their son Daniel Thomas Oda was born in 1990. In 2017 he married Theresa Michele Barranco.

== Career ==
Beginning in late 1971, Randy Oda, his brother Kevin Oda, Art Pantoja, and Kyle Schneider formed the band "Oda", producing two albums on the Loud Phonograph Albums label. A local Bay Area band, they played gigs in Berkeley. They also played a reunion benefit at Concord in 2015.

In the early 1970s, Oda joined Tom Fogerty in the band Ruby, with Oda on guitar, Anthony Davis on bass, and Bobby Cochran on drums. Reviewer Phillip Elwood of the San Francisco Examiner wrote, "...when Randy Oda, nominally the band's solo guitar, gets into an extended theme the band backs him with all the flair of a seasoned jazz-blues-rock orchestra."

A 1978 Santa Cruz Sentinel review of Ruby said Oda was:

...a session musician prior to joining Ruby, playing on television and radio commercials, including those for McDonald's. His sounds transcends the Big Mac, though, as he is a sensitive and hot guitarist. His instrumental composition "BART" (after Bay Area Rapid Transit) immediately picked up the show and shook up the crowd Friday night. Oda's instrumental compositions are not unlike Jeff Beck or Pablo Cruise in the way they build up to a whining crescendo.

— Greg Beese

Oda's "BART" instrumental was used by the BBC during school intervals in the 1970s and 1980s.

Ruby released two studio albums, Ruby in 1976 and Rock & Roll Madness in 1978, and then disbanded. They released Precious Gems, a compilation album, in 1984. Oda and Fogerty's Sidekicks was released in 1992 after Fogerty died, with Oda's credits on the album listed as "Arranger, Composer, Guitar (Acoustic), Guitar (Electric), Keyboards, Primary Artist, Producer".

Oda co-wrote with Eddie Money the 1982 single, "Think I'm in Love", which Money recorded, taking the song to #1 on the Billboard Top Tracks chart. It appeared on Money's 1983 album, No Control, as well as Arnold Schwarzenegger's Total Body Workout video, and multiple compilation albums.

Oda joined his brother Kevin Oda on drums and Michael Politeau (bass) in the band 'OPO, an acronym for its members (Oda, Politeau, Oda), which also means "to lay a foundation" in Hawaiian. 'OPO produced the album Getaway in 2011.
