= John Trivers =

American musician (born 1946)

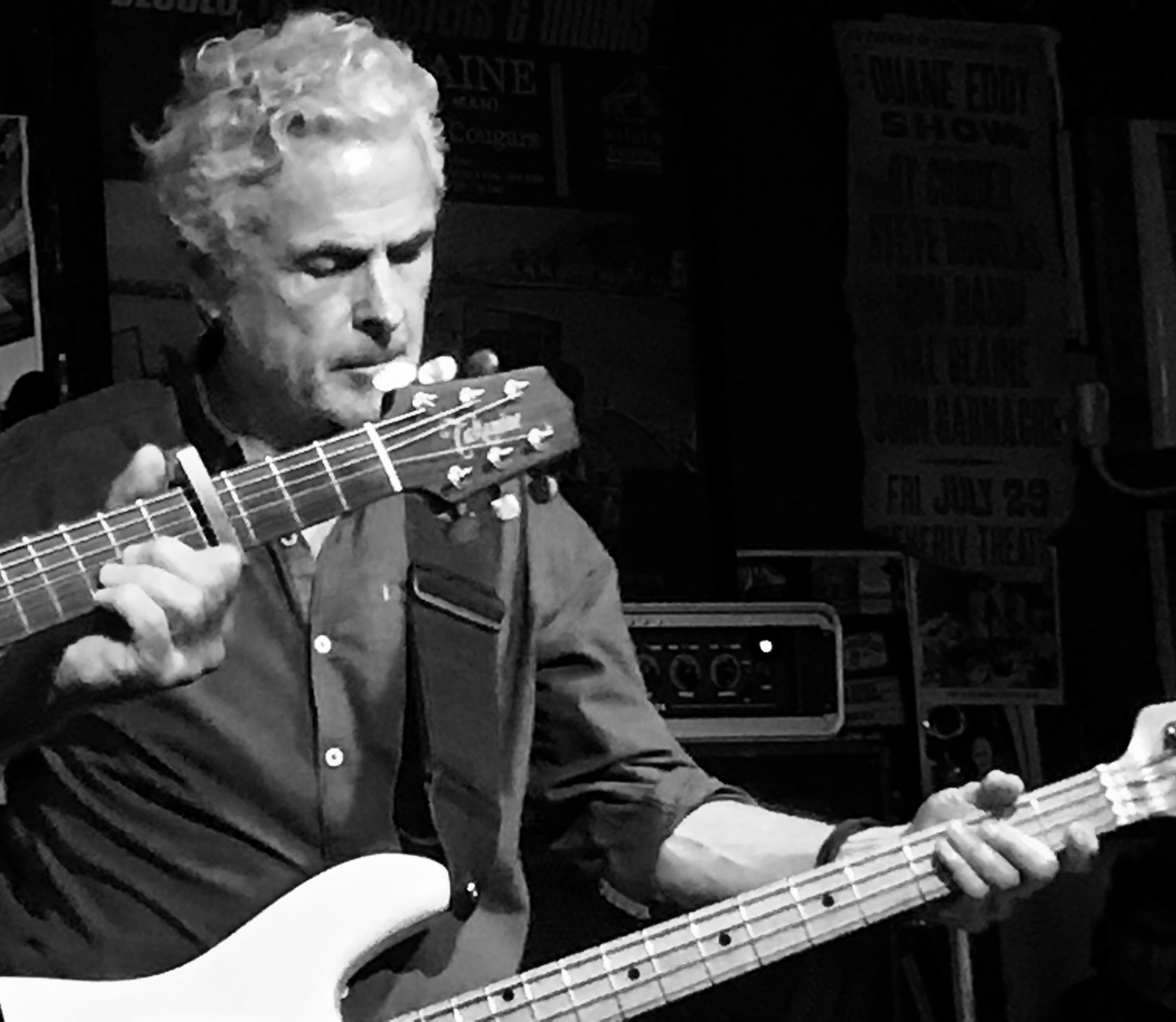
- John Trivers, 2017
- Born: 1946 (age 79–80)
- Occupations: Songwriter; musician
- Spouse: Liz Myers

John Trivers (born 1946) is an American songwriter and musician, the recipient of gold and platinum records for his involvement with Blue Öyster Cult and Tina Turner, and the co-writer with his wife and partner Elizabeth Myers of several popular themes for commercials, television programs, and film scores.

== Biography ==
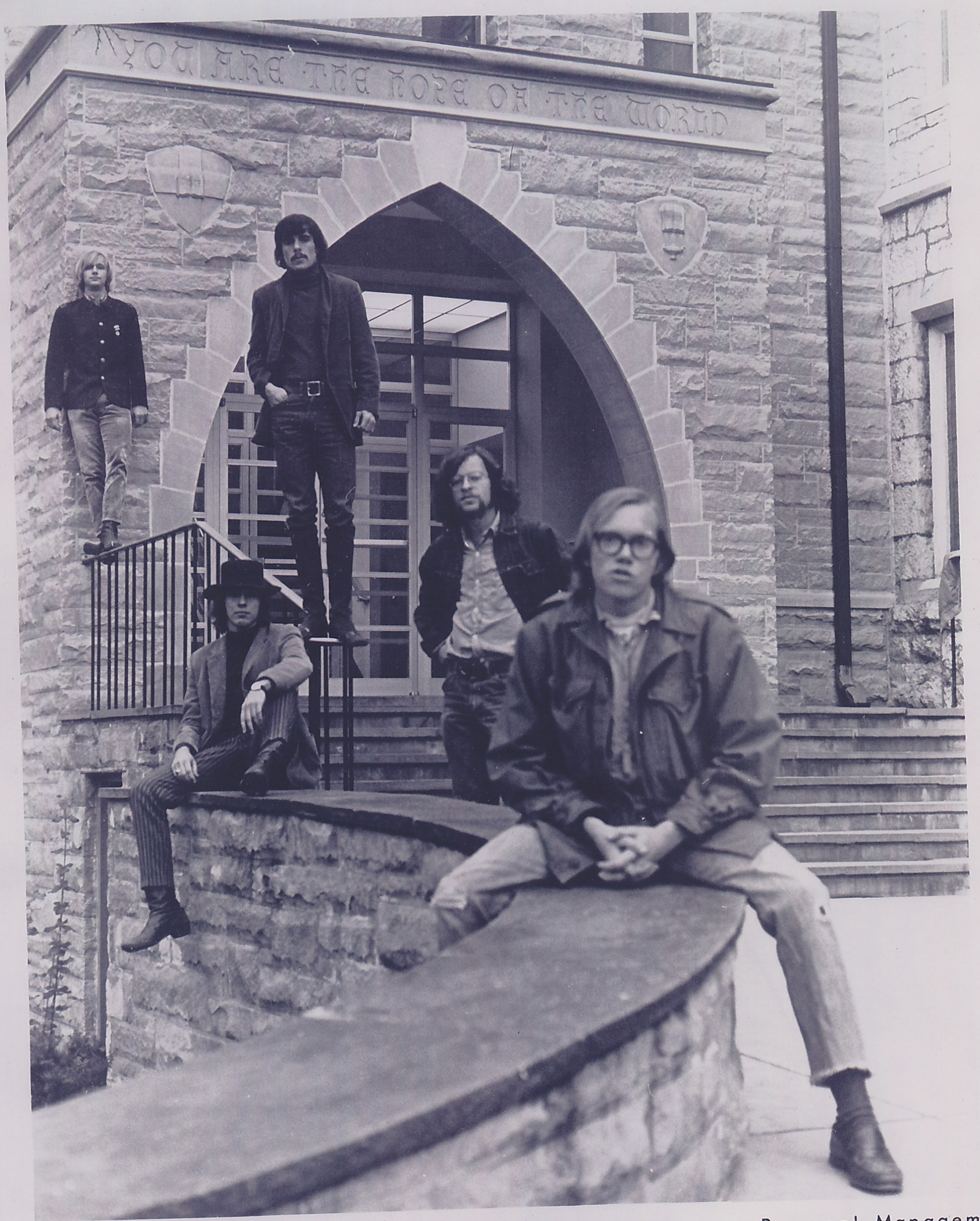
The group "Lost and Found", 1966. From left: Peter Haviland, Jeff Hayes, John Trivers, Eric Bloom, and George Faust

Trivers was born in Buffalo, New York, the son of Julian Trivers, a marketing consultant, and Patricia Culver, a homemaker. The third of five children, he was educated at The Hill School, an exclusive boarding school in Pennsylvania from which he graduated in 1965, and Hobart College, where he received a bachelor's degree in music in 1969. While at Hobart, he played bass for the band Lost and Found, fronted by Eric Bloom, with whom he would later collaborate on songs for Bloom's band Blue Öyster Cult.

From 1972 to 1979, he played for Broadway shows such as Grease which is where in 1976 he met his future wife, fellow musician Elizabeth (Liz) Myers. In 1980, he went on to study Film and Television Post-Production at UCLA, In the early 1980s, he was also a member of the Vancouver-based band Prism, signed with Capitol Records. He has played with four Grammy award winners, Janis Ian, Mary Travers, Peter Allen and Tina Turner with whom he recorded on "Private Dancer". His playing is featured in the Turner song "Total Control" from the "We Are the World" record.

Trivers and his wife relocated to Los Angeles and started a commercial music business, Trivers-Myers Music, which has written well-known themes such as that used on the CBS Evening News, and the award-winning Apple Computer Macintosh campaign which was directed by Ridley Scott and Adrien Lyne. In 2004, they scored an animated commercial for United Airlines which was first broadcast during the Academy Awards and has since been displayed on exhibit at various art museums. The music was an arrangement of George Gershwin's "Rhapsody in Blue" and was recorded at Capitol Records with 40 members of the Los Angeles Philharmonic orchestra.

In 2008, they composed the soundtracks for five United Airlines commercials created especially for the Beijing Games. "Heart" featured a two-piano composition performed by Herbie Hancock and Chinese classical musician Lang Lang. The music was written and produced by Trivers and Myers. In 2011, Trivers and Myers music was featured on national broadcasts of Major League Baseball and the National Football League.

In 2015, author J.K. Rowling, in her crime novel Career of Evil, quoted lyrics from songs co-written by Trivers that appeared on albums by Blue Oyster Cult.

Trivers is the father of Julian Trivers, the drummer in the JUNO nominated Montreal band Busty and the Bass.

== Awards ==
- 1998, Composer (with Liz Myers and Jim Cox) for Best Western International "Manhattan" commercial, Clio Award, Television/Cinema, Certificate
- 1997, Composer (with Mark Isham) for Saturn Corporation ads "The Lift", "Tourist Attraction", "Secret Car". Clio Award, Television/Cinema
- 1996, Arranger/Composer (with Liz Myers), Blue Cross / Blue Shield "The Delivery", Clio Award, TV/Cinema
- 1988, Composer, Olympic Stain "Blueprint", U.S. Television/Cinema, Clio Winner
- 1986, Composer, Sunkist "Stamp Factory", U.S. Television, Clio Winner

== Works ==
=== As bass player ===
- Private Dancer - Tina Turner, 1982
  - "Rock'n Roll Widow", "When I Was Young"
- We Are the World – USA for Africa (1985)
  - "Total Control" (Tina Turner)
- Soft White Underbelly with Donald Roeser (Buck Dharma), Albert Bouchard, and Les Braunstein (1972)
  - "Dark Angel"

=== As songwriter/composer ===
==== with Blue Öyster Cult ====
- Mirrors, 1979
  - "The Great Sun Jester" (with Michael Moorcock and Eric Bloom)
- Cultosaurus Erectus, 1980
  - "Black Blade" (with Michael Moorcock and Eric Bloom)
- Fire of Unknown Origin, 1981
  - "Sole Survivor" (with Eric Bloom and L. Myers)
  - "After Dark" (with Eric Bloom and L. Myers)
- Curse of the Hidden Mirror, 2001
  - "Showtime" (with Eric Bloom)

==== with Elizabeth Myers ====
- Score for the film Birch Street Gym, directed by Steven Kessler for Chanticleer Films and nominated for an Academy Award in 1993 in the "Short Film" category
- Theme for the "CBS Evening News with Dan Rather" (with Alan Pasqua)
- 1998, Score for Norma Jean, Jack & Me, directed by Cyrus Nowrasteh for New Path Pictures
- 2000, Score for Broke Even, directed by David Feldman, which won the award for Best Drama at the 2000 New York Independent Film festival
- 2001, Score for the Oliver Stone-produced TV movie The Day Reagan Was Shot
