= Sidekicks (album) =

Studio album by Tom Fogerty and Randy Oda
- Released: 1992
- Recorded: 1988; Studio D, Fantasy Studios, Berkeley, California
- Genre: Swamp rock
- Label: Fantasy

Tom Fogerty and Randy Oda chronology
Precious Gems (1984)	Sidekicks (1992)

Professional ratings
Review scores
Source	Rating
AllMusic	3/5 stars

Sidekicks (also known as Rainbow Carousel) is an album by Tom Fogerty and Randy Oda (who previously worked together in the rock band Ruby). The album was recorded in 1988 and released in 1992 on Fantasy Records, two years after Fogerty's death in 1990. Due to its posthumous release, Sidekicks stands as Fogerty's final studio work.

== Background ==
During spring 1988, Fogerty and Oda reunited to work on new material for the album that would become Sidekicks. Recorded at Studio D at Fantasy Studios in Berkeley, additional overdubs were recorded at Chaton Recording in Scottsdale. The project saw Fogerty's son Jeff and Oda's brother Kevin on bass and drums respectively. After completing half of the album, Fogerty and Oda agreed to return to the studio at a later date so that Fogerty could spend more time with his newly-born daughter. However, soon after, Fogerty fell ill with pneumonia and was diagnosed with AIDS; believed to have been from an unscreened blood transfusion during Fogerty's back surgery earlier in the decade. After recovering from the pneumonia, Fogerty was able to continue working on Sidekicks.

In the album's liner notes, Fogerty's wife Trish said:

"For Tom, Sidekicks was the culmination of an incredibly close friendship and an absolute musical synchronicity that developed when Tom and Randy first worked together in 1974 with Ruby. When Tom returned to the studio, [after his AIDS diagnosis], his first desire was to finish what now was not just another recording project, but for Tom, a statement. He truly felt that his illness - and all he had gone through - had happened for a reason, that something positive needed to be the result of it and that he would settle for nothing less than his ideal vision of musical perfection for this album. He and Randy went back into the studio with a totally new sense of direction, inspiration and passion. The result is really - I think - a very emotional, intense giving of Tom's true heart and soul. The record evolved into a driving, soulful body of work that Tom and Randy were both incredibly, totally proud of. It was something they put their all into - all energy - all emotion - all talent."

After its completion, Fantasy Records decided not to release the album. Fogerty died of AIDS-related tuberculosis in September 1990, and Sidekicks would be posthumously released by Fantasy in 1992. In Germany, the album was released by Line Records. For this version, the artist name was changed to "Sidekicks" and the title Rainbow Carousel. In preparation for its release, the album was digitally remastered by George Horn at Fantasy Studios during the same year.

== Track listing ==
All tracks written by Tom Fogerty and Randy Oda, except where noted.

1. "Rainbow Carousel" – 7:40
2. "Money Buys It (Funky Side of Town)" – 3:00
3. "Video Girl" – 4:40
4. "Woman of the Year" – 4:12
5. "Clearwater Rain" – 2:56
6. "Teardrops" – 4:03
7. "We've Been Here Before" – 4:26
8. "Sometimes" – 4:42
9. "Sloop John B." (Traditional) – 4:40
10. "Unbearable Lightness of Being" (Fogerty) – 4:02

== Personnel ==
- Tom Fogerty – vocals, acoustic guitar, electric guitar, producer, arranger
- Randy Oda – acoustic guitar, electric guitar, keyboards, producer, arranger
- Jeff Fogerty – bass, backing vocals
- Kevin Oda – drums, percussion, sequence programming
- David Luke – chief engineer, co-mixing
- Bob Ross – additional engineer, drum and keyboard sequencing
- Tom Size, Steve Escallier, Mark Seagraves – additional engineers
- George Horn – digital remastering
- Paul Markow – photography
