= Goodbye Media Man =

1971 single by Tom Fogerty

"Goodbye Media Man (Part 1)"

Single by Tom Fogerty
- B-side: "Goodbye Media Man (Part 2)"
- Released: April 1971
- Genre: Soft Rock
- Length: 3:25
- Label: Fantasy
- Songwriter: Tom Fogerty
- Producers: Brian Gardner, Tom Fogerty

Tom Fogerty singles chronology
"Goodbye Media Man (Part 1)" (1971)	"Cast The First Stone" (1972)

"Goodbye Media Man" is Tom Fogerty's self-penned debut single released in April 1971, shortly after leaving Creedence Clearwater Revival. The song is one of Fogerty's most successful singles, becoming a minor hit on the US Cash Box charts, making the Top 20 in Argentina, Top 40 in Germany, and bubbling under the Billboard Hot 100.

== Reception ==
A Cash Box Magazine "Newcomer Picks" singles reviews page dated July 31, 1971 states the following about the single: "First solo effort by Tom still reveals shades of the current Creedence sound. Driving rhythms should guarantee single its place on the pop charts."

A Record World Picks of The Week singles reviews dated July 31, 1971 gives another view: "Brother Tom's first post-Creedence solo venture will really grow on listeners. Its message is a topical one. He wrote and plays with Merl Saunders and Bill Vitt."

== Charts ==
Year	Single	Chart	Position
1971	"Goodbye Media Man"	US Bubbling Under Hot 100	3
1971	"Goodbye Media Man"	US Cash Box	93
1971	"Goodbye Media Man"	US Cash Box R&B	57
1971	"Goodbye Media Man"	US Cash Box Jukebox Programming Guide	7
1971	"Goodbye Media Man"	Argentina	18
1971	"Goodbye Media Man"	Canada Pop Singles	67
1971	"Goodbye Media Man"	Germany Top 100	36
