= Excalibur (Tom Fogerty album) =

Studio album by Tom Fogerty
- Released: October 1972
- Genre: Rock
- Label: Fantasy Records

Tom Fogerty chronology
Tom Fogerty (1972)	Excalibur (1972)	Zephyr National (1974)

Professional ratings
Review scores
Source	Rating
AllMusic	2.5/5 stars

Excalibur is an album by American guitarist and singer Tom Fogerty. His second solo effort, it was released in 1972. The album features Jerry Garcia on guitar and pedal steel guitar, Merl Saunders on keyboards, John Kahn on bass, and Bill Vitt on drums (Jerry and the band were all signed on the same label, Fantasy Records, for the albums Live at Keystone and its follow-ups).

== Track listing ==
All songs written by Tom Fogerty, except where noted.

1. "Forty Years" – 3:40
2. "Black Jack Jenny" – 2:30
3. "Rocky Road Blues" – 3:56 (Bill Monroe)
4. "Faces, Places, People" – 3:55
5. "Get Funky" – 1:54
6. "Sick and Tired" – 4:20 (Chris Kenner, Dave Bartholomew)
7. "Sign of the Devil" – 2:37
8. "Straight and Narrow" – 3:48
9. "Next in Line" – 2:16
10. "(Hold On) Annie Mae" – 3:49

== Personnel ==
- Tom Fogerty – guitar, harmonica, vocals
- Jerry Garcia – guitar, pedal steel guitar
- Merl Saunders – keyboards
- John Kahn – bass
- Bill Vitt – drums
