= Ruby (Ruby album) =

Studio album by Ruby
- Released: 1977
- Label: PBR International
- Producer: Tom Fogerty

Ruby chronology
Ruby (1977)	Rock & Roll Madness (1978)

Ruby is the debut album by American rock group Ruby, featuring Tom Fogerty.

== Track listing ==
Side One
No.	Title	Writer(s)	Length
1.	"Life Is But a Dream"	Randy Oda, Tom Fogerty	3:26
2.	"Can You Really Say"	Anthony Davis	2:37
3.	"BART"	Oda	5:17
4.	"Starry Eyed"	Bobby Cochran	5:12
5.	"Baby, What You Want Me to Do"	Jimmy Reed	4:10

Side Two
No.	Title	Writer(s)	Length
1.	"Running Back to Me"	Oda, Fogerty, Cochran	7:24
2.	"Take Me Back to London"	Oda, Fogerty	4:15
3.	"It's Taking a Long Time"	Oda	3:42
4.	"Slippin' and Slidin'/Big Fat Woman"	Penniman, Bocage, Collins, Smith / B. Freeman	5:08

== Personnel ==
- Tom Fogerty – guitar, vocals
- Randy Oda – guitar, keyboards, vocals
- Anthony Davis – bass, vocals
- Bobby Cochran – drums, vocals
- Ed Bogas – bass on "Baby, What You Want Me to Do"

== Trivia ==
The instrumental track "BART" was frequently used by the BBC to accompany test cards, during intervals between schools programmes, and over Pages from Ceefax in the late 1970s and early 1980s, and sporadically thereafter.

BART was also used for the musical highlights section of BBC's review of the 1987 Formula 1 season.

When the digital switchover happened, the track was chosen to play out the last Pages from Ceefax prior to the closure of analogue teletext in the UK on BBC2, in the early morning of 22 October 2012.

== Reception ==
A Cash Box Magazine album review dated April 9, 1977, states "It would be hard to follow the high quality work that Tom Fogerty put into Creedence Clearwater Revival but Fogerty's new band, Ruby, deserves more than a casual listen. The combined talents of this quartet are potently showcased in their ability to play fast and funky or slow and silky with equal aplomb and careful control. For AOR and top 40 playlists."
