= Ruby (American band) =

American rock band

- Origin: California, USA
- Genres: Rock music
- Years active: 1976–1978
- Labels: PBR International, Fantasy
- Past members: Randy Oda; Bobby Cochran; Anthony Davis; Tom Fogerty

Ruby was an American rock band that between 1976 and 1978 recorded two albums, Ruby and Rock & Roll Madness. In 1984, the compilation Precious Gems (which was credited to Tom Fogerty + Ruby) was released. In 1988, Randy Oda and Tom Fogerty made another album, Sidekicks, with Kevin Oda on drums, and Tom's son Jeff on bass; the album was not released until five years later, by which point Fogerty had died.

== Personnel ==
- Tom Fogerty – guitar, harmonica, vocals
- Randy Oda – guitar, keyboards, vocals
- Anthony Davis – bass, vocals
- Bobby Cochran – drums, percussions, vocals
- (Ed Bogas performs the bass on "Baby, What You Want Me to Do" on the first album)
