= Liz Myers =

American musician, composer, pianist

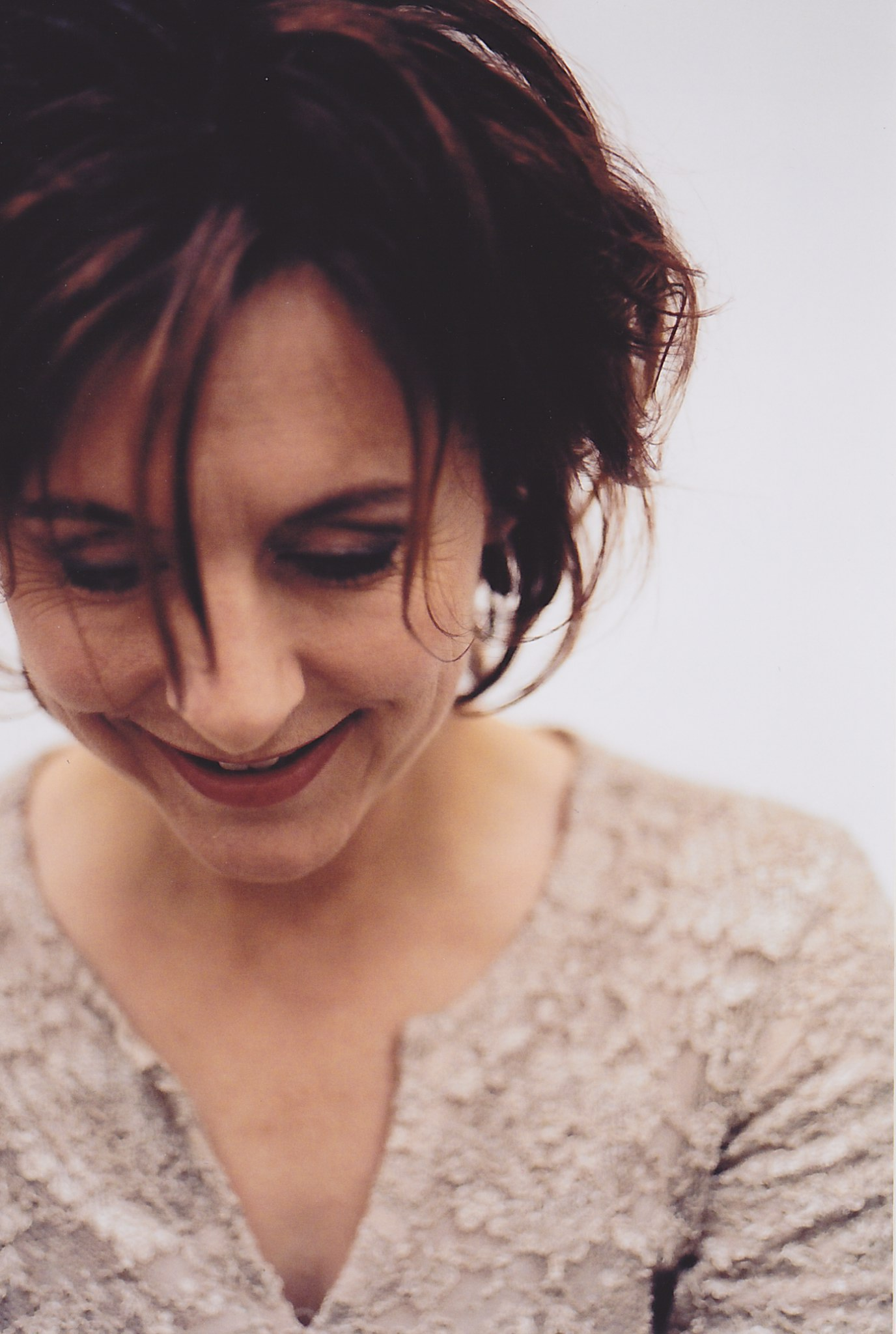
- Born: Elizabeth Myers
- Occupations: Composer and musician
- Spouse: John Trivers

Elizabeth Myers is an American musician, composer, pianist and singer. She co-wrote the Eddie Money song "Shakin'", but is best known for her collaborations with her husband, John Trivers on the music for several award-winning commercials and films. Their music company Trivers Myers Music, established in 1984, has composed or arranged music for many clients, and received multiple Clio Awards. They have arranged and produced the music for several commercials for United Airlines, one of which, "A Life", is a part of the permanent collection at the Museum of Modern Art. In 2011, the theme for the CBS Evening News that Myers co-wrote with Trivers and Alan Pasqua was relaunched for the broadcasts that feature Scott Pelley as news anchor. Most recently, in summer 2020, pianist Myers along with cellist Paula Hochhalter who comprise the chamber music duo Trufflemusik, released “A Sweet of Brahms.” The duo was formed in 2017 to reimagine classical masterworks by adding the cello, therefore creating an expanded repertoire for cello and piano. The duo strongly felt that this Brahms’ music was ripe for some cello: “The result is both sonorous and vibrant, a lively and strong reimagination of a classical master.”

== Biography ==
Myers earned a bachelor's degree in composition from the University of North Carolina School of the Arts, and then a master's degree in music from UNC Chapel Hill. She then studied composition with Nadia Boulanger at the "Ecole d'arts americains" and later privately with Jacques Rouvier in Paris. On returning to the States, she was hired as the musical director of the Broadway show "Grease" in New York, which is where she met her future husband, John Trivers. They formed a music company, Trivers/Myers Music, which has composed scores for many major commercials. In 2004, they arranged a version of George Gershwin's "Rhapsody in Blue" for an animated commercial for United Airlines, "A Life". The ad became so popular, it was broadcast during the Academy Awards, and displayed in art museums. The couple continued to arrange and produce music for several other United Commercials, such as "The Night", when a jet-lagged business traveler ventures out from his hotel to be taken on a whirlwind tour by a moped driver. The music was selected by SHOOT magazine as one of the Top 10 music tracks of the summer.

She has conducted members of the Los Angeles Philharmonic in original scores for films and other compositions, co-wrote the song "Shakin'" with Eddie Money, for which she received (in 2006) a "Millionair" award from BMI for one million air-plays. Her original score for David Rabe's "The Orphan" was published by Samuel French and her orchestration of Agnes de Mille's ballet "Texas Fourth" has been performed by the State Street Ballet Company.

Together with John Trivers and Alan Pasqua, Myers co-wrote the orchestral theme for the CBS Evening News broadcast nightly on CBS. This newscast was originally anchored by Dan Rather, later by Scott Pelley, and most recently by Norah O'Donnell. The Trivers-Myers-Pasqua theme music continues to be part of the sonic landscape that brands the sound of CBS's respected nightly news broadcast and reinforces the legacy of solid journalism that is a cornerstone of CBS News.

As of 2024, Myers is teaching a "Composition for Commercials" extension course through the UCLA "Certificate of Film Scoring" program.

== Works ==
In 2000, Myers released a solo CD and book entitled "Le Rendez-Vous" (ISBN 0-9702394-0-8), published by Beautiful Babe Music and Books.

== Awards ==
In 2006 Myers received a Clio Award together with Trivers for their arrangement of Gershwin's "Rhapsody in Blue" for a United Airlines commercial entitled "Interview." They have also had numerous other commercial music scores receive awards, such as Golden Lions at Cannes, AICP Finalists, and Communication Arts awards.

- 1998, composer (with John Trivers and Jim Cox) of Best Western International ad "Manhattan". Clio Award certificate, Television/Cinema
- 1996, arranger/composer (with John Trivers) of Blue Cross / Blue Shield ad "The Delivery". Clio Award, TV/Cinema
- 2005, music for United Airlines "Interview". Clio Award, Television/Cinema, Bronze
- 1996, music for Glendale Federal Bank, "Building", "Trap Door", "Flower Pot". Clio Award, TV & Cinema, Silver
- 1995, music for Auto CD / Pioneer "Bridge". Clio Award, TV & Cinema, Gold
- 1995, music for Miller Lite "Elmer Bruker". Clio Award, TV & Cinema, Certificate
