= Stu Cook =

American bass player (born 1945)

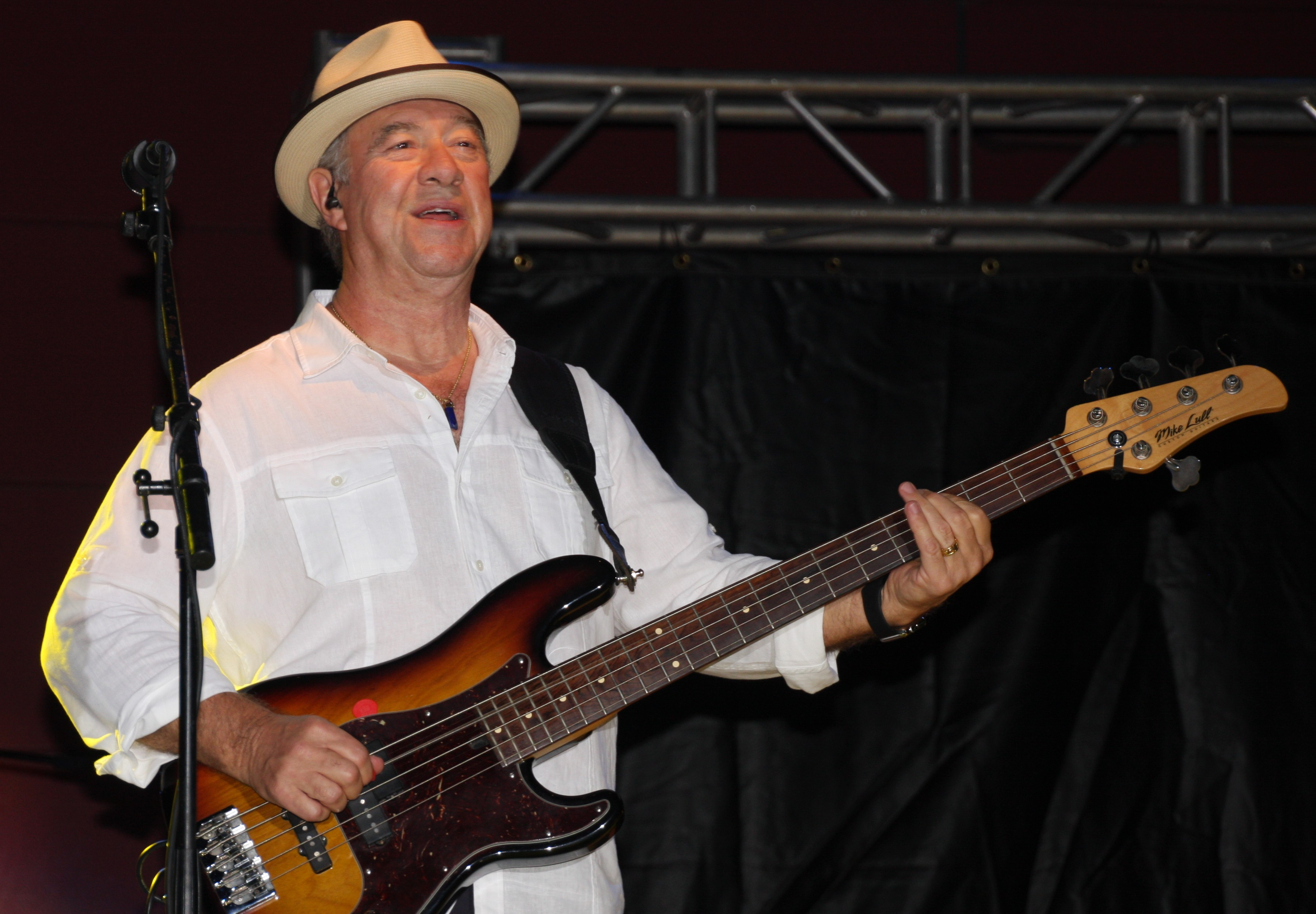
- Cook in 2016

Background information
- Born: Stuart Alden Cook; April 25, 1945 (age 81); Oakland, California, U.S.
- Genre: Rock
- Occupations: Musician, songwriter, producer
- Instruments: Bass guitar; guitar; piano; vocals; double bass
- Years active: 1959–2020
- Labels: Fuel 2000; Fantasy; Warner Bros.; Wounded Bird
- Formerly of: Creedence Clearwater Revival, Southern Pacific, Creedence Clearwater Revisited

Stuart Alden Cook (born April 25, 1945) is an American retired bass guitarist, best known as a founding member of the rock band Creedence Clearwater Revival (CCR), for which he is a member of the Rock and Roll Hall of Fame.

== Career ==
Cook, along with Doug Clifford and brothers Tom and John Fogerty, grew up in El Cerrito, California, where all four attended El Cerrito High School. Cook, Clifford and John Fogerty formed a band in high school which eventually became Creedence Clearwater Revival after Tom joined. Additionally, Cook attended San Jose State University alongside Doug Clifford.

In the mid-1970s, following the breakup of CCR, Cook and Clifford joined the Don Harrison Band, which released two albums.

In 1979, Cook produced 15 songs by Roky Erickson and the Aliens, which were released in 1980 on two LPs with different running orders, The Evil One and I Think of Demons.

From 1986 to 1991, Cook was a member of the country band Southern Pacific. With Southern Pacific, Cook covered the Erickson song "It's a Cold Night for Alligators" for the tribute album Where the Pyramid Meets the Eye: A Tribute to Roky Erickson.

Cook was inducted into the Rock and Roll Hall of Fame in 1993. Also in 1993, Cook auditioned for the role of the bassist in The Rolling Stones after the departure of Bill Wyman. Cook later reunited with Clifford, forming the band Creedence Clearwater Revisited in 1995.

== Discography ==
Don Harrison Band

- The Don Harrison Band (1976)
- Red Hot (1977)

Roky Erickson and the Aliens

- Roky Erickson and the Aliens (1980)
- The Evil One (1981)

Southern Pacific

- Killbilly Hill (1986)
- Zuma (1988)
- County Line (1990)
- Greatest Hits (1991)

Creedence Clearwater Revisited

- Recollection (1998)

Stu Cook / Keith Knudsen / John McFee

- Jackdawg (2009; recorded 1990)

Other appearances

| Year | Artist | Album | Comment | |
|---|---|---|---|---|
| 1972 | Mark Spoelstra | This House | Rhythm guitar | |
| 1972 | Doug Clifford | Cosmo | Rhythm guitar | |
| 1974 | Doug Sahm | Groover's Paradise | Bass | |
| 1974 | Tom Fogerty | Zephyr National | Bass | |
| 1974 | Tom Fogerty | Myopia | Bass | |
| 1978 | Russell DaShiell | Elevator | Bass | |
| 1981 | The Explosives | Three Ring Circus | Bass | Producer |
| 1982 | Baron Stewart | In Temperature Rising | Bass and producer | |
| 1983 | Sir Douglas Quintet | Midnight Sun | Bass | |
| 1985 | Greg Gumbel | California Republic | Bass, rhythm guitar, tambourine, backing vocals and producer | |
| 1994 | Sir Douglas Quintet | Day Dreaming at Midnight | Bass | |
| 1995 | Peter Lewis | Peter Lewis | Bass and producer | |
