= Doug Clifford =

American musician (born 1945)

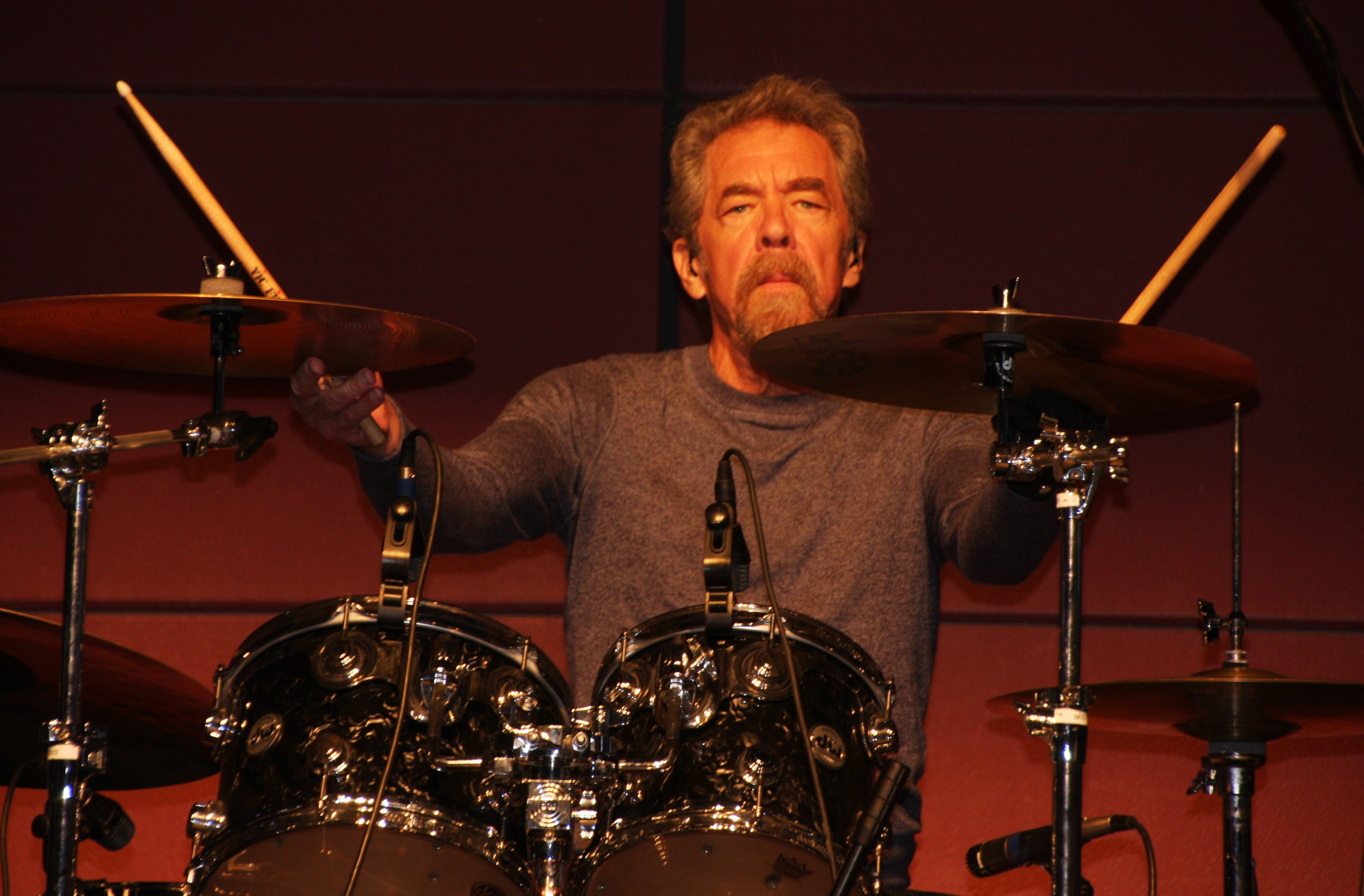
- Clifford performing with Creedence Clearwater Revisited in 2016

Background information
- Born: Douglas Raymond Clifford; April 24, 1945 (age 81); Palo Alto, California, U.S.
- Genre: Rock
- Occupations: Musician; songwriter
- Instruments: Drums; vocals; washboard
- Years active: 1959–present
- Labels: Fuel 2000; Fantasy Records
- Formerly of: Creedence Clearwater Revival; The Don Harrison Band; Creedence Clearwater Revisited
- Website: https://dougcosmoclifford.com/

Douglas Raymond "Cosmo" Clifford (born April 24, 1945) is an American musician and drummer. He is best known as a founding member of Creedence Clearwater Revival for which he was inducted into the Rock and Roll Hall of Fame in 1993. After the group disbanded in late 1972, Clifford released a solo album and later joined CCR bassist Stu Cook in the Don Harrison Band. In 1995, Clifford and Cook formed the band Creedence Clearwater Revisited, performing live versions of Creedence Clearwater Revival songs, although the group has not performed live since 2020.

An early influence on Clifford's playing was The Beatles, with their appearance on The Ed Sullivan Show in February 1964 being of particular significance. "They were a quartet and we said, wow, we can do that. If these guys from England can come out and play rock 'n' roll, we can do it. We bought Beatle wigs. We went to the drama store, and I guess they were The Three Stooges wigs at that time." Clifford, Cook, and the Fogerty brothers grew up together in El Cerrito, California. Clifford attended San Jose State University alongside Stu Cook. Clifford has houses in Scottsdale, Arizona and Reno, Nevada.

In 2024, Clifford's son, Brent, was arrested in connection with a homicide in Nevada and missing persons case in California.

== Discography ==
- Cosmo (1972)
- Magic Window (2020)

The Don Harrison Band

- The Don Harrison Band (1976)
- Red Hot (1977)

Creedence Clearwater Revisited

- Recollection (1998)

Clifford/Wright

- For All The Money In The World (2021)

Other

Year	Artist	Album	Comment
1972	Mark Spoelstra	This House	Drums
1974	Doug Sahm	Groover's Paradise	Producer and drums
1974	Tom Fogerty	Zephyr National	Drums, vocals
1974	Tom Fogerty	Myopia	Percussion, drums
1978	Russell DaShiell	Elevator	Drums
1979	Bob Whitlock, David Vega	California Gold	Drums
1981	Tom Fogerty	Deal It Out	co-writer of "Champagne Love"
1983	Sir Douglas Quintet	Midnight Sun	Drums
1989	Greg Kihn	UnKIHNtrollable	Drums on four tracks
1994	Sir Douglas Quintet	Day Dreaming at Midnight	Producer, drums and co-writer of ""Twisted World", "Into the Night" and "Freedom Is Mine"
1994	Steve Miller	Steve Miller Band Box Set	Drums on "Rock N'Me" (recorded live in 1975)
2003	John Tristao	Big Hat, No Cattle	co-writer of "Wake Up Call", "A Million Things" and "On Our Way"
2004	The Smithereens	From Jersey It Came! The Smithereens Anthology	Drums, percussion on "Downbound Train" (recorded in 1998)
2008	Billy C. Farlow	Billy C. and the Sunshine/The Lost 70's Tapes	Drums (recorded in 1976)
