= Tom Fogerty =

American musician (1941–1990)

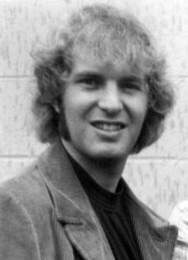
- Fogerty in 1968

Background information
- Also known as: Rann Wild
- Born: Thomas Richard Fogerty; November 9, 1941; Berkeley, California, U.S.
- Died: September 6, 1990 (aged 48) Scottsdale, Arizona, U.S.
- Genre: Rock
- Occupations: Musician; songwriter
- Instruments: Guitar; vocals
- Years active: 1959–1988
- Labels: Fantasy; PBR
- Formerly of: Creedence Clearwater Revival; Ruby
- Relatives: John Fogerty (brother)

Thomas Richard Fogerty (November 9, 1941 – September 6, 1990) was an American musician, best known as the rhythm guitarist for Creedence Clearwater Revival. He was posthumously inducted into the Rock and Roll Hall of Fame in 1993.

== Early life ==
Fogerty was born in Berkeley, California, one of five sons in a family of Irish descent. He grew up in nearby El Cerrito and attended Saint Mary's College High School in Berkeley, where he played on the football team. He also began singing rock and roll music with the Playboys, who played high school dances, his signature song being Bobby Freeman's "Do You Want to Dance." This attracted the attention of Spider Webb and the Insects, a top local group, who asked him to join. In 1959, the group signed a recording contract with Del-Fi Records shortly after Fogerty graduated from high school, but the group dissolved later that year, their single "Lyda Jane" never seeing release.

== Career ==
=== Creedence Clearwater Revival ===
After the breakup of Spider Webb and the Insects, Tom began performing as a solo artist. Tom's younger brother John had his own band, the Blue Velvets, who began backing Tom, and Tom later joined the band. Tommy Fogerty & the Blue Velvets recorded three singles, with Tom on lead vocals, for Orchestra Records in 1961 and 1962. During this era, Tom sometimes used the pseudonym "Rann Wild" for songwriting credits while John used "Toby Green". By 1964, the group had signed with Fantasy Records, who renamed the band the Golliwogs, with Tom and John sharing lead vocal duties. In 1967, John quit his job with the Pacific Gas and Electric Company, adding his savings to the collective pool of funds used to keep the band afloat. That same year, the band was redubbed Creedence Clearwater Revival, with John as the lead singer and sole songwriter, prompting Tom to begin improving his rudimentary guitar skills.

Although Tom's Golliwogs-era collaboration with John, "Walk on the Water", appeared on CCR's debut album, the subsequent lack of vocal and songwriting opportunities, compounded by longstanding animosity toward his brother, led Tom to leave the band in early 1971 after the completion of Pendulum. Though the band's press release characterized the split as amicable, Tom was frustrated by his brother's monopolization of the group's creativity and decision-making, lamenting that he simply became "just the guy who stood there and played rhythm guitar. So after we were into our sixth platinum album, I thought maybe I could do a little singing. But John was not going to change things, so I split."

=== Solo career ===
Fogerty in 1975

After leaving CCR, Fogerty began a solo career. His debut release, the April 1971 single "Goodbye Media Man" did not chart on the Billboard Hot 100, though it reached No. 3 on the Bubbling Under chart and No. 93 on the Cash Box singles chart. Robert Christgau of The Village Voice disliked the song, calling it "unextraordinary musically, simplistic lyrically, and also Tom doesn't sing too good". His May 1972 debut album, Tom Fogerty, reached No. 180 on the Billboard 200 chart.

In 1971 and 1972 Fogerty played rhythm guitar in the Saunders-Garcia band, mostly in Bay Area clubs, and Jerry Garcia and Merl Saunders played on Fogerty's follow-up album, Excalibur. Fogerty's former CCR bandmates Stu Cook and Doug Clifford performed on the 1974 follow-up album, Zephyr National, which spawned the single "Joyful Resurrection", which reached No. 84 on the Cash Box singles chart. "Mystic Isle Avalon" was the last recording to feature all four former CCR members, though John Fogerty recorded his lead guitar separately. Cook and Clifford also backed Fogerty on his fourth LP, 1974's Myopia.

Throughout the rest of the 1970s and 1980s, Fogerty continued to record as both a solo artist and as a member of Ruby. At his October 1980 wedding reception, all four members of CCR reunited and performed for the first time in a decade. They took the stage for the final time at a school reunion three years later. Fogerty's final project was the album Sidekicks, recorded in 1988 with Ruby bandmate Randy Oda, though not released until 1992.

== Personal life and death ==
At the age of 18, Fogerty married his high school sweetheart Gail Skinner, and they had four children before divorcing. In 1980, he married Tricia Clapper, and they settled in Scottsdale, Arizona, where Fogerty died of tuberculosis on September 6, 1990. In the time leading up to his death, Fogerty had AIDS, which his family believed he contracted from a blood transfusion he received while undergoing back surgery. He had six children.

From Tom's departure from the band in 1971 until his death, his relationship with his brother John was strained, woven into the complex legal and personal battles that John had with Fantasy Records owner Saul Zaentz. Tom's continued association with Zaentz, and even taking his side in lawsuits, business disputes, and retrospective analyses of the band's difficulties, led to an irreconcilable impasse in their relationship. According to John's autobiography, Fortunate Son, he visited Tom several times shortly before his death, though they only barely reconciled during John's final visit. John later eulogized him at his funeral, saying, "We didn't want to conquer Wall Street or take over nations. We wanted to grow up and be musicians. I guess we achieved half of that, becoming rock and roll stars. We didn't necessarily grow up."

== Discography ==
- Tom Fogerty (1972)
- Excalibur (1972)
- Zephyr National (1974)
- Myopia (1974)
- Deal It Out (1981)
- Sidekicks (with Randy Oda) (1992)
- The Very Best of Tom Fogerty (1999)

with Ruby

- Ruby (1977)
- Rock & Roll Madness (1978)
- Precious Gems (1984)

with other artists

- Heavy Turbulence – Merl Saunders (1972)
- Fire Up – Merl Saunders (1973)
- Garcia Live Volume 22 – Jerry Garcia and Merl Saunders (2026)
