= List of cover versions of Jacques Brel songs =

List of covers of songs by Belgian entertainer Jacques Brel

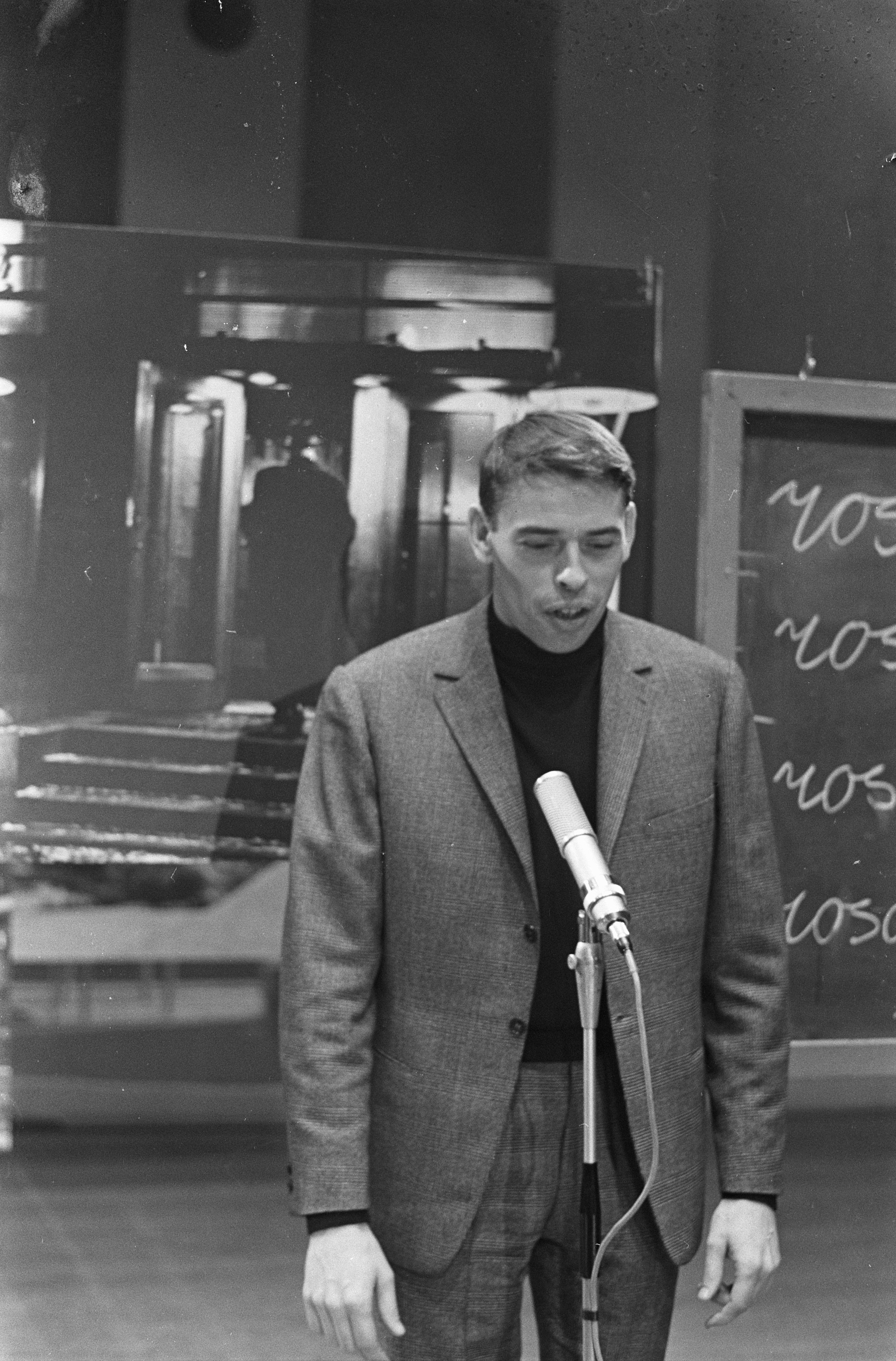
Brel performing in 1963

The following is a list of cover versions of Jacques Brel songs arranged alphabetically by artist. Songs written by Jacques Brel but never recorded by Brel himself are indicated by an asterisk.

== 0-9 ==
3JS

- "Liefde van later", single (2007)

4Walls

- "Ces gens-là", from the album Which Side Are You On (2004)

== A ==
Acda en De Munnik

- "De stad Amsterdam" ("Amsterdam"), from the album Acda en de Munnik (1997)
- "La valse à mille temps", from the album Zwerf (1997)

Ciara Adams

- "Ne me quitte pas", from the album Ciara Adams Live at Le Sélect Bistro (2005)

Adamo

- "Ne me quitte pas"

Alireza Tehrani

- "If You Go Away / اگه تو بری" ("Ne me quitte pas"), Single track (2021)

Karen Akers

- "Chanson des vieux amants", from the album Under Paris Skies (1996)
- "If We Only Have Love" ("Quand on n'a que l'amour"), from the album If We Only Have Love (2004)

Nishito Akiko

- "If You Go Away" ("Ne me quitte pas"), from the album If You Go Away (2007)

Alcione

- "Ne me quitte pas", from the album Um Barzinho, Um Violão Live (disc 4)

Haris Alexiou

- "Ne me quitte pas", from the album Live – Girizontas Ton Kosmo

Corinne Allal

- "Amsterdam", from the album Forbidden Fruits (1987)

Karrin Allyson

- "If You Go Away" ("Ne me quitte pas"), from the album From Paris to Rio (1999)

Marc Almond

- "The Bulls" ("Les toros"), from the album Torment and Toreros by Marc and the Mambas (1983)
- "If You Go Away" ("Ne me quitte pas"), from the album Untitled by Marc and the Mambas (1982)
- "The Devil (Okay)" ("Le diable (Ça va)"), "If You Need" ("S'il te faut"), "The Lockman" ("L’éclusier"), "We Must Look" ("Il nous faut regarder"), "Alone" ("Seul"), "I'm Coming" ("J'arrive"), "Litany for a Return" ("Litanies pour un retour"), "If You Go Away" ("Ne me quitte pas"), "The Town Fell Asleep" ("La ville s'endormait"), "The Bulls" ("Les toros"), "Never to be Next" ("Au suivant"), "My Death" ("La mort"), from the album Jacques (1989)
- "Jacky", single (1991)

Ambulette

- "If You Go Away", from the album The Lottery (2006)

Thierry Amiel

- "Quand on n'a que l'amour", "Amsterdam", from the album Paradoxes (2003)

Ange

- "Ces gens-là", from the album Le cimetière des arlequins (1971)
- "Le moribond", "À jeun", from the album A propos de... (1982)

Angélica María

- "No me dejes" ("Ne me quitte pas"), from the album Ellas cantan asi

Dick Annegarn

- "Jef", from the album Au suivant (2003)

Richard Anthony

- "Les vieux", from the album Hommage: Ils chantent Jacques Brel (1998)

Jenny Arean

- "Ik hield van" ("J'aimais"), "De namen van Parijs" ("Les prénoms de Paris"), "Kinderen van" ("Fils de"), from the album Hommage aan Jacques Brel (1974)
- "Kinderen van" ("Fils de"), from the album Jenny Arean (1986)
- "Delfzijl" ("Vesoul"), from the album Voorwaarts en niet vergeten (1999)

Paul Armfield

- "Why Should It Be that a Man Gets Bored" ("Pourquoi-faut il que les hommes s'ennuient"), from the album Songs Without Words (2004)

Arno

- "Le Bon Dieu", from the album A la française (1995)
- "La la la", from the album Au suivant (2003)
- "Voir un ami pleurer", from the album French bazaar (2004)

Arthur H.

- "Sur la place", from the album Au suivant (2003)

Sandy Aruba

- "Ne me quitte pas" (3 versions), 12-inch single (1997)

== B ==
Pierre Bachelet

- "La quête", "Madeleine", "Le plat pays", "La chanson des vieux amants", "Voir un ami pleurer", "Heureux", "La Fanette", "Orly", "Ne me quitte pas", "Quand on n'a que l'amour", "Le Bon Dieu", from the album Tu ne nous quittes pas (2005)

Joan Baez

- "The Dove" ("La colombe"), from the album Joan (1967)

Roy Bailey

- "Les timides", from the album Ne me quitte pas: Brel songs by... (1998)

Marco Bakker

- "Liefde van later" ("La chanson des vieux amants"), from the album Marco Bakker zingt romantische sfeersongs (1981)

Michael Ball

- "If You Go Away" ("Ne me quitte pas"), from the album Songs of Love (2001)

Yossi Banai

- "Ahava bat 20" ("La chanson des vieux amants"), from the album A Gypsy Face (1972)
- "HaMatilda Sjeli" ("Mathilde"), from the album Shikkor velo miyayin (1990)
- "Bisjviel tipa shel chesed" ("La tendresse"), "Al tilchi mikan" ("Ne me quitte pas"), "Banim" ("Fils de..."), "Ha'iesj mehagaz" ("Le gaz"), "Hagoses" ("Le moribund"), "Loe hajiti elohiem" ("Le Bon Dieu"), "Habet hetev jaldie habet hetev" ("Regarde bien petit"), "Kesjehajiti soes" ("Le cheval"), "Lo sjochechiem davar" ("On n'oublie rien"), "Bonboniem" ("Les bonbons"), "Jesj gevoel" ("Vesoul"), "Im neda' le'ehow" ("Quand on n'a que l'amour"), from the album Im neda' le'ehow - Songs of Jacques Brel (1992)

Barbara

- "Les Flamandes", "Je ne sais pas", "Voici", "Seul", "Sur la place", "Ne me quitte pas", "Il nous faut regarder", "Le fou du roi", "Litanies pour un retour", from the album Barbara chante Brel (1961)

Attila Bardóczy

- "Amsterdam", "Les toros", from the album Chanson classique (1996)

Steve Barton

- "Jackie", "The Port of Amsterdam" ("Amsterdam"), "If You Go Away" ("Ne me quitte pas"), from the album Only for a While (2009)

Bashung

- "Le tango funèbre", from the album Aux suivants (2003)

Shirley Bassey

- "If You Go Away" ("Ne me quitte pas"), from the album And We Were Lovers (1967)
- "If We Only Have Love" ("Quand on n'a que l'amour"), from the album And I Love You So (1972)
- "If You Go Away" ("Ne me quitte pas"), from the album The Remix Album...Diamonds Are Forever (2000)

Franco Battiato

- "La canzone dei vecchi amanti" ("La chanson des vieux amants"), from the album Fleurs (1999)

Martine Baujoud

- "Hé! m'man", EP (1967)

BCN

- "Jackie", from the album A Tribute to Scott Walker (2006)

Angelique Beauvence

- "La chanson des vieux amants", "Ne me quitte pas", from the album Still... Love You (2004)

Beirut

- "Le Moribond", from the album Elephant Gun (2007)

Bellowhead

- "Amsterdam", from the album Hedonism (2010)

Oscar Benton

- "If You Go Away" ("Ne me quitte pas"), single (1984)

Herman van den Berg

- "Die Sterwende" ("Le Moribond"), "Drinklied" ("La Bière"), "Die Grysaards" ("Les Vieux"), "My Lae Land" ("Le Plat Pays"), "Jojo", "Amsterdam", "My Kinderdae" ("Mon Enfance"), "Om Met Liefde Alleen" ("Quand On Ná Que l'Amour"), "Vlamingvrou" ("Les Flamandes"), "Sneeu Oor Luik" ("Il Neige Sur Liège"), "Die Bedeesdes" ("Les Timides"), "Die Lied Van Die Ou Minnaars" ("La Chanson Dex Vieux Amants"), "Die Goeie God" ("Le Bon Dieu"), from the album Brel In Afrikaans (2007)
- "Marieke", "Mathilde", "Laat My By Jou Bly" ("Ne Me Quitte Pas"), "Orly", "Nuwe Liefde" ("Le Prochain Amour"), "Tot Mens 'n Vriend Sien Huil" ("Voir Un Ami Pleurer"), "Die Stad Sluimer In" ("La Ville s'Endomait"), "Smeekbedes Vir 'n Terugkeer" ("Litanies Pour Un Retour"), "Die Wanhopiges" ("Les Désespérés"), "Die Marquises" ("Les Marquises"), "Fernand", from the album Brel In Afrikaans II (2011)

Paloma Berganza

- "La chanson des vieux amants", "Ne me quitte pas", "La valse à mille temps", from the album Avec le temps (2002)

Gérard Berliner

- "Mathilde", from the album Hommage - Ils chantent Jacques Brel (1998)

Dave Berry

- "Amsterdam", from the album Ne me quitte pas: Brel songs by... (1998)

Masha Bijlsma Band

- "La chanson des vieux amants", from the album Profile (1998)

Bic Runga

- "Ne me quitte pas", from the album Live in Concert (2006)

Bik Bent Braam

- "Ne me quitte pas", from the album 13 (2001)

Acker Bilk

- "If You Go Away" ("Ne me quitte pas"), from the album His Clarinet & Strings (1972)

Maria Bill

- "De Burgerij" (Les bourgeois), "Marieke", "Fernand", "Ne me quitte pas", "A jeun", "Amsterdam", "Pardons", "Le moribond", "La chanson de Jacky", "Le diable [Ça va]", "Madeleine", "Voir un ami pleurer", "Jef", "La chanson des vieux amants", "La valse à mille temps", "Les remparts de Varsovie", "Litanies pour un retour", "Mathilde", "Quand on n'a que l'amour", from the album Maria Bill singt Jacques Brel (2001)
- "Geliebter" ("Mathilde"), from the album Superstars singen Jacques Brel (2006)

Black Box Recorder

- "Seasons in the Sun" ("Le moribond"), from the album The Worst of Black Box Recorder (2003)

Blink 182

- "Seasons in the Sun" ("Le moribond")

Karin Bloemen

- "Nuttelozen van de nacht" ("Les paumés du petit matin"), from the album Het zou toch moeten bestaan (2002)

Frida Boccara

- "Bruxelles", from the album Festival (1962)
- "Ne me quitte pas", from the album Frida Boccara Sings (1967); Made in USSR; Place des Arts - Montreal '71 Live (1971); An Evening With Frida Boccara (1978); Live at Dallas Brooks Hall
- "Amsterdam", from the album An Evening with Frida Boccara (1978)
- "La Quête", from the album Place des Arts - Montreal '71 Live (1971)

Frank Boeijen

- "Een vriend zien huilen" ("Voir un ami pleurer"), from the album Live in Antwerpen (2004)

Deborah Boily

- "Ne me quitte pas", from the album Thank You for the Music (2004)

The Bolshoi

- "Amsterdam", single (1985)

Jeffry Bonnet

- "Ne me quitte pas", from the album Reflexion Refelexion (1986)
- "Een vriend zien huilen", from the album Bijna Beroemd (2007)
- "In de voetsporen van Brel", from the album Theaterprogramma (2006/2007)

Hans de Booij

- "De kathedraal" ("La cathédrale"), from the album Het beste van... (1987)
- "Marieke", from the album Vlaamse helden (1992)

Stef Bos

- "De laatste trein" ("Les désespérés"), from the album De onderstroom (1997)
- "Jef", from the album Zien (1999)

Miguel Bosé

- "Ne me quitte pas", from the album Once maneras de ponerse un sombrero (1998)

Della Bosiers

- "J'aimais", "Rosa", from the album Ode aan Jacques Brel concert (2003)

Hans Boskamp

- "De drinker" ("L'ivrogne")

Bots

- "Der Nächste" ("Au suivant"), from the album Schön krank (1983)
- "Wie volgt" (Au suivant; from the album 'Paradijs', 1990)

Botticelli

- "Seasons in the Sun" ("Le moribond"), from the album Midnight Moods (1989)

Isabelle Boulay

- "Amsterdam", from the album Scènes d'amour (1999)

David Bowie

- "My Death" ("La mort"), live recordings (1972, 1973)
- "Amsterdam", single B-side (1973)

Ted de Braak

- "Aju Publiek" ("Le moribond"), from the album Glaasje Madeira (1976)

James Dean Bradfield

- "To See a Friend in Tears" ("Voir un ami pleurer"), from the album The Great Western (2006)

Bruno Brel

- "Les Vieux", "Amsterdam", "Madeleine", "Les bourgeois", "Hé! m'man", "Mon père disait", "Fils de...", from the album Moitié Bruno moitié Brel (2001)

Corry Brokken

- "Een wals uit duizenden" ("La valse à mille temps"), single B-side (1960)

Patrick Bruel

- "Jef", from the album Bruel Tour 90-91 (1991)

Joke Bruijs

- "Moe nie weggaan nie" ("Ne me quitte pas"), from the album Ode aan Jacques Brel live concert (2003)

Yuri Buenaventura

- "Ne me quitte pas", from the album Herencia Africana (1996)
- "Les vieux amants", from the album Paroles (2016)

== C ==
Franco Califano

- "Ne me quitte pas", from the album Non escludo ilritorno (2005)

Chantal Câlin

- "La chanson des vieux amants", from the album Van Piaf tot Câlin
- "Amsterdam", from the album Van Piaf tot Câlin
- "Je m'en remets à toi", from the album Hommage à Piaf

Camden

- "De burgerij" ("Les bourgeois"), from the album Puur Brel (2003)

Glen Campbell

- "If You Go Away" ("Ne me quitte pas"), from the album Wichita Lineman (1968)

Donald Cant

- "If You Go Away" ("Ne me quitte pas"), "Amsterdam", "Brussels", "Marieke", "Old Folks" ("Les Vieux"), "Jackie" ("La chanson de Jacky"), "Desperate Ones" ("Les désespérés"), "My Death" ("La mort"), "Next" ("Au suivant"), "Fanette", "Carousel" ("La valse à mille temps"), "If We Only Have Love" ("Quand on n'a que l'amour"), from the album Cant / Brel (1999)

Lana Cantrell

- "If You Go Away" ("Ne me quitte pas"), from the album And Then There Was Lana (1967) and Lana Cantrell (1998)

Caravelli

- "Ne me quitte pas", from the album Douce France (1988)

Caribbean Steel Band

- "Seasons in the Sun" ("Le moribund"), from the album Caribbean Holiday (2003)

Belinda Carlisle

- "Ne me quitte pas", from the album Voila (2007)

Carlos do Carmo

- "La valse a mille temps", from the album Álbum (1980)

José Carreras

- "La chanson des vieux amants", from the album Energia (2004)

Rossana Casale

- "Non so perché" ("Je ne sais pas"), "Vesoul", "Se c'è solo l'amore" ("Quand on n'a que l'amour"), "Tango funebre" ("Le tango funèbre"), "La canzone dei vecchi amanti" ("La chanson des vieux amants"), "I cuori teneri" ("Les coeurs tendres"), "La mia infanzia" ("Mon enfance"), "Zangra", "Isabelle", "Le Fiamminghe" ("Les Flamandes"), "Non andare via" ("Ne me quitte pas"), "La città già dormiva" ("La ville s'endormait"), from the album Jacques Brel in Me (1999)

France Castel

- "Les désespérés", from the album Brel Québec (1993)

Koen de Cauter

- "Le plat pays", from the album Ne me quitte pas: Brel songs by... (1998)

Les Cavaliers

- "Amsterdam", from the album Les cavaliers: trubaduuriyhtye (1987)

Jean-Paul Celea & François Couturier

- "Ne me quitte pas", from the album Passaggio (1990)

The Centimeters

- "Next", from the album The Centimeters (2001)

Jonatan Cerrada

- "Ne me quitte pas"

Claude Challe

- "Ne me quitte pas", from the album Lover Dose (2000)

Chantal Chamberland

- "Ne me quitte pas", from the album Serendipity Street (2006)

Ray Charles

- "If You Go Away" ("Ne me quitte pas"), from the album Come Live with Me (1974)

Fay Claassen

- "If You Go Away" ("Ne me quitte pas"), from the album Rhythms & Rhymes (2002)

Alan Clayson

- "Sons of" ("Fils de"), "Next" ("Au suivant"), from the album Ne me quitte pas: Brel songs by... (1998)

Julien Clerc

- "La quête"

Les Cochabamba

- "Ne me quiite pas", from the album Flute Mania (1992)

Judy Collins

- "The Dove" ("La colombe"), from the album In my life (1966)
- "Chanson des vieux amants", from the album Wildflowers (1967)
- "Marieke", from the album Whales & Nightingales (1970)
- "Sons of" ("Fils de"), from the album Colors of the Day (1972)

Les Compagnons de la chanson

- "Ne me quitte pas"

Ray Conniff Singers

- "If We Only Have Love" ("Quand on n'a que l'amour"), from the album You Are the Sunshine of my Life (1973)

Ernesto Cortazar

- "Ne me quitte pas"

Sam Cooke

- "I Belong to Your Heart" ("Quand on n'a que l'amour"), single (1960)

Frank Cools

- "Laat me niet alleen" ("Ne me quitte pas"), "Vlaamse vrouwen" ("Les Flamandes"), "De burgerij" ("Les bourgeois"), "De prille liefde" ("Le prochain amour"), "Snoepgoed" ("Les bonbons"), "En wie volgt!" ("Au suivant"), "De oudjes" ("Les Vieux"), "De drinker" ("L'ivrogne"), "Orly", "Mathilde", "Heel mijn jeugd" ("Mon enfance"), "Rosa, Kinderen van..." ("Fils de..."), "Jef", "Straks komt mama thuis" ("Quand maman reviendra"), "Het bier" ("La bière"), from the album Frank Cools zingt Jacques Brel (1995)

Vera Coomans

- "La chanson des vieux amants", from the album Ne me quitte pas: Brel songs by... (1998)

Costa Cordalis

- "Ne me quitte pas", from the album Der Vorhang geht auf (1995)

Debbie de Coudreaux

- "La chanson des vieux amants", from the album Have a Little Paris on Me (2003)

Mary Coughlan

- "Hearts" ("Les coeurs tendres"), from the album Sentimental Killer (1992)

Ben Cramer

- "Liefde van later" ("La chanson des vieux amants"), from the album Als de avond valt (1983)

Les Croquants

- "La chanson de Jacky", "Le moribond", from the album Reprise (2004)

Arie Cupé

- "De oudjes" ("Les Vieux"), from the album Ode aan Jacques Brel (2003)

== D ==
Dalida

- "Non andare via" ("Ne me quitte pas")
- "Quand on n'a que l'amour", from the album Palais des Sports (1980)

Damita Jo

- "If You Go Away" ("Ne me quitte pas"), from the album Damita Jo sings (1965)

Jean-Louis Daulne

- "Vesoul", from the album Onomatopoïa (1996)

Emma Daumas

- "Ne me quitte pas"

George Davidson

- "Ne me quitte pas", from the album Somewhere in my Heart (1995)

Dawn

- "Ne me quitte pas", from the album Guitar & Vocals (2004)

Hamed Daye

- "Ne me quitte pas", from the album L'Hip-Hopee (2000)

Dead Belgian

- "Madeleine","Au Suivant", "Ne Me Quitte Pas", "La Haine", "Amsterdam", "Les Bourgeois", "Le Moribond", "Jacky", "Jaures", "My Death", from the album Love & Death: The Songs of Jacques Brel (2012)

Dee Dee Bridgewater

- "Ne me quitte pas", from the album J'ai Deux Amours (2005)

Deishovida

- "Ne me quitte pas", from the album Not 4 you (2000)

Michel Delpech

- "Ces gens-là", from the album Hommage: Ils chantent Jacques Brel (1998)

John Denver

- "Amsterdam", from the album Take Me to Tomorrow (1971) and An Evening with John Denver (2001)

Wouter Deprez

- "Meug nie weggoan nie" ("Ne me quitte pas")

Janez Detd.

- "Ne me quitte pas", from the album Puur Brel (2003)

Neil Diamond

- "If You Go Away" ("Ne me quitte pas"), from the album Stones (1971)

Renato Dibi

- "Amsterdam", "Lombardia" ("Le plat pays"), "Insieme a te Marieke" ("Marieke"), "Non andare via" ("Ne me quitte pas"), "Le Paolotte" ("Les Flamandes"), "Amsterdam", "I vecchi" ("Les Vieux"), "La canzone dei vecchi amanti" ("La chanson des vieux amants"), from the album Il mio Jacques Brel (1990)

Barbara Dickson

- "If You Go Away" ("Ne me quitte pas"), from the album The Right Moment (1986)

Dicte

- "If You Go Away" ("Ne me quitte pas"), from the album This is Cool (2000)

Marlene Dietrich

- "Bitte geh nicht fort" ("Ne me quitte pas") (1963)

De Dijk

- "De stad Amsterdam", from the album De blauwe schuit (1994)

Céline Dion

- "Un enfant", from the album Chants et contes de Noël (1983)
- "Quand on n'a que l'amour", from the album Celine Dion a l'Olympia (1994)

Sacha Distel

- "Les crocodiles", single (1962)

Divine Comedy

- "Jacky", from the album The Pop Singer's Fear of the Pollen Count (1999)

Dogstand

- "If You Go Away" ("Ne me quitte pas"), single (2006)

Sally Doherty

- "If You Go Away" ("Ne me quitte pas"), from the album A Tribute to Scott Walker (2006)

De Dopegezinde Gemeente

- "Burgerij" ("Les bourgeois"), from the album Ver van alles (1995)

Lia Dorana

- "Laat me niet alleen" ("Ne me quitte pas"), from the album Lia Dorana solo '68: een greep uit 10 jaar toneel en musical (1968)

Dragseth Duo

- "Gah nich wech vun mi" ("Ne me quitte pas"), from the album Soweit... (2010) and Lichtjahre (1991)
- "Mien platte land" ("Le plat pays"), from the album Soweit... (2010) and The Promised Shore (2006)

The Dresden Dolls

- "Amsterdam"

André van Duin

- "Liefde van later" ("La chanson des vieux amants"), from the album Recht uit het hart (1999)

Le Duo

- "Madeleine", "La valse à mille temps", "Ne me quitte pas", "La tendresse", "Le bon dieu", "Jef", "Isabelle", "Vesoul", "L'amour est mort", "La chanson des vieux amants", "La quête", "Amsterdam", "Les bourgeois", from the album Le Duo plays Jacques Brel (2006)

Charles Dumont

- "Je m'en remets à toi", from the album A faire l'amour sans amour (1964)

Elina Duni

- "Je ne sais pas", from the album Partir (2018)

Yves Duteil

- "La Fanette", from the album Hommage: Ils chantent Jacques Brel (1998)

Altemar Dutra

- "Se você partir" ("Ne me quitte pas"), from the album Altemar Dutra (1979)

== E ==
Sheena Easton

- "If You Go Away" ("Ne me quitte pas"), from the album No strings (1993)

Katja Ebstein

- "Mein flaches Land" ("Le plat pays"), from the album Superstars singen Jacques Brel (2006)

Stephan Eicher

- "Voir un ami pleurer", from the album Aux suivants (2003)

Philippe Elan

- "Mon enfance", "Voir un ami pleurer", "La Fanette", "Mathilde", from the album Démasqué (1992)
- "Les prénoms de Paris", "La Fanette", from the album Ode aan Jacques Brel (2003)

Shawn Elliott, Elly Stone, Mort Shuman, and Alice Whitfield

- "Marathon" ("Les Flamandes"), "Alone" ("Seul"), "Madeleine", "I Loved" ("J'aimais"), "Mathilde", "Bachelor's Dance" ("La bourrée du célibataire"), "Timid Frieda" ("Les timides"), "My death" ("La mort"), "Jackie", "Desperate Ones" ("Les désespérés"), "Amsterdam", "The Bulls" ("Les toros"), "Old Folks" ("Les Vieux"), "Marieke", "Brussels" ("Bruxelles"), "Fanette", "Funeral Tango" ("Tango funèbre"), "The Middle Class" ("Les bourgeois"), "You're Not Alone" ("Јеf"), "Next" ("Au suivant"), "Carousel" ("La valse à mille temps"), "If We Only Have Love" ("Quand on n'a que l'amour"), from the album Jacques Brel is Alive and Well and Living in Paris (1968)

Gunther Emmerlich

- "Einen Freund zu sehn, der weint" ("Voir un ami pleurer"), "Mein allerletztes Glas" ("Le dernier repas"), from the album Superstars singen Jacques Brel (2006)

Sergio Endrigo

- "Ti amo" ("Je t'aime"), single 1964)

Les Enfoirés

- "Ne me quitte pas", from the album Le train des Enfoirés (2005)

Été 67 (+ De Mens)

- "Een vriend zien huilen" ("Voir un ami pleurer"), from the album Été 67 (2007)

== F ==
Raimundo Fagner

- "Não me deixes mais" ("Ne me quitte pas"), from the album O Quinze (1989)

Marianne Faithfull

- "Ne me quitte pas", from the album Love in a mist (1988)
- "Port of Amsterdam", from the CD Brel. Ces gens là (2019)

Faudel

- "Ne me quitte pas", from the album Aux suivants (2003)

Female Factory

- "Een vriend zien huilen" ("Voir un ami pleurer"), from the album Live at the Royal Theatre Carre (1998)

Will Ferdy

- "Laat me niet alleen" ("Ne me quitte pas")
- "Vaarwel Emile" ("Le moribond"), single (1965)
- "Een wals van duizend tellen" ("La valse à mille temps"), "Amsterdam", "De stervende" ("Le moribond"), "Madeleine", "Men vergeet niets" ("On n'oublie rien"), "Zulke lui" ("Ces gens-là"), "Lied van de oude geliefden" ("Chanson des vieux amants"), "Het vlakke land" ("Le plat pays"), "De aanstaande liefde" ("Le prochain amour"), "Ik weet niet eens" ("Je ne sais pas"), "Zeg, als het eens waar was" ("Dites, si c'était vrai"), "Een kind" ("Un enfant"), "De duivel" ("Le diable"), "De pralinekes" ("Les bonbons"), "Met alleen maar de liefde" ("Quand on n'a que l'amour"), "Ga niet weg van mij" ("Ne me quitte pas"), from the album Will Ferdy zingt Jacques Brel

Jorge Fernando

- "La chanson des vieux amants", from the album Velho fado (2001)

Roberto Ferri

- "Ne me quitte pas", "Madeleine", "Le plat pays", "La valse à mille temps", from the album Marinelle et le chat (2001)

Evelyn Fischer

- "Wenn du von mir gehst" ("Ne me quitte pas"), from the album Superstars singen Jacques Brel (2006)

Marjol Flore

- "Les coeurs tendres", from the album Marjol Flore (1973)
- "Ich liebte" ("J'aimais"), from the album Ich leb (1984)
- "Les prénoms de Paris", "On n'oublie rien", "Amsterdam", from the album Lieder & chansons (1992)

Forrester

- "If You Go Away" ("Ne me quitte pas"), from the album Ne me quitte pas: Brel songs by... (1998)

The Fortunes

- "Seasons in the Sun" ("Le moribond", single (1968)

French B.

- "Ces gens-là", from the album Brel Québec (1993)

Kalle Freynik

- "Bitte geh nicht fort" ("Ne me quitte pas"), single (1967)

Gavin Friday

- "Next" ("Au suivant"), from the album Each Man Kills the Thing He Loves (1989)
- "Amsterdam"

Maria Friedman

- "If You Go Away" ("Ne me quitte pas"), from the album Now and then (2006)

René Froger

- "Liefde van later" ("La chanson des vieux amants"), from the album Sweet Hello's & Sad Goodbyes 2 (2002)

== G ==
Giorgio Gaber

- "I borghesi" ("Les bourgeois"), "Che bella gente" ("Ces gens-là"), "L'amico" ("Jef"), from the album I borghesi (1971)

Rita di Ghent

- "Ne me quitte pas", from the album The standards sessions 2 (2003)

Dori Ghezzi

- "Stagioni fuori tempo" ("Le moribond")

Bobby Goldsboro

- "If You Go Away" ("Ne me quitte pas"), from the album Word Pictures Featuring Autumn of My Life (1968)

Emil Gorovets

- "Не покинь меня" ("Ne me quitte pas"), recorded in 1970, Moscow, USSR. Published on album Антология советской песни 1970 (Antholology of soviet songs 1970)

Edyta Górniak

- "Nie opuszczaj mnie" ("Ne me quitte pas")

Goodbye Mr Mackenzie

- "Amsterdam", from the album Good Deeds and Dirty Rags (1999)

Gorki

- "De sluiswacht" ("L’éclusier"), from the album Puur Brel (2003)

Francis Goya & Damian Luca

- "If You Go Away" ("Ne me quitte pas"), from the album The Romantic Guitar & Magic Panflute (1988)

Juliette Gréco

- "Le diable (ça va)", EP (1952)
- "On n'oublie rien", EP (1961)
- "Vieille", EP (1964)
- "Je suis bien", from the album La femme (1967)
- "La chanson des vieux amants", from the album Face à face (1970)
- "Voir un ami pleurer", "J'arrive", from the album Juliette Gréco... (1977)
- "On n'oublie rien", "Le prochain amour", "Voir un ami pleurer", "Bruxelles", "Je suis bien", "La chanson des vieux amants", "J'arrive", "Le tango funèbre", "Regarde bien petit", "La valse à mille temps", "Ne me quitte pas", from the album Gréco 88: Hommage à Brel (1988)

Jacques Grillot

- "Le diable (ça va)", "Le dernier repas", "Les paumés du petit matin", "Amsterdam", "Les Marquises", "Mathilde", "Fernand", "Les timides", "Les bigotes", "La Fanette", "Les bourgeois", "Le diable", "Le tango funèbre", "Le moribond", "La chanson des vieux amants", "Bruxelles", "Jef", "La valse à mille temps", "Les Vieux", "Rosa", "Madeleine", from the album Jacques chante Brel (1997)

Raymond van het Groenewoud

- "Dat slag volk" ("Ces gens-là"), from the album Neem je tijd (1989)

Otto Groote Ensemble

- "Amsterdam", from the album De anner Steerns an d' Heven (2009)

Petru Guelfucci

- "Ma ti ne voli anda" ("Ne me quitte pas"), from the album Les plus belles chansons (2001)

Daniel Guichard

- "Ne me quitte pas", from the album La tendresse (1973)
- "Quand on n'a que l'amour", from the album Les plus belles chansons d'amour (1994)

Jean Guidoni

- "Vesoul", from the album Hommage: Ils chantent Jacques Brel (1998)

Inger Marie Gundersen

- "If You Go Away" ("Ne me quitte pas")

Rigmor Gustafsson

- "If You Go Away" ("Ne me quitte pas"), from the album I Will Wait for You (2003)

== H ==
Susanna Haavisto

- "Ala vetää vaan" ("Ne me quitte pas"), "Seuraava" ("Au suivant"), "Syntymässä säikähtäneet" ("Les timides"), from the album Laulusi elää, Brel I (1984)
- "Härät" ("Les toros"), "Jef", "Meikäläiset" ("Les Flamandes"), "Viimeinen valssi" ("La valse à mille temps"), "Marieke", from the album Laulusi elää, Brel II (1986)

Johnny Hallyday

- "Ne me quitte pas", from the album En concert: Zenith 1984 (1984)

Frans Halsema

- "Madeleine", B-side single (1967)
- "Vrouwencafé" (1980)

Ester Hana

- "Ne me quitte pas", "Amsterdam", from the album Passport (2004)

Jon Harvison

- "Le moribond", from the album Ne me quitte pas: Brel songs by... (1998)

Micheline van Hautem

- "La chanson des vieux amants", from the album Brel op 1 (1998)
- "Een vriend zien huilen" ("Voir un ami pleurer"), from the album Live in Antwerpen (2004)

Richard Hayman

- "If You Go Away" ("Ne me quitte pas"), from the album An Evening in Paris (2000)

Douwe Heeringa en Compagnie

- "Mathilde", "It flakke lân" ("Le plat pays"), "Leafste bliuw by my" ("Ne me quitte pas"), "Mei de leafde yn it liif" ("Quand on n'a que l'amour"), "Utering" ("Litanies pour un retour"), "It gas" ("Le gaz"), "In eilan" ("Une île"), "Ik bin in simmerjun" ("Je suis un soir d'été"), "Berber" ("Isabelle"), "De dwazen fan e lette nacht" ("Les paumes du petit matin"), "Ien foar d'oar" ("Les amants de coeur"), "Fanette" ("La Fanette"), "Fertwiveling" ("Les désespérés"), "In sliepende sted" ("La ville s'endormait"), "Clara", "In freon dy't gult is oars" ("Voir un ami pleurer"), from the album Brel in Fries (1990)
- "Amsterdam", "L'enfance", "Zomernacht" ("Je suis un soir d'été"), "La chanson des vieux amants", "De nuttelozen van de nacht" ("Les paumés du petit matin"), "De radelozen" ("Les désespérés"), "Leafste bliuw by my" ("Ne me quitte pas"), "Dat soort volk" ("Ces gens-là"), "Il neige sur Liège", "Voir un ami pleurer", "Mei de leafde yn it liif" ("Quand on n'a que l'amour"), "Marieke", from the album Brel twa (2007)

Hana Hegerová

- "Lásko má" ("La chanson des vieux amants")
- "Lásko prokletá" ("Ne me quitte pas")

Harma Heikki

- "Amsterdam", from the album Yhtenä iltana (1990)

Rie Helmig

- "Laat me niet alleen" ("Ne me quitte pas")

Michael Heltau

- "Tango funèbre", "Franz" ("Fernand"), "Marieke", "Joe" ("La chanson de Jacky"), "Amsterdam", "Der Gasmann" ("Le gaz"), "Das Lied von der alten Liebe" ("La chanson des vieux amants"), "Die Bonbonnière" ("Les bonbons"), "Das Bier" ("La bière"), "Auch ich war einst ein Kind" ("Mon enfance"), "Die chancenlos sind" ("Les désespérés"), "Der Alte sagt" ("Mon père disait"), "Karussell" ("La valse à mille temps"), "Jojo", "Madame", "Schön", "Der Nächste" ("Au suivant"), "Der Besen", "Die Alten" ("Les vieux"), "Das allerletzte Glas" ("Le dernier repas"), "Wien" ("Vesoul"), from the album Best of Brel (2005)

André van den Heuvel

- "Het bier" ("La bière"), from the album Zwart-wit
- "Jef", "De dood" ("La mort"), "Madeleine", "Het standbeeld" ("La statue"), from the album Hommage aan Jacques Brel (1974)

Ivan Heylen

- "Jef", single (1982)

Al Hirt

- "If You Go Away" ("Ne me quitte pas"), from the album Greatest Hits (2000)

Klaus Hoffmann

- "Adieu Emile" ("Le moribond"), from the album Klaus Hoffmann (1975)
- "Geh nicht fort von mir" ("Ne me quitte pas"), from the album Was bleibt? (1976)
- "Mein Flanderland" ("Le plat pays"), "So sind hier die Leute" ("Ces gens-là"), from the album Ich will Gesang, will Spiel und Tanz (1977)
- "Allein" ("Seul"), from the album Ciao Bella (1983)
- "Bitte geh nicht fort" ("Ne me quitte pas"), "Amsterdam", "Jacky", "Jef", "Marieke", "Rosa", "Mathilde", "Der Walzer der tausend Takte" ("La valse à mille temps"), "Bei diesen Leuten", ("Ces gens-là"), "Knokke le Zoute", "Die Stadtmauer von Warschau" ("Les remparts de Varsovie"), "Der Säufer" ("L'ivrogne"), "Die ohne Hoffnung sind" ("Les désespérés"), "Wenn uns nur Liebe bleibt" ("Quand on n'a que l'amour"), "Die Alten" ("Les Vieux"), "Das Lied der alten Liebenden" ("Chanson des vieux amants"), from the album Klaus Hoffmann singt Brel (1997)
- "Der Kammerton", "Die Vornamen von Paris" ("Les prénoms de Paris"), "Rosa", "Bei diesen Leuten" ("Ces gens-là"), "Marieke", "Die Marquesas" ("Les Marquises"), "Mathilde", "Der Säufer" ("L'ivrogne"), "Der unmögliche Traum-Elegie", "Der Säufer" ("L'ivrogne"), "Die Alten" ("Les Vieux"), "Der unmögliche Traum-Elegie", "Knokke-le-Zoute Tango", "Amsterdam", "Madeleine", "Walzer der 1000 Takte" ("La valse à mille temps"), "Die Stadtmauern von Warschau" ("Les remparts de Varsovie"), "Der Kammerton", "Miche-Elegie", "Das Lied der alten Liebenden" ("La chanson des vieux amants"), "Der unmögliche Traum-Elegie", "Die ohne Hoffnung sind" ("Les désespérés"), "Der unmögliche Traum-Elegie 2", "Totentango" ("Le tango funèbre"), "Der unmögliche Traum", "Kampfthema", "Der unmögliche Traum", "Der Kammerton", "Flämischer Bauerntanz" ("Les Flamandes"), "Marquesas-Elegie" ("Les Marquises"), "Jacky", "Wenn uns nur Liebe bleibt" ("Quand on n'a que l'amour"), "Wenn uns nur Liebe bleibt: Reprise", "Der unmögliche Traum-Elegie", from the album Brel: Die letzte Vorstellung (1997)

Johan Hoogeboom

- "De nuttelozen van de nacht" ("Les paumés du petit matin"), from the album Ode aan Jacques Brel (2003)

Shirley Horn

- "If You Go Away" ("Ne me quitte pas"), May the music never end (2003)

Dominique Horwitz

- "Les paumés du petit matin", "Amsterdam", "La valse à mille temps", "La chanson de Jacky", "Les bonbons", "La chanson des vieux amants", "Mathilde", "Orly", "Les bourgeois", "Ne me quitte pas", "Le moribond", "Les Flamandes", "La Fanette", "Knocke Le Zoute-tango", "Jef", "Bruxelles", "La statue", "Madeleine", "Les singes", from the album Singt Jacques Brel (2000)

Karin Hougaard

- "If You Go Away" ("Ne me quitte pas"), "Seasons in the Sun" ("Le moribond"), "Marieke", "Liefde van later" ("La chanson des vieux amants"), "My open land" ("Le plat pays"), "Vriend sien huil" ("Voir un ami pleurer"), "If we only have love" ("Quand on n'a que l'amour"), from the album Metamorph 1999 (1999)

Engelbert Humperdinck

- "If we only have love", ("Quand on n'a que l'amour"), from the album Live in Concert / All of me (1991)

== I ==
Julio Iglesias

- "If You Go Away" ("Ne me quitte pas"), from the album Starry night (1990)

Jure Ivanušič

- "Hudič" ("Le Diable"), "Moramo gledati" ("Il Nous Faut Regarder"), "Naslednji" ("Au Suivant"), "Obupanci" ("Les Désespérés"), "Marieke", "Matilda", "Ne zapusti me" ("Ne me quitte pas"), "Nežnost" ("La Tendresse"), "Amsterdam", "Plašen človek" ("Les Timides"), "Zangra", "Okna" ("Les Fenêtres"), "Obešenec" ("Le Pendu"), "Sam" ("Seul")," Umirajoči" ("Le Moribond"), "Pada dež" ("Il Pleut"), from the album Srce v kovčku (2011) "Plin" ("Le Gaz"), "Lev" ("Le Lion"), from the album Sonce in sence (2016)

Hiromi Iwasaki

- "行かないで" ("Ne me quitte pas"), from the album Koibitotachi (1979)

== J ==
Terry Jacks

- "Seasons in the Sun" ("Le moribond"), single (1974)
- "If You Go Away" ("Ne me quitte pas"), single (1974)

Alfred Janson

- "Ne me quitte pas", from the album Spor.Sørland Selvportrett (2002)

Jocelyne Jocya

- "Ne me quitte pas", from the album French Feelings: Jocelyne Jocya in the USA (2003)

Robb Johnson

- "Le Bon Dieu", "Les bonbons", from the album Ne me quitte pas: Brel songs by... (1998)

Byron Jones

- "Fanette", "Ne me quitte pas", "Amsterdam", "If We Only Have Love" ("Quand on n'a que l'amour"), from the album What Have You Done to my Heart (2004)

Jack Jones

- "If You Go Away" ("Ne me quitte pas"), from the album Best of Jack Jones (1997)

Tom Jones

- "If You Go Away" ("Ne me quitte pas"), from the album Help Yourself (1968)

Jasperina de Jong

- "De oudjes" ("Les Vieux"), from the album Een tien voor Jasperien! (1969)

Ibrica Jusić

- "Amsterdam", from the album Jacques Brel: Stipica Kalogjera (1985)
- "Ne Me Quitte Pas", from the album Dan Prije», live in ZeKaeM (1998)
- "Nemoj Ići" ("Ne Me Quitte Pas"), EP (1970)
- Nemoj poći sad" ("Ne Me Quitte Pas"), from the album Jacques Brel: Ibrica Jusić (1974)

Freek de Jonge

- "Wie volgt?" ("Au suivant"), from the album De volgende (1991)
- "Lied van de oude geliefden" ("La chanson des vieux amants"), "Nuttelozen van de nacht" ("Les paumés du petit matin"), from the album Parlando (2003)

Filip Jordens

- "La valse à mille temps", "La Fanette", from the album Brel op 1 (1998)

Juanares

- "No me dejes" ("Ne me quitte pas"), from the album Chanson Flamenca (2005)

Barb Jungr

- "Ne me quitte pas", "Les Marquises", "Marieke", "La chanson des vieux amants", from the album Chanson: The Space in Between (2001)

== K ==
Patricia Kaas

- "If You Go Away" ("Ne me quitte pas"), from the album Piano bar (2002)
- "Quand on n'a que l'amour", from the album Toute la musique... (2005)

Kamahl

- "If we only have love" ("Quand on n'a que l'amour"), from the album Imagine: The World In Unison (2003)

Radmila Karaklajić

"Если ты уйдешь" (If You Go Away) (1973). The russian translation of "Ne me quitte pas"

Kent

- "Fils de...", from the album Aux suivants (2003)

The King's Singers

- "La valse à mille temps", from the album Chanson d'amour (1993)

The Kingston Trio

- "Seasons in the Sun" ("Le moribond"), single (1964)

Eartha Kitt

- "If You Go Away," live performance (1968)
- "Ne me quitte pas," from the album Live in London: 1989 2 (1991)

Hildegard Knef

- "Mein flaches Land" ("Le plat pays"), "Amsterdam". from Überall blühen Rosen (1978)

Steve Knightley

- "My death" ("La mort"), from the album Ne me quitte pas: Brel songs by... (1998)

Josee Koning

- "Liefde van later" ("La chanson des vieux amants"), from the album Verdonken vlinder: Josee Koning zingt Lennaert Nijgh (2005)

Elisabeth Kontomanou

- "Ne me quitte pas", from the album Hands & Incantation (2000)

Wim Koopmans

- "If You Go Away" ("Ne me quitte pas"), I'm a Singer (1994)

Tommy Körberg en Stefan Nilsson

- "Min barndom" ("Mon enfance"), "De skenheliga" ("Les bigotes"), "Zangra", "Det doftar öl" ("La bière"), "Du får inte gå" ("Ne me quitte pas"), "Amsterdam", "En flicka" ("Les biches"), "Vid Molins fontän" ("Les bourgeois"), "Visor utan ord" ("Chanson sans paroles"), from the album Tommy Körberg och Stefan Nilsson tolkar Jacques Brel (1982)

Rolinha Kross

- "Amsterdam", from the album Ode aan Jacques Brel (2003)

== L ==
Laïs

- "Grand Jacques", from the album Brel op 1 (1998)
- "Marieke", from the album Douce Victime (2004)

Serge Lama

- "J'arrive", "Le prochain amour", "Ne me quitte pas", "Les bourgeois", "Dors ma mie", "On n'oublie rien", "Il pleut", "La Fanette", "L'homme dans la cité", "Les biches", "Le plat pays", from the album Lama chante Brel (1979)

Fernando Lameirinhas

- "Le plat pays", from the album Fadeando (1999)

Ngọc Lan

- "Nguoi Yeu Neu Ra Di" ("Ne me quitte pas"), from the album Fadeando

Daniel Lang

- "Ne me quitte pas"

Simone Langlois

- "Ne me quitte pas" (1959)
- "Il nous faut regarder", "Un enfant", from the album 18 titres (1990)

Maurice Larcange

- "Ne me quitte pas", from the album Paris for Lovers (2005)

James Last

- "Seasons in the Sun" ("Le moribond"), from the album Liebe ist... (1989)
- "If You Go Away" ("Ne me quitte pas"), from the album Paris mon amour (1990)

Cyndi Lauper

- "If You Go Away", from the album At last (2003)

Olivier Laurent

- "Ne me quitte pas", "La chanson des vieux amants", "Quand on n'a que l'amour", "Les bonbons", "L'amour est mort", "La chanson de Jacky", "Au suivant", "Jef", "Le plat pays", "Mon père disait", "Amsterdam", "Ces gens-là", from the album Ces gens-là (2003)

Bruno Lauzi

- "Le bigotte" ("Les bigotes"), from the album Bruno Lauzi (1970)
- "Un bambino" ("Un enfant"), "I bonbons" ("Les bonbons"), from the album Il teatro di Bruno Lauzi (1972)

Jean-Sébastien Lavoie

- "La quête", from the album Je me souviendrai (2004)

Vicky Leandros

- "Pes mou pos bories" ("Ne me quitte pas"), from the album BIKY (1971)
- "Ne me quitte pas", from the album VICKY (1970)
- "Un Enfant", from the album Moege Der Himmel (2009)
- "Wie Ein Kind ("Un Enfant"), from the album Moege Der Himmel (2009)

Nara Leão

- "La colombe", from the album Coisas do mundo (1969)

Begijn le Bleu

- "Ga uw tieten pakken" ("Ne me quitte pas"), from the album De prins op het witte paard (2005)

Brenda Lee

- "If You Go Away", from the album Johnny One Time (1969)

Paul de Leeuw

- "Dat soort volk" ("Ces gens-là"), from the album Plugged (1993)
- "Een slapende stad" ("La ville s'endormait"), from the album Stille liedjes (2000)

Raymond Lefevre

- "Ne me quitte pas", from the album Les plus belles melodies Francais

Maxime LeForestier

- "La chanson des vieux amants", from the album Bataclan 1989 (1989)

Sylvie Legault

- "Quand on n’a que l’amour", from the album Brel Québec (1993)

Jo Lemaire

- "La quête", from the album Brel op 1 (1998)

Lemon

- "La chanson des vieux amants", from the album Puur Brel (2003)

Ute Lemper

- "Ne me quitte pas", "Amsterdam", from the album But One Day (2003)

Jan Leyers

- "Le dernier repas", from the album Puur Brel (2003)

Frank van der Linden

- "J'arrive", from the album Brel op 1 (1998)

Liesbeth List

- "Amsterdam", "Litanie bij een terugkeer" ("Litanies pour un retour"), "Mijn vlakke land" ("Le plat pays"), "De oudjes" ("Les Vieux"), "Dat soort volk" ("Ces gens-là"), "Alleen" ("Seul"), "Verlegen Frieda" ("Les timides"), "De radelozen" ("Les désespérés"), "Mijn vader zei" ("Mon père disait"), "Laat me niet alleen" ("Ne me quitte pas"), "Brussel" ("Bruxelles"), from the album Liesbeth List zingt Jacques Brel (1969)
- "Bitte, geh' nicht fort" ("Ne me quitte pas"), "Brüssel" ("Bruxelles"), "Mein flaches Land" ("Le plat pays"), from the album Liesbeth List (1970)
- "De merrie" ("Le cheval"), "Ik ben een zomernacht" ("Je suis un soir d'été"), "Rosa", "De drinker" ("L'ivrogne"), "Ne me quitte pas", "Oma" ("Grandmère"), "Le plat pays", "I'm not afraid" ("Fils de"), "Kijk nog eens goed m’n kind" ("Regarde bien, petit"), "La chanson des vieux amants", "De stier" ("Les toros"), "Een vriend zien huilen" ("Voir un ami pleurer"), from the album Liesbeth List zingt Jacques Brel 2 (2003)

Dani Litani

- "Benamal Amsterdam"

Charles Lloyd

- "Ne me quitte pas", from the album Jumping the Creek (2005)

Jack Lukeman & the Black Romantics

- "If We Only Have Love" ("Quand on n'a que l'amour"), "Jacky", "My Death" ("La mort"), "Lockman" ("L'éclusier"), "If You Go Away" ("Ne me quitte pas"), "Port of Amsterdam" ("Amsterdam"), "Un ami pleure" ("Voir un ami pleurer"), "The Devils" ("Le diable (Ça va)"), "Fannette" ("La Fanette"), from the album Wax (1995)

Vera Lynn

- "If we only have love" ("Quand on n'a que l'amour"), single (1972)

Kay Lyra

- "Ne me quitte pas", from the album Influencia do jazz (2004)

== M ==
M

- "Au suivant", from the album Aux suivants (2003)

Eileen Mager

- "Ne me quitte pas", from the album Classic French Songs (2001)

Flossie Malavialle

- "Amsterdam", "Le prochain amour", "Vesoul", "Quand on n'a que l'amour", "Ne me quitte pas", "La valse a mille temps", "Le palt pays", "Au suivant", "Les Vieux", "La chanson des vieux amants", from the album Flossie Sings Brel (2007)

Mama's Jasje

- "Vlakke land" ("Le plat pays"), from the album Hommages II (1998)

Manic Movement

- "Amsterdam", from the album Thousand Sufferings (1999)

Barry Manilow

- "If we only have love" ("Quand on n'a que l'amour"), from the album Showstoppers (1992)

Vera Mann

- In de schaduw van Brel (2004)

Rick Margitza

- "La chanson des vieux amants", from the album Conversations (1999)

Lena Martell

- "If We Only Have Love" ("Quand on n'a que l'amour"), from the album One Day at a Time: An Anthology of Song (2003)

Fabien Martin

- "Vesoul"

Maysa Matarazzo

- "Ne me quitte pas", from the album Canecão apresenta Maysa (1969)

Mireille Mathieu

- "Ne me quitte pas", from the album Les plus grands succès, vol.3
- "La quête", from the album Amoureusement vôtre (2002)
- "Quand on a que l'amour", from the album Mireille Mathieu à l'Olympia (2005)

Gisela May

- "Brüssel", "Die Stiere" ("Les toros"), "Lied von den alten Liebenden" ("Chanson des vieux amants"), "Karusell" ("La valse à mille temps"), "Begräbnistango" ("Le tango funèbre"), "Die Hirten" ("Les bergers"), "Mathilde", "Du bist dran" ("Au suivant"), "Fanette", "Die Schüchternen", "Die beste Freundin", "Die Chancenlosen", "Der Teufel" ("Le diable (Ça va)"), "Amsterdam", from the album Lieder von Jacques Brel (1998)

Rod McKuen

- "Come, Jef" ("Jef"), "If You Go Away" ("Ne me quitte pas"), "The Lovers", "Far West", "Zangra", "Songs Without Words" ("Chanson sans paroles"), "Port of Amsterdam" ("Amsterdam"), "I'm not afraid" ("Fils de"), "To you" ("Il neige sur Liège"), "The Statue" ("La statue"), "The Women" ("Les biches"), "Les bourgeois", "Les amants de coeur", "Season in the Sun" ("Le moribond"), from the album Sings Jacques Brel (1992)

Rob van de Meeberg

- In de schaduw van Brel (2004)

Me First and the Gimme Gimmes

- "Seasons in the Sun" ("Le moribond"), from the album Have a Ball (1997)

Tom Mega

- "Les Vieux", "Grand Jacques", from the album Brel (1992)

Marieann Meringolo

- "If We Only Have Love" ("Quand on n'a que l'amour"), from the album Imagine... If We Only Have Love (2003)

Helen Merril and Stan Getz

- "If You Go Away" ("Ne me quitte pas")

Jan Mesdag

- "Havenstad" ("Amsterdam"), "De radelozen" ("Les désespérés"), "Kinderen van" ("Fils de"), "Ik weet niet waarom" ("Je ne sais pas"), "De stad viel in slaap" ("La ville s'endormait"), "Voor wat tedere gebaren" ("La tendresse"), "Schiphol" ("Orly"), "Laat me niet alleen" ("Ne me quitte pas"), "Het huilen van een vriend" ("Voir un ami pleurer"), "Alleen" ("Seul"), "De prille liefde" ("Le prochain amour"), "Als er liefde bestaat" ("Quand on n'a que l'amour"), "Ik kom er aan" ("J'arrive"), "En opeens straalt het licht" ("La lumière jaillira"), from the album Zingt Brel (1988)

Metropole Orkest

- "La chanson des vieux amants", from the album Verzameld werk (2003)

Mich en Scène

- "J'arrive", "La chanson des vieux amants", "Pardons", "Marieke", "Mathilde", "Au suivant", "Les Vieux", "Ne me quitte pas", "Le diable (Ça va)", "Mijn vlakke land" ("Le plat pays"), "Bruxelles", "Voir un ami pleurer", "Les Marquises", "Le moribond", "La valse à mille temps", from the album Songs of Jacques Brel (2003)
- "De Markiezen" ("Les Marquises"), "Mathilde", "Laat me niet alleen" ("Ne me quitte pas"), "De duivel" ("Le diable (Ça va)"), "Amsterdam", from the album Zie Bronnen (2004)
- "Moenie weggaan nie" ("Ne me quitte pas"), from the album Madame (2005)

Milva

- "Ne me quitte pas", "Quand on n'a que l'amour", from the album La chanson française (2001)

Jean-Louis Millette

- "La chanson des vieux amants", from the album Brel Québec (1993)

Phil Minton

- "Song for old lovers" ("La chanson des vieux amants"), "Who's next?" ("Au suivant"), from the album Brel (1992)

Roberta Miranda

- "Ne me quitte pas", from the album Pele de Amor (2002)

Gerry De Mol and Eva de Roovere

- "Teder hart" ("Les coeurs tendres"), from the album Min & meer (2005)

Moloko

- "If You Go Away (DJ Skymoo mix)" ("Ne me quitte pas"), from the album The Remix Album...Diamonds Are Forever (2000)

Momus

- "Nicky" ("La chanson de Jacky"), "Don't leave" ("Ne me quitte pas"), "See a friend in tears" ("Voir un ami pleurer"), EP (1986)

Moondog Jr.

- "Jackie", from the album Every Day I Wear a Greasy Feather on my Hat (1995)

Matt Monro

- "No me dejes" ("Ne me quitte pas"), from the album Matt Monro en Espanol (1995)

Anton Montagne and Guus Westdorp

- "Amsterdam", "Kinderen van..." ("Fils de..."), "Il y a, Madeleine", "Le prochain amour", "J'en appelle", "Bruxelles", "Mijn vlakke land" ("Le plat pays"), "Mathilde", "La chanson des vieux amants", from the album Door elkaar (1997)

Des de Moor

- "Marieke", from the album Ne me quitte pas: Brel songs by... (1998)
- "L'ivrogne", from the album Photographs in Empty Houses (1999)
- "My father said" ("Mon père disait"), from the album Water of Europe (1999)

Éric Morena

- "La quête", from the album Oh mon bateau (2005)

Estrella Morente

- "Ne me quitte pas", from the album Mujeres (2006)

Ronny Mosuse

- "If You Go Away" ("Ne me quitte pas") (2003)

Mouron

- "La quête", "Fils de...", "Au suivant", "Les Flamandes", "Marieke", "Les prénoms de Paris", "L'ivrogne", "Mathilde", "Quand on n'a que l'amour", "Vesoul", "Madeleine", "Ces gens-là", "La chanson de Jacky", "Ne me quitte pas", "J'arrive", "Le bon Dieu", "Le tango funèbre", "Amsterdam", "Voir un ami pleurer", "Tu m'as apporté des bonbons", from the album Quinze années d'amour (2003)

Nana Mouskouri

- "If You Go Away" ("Ne me quitte pas"), "Seasons in the Sun" ("Le moribond"), from the album Nana's Book of Songs (1974)
- "Le plat pays", "Ne me quitte pas", from the album Hommages (1997)

Alison Moyet

- "Ne me quitte pas", from the album The Essential (2003)
- "La chanson des vieux amants", from the album Voice (2004)

Danny de Munk

- "Hart en ziel" ("La chanson des vieux amants"), from the album Hart en ziel (2007)

I Muvrini

- "Amsterdam", from the album A Strada (2000)

Mystic Moods Orchestra

- "If You Go Away " ("Ne me quitte pas"), from the album Stormy Weekend

== N ==
Xavier Naidoo

- "Amsterdam", from the album Superstars singen Jacques Brel (2006)

Nard Reijnders Consort

- "Jacques Brel Suite" ("Bruxelles", "Le moribond", "Ces gens-là", "Les Flamandes", "Amsterdam", "Ne me quitte pas", "Quand on n'a que l'amour", "Marieke"), from the album Ode aan Jacques Brel (2003)

Sandy Newman

- "Voir un ami pleurer", from the album Ne me quitte pas: Brel songs by... (1998)

Benny Neyman

- "Marjan" ("Les remparts de Varsovie"), from the album Samen zijn we rijk (1978)
- "Wij zitten goed voor de T.V." ("Voir un ami pleurer"), from the album Samen zijn we rijk (1978)

Olivia Newton-John

- "If we only have love" ("Quand on n'a que l'amour"), from the album Olivia (1972)

Judy Niemack

- "La chanson des vieux amants", from the album Night and the Music (1997)

Astrid Nijgh and Jan Rot

- "Wordt 't ja - wordt 't nee" ("Le moribond"), from the album Nachtlied (2005)

Willem Nijholt

- "Jackie", from the album Van Elsschot tot Nijgh (1971)

Rob de Nijs

- "Lied van de oudere minnaars" ("La chanson des vieux amants"), from the album Tussen zomer en winter (1977)
- "Laat me niet alleen" ("Ne me quitte pas"), from the album Roman (1983)
- "De nuttelozen van de nacht" ("Les paumés du petit matin"), from the album De reiziger (1989)

Nirvana

- "Seasons in the sun" ("Le moribond"), from the album With the Lights Out (2004)

Noir Désir

- "Ces gens là", from the album Aux suivants (2003)

== O ==
Orchestre Symphonique de RTL

- "Amsterdam", "Bruxelles", "Quand on a que l’amour", "Le moribond", "Mathilde", "Les Flamandes", "Je ne sais pas", "La valse à mille temps", "Ne me quitte pas", from the album Brel: Le monde symphonique de Jacques Brel (1992)

== P ==
Saara Pakkasvirta

- "Amsterdam", "Epätoivoiset" ("Les désespérés"), "Porvarit" ("Les bourgeois"), from the album Laulusi elää, Brel I (1984)
- "Rakastin" ("J'aimais"), from the album Laulusi elää, Brel II (1986)

Florent Pagny

- "Pagny chante Brel" (2007)

Gino Paoli

- "Non andare via" ("Ne me quitte pas"), (1962)

Paparazzi

- "Ne me quitte pas", from the album Brel Québec (1993)

Paper Chase

- "My death" ("La mort"), from the album What Big Teeth You Have (2004)

Bruce Parker

- "Ne me quitte pas", from the album Piano: 100 melodies inoubliables (2003)

Doug Parkinson

- "Ne me quitte pas", from the album Somewhere After Midnight (2005)

Jean Claude Pascal

- "Bitte geh' nicht fort", from the album Bitte geh' nicht fort

Danièle Pascal

- "Le Bon Dieu", "Les Marquises", "Les Coeurs Tendres", "My Childhood" ("Mon enfance"), "Marieke", "Il Neige Sur Liege", "Amsterdam", "Les Flamandes", "Sons Of" ("Fils de"), "Le Plat Pays", "La Fanette Pas", "Ne Me Quitte Pas", "I Loved, On N'oublie Rien", "La Valse a Mille Temps", "Quand on n'a que l'amour", from the album Pascal Sings Brel (1988)

Daniele Pascal

- "la tendresse, la chanson des vieux amants", "Voir un ami pleurer", from the album Broken Dreams (2003)

Guesch Patti

- "Quand on n'a que l'amour", from the album Hommage: Ils chantent Jacques Brel (1998)

Freda Payne

- "If You Go Away" ("Ne me quitte pas"), from the album Reaching Out (1973)

Pearls Before Swine

- "Seasons in the Sun" ("Ne me quitte pas"), from the album City of Gold (1971)

Bart Peeters

- "Laat me niet alleen" ("Ne me quitte pas"), from the album Het plaatje van Bart Peeters (2004)
- "Een vriend zien huilen" ("Voir un ami pleurer"), from the album De ideale man (2010)

Anne Peko

- "Ne me quitte pas", "Sur la place", "Il neige sur Liège", "Amsterdam", "Orly", "Les bonbons", "J'arrive", "La quête", from the album D'Amsterdam à Göttingen... (2004)

Henry Pelissier

- "Ne me quitte pas", "Quand on n'a que l'amour", from the album Les plus belles chansons... disc 1 (1992)

Petra and Ferruccio

- "Non andare via" ("Ne me quitte pas"), from the album Musica nuda 2 (2006)

Nicolas Peyrac

- "Jacky", from the album Hommage: Ils chantent Jacques Brel (1998)

The Pierre Hurel Trio

- "Ne me quitte pas", from the album My Life is Like a French Movie (2001)

Siân Phillips

- "If You Go Away" ("Ne me quitte pas"), from the album And So It Goes (2003)

Joaquin Phoenix

- "If You Go Away", from the film and soundtrack Joker: Folie à Deux (2024)

Vadim Piankov

- "Amsterdam", "La cathédrale", "L’ivrogne", "Fernand", "La foire", "Pourquoi faut-il que les hommes s’ennuyent?", "Ne me quitte pas", "Mon père disait", "Madeleine", "Bruxelles", "Quand on n’a que l’amour", "Le plat pays", "Sur la place", "Il neige sur Liège", "Les Vieux", "Orly", "La quête", ("L’homme de la Mancha"), "Jojo", from the album Chante Jacques Brel (1998)
- "Le plat pays", "Jef", "Ne me quitte pas", "L'ivrogne", "Les vieux", "Les fenêtres", "Mon père disait; L'enfance", "Marieke", "Fernand", "La quête", "Orly", "Amsterdam", from the album Brel... Barbara (2001)

Magda Piskorczyk

- "Hearts" ("Les coeurs tendres"), from the album Magda Live (2008)

Les Pois Z’ont Rouges

- "Les bonbons", from the album Brel Québec (1993)

Polo

- "La Fanette", from the album Aux suivants (2003)

Ronnie Potsdammer

- "Een vrouw of een hond" ("Les filles et les chiens")

Franck Pourcel

- "Ne me quitte pas", from the album Mes plus grands succès (2005)

Praga Khan

- "Le port d'Amsterdam", from the album Puur Brel (2003)

Paty Pravo

- "Non andare via" ("Ne me quitte pas"), from the album Bravo Pravo (1971)
- "Canzone degli amanti" ("La chanson des vieux amants"), from the album Di vero in fondo (1971)

Duilio Del Prete

- "Non lasciarmi solo" ("Ne me quitte pas"), "Marieke", "Amsterdam", "Quelli là" ("Ces gens-là"), "La canzone di Jacky" ("La chanson de Jacky"), "La bassa landa" ("Le plat pays"), "Mio padre diceva" ("Mon père disait"), "La mia infanzia" ("Mon enfance"), "I borghesi" ("Les bourgeois"), "Maddalena" ("Madeleine"), "Il leone" ("Le lion"), "I bastioni di Varsavia" ("Les remparts de Varsovie"), "La fanette", "La canzone dei vecchi amanti" ("La chanson des vieux amants"), "I vecchi" ("Les Vieux"), "Non lasciarmi solo ("Ne me quitte pas") / "La canzone dei vecchi amanti", "Dulcinea", "Guarda bene, figliolo" ("Regarde bien, petit"), "Avanti un altro" ("Au suivant")/"La colomba" ("La colombe"), "Zangra", "Jaurès", "I borghesi (Ripresa)", "Knokke-le-Zoute", "A tutto valzer" ("La valse à mille temps"), "Orly", "Vedere piangere un amico" ("Voir un ami pleurer") /"Jef" / "Jojo", "La città s'addormiva" ("La ville s'endormait"), "Stasera sono estate" ("Je suis un soir d'été"), "Amsterdam", "Il moribondo" ("Le moribond"), "Arrivo" ("J'arrive") / "Invecchiare" / "L'ultima cena" ("Le dernier repos"), "Les Marquises", "La meta" ("La quête"), from Duilio Del Prete canta Brel (2002)

Pumajaw

- "La chanson des vieux amants", from the album Becoming Pumajaw (2006)

Purper

- "Moenie weggaan nie" ("Ne me quitte pas"), from the album Purper blikt vooruit (2006)

== R ==
Laurika Rauch

- "Moenie weggaan nie" ("Ne me quitte pas"), "I loved" ("J' aimais"), "You don't forget" ("On n'oublie rien"), "The old folks" ("Les vieux"), "Tenderness" ("La tendresse"), "My childhood" ("Mon enfance"), "Sons of..." ("Fils de..."), "The early morning hangers on" ("Les paumés du petit matin"), "Song of the old lovers" ("La chanson des vieux amants"), "My open land" ("Le plat pays"), "Little hypocrites" ("Les bigotes"), "If We Only Have Love" ("Quand on n'a que l'amour"), "Marieke", from the album The Brel Album (1997)

Jarkko Rantanen

- "Lapset" ("Fils de"), "Koiranelämää" ("Les filles et les chiens"), "Yksin" ("Seul"), from the album Laulusi elää, Brel I (1984)
- "Kuolema", "Mathilde", from the album Laulusi elää, Brel II (1986)

Rapalje

- "De stad Amsterdam" ("Amsterdam"), from the album Celtic Fire (2007)

Raz, Dwa, Trzy

- "Piosenka starych kochanków" ("La Chanson des vieux amants"), from the album Młynarski(2007)

Phil Rectra

- "Jackie", "Funeral tango" ("Tango funèbre"), "Amsterdam", "Fanette", from the album Phil Rectra Sings Brel and Walker (2004)

Dean Reed

- "If You Go Away" ("Ne me quitte pas"), from the album Dean Reed a jeho svět (1976)

Serge Reggiani

- "Les bourgeois", from the album Hommage: Ils chantent Jacques Brel (1998)

Selma Reis

- "Ne me quitte pas", from the album Todo Sentimento (2001)

Nicolas Repac

- "Le moribond", from the album La vile (2006)

Tine Reymer

- "Les Flamandes", "Fernand", from the album Brel op 1 (1998)

Catherine Ribeiro

- "Ne me quitte pas", from the album L'amour aux nus (1992)

Patrick Riguelle

- "Regarde bien petit", "Les Marquises", from the album Brel op 1 (1998)

Markku Riikonen

- "Jacky", "Hautajaistango" ("Tango funèbre"), "Vanhan pojan bourree" ("La bourrée du célibataire"), from the album Laulusi elää, Brel I (1984)
- "Fanette", "Sanaton laulu" ("Chanson sans paroles"), from the album Laulusi elää, Brel II (1986)

Susana Rinaldi

- "Chanson des vieux amants", from the album La voz del tango (2004)

Alma Ritano

- "No me dejes" ("Ne me quitte pas"), from the album Alma del amor (1993)

Robert

- "La chanson des vieux amants", from the album Sine (2001)

Tom Robinson

- "Yuppie scum" ("Les bourgeois"), from the album Ne me quitte pas: Brel songs by... (1998)

Philippe Robrecht

- "Mijn vader zei" ("Mon père disait")

Jimmie Rodgers

- "The Lovers"

Laurens van Rooyen

- "La chanson des vieux amants", from the album Rêverie (1980)

Maarten van Roozendaal

- "Een vrouw of een hond" ("Les filles et les chiens"), from the album Ode aan Jacques Brel (2003)

Ângela Rô Rô

- "Ne me quitte pas", from the album Nosso amor ao Armagedon (1993)

Stig Rossen

- "If We Only Have Love" ("Quand on n'a que l'amour"), from the album Live in Concert (1994)

Leon Rosselon

- "Jaurès", from the album Ne me quitte pas: Brel songs by... (1998)

Gildor Roy

- "Comment tuer l’amant d'sa femme", from the album Brel Québec (1993)

Annie Royer

- "La valse à mille temps", from the album C'est si bon (2000)

== S ==
Sylvia Syms

- "If You Go Away" ("Ne me quitte pas"), from the album Love Lady (1970)

Harry Sacksioni

- "La chanson des vieux amants", from the album Oorsprong (1998)

Sandler & Young (Tony Sandler & Ralph Young)

- "If You Go Away" ("Ne me quitte pas"), from the album Great Gentlemen of Song (1998)

Scala

- "Voir un ami pleurer", from the album Puur Brel (2003)

Dirk Schäfer

- "Warten auf Madeleine" ("Madeleine"), "Intro zu La Fanette", "La Fanette", "Aus der Hölle" ("Le diable"), "Solche Leute da" ("Ces gens-là"), "Die Spießbürger" ("Les bourgeois"), "Litanies pour un retour", "Der Säufer" ("L`ivrogne"), "Les désespérés", "Mathilde", "Ne me quitte pas", "Ulm" ("Vesoul"), "La chanson des vieux amants", "Les toros", "Die Pralinés" ("Les bonbons"), "Amsterdam", "Die Alten" ("Les Vieux"), from the album Doch davon nicht genug: Dirk Schäfer singt Jacques Brel (2003)

Werner Schneyder

- "Das Lied von der alten Liebe" ("La chanson des vieux amants"), from the album Sentimental: Meine Lieder (2004)

Jokke Schreurs Trio

- "Ne me quitte pas", from the album Muziek van voor den oorlog (2002)

Georges Schmitt

- "Ne me quitte pas", from the album Pan Flute (1996)

Secret Chiefs 3

- "La Chanson de Jacky", single (2012)

The Seekers

- "If You Go Away" ("Ne me quitte pas"), from the album Seen in Green (1967)

Jean-Claude Seferian

- "La chanson des vieux amants", "Madeleine", from the album L'homme qui te ressemble (1993)
- "Le plat pays", "Les prénoms de Paris", "Mon enfance", "Mathilde", "Quand on n'a que l'amour", "Ne me quitte pas", "Amsterdam", "Bruxelles", "Jef", "L'ivrogne", "La quête", "La valse à mille temps", "Les Marquises", "Askoy Blues", from the album Ne me quitte pas: Jean-Claude Seferian chante Brel (1998)

The Sensational Alex Harvey Band

- "Next" ("Au suivant"), from the album Next (1973)

Ramses Shaffy

- "Mathilde", from the television documentaryDe regenwegen van Brel (1980)

Sandie Shaw

- "Ne me quitte pas", from the album There's Always Something There... (1990)

Shlomi Shaban

- "Al Telkhi Akhshav" ("Ne me quitte pas"), from the album Migdal HaPizmon (2009)

Noar Shulayim

- "Benamal" ("Amsterdam")

Shusha Guppy

- "Song of long-time lovers" ("Chanson des vieux amants"), from the album Song of long-time lovers (1972)
- "The Devil" ("Le diable"), from the album Song of long-time lovers (1972)
- "Marieke", from the album This is the Day (2001)

Maat Sieben Howden

- "Amsterdam", from the album A Tribute to Scott Walker (2006)

Nina Simone

- "Ne me quitte pas", from the album I Put a Spell on You (1965)
- "The Desperate Ones" ("Les désespérés"), from the album Nina Simone and piano! (1969)

Frank Sinatra

- "If You Go Away" ("Ne me quitte pas"), from the album My Way (1967)
- "I'm not afraid" ("Fils de"), from the album Frank Sinatra's Greatest Hits Vol. 2 (1970)

Eddie Skoller

- "If You Go Away" ("Ne me quitte pas"), "Zambra" ("Zangra"), from the album What Did you Learn in School Today (1980)
- "Mathilde", "Bon Bons" ("Les bonbons"), from the album Eddie Skoller & Hans 6-strengs én mands band (1982)

Sleeping Pictures

- "Girls and Dogs" ("Les filles et les chiens"), from the album A Tribute to Scott Walker (2006)

Ernst Daniël Smid

- "Liefde van later" ("La chanson des vieux amants"), from the album Gevoel van geluk (2003)

Wende Snijders

- "Wende"

The Spell

- "Seasons in the Sun" ("Le moribond"), from the album Seasons in the Sun (1993)

Frédérique Spigt

- "Voir un ami pleurer", from the album De Plantage (1998)

Spiritual Brothers

- "Ne me quitte pas", from the album Spiritual Brothers (2003)

Dusty Springfield

- "If You Go Away" ("Ne me quitte pas"), from the album The Look of Love (1967)

Thérèse Steinmetz

- "Adieu papa" ("Le moribond"), from the album Thérèse (1976)

Starflam

- "Ce plat pays II", from the album Puur Brel (2003)

Stéphane & Didier

- "Bruxelles", "La Fanette", "Ne me quitte pas", "Le plat pays", "Amsterdam", "Madeleine", "La chanson des vieux amants", "Les bonbons", from the album Nos chansons préférées (2007)
- "Amsterdam", "Rosa", "Die Spießer" ("Les bourgeois"), "Marieke", "Alle Kinder sind wie deine" ("Fils de..."), from the album Französische Chansons für deutsche Liebhaber (2007)

Berdien Stenberg

- "Ne me quitte pas", "Bruxelles", "Rosa", from the album Het beste uit de... top 100 (1995)

Sting

- "Ne me quitte pas", from the album Shape of my Heart (1993)

Stories from the Moon

- "Les coeurs tendres", from the album Stories from the Moon (2006)

Evabritt Strandberg

- "Jag vet nästan inget alls" ("Je ne sais pas"), "Marieke", "Knokke Le-Zoute", "Min älskade" ("La chanson des vieux amants"), "Amsterdam", "Du får inte gå" ("Ne me quitte pas"), "Det doftar öl" ("La biére"), "Fernand", "Begravningstango" ("Le tango funèbre"), "Flen" ("Vesoul"), "Jag minns" ("J'arrive"), "Kanske kärlek är allt" ("Quand on n'a que l'amour"), from the album Evabritt Strandberg sjunger Brel (1995)

Subincision

- "Le Moribond" ("Dying Man"), from the album Berkley's Newest Hitmakers (2000)
- "Ne Me Quitte Pas", from the album When You Went Away (2002)

Camille O'Sullivan

- "Vesoul", "Song for Old Lovers" ("La chanson des vieux amants"), "Next" ("Au suivant"), "My Death" ("La mort"), "Voir un ami pleurer", "Sons of" ("Fils de"), "Amsterdam", "Ne me quitte pas", "Middle Class" ("Les bourgeois"), "Old folks" ("Les Vieux"), "Marieke", "Le moribond", "We must look" ("Il nous faut regarder"), "Jackie", "If We Only Have Love" ("Quand on n'a que l'amour"), from the album Sings Brel Live (2004)

The Sword Vulcano Complex

- "My Death" ("La mort"), from the album A Tribute to Scott Walker (2006)

== T ==
Tout Va Bien

- "If You Go Away", single (2013)

Telstar

- "Le moribond", from the album Puur Brel (2003)

Jacky Terrasson

- "Ne me quitte pas", from the album A Paris... (2001)

Têtes Raides

- "Les Vieux", from the album Aux suivants (2003)

JP den Tex and Les Gueux

- "Marieke", from the album After Hours (1993)

Toots Thielemans

- "Ne me quitte pas", from the album Do Not Leave Me (1989)

Romain Tonazzi and Pascal

- "Ne me quitte pas", from the album 28 melodies populaire françaises a la guitare (1990)

Michèle Torr

- "Quand on n'a que l'amour", from the album A mi-vie (1993)
- "Amsterdam", from the album Hommage: Ils chantent Jacques Brel (1998)

Emiliana Torrini

- "If You Go Away" ("Ne me quitte pas"), from the album To Be Free Pt. 1 (1999)

Dédé Traké

- "Les bourgeois", from the album Brel Québec (1993)

Tran Thai Hoa

- "If You Go Away" ("Ne me quitte pas")

Sylvie Tremblay

- "La quête", from the album Brel Québec (1993)

Jackie Trent

- "If You Go Away", from the album The Look of Love (1969)

Triggerfinger

- "Au suivant", from the album Puur Brel (2003)

Mari Trini

- "Ne me quitte pas", single (1974)

Will Tura

- "Mijn vlakke land" ("Le plat pays"), from the album Vlaanderen (1988)

== U ==
Henk van Ulsen

- "Jacky" ("La chanson de Jacky"), "De stier" ("Les toros"), "En wie volgt!" ("Au suivant!"), "Doodsbed-tango" ("Le tango funèbre"), "De meisjes en de honden" ("Les filles et les chiens"), from the album Hommage aan Jacques Brel (1974)

== V ==
Pierre Vaiana

- "Le moribond", "Chanson de Jacky", "Les Marquises", "Les bourgeois", "Mathilde", "La chanson des vieux amants", "Vésoul", "Le plat pays", "Les bonbons", "Bruxelles", "Les paumés du petit matin", "Voir un ami pleurer", from the album L'âme des poètes: joue Brel (1996)

Conny Vandenbos

- "Oud" ("Vieille"), from the album Conny Vandenbos (1964)

René Vandendorpe

- "Ne me quitte pas", from the album Winnaar Publieksprijs 2005 Concours de la Chanson

Maurizio Vandelli

- "Non lasciarmi solo" ("Ne me quitte pas"), from the album Se nei '90... (1991)

Ornella Vanoni

- "Ne me quitte pas", from the album Ai miei amici cantautori (2003)

Sylvie Vartan

- "Ne me quitte pas", from the album Olympia 72 (1972)
- "La chanson des vieux amants", from the album Au casino de Paris (1995)
- "Vesoul", from the album Tour de siècle (1999)

Jan Vayne

- "La chanson des vieux amants", from the album Living Colours (1992)

Herman van Veen

- "Liefde van later" ("La chanson des vieux amants"), from the album Herman van Veen II (1969)
- "Dit slag volk" ("Ces gens-là"), from the album Morgen (1970)
- "Ich lieb dich noch" ("La chanson des vieux amants"), from the album An eine ferne Prinzessin (1977)
- "Een vriend zien huilen" ("Voir un ami pleurer"), from the album Anne (1986)
- "Ich weiß" ("Voir un ami pleurer"), from the album Anne (1987)
- "Voir un ami pleurer", from the album You Take my Breath Away (1992)
- "Marieke", from the album My Cat and I (1994)
- "M'n vlakke land" ("Le plat pays"), from the album In echt (1998)
- "Quand on n'a que l'amour", from the album Carré 2000
- "Moenie weggaan nie" ("Ne me quitte pas"), from the album Carré 2000 (2001)
- "Ich loz dir nisht gejn" ("Ne me quitte pas"), from the album Was ich dir singen wollte, Live (2002)

Regine Velasquez

- "If You Go Away" ("Ne me quitte pas")

Velvet Sound Orchestra

- "Ne me quitte pas", from the album Mediterranean nights (1999)

Anthony Ventura Orchestra

- "Ne me quitte pas"

Johan Verminnen

- "Een vriend zien huilen" ("Voir un ami pleurer"), from the album Traag is mooi (1986)
- "Een vriend zien huilen" ("Voir un ami pleurer"), from the album Live for Life (1993)

Bobby Vinton

- "Seasons in the Sun" ("Le moribond"), from the album With Love (1974)

Volvere

- "Etapas de mi vida" ("Le moribond"), from the album Profugos de Chicago (2005)

VonBergh

- "Marieke", "Venlo" ("Amsterdam"), "Unne vrind zeen bäöke" ("Voir un ami pleurer"), "De nuttelozen van de nacht" ("Les paumés du petit matin"), "Laot mich neet allein" ("Ne me quitte pas"), from the album Brecht-Brel (2006)

Helena Vondráčková

- "Lásko prokletá" ("Ne me quitte pas") , Live in Lucerna 2010

David Vos

- "Jojo", "La chanson de Jacky", "De nuttelozen van de nacht" ("Les paumés du petit matin"), "Le moribond", "Voir un ami pleurer", "Fernand", "La valse à mille temps", "Mijn vlakke land" ("Le plat pays"), "C'est comme ça, Ces gens-là, "Vesoul", "De drinker" ("L'ivrogne"), from the album David Vos zingt Brel in café 't Blaauwhooft (2001)

Luc de Vos

- "De sluiswacht" ("L'éclusier"), from the album Brel op 1 (1998)

== W ==
Hessel van der Wal

- "Alleen" ("Seul"), from the album Ode aan Jacques Brel (2003)

The Walkabouts

- "People Such as These" ("Ces gens-là"), from the album Train leaves at eight (2001)

Scott Walker

- "Mathilde", "My Death" ("La mort"), "Amsterdam", from the album Scott (1967)
- "Jackie" ("La chanson de Jacky"), "Next" ("Au suivant"), "The Girls and the Dogs" ("Les filles et les chiens"), from Scott 2 (1968)
- "Sons of..." ("Fils de..."), "Funeral Tango" ("Tango funèbre"), "If You Go Away" ("Ne me quitte pas"), from the album Scott 3 (1969)
- "Alone" ("Seul"), on his BBC Television series "Scott" in 1969, live version only
- Scott Walker Sings Jacques Brel (1981)

Dionne Warwick

- "If We Only Have Love" ("Quand on n'a que l'amour"), from Dionne (1972)

Konstantin Wecker

- "Joe" ("Jacky"), from the album Superstars singen Jacques Brel (2006)

Wende

- "Ça va, La valse à mille temps", "Ne me quitte pas", "La quête", from the album Quand tu dors (2004)
- "Au suivant", from the album Au suivant (2005)
- "Le plat pays", "Vesoul", "De nuttelozen van de nacht" ("Les paumés du petit matin"), "Les désespérés", from La fille noyee (2006)
- "J'arrive", from Chante! (2008)

Dottie West

- "If You Go Away" ("Ne me quitte pas"), from What I'm Cut Out to Be (1968)

Westlife

- "Seasons in the Sun" ("Le moribond"), single (1999)

Cherry Wijdenbosch

- "Mijn vlakke land" ("Le plat pays"), from Niet ik (1999)

Jeroen Willems

- "De namen van Parijs" ("Les prenoms de Paris"), "Mijn jeugd" ("Mon enfance"), "Madeleine, Mijn vlakke land" ("Le plat pays") "Wie volgt" ("Au suivant"), "Nuchter" ("A jeun"), "De radelozen" ("Les désespérés"), "Schiphol" ("Orly"), "Fernand, Laat me niet alleen" ("Ne me quitte pas"), "De dronken man" ("L'ivrogne"), "De stervende" ("Le moribond"), "Fanette", "Mathilde", from the album Jeroen Willems zingt Jacques Brel (2006)

Andy Williams

- "Seasons in the Sun" ("Le moribond"), from the album Reflexions (1991)

Nancy Wilson

- "If We Only Have Love" ("Quand on n'a que l'amour"), from the album Live from Las Vegas (2002)

Edward Woodward

- "If You Go Away" ("Ne me quitte pas"), from the album Love is the Key (1977)

Nanette Workman

- "Ne me quitte pas", from the album Brel Québec (1993)

== Y ==
Glenn Yarbrough

- "The Women" ("Les biches"), from the album The Lonely Things (1966)

== Z ==
Zakformaat XL

- "De sluiswacht" ("L’éclusier"), from the album N°1 (2000)

Georghe Zamfir

- "If You Go Away" ("Ne me quitte pas"), from the album Images (1989)

Brane Završan

- "Starci" ("Les vieux"), "Sin ..." ("Fils de ..."), "Sledeći" ("Au suivant"), "Saj ne boš kar šla" ("Ne me quitte pas"), "Per" ("La biere"), "Ti ljudje" ("Ces gens-la"), "Jaures", "Amsterdam", "Štef" ("Jeff"), "Ona" ("Mathilde"), "Orly", "La, la, la ...", "Tko kot zmer" ("Vesoul"), "Obupanci" ("Les desesperes"), "Že grem" ("J'arrive"), from the album Senca tvojega psa (2009)

Zebda

- "Jaurès", from the album Aux suivants (2003)

Zeki Müren

- "Beni terketme" ("Ne me quitte pas")

Zinzin

- "Vesoul", from the album 20 Success dela chanson (2000)

Zita Swoon

- "Jackie", from the album Every Day I Wear a Greasy Feather on my Hat (2000)
