= Jacques Brel Is Alive and Well and Living in Paris (film) =

- DVD cover
- Directed by: Denis Héroux
- Written by: Eric Blau
- Produced by: Paul Marshall
- Starring: Mort Shuman; Elly Stone; Joe Masiell
- Cinematography: René Verzier
- Edited by: Yves Langlois
- Music by: Jacques Brel; Gérard Jouannest
- Production company: American Film Theatre
- Distributed by: American Film Theatre
- Release dates: January 27, 1975 (Canada); February 24, 1975 (USA); January 28, 1976 (France)
- Running time: 98 minutes
- Countries: France; Canada; United States
- Languages: English; French

Jacques Brel Is Alive and Well and Living in Paris is a 1975 French/Canadian musical film directed by Denis Héroux. The screenplay by Eric Blau is an adaptation of his book for the long-running off-Broadway revue of the same name. The score is composed of songs with music by Jacques Brel and his accompanist Gérard Jouannest and English translations of the original French lyrics by Blau and Mort Shuman.

Jacques Brel Is Alive and Well and Living in Paris was produced and released by the American Film Theatre, which adapted theatrical works for a subscription-driven cinema series. It was the second of two musical films created by the American Film Theatre, following Lost in the Stars in 1974.

== Plot ==
The film opens in a puppet theater, where three audience members—a military officer, a taxi driver, and a woman on a shopping trip—discover they are being depicted as marionette caricatures against a backdrop of newsreel footage from the 1920s through the 1950s. They find themselves trapped backstage amidst bizarre circumstances ... the puppet master is found dead above the stage, a gigantic plaster hand drops from the ceiling to the floor, and a deafening siren blares endlessly. The trio escapes from the theater to a beach, where the military officer locates the siren and kicks it, causing it to blow up.

The film then resumes the stage show's plotless structure. In this version, different cinematic interpretations are used to illustrate the show's score. A straightforward approach is for some songs: "Bachelor's Dance" finds a bartender singing out loud of his potential mate while eyeing the female patrons of his establishment, while "Amsterdam" places a weary inebriate in a barroom corner while he watches the mix of sailors and sexual predators pass by his table. Other songs are interpreted in a surreal manner: with "Marieke", images of a large red ball bouncing off a cliff are mixed with that of Elly Stone, dressed in a suit and tie, pursuing a little girl amidst the headstones of a cemetery.

== Cast ==
- Elly Stone as Lady with Shopping Bag
- Mort Shuman as Taxi Driver
- Joe Masiell as Marine
- Jacques Brel as himself
- Annick Berger
- Moni Yakim
- Bernard Lafontaine
- France Lombard
- Sophie Héroux
- Nico Sirakos
- Jean Schianno
- René Quivrin
- Paule Tanneur
- Martial

== Production ==
The original off-Broadway revue was a series of 25 songs performed by two men and two women. For the film version, screenwriter Blau and director Heroux reconfigured the presentation. One of the women was dropped from the cast line-up, and a chorus consisting of young hippies and eccentric-looking characters was added.

Mort Shuman and Elly Stone were members of the original off-Broadway cast, while Joe Masiell was a replacement later in the run. These were the only film performances of Stone and Masiell, whose respective careers focused on theatre and cabaret performances. Jacques Brel, who had no part in the original stage production, was recruited for a guest appearance.

François Rauber served as the film's music director and orchestrated and conducted the score. The order of the songs was rearranged, and the original overture was cut, replaced with the song "Madeleine" performed during the title sequence by off-camera singers. Three songs from the original revue were also cut: "The Girls And The Dogs (Les filles et les chiens)", "Fanette (La Fanette)", and "You're Not Alone (Jef)". Five new songs were added in their place: "The Taxi Cab (Le gaz)", "My Childhood (Mon enfance)", "Last Supper (Le dernier repas)", "Song for Old Lovers (La chanson des vieux amants)", and "Ne me quitte pas". The latter song was performed by Brel in French without English subtitles (there was already a popular English-language translation by Rod McKuen).

Interiors were filmed at the Victorine Studios in Nice.

== Soundtrack ==
Jacques Brel is Alive and Well and Living in Paris has no dialogue; the entire film is sung.

- "Madeleine" – Performed off-camera by Françoise Simon, Joseph Neil, Annette Perrone, Judy Lander and Shawn Elliott (who was a member of the original off-Broadway cast)
- "Marathon" ("Les flamandes") – Mort Shuman, Elly Stone, and Joe Masiell
- "My Childhood" ("Mon enfance") – Elly Stone
- "The Statue" – Joe Masiell
- "Brussels" ("Bruxelles") – Mort Shuman, Elly Stone, and Joe Masiell
- "Jackie" ("La chanson de Jacky") – Mort Shuman
- "Timid Frieda" ("Les timides") – Elly Stone
- "Taxicab" ("Le gaz") – Mort Shuman
- "The Old Folks" ("Les Vieux") – Elly Stone
- "Alone" ("Seul") – Joe Masiell
- "I Loved" ("J'aimais") – Elly Stone
- "Funeral Tango" ("Le tango funèbre") – Mort Shuman
- "Bachelor's Dance" ("La bourrée du célibataire") – Joe Masiell
- "Amsterdam" – Mort Shuman
- "Ne Me Quitte Pas" – Jacques Brel
- "Desperate Ones" ("Les désespérés") – Mort Shuman, Elly Stone, and Joe Masiell
- "Sons of..." ("Fils de...") – Elly Stone
- "The Bulls" ("Les taureaux") – Joe Masiell
- "Marieke" – Elly Stone (performed in English and Flemish)
- "Last Supper" ("Le Dernier Repas") – Mort Shuman, Elly Stone, and Joe Masiell
- "Mathilde" – Mort Shuman
- "The Middle Class" ("Les bourgeois") – Mort Shuman and Joe Masiell
- "Song of Old Lovers" ("La chanson des vieux amants") – Elly Stone
- "Next" ("Au suivant") – Joe Masiell
- "Carousel" ("La valse à mille temps") – Elly Stone
- "If Only We Have Love" ("Quand on n'a que l'amour") – Mort Shuman, Elly Stone, and Joe Masiell.

== Reception ==
In his review in The New York Times, Vincent Canby said, "Mr. Heroux, with the obvious cooperation of Eric Blau and Mort Shuman . . . has transformed what was essentially a concert into an extravaganza of surreal images that keep messing things up. The images are vivid and disconnected to one another (good) but they inevitably wind up being visual translations of the lyrics (bad). It's a rather classy variation on the format employed by the old Hit Parade television show, though it's seldom as witty."

Glenn Erickson of DVD Talk wrote, "As interpreted here, the revue format has the same pacing problems that a stack of music videos would have if there were not enough variety. Many of the songs are amusing or emotional, but after a while too many seem similar—a plaintive half-melody that slowly rises in intensity and volume, until the singer is practically screaming. The elaborate scene changes don't help the fact that we're not seeing live performances—the frantic singers are mouthing to playback, which robs the material of its stage immediacy."

Writing in The Boston Globe, Ed Siegel called the film "the biggest dud of all" in the American Film Theatre series and added, "As directed by Denis Heroux, Brel looks like an amateurish version of Hair." Film critic Kevin Thomas said "the look and feel of the film is dreary; sets are far too literal, yet their transparent artificiality makes them mesh badly with occasional natural locations; Heroux's direction is flat and static when it should be lively and exhilarating; above all, the film desperately needs stylization, direction with some sort of unifying personal vision."
