= Shelley Ackerman =

American astrologer, writer, actress, and singer (1953–2020)

- Born: October 14, 1953; New York City, U.S.
- Died: February 27, 2020 (aged 66); New York City, U.S.
- Education: East Side Hebrew Institute; High School of Music & Art
- Occupations: Astrologist; writer; actress; singer

Shelley Ackerman (October 14, 1953 – February 27, 2020) was an American astrologist, writer, actress and singer. She was a frequent guest and commentator on radio and television news and entertainment shows.

== Early life ==
The daughter of a rabbi, Ackerman was born and raised in Manhattan. She attended the East Side Hebrew Institute on the Lower East Side and graduated with honors from the High School of Music & Art at age 16 in 1970.

== Acting career ==
She began her career at age 17 as a comedic singer (and waitress) at The Improvisation and at age 19 at Catch a Rising Star in New York. She worked at both through the early 1980s, and at the same time performed in NY's major cabaret rooms including: Playboy Club, Continental Baths, Reno Sweeney's, Les Mouches, The Grand Finale, Freddy's Supper Club, Ted Hook's OnStage, and Lox Around the Clock.

She studied with Stella Adler in the early 1980s, and appeared at the 92nd Street Y in New York in the prestigious Lyrics and Lyricists program in 1985, directed by Maurice Levine. It was there that she caught the eye (and ear) of Elly Stone, who remembered her voice in 1987 when she and her husband Eric Blau (who translated Brel's Flemish lyrics into English) were casting for their upcoming 20th anniversary production of Jacques Brel is Alive and Well and Living in Paris.

She starred in the 1988 production of Jacques Brel with Karen Akers at Town Hall in New York and at the Kennedy Center in Washington, D.C. She also played several minor movie roles, including the films Taking Off (1971), Garbo Talks (1984), The Flamingo Kid (1984), The Purple Rose of Cairo (1985), and Crossing Delancey (1988), and on the television shows Kate & Allie and Guiding Light. In 1990, she won the Backstage Bistro Award for Best Vocalist in New York City.

== Astrology ==
Ackerman claimed to have been born with the ability to remember birthdates and developed her interest in astrology in her early teens. In 1974 she and her then-boyfriend, Richard Belzer, obtained their first computerized astrological charts from Astroflash, a small booth set up in Grand Central Terminal in New York City that offered the earliest computer-generated horoscopes. Her interest grew through the 1970s and as an amateur astrologer she collected data (birth dates, times, and places) of her fellow performers between shows at both The Improv and Catch a Rising Star.

Her first position as an astrologer was at Gurney's Inn in Montauk, New York on the July 4 weekend of 1992, and she made her first major contribution to the astrological community later that summer by obtaining Bill Clinton's birthtime from his mother Virginia Kelley.

In 1996 she became the head of the New York affiliate of the American Federation of Astrologers. She was also active in the New York chapter of the National Council for Geocosmic Research, and taught at the New York Theosophical Society (1996-2006). She lectured, taught, and saw clients across the USA, Europe, and Canada, and wrote extensively for Beliefnet.

== Media appearances ==
Ackerman appeared on many television programs, including:

- The O'Reilly Factor (2000–01)
- World News Now (January 2005)
- Toured with Court TV (2005; to promote Psychic Detectives)
- Access Hollywood in 2005-06, 2008-09
- "Is 07/07/07 a Good Day to Tie the Knot?", WABC-TV Eyewitness News (January 17, 2007)
- MSNBC (February 9, 2007)
- The Today Show (February 10, 2007)
- WTTG FOX5 DC (March 12, 2007)
- CBS Evening News
- Extra
- The Caroline Rhea Show
- The Ricki Lake Show
- The Camilla Scott Show
- Fox & Friends

She was a weekly contributor to the Doug Stephan talk radio show (1997–99); she appeared and was a guest on:

- Satellite Sisters
- National Public Radio
- WOR Morning Show.
- SIRIUS Stars

She appeared in print in The New York Times, The New York Daily News, New York Post, Time Out New York, Courier-Post, The Washington Post, USA Today, AOL News, The Philadelphia Inquirer, and Time Out.

== Personal life ==
Ackerman died in Manhattan of cancer on February 27, 2020, at the age of 66.
