= Marieke (album) =

Studio album by Jacques Brel
- Released: April 1961
- Recorded: 22 February – 12 April 1961 (original album)
- Genre: Chanson
- Length: 47 minutes
- Label: Philips

Jacques Brel chronology
La Valse à mille temps (1959)	Marieke (1961)	Les Bourgeois (1962)

Marieke is the fifth studio album by Jacques Brel. Also known as 5, the album was released in 1961 by Philips (B 76.513 R). The album was reissued on 23 September 2003 under the title Marieke as part of the 16-CD box set Boîte à bonbons by Barclay (980 816-7).

== Track listing ==
Track	Title	Translation	Composer	Recorded
1	"Marieke"	Marieke	Jacques Brel, Gérard Jouannest	1961-04-12
2	"Le Moribond"	The dying man	Jacques Brel	1961-02-22
3	"Vivre debout"	Living up	Jacques Brel, François Rauber	1961-04-04
4	"On n'oublie rien"	One forgets nothing	Jacques Brel, Gérard Jouannest	1961-02-22
5	"Clara"	Clara	Jacques Brel	1961-04-04
6	"Le Prochain Amour"	The next love	Jacques Brel, Gérard Jouannest	1961-03-30
7	"L'Ivrogne"	The drunkard	Jacques Brel, François Rauber, Gérard Jouannest	1961-02-22
8	"Les Prénoms de Paris"	The names of Paris	Jacques Brel, Gérard Jouannest	1961-03-30
9	"Les Singes"	Monkeys	Jacques Brel	1961-03-30
10	"Marieke" (in Dutch)	Marieke	Jacques Brel, Gérard Jouannest	1961-04-12
11	"Laat me niet alleen (Ne me quitte pas)"	Don't leave me	Jacques Brel	1961-04-12
12	"De apen (Les Singes)"	Monkeys	Jacques Brel	1961-04-12
13	"Men vergeet niets (On N'Oublie Rien)"	One forgets nothing	Jacques Brel, Gérard Jouannest	1961-04-12
14	"Le prochain amour"	The next love	Jacques Brel, Gérard Jouannest	1961-02-21

== Personnel ==
- Jacques Brel – composer, vocals
- François Rauber – orchestra conductor (tracks 1–9, 14)
- François Rauber et Son Orchestre – orchestra
- Barthélémy Rosso – guitar on "Vivre Debout"
- Jean-Marie Guérin – mastering
- Jacques Aubert – photography
