= La Valse à mille temps =

Studio album by Jacques Brel
- Released: 1959
- Recorded: 11–17 September 1959
- Genre: Chanson
- Length: 30:43
- Labels: Philips (original album); Barclay/Universal

Jacques Brel chronology
Au printemps (1958)	La Valse à mille temps (1959)	Marieke (1961)

Singles from La Valse à mille temps
- 1. "La Valse à mille temps / La Tendresse / Ne me quitte pas / La Dame patronnesse" Released: 1960; 2. "Les Flamandes / Seul / Isabelle / La Colombe" Released: 1960

La Valse à mille temps (English: The Waltz in One Thousand Time) is Jacques Brel's fourth album. Also known as Jacques Brel 4 and American Début, the album was released in 1959 by Philips. The album was reissued on 23 September 2003 under the title La Valse à mille temps as part of the 16-CD box set Boîte à bonbons by Barclay (980 816-6).

The album received the Francis Carco prize from l'Académie du disque français.

== Track listing ==
All tracks are written by Jacques Brel except where noted.

No.	Title	Writer(s)	Length
1.	"La Valse à mille temps" (The Waltz with a Thousand Beats)		3:38
2.	"Seul" (Alone)		3:15
3.	"La Dame patronnesse" (The Patroness)		3:09
4.	"Je t'aime" (I Love You)	Jacques Brel, François Rauber	2:08
5.	"Ne me quitte pas" (Don't Leave Me)	Jacques Brel, Gérard Jouannest	3:38
6.	"Les Flamandes" (The Flemish)		2:25
7.	"Isabelle" (Isabella)	Jacques Brel, François Rauber	3:00
8.	"La Mort" (Death)		2:42
9.	"La Tendresse" (Tenderness)		2:32
10.	"La Colombe" (The Dove)		2:52

== Credits ==
- Jacques Brel – composer, vocals
- François Rauber – orchestra conductor
- Gérard Jouannest – piano
- Jean-Marie Guérin – mastering
- J. Aubert – photography
- M. Apelbaum – photography

The melody of "La Mort" is partly based, uncredited, on the traditional Gregorian chant Dies irae, which has been quoted in a large number of other works over the centuries.
