= Jacques Brel is Alive and Well and Living in Paris =

Musical revue

- Original Cast Recording
- Music: Jacques Brel
- Lyrics: Jacques Brel (French version); Eric Blau (English version); Mort Shuman (English version)
- Book: Eric Blau (English version); Mort Shuman (English version)
- Basis: The original French lyrics and French commentary by Jacques Brel
- Productions: 1968 Off-Broadway Regional productions 1995 West End; 2006 Off-Broadway revival 2014 Off-West End

Jacques Brel Is Alive and Well and Living in Paris is a musical revue of the songs of Jacques Brel. Brel's songs were translated into English by Eric Blau and Mort Shuman, who also provided the story. The original 1968 Off-Broadway production ran for four years and spawned international and regional productions, as well as a West End production and Off-Broadway revival, among others. A film adaptation was released in 1975.

In 2003, David Bowie included the cast recording in a list of 25 of his favorite albums, "Confessions of a Vinyl Junkie".

== Early productions ==
The revue debuted Off-Broadway on January 22, 1968, at The Village Gate Theater in Greenwich Village and ran for more than four years. Its original performers were Elly Stone, Mort Shuman, Shawn Elliott, and Alice Whitfield. The production was directed by Moni Yakim. The revue, consisting of around 25 songs, is performed by four vocalists, two men and two women. Brel contributed most of the music and French lyrics; English translations were provided by Eric Blau, Stone's husband, and Mort Shuman, a Brill Building songwriter.

On September 12, 1968, the show opened at the Happy Medium Theatre on Rush Street in Chicago. It ran until February 15, 1970, and was perhaps the cabaret theater's most successful production. Robert Guillaume, George Ball, Joe Masiell, Denise Le Brun, Alice Whitfield, and Aileen Fitzpatrick made up the original Chicago cast.

The show enjoyed considerable international success. In 1968 Yakim directed a production in Toronto featuring Robert Jeffrey, Judy Lander, Arlene Meadows, and Stan Porter. In 1972, a production by Taubie Kushlick in Johannesburg, South Africa, became the longest-running musical production in that country's theatrical history. A cast recording was released and is regarded as containing the definitive English-language versions of some of the songs. During that decade the show also enjoyed successful runs in Sydney, Paris, Dublin, Amsterdam, and Copenhagen.

In 1973, Ray Shepardson produced Jacques Brel in the lobby of the State Theatre in Cleveland, Ohio. It was intended to play for two weeks, but continued through 1975, with a 522-performance run that became the longest theatrical run in the city's history to that point. The production is credited as a major factor in the rescue and restoration of the theater and its adjacent venues, which are now Playhouse Square Center. In 1974, the revue was revived at the Astor Place Theatre for a limited run. In 1975, a film adaptation of the original production was released as part of the American Film Theatre series. The film included a few new songs.

Despite Brel's death in 1978 after spending his last years sailing around the world and living in Polynesia, the show's name has remained unchanged.

== 1980s and later revivals ==
A production was presented at the original company of Equity Library Theater in New York City in 1985. It starred Louise Edeiken, Richard Hilton, Jan Horvath, and J.C. Sheets.

A 1988 revival served as the 20th-anniversary production of the show at The Town Hall in Manhattan (and one night at The Kennedy Center in Washington, D.C.). It was produced by Blau and Reuben Hoppenstein and directed by Stone, starring Karen Akers, Shelley Ackerman, Elmore James, and Kenny Morris.

In 1994 the show was performed in Dublin's Andrew's Lane Theatre and featured Irish actress and singer Camille O'Sullivan.

In 1995 the show was revived in the West End, starring Michael Cahill, Alison Egan, Liz Greenaway, and Stuart Pendred. A cast recording of this production was released on August 12, 1997, by Jay Records.

In 2006, a production opened Off-Broadway at the Zipper Theater in New York City. While this revival used most of the Blau-Shuman translations, there were also significant changes: the order of songs was rearranged, numbers were reorchestrated, and some songs were dropped or added. The revival also included expanded staging and choreography. The production ran for more than a year. It was nominated for several awards, including the Drama Desk, Drama League, and Outer Critics Circle. It was directed by Gordon Greenberg and starred Robert Cuccioli, Natascia Diaz, Rodney Hicks and Gay Marshall. The role played by Hicks was later done by Drew Sarich, Jim Stanek, and Constantine Maroulis. Ann Mandrella, the wife of Sarich, was an understudy. A cast recording by Ghostlight Records was released in 2006.

In 2008, a production starring Leigh McDonald, Tony McGill, Emma Yong, and George Chan ran at the DBS Theatre in Singapore. In 2010, a production ran at the Stratford Festival in Canada. It starred Jewelle Blackman, Brent Carver, Mike Nadajewski, and Nathalie Nadon. In 2014, the show opened for a limited run in London at Off-West End Charing Cross Theatre with Gina Beck, Daniel Boys, David Burt and Eve Polycarpou. This production had a song list similar to the 2006 New York revival's.

In 2017, a new production opened at the Gate Theatre in Dublin directed by Alan Stanford and featuring music direction by Cathal Synnott, with a cast featuring Karen McCartney, Risteard Cooper, Stephanie McKeown, and Rory Nolan.

== Musical numbers ==
=== Original Off-Broadway production ===
1. Overture
2. Marathon (Les Flamandes)
3. Alone (Seul)
4. Madeleine
5. I Loved (J'aimais)
6. Mathilde
7. Bachelor's Dance (La Bourrée du Célibataire)
8. Timid Frieda (Les Timides) tune also used in an Ovaltine television advert GB
9. My Death (La Mort)
10. The Girls And The Dogs (Les Filles et Les Chiens)
11. Jackie (La Chanson de Jacky)
12. The Statue
13. Desperate Ones (Les Désespérés)
14. Sons of... (Fils de...)
15. Amsterdam
16. The Bulls (Les Taureaux)
17. Old Folks (Les Vieux)
18. Marieke
19. Brussels (Bruxelles)
20. Fanette (La Fanette)
21. Funeral Tango (Le Tango Funèbre)
22. The Middle Class (Les Bourgeois)
23. You're Not Alone (Jef)
24. Next (Au Suivant)
25. Carousel (La Valse à Mille Temps)
26. If We Only Have Love (Quand on n'a Que L'amour)

Songs added for the 1975 film version:

1. The Taxi Cab (Le Gaz)
2. My Childhood (Mon Enfance)
3. The Last Supper (Le Dernier Repas)
4. Song For Old Lovers (La Chanson Des Vieux Amants)
5. Ne Me Quitte Pas, sung by Jacques Brel

=== 2006 Off-Broadway revival ===
Act One

1. Le Diable (Ça Va)
2. If We Only Have Love (Intro)
3. Alone
4. I Loved
5. Jackie
6. My Childhood
7. Madeleine
8. Bachelor's Dance
9. Fanette
10. Le Moribond/My Last Supper
11. The Desperate Ones
12. Timid Frieda
13. The Girls And The Dogs
14. Statue
15. Sons Of
16. Amsterdam

Act Two

1. The Bulls
2. Brussels
3. Ne Me Quitte Pas
4. Middle Class
5. Old Folks
6. Funeral Tango
7. My Death
8. Marieke
9. Song For Old Lovers
10. Next
11. No Love You're Not Alone
12. Carousel
13. If We Only Have Love

== Recording(s) ==
- An original cast album was released in 1968 by Columbia in the US and CBS in the UK. It featured Shawn Elliott, Mort Shuman, Elly Stone, and Alice Whitfield.
- A cast recording of the South African production was released in 1972 and is regarded as containing the definitive English-language versions of some of the songs. It featured Jean Dell, Ann Hamblin, Ferdie Uphof, and Alain D. Woolf.
- In 1973 Playhouse Square released a double album featuring the Cleveland cast: Cliff Bemis, David O. Frazier, Providence Hollander, and Theresa Piteo.
- Atlantic Records release a double album of the film soundtrack in 1975, featuring Shawn Elliott, Judy Lander, Joe Masiell, Joseph Neal, Annette Perrone, Mort Shuman, and Elly Stone.
- Ghostlight Records released a cast recording of the Zipper Theater Off-Broadway production in 2006. Included in the cast were Jacques Brel, Robert Cuccioli, Natascia Diaz, Rodney Hicks, Gay Marshall, Michael Sommers, and Eric Svejcar.
