= If You Go Away =

English adaptation of Jacques Brel song

"If You Go Away" is Rod McKuen's English-language version of the 1959 Jacques Brel song "Ne me quitte pas". Created as part of a larger project to bring Brel's work into English, "If You Go Away" is considered a pop standard and has been recorded by many artists, including Greta Keller, for whom some say McKuen wrote the English lyrics.

The complex melody is partly derivative of classical music: the "But if you stay..." passage comes from Franz Liszt's Hungarian Rhapsody No. 6.

== Lyrics ==
A sad but hopeful ballad, the lyrics are told from the perspective of someone telling their lover how much they would be missed if they left. This is described in vivid, hyperbolic terms, such as "there'll be nothing left in the world to trust". If the lover stays, the narrator promises them both devotion and good times ("I'll make you a day / Like no day has been, or will be again"). Some lines show that the narrator is speaking to the lover as they are already leaving, or considering doing so ("Can I tell you now, as you turn to go..."). The lines "If you go, as I know you will" and later "...as I know you must" make clear that despite the narrator's protests, the lover's leaving is inevitable.

McKuen's version is significantly different from the original Brel lyric, as it is based around contrasting what would happen "if you go away" with what could happen "if you stay".

In the original French version, the singer begs for his lover not to leave him and is more supplicant and almost self-humiliating (the title "Ne me quitte pas" translates as "Do not leave me"). The last image of the French version is significant: although the McKuen version has lyrics that come close to the original sentiment, the French lyrics are far bleaker (as is the song in general): "Let me become the shadow of your shadow, the shadow of your hand, the shadow of your dog" (lit. translation of the original) as opposed to "I'd have been the shadow of your shadow if I thought it might have kept me by your side" (English lyrics).

The English version omits a section of the original version in which the singer begs his lover to give their relationship a second chance, using examples derived from the natural world: "I will tell you of those lovers who saw their hearts catch fire twice;" "Fire has often been seen gushing out of an ancient volcano we thought too old"; "There are, people say, burnt lands that produce more wheat than the best of Aprils".

== Recordings ==
Many other artists have recorded the song.

- Among the most notable is Shirley Bassey's version released as a single which also appeared on her album And We Were Lovers (1967). McKuen was very fond of Bassey's version and wrote to her saying he enjoyed it and thanking her. In 2002, her version of the song featured in the movie Merci Docteur Rey.
- Dusty Springfield recorded version of the song titled "If You Go Away (Ne Me Quitte Pas)" on her third studio album Where Am I Going? (1967), combining the English lyrics with some of the original French verses.
- Damita Jo reached no. 10 on the Adult Contemporary chart and no. 68 on the Billboard Hot 100 in 1966 for her version of the song.
- Tom Jones released a cover in his 1968 album Help Yourself. The album reached no. 4 on the UK Albums Chart and no. 5 on the US Billboard 200.
- Scott Walker included a cover version of the song on his 1969 album Scott 3 which reached no. 3 on the UK Album Charts in 1969.
- Frank Sinatra recorded a cover of the song for his studio album My Way (1969), which reached no. 2 on the UK Album Charts and no. 11 on the Billboard 200 in 1969.
- Neil Diamond released his version of the song on his seventh studio album Stones (1971). The album peaked at no. 11 on the UK Album Charts.
- Terry Jacks recorded a version of the song which was released as a single in 1974 and reached no. 29 on the Adult Contemporary chart, no. 68 on the Billboard Hot 100, no. 45 on "Cash Box Top 100 Singles Chart" and went to no. 8 in the UK.
- Helen Merrill in collaboration with saxophonist Stan Getz released a cover of the song on their 1989 jazz album Just Friends.
- Cyndi Lauper released a cover of the song on her 2003 covers jazz album At Last.

The song has also been featured in films. Joaquin Phoenix recorded a cover for Joker: Folie à Deux (2024).

== See also ==
- List of cover versions of Jacques Brel songs
