= Mathilde (song) =

1966 song by Jacques Brel

Song by Jacques Brel

from the album Ces gens-là
- Language: French
- Written: 1963
- Released: 1964
- Genre: French pop; Chanson
- Length: 2:35
- Label: Barclay
- Composer: Gérard Jouannest
- Lyricist: Jacques Brel

Mathilde is a song by Jacques Brel with music by Gérard Jouannest. It was one of the five tracks appearing on the B-side of his eighth album, Ces gens-là (Those people), released in 1966 on a 10-inch record (ref. 80 222s)

It is what Brel himself called a "monster" (a master song of his album). It was one of his favourite songs of his own repertoire, about which he said "That song's really good. Structurally speaking, it's well-written."

The music was composed by Gérard Jouannest.

Brel performed it for the first time in public on 23 July 1963 at Knokke Casino. The concert was filmed by Belgian television. The song became the one Brel performed as last song in concerts the following years.

== Lyrics ==
Jacques, the narrator, having learnt about the return of Mathilde, a former lover with whom he had a painful relationship, feeling once more inexorably taken over by passion, calls on many of those close to him: his mother ("Mother, now's the time to pray for my soul" and later on "Mother, stop praying, your Jacques's going back to hell"); a maid called Maria who, we might guess, has been an occasional lover ("You the maid, you Maria, you'd better change our bed sheets..."); a bougnat (coalman and barkeeper) ("Bougnat, put away your wine, tonight I'll drink from my sorrow..."); his friends ("My friends, don't leave me, tonight I'm going back to the front...").

He also brings up different parts of his body which symbolise his feelings: his heart ("... My heart, stop racing, remember she tore you apart..."), his hands ("And you my hands, tremble no more, remember when I cried on you...").

His pleas will prove to be in vain. The line between love and hate is tenuous (Jacques goes from "damned Mathilde" to "my beautiful Mathilde"), and he knows from the start that she will come back to him, though he has loved her as much as she has hurt him. Mathilde's return will spark new passions and new torments.

Like Marieke and Madeleine, Mathilde is a song about passionate love for a woman whose name begins with "M".

== Covers ==
- In 1968, Mort Shuman and Eric Blau translated the lyrics into English for their musical revue Jacques Brel is Alive and Well and Living in Paris, with Shuman performing the song in the show and on the cast recording. Scott Walker also recorded this English version on his first solo album the previous year.
- In 1974, the song was covered by Claude Nougaro, (album Récréation) who replaced "Your Jacques" with "Your Claude" in the line "Your Jacques's going back to hell".
- In 2006, it was featured in Juliette Gréco's cover album: Le Temps d'une chanson.
