= Scott 2 =

Studio album by Scott Walker
- Released: 5 April 1968
- Recorded: 1967–1968
- Genre: Baroque pop
- Length: 43:24
- Label: Philips
- Producer: John Franz

Scott Walker chronology
Scott (1967)	Scott 2 (1968)	Scott 3 (1969)

Singles from Scott 2
- 1. "Jackie" b/w "The Plague" Released: 1967

Professional ratings
Review scores
Source	Rating
AllMusic	4.5/5 stars
Pitchfork	(9.1/10)

Scott 2 is the second solo album by Scott Walker, released in 1968 by Philips Records in the UK and Smash Records in the US. Featuring the minor hit "Jackie", it arrived at the height of Walker's commercial success as a solo artist, topping the UK Albums Chart.

Like its predecessor, Scott 2 comprises an assortment of pop cover versions, selections from Walker favorite Jacques Brel, and a handful of original songs.

== Overview ==
Scott 2 follows the formula of Walker's début solo album Scott, with a mixture of contemporary covers ("Black Sheep Boy", "The Windows of the World") Jacques Brel interpretations ("Jackie", "Next", "The Girls and the Dogs"), film songs ("Wait Until Dark", "Come Next Spring") and his own original compositions ("The Amorous Humphrey Plugg", "The Girls from the Streets", "Plastic Palace People", "The Bridge"). The content of his own and Brel's material was markedly more risqué than on Scott, with "Jackie", "Next" and "The Girls from the Streets" standing out with themes of sexual tribulations and decadent lifestyles, while the contributions of Walker's regular arrangers and the structures of his own compositions were becoming more adventurous and progressive.

According to Jonathan King, writing in the liner notes to Scott 2, not long after the album had been completed Walker described it as the "work of a lazy, self-indulgent man." He added, "Now the nonsense must stop, and the serious business must begin." King continues about Walker: "I have no doubt that many years from now, over a space age dinner of vitamins, [...] he will say: 'Well, the last fifty years have been great fun, but now we must get down to doing something worthwhile.' And he'll mean it."

== Release and reception ==
The album, released on Philips Records in on 5 April 1968 in England, reached No. 1 for one week and stayed in the UK Albums Chart for eighteen weeks. The album was preceded by the single "Jackie" in late 1967. The single met with controversy in the UK due to its lyrics about "authentic queers and phony virgins" and drug references. The song was banned by the BBC and was not performed on BBC TV or played on the mainstream radio channels. The song eventually charted at No. 22. The album was eventually released in the United States in July 1968 with different artwork, but sold poorly.

Neil Hannon, frontman of the Divine Comedy, later observed that Scott 2 was "A record about real stuff with quite disturbing imagery".

== Track listing ==
Side one
No.	Title	Writer(s)	Length
1.	"Jackie"	Jacques Brel, Gérard Jouannest, Mort Shuman	3:21
2.	"Best of Both Worlds"	Mark London, Don Black	3:12
3.	"Black Sheep Boy"	Tim Hardin	2:36
4.	"The Amorous Humphrey Plugg"	Scott Engel	4:28
5.	"Next"	Brel, Shuman	2:48
6.	"The Girls from the Streets"	Engel	4:09

Side two
No.	Title	Writer(s)	Length
1.	"Plastic Palace People"	Engel	6:04
2.	"Wait Until Dark"	Henry Mancini, Jay Livingston, Ray Evans	2:57
3.	"The Girls and the Dogs"	Brel, Jouannest, Shuman	3:08
4.	"Windows of the World"	Hal David, Burt Bacharach	4:22
5.	"The Bridge"	Engel	2:47
6.	"Come Next Spring"	Lenny Adelson, Max Steiner	3:27

== Chart positions ==
Chart	Year	Peak position
UK Albums Chart	1968	1

== Personnel ==
- Wally Stott – arranger, conductor (1, 2, 12)
- Reg Guest – arranger, conductor (3, 4, 9)
- Peter Knight – arranger, conductor (6, 10)
- John Franz – producer
- Peter J. Olliff – engineer
- Jonathan King – liner notes

== Release history ==
Region	Date	Label	Format	Catalogue
Germany	1968	Philips	LP	844 210 BY
United Kingdom	March 1968	Philips	LP	7840
United States	July 1968	Smash	LP	7106
United Kingdom	April 27, 1992	Fontana	CD	510 880-2
United Kingdom	June 5, 2000	Fontana	HDCD	510 880-2
United States	February 15, 2008	4 Men With Beards	LP	4M150
