= Scott 3 =

Studio album by Scott Walker
- Released: 21 March 1969
- Genres: Baroque pop; art pop
- Length: 37:22
- Label: Philips
- Producer: John Franz

Scott Walker chronology
| Scott 2 (1968) | Scott 3 (1969) | Scott: Scott Walker Sings Songs from his T.V. Series (1969) |

Professional ratings
Review scores
| Source | Rating |
|---|---|
| AllMusic | 3.5/5 stars |
| Pitchfork | (8.5/10) |

Scott 3 is the third solo album by American singer-songwriter Scott Walker, released on 21 March 1969, in the United Kingdom through Philips Records. It was produced by John Franz. It was Walker's first album to be dominated by his own songwriting, with three covers of Jacques Brel compositions included to close the record.

== Reception ==
=== Commercial ===
Upon release in 1969, it met with slightly fewer sales than his previous albums, as pop audiences struggled to keep pace with Walker's increasingly experimental approach, though it still reached No. 3 on the UK Album Chart.

=== Critical ===
In a retrospective review, Mark Lager wrote that the album contained "contemplative, delicate, and nostalgic songs surrounded by a string section of somber darkness. The opening track 'It's Raining Today' is autumnal, gray, misty, and overcast and his lyrics share similarities with Leonard Cohen's songs from around this same time period. 'Copenhagen' contains Christmas chimes and, at the end, a carnival carousel. His voice is reminiscent of crooner Andy Williams, yet the lyrics are akin to Marcel Proust's Swann's Way in their recollections upon faraway childhood innocence. 'Winter Night' is a crystalline, melancholy mood piece that is best accompanied by a glass of Amontillado sherry."

== Legacy ==
The album's slightly muted reception and subsequent failure of Walker's short-lived BBC TV series signified the beginning of his decline in popularity. Since its release, however, it has been regarded by many of Walker's fans as a favourite.

In September 2019, Thom Yorke, on the BBC Radio 4 show Desert Island Discs, named "It's Raining Today" as one of the eight pieces of music he would take to an imaginary desert island.

The title of the 1981 compilation Fire Escape in the Sky: The Godlike Genius of Scott Walker is taken from the lyrics of the song "Big Louise", and the 2006 documentary Scott Walker: 30 Century Man is named after "30 Century Man".

== Track listing ==
All tracks are written by Scott Walker (credited as S. Engel), except where noted.

Side one
| No. | Title | Length |
|---|---|---|
| 1. | "It's Raining Today" | 4:02 |
| 2. | "Copenhagen" | 2:22 |
| 3. | "Rosemary" | 3:22 |
| 4. | "Big Louise" | 3:10 |
| 5. | "We Came Through" | 1:59 |
| 6. | "Butterfly" | 1:42 |
| 7. | "Two Ragged Soldiers" | 3:07 |

Side two
| No. | Title | Writer(s) | Length |
|---|---|---|---|
| 1. | "30 Century Man" | | 1:29 |
| 2. | "Winter Night" | | 1:45 |
| 3. | "Two Weeks Since You've Gone" | | 2:48 |
| 4. | "Sons Of" | Gérard Jouannest, Jacques Brel, Mort Shuman | 3:45 |
| 5. | "Funeral Tango" | Jouannest, Brel, Shuman | 2:56 |
| 6. | "If You Go Away" | Brel, Rod McKuen | 4:57 |

The original U.S. Smash label vinyl issue omitted "30 Century Man", replacing it with "Lights of Cincinnati", a UK non-LP single from the same period. This issue also featured a different cover design from the UK Philips release.

== Personnel ==
- Scott Walker – vocals
- Keith Altham – liner notes
- Wally Stott – arranger, conductor (1–10, 13)
- Peter Knight – arranger, conductor (11, 12)
- John Franz – producer
- Peter Olliff – engineer
- John Kelly – front photograph
- Linda Glover – sleeve design

== Release history ==
| Region | Date | Label | Format | Catalogue |
|---|---|---|---|---|
| United Kingdom | March 1969 | Philips | LP | SBL 7882 |
| United States | June 1969 | Smash | LP | SRS 67121 |
| United Kingdom | June 22, 1992 | Fontana | CD | 510 881-2 |
| United Kingdom | June 5, 2000 | Fontana | HDCD | 510 881-2 |
| United States | February 15, 2008 | 4 Men With Beards | LP | 4M151 |

== Charts ==
| Chart | Position |
|---|---|
| UK Albums Chart | 3 |
