= Les Vieux =

1963 song by Jacques Brel

Song by Jacques Brel

from the album Les Bigotes
- Released: 1963
- Recorded: 10 April 1963
- Genre: Chanson
- Length: 4:03
- Label: Barclay
- Songwriters: Jacques Brel; Gérard Jouannest; Jean Corti

Les Vieux (The Old Folks) is a 1963 song written and performed by Jacques Brel. It appeared on the album Les Bigotes and was co-composed with Brel's frequent collaborative musicians Gérard Jouannest and Jean Corti.

== Lyrics ==
The song is a melancholic account about old people who spend their final days in an old folks' home. They are lonely, lethargic and lost all their illusions. The refrain describes how they watch the pendulum of the clock swinging back and forth, which is mimicked in the musical arrangement. As much as they try to resist their old age death remains inevitable.

== Covers ==
The song has been covered in French by artists like Bruno Brel, Flossie Malavialle, Tom Mega, Vadim Piankov, Têtes Raides and Jacques Grillot. Dutch-language versions have been recorded by Liesbeth List, Jasperina de Jong, Arie Cupé, Mich en Scène and Frank Cools (in Dutch as De Oudjes) and Herman van den Berg (in Afrikaans as Die Grysaards). German-language covers were recorded by Michael Heltau, Dirk Schäfer and Klaus Hoffmann. An Italian cover was recorded by Renato Dibi and Duilio Del Prete.

Mort Shuman released an English-language version named The Old Folks, which has been covered by respectively Jennifer, Laurika Rauch, Richard Anthony, Donald Cant, John Denver and Camille O'Sullivan. The song also appeared in the 1968 Broadway show Jacques Brel is Alive and Well and Living in Paris. In the film version Jacques Brel Is Alive and Well and Living in Paris (1968) it is performed by Elly Stone.
