= Shawn Elliott (actor) =

Puerto Rican actor, singer, recording artist (1937–2016)

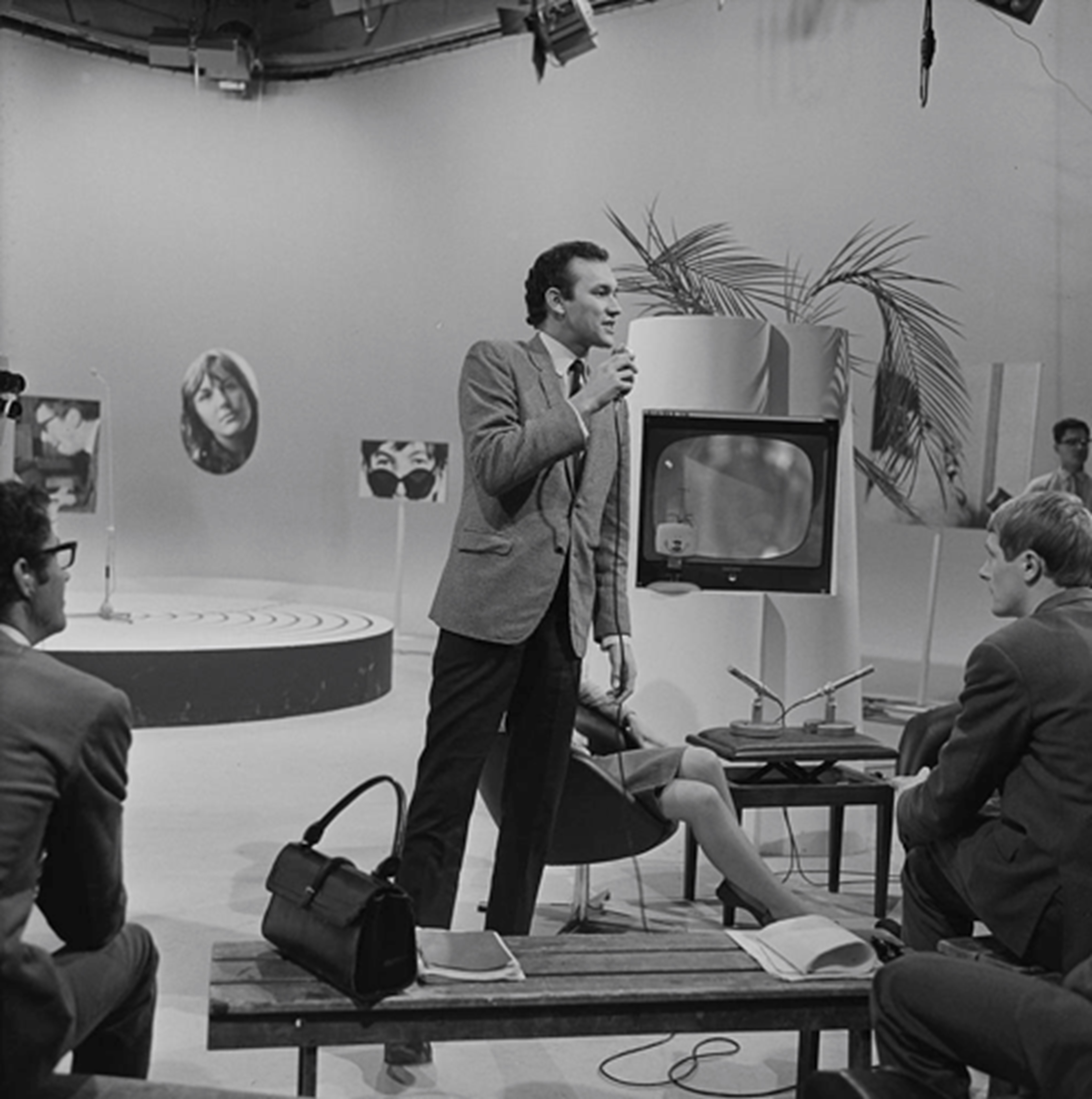
- Shawn Elliott (Dutch TV, 1965)
- Born: Eliezer Santiago Solis; February 24, 1937; Santurce, Puerto Rico
- Died: March 11, 2016 (aged 79); New York City, U.S.
- Occupations: Actor, singer
- Years active: 1955–2016
- Spouse: Donna Murphy (m. 1990)
- Children: 3

Shawn Elliott (February 24, 1937 – March 11, 2016) was an American actor and singer. He is best known for starring in the original cast of Jacques Brel is Alive and Well and Living in Paris onstage and as Paco in the film Short Eyes (1977).

== Early years ==
Elliott was born Eliezer Santiago Solis in Santurce, Puerto Rico, and grew up in New York City's East Harlem area where he appeared in a community center production of Oklahoma!

== Singing career ==
Elliott had a No. 1 hit in Europe and South America with a cover of Sir Lancelot's "Shame and Scandal in the Family" in 1965. The cover failed to chart in America where English comedian Lance Percival's version did. However, Peter Tosh and the Wailers, as well as the Blues Busters, copied the arrangement used by Elliot in preparing their own later covers of the song. Elliott recorded a minor disco hit "Nice and Slow" in 1976.

Elliott originally recorded for Roulette Records, before moving with his brother Roland to Atlantic Records in 1968, although none of his later records matched the success of his 1965 hit.

=== Selected discography ===
- "Goodbye My Lover", 1962
- "Sincerely and Tenderly", 1963
- "Shame and Scandal in the Family"; B-side "Josephine", 1964
- "You Opened Up My Eyes", 1967
- "You've Turned Away", 1968
- "Little Children", 1968
- "I Found Myself a Brand New Baby", 1970
- "Marieke"
- "Child Is Father of the Man", 1971
- "Mr. Love", 1976

== Acting career ==
After his last single, Elliott turned increasingly to acting. He is known for his roles in the films Short Eyes, Beat Street,Crossover Dreams, Do the Right Thing, Impulse, 13 Conversations About One Thing, Double Take, and Arbitrage. His last screen credit was the 2013 film Broken City.

On TV, Elliott played Eduardo Fernandez, father of main characters Alex and Gaby, on the PBS children's show Ghostwriter. He also appeared in episodes of NBC's Law & Order, Lifetime's The Days and Nights of Molly Dodd, Miami Vice, CSI: Miami and American Family.

Elliott also appeared on Broadway in City of Angels (1989) and Marie Christine (1999) and off-Broadway and regionally in Jacques Brel is Alive and Well and Living in Paris, Cyrano De Bergerac, Senor Discretion Himself, Teresa's Ecstasy, Hamlet, Who's Afraid of Virginia Woolf?, and Man of La Mancha. A lifetime member of The Actors Studio, Elliott received a 1998 ALMA Award for Outstanding Latino Cast for PBS' Foto-Novelas. In 2000, he was honored with the Rita Moreno Award for Excellence by the Hispanic Organization of Latin Artists (HOLA).

== Personal life ==
Elliott married actress Donna Murphy in 1990. Elliott has two daughters from a previous relationship, Ivy Kaller and Justine McLaughlin. In 2006, Elliott and Murphy adopted a daughter, Darmia Hope Murphy Elliott.

== Death ==
Elliott died from cancer in New York City on March 11, 2016, at age 79.

== Filmography ==
Year	Title	Role	Notes
1975	Jacques Brel Is Alive and Well and Living in Paris	'Madeleine'	Voice
1977	Short Eyes	Paco	
1984	Beat Street	Domingo	
1985	Crossover Dreams	Orlando	
1986	Off Beat	Hector	
1988	The Dead Pool	Chester Docksteder	
1989	Do the Right Thing	Puerto Rican Icee Man	
1990	Impulse	Tony Peron	
1991	Bloodsucking Pharaohs in Pittsburgh		
1992-1995	Ghostwriter	Eduardo Fernandez	
1996	Caught	Santiago	
1997	Hurricane Streets	Paco	
1998	Le New Yorker	Farrakhan	
2000	Blue Moon	The Ambassador	
2001	Double Take	Thomas Chela / Minty Gutierrez	
2001	Thirteen Conversations About One Thing	Mickey Wheeler	
2005	La fiesta del Chivo	Johnny Abbes	
2012	Arbitrage	Flores	
2013	Broken City	Raul Barea	(final film role)
