= Marieke (song) =

1962 song by Jacques Brel

- 7" vinyl single cover

Song by Jacques Brel

from the album Marieke
- Released: 1961
- Recorded: April 12, 1961
- Genre: Chanson
- Length: 2:40
- Label: Philips
- Songwriters: Jacques Brel, Gérard Jouannest

"Marieke" is a 1961 song by the Belgian singer Jacques Brel.

== The song ==
In "Marieke" Brel sings about a Flemish girl, Marieke, whom he once loved and who lived "between the towers of Bruges and Ghent". He wants her to love him again in the "flat country of Flanders" (a reference to another song by him, "Le Plat Pays").

It is the only song where he sings both in his native French language and in Dutch, the other major language of his bilingual home country Belgium. Brel recorded a version of the song entirely in Dutch as well, with lyrics by Eric Franssen.

== Covers ==
"Marieke" has been covered numerous times, among others by Marie Bill, Hans de Booij, Donald Cant, Judy Collins, Shawn Elliott, Jure Ivanušič, Elly Stone, Chad Mitchell, Mort Shuman, Alice Whitfield, Amanda McBroom, Des de Moor, Barb Jungr, Liza Minnelli, Danièle Pascal, Laurika Rauch, Laïs, Karin Hougard, Klaus Hoffman, Herman van Veen, Evabritt Strandberg, Michael Heltau, Gay Marshall, etc.

Brel told singers who covered "Marieke" that he didn't mind that they changed the French lyrics, but preferred the Dutch lyrics to remain intact.

== Statue ==
In 1988 a statue was created by Jef Claerhout depicting Marieke.
