= Karen Akers =

American actress and singer (born 1945)

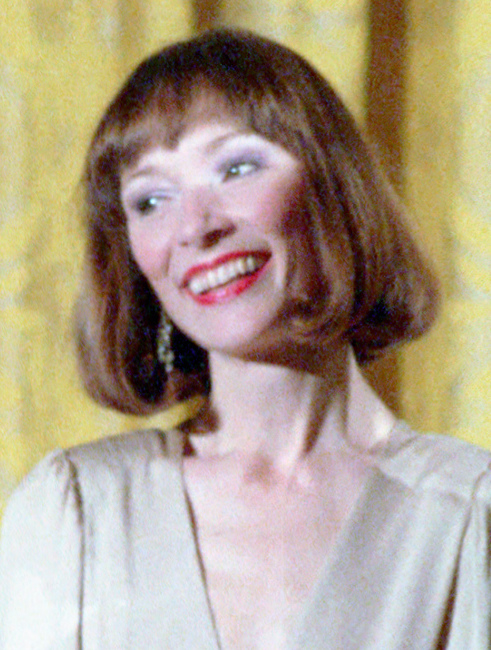
- Akers in 1985
- Born: October 13, 1945 (age 80); New York City
- Education: Hunter College
- Years active: 1982–present
- Spouses: Jim Akers (m. 1968 – mid-1980s); Kevin Power (m. 1993)
- Children: 2
- Website: karenakers.com

Karen Akers (born October 13, 1945) is an American actress and singer, who has appeared on Broadway, and in cabaret and film.

== Early years ==
Born on October 13, 1945, in New York City, Akers is the daughter of Heinrick C. Orth-Pallavicini, an insurance consultant, and Mary Orth-Pallavicini, a hospital chaplain. Her father was European, and her grandmother was Russian. Raised on the Upper East Side of Manhattan, she attended Manhattanville College and is a graduate of Hunter College.

== Career ==
Akers's professional career began in 1970 in supper clubs in Washington. She honed her acting skills as an amateur performer, starting in The Arlington Players' production of Jacques Brel is Alive and Well and Living in Paris.

In 1978 Christian Blackwood saw Akers performing and invited her to tape a program for German television in Hamburg. The result, "Karen Akers: A Voice From New York", was "enthusiastically received at the Montreux Film Festival" and was later broadcast in the United States on PBS as Presenting Karen Akers.

Akers first appeared on Broadway in the original production of Nine, a musical directed by Tommy Tune and based on the Federico Fellini film 8½, as Luisa Contini, the wife of promiscuous film director Guido Contini (played by Raúl Juliá). The show opened May 9, 1982, and had a successful run of 732 performances, closing February 4, 1984. Akers won a Theatre World Award for her performance. She was one of three actresses in the show nominated for the Tony Award for Best Featured Actress in a Musical, with the award eventually going to fellow cast member Liliane Montevecchi.

Beginning in 1985, Akers appeared in such feature films as Woody Allen's The Purple Rose of Cairo (as a celluloid chanteuse), and in Heartburn (as the mistress of Jack Nicholson's character).

In the mid-1980s Akers performed in the one-woman show An Evening With Karen Akers.

She appeared on Broadway in Grand Hotel, a musical adaptation of the novel and film, scored by Robert Wright, George Forrest, and Maury Yeston. In Grand Hotel Akers was reunited with Nine director Tommy Tune and Nine cast members Liliane Motevecchi and Kathi Moss. The show opened November 12, 1989, for a run of 1,018 performances, through April 19, 1992.

Akers covered "Sooner or Later" in her 1991 album Unchained Melodies, a song written for Madonna by Stephen Sondheim the year before.

Akers is bilingual, singing in French and in English.

== Personal life ==
Akers married Jim Akers in 1968,. a union which yielded two sons, and ended in divorce.

On September 19, 1993, Akers married Kevin Patrick Power, vice president of the satellite communications company Orion Network Systems, in a Roman Catholic ceremony at St. Paul's Chapel of Columbia University in New York.

As of April 2000, Akers was living in London.

== Filmography ==
=== Film ===
Year	Title	Role	Notes
1985	The Purple Rose of Cairo	Kitty Haynes	Also on the soundtrack, uncredited, performing "One Day at a Time".
1986	Heartburn	Thelma Rice	
1988	Vibes	Hillary	(final film role)

=== Television ===
Year	Title	Role	Notes
1984	Hart to Hart	Raquel Moskowitz	Episode: "Whispers in the Wings"
1985	The Equalizer	Cynthia	Episode: "China Rain"
1987	Cheers	Sally	Episode: "My Fair Clavin"
1991	Today	Herself	Episode: 5 November 1991
1983–1997	Great Performances	Herself	Episodes: "Ellington: The Music Lives On" (1983); "Ira Gershwin at 100: A Celebration at Carnegie Hall" (1997)

=== DVD Concert Films ===
- 2005: Karen Akers: On Stage at Wolf Trap

== Partial discography ==
- 1981: Presenting Karen Akers - Blackwood Records BLWD 001
- 1982: Karen Akers - Rizzoli/Blackwood Records 1001
- 1987: In A Very Unusual Way - Rizzoli Records 1004/71004
- reissue 1999 In A Very Unusual Way - Cabaret 5002
- 1994: Just Imagine - DRG 5231
- 1996: Under Paris Skies - Cabaret Records 5019
- 1997: Live from Rainbow and Stars - DRG 1450
- 2001: Feels Like Home - DRG 1465
- 2004: If We Only Have Love - DRG 1383
- 2006: Like It Was - DRG CD 91498
- 2008: Simply Styne - DRG 1506
