= Eric Blau =

American dramatist (1921–2009)

- Born: Milton Eric Blau; June 1, 1921; Bridgeport, Connecticut, U.S.
- Died: February 17, 2009 (aged 87); New York City, U.S.
- Education: City College of New York
- Occupation: Author
- Children: 3
- Writing career
- Notable work: Jacques Brel is Alive and Well and Living in Paris
- Notable awards: Edgar Award

Milton Eric Blau (June 1, 1921 – February 17, 2009) was an author and is best known as the creator of the Off Broadway show Jacques Brel is Alive and Well and Living in Paris.

== Biography ==
Blau was born in Bridgeport, Connecticut, on June 1, 1921, to Hungarian Jewish immigrants who were residents of Manhattan's Lower East Side. He attended the City College of New York, which he left before graduating following an argument with a professor about William Shakespeare. Blau served in Europe during World War II in the United States Army Signal Corps, where he wrote poems for French journals that he had translated into French.

After completing his military service, he founded the journal Masses and Mainstream and worked as a writer and in public relations. He was a ghostwriter for sports instruction booklets on behalf of basketball player Bob Cousy and baseball's Roger Maris. Together with cartoonist Roy Doty, he created The Adventures of Danny Dee, an early show for children with animation that broadcast starting in 1953 on the New York City affiliate of the DuMont Television Network.

Although the similarity was lost as he grew older, Blau had an uncanny resemblance to Groucho Marx, and would often be approached by fans of the comedian.

Among the books he authored was The hero of the Slocum disaster, an historical novel exploring the infamous 1904 sinking of the General Slocum. He received the Edgar Allan Poe Award for the mystery novel The Keys to Billy Tillio.

== Jacques Brel ==
Blau was introduced to the music of Belgian singer-songwriter Jacques Brel by his wife, Elly Stone, who had first heard Brel's music through an acquaintance at a record company. Blau became infatuated with Brel's work and started translating his songs. Some of Blau's initial work appeared in O, Oysters!, a musical revue.

Together with composer Mort Shuman, Blau came up with the concept of a play that would feature a night of Brel's songs, and the two worked together to translate the songs into English and add material to wrap around the music.

Jacques Brel is Alive and Well and Living in Paris featured Shuman and Stone as part of a cast of four. The play debuted at The Village Gate in early 1968 and ran for more than four years. Thereafter, it was performed by what may be thousands of theaters around the world.

=== Personal ===
Blau wrote a number of works of poetry, novels and plays, but never again achieved the success of Jacques Brel. He was never affected by the disappointments, with his son Matthew noting that he had many ideas and "was a man who moved on."

A resident of Manhattan, Blau died there at age 87 on February 17, 2009, due to pneumonia, which he contracted following a stroke. He was survived by his wife, three sons, four grandchildren and a great-granddaughter. His first marriage had ended in divorce.
