= François Rauber =

François Rauber (19 January 1933 – 14 December 2003) was a French pianist, composer, arranger and conductor known for his works with chansonnier Jacques Brel. He served as the music director for the 1975 film Jacques Brel Is Alive and Well and Living in Paris.

Rauber was born in Neufchâteau, Vosges and studied music at the Nancy Conservatoire and the Conservatoire de Paris.

Rauber is also the composer of the Napoleonic March in the Colonel Chabert French movie by Yves Angelo.

In 1979 Rauber was awarded the Grand Prize for Light Symphonic Music. During the 1980s and early 1990s, he worked extensively with Portuguese singer-songwriter Fernando Tordo and served as arranger and conductor in some of his records. In 2003, he was awarded the Chanson Française Grand Prize.

Preceded by (United Kingdom) Ronnie Hazlehurst	Eurovision Song Contest conductor 1978	Succeeded by (Israel) Izhak Graziani
