= Elly Stone =

American singer and actress (1927–2020)

Elly Stone (May 30, 1927 – June 11, 2020) was an American singer and actress best known for her interpretations of the music of Jacques Brel.

== Biography ==
Stone was born in Brooklyn, New York, and attended the High School of Music & Art in Manhattan. She began her career in the 1950s, singing in a variety of off-beat venues ranging from a carnival to a burlesque show. She played Carnegie Hall in 1957 as part of a "Folk Jamboree", with Sonny Terry, Earl Robinson and others, and in 1958 with musical satirist Tom Lehrer. In 1962, she was Barbra Streisand's understudy for the Broadway musical I Can Get It for You Wholesale.

In 1968, she achieved recognition as one of the stars of the off-Broadway revue Jacques Brel is Alive and Well and Living in Paris, which was co-written by her husband, Eric Blau. Stone stayed with the off-Broadway production for two years, and appeared with Brel in a 1970 French television special. She later starred in the 1972 Broadway incarnation of Jacques Brel is Alive and Well and Living in Paris and in the 1975 motion picture version, produced by the American Film Theatre.

Although she appeared in other theatrical productions and enjoyed success as a cabaret and concert headliner, including a 1980 concert at Carnegie Hall in New York City celebrating her 25th anniversary in the entertainment industry, Stone's identification with Brel remained strong. In 2006, she provided an off-Broadway revival of the revue Jacques Brel is Alive and Well and Living in Paris with previously unseen English-language translations by Eric Blau of Brel's music.

"Jacques Brel's music is effective because it deals with the most basic of human passions", said Stone in a 2008 interview with the Marin Independent Journal. "It's all about the human condition. When you're dealing with something like that, it's not bound by time. It makes people feel."

Stone made various recordings in her career. Besides the Jacques Brel... original cast and soundtrack recordings, she released Elly Stone on Columbia Records. She also recorded a variety of "Jewish Folk Songs" on the Tikva label in which she sang and played guitar. In the late 1970s, she released an album on Eebee Records entitled The Spirit of 76.

Stone died of complications from endometrial cancer while living with her son Matthew Blau in Ecuador. Blau told the New York Times that "in her 60s she began experimenting with LSD-assisted psychotherapy to combat anxiety and became an advocate of that treatment."
