= Gérard Jouannest =

French pianist and composer

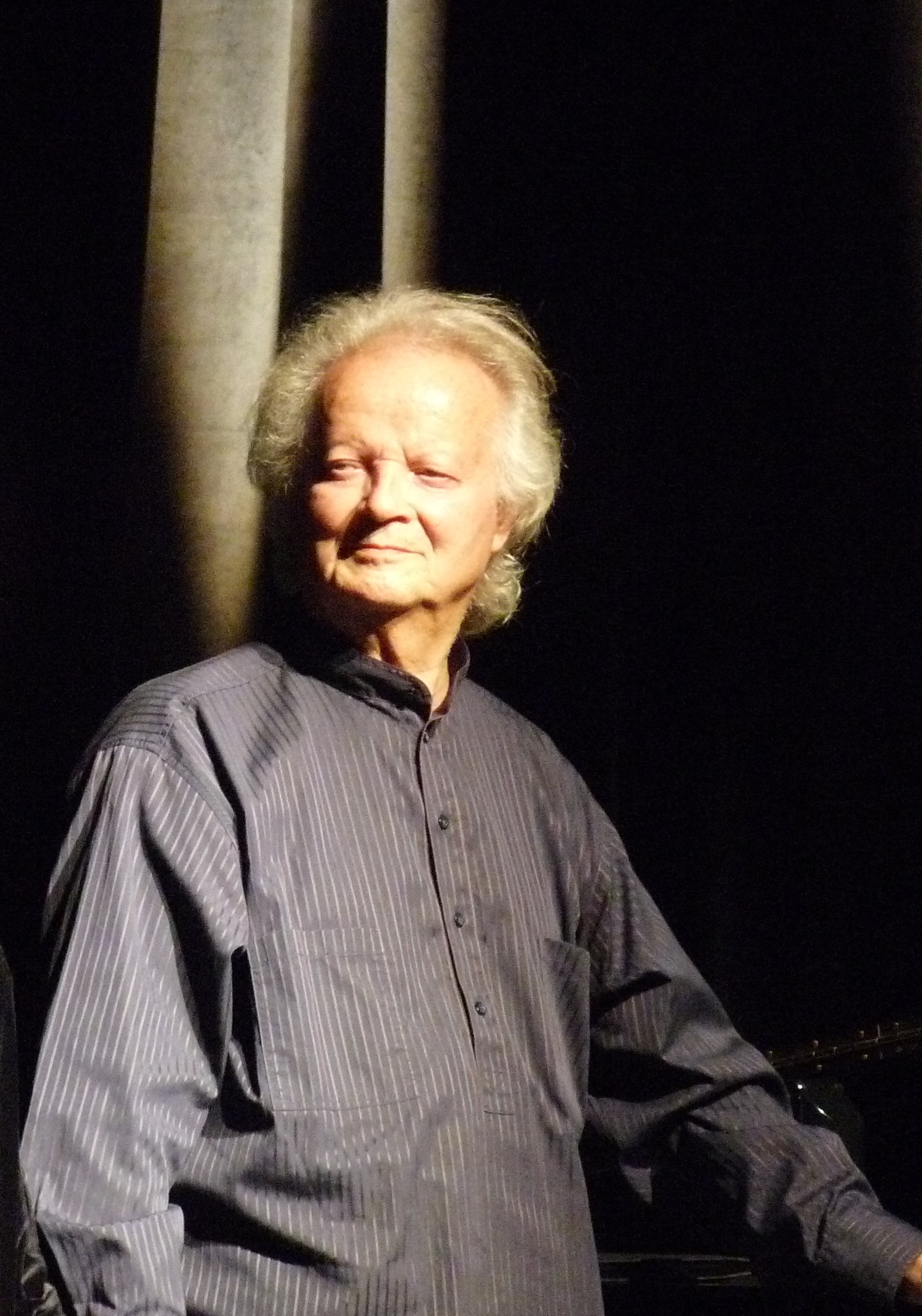
- Jouannest in 2011
- Born: 2 May 1933; Vanves, Hauts-de-Seine, France
- Died: 16 May 2018 (aged 85); Ramatuelle, Var, France
- Education: Conservatoire de Paris
- Occupations: Pianist, composer
- Spouse: Juliette Gréco (m. 1988)

Gérard Jouannest (2 May 1933 – 16 May 2018) was a French pianist and composer. He was best known for his collaborations with Jacques Brel, both as a performer and composer, and later with Juliette Gréco, whom he married in 1988.

== Early life ==
Jouannest was born on 2 May 1933 in Vanves near Paris. His father was a piano manufacturer.

Jouannest graduated from the Conservatoire de Paris in 1954. During the Algerian War, he served in the French Army, although he was based in Meknes, Morocco.

== Career ==
Jouannest began his career as a pianist in music halls. He later worked as a pianist for François Rauber. In 1959, he was introduced to Jacques Brel by music producer Jacques Canetti, and he worked for Brel for nearly a decade. It was Brel who introduced Jouannest to his future wife, singer Juliette Gréco in 1968, and Jouannest played the piano for Greco during the rest of his career.

Jouannest composed more than 250 songs over the course of his life. For example, he composed classic songs for Jacques Brel like "Ne me quitte pas", "Ces gens-là", "Bruxelles", "Mathilde" and "Les Vieux". He also composed songs for younger artists like Miossec, Benjamin Biolay and Abd al Malik.

== Personal life and death ==
In 1988, Jouannest married Juliette Gréco. Jouannest supported Jean-Luc Mélenchon in the 2012 presidential election.

Jouannest died on 16 May 2018 in Ramatuelle, in the South of France. He was 85.
