= Jacques Brel discography =

Discography of Belgian singer-songwriter Jacques Brel

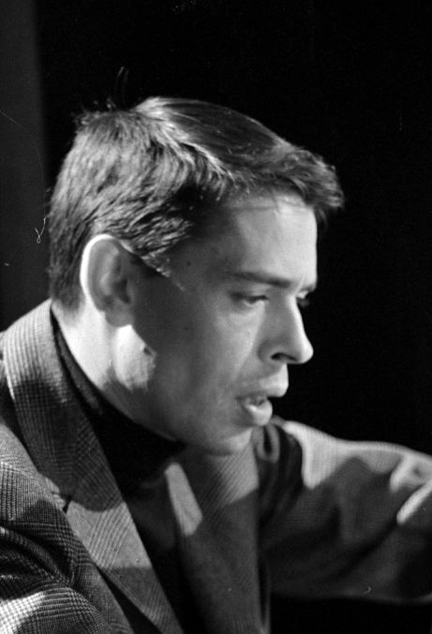
- Brel in 1963
- Studio albums: 16
- Soundtrack albums: 1
- Live albums: 8
- Notable compilations: 4

Jacques Brel's career spanned over three decades and encompassed a number of singles, EPs, 10-inch albums and 12-inch LPs. His songs were often repackaged and resold under different covers and titles, which makes compiling a complete collection of Brel's recordings a difficult task. This discography brings together Brel's original studio albums, live albums, singles and EPs, as well as notable compilations and live albums.

To date, Brel's albums are reported to sell over 200,000 copies per year.

== Studio albums ==
Although Brel's discography has been released in many permutations and under different titles, the below discography lists the album titles according to their original cover art with notable alternative titles presented in brackets.

=== With Philips Records ===
Year	Title	Format
1954	Et ses chansons – 1ère série	10", 25 cm vinyl
1957	2e série (Quand on n'a que l'Amour)	10", 25 cm vinyl
1958	N° 3 (Au printemps)	10", 25 cm vinyl
1959	N° 4 (La Valse à mille temps)	10", 25 cm vinyl
1961	N° 5 (Marieke)	10", 25 cm vinyl

=== With Barclay Records ===
Year	Title	Format
1962	Jacques Brel (Madeleine)	10", 25 cm vinyl
1963	Jacques Brel (Les Bigotes)	10", 25 cm vinyl
1964	Jacques Brel (Jef)	10", 25 cm vinyl
1965	Jacques Brel (Ces gens-là)	10", 25 cm vinyl
1967	Jacques Brel 67	12", 30 cm vinyl
1968	J'arrive	12", 30 cm vinyl
1968	L'Homme de la Mancha	12", 30 cm vinyl
1972	Ne me quitte pas	12", 30 cm vinyl
1977	Les Marquises (Brel)	12", 30 cm vinyl
2013	Versions alternatives inédites	10", 25 cm vinyl

== Compilation albums ==
The majority of these notable compilations contain songs released previously on Brel's 10-inch albums. These include compilations which are often repackaged as original albums in compilations such as Boîte à bonbons and Suivre l'etoile. Brel's 12-inch LPs before 1967's Jacques Brel 67 are all compilations.

Year	Title	Format
1962	Les Bourgeois	12-inch vinyl
1966	Les Bonbons	12-inch vinyl
1966	Ces gens-là	12-inch vinyl
1967	Enregistrement Public	12-inch vinyl, part live

== Live albums ==
Year	Title	Format
1962	Olympia 1961	12-inch vinyl
1964	Olympia '64	10-inch vinyl, part concert
1993	À Knokke	CD
1998	En Scènes	CD
2003	Intégralité des enregistrements radio de 1953	CD
2003	Olympia 1964	CD
2013	Les Adieux à L'Olympia	CD
2013	Le Dernier concert, Roubaix 1967	CD

== Singles ==
These singles are 45 rpm unless otherwise indicated.

=== With Philips Records ===
Year	Tracks	Album
1954	"Il peut pleuvoir"/"C'est comme ça": 78rpm	Jacques Brel et ses chansons
1955	"Les Pieds dans le ruisseau"/"S'il te faut": 78rpm	Quand on n'a que l'amour
1955	"Sur la place"/"Grand Jacques"/"Ça Va"/"La Haine"	Jacques Brel et ses chansons
1956	"Qu'Avons-nous fait bonnes gens?"/"Les Pieds dans le ruisseau"/"S'il te faut"/"Il peut pleuvoir"/"Il nous faut regarder"/"La Bastille"	Quand on n'a que l'amour
1956	"Quand on n'a Que l'Amour"/"Les Blés"/"Dites, si c'était vrai (poème)"/"Saint-Pierre"/"Prière Païenne"	Quand on n'a que l'amour, N° 3
1958	"L'Air de la bêtise"/"Pardons"/"Heureux"/"La Bourrée Du célibataire"	Quand on n'a que l'amour
1958	"La Lumière jaillira"/"L'Homme dans la cité"/"Demain l'on se Marie (La Chanson Des Fiancés)"/"Voici"	N° 3
1958	"Je ne sais pas"/"Voir"/"Au printemps"/"l'Aventure"	N° 3
1960	"La Valse à mille temps"/"La Tendresse"/"Ne me quitte pas"/"La Dame patronnesse"	N° 4
1960	"Les Flamandes"/"Seul"/"Isabelle"/"La Colombe"	N° 4
1960	"Ne me quitte pas"/"Dors ma mie"/"Seul"/"Litanies pour un retour"	N° 3, N° 4
1961	"Le Moribond"/"On n'oublie rien"/"l'Ivrogne"	N° 5
1961	"Marieke"/"Clara"/"Le Prochain amour"/"Les Prenoms de Paris"	N° 5
1962	"Les Bourgeois"/"Les Paumés du petit matin"/"Madeleine"/"Les Singes"	Jacques Brel (Les Bourgeois)

=== With Barclay Records ===
Year	Tracks	Album
1962	"Les Paumes du petit matin"/"Zangra"/Madeleine/"Rosa"	Jacques Brel (Les Bourgeois)
1962	"Les Bourgeois"/"Bruxelles"/"La Statue"/"Une Ile"	Jacques Brel (Les Bourgeois)
1962	"Le Plat Pays"/"Casse Pompon"/"Les Biches"	Jacques Brel (Les Bourgeois)
1962	"Rosa"/"Une Ile"	Jacques Brel (Les Bourgeois)
1962	"Les Bigotes"/"Quand maman reviendra"/"Les Filles et les chiens"/ "La Parlote": Two variations of this single exist, the first pressing comprising demo recordings of the songs.	Jacques Brel (Les Bourgeois)
1963	"Les Toros"/"Les Vieux": Also released with the A and B side reversed.	Les Bonbons
1963	"La Fanette"/"J'Aimais"	Les Bonbons
1963	"Les Toros"/"Les Vieux"/"La Fanette"/"Les Fenetres"	Les Bonbons
1963	"Les Bonbons"/"Au Suivant"	Les Bonbons
1964	"Jef"/"Les Bonbons"/"Le Dernier Repas"/"Au Suivant"	Les Bonbons
1964	"Mathilde"/"Tango funebre"/"Les Bergers"/"Titine"	Les Bonbons
1964	"Amsterdam/"Les Jardins du casino"	Olympia 1964
1964	"Amsterdam"/"Les Timides"/"Les Jardins du Casino"	Olympia 1964
1965	"Jacky"/""Ces gens-là": Also released with A and B side reversed.	Ces gens-là
1965	"Ces gens-là"/"Jacky"/"L'Age idiot"	Ces gens-là
1965	"Fernand"/"Grand-Mere"/"Les Desesperes"	Ces gens-là
1966	"Mijn vlakke land"/"De Burgerij"	Les Bourgeois
1967	"La, la, la"/"Le Gaz"	Jacques Brel 67
1967	"Mon enfance"/"Le Gaz"/"Mon pere disait"	Jacques Brel 67
1967	"Les Bonbons 67"/"La Chanson des vieux amants"	Jacques Brel 67
1967	"La Chanson des vieux amants"/"Les Bonbons 67"/"Fils de..."/"Les Coeurs tendres"	Jacques Brel 67
1968	"Vesoul"/"Un Enfant"/"La Biere"/"Je suis un soir d'ete"	J'Arrive
1978	"Les Remparts De Varsovie"/"Jojo"	Les Marquises
1978	"Orly"/"Le Lion"	Les Marquises
