= Chansons ou versions inédites de jeunesse =

Studio album by Jacques Brel
- Released: 23 September 2003
- Recorded: 14 August 1953, 21 August 1953, 1962
- Genre: Chanson
- Length: 65:20
- Label: Barclay

Chansons ou versions inédites de jeunesse (Early Unreleased Songs or Versions) is an album of Jacques Brel rare early recordings first issued as part of the 16-CD box set Boîte à bonbons on 23 September 2003. This CD contains 28 titles: 26 songs from Radio Hasselt recorded 14 August 1953 and 21 August 1953, a recording from the Brel family's private collection, and a 1962 recording from Dutch television AVRO.

== Track listing ==
| Track | Title | Possible translation | Composer | Recorded |
|---|---|---|---|---|
| 1 | "À deux" | In Two | Jacques Brel | 1953-08 |
| 2 | "Dites, si c'était vrai (poème)" | Say, If That Were True (Poem) | Jacques Brel | 1953-08 |
| 3 | "Les Gens" | The People | Jacques Brel | 1953-08 |
| 4 | "La Haine" | The Hatred | Jacques Brel | 1953-08 |
| 5 | "Départs" | Departures | Jacques Brel | 1953-08 |
| 6 | "Le Diable (Ça Va)" | The Devil (It's Fine) | Jacques Brel | 1953-08 |
| 7 | "Qu'Avons-nous fait, bonnes gens ?" | What Have We Done, Good People? | Jacques Brel | 1953-08 |
| 8 | "L'Ange déchu" | The Fallen Angel | Jacques Brel | 1953-08 |
| 9 | "Les pieds dans le ruisseau" | Trailing my Feet in the Stream | Jacques Brel | 1953-08 |
| 10 | "La Bastille" | The Bastille | Jacques Brel | 1953-08 |
| 11 | "Ce qu'il nous faut" | What We Need | Jacques Brel | 1953-08 |
| 12 | "L'Accordéon de la vie" | The Accordion of Life | Jacques Brel | 1953-08 |
| 13 | "Je suis l'ombre des chansons" | I Am the Shadow of Songs | Jacques Brel | 1953-08 |
| 14 | "S'il te faut" | If You Need | Jacques Brel | 1953-08 |
| 15 | "Ballade" | Ballad | Jacques Brel | 1953-08 |
| 16 | "L'Orage" | The Storm | Jacques Brel | 1953-08 |
| 17 | "Les Pavés" | Paving Stones | Jacques Brel | 1953-08 |
| 18 | "Le Fou du roi" | The Jester | Jacques Brel | 1953-08 |
| 19 | "La Foire" | The Fair | Jacques Brel | 1953-08 |
| 20 | "Sur la place" | On the Square | Jacques Brel | 1953-08 |
| 21 | "Il peut pleuvoir" | It May Rain | Jacques Brel | 1953-08 |
| 22 | "Les deux fauteuils" | The Two Chairs | Jacques Brel | 1953-08 |
| 23 | "Les Enfants du roi" | Children of the King | Jacques Brel | 1953-08 |
| 24 | "Le Troubadour" | The Troubadour | Jacques Brel | 1953-08 |
| 25 | "Il nous faut regarder" | We Need to Look | Jacques Brel | 1953-08 |
| 26 | "C'est comme ça" | That's How It Is | Jacques Brel | 1953-08 |
| 27 | "Si tu revenais" | If You'd Return | Jacques Brel | likely 1953 |
| 28 | "Le Pendu" | The Hanged Man | Jacques Brel | 1963 |

- Tracks 1–26 recorded on 14 August and 21 August 1953 at Radio Hasselt
- Track 27 recorded in 1953, for Swiss radio Radio Suisse Romande
- Track 28 recorded 20 February 1963 at Hilversum, Netherlands, for TV show 'Club Domino'. Broadcast 20 April 1963
- Tracks 4, 6, 10, 14, 18, 20, 21, 25, and 26 were re-recorded and released on Jacques Brel et ses chansons in 1954.
- Tracks 7 and 9 were re-recorded and released on Quand on n'a que l'amour in 1957.
- Track 2 was re-recorded and released on Au printemps in 1958.
