= Infiniment =

Compilation album by Jacques Brel
- Released: 30 September 2003
- Genre: Chanson
- Length: 77:56 (CD 1); 62:52 (CD 2)
- Label: Barclay/Universal

Infiniment (Infinitely) is a 2-CD compilation of Jacques Brel's best known songs. This compilation of remastered songs also contains 5 unpublished titles from the recording session of the album Les Marquises: "La cathédrale", "L'amour est mort", "Mai 40", "Avec élégance", and "Sans exigences". A booklet is included with the lyrics of the 5 new titles. Infiniment was released on 30 September 2003 to mark the 25th anniversary of Brel's death.

== Track listing ==
CD 1

1. "La quête"
2. "La cathédrale"
3. "L'amour est mort"
4. "Mai 40"
5. "Avec élégance"
6. "Sans exigences"
7. "Les Marquises"
8. "Orly"
9. "La ville s'endormait"
10. "Jojo"
11. "J'arrive"
12. "Quand on n'a que l'amour"
13. "Le Plat Pays"
14. "Mon enfance"
15. "Les vieux"
16. "La chanson de Jacky"
17. "La valse à mille temps"
18. "Le prochain amour"
19. "La chanson des vieux amants"
20. "Ne me quitte pas"

CD 2

1. "Amsterdam"
2. "La bière"
3. "Bruxelles"
4. "Le diable 'ça va'"
5. "Il nous faut regarder"
6. "L'enfance"
7. "Ces gens-là"
8. "Les bonbons"
9. "Les flamandes"
10. "Les bourgeois"
11. "Jef"
12. "Mathilde"
13. "Marieke"
14. "Madeleine"
15. "Les bigotes"
16. "Vesoul"
17. "Le Moribond"
18. "Au suivant"
19. "Le dernier repas"
20. "Je suis un soir d'été"

== Charts ==
=== Weekly charts ===
Chart (2003–2019)	Peak position
Belgian Albums (Ultratop Flanders)	6
Belgian Albums (Ultratop Wallonia)	1
Dutch Albums (Album Top 100)	19
Portuguese Albums (AFP)	7
Swiss Albums (Schweizer Hitparade)	16

=== Year-end charts ===
Chart (2003)	Position
Belgian Albums (Ultratop Flanders)	46
Belgian Albums (Ultratop Wallonia)	11
Chart (2004)	Position
Belgian Albums (Ultratop Wallonia)	84
