= Les Bonbons (album) =

Compilation album by Jacques Brel
- Released: 1966
- Recorded: 2 April 1963–9 January 1964
- Genre: Chanson
- Length: 47:00
- Label: Barclay; Universal

Jacques Brel chronology
Mathilde (1964)	Les Bonbons (1966)	Ces gens-là (1966)

Les Bonbons (English: The candies) is a compilation album by Jacques Brel. Also known as Les Vieux, Jacques Brel Accompagné par François Rauber et Son Orchestre, and Encore, the album was released in 1966 by Barclay. The original 1966 album was itself a composite of two earlier 10" releases, one from 1963 and one from 1964. The album was reissued on 23 September 2003 under the title Les Bonbons as part of the 16-CD box set Boîte à bonbons by Barclay (980 817-0).

== Track listing ==
Track	Title	Translation	Composer	Recorded
1	"Les Bonbons"	I Brought Candy	Jacques Brel	1964-01-07
2	"Les Vieux"	Old Folks	Jacques Brel, Jean Corti, Gérard Jouannest	1963-04-10
3	"La Parlote"	Chitchat	Jacques Brel, Gérard Jouannest	1963-04-02
4	"Le Dernier repas"	The Last Supper	Jacques Brel	1964-01-08
5	"Titine"	Titine	Jacques Brel, Jean Corti, Gérard Jouannest	1964-03-07
6	"Au suivant"	Next	Jacques Brel	1964-01-09
7	"Les Toros"	The Bulls	Jacques Brel, Jean Corti, Gérard Jouannest	1963-04-03
8	"La Fanette"	Fanette	Jacques Brel	1963-04-03
9	"J'aimais"	I Loved	Jacques Brel, Gérard Jouannest	1963-04-10
10	"Les Filles et les chiens"	The Girls and the Dogs	Jacques Brel, Gérard Jouannest	1963-04-03
11	"Les bigotes"	Churchgoing Women	Jacques Brel	1963-04-10
12	"Les fenêtres"	Windows	Jacques Brel, Gérard Jouannest	1963-04-02
13	"Quand Maman reviendra"	When Mother Comes Back	Jacques Brel	1963-04-02
14	"Les Amants de cœur"	The Lovers	Jacques Brel, Rod McKuen	1964-03-07

- Tracks 1–12 constituted the original 1966 album.
- Tracks 13–14 were added to the album when it was reissued as part of the 16-CD box set Boîte à bonbons.

== Personnel ==
- Jacques Brel – composer, vocals
- François Rauber – orchestra conductor
- Gerhardt Lehner – recording engineer & audio mixing (uncredited)
- Jean-Marie Guérin – mastering
- Gérard Jouannest – composer
- Hubert Grooteclaes – photography
- Pierre Fournier – photography

== Certifications and sales ==
Region	Certification	Certified units/sales
France (SNEP)	Gold	100,000^{*}
^{*} Sales figures based on certification alone.
