= Boîte à bonbons =

Box set by Jacques Brel
- Released: 23 September 2003
- Genre: Chanson
- Label: Barclay/Universal

Alternate box set
- Coffret intégral 2003 "Boîte velours"

Boîte à bonbons (Box of Candies) is a 16-CD box set compilation of the recorded songs of Jacques Brel. The limited edition box set was released to mark the 25th anniversary of Jacques Brel's death. The box set includes 15 albums remastered from the original records. CD digipacks are presented in their original sleeve with lyrics. The box set also includes an illustrated booklet with various pictures, a biography, and Brel's citations and testimonies. Also included are five never before released songs from the recording sessions of the album Les Marquises. Included with the booklet is a bonus CD containing 28 titles: 26 songs from Radio Hasselt recorded 14 and 21 August 1953, a recording from the Brel family's private collection, and a 1962 recording from the Dutch television show AVRO. The box set is also available in an alternate velvet box format with CDs in crystal cases.

== Track listing ==
CD 1 Grand Jacques (1955)

1. "La haine"
2. "Grand Jacques (C'est trop facile)"
3. "Il pleut 'Les carreaux'"
4. "Le diable 'Ca va'"
5. "Il peut pleuvoir"
6. "Il nous faut regarder"
7. "Le fou du roi"
8. "C'est comme ça"
9. "Sur la place"
10. "S'il te faut"
11. "La Bastille"
12. "Prière païenne"
13. "Il y a"
14. "La foire"
15. "Sur la place"

CD 2 Quand on n'a que l'amour (1957)

1. "Quand on a que l'amour"
2. "Qu'avons-nous fait, bonnes gens"
3. "Les pieds dans le ruisseau"
4. "Pardons"
5. "La bourrée du célibataire"
6. "L'air de la bêtise"
7. "Saint-Pierre"
8. "J'en appelle"
9. "Heureux"
10. "Les blés"
11. "Quand on n'a que l'amour"

CD 3 Au printemps (1958)

1. "Demain l'on se marie (La chanson des fiancés)"
2. "Au printemps"
3. "Je ne sais pas"
4. "Le colonel"
5. "Dors ma mie, bonsoir"
6. "La lumière jaillira"
7. "Dites, si c'était vrai (poème)"
8. "L'homme dans la cité"
9. "Litanies pour un retour"
10. "Voici"
11. "Voir"
12. "L'aventure"
13. "Dites, si c'était vrai (poème)"

CD 4 La Valse à mille temps (1959)

1. "La valse à mille temps"
2. "Seul"
3. "La dame patronnesse"
4. "Je t'aime"
5. "Ne me quitte pas"
6. "Les Flamandes"
7. "Isabelle"
8. "La mort"
9. "La tendresse"
10. "La colombe"

CD 5 Marieke (1961)

1. "Marieke"
2. "Le Moribond"
3. "Vivre debout"
4. "On n'oublie rien"
5. "Clara"
6. "Le prochain amour"
7. "L'ivrogne"
8. "Les prénoms de Paris"
9. "Les singes"
10. "Marieke" (in Dutch)
11. "Laat me niet alleen (Ne me quitte pas)"
12. "De apen (Les singes)"
13. "Men vergeet niets (On n'oublie rien)"
14. "Le prochain amour"

CD 6 Enregistrement Public à l'Olympia 1961 (1962)

1. "Introduction / Les prénoms de Paris"
2. "Les bourgeois"
3. "Les paumés du petit matin"
4. "Les Flamandes"
5. "La statue"
6. "Zangra"
7. "Marieke"
8. "Les biches"
9. "Madeleine"
10. "Les singes"
11. "L'ivrogne"
12. "La valse à mille temps"
13. "Ne me quitte pas"
14. "Le moribond"
15. "Quand on a que l'amour"

CD 7 Les Bourgeois (1962)

1. "Les bourgeois"
2. "Les paumés du petit matin"
3. "Le Plat Pays"
4. "Zangra"
5. "Une île"
6. "Madeleine"
7. "Bruxelles"
8. "Chanson sans paroles"
9. "Les biches"
10. "Le caporal Casse-Pompon"
11. "La statue"
12. "Rosa"
13. "Il neige sur Liège"
14. "Pourquoi faut-il que les hommes s'ennuient"

CD 8 Les Bonbons (1964)

1. "Les bonbons"
2. "Les vieux"
3. "La parlote"
4. "Le dernier repas"
5. "Titine"
6. "Au suivant"
7. "Les toros"
8. "La Fanette"
9. "J'aimais"
10. "Les filles et les chiens"
11. "Les bigotes"
12. "Les fenêtres"
13. "Quand maman reviendra"
14. "Les amants de cœur"

CD 9 Enregistrement Public à l'Olympia 1964 (1967)

1. "Amsterdam"
2. "Les timides"
3. "Le dernier repas"
4. "Les jardins du casino"
5. "Les vieux"
6. "Les toros"
7. "Tango funèbre"
8. "Le plat pays"
9. "Les bonbons"
10. "Mathilde"
11. "Les bigotes"
12. "Les bourgeois"
13. "Jef"
14. "Au suivant"
15. "Madeleine"

CD 10 Ces gens-là (1966)

1. "Ces gens-là"
2. "Jef"
3. "La chanson de Jacky"
4. "Les bergers"
5. "Le tango funèbre"
6. "Fernand"
7. "Mathilde"
8. "L'âge idiot"
9. "Grand-mère"
10. "Les désespérés"
11. "Mijn vlakke land (Le plat pays)"
12. "Rosa (in Dutch)"
13. "De burgerij (Les bourgeois)"
14. "De nuttelozen van de nacht (Les paumés du petit matin)"

CD 11 Jacques Brel 67 (1967)

1. "Mon enfance"
2. "Le cheval"
3. "Mon père disait"
4. "La… la… la…"
5. "Les cœurs tendres"
6. "Fils de…"
7. "Les bonbons 67"
8. "La chanson des vieux amants"
9. "À jeun"
10. "Le gaz"
11. "Les moutons"

CD 12 J'arrive (1968)

1. "J'arrive"
2. "Vesoul"
3. "L'Ostendaise"
4. "Je suis un soir d'été"
5. "Regarde bien petit"
6. "Comment tuer l'amant"
7. "L'éclusier"
8. "Un enfant"
9. "La bière"
10. "La chanson de Van Horst"
11. "L'enfance"

CD 13 L'Homme de la Mancha (1968)

1. "L'homme de la Mancha"
2. "Un animal"
3. "Dulcinea"
4. "Vraiment je ne pense qu'à lui"
5. "Le casque d'or de Mambrino"
6. "Chacun sa Dulcinea"
7. "Pourquoi fait-il toutes ces choses"
8. "La quête"
9. "Sans amour"
10. "Gloria"
11. "Aldonza"
12. "Le chevalier aux miroir"
13. "La mort/Dulcinea (reprise)"/ "La Quête (reprise)"/"L'Homme de la Mancha (reprise)"/"De Profundis (reprise)"/"Le Final (reprise)".

CD 14 Ne me quitte pas (1972)

1. "Ne me quitte pas"
2. "Marieke"
3. "On n'oublie rien"
4. "Les Flamandes"
5. "Les prénoms de Paris"
6. "Quand on a que l'amour"
7. "Les biches"
8. "Le prochain amour"
9. "Le moribond"
10. "La valse à mille temps"
11. "Je ne sais pas"

CD 15 Les Marquises (1977)

1. "Jaurès"
2. "La ville s'endormait"
3. "Vieillir"
4. "Le bon Dieu"
5. "Les F…"
6. "Orly"
7. "Les remparts de Varsovie"
8. "Voir un ami pleurer"
9. "Knokke-le-Zoute Tango"
10. "Jojo"
11. "Le lion"
12. "Les Marquises"
13. "Sans exigences"
14. "Avec élégance"
15. "Mai 40"
16. "L'amour est mort"
17. "La cathédrale"

CD Bonus Chansons ou versions inédites de jeunesse (1953)

1. "À deux"
2. "Dites, si c'était vrai (poème)"
3. "Les gens"
4. "La haine"
5. "Départs"
6. "Le diable"
7. "Qu'avons-nous fait, bonnes gens"
8. "L'ange déchu"
9. "Les pieds dans le ruisseau"
10. "La Bastille"
11. "Ce qu'il nous faut"
12. "L'accordéon de la vie"
13. "Je suis l'ombre des chansons"
14. "S'il te faut"
15. "Ballade"
16. "L'orage"
17. "Les pavés"
18. "Le fou du roi"
19. "La foire"
20. "Sur la place"
21. "Il peut pleuvoir"
22. "Les deux fauteuils"
23. "Les enfants du roi"
24. "Le troubadour"
25. "Il nous faut regarder"
26. "C'est comme ça"
27. "Si tu revenais"
28. "Le pendu"
- Coffret intégral 2003 "Boîte à bonbons" (Barclay 980 816-2)
- Coffret intégral 2003 "Boîte velours" (Barclay 981 4066)
