= Le Far West =

1973 film

- Film poster
- Directed by: Jacques Brel
- Written by: Paul Andréota; Jacques Brel
- Starring: Jacques Brel; Danièle Évenou; Gabriel Jabbour; Véronique Mucret
- Cinematography: Alain Levent
- Edited by: Jacqueline Thiédot
- Release date: 31 May 1973
- Running time: 88 minutes
- Countries: Belgium; France
- Language: French

Le Far West (transl. "The Far West") is a 1973 Belgian-French comedy film starring and directed by Jacques Brel. It was entered into the 1973 Cannes Film Festival, where it was nominated for the Palme d'Or. This was Brel's ninth feature film as an actor, and his second directorial effort. Brel was obsessed with "le Far West" (the Wild West). The film was released 15 May 1973.

== Plot ==
Jacques, a 40-year-old citizen of Brussels, meets the fakir, Abracadabra who, before dying, gives him a special power. Jacques then meets Gabriel, a generous man, who dresses up as Davy Crockett, and who follows Jacques without asking questions. The two companions and other new friends set out to conquer the wild west, their childhood - just as Voltaire sought Eldorado, and Saint-Exupéry the unknown planet. The wild west they seek cannot be found, because it is an imaginary place, a piece of happiness buried in our hearts.

== Cast ==
- Jacques Brel as Jacques
- Danièle Évenou as Danièle
- Gabriel Jabbour as Gabriel
- Véronique Mucret as Véro
