= J'arrive =

Studio album by Jacques Brel
- Released: 1968
- Recorded: 7–23 September 1968
- Genre: Chanson
- Length: 41 minutes
- Label: Barclay/Universal
- Producer: Francois Rauber

Jacques Brel chronology
Jacques Brel 67 (1967)	J'arrive (1968)	L'Homme de la Mancha (1968)

J'arrive (English: I'm arriving) is Jacques Brel's eleventh studio album. Originally released in 1968 by Barclay (80373), the album was reissued on 23 September 2003 as part of the 16-CD box set Boîte à bonbons by Barclay (980 816-3). The album has been praised for Brel's ability to transmit a wide-range of feelings onto the listener, including melancholy, nostalgia and optimism.

== Track listing ==
Track	Title	Loose translation	Composer	Recorded
1	"J'arrive"	I'm arriving	Jacques Brel, Gérard Jouannest	1968-09-14
2	"Vesoul"	Vesoul	Jacques Brel	1968-09-23
3	"L'Ostendaise"	The Ostend Girl	Jacques Brel, François Rauber	1968-09-23
4	"Je suis un soir d'été"	I Am a Summer Evening	Jacques Brel	1968-09-15
5	"Regarde bien petit"	Watch Well, Kid	Jacques Brel	1968-09-14
6	"Comment tuer l'amant de sa femme quand on a été élevé comme moi dans la tradition"	How to Kill One's Wife's Lover When One Was Raised Like Me in Tradition	Jacques Brel, Gérard Jouannest	1968-09-12
7	"L'Éclusier"	The Lock Keeper	Jacques Brel	1968-09-07
8	"Un enfant"	A Child	Jacques Brel, Gérard Jouannest	1968-09-14
9	"La Bière"	Beer	Jacques Brel	1968-09-14
10	"La Chanson de Van Horst"	The Song of Van Horst	Jacques Brel, Gérard Jouannest	1972
11	"L'Enfance"	Childhood	Jacques Brel, François Rauber	1973-05-24

- Tracks 1–9 constituted the original 1968 album.
- Tracks 10–11 were added to the album when it was reissued as part of the 16-CD box set Boîte à bonbons.

== Personnel ==
- Jacques Brel – composer, vocals
- François Rauber – orchestra conductor, musical director
- Marcel Azzola - accordion on "Vesoul" and "L'éclusier"
- Janine De Waleyne - backing vocals on "Je suis un soir d'été" (uncredited)
- Gerhardt Lehner – recording engineer & audio mixing (uncredited)
- Jean-Marie Guérin – mastering
- Jean-Pierre Leloir – photography
