= Franz (1971 film) =

- Theatrical release poster
- Directed by: Jacques Brel
- Written by: Paul Andréota; Jacques Brel
- Starring: Jacques Brel; Barbara; Danièle Évenou
- Release date: 1971
- Running time: 91 minutes
- Countries: Belgium; France
- Language: French

Franz is a 1971 Belgian-French film directed by Jacques Brel.

== Plot ==
The story takes place in a Belgian seaside town, at a boarding house for convalescing civil servants. The six male residents' lives change dramatically when two women arrive. Catherine is a lively, sexually liberated woman willing to kiss, dance, and sleep with the men. Léonie is reserved, formal, and conservative. Léonie finds herself attracted to Léon, a Belgian who was a mercenary in Katanga in 1964, was wounded and carries psychological scars from the war. The other men play practical jokes on Léon, some of them cruel. As Léon courts Léonie, his mother brings him emotional distress as do his memories of war. The unlikely pair struggle to get past these obstacles.

== Cast ==
- Jacques Brel – Léon
- Barbara – Léonie
- Danièle Évenou – Catherine
- Fernand Fabre – Antoine
- Louis Navarre – Armond
- Ceel – Pascal
- Serge Sauvion – Serge
- François Cadet – Jules
- Luc Poret – Henri
- Jacques Provins – Grosjean
- Catherine Bady – Madame Grosjean
