= Marieke (statue) =

Statue in Bruges, Belgium, designed by Jef Claerhout

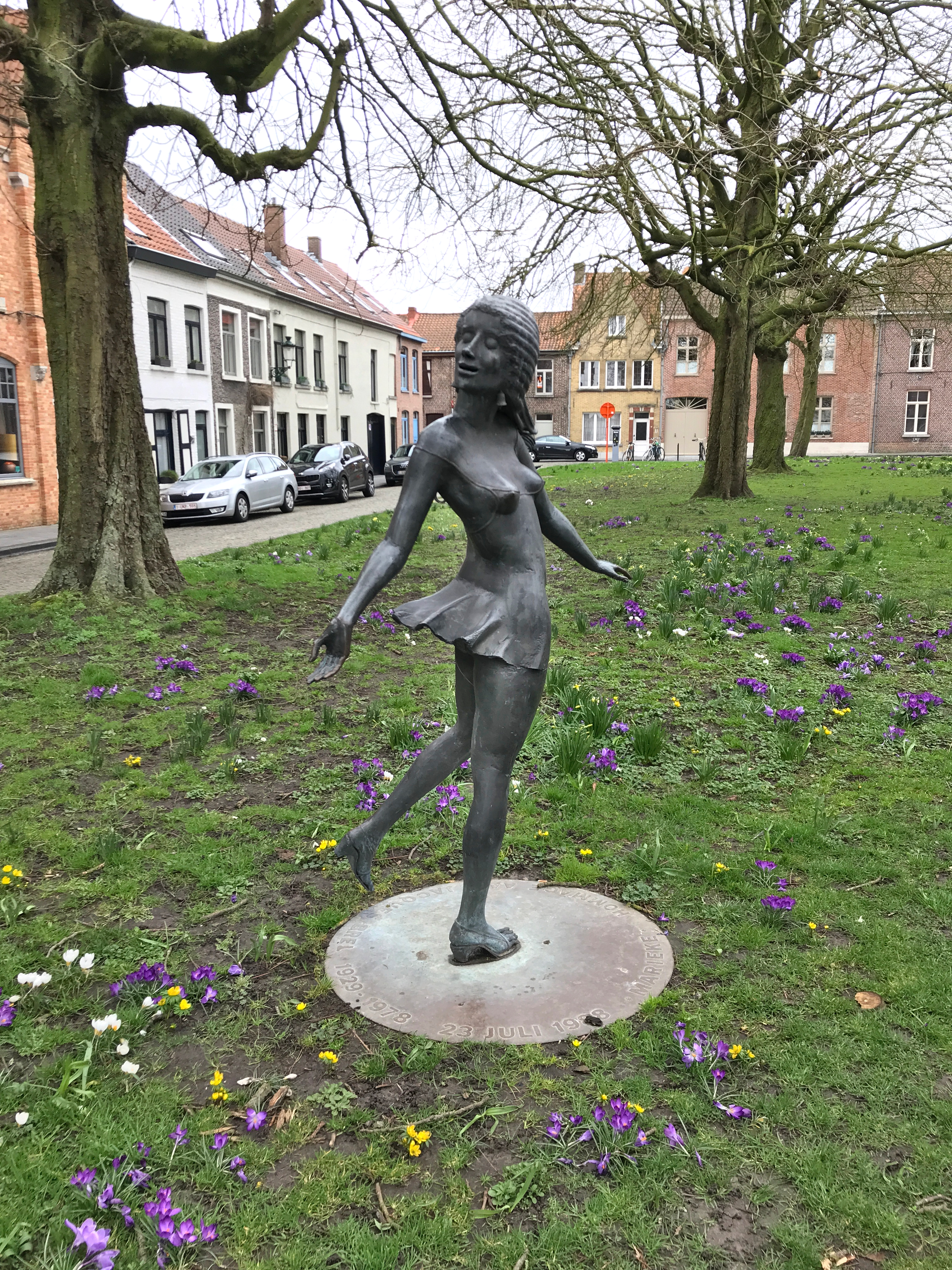
Marieke

Marieke is a 1988 statue in Bruges, Belgium, designed by Jef Claerhout. It is a homage to Jacques Brel's famous song Marieke.

== History ==
The statue was built at the request of journalist and Brel fan, Johan Anthierens. It was revealed on 23 July 1988 by mayor Frank Van Acker.

On 1 February 2012, the statue was clothed with knitted sleeves by anonymous pranksters.

== Statue ==
The statue is located at the Coupure (Bruges) in Bruges. It depicts a young woman, Marieke, who lived "between the towers of Bruges and Ghent" according to Brel's song of the same name.
