= Les Bourgeois =

Studio album by Jacques Brel
- Released: April 1962
- Recorded: 6–14 March 1962
- Genre: Chanson
- Length: 46 minutes
- Label: Barclay/Universal

Jacques Brel chronology
Marieke (1961)	Les Bourgeois (1962)	Les Bigotes (1963)

Les Bourgeois (English: The middle class) is the sixth studio album by Jacques Brel. Also known as Jacques Brel, the album was released on Barclay Records on 15 March 1962. Later, on 4 April 1962, a 10" maxi-single containing eight of the album's tracks was released. The same year saw the release of a limited, special edition release of the album that consisted of the original LP with "Jacques Brel" written diagonally across its white cover. This edition was numbered on the front and hand signed on the back.

It was reissued on 23 September 2003 under the title Les Bourgeois as part of the 16-CD box set Boîte à bonbons by Barclay (980 816-9).

== Track listing ==
Track	Title	Translation	Composer	Recorded
1	"Les Bourgeois"	The middle class	Jacques Brel, Jean Corti	1962-03-09
2	"Les Paumés du petit matin"	The lost ones of the morning	Jacques Brel, François Rauber	1962-03-09
3	"Le Plat Pays"	The flat country/The Lowlands	Jacques Brel	1962-03-06
4	"Zangra"	Zangra	Jacques Brel	1962-03-06
5	"Une île"	An island	Jacques Brel	1962-03-14
6	"Madeleine"	Madeleine	Jacques Brel, Jean Corti, Gérard Jouannest	1962-03-09
7	"Bruxelles"	Brussels	Jacques Brel, Gérard Jouannest	1962-03-14
8	"Chanson sans paroles"	Song without words	Jacques Brel, François Rauber	1962-03-14
9	"Les Biches"	The does	Jacques Brel, Gérard Jouannest	1962-03-07
10	"Le Caporal Casse-Pompon"	Corporal Casse-Pompon	Jacques Brel	1962-03-06
11	"La Statue"	The statue	Jacques Brel, François Rauber	1962-03-07
12	"Rosa"	Rosa	Jacques Brel	1962-03-07
13	"Il neige sur Liège"	It snows on Liège	Jacques Brel	1963-05-30
14	"Pourquoi faut-il que les hommes s'ennuient"	Why are the men bored	Jacques Brel	1963

- Recorded at Studio Barclay-Hoche in Paris.
- Tracks 1–12 constituted the original 1962 album.
- Tracks 13–14 were added to the album when it was reissued as part of the 16-CD box set Boîte à bonbons.

== Personnel ==
- Jacques Brel – composer, vocals
- François Rauber – orchestra conductor
- Jean Corti - bandoneon on "Rosa"
- Gerhardt Lehner – recording engineer & audio mixing (uncredited)
- Jean-Marie Guérin – mastering
- Herman Leonard – photography
- Jean-Pierre Leloir – photography
