= Ne me quitte pas (album) =

Studio album by Jacques Brel
- Released: 6 September 1972
- Recorded: 12–27 June 1972
- Genre: Chanson
- Length: 38 minutes
- Label: Barclay/Universal

Jacques Brel chronology
L'Homme de la Mancha (1968)	Ne me quitte pas (1972)	Les Marquises (1977)

Professional ratings
Review scores
Source	Rating
Allmusic	link

Ne me quitte pas (English: Don't leave me) is Jacques Brel's thirteenth studio album. Released in 1972 by Barclay (80145), the album features re-recordings of many of Brel's best-known songs. The album was reissued on 23 September 2003 as part of the 16-CD box set Boîte à bonbons (Barclay: 980 817-6).

== Title song ==
The title song has been translated into numerous languages, and has been widely covered by French and English-speaking artists, including Isabelle Aubret (2001), Shirley Bassey (1972), Sam Cooke (1960), Céline Dion (1994), Olivia Newton-John (1972), Nina Simone (1965), Dionne Warwick (1972) and Belinda Carlisle (2007).

== Track listing ==
Track	Title	Translation	Composer	Recorded
1	"Ne me quitte pas"	Don't leave me	Jacques Brel	1972-06-20
2	"Marieke"	Marieke	Jacques Brel, Gérard Jouannest	1972-06-12
3	"On n'oublie rien"	One forgets nothing	Jacques Brel, Gérard Jouannest	1972-06-12
4	"Les Flamandes"	The Flemish	Jacques Brel	1972-06-12
5	"Les Prénoms de Paris"	The names of Paris	Jacques Brel, Gérard Jouannest	1972-06-12
6	"Quand on n'a que l'amour"	When you only have love	Jacques Brel	1972-06-27
7	"Les Biches"	The does	Jacques Brel, Gérard Jouannest	1972-06-23
8	"Le Prochain Amour"	The next love	Jacques Brel, Gérard Jouannest	1972-06-23
9	"Le Moribond"	The dying man	Jacques Brel	1972-06-20
10	"La Valse à mille temps"	The waltz a thousand times as fast	Jacques Brel	1972-06-27
11	"Je ne sais pas"	I don't know	Jacques Brel	1972-06-12

== Personnel ==
- Jacques Brel – composer, vocals
- François Rauber – orchestra conductor, arrangements
- Gérard Jouannest – piano
- Gilbert Roussel, Marcel Azzola - accordion on "La valse a mille temps" (uncredited)
- Claude Achallé – audio engineer
- Jean-Marie Guérin – mastering
- Alain Marouani – photography
