= Vesoul (song) =

1968 song by Jacques Brel

- French 7" single cover

Song by Jacques Brel
- Published: 1968
- Released: 1968
- Length: 3:06
- Label: Barclay
- Songwriter: Jacques Brel

"Vesoul" is a 1968 French song by Belgian singer-songwriter Jacques Brel. It has been covered in the original French by many French and international artists. Named after the French town Vesoul (eastern part of France), the song remains one of Brel's most famous songs.

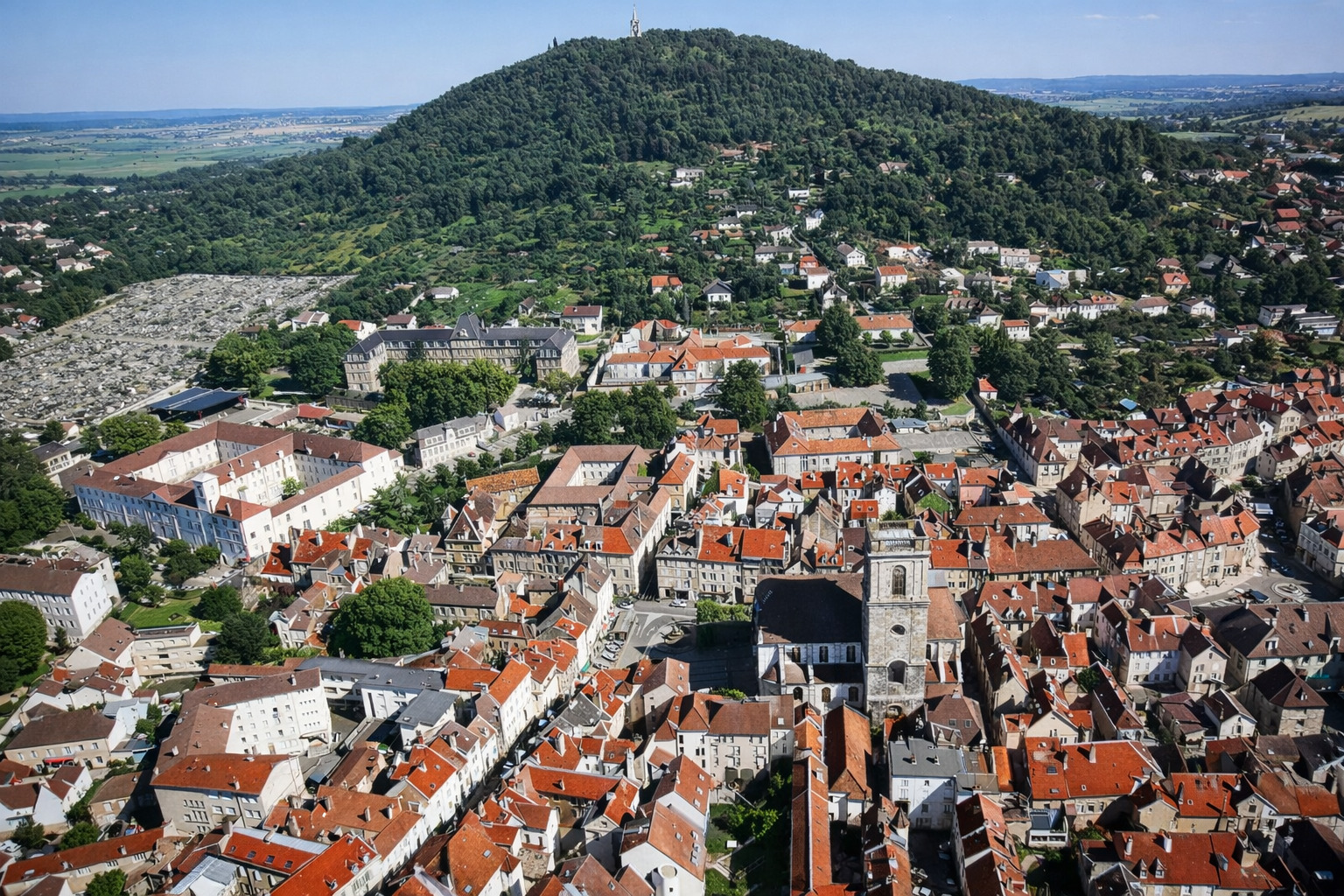
The town of Vesoul
