= L'Homme de la Mancha =

Studio album by Jacques Brel
- Released: 1968
- Recorded: 23–27 November 1968
- Genre: Chanson
- Length: 45 minutes
- Label: Barclay/Universal

Jacques Brel chronology
| J'arrive (1968) | L'Homme de la Mancha (1968) | Ne me quitte pas (1972) |

L'Homme de la Mancha (English: The man of la Mancha) is Jacques Brel's twelfth studio album. Released in 1968, it is the cast recording of the French adaptation of The Man of la Mancha by Mitch Leigh and Joe Darion. Brel adapted the book, translated the lyrics, directed the production, and played the role of Don Quixote. This was the only time he ever adapted songs by other writers or appeared in a stage musical. Joan Diener, who played Dulcinea in the original 1965 production, reprised the part in this production. The album was reissued on 23 September 2003 as part of the 16-CD box set Boîte à bonbons by Barclay (980 817-5).

== Track listing ==
| Track | Title | Translation | Vocals |
|---|---|---|---|
| 1 | "L'Homme de la Mancha" | The man of la Mancha | Jacques Brel, Jean-Claude Calon |
| 2 | "Un animal" | An animal | Joan Diener |
| 3 | "Dulcinéa" | Dulcinéa | Jacques Brel, The Muleteers |
| 4 | "Vraiment je ne pense qu'à lui" | I'm only thinking of him | Louis Navarre, Constance Arnaud, Marguerite Paquet |
| 5 | "Le Casque d'or de Mambrino" | The golden helmet of Mambrino | Jacques Brel, Jacques Provins, Jean-Claude Calon |
| 6 | "Chacun sa Dulcinéa" | To each his Dulcinéa | Louis Navarre |
| 7 | "Pourquoi fait-il toutes ces choses?" | Why does he do these things? | Joan Diener |
| 8 | "La Quête" | The quest | Jacques Brel |
| 9 | "Sans amour" | Without love | Gérald Clavel, The Muleteers |
| 10 | "Gloria" | Gloria | Armmand Mestral, Joan Diener, Jean-Claude Calon |
| 11 | "Aldonza" | Aldonza | Joan Diener, Jacques Brel |
| 12 | "Le Chevalier aux miroirs" | The knight of the mirrors | Jean Mauvais, Jacques Brel |
| 13a | "La Mort: Dulcinéa (reprise)" | Death: Dulcinéa (reprise) | Joan Diener |
| 13b | "La Quête (reprise)" | The quest (reprise) | Joan Diener, Jacques Brel |
| 13c | "L'Homme de la Mancha (reprise)" | The man of la Mancha (reprise) | Jacques Brel, Jean-Claude Calon, Joan Diener |
| 13d | "De Profundis (reprise)" | Profundis (reprise) | Louis Navarre |
| 13e | "Le Final (reprise)" | Finale (reprise) | Joan Diener, All the Prisoners |

== Personnel ==
- Jacques Brel – producer, translations, Don Quixote
- François Rauber – arrangements, orchestra conductor
- Mitch Leigh – composer
- Joe Darion – book and lyrics
- Joan Diener – Dulcinea
- Armand Mestral – The Innkeeper
- Constance Arnaud – The Housekeeper
- Marguerite Paquet – Antonia
- Jean-Claude Calon – Sancho Panza
- Louis Navarre – Padre
- Jacques Provin – Barber
- Manuela Miranda
- Janine Grenet
- Jean Mauvais
- Jean-Louis Tristan
- Suzanne Hennion
- Gérard Clavel
- Jean Salamero
- Michel Jarry
- Maxime Caza
- Luis Bernardo
- Luc Simon – set design
- Gerhard Lehner – audio engineer
- Jean-Marie Guérin – mastering
- Alain Marouani – photography
