= Jacques Brel 67 =

Album by Jacques Brel

Studio album by Jacques Brel
- Released: 1967
- Recorded: 30 December 1966 – 18 January 1967
- Genre: Chanson
- Length: 39 minutes
- Label: Barclay/Universal

Jacques Brel chronology
Ces gens-là (1966)	Jacques Brel 67 (1967)	J'arrive (1968)

Jacques Brel 67 is Jacques Brel's tenth studio album. Originally released in 1967 by Barclay (B 8024), the album was reissued on 23 September 2003 under the title Jacques Brel 67 as part of the 16-CD box set Boîte à bonbons by Barclay (980 817-3).

== Track listing ==
Track	Title	Translation	Composer	Recorded
1	"Mon enfance"	My childhood	Jacques Brel	1967-01-02
2	"Le Cheval"	The horse	Jacques Brel, Gérard Jouannest	1966-12-30
3	"Mon père disait"	My father said	Jacques Brel	1967-01-03
4	"La… la… la…"	La... la... la...	Jacques Brel	1966-12-30
5	"Les Cœurs tendres"	Tender hearts	Jacques Brel	1967-01-18
6	"Fils de…"	Sons of...	Jacques Brel, Gérard Jouannest	1967-01-02
7	"Les Bonbons 67"	The candies 67	Jacques Brel	1966-12-30
8	"La Chanson des vieux amants"	The song of old lovers	Jacques Brel, Gérard Jouannest	1967-01-03
9	"À jeun"	On an empty stomach	Jacques Brel, Gérard Jouannest	1967-01-02
10	"Le Gaz"	The gas	Jacques Brel, Gérard Jouannest	1966-12-30
11	"Les Moutons"	Sheep	Jacques Brel, Gérard Jouannest	1967-10-01

- Tracks 1–10 constituted the original 1967 album.
- Track 11 was added to the album when it was reissued as part of the 16-CD box set Boîte à bonbons.

== Personnel ==
- François Rauber – orchestra conductor, arranger
- Gerhardt Lehner – recording engineer & audio mixing (uncredited)
- Alain Marouani, Hubert Grooteclaes - photography
