= François Brune =

French author and professor

François Brune (born 30 September 1940), whose real name is Bruno Hongre, is a French author and professor. He contributed to the Monde Diplomatique where he wrote articles about advertisement.

He is a graduate of HEC Paris and an associate professor of literature.
