= Ces gens-là =

Studio album by Jacques Brel
- Released: 1966
- Recorded: 7 January 1964 – 6 November 1965
- Studio: Studios Barclay-Hoche Enregistrements, Paris
- Genre: Chanson
- Length: 49 minutes
- Label: Barclay/Universal

Jacques Brel chronology
Les Bonbons (1966)	Ces gens-là (1966)	Jacques Brel 67 (1967)

Ces gens-là (English: Those people) is the ninth studio album by Jacques Brel. Also known as Jef, it was released in 1966 by Barclay (80323). The album was reissued on 23 September 2003 under the title Ces Gens-Là as part of the 16-CD box set Boîte à bonbons by Barclay (980 817-2).

== Track listing ==
Track	Title	Translation	Songwriter(s)	Recorded
1	"Ces gens-là"	"Those People"	Jacques Brel	1965-11-06
2	"Jef"	"Jef"	Brel	1964-01-08
3	"La Chanson de Jacky"	"Jacky's Song"	Brel, Gérard Jouannest	1965-11-02
4	"Les Bergers"	"The Shepherds"	Brel	1964-01-07
5	"Le Tango funèbre"	"The Funeral Tango"	Brel, Jouannest	1964-03-07
6	"Fernand"	"Fernand"	Brel, Jouannest	1965-11-06
7	"Mathilde"	"Mathilde"	Brel, Jouannest	1964-01-09
8	"L'Âge idiot"	"The Idiotic Age"	Brel	1965-11-02
9	"Grand-mère"	"Grandmother"	Brel	1965-11-03
10	"Les Désespérés"	"The Desperate Ones"	Brel, Jouannest	1965-11-06
11	"Mijn vlakke land (Le Plat Pays)"	"The Flat Country"	Brel	1963-01-08
12	"Rosa (in Flemish)"	"Rosa"	Brel, Jouannest	1963-01-08
13	"De burgerij (Les bourgeois)"	"The bourgeois"	Brel, Jean Corti	1963-01-08
14	"De nuttelozen van de nacht (Les paumés du petit matin)"	"The Lost Ones of the Early Morning"	Brel, François Rauber	1963-01-08

- Tracks 1–10 constituted the original 1966 album.
- Tracks 11–14 were originally issued on EP Barclay 70907 EP 45, of which the orchestral sessions were recorded on 8 January 1963, with separate vocals by Brel added later. These tracks do not belong to the original album 'Ces Gens-là' but were added when it was reissued as part of the 16-CD box set Boîte à bonbons.

== Personnel ==
- Jacques Brel – composer, vocals
- François Rauber – orchestra conductor
- François Rauber et Son Orchestre - accompaniment
- Gérard Jouannest – piano
- Jean Corti - accordion
- Gerhardt Lehner – recording engineer & audio mixing (uncredited)
- Jean-Marie Guérin – mastering
- Hubert Grooteclaes – photography
