= Au printemps (album) =

Studio album by Jacques Brel
- Released: 1958
- Recorded: 12 March – 1 April 1958
- Genre: Chanson
- Length: 24:14 (LP); 34:09 (CD)
- Label: Philips (original album); Barclay/Universal

Jacques Brel chronology
Quand on n'a que l'amour (1957)	Au printemps (1958)	La Valse à mille temps (1959)

Au printemps (English: In the Spring) is the third studio album by Jacques Brel. Also known as Jacques Brel 3, the original record was released in 1958. The album was reissued on 23 September 2003 under the title Au printemps as part of the 16-CD box set Boîte à bonbons by Barclay (980 816-5).

== Track listing ==
Track	Title	Translation	Composer	Recorded
1	"Demain l'on se marie (La Chanson des fiancés)"	Tomorrow we'll marry (The song of the fiances)	Jacques Brel	1958-03-14
2	"Au printemps"	In the spring	Jacques Brel	1958-04-01
3	"Je ne sais pas"	I don't know	Jacques Brel	1958-04-01
4	"Le Colonel"	The colonel	Jacques Brel, Gaby Wagenheim	1958-04-01
5	"Dors ma mie, bonsoir"	Sleep my love, good night	Jacques Brel, François Rauber	1958-03-12
6	"La lumière jaillira"	The light will shine	Jacques Brel, François Rauber	1958-04-01
7	"Dites, si c'était vrai" (poème)	Say, if it were true (poem)	Jacques Brel	1958-04-01
8	"L'Homme dans la cité"	The man in the city	Jacques Brel, François Rauber	1958-04-01
9	"Litanies pour un retour"	Litanies for a return	Jacques Brel, François Rauber	1958-04-01
10	"Voici"	Here	Jacques Brel, François Rauber	1958-04-01
11	"Voir"	See	Jacques Brel	1958-10-07
12	"L'Aventure"	The adventure	Jacques Brel	1958-10-21
13	"Dites, si c'était vrai" (poème)	Say, if it were true (poem)	Jacques Brel	1956-09-19

- Tracks 1–10 constituted the original 1958 album.
- Tracks 11–13 were added to the album when it was reissued as part of the 16-CD box set Boîte à bonbons.

== Credits ==
- Jacques Brel – composer, vocals
- André Popp – orchestra conductor (tracks 1, 4, 7, 10, 13)
- François Rauber – orchestra conductor (tracks 2–3, 8–9, 11–12)
- Jean-Marie Guérin – mastering
- Henri Guilbaud – photography
