= Quand on n'a que l'amour =

Studio album by Jacques Brel
- Released: April 1957
- Recorded: 11 March 1955 – 22 March 1957
- Genre: Chanson
- Length: 25:48 (LP); 28:57 (CD)
- Labels: Philips (original album); Barclay/Universal

Jacques Brel chronology
Jacques Brel et ses chansons (1954)	Quand on n'a que l'amour (1957)	Au printemps (1958)

Singles from Quand on n'a que l'amour
- 1. "Les Pieds dans le ruisseau" Released: 1955; 2. "Qu'avons-nous fait bonnes gens? / Les Pieds dans le ruisseau" Released: 1956; 3. "Quand on n'a Que l'Amour / Les Blés / Saint-Pierre" Released: 1956; 4. "L'Air de la bêtise / Pardons / Heureux / La Bourrée du célibataire" Released: 1958

Quand on n'a que l'amour (English: When love is all you have) is the second studio album by Jacques Brel. Also known as Jacques Brel 2, the original album was released in April 1957 by Philips (N76.085R). The album was reissued on 23 September 2003 under the title Quand on n'a que l'amour as part of the 16-CD box set Boîte à bonbons by Barclay (980 816-4). The title song "Quand on n'a que l'amour" has been covered by Dalida, Céline Dion, Lara Fabian, Patricia Kaas, and Latifa, among others.

== Track listing ==
Track	Title	Translation	Composer	Recorded
1	"Quand on n'a que l'amour"	When we only have love	Jacques Brel	1956-09-18
2	"Qu'avons-nous fait, bonnes gens"	What have we done, good people	Jacques Brel	1955-03-11
3	"Les Pieds dans le ruisseau"	Standing in the stream	Jacques Brel	1955-03-17
4	"Pardons"	Pardons	Jacques Brel, Jacques Vigouroux	1957-03-22
5	"La Bourrée du célibataire"	The bachelor's dance	Jacques Brel	1957-03-22
6	"L'Air de la bêtise"	The Air of stupidity	Jacques Brel	1957-03-22
7	"Saint-Pierre"	Saint Peter	Jacques Brel	1956-09-19
8	"J'en appelle"	I appeal	Jacques Brel	1957-03-22
9	"Heureux"	Happy	Jacques Brel	1957-03-22
10	"Les Blés"	Wheat	Jacques Brel	1956-09-19
11	"Quand on n'a que l'amour"	When we only have love	Jacques Brel	1960-01-25

- Tracks 1–10 constituted the original 1957 album, recorded at the Théâtre de l'Apollo, Paris.
- Track 11 was added when it was reissued as part of the 16-CD box set Boîte à bonbons.

== Credits ==
- Jacques Brel – composer, vocals
- André Popp – orchestra conductor (tracks 1, 4–10)
- Michel Legrand – orchestra conductor (tracks 2–3)
- François Rauber – orchestra conductor (track 11)
- A. Vénéroni – artwork

=== Certifications ===
Region	Certification	Certified units/sales
Belgium (BRMA)	Gold	25,000^{*}
^{*} Sales figures based on certification alone.
