= Jacques Brel et ses chansons =

Studio album by Jacques Brel
- Released: March 1954
- Recorded: 15 February 1954 (original album)
- Genre: Chanson
- Length: 19:29 (LP); 37:12 (CD)
- Label: Philips

Jacques Brel chronology
Jacques Brel et ses chansons (1954)	Quand on n'a que l'amour (1957)

Jacques Brel et ses chansons transl. Jacques Brel and his songs, later released as Grand Jacques, is the début album by Belgian singer-songwriter Jacques Brel.

== History ==
The original album was released in March 1954 as a nine-song 10-inch LP by Philips Records (N 76.027 R). The original nine tracks were recorded on 15 February 1954 at Théâtre de l'Apollo in Paris. A later reissue of the album under the title Jacques Brel 1 was released by Barclay and included additional tracks from 1953, 1955, 1956, and 1961. The album was reissued on 23 September 2003 under the title Grand Jacques as part of the 16-CD box set Boîte à bonbons by Barclay (980 816-3).

== Critical reception ==
In her review for AllMusic, Amy Hanson called the album a "marvelous disc" and a "masterful collection of songs recorded ... at the beginning of Brel's storied career, and a glimpse into a style of chanson that he seldom returned to once he'd swept France, Europe, and then the States with his best-known classics just a couple years later". Hanson continued:

While Brel already has a strong sense of his lyric and arrangement, this kind of writing only comes once in a great while. But what is perhaps most interesting about Grand Jacques is how spare and minimal it is. These songs date to the years before Brel began working with longtime arrangers Gérard Jouannest and François Rauber, and therefore, the ... songs lack the sweeping orchestration that would punctuate the singer's later work. And that is the utter joy of this set. From the title track and the stunningly sparse "Il Pleut Les Carreaux" and on to the utterly provincial "C'est Comme Ca," this is unmistakably Brel.

== Track listing ==
All tracks are written by Jacques Brel, except where noted

Standard edition
No.	Title	Writer(s)	Recorded	Length
1.	"La Haine" (Hate)		1954-02-15	1:53
2.	"Grand Jacques (C'est trop facile)" (Great Jacques (It's too easy))		1954-02-15	1:47
3.	"Il pleut (Les Carreaux)" (It's raining (The windowpanes))		1954-02-15	2:33
4.	"Le Diable (Ça va)" (The devil (All's well))		1954-02-15	2:24
5.	"Il peut pleuvoir" (Let it rain)	Jacques Brel, Glen Powell	1954-02-15	1:42
6.	"Il nous faut regarder" (We need to look)		1954-02-15	2:21
7.	"Le Fou du roi" (The jester)		1954-02-15	1:55
8.	"C'est comme ça" (That's the way it is)		1954-02-15	2:06
9.	"Sur la place" (In the square)		1954-02-15	2:48

All tracks are written by Jacques Brel

Bonus tracks in CD release
No.	Title	Recorded	Length
10.	"S'il te faut" (If you have to)	1955-03-11	2:04
11.	"La Bastille" (The Bastille)	1955-10-25	2:56
12.	"Prière païenne" (Pagan prayer)	1956-09-18	2:33
13.	"Il y a" (There is)	1953-02-17	2:19
14.	"La Foire" (The fair)	1953-02-17	3:21
15.	"Sur la place" (In the square)	1961-11-10	3:36

- Tracks 1–9 constituted the original 1954 album.
- Tracks 10–15 were added to the album when it was reissued as part of the 16-CD box set Boîte à bonbons.
- The French 1988 edition Intégrale Grand Jacques (by Barclay Records, ASIN B000006UMW) has 23 tracks.

== Personnel ==
- Jacques Brel – vocals, acoustic guitar
- André Grassi – arrangements (tracks 1–9)
- Glen Powell – arrangements (tracks 13–14)
- Michel Legrand – orchestra conductor (track 10)
- André Popp – orchestra conductor (tracks 11–12)
- François Rauber – orchestra conductor (track 15)
- Jean-Marie Guérin – mastering
- Henri Guilbaud – photography
