= Ces gens-là (song) =

1962 song by Jacques Brel

- 7" vinyl single cover

Song by Jacques Brel

from the album Ces gens-là
- Released: 1965
- Recorded: November 6, 1965
- Genre: Chanson
- Length: 4:38
- Label: Barclay
- Songwriter(s): Jacques Brel

"Ces gens-là" is a French language song by the late Belgian singer Jacques Brel, published in 1966 by the Éditions Pouchenel of Brussels, about the despair of a hopeless love. The title, meaning "those people", or, "those folks", has also been translated as "that lot there".

In it the narrator is talking to a third party (a certain "Monsieur" (Sir, or Mister)), where he describes the different members of a given family in a very harsh manner, as in gossip; a family whose existence is particularly mediocre and desperate. He criticizes in particular their immobility.

The list ends with the daughter, the beautiful Frida whom he loves passionately, and whose love is reciprocal, but whose family does not allow the marriage, believing that the suitor is not worthy, which perhaps explains why he hates them so much. In addition: "But let me tell you, Mister, that in that family, you don't leave, Mister, you don't leave."

The subjectivity of the narrator, which could taint his judgement, has also been confirmed by Brel, who called it "faux témoin" (false witness) in an interview with Dominique Arban, without rejecting the truth of his criticism of the petite bourgeoisie. On the other hand, although he denounces this environment throughout the song, the narrator concludes, taking leave of the caller and telling him that he must get on his way home, which can be interpreted as an admission of the fact he himself belongs to the middle class, or at least is close to.

The first part of the song is a slow 3/4 time signature of a repetitive theme, of a somber mood, where, from the perspective of voice, tension grows moderately but steadily, and eventually explodes when the narrator evokes Frida, reflecting his passion for her; the music then returns to its first depressed theme for the end of the song.

The song has since been covered by French popular music bands such as Ange, Oxmo Puccino and Noir Désir, although Ange may have missed the point of the song by excluding the part about Frida; on the Le Cimetière des arlequins album cover, is mentioned: "To Jacques Brel, we didn't dare take Frida from you".
