= Jean Corti =

Jean Corti (1929 – 25 November 2015) was an Italian-French accordionist and composer. He was the accompanist of Jacques Brel for six years, from 1960 to 1966.

== Career ==
Corti composed several songs, either alone (Les Bourgeois), with Brel and Gérard Jouannest (Les Vieux, Madeleine, The Toros), or with Gerard Jouannest (Titine). He regularly collaborated with the group Têtes Raides during the mid-1990s, and group members persuaded him to release his own albums, such as Fiorina. In 2000, he played the song Né Dans les Rues with the French reggae singer Pierpoljak.

== Discography ==
=== Albums with Jacques Brel ===
- Marieke (1961)
- Olympia 1961 (1962)
- Les Bourgeois (1962)
- Olympia 1964 (1964)
- Les Bonbons (1966)
- Ces gens-là (1966)

=== Solo songs ===
- Couka (2001)
- Versatile (with Loïc Lantoine) (2007)
- Fiorina (with Allain Leprest, Thomas Fersen, and others) (2009)
