= Madeleine (song) =

1962 song by Jacques Brel

- 7" vinyl single cover

Song by Jacques Brel

from the album Olympia 1961 and Les Bourgeois
- Released: 1962
- Genre: Chanson Française
- Length: 2:46 (Olympia 1961 version); 2:38 (studio version)
- Label: Philips Records (Olympia 1961 version): Barclay Records (studio version)
- Composers: Gérard Jouannest, Jean Corti
- Lyricist: Jacques Brel

Madeleine is a song by singer-songwriter Jacques Brel. Brel co-composed the song with musicians Gérard Jouannest and Jean Corti. The song was created in 1961, at The Olympia. The song was first recorded on the 1962 live album Olympia 1961, the last album Brel recorded with the Philips Records. When Brel moved to Barclay Records he released a studio version of the song in 1962 on the album Les Bourgeois, and as a Super 45 rpm (The live version with Philips was also released on a 45 rpm). It became a classic, and Brel closed his tours at the Olympia with Madeleine in 1964 and 1966.

== History ==
Marie-Madeleine Lison, a florist in Brussels of whom Brel was a client, was convinced she was the inspiration for the song. She was a model when she was younger, and was photographed by celebrity photographer Verhassel made a series of portraits of her, one of which featured her surrounded by lilacs. Brel would have been inspired by this photo, as it hung in her florist shop.

A more likely theory is that the song is based on a good friend of Brel's, who he was introduced to through Georges Brassens. Madeleine Zeffa Biver was the daughter of a communist father and a Jewish mother She "escaped the Nazis in 44 then an abusive husband a few years later. When she was twenty, she often visited the poets, musicians, and artists of Saint-Germain-des-Prés while she worked as a model for hairdressers in Paris. She once stood up Brel on a date, hence the subject matter of the song: "Ce soir, j'attends Madeleine; j'ai apporté des lilas; j'en apporte toutes les semaines…" ("Tonight, I'm waiting for Madeleine, I brought lilacs, I bring them every week...")

== Recordings ==
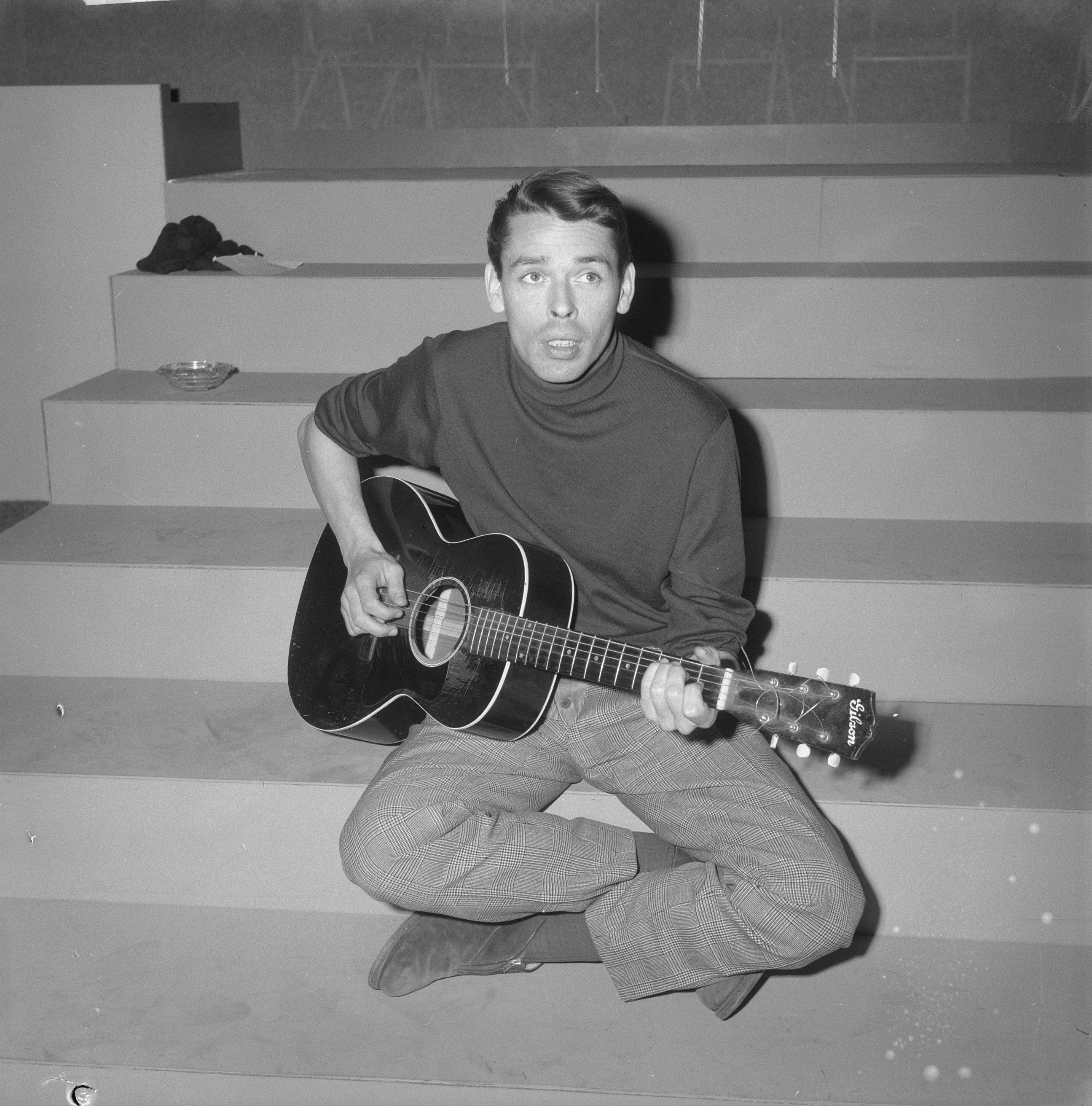
Brel in a 1962 TV show

1962:

- 33 rpm 30 cm Philips B 77 386 L Olympia 1961
- Super 45 rpm Philips 432.766 BE: Les Bourgeois, Les Singes, Les paumés du petit matin, Madeleine (live version)
- 33 rpm 30 cm Barclay 80 173 Les Bourgeois (without a title in the original, the album was released with two different sleeves
- 33 rpm 25 cm Barclay 80 175 : Madeleine (originally appeared untitled)
- Super 45 rpm Barclay 70 452 M : Madeleine, Zangra, Les paumés du petit matin, Rosa (Released in two different sleeves)
- 33 rpm 25 cm Philips B 76 556 R Les paumés du petit matin (Brel was already signed with Barclay when this was released. This disc includes six songs recorded at the Olympia, as well as two unreleased studio recordings: L'aventure and Voir.)

1964:

- Olympia 1964 (Also in Olympia 1964-1966)

1966:

- Reissue of the 30 cm album Les Bourgeois with a new title Le Plat pays (33 rpm Barclay 90 015)
- 33pm 30 cm Barclay BB 97 M Jacques Brel chante en multiphonie

1973:

- 45 rpm Barclay 61.837 " Madeleine, Rosa

In 2003, Madeleine appeared in the compilation album Infiniment

== Covers ==
The song has been covered by Quebecois singer Michel Rivard on the album Maudit bonheur in 1998, and by Pierre Bachelet in 2003 on the album Tu ne nous quittes pas

An English translation by Eric Blau and Mort Shuman was included in the revue, Jacques Brel is Alive and Well and Living in Paris, and on the album released in 1968.
