= Boulevard des Capucines =

Boulevard in Paris, France

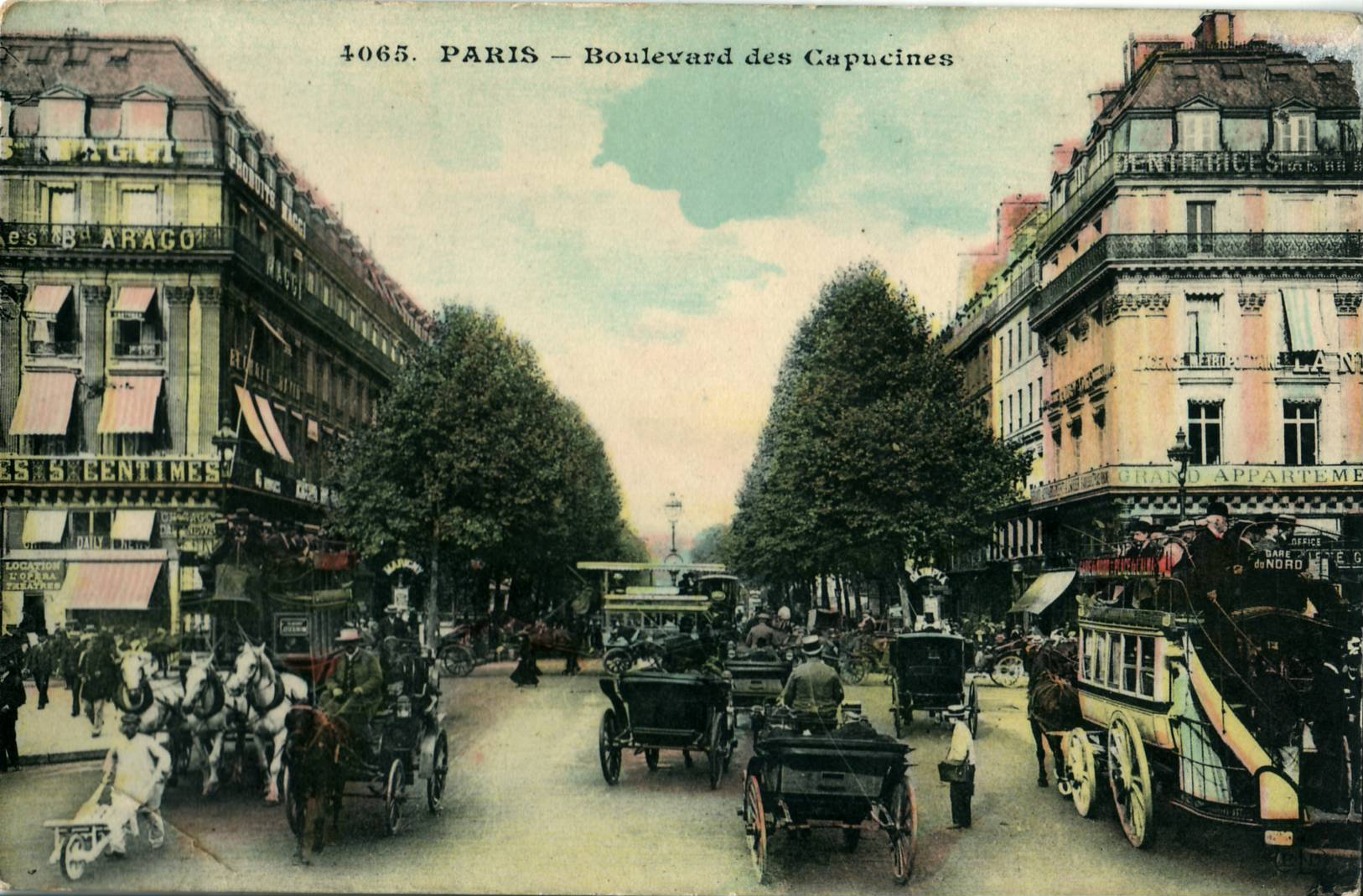
- Boulevard des Capucines at the start of the 20th century

- Location within Paris
- Namesake: Couvent des Capucines
- Length: 440 m (1,440 ft)
- Width: 35.40 m (116.1 ft)
- Arrondissement: 2nd, 9th
- Quarter: Madeleine . Chaussée-d'Antin
- Coordinates: 48°52′16″N 2°20′01″E
- From: rue Louis-le-Grand, rue de la Chaussée-d'Antin
- To: rue des Capucines, rue de Caumartin

Construction
- Completion: since 1685

Located near the Metro stations: Opéra and Madeleine.

The Boulevard des Capucines (French pronunciation: [bulvaʁ de kapysin]) is a boulevard in Paris. It is one of the 'Grands Boulevards' in Paris, a chain of boulevards built through the former course of the Wall of Charles V and the Louis XIII Wall, which were destroyed on the orders of Louis XIV.

The name comes from a beautiful convent of Capuchin nuns whose garden was on the south side of the boulevard prior to the French Revolution.

The former name, Rue Basse-du-Rempart ("bottom-of-the-wall street" in French), suggests that, in the beginning, the street paralleled the city wall of Paris. Then, when the wall was destroyed, the street was widened and became a boulevard.

== Notable places ==
At No. 1 stood the Neapolitan Café, famous for the writers, journalists, and actors who were its patrons, such as Catulle Mendès, Jean Moréas, Armand Silvestre, and Laurent Tailhade.

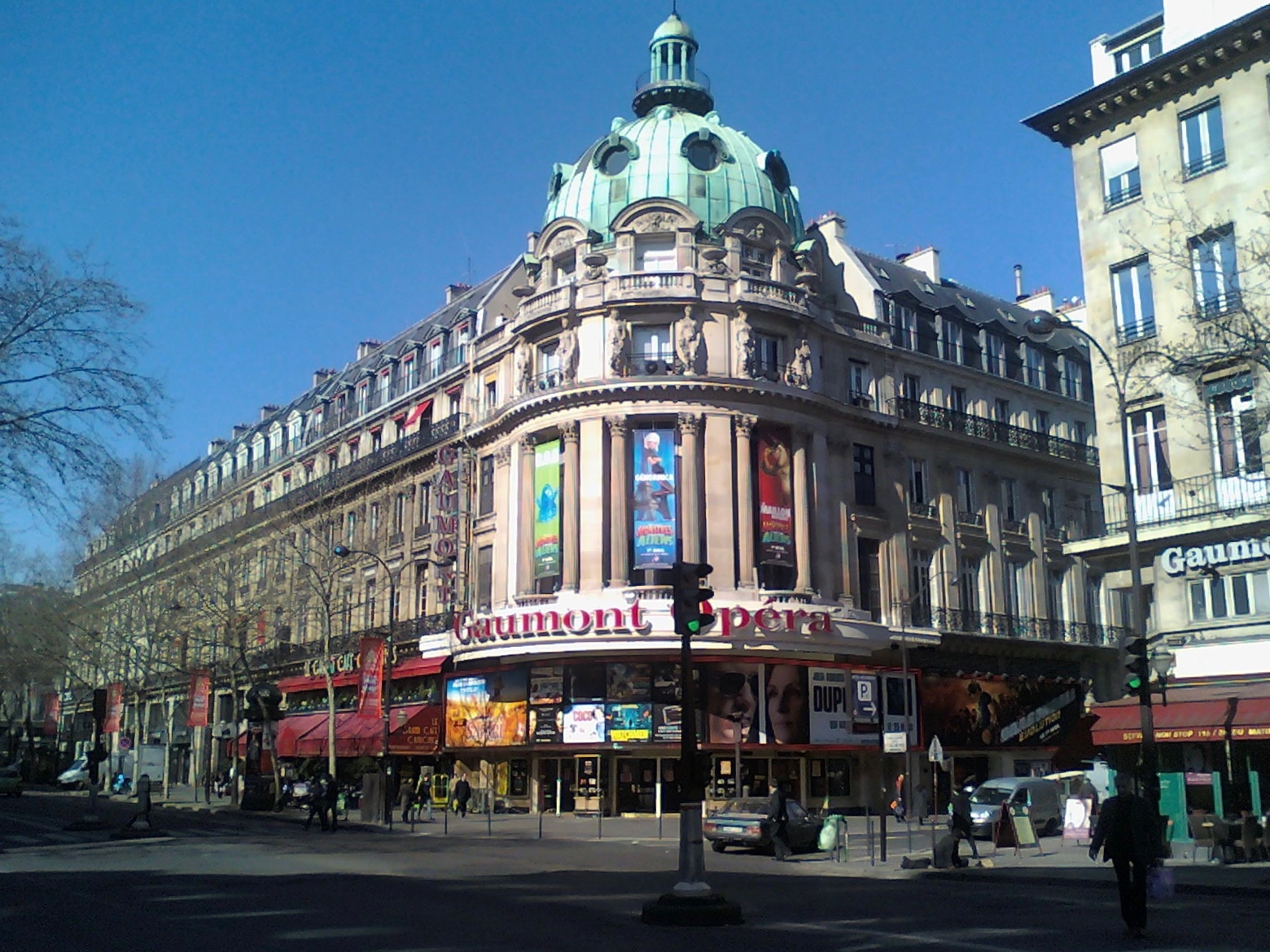
Gaumont Opéra

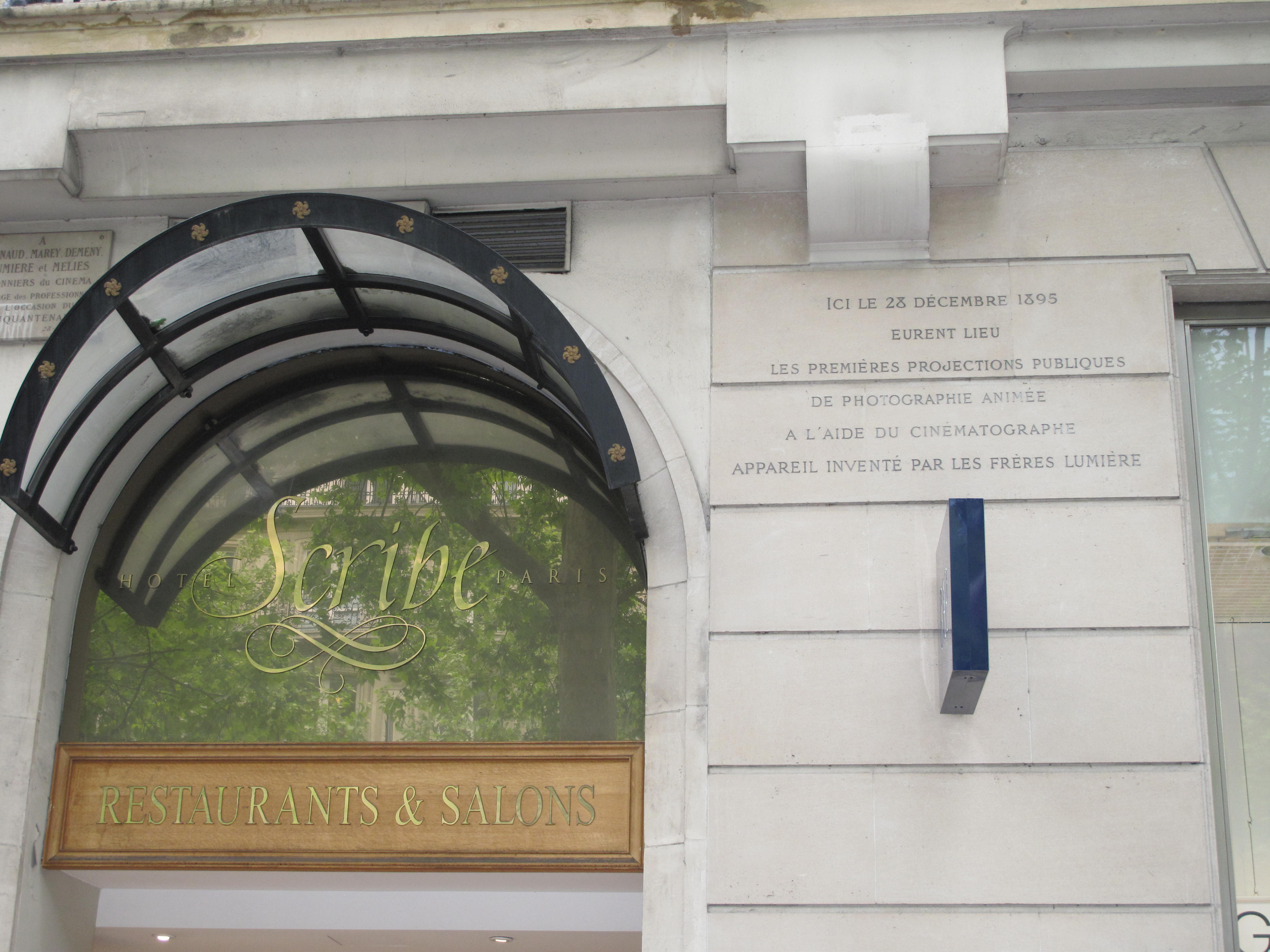
Very first movies

No. 2, at the junction with the rue de la Chaussée-d'Antin, was the site of the former Hotel de Montmorency, then Théâtre du Vaudeville 1869, later Paramount Opéra movies in 1927 and Gaumont Opéra since 2007. The main hall was the 'grand salon' of the hotel in the 18th century. The rotunda on the facade has been kept.

No. 5 was the location of the photographic studio of Pierre-Louis Pierson (later associated with the Mayer brothers), who was the photographic collaborator of Virginia Oldoini, Countess di Castiglione.

At No. 7, the Georama was erected in 1825: it was possible to see "the whole earth" inside a sphere 14 meters in diameter.

At No. 8, Jacques Offenbach lived from 1876 and died in 1880.

At No. 12, the Grand Hotel was built on a former swamp-garden.

No. 14 was the site of the Hotel Scribe and the location of the former Grand Café where the first public showing of movies by Auguste and Louis Lumière took place in the Salon Indien on 28 December 1895. Here, too, X-ray light experiments were carried out by Dr. Wilhelm Röntgen.

From No. 16 to No. 22 stood the buildings of the former newspaper L'Évènement, founded by Victor Hugo.

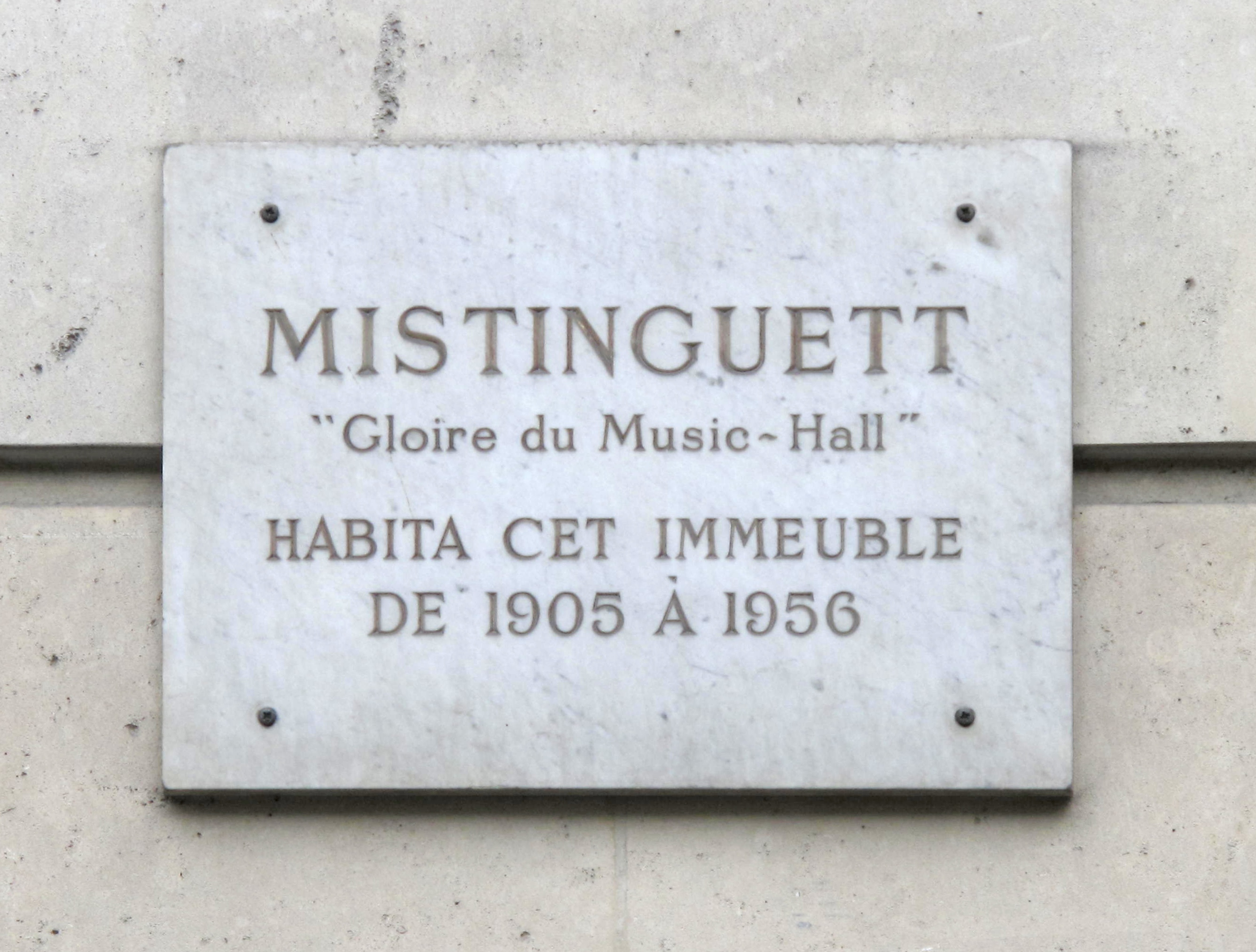
Mistinguett

At No. 24, Mistinguett lived from 1905 to 1956.

No. 25 was the former location of the Musée Cognacq-Jay set up in 1931.

At No. 27 stood the former store, the Samaritaine de Luxe, built by Frantz Jourdain, a specialist in Art Nouveau.

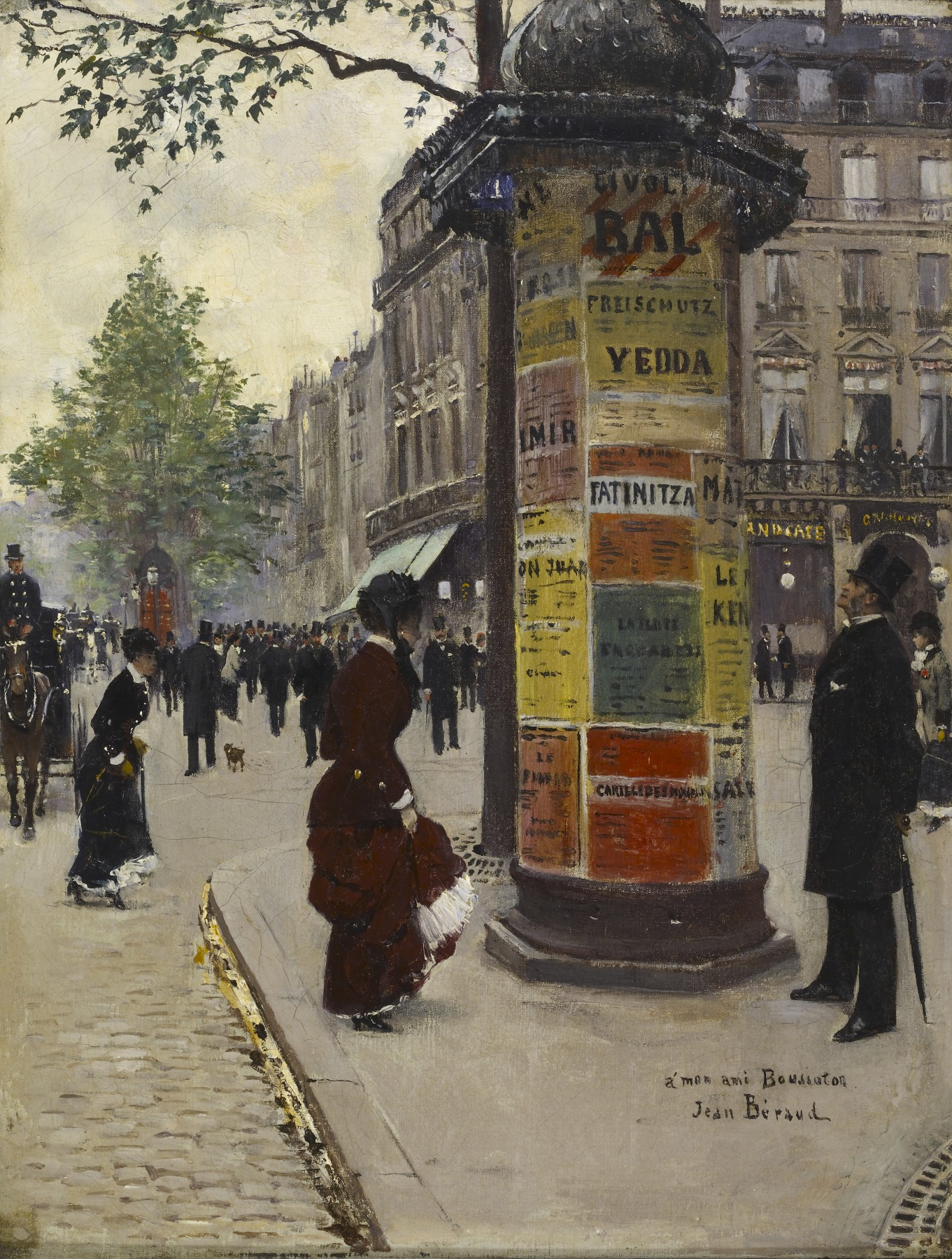
Paris Kiosk (Boulevard des Capucines). The Walters Art Museum.

No. 28 was the location of a roller coaster called montagnes russes (Russian mountains) in 1889. It was replaced in 1893 by the Olympia theater, a famous music hall founded in 1888 by Joseph Oller and taken over in 1952 by Bruno Coquatrix.

No. 35 was where Nadar had his photography studio, and was previously the studio of Gustave Le Gray, the central figure in French photography of the 1850s — an artist, teacher, and the author of several widely distributed instructional manuals on photography. And it here that at Nadar's invitation, the First Impressionist Exhibition was held on 15 April 1874, exhibitors included Renoir, Édouard Manet, Pissarro, and Claude Monet. The painting by Claude Monet, Impression, Sunrise, gave the exhibitors the name of Impressionists. Another of Claude Monet's paintings painted from a window in Nadar's studio is entitled Boulevard des Capucines, and is now visible in the Pushkin Museum in Moscow or the Nelson-Atkins Museum of Art in Kansas City, Missouri.

From No. 37 to No. 43 was the former location of the Ministry of Foreign Affairs from 1820 to 1853. On 23 February 1848, a battalion of the 14th regiment blocked the boulevard to protect François Guizot. In the evening, a crowd of demonstrators tried to break down the barricade. The soldiers fired, killing 35 people and wounding 50. The demonstrators put the corpses in a dumper and called the people of Paris to arms. It was the beginning of the revolution which ended the reign of Louis-Philippe the next day.
