= Paulette Coquatrix =

French costume designer

- Born: Clara Paulette Possicelsky; 26 April 1916; Paris, France
- Died: 28 May 2018 (aged 102); Paris, France
- Resting place: Cimetière du Père Lachaise
- Occupation: Costume designer
- Spouse(s): Bruno Coquatrix (m. 19??-1979; his death); 1 child

Paulette Coquatrix (born Clara Paulette Possicelsky, 26 April 1916 – 28 May 2018) was a French costume designer.

== Biography ==
At the beginning of the 1950s, she was a costume designer for the Comédie-Caumartin shows, directed by Bruno Coquatrix from 1952.

In the early 1960s, her costume atelier went bankrupt and closed down after Josephine Baker failed to pay for the costumes she had ordered for her revue of Paris, mes amours.

When her husband Bruno Coquatrix died in 1979, she inherited Olympia Hall in equal shares with her daughter Patricia. She entrusted the general direction to her nephew Jean-Michel Boris, who joined the company in 1954.

Under her ownership, the Olympia Hall was destructed and rebuilt identically a few meters away from its original location in 1997. After Jean-Michel Boris was laid off from the Olympia by her daughter Patricia, tensions arose between Paulette and Patricia regarding the business management of the music hall. Coquatrix sold the auditorium to the Vivendi group in August 2001.

Paulette Coquatrix died on 28 May 2018 at the age of 102.

== Publications ==
- (in French) Les coulisses de ma mémoire. Grasset & Fasquelle. 1984. ISBN 2-246-31071-7
- (in French) Mes noces d'or avec l'Olympia. Cator Astral. 17 November 2003. ISBN 978-2859204624

== Awards ==
- 1997: Chevalier of the Légion d'honneur

== Personal life ==
Clara Paulette Possicelsky married Bruno Coquatrix and she had three daughters. Her daughter Patricia was the artistic director of the Olympia until January 2002. In November 2010, she inaugurated the newly named street "rue Bruno Coquatrix" in Paris.

== See also ==
- Bruno Coquatrix
- Olympia Hall
