= Il pleut sur Bruxelles =

1981 single by Dalida

- 1981 French 7" vinyl single cover

Single by Dalida

from the album Olympia 81
- Language: French
- B-side: "Et la vie continuera"
- Released: 1981
- Length: 3:09
- Label: Orlando International Shows
- Songwriters: Jeff Barnel, Michel Jouveaux

Dalida singles chronology
"Fini, la comédie" (1981)	"Il pleut sur Bruxelles" (1981)	"Quand Je N'aime Plus, Je M'en Vais" (1981)

"Il pleut sur Bruxelles" (It rains on Brussels) is a 1981 song by Dalida in memory of Belgian singer Jacques Brel, who died three years earlier. The song was featured on her album Olympia 81 and also released as a single, with "Et la vie continuera" as B-side. The song was written by Jeff Barnel and Michel Jouveaux.

== Lyrics ==
The lyrics make reference to various characters and locations from Brel's songs, particularly "Jef", "Mathilde", "Ces Gens-Là", "Amsterdam", "Marieke", "Les Flamandes", "Vésoul", "Titine", "Madeleine", "J'Arrive", "Jojo", "La Fanette", "Fernand" and "Jacky". The song title refers to Brel's song "Bruxelles", but could also be a nod to "Il neige sur Liège" (It snows on Liège).
