= Claude May =

French actress (1913–2009)

- Born: 18 July 1913; Raincy, France
- Died: 3 July 2009 (aged 95); Saint-Jeannet, Alpes-Maritimes, France
- Occupation: Actress
- Years active: 1932-1956 (film)

Claude May (1913–2009) was a French film actress.

== Filmography ==
Year	Title	Role	Notes
1933	Simone Is Like That		
1933	Plein aux as		
1933	Quelqu'un a tué...		
1934	A Day Will Come	Francine	
1934	The Uncle from Peking	Huguette	
1935	Quelle drôle de gosse!	La bonne de Gaston	
1935	Odette	Jacqueline	
1935	Wedding Night	Madeleine	
1935	Et moi, j'te dis qu'elle t'a fait de l'oeil	Suzanne Lambertier	
1935	The Mysteries of Paris		
1936	Les pattes de mouche	Clarisse	
1936	La guerre des gosses	Aline Sorbier	
1936	You Are Me	Maricousa Hernandez	
1936	On the Road	Simone	
1937	Ignace	Monique Durosier	
1937	Un scandale aux galeries	Yvette	
1938	Le tigre du Bengale	Irène Sorbier	
1938	The Indian Tomb	Irène Sorbier	
1938	Barnabé	Jackie Petit-Durand	
1938	Prince of My Heart	Katia	
1940	Narcisse	Josette	
1940	Le roi des galéjeurs	Nina	
1946	Master Love	La capitaine des girls	
1951	Atoll K	La secrétaire	
1952	Her Last Christmas	Lucie Vilardi	
1953	Midnight Witness	Madame Montet	
1956	The Adventures of Gil Blas	Camille	
1956	Don Juan		Uncredited, (final film role)

== Bibliography ==
- Goble, Alan. The Complete Index to Literary Sources in Film. Walter de Gruyter, 1999.
