= Olympia 81 =

Studio album by Dalida
- Released: 1981
- Recorded: 1981
- Genres: World music; pop; adult contemporary
- Labels: Orlando International Shows; Carrere

Dalida chronology
Gigi in Paradisco (1980)	Olympia 81 (1981)	Special Dalida (1982)

Olympia 81 is a French-language album released in 1981 by Italian-French singer Dalida. The album was highly successful and received a gold certification.

== Background ==
Olympia 81 is named after the last series of concerts that Dalida held at the Olympia theatre to celebrate the twenty-fifth anniversary of her singing career, which was met by phenomenal success. The album includes various style of songs, some of which are personal and are inspired from Dalida's life like "À ma manière" and "Partir ou mourir". Other songs from the album are dance songs like "La feria" and "Chanteur des années 80". Among notable songs of the album, "Il pleut sur Bruxelles" is a tribute to late Belgian singer Jacques Brel.

Dalida released seven singles from the album while all the other songs of the album benefited from television promotion.

Upon release of the album, Dalida was awarded a "Diamond Disk Award" from the European music industry for her career spanning over 25 years of continuous success and 85 million records sold during a special ceremony held in her honour. Dalida was the first artist to have ever received such an award and distinction in the history of the Music Hall.

== Track listing ==
1. "Une femme à quarante ans"
2. "Il pleut sur Bruxelles"
3. "L'Amour et moi"
4. "Le Slow de ma vie"
5. "Marjolaine"
6. "Fini, la comédie"
7. "Et la vie continuera"
8. "La feria"
9. "J'm'appelle amnésie"
10. "Partir ou mourir"
11. "Chanteur des années 80"
12. "À ma manière"

== Singles ==
- "Chanteur des années 80"/"À ma manière"

"Chanteur des années 80"/"À ma manière" was the first single from the album, released in 1980, prior to the release of the album, and was extensively promoted on television and radio. Among notable TV performances for these two titles, Dalida sang both songs live in the French prime time TV show Stars.

- "Fini, la comédie"/"Marjolaine"

"Fini, la comédie"/"Marjolaine" was released as a double-sided singles in France and Europe in 1981, as part of the promotion campaign following the release of the album. The songs were performed on international awards shows where Dalida was granted high-profile awards such as the Golden Europa Award in Germany where Dalida received the award for most popular female artist.

- "Il pleut sur Bruxelles"/"Et la vie continuera"

"Il pleut sur Bruxelles"/"Et la vie continuera" was released during the Olympia 81 series of concerts in Paris. Most of the television performances of "Il pleut sur Bruxelles" were sung live by Dalida with a live orchestra.

- "Americana"/"Une femme à quarante ans"

"Americana" was not available on the album and was a summer single recorded and released by Dalida in 1981. Dalida filmed a video clip for this song to promote it. The B-side, Une femme à quarante ans, is an album song written and composed by Didier Barbelivien that talks about women over 40 and their maturity in life.
