= Lucienne Boyer =

French diseuse and singer

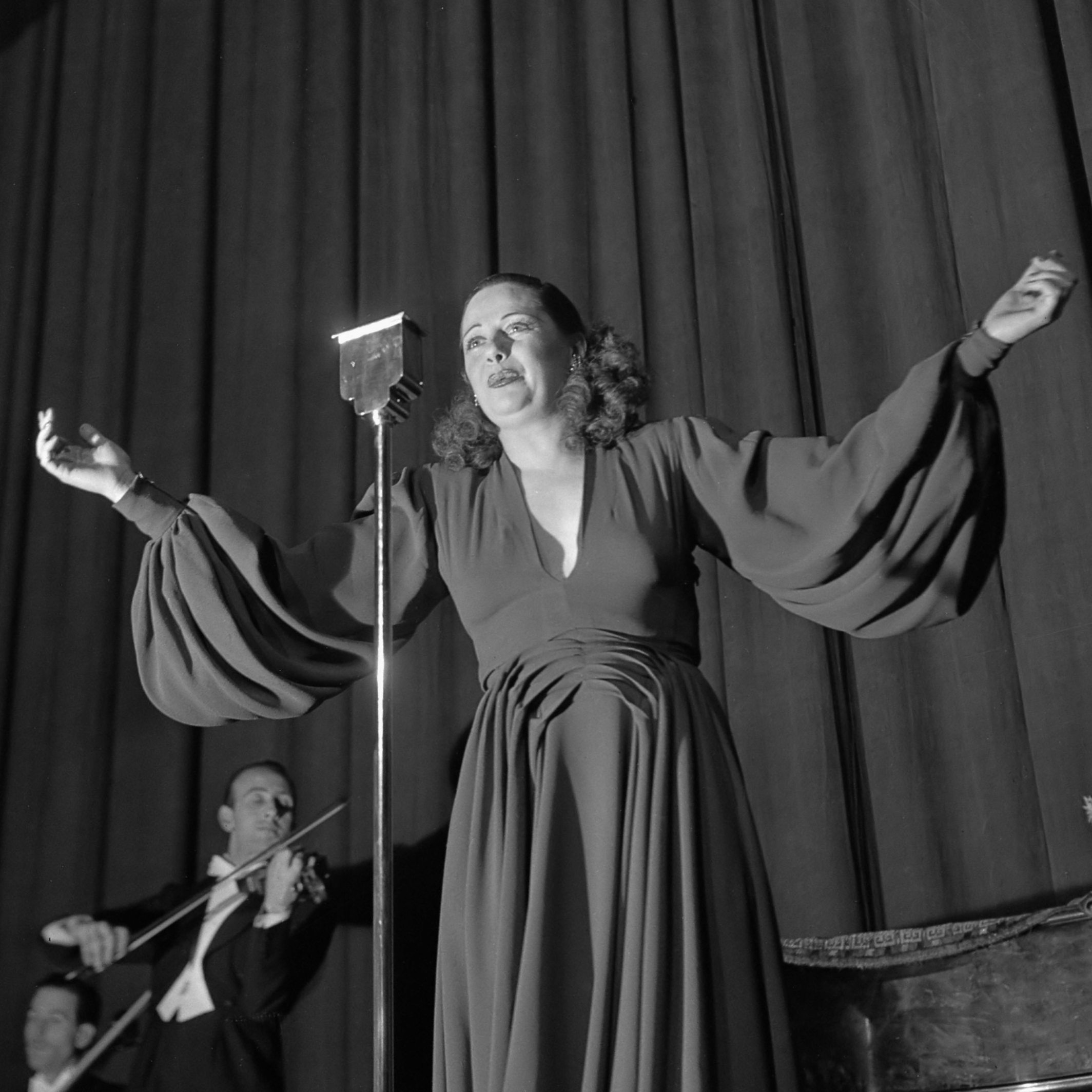
- Boyer in 1945
- Born: Émilienne-Henriette Boyer; 18 August 1901; Paris, France
- Died: 6 December 1983 (aged 82); Paris, France
- Occupation: Singer
- Spouse: Jacques Pills (m. 1939; div. 1951)
- Children: Jacqueline Boyer

Lucienne Boyer (18 August 1901 – 6 December 1983) was a French entertainer and musician, best known for her song "Parlez-moi d'amour". Her impresario was Bruno Coquatrix. According to The New York Times, she "reigned as queen of Paris nightlife during the 1930s".

== Early career ==
She was born Émilienne-Henriette Boyer in Montparnasse, Paris, France. Her melodious voice gave her the chance to begin singing in cabarets at age 16, while also working as a part-time model. An office position at a prominent Parisian theater opened the door for her and within a few years, under the name Lucienne Boyer, she began singing in major Parisian music halls.

== Popular success ==
In 1927, Boyer sang at a concert featuring Félix Mayol, where she was seen by the American impresario Lee Shubert, who immediately offered her a contract to work on Broadway. Boyer spent nine months in New York City, returning to perform there and to South America numerous times throughout the 1930s.

By 1933, she had made a large number of recordings for Columbia Records of France, including her signature song, "Parlez-moi d'amour" (Speak to Me of Love). Written by Jean Lenoir, the song won the first-ever Grand Prix du Disque of the Charles Cros Academy.

== Personal life ==
Boyer's father died while he served as a soldier in World War I. Due to the loss, she worked in a munitions factory to provide for her family.

In 1939, she married the cabaret singer Jacques Pills of the musical duo Pills et Tabet. Their daughter, Jacqueline, was born on 23 April 1941. Following in their footsteps, Jacqueline became a singer who went on to win the Eurovision Song Contest in 1960.

Throughout World War II, Boyer continued to perform in France, but for her Jewish husband, it was a very difficult time. Following the Allied Forces liberation of France, her cabaret career flourished and for another thirty years, she maintained a loyal following. At the age of 73, she sang with her daughter at the famous Paris Olympia and appeared on several French television shows.

== Death ==
In 1983, Boyer died in Paris and was interred in the Cimetière de Bagneux in Montrouge.
