= Boulevard des Capucines (Monet) =

1873 painting by Claude Monet

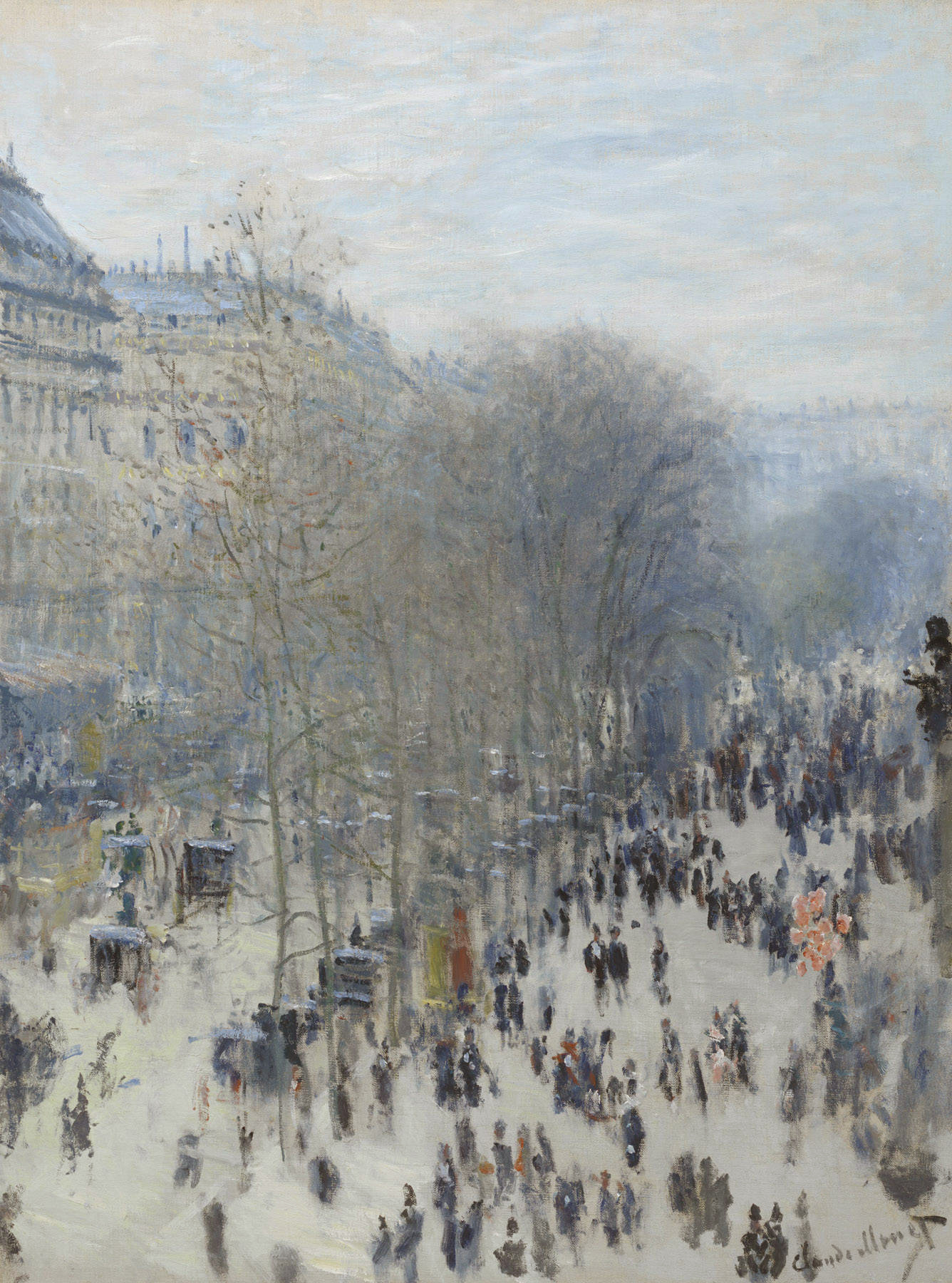
- Artist: Claude Monet
- Year: 1873-74
- Medium: Oil on canvas
- Dimensions: 80.3 cm × 60.3 cm (31.6 in × 23.75 in)
- Location: Nelson-Atkins Museum of Art; Kansas City

Boulevard des Capucines is the title of two oil-on-canvas paintings depicting the famous Paris boulevard by French Impressionist artist Claude Monet, created between 1873–1874. One version is vertical in format and depicts a snowy street scene looking down the boulevard towards the Place de l'Opéra. The other version is a horizontal composition and shows the same street on a sunny winter day; it is housed at The Pushkin State Museum of Fine Arts in Moscow and is believed to be the version that was exhibited at the first Impressionist exhibit in 1874.

Monet painted the works from the photography studio of Félix Nadar at 35 Boulevard des Capucines. The elevated vantage point and loose brushstrokes allow the audience to see the commotion of the boulevard from a position high above street level. Certain aspects of the paintings have parallels in the photography of Monet's day and in Japanese prints, which may have influenced Monet.

== Background ==
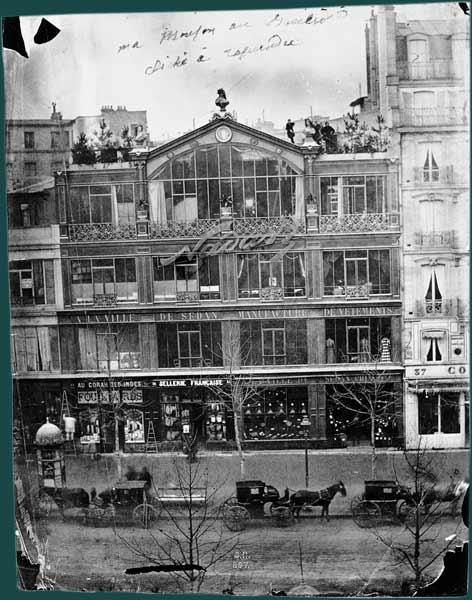
Félix Nadar's studio at 35 Boulevard des Capucines

The effects of industrialization and modernity on the landscape were a frequent preoccupation of the Impressionists. The streets of Paris surrounding the Opera house were reconstructed during the Second Empire by George-Eugène Haussmann. Monet painted the scenes of this "new" Paris, including the famous Boulevard des Capucines, from 1867 to 1878. The first Impressionist exhibit, arranged by the "Société Anonyme des Artistes Peintres, Sculpteurs, Graveurs, etc.," was held at 35 Boulevard des Capucines in the studio of prominent photographer Félix Nadar from April 15 to May 15, 1874, the same location where Monet painted Boulevard des Capucines. In addition to Monet, works by Cézanne, Degas, Morisot, Pissarro, Renoir, and Sisley were displayed. The movement's name grew out of this exhibit, which was harshly critiqued by Louis Leroy. Mocking Monet’s Impression, Sunrise, Leroy used the word "impression" to describe these artists' work, a name that stuck with them moving forward. Jules-Antoine Castagnary, another critic of the first Impressionist exhibit in 1874, further elaborated on this line of thinking, writing "they are impressionist in the sense that they render not the landscape but the sensation produced by the landscape."

== Description ==
=== Pushkin Museum version ===
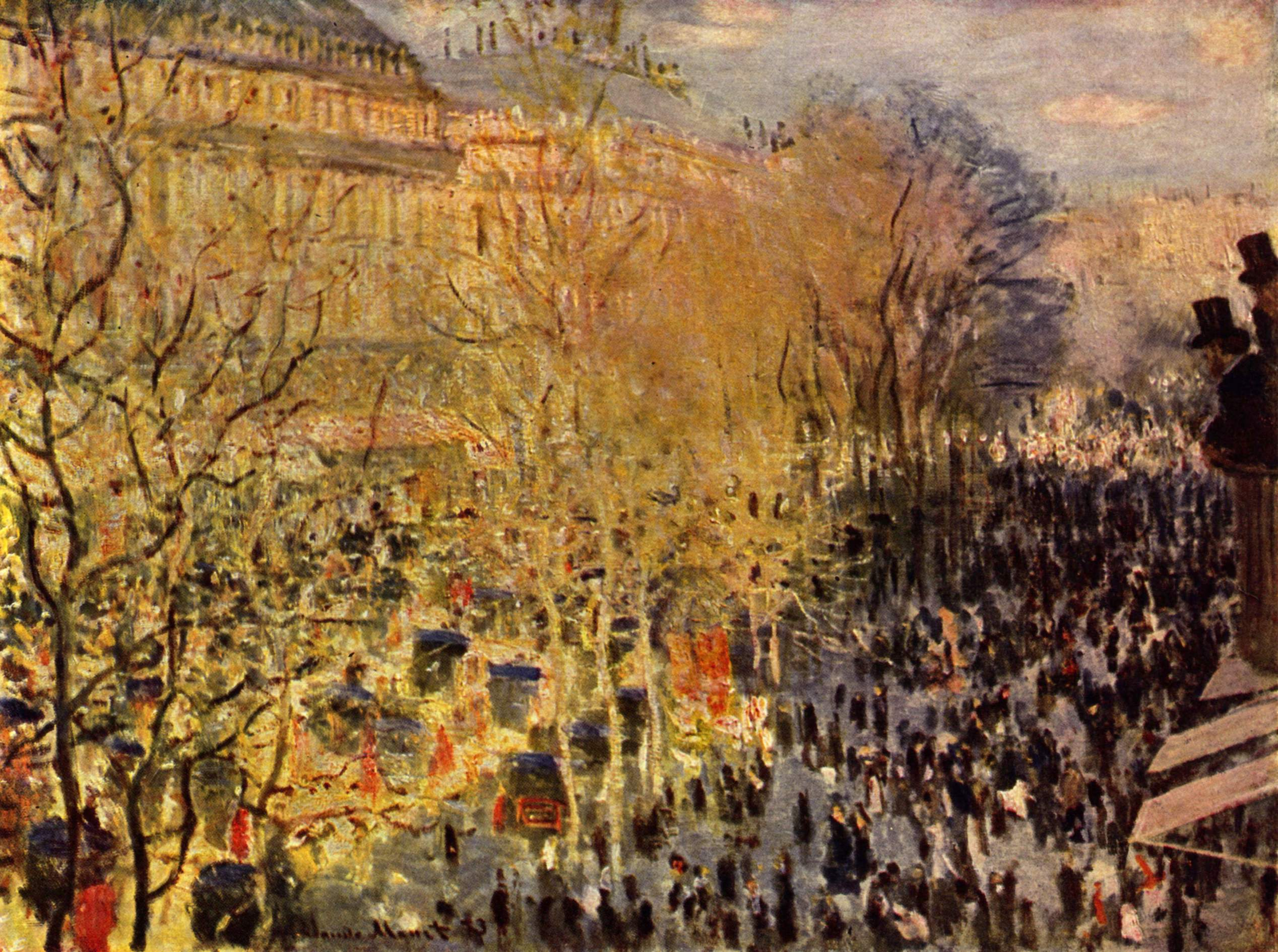
Claude Monet, Boulevard des Capucines (Pushkin State Museum), 1873-1874

The horizontal version of the painting is in The Pushkin State Museum of Fine Arts, Moscow, and it captures a sunny mid-afternoon in winter during which the buildings cast a shadow on the foreground of the painting. Different times of day, lighting, weather conditions, and orientation of the canvas were all aspects that Monet experimented with in his paintings and the two versions of Boulevard des Capucines are consistent with this exploration.

The horizontal version of the painting is often believed by scholars to be the version that was shown at the first Impressionist exhibit in 1874. The critical response to Boulevard des Capucines at the exhibit was mixed. Louis Leroy was extremely critical of the blurred pedestrians, labeling them as “black-tongue lickings” in "L’Exposition des impressionnistes" in Le Charivari, April 25, 1874. However, Ernest Chesneau responded positively in Paris-Journal, May 7, 1874, noting the "extraordinary animation of the public street" that Monet captured in the painting. The art historian Joel Isaacson has questioned whether the vertical version of Boulevard des Capucines would have elicited the same level of feeling from critics if it were displayed at the first Impressionist exhibit since the vertical scene is more muted in color and presentation.

=== Nelson-Atkins Museum version ===
The snowy vertical scene Boulevard des Capucines is housed at The Nelson-Atkins Museum in Kansas City. The painting depicts a snowy winter scene on the Boulevard des Capucines facing the Place de l'Opera. Along the left side of the painting, receding into the background, are the multistory buildings that were redone as a part of Haussmann's reconstruction of Paris, including the distinguished Grand Hôtel. The boulevard is crowded with people strolling, horse-drawn carriages, vendors, and shoppers. The prominent yellow and brown object in the foreground along the tree line is known as a Morris advertising column, and a large cluster of reddish-pink balloons occupies the right foreground. On the right edge of the painting, there are figures wearing top-hats standing on the neighboring balcony and gazing down on the activity of the street below. The pattern of the people on the street implies a slow unhurried walk down the sidewalk, which suggests that Monet has captured the moment when a street performance has just finished and the pedestrians are breaking off in small groups.

== Analysis ==
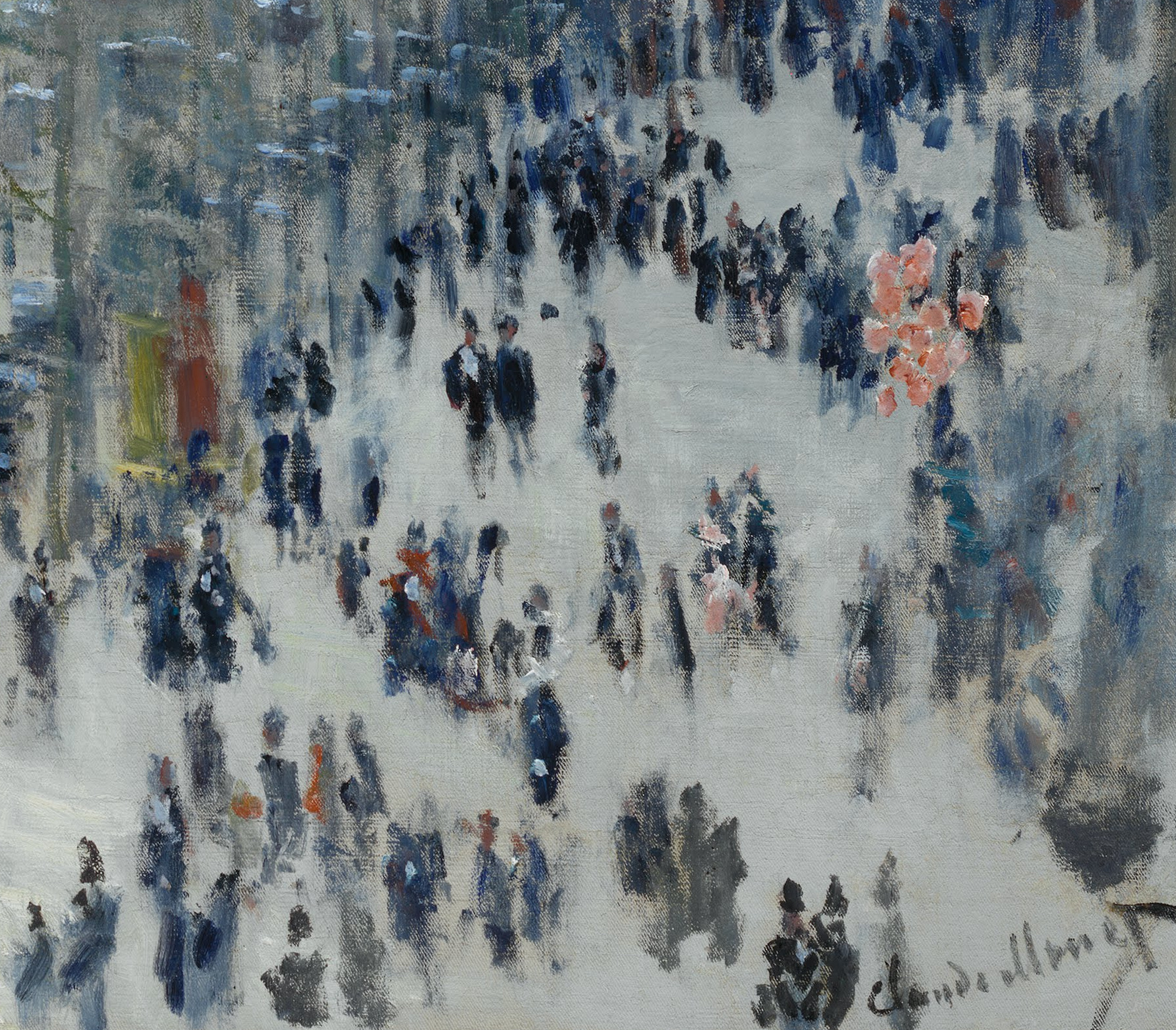
Claude Monet, Boulevard des Capucines, (detail showing the blurred figures)

Monet’s use of high vantage point perspective and loose brushstrokes were representative of a style he began using in the late 1860s. High vantage points generally decrease the amount of sky available in the painting by forcing the horizon line upwards. Additionally, the elevated vantage point minimizes the background-to-foreground tonal contrast and color saturation, while also making the viewer feel that the scene is tilted towards them. The audience is able view the commotion of the boulevard from an elevated distance, which allows them to study the scene but remain withdrawn from the action. The movement of the busy scene on the boulevard, the pedestrians and horse-drawn carriages, is implied by the blurry figures that Monet painted with loose black brushstrokes intended to be suggestive of the black coats that the French bourgeoisie wore, their habits noirs. These abrupt and short brushstrokes form the pedestrians in splotches of uniform color and create the image of a crowded sidewalk without explicit structured silhouettes. In its lighting, the painting uses a technique that Monet would later refer to as "the envelopment, the same light spread over everywhere."

From the beginning of the 1870s, Monet experimented with the texture of his canvas and the effect it had on the painting, favoring a thin layer of "à grain priming" on fine weave twill canvases. The diagonal weave of the canvas in the Nelson-Atkins version of Boulevard des Capucines can be seen prominently in the way that Monet applied color over the single primed surface. The paint catches the raised part of the weave of the canvas leaving the depressed primed section untouched. This creates a distinction between the light and dark portions of the canvas that "gives shimmering effects that evoke both the wintery atmosphere and the sensation of distance" between the viewer and the blurred pedestrians below.

== Influences ==
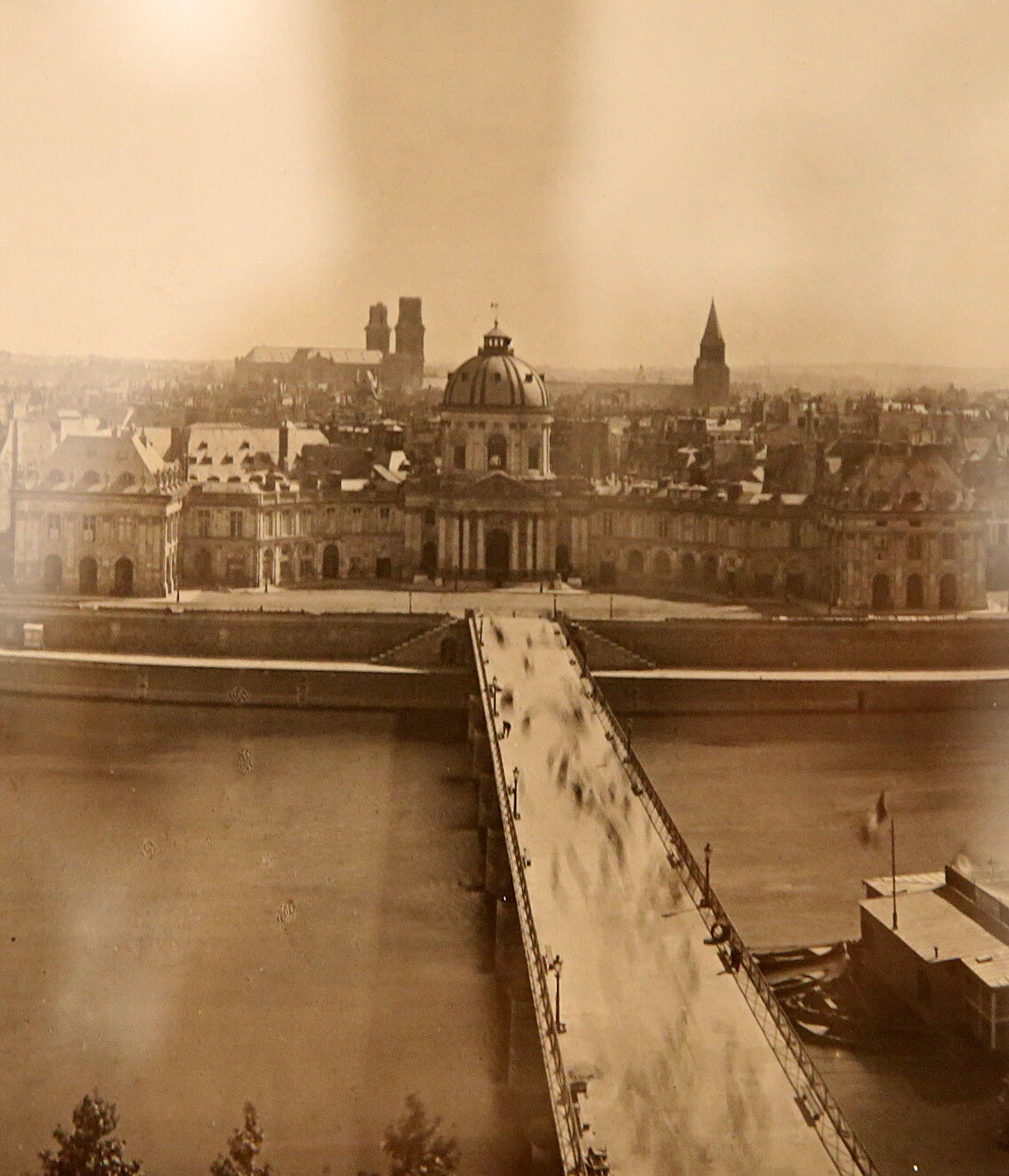
Adolphe Braun, Panorama of Paris (detail showing Pont des Arts), 1867

Contemporary photographic techniques and limitations may have influenced Monet’s painting. Due to the slow shutter speeds of early cameras, moving objects were often blurry in photographs. The blurred pedestrians in the painting are reminiscent of how a camera from the period would capture individuals walking at a normal speed. Adolphe Braun, a prominent photographer of the time, may also have been an influence on Monet. Braun's photographs from a high vantage point, capturing blurred figures beneath a high horizon, are similar to Monet’s view of Boulevard des Capucines from the elevated second story of Nadar’s studio. Monet’s blurred pedestrians walking on the boulevard evoke the people crossing Pont des Arts in Braun's photograph Panorama of Paris, which was captured from the Quai du Louvre.

Impressionist painters were influenced by Japanese prints as well. These prints also shared some of devices of early photography like high horizon lines and "cropped figures and objects."

== See also ==
- List of paintings by Claude Monet
