= Prince of My Heart =

1938 film

- Belgian poster
- Directed by: Jacques Daniel-Norman
- Written by: Jacques Daniel-Norman; Francis Didelot
- Produced by: Jacques Daniel-Norman
- Starring: Reda Caire; Claude May; Colette Darfeuil
- Cinematography: Marc Bujard
- Edited by: Mireille Bessette
- Music by: Vincent Scotto
- Production company: Fornor Films
- Release date: 17 November 1938
- Running time: 106 minutes
- Country: France
- Language: French

Prince of My Heart (French: Prince de mon coeur) is a 1938 French comedy film directed by Jacques Daniel-Norman and starring Reda Caire, Claude May and Colette Darfeuil. The film's sets were designed by the art director Claude Bouxin.

== Synopsis ==
Prince Serge is pursued to Paris by one of his subjects Katia, a woman seeking revenge for a wrong done to one of her friends.

== Cast ==
- Reda Caire as Le prince Serge III
- Claude May as Katia
- Pierre Larquey as Sekow - le préfet de police
- Colette Darfeuil as Mirette
- Jean Témerson as Tsoupoff - le chambellan
- Thérèse Dorny as Isabelle Gatemouille
- Gaston Gabaroche as Le professeur Csortos
- Jeanine Roger as Nadia
- Jean Toulout as Yvan - le piqeur
- Simone Cerdan as La princesse Carina
- Roland Toutain as James Okay - le journaliste
- Marcel Vallée as Le baron Midor
- Georges Paulais as Le bijoutier

== Bibliography ==
- Bessy, Maurice & Chirat, Raymond. Histoire du cinéma français: 1935-1939. Pygmalion, 1986.
- Crisp, Colin. Genre, Myth and Convention in the French Cinema, 1929-1939. Indiana University Press, 2002.
- Rège, Philippe. Encyclopedia of French Film Directors, Volume 1. Scarecrow Press, 2009.
