= Jean-Michel Boris =

French artistic director (1933–2020)

- Born: Jean-Michel Possicelsky; 14 February 1933; Bordeaux, France
- Died: 5 November 2020 (aged 87); Paris, France
- Occupation: Artistic director

Jean-Michel Boris (14 February 1933 – 5 November 2020) was a French artistic director. He was Director General of the concert hall Olympia from 1979 to 2001.

== Biography ==
Jean-Michel was the son of film distributor Jacques Boris and Anne-Marie Bargues. He was also the nephew of Bruno Coquatrix. He moved from Bordeaux to Paris at the age of 21 to study medicine, but was dissuaded by his uncle, who offered him a job at the Olympia. He began working there on 5 November 1954 as a machinist. He subsequently learned how to work as an electrician, projectionist, sound designer, manager, and programmer.

Boris became artistic director of the Olympia in 1959, co-director in 1970, and director general in 1979 following the death of Coquatrix. He would stay in this position until 17 July 2001. He served a total of 47 years at the Olympia. He became an Officer of the Ordre national du Mérite on 11 February 1999, and an Officer of the Legion of Honour on 4 December 2001. He was also a member of the Académie Charles Cros and was in charge of programming at the Théâtre Déjazet from 2001 to 2002.

Jean-Michel Boris died in Paris on 5 November 2020 at the age of 87 after contracting COVID-19.

== Publications ==
- 28 boulevard des Capucines : la fabuleuse aventure de l'Olympia (1991)
- Olympia Bruno Coquatrix, 50 ans de music-hall (2003)
- L’Olympia Bruno Coquatrix : 50 ans de concerts mythiques 1954-2004 (2003)
- Docteur Renaud... (2004)
- Marc Lavoine (2006)
- Monstres sacrés : portraits de la chanson (2011)
- Mort Schumann : le géant de porcelaine (2011)
- Journal et autres carnets inédits (2014)
- Le cadeau d'une vie (2016)
