= Georges Tabet =

French Algerian screenwriter

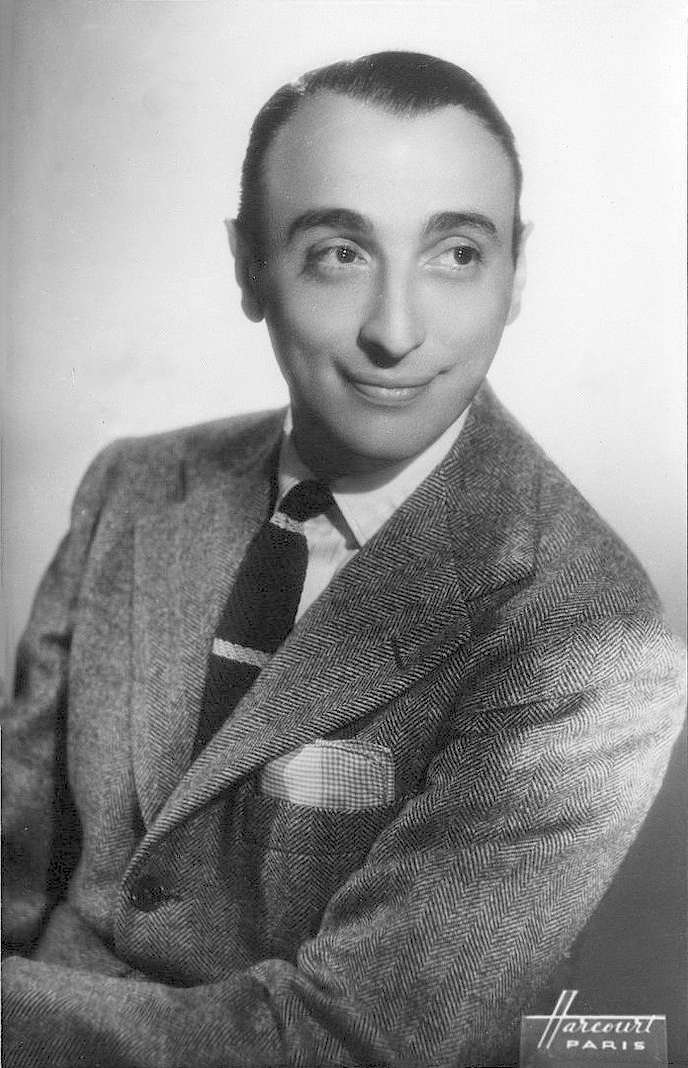
- 1935
- Born: 23 January 1905; Algiers, French Algeria
- Died: 28 February 1984 (aged 79); Paris, France
- Occupations: Actor, writer, musician
- Years active: 1932–1974 (film)

Georges Tabet (23 January 1905 – 28 February 1984) was a French Algerian actor, musician and screenwriter. During the 1930s he appeared frequently alongside Jacques Pills.

== Selected filmography ==
=== Actor ===
- A Gentleman of the Ring (1932)
- Mademoiselle Josette, My Woman (1933)
- On the Road (1936)
- You Are Me (1936)
- Monsieur Fabre (1951)
- The Two Girls (1951)
- The Green Glove (1952)
- My Priest Among the Rich (1952)
- Full House (1952)
- Her Last Christmas (1952)
- In the Land of the Sun (1952)
- Stain in the Snow (1954)

=== Writer ===
- It's the Paris Life (1954)
- The Blue Danube (1955)
- Folies-Bergère (1957)
- Girls of the Night (1958)
- Witness in the City (1959)
- The Loves of Salammbo (1960)
- Les Yeux cernés (1964)
- La Grande Vadrouille (1966)
- The Oldest Profession (1967)
- Le Temps des loups (1970)
- La Part des lions (1971)

== Bibliography ==
- Goble, Alan. The Complete Index to Literary Sources in Film. Walter de Gruyter, 1999.
