= Jacques Pills =

French singer and actor (1906–1970)

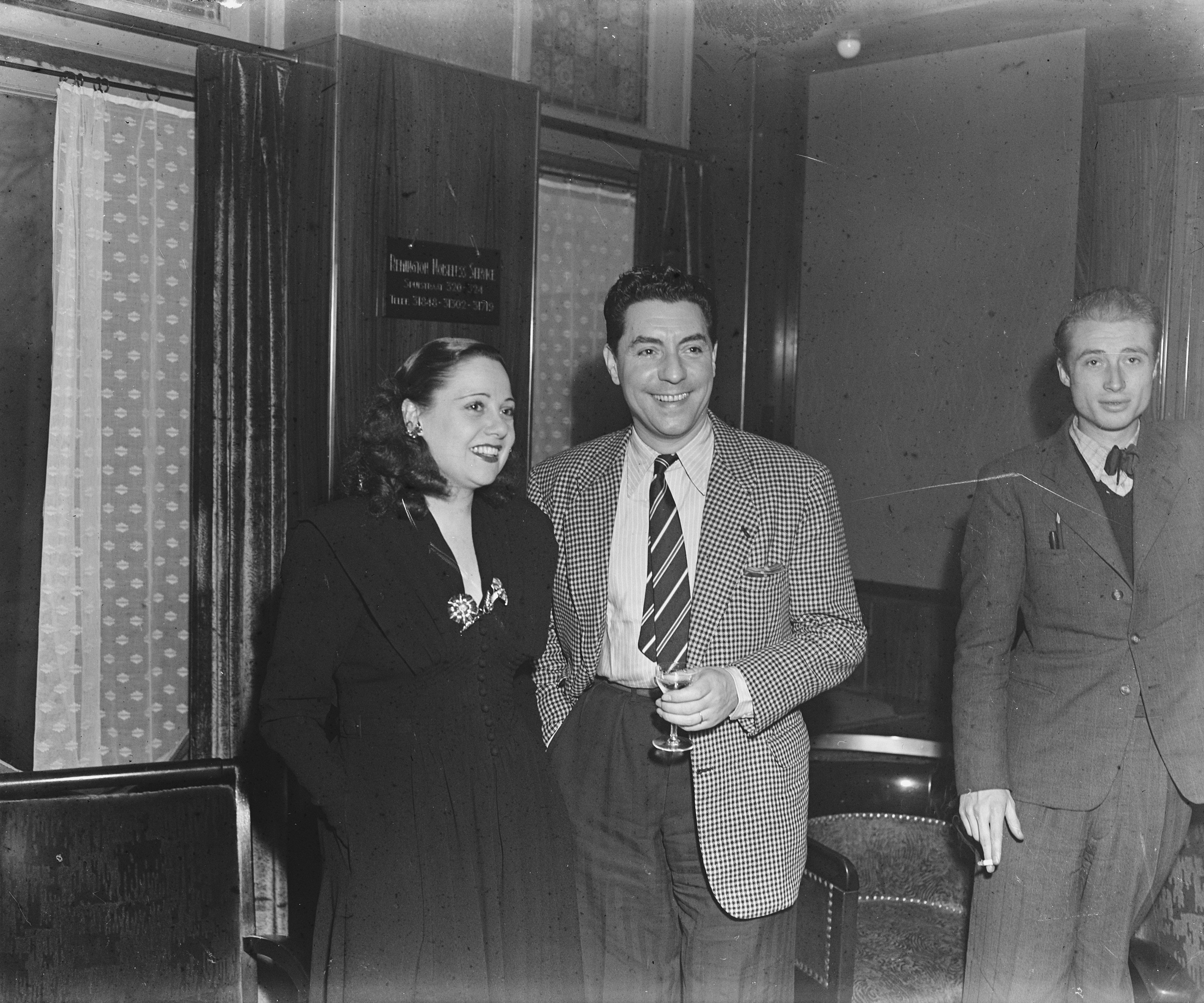
- Lucienne Boyer and Pills in 1945
- Born: Rene Jacques Ducos; 6 March 1906; Tulle, France
- Died: 12 September 1970 (aged 64)
- Occupations: Singer; actor
- Spouses: Lucienne Boyer (m. 1939; div. 1951); Édith Piaf (m. 1952; div. 1957)
- Children: Jacqueline Boyer
- Musical career

Jacques Pills (born René Jacques Ducos; 6 March 1906 – 12 September 1970) was a French singer and actor. His impresario was Bruno Coquatrix. In 1959, Pills was the Monegasque entrant at the Eurovision Song Contest 1959 with the song "Mon ami Pierrot". The song ended last, in eleventh place and got only one point.

During the 1930s he appeared frequently alongside Georges Tabet.

== Personal life ==
He married singer Lucienne Boyer in 1939 and they were divorced in 1951. On 20 September 1952, he married singer Édith Piaf. However, in 1957, this marriage also ended in divorce. He was the father of Jacqueline Boyer, who won the 1960 Eurovision contest the year after her father's participation. Upon his death, he became the first Eurovision contestant to die.

== Selected filmography ==
- 1953 – Boum sur Paris
- 1949 – Une femme par jour
- 1945 – Alone in the Night
- 1945 – Marie la Misere
- 1942 – Pension Jonas
- 1936 – Toi, c'est moi
- 1936 – Prends la route
- 1934 – Princesse Czardas
- 1933 – Mademoiselle Josette, My Woman
- 1932 – A Gentleman of the Ring

Preceded by None	Monaco in the Eurovision Song Contest; 1959	Succeeded by François Deguelt
