= Charles Toché =

French painter (1851–1916)

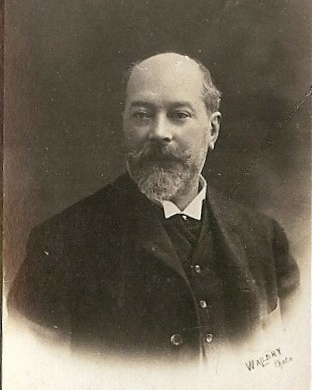
Charles Toché; by Walery (c. 1908)

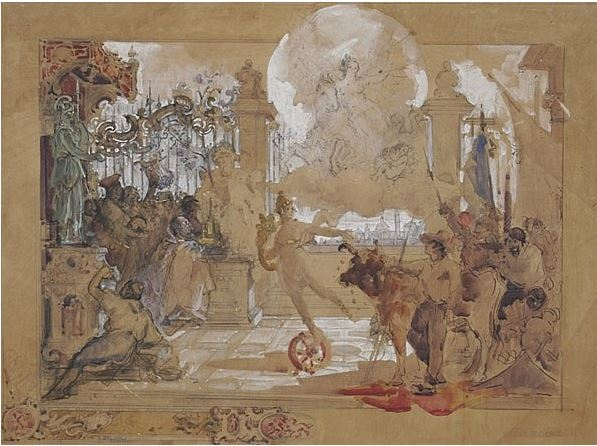
Peace and Happiness

Charles Toché (26 July 1851, Nantes – 31 August 1916, Paris) was a French decorative artist, painter, poster artist and illustrator.

== Biography ==
His father, Émile François Toché (1802-1884), was a shipowner. He originally planned to become an architect and studied with Félix Thomas, who had participated in the first excavation of Nineveh. After completing his studies, he travelled through Spain and the Middle East, then went to Venice, where he studied and made sketches of the buildings. While there, he made the acquaintance of Édouard Manet, who inspired him to pursue painting.

From 1875 to 1888, he worked on a large project: painting historical and allegorical frescoes in the Grand Galerie of the Château de Chenonceau. When they had been completed, he created designs for the Chateau's stained glass. During his work there, he met the writer, Gustave Flaubert, who asked him to illustrate the definitive edition of his novel, The Temptation of Saint Anthony.

In 1880, he painted decorations in Le Chabanais; a famous brothel. This earned him the nickname, "Pubis de Chabanais" (a play on Puvis de Chavannes).

His first public exhibition came in 1887, at the Galerie Georges Petit, where he displayed the drawings he had made for the frescoes at Chenonceau. At the Exposition Universelle of 1889, he helped decorate several of the pavilions; including the Liberal Arts, Republic of South Africa, Argentina, and Viticulture. He also designed one of the posters for the event. Later, he created frescoes at the Théâtre Graslin in Nantes and at the Olympia in Paris. In 1893, he produced a series of illustrations on the history of costume for the World's Columbian Exposition in Chicago.

Some of his posters may be seen at the Bibliothèque Nationale de France.
