= Olympia (Paris) =

Music hall in France

Coordinates: 48°52′13″N 2°19′42″E

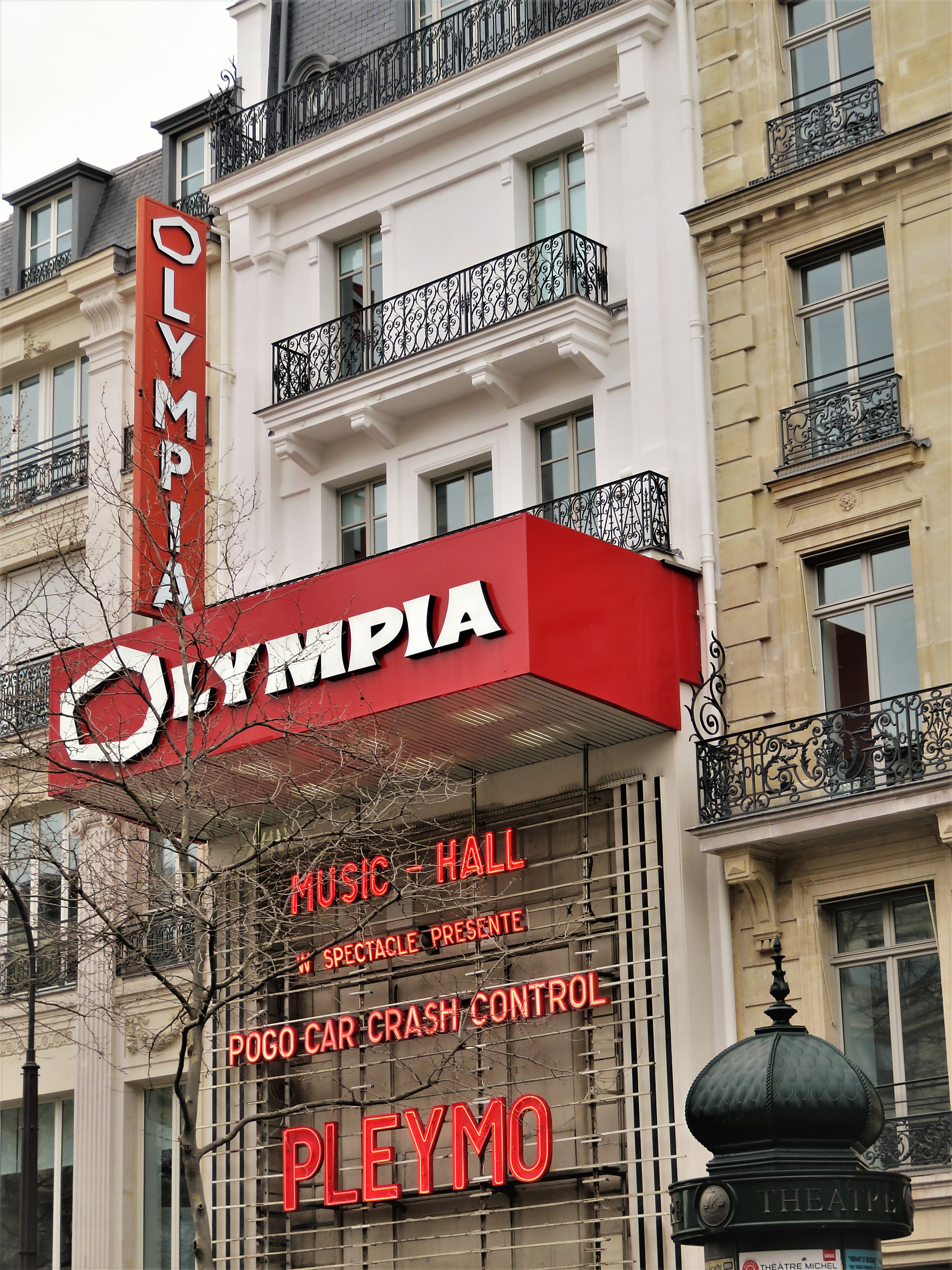
- View from Boulevard des Capucines in 2018
- Interactive map of Olympia
- Full name: Olympia
- Former names: Montagnes Russes (1888–1892); Olympia (1893–1929, 1940–1944, 2015–present); Olympia–Théâtre Jacques Haïk (1930–1940, 1946–1954); Olympia–Bruno Coquatrix (1954–1997, 1997–2014)
- Address: 28 Boulevard des Capucines; 75009 Paris, France
- Location: 9th arrondissement
- Owner: Groupe Canal+(Bolloré)
- Capacity: 1,985 (seated); 2,824 (concert)

Construction
- Built: 1892
- Opened: 12 April 1893
- Renovated: 1930, 1938, 1954, 1956, 1979, 1997, 2019
- Closed: 1916–18, 1944–46
- Demolished: 1997
- Rebuilt: 1997

Website
- www.olympiahall.com

The Olympia (French pronunciation: [ɔlɛ̃pja]; commonly known as L'Olympia or in the English-speaking world as Olympia Hall) is a concert venue in the 9th arrondissement of Paris, France, located at 28 Boulevard des Capucines, equidistant from La Madeleine, Paris and Opéra Garnier, 300 metres (980 ft) north of the Place Vendôme. The nearest metro and RER stations are Madeleine, Opéra, Havre–Caumartin, and Auber.

The hall was opened in 1893 by one of the two co-creators of the Moulin Rouge venue, and saw many opera, ballet, and music hall performances. Theatrical performances declined in the late 1920s and the Olympia was converted into a cinema, before re-opening as a venue in 1954 with Bruno Coquatrix as executive director. Since the 1960s it has been a popular venue for rock bands.

The Olympia was threatened with demolition in the early 1990s, but saved by a preservation order. Inevitably included in a group of buildings that were part of an extensive renovation project, the entire edifice was demolished and rebuilt in 1997. The venue's facade and its interior were preserved. Vivendi acquired the Olympia in 2001 and it remains a popular venue. The venue is easily recognized by the giant white-on-red glowing letters announcing its name.

== History ==
=== Origins ===
In 1880, the entrepreneur Josep Oller purchased grounds and converted them into a horse racing venue. In 1882, he created innovative mechanisms to interact the exit of the horses with the distribution of tickets.

In 1888, with the money earned from these investments, he imported a wooden roller coaster from England. In the same year, Oller collaborated with Charles Zidler to build the roller coaster in the courtyard on 28 Boulevard des Capucines in the 9th arrondissement of Paris, near the Opéra Garnier, at the time of Baron Haussmann's urban renovation. Named the Montagnes Russes, it would be considered one of the first wider amusement parks in history. In 1889, Oller and Zidler co-founded the Moulin Rouge in Pigalle.

In 1892, the Prefect of Police feared a conflagration and ordered the Montagnes Russes' closure and ban. It was then demolished. In that year, supervised by architect Léon Carle, a steel building foundation was constructed and erected in the same place. The interior fittings were conceived by decorators and painters Charles Toché, Marcel Jambon, and Etienne Cornellier. It contained panels in Sarreguemines' faience, and the murals highlighted painting technique marouflage, illustrating English castles and landscapes, echoing the dominant popular style. The Baccarat crystal glass company created the girandoles and chandeliers, while the electrical installation work was carried out by the company Eclairage Electrique. Oller's primary intention was to propose a defining location of luxury and glamor in Paris.

=== Opening and early years ===
On 12 April 1893, the 2,000 capacity venue named L'Olympia was inaugurated as the first Parisian music hall, featuring acrobats, cross-dressers, and a can-can dance performance of La Goulue. The Olympia's gala opening reception drew Paris' wealthiest, the aristocratic, and powerful people. Admission was restricted to a chosen few, the prince–princess, baron–baroness, and count. It also featured the Duke of Morny and figures from the sporting-club, Le Mirliton cabaret, and the jockey-club of the rue Royale.

In a city that only had cafés-concerts, the Olympia with its spacious hall attracted all Parisians enjoying ventriloquists, juggler acts, and numerous ballets and revues. The music hall staged operettas and also pantomimes. Loie Fuller, La Goulue, Leopoldo Fregoli, Dranem, Ouvrard, and Mistinguett were regularly billed at the venue. The Olympia was a "first-class theater", although it retained the colloquial atmosphere of the cafés-concerts in its large surface area divided into two themes, concert, and theater. To differentiate itself from the Folies Bergère, the Olympia imposed itself a different scheduling system by presenting its new ballet creations over a duration of weeks rather than months, alternating with the oldest ones revamped. The ballet blanc was the first Olympia's ballet. The venue demonstrated the dominance of the striptease pantomime Le Coucher de la Mariée, which became the "longest-running and most profitable show in the 1890s". Along with the Folies Bergère, the Olympia scheduled appearances by some "stars" such as La Belle Otero, Émilienne d'Alençon, and Liane de Pougy.

In 1895, Oller, overflowing with activities, opened a museum of wax's mannequins in the basements of the Olympia, representing a visual history of the world from the Passion of Christ to the French Revolution, until the modernity of that time.

However, in 1896, Oller found no more challenge in his multiple projects, and boredom took over. He named chief conductor Oscar de Lagoanaire as director of the music hall, which became a business failure. That same year, the screenings of the first films of the Lumière brothers were scheduled, which were new technologies at that time.

=== Development ===
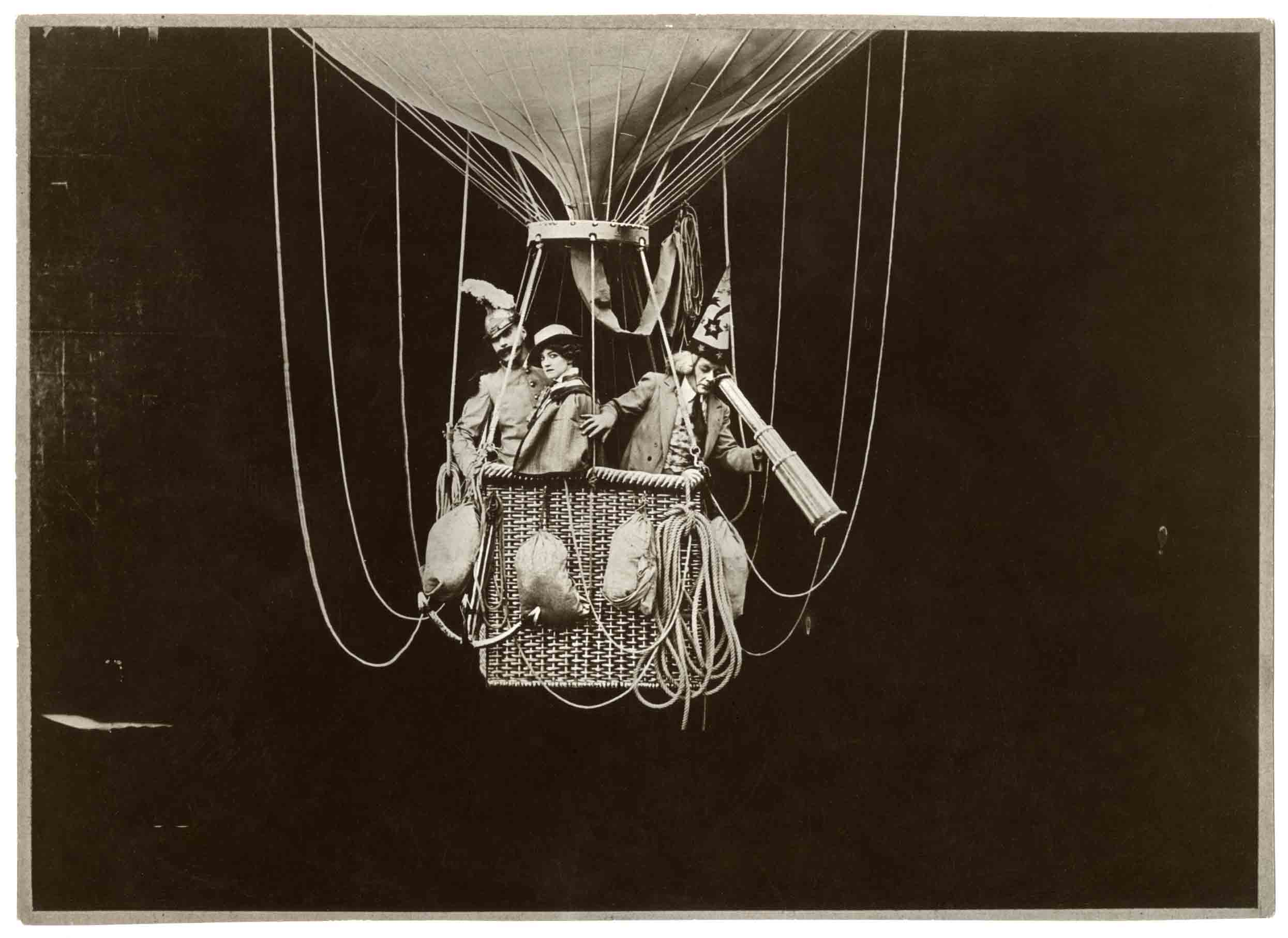
The Isola brothers commissioned cinema pioneer Georges Méliès to create a film component for the ballet production Vers les étoiles, presented in 1906 at the Olympia. This production still has survived; the film is believed to be lost.

In 1898, brothers Émile and Vincent Isola, two magicians who began a career as Paris' venue executive directors, became the commercial tenants of the Olympia, as well as of the most popular theaters in the city, such as the Folies Bergère in 1901 and the Gaîté-Lyrique in 1903. The Isola brothers brought attractions from all over the world to Olympia, playing host to multiple entertainment types, and increased the proportion and the spectacular. There were extravagant circus-themed parties with clowns, Contortionists, and the inclusion of exotic singing and dancing. The venue also featured acrobatic performances and wild animals such as seals, monkeys, elephants, and zebras. Furthermore, the French author Colette mimed entirely naked.

Ballets, pantomimes, and operettas became more prominent with larger productions, which led to the Olympia becoming a direct rival to the Opéra Garnier, notably with ballets as Charles Lecocq's Barbe-bleue and Henri Hirschmann's Néron in 1898, and Paul Vidal's L'Impératrice in 1901. Despite the success of the ballets attested by La Belle Aux Cheveux d'Or and Sardanapale, the preferences of Émile and Vincent Isola settled firmly towards operettas, especially revues. Of the few ballets appearances, a limited number of restaged productions from Louis Ganne ensued at the Olympia, such as Au Japon in 1903, performed for the first time at London's Alhambra. Phryné was restaged in 1904, initially performed at the Folies Bergère and at Royan's Casino. The revues at the Olympia were choreographed by prominent figures, as Alfredo Curti, exemplified by Olympia Revue in 1903 and Au Music-Hall in 1905.

In 1905, Paul Ruez was appointed manager for the venue. Two ballet productions, Les Saisons de la Parisienne and Vers Les Etoiles were created in 1905 and 1906 respectively. Although spectacular, it had only lesser pantomime-ballet influences and received mixed reviews.

In 1908, Victor de Cottens and H. B. Marinelli took over as the directors of the music hall. In 1908, Trianon Ballet, and in 1909, Les Aventures de Mlle Clo-Clo, were ballets about flirting. Choreographed by Curti, Paquita, and L'Enlèvement de Psyché debuted on the London stage in 1909 and 1910, respectively, while Papillon d'Or was first performed at the Empire Theater with music composed by Leopold Wenzel. In 1911, Cottens and H. B. Marinelli left their responsibilities which concluded fourteen ballets staged since the arrival of Ruez. That year, Nitokris was the last pantomime-ballet staged at the Olympia .

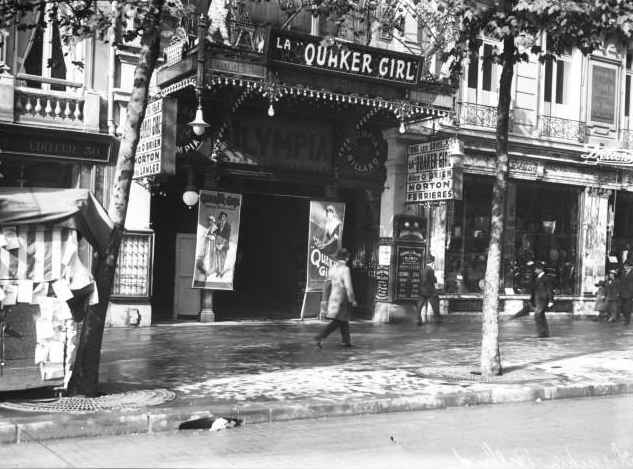
Olympia seen from Boulevard des Capucines in 1913

In 1911, Jacques Charles was trained by both brothers and worked his way up through the Olympia, and became the new executive director, then transformed it into a temple of the revue, entering the "most luxurious period of the place". From 1911 to 1913, three revues included choreographic segments by Léo Staats, which featured dance performances of Natalia Trouhanowa and Stacia Napierkowska. By 1912, the Olympia presented a number of American music hall performers, and also French singers such as Lucienne Boyer, Mistinguett, Damia, Fréhel, Georgius, and Yvonne Printemps. In 1913, a ballet was staged at the Olympia, called Les Franfreluches de L'Amour. Léon Volterra was initially an employee at a car dealership and then joined Charles to began as a programs seller. Volterra negotiated to take charge of the program's sales of Olympia's first dance hall called Le Palais de la Danse, becoming increasingly wealthier.

The Olympia closed its doors for a short period at the beginning of the First World War, while Oller, still the commercial property landlord, struggled financially due to late rent payments and non-payments. Volterra partnered with Olympia chief conductor Raphael Beretta to manage stage shows, giving money to Oller, who "expressly agreed-upon" and Charles' tenant agency, then reopened the music hall one month after the First Battle of the Marne. By then, the revue became the preferred theatrical production choice, and ballet waned in popularity. In 1914, Charles left the Olympia and went to war; he was then wounded on the front lines of the First Battle of Champagne.

In 1915, Volterra and Beretta purchased the Olympia with their financial gains, highlighting chansons with performers such as Boyer, Damia, and Fréhel. The following year, both bought the Casino de Paris and the Folies Bergère. As the bombs dropped from the Zeppelins intensified overnight, Paris shut down its activities, including the Olympia. In 1917, Volterra was fired, leaving the Olympia with a generated personal profit of 1 million de francs. (Note: 1 million of francs in 1917 is equal to US$327,000 in May 2021.)

In 1918, at the end of the war, comedian Paul Franck had been entrusted with the business operation of the music hall and was appointed executive director. In 1922, Olympia's founder Oller died a rich man. Franck revealed new talents, such as Marie Dubas, and brought back on stage artists from the early century that people wished to see again. In 1928, Franck left the music hall, which marked the end of the "golden era".

=== Movie theater ===
By 1929, the music hall had turned into a stagnant concept, while sound film began its ascent in France. Then came the consequences of the global economic and financial crisis of the Great Depression, which forced Olympia into bankruptcy.

Born in Tunisia, Jacques Haïk was the Importer and distributor of Charlie Chaplin's films in France and the inventor of his nickname, "Charlot", in the country. While the crisis steadily deepened in France, Haïk purchased the Olympia and completely transformed the place into a movie theater (cinema).

On 11 April 1930, the venue reopened to the public, under the name "Olympia–Théâtre Jacques Haïk", followed by a screening of Clarence Brown's silent film, The Trail of '98. The theater explored the French cinema of the 1930s, celebrating filmmakers such as Jean Renoir, Maurice Tourneur, and Henry Wulschleger. However, the French Courvoisier bank went bankrupt due to the financial crisis. In 1931, Haïk lost all of his real estate companies but returned to film production, built several theaters starting in 1934, and regained a healthy financial situation over the years. On 6 December 1935, the Olympia Théâtre Jacques Haïk was selected by the Metro-Goldwyn-Mayer during The Great MGM Season—to the detriment of the theater Madeleine—to broadcast a substantial number of film series ending after France's release of Robert Z. Leonard's The Great Ziegfeld in September 1936. Then, MGM moved to Le Paris movie theater on the Champs-Élysées avenue.

Subsequently, the responsibility for the business operation of the Olympia, in its configuration of a movie theater, moved away into a new commercial film company called Gaumont Franco-Film Aubert, then later Pathé, and was finally acquired by entrepreneur Léon Siritzky.

On 9 February 1938, the restyled Olympia movie theater was inaugurated in a gala event with an exclusive screening of La Marseillaise by Renoir.

==== Nazi spoliation ====
In the summer of 1940, the Nazis invaded French towns, villages, and Paris, followed by the plundering of cultural heritage, especially the French of Jewish faith. Being Jewish, Haïk left Paris for North Africa while the Nazis confiscated his property, films and took control of his company Les Films Régent that he had created in 1934. In mid-October 1940, four hundred and seventeen movie theaters were open in Paris, while the seven hundred and thirty-six closed were included in the Aryanization process, along with those of Siritzky. Siritzky, who also controlled the business operations of movie theaters such as the Marivaux, Max Linder César, and Moulin Rouge, received an invitation to tender from Société des cinémas de l'Est (SOGEC), led by German film producer and Continental Films executive director, Alfred Greven. The Société des cinémas de l'Est acquired the totality of Siritzky's business, including the Olympia. Sorbonne's professor Andre Kaspi wrote that Siritzky left France for the United States after the transaction, from which he pocketed 18 millions de francs. (Note: 18 million of francs in 1940 is equal to US$9,697,000 in May 2021.) The Olympia movie theater continued its activity during the occupation of France and broadcast German films by Tobis, Continental Films, as well as French production films by Henri Decoin, Robert Vernay, and Christian-Jaque. The venue also provided shelter for German soldiers.

==== Military requisition ====
In mid-August 1944, at the Liberation of Paris, the American troops requisitioned the Olympia for two years.

In 1945, at the end of the war, Haïk returned to Paris and battled to recuperate his companies, films, and movie theaters still spoliated by Germany.

==== Restitution ====
In January 1946, the Olympia was restituted to him after a judgment by the tribunal de commerce (commercial courts).

On 24 July 1946, it was reopened for public screenings with the Archie Mayo film Crash Dive. Throughout the years, the theater hosted a series of films by Alfred Hitchcock and films from French producers such as Julien Duvivier and Claude Autant-Lara. By 1949, however, Olympia's occupancy rates marked a steady decline, due to the rivalry between Paris' movie theaters and the declining importance of films, despite the success of a few blockbusters, and even under the supervision of the executive administrator Pierre Vercel. Haïk died in 1950.

At that time, Bruno Coquatrix was executive director at Comédie-Caumartin and endured artistic and commercial failures there. He was the impresario of Édith Piaf in the 1940s and was also a songwriter, conductor, and jazz saxophonist. He was also known to be the agent of Léo Marjane and Lucienne Boyer.

In 1952, Coquatrix signed a commercial lease agreement with Jeanne Haïk, owner of the Olympia and director of her late husband's businesses. The Olympia was in a "pitiful state" when Coquatrix took over as a manager and executive director. Nevertheless, he continued using it as a cinema and created operettas there in 1953. However, the downward trend of attendance signaled an impending bankruptcy.

=== Rebirth of the music hall ===
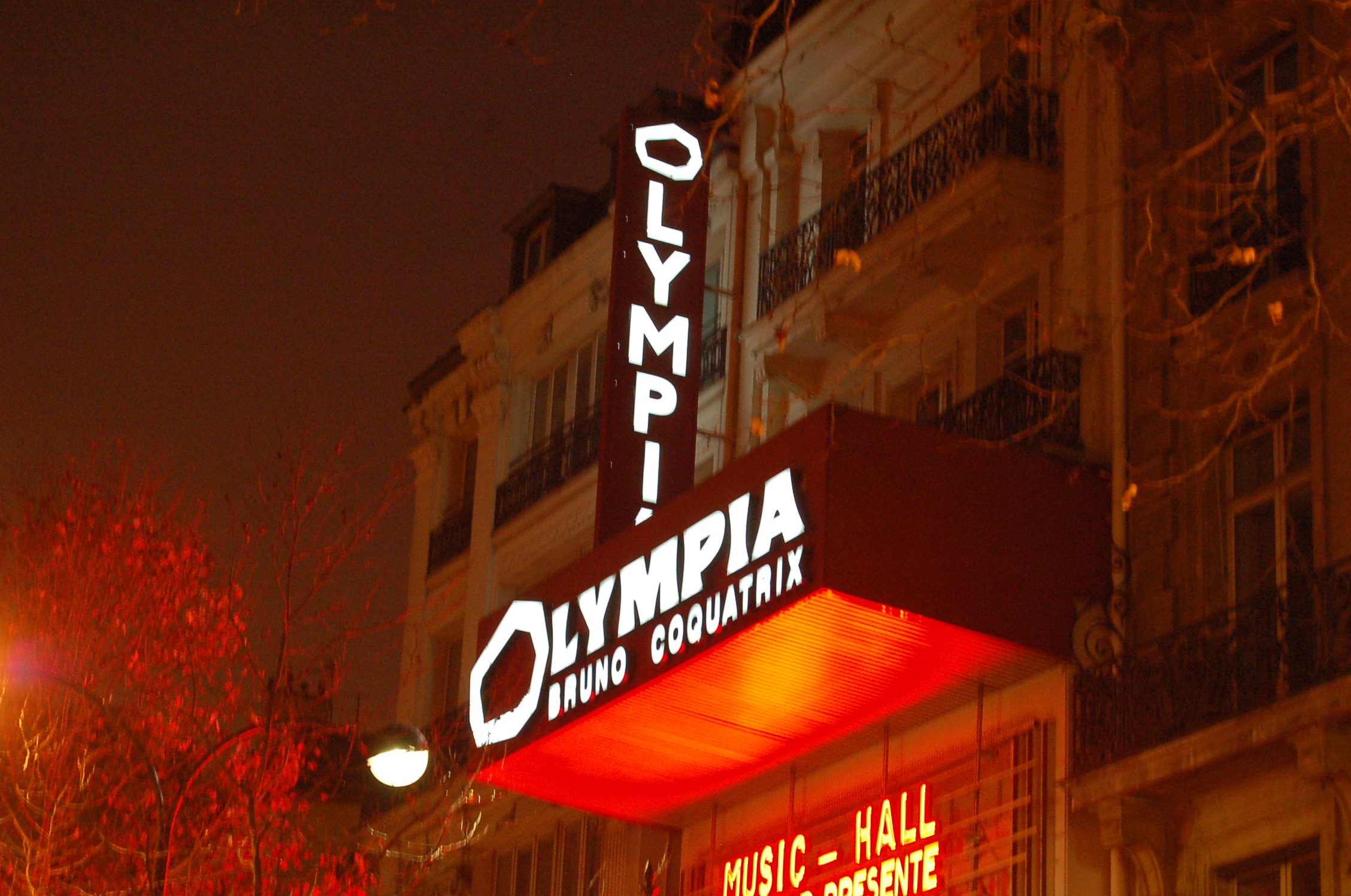
The famous red neon facade

On 5 February 1954, Coquatrix revived it as a 2,000-seat music hall with a grand re-opening organized by Lucienne Delyle and Aimé Barelli, who presented that evening a singer unknown at the time, Gilbert Bécaud, who sang three songs. During the summer of 1954, Coquatrix convinced Jean-Michel Boris, aged twenty-one, to join his new team as a machinist and electrician.

In 1955, renowned jazz musicians as Billie Holiday, Sidney Bechet, Louis Armstrong, and Ella Fitzgerald were received every Wednesday and Saturday at the Olympia. Bécaud returned at the Olympia, where he caused the first scenes of "collective hysteria". By then, the music hall mixed musical genres where tradition and innovation converged. A single music hall show encompassed, attractions, beginner singers, confirmed singers, and highest-ranked entertainers. Coquatrix partnered with Lucien Morisse and Eddie Barclay to hold regular auditions in the original billiard room (emptied of its billiard tables), scrolling through fifteen to fifty unknown artists whose careers "were played out in thirty seconds".

In 1959, Boris was appointed artistic director of the Olympia.

In 1961, the Olympia was close to filing for bankruptcy, but Piaf came to help Coquatrix with the assistance of actor Jacques Tati. The music hall was saved by the performance of Piaf heading the bill for three months in a row—including some offered for free to Coquatrix—accompanied with live shows by Tati provided at the entrance of the venue and on stage.

In 1972, Alan Stivell popularized the style of Celtic music in France by playing at the Olympia, paving the way for Glenmor, Dan Ar Braz, and Tri Yann. The venue also initiated the first steps of Francis Cabrel, Alain Souchon, Paul Anka, and Louis Chedid.

On 1 April 1979, Coquatrix died, and consequently "Olympia–Bruno Coquatrix" became a registered trademark, although he was never the owner of the venue. Following his death, Paulette Coquatrix, and Patricia, their daughter, began to control at equal shares the business operations of the Olympia. That same year, Boris was named executive director of the Olympia.

By 1990, Société Générale took ownership of the building of the Olympia. Subsequently, it went into another slow decline and was in danger of being torn down and turned into a parking lot. Another project was also mentioned to rebuild a scaled-down version of the Olympia after demolition, but Boris, who was at the head of a support committee, went to negotiate with the Société Générale's CEO. In 1991, France's then culture minister, Jack Lang, issued a preservation order for the Olympia to interrupt the pre-established plan of the Société Générale. After that, politician Jacques Toubon had objected to the procedure, which canceled Olympia's protection. A contestation and continued support from French artists and Lang ensued to maintain the building's historic integrity, which led to Olympia's sustainability through a preservation order established on 7 January 1993.

=== Demolition and reconstruction ===
In 1995, as part of the real estate project initiated in 1993, which required 1 milliard of new francs of investment, the Edouard-VII area in the 9th arrondissement, where the Olympia was located, began to undergo "a radical" demolition and reconstruction. (Note: 1 milliard of new francs in 1995 is equal to US$261,800,000 today in May 2021.)

On 14 April 1997, a gala evening was broadcast live on television with reputed French singers, in honor of the Olympia and support of the following months of closure. In Spring 1997, the demolition of the Olympia began. The architecture firms Anthony-Emmanuel Bechu, and Fernando Urquijo–Gino Valle–Giorgio Macola were appointed to manage the reconstruction project. It was rebuilt identically in seven months, keeping its original facade and the grandeur of its famous red interior, as well as the bar and the mosaics. The Olympia was relocated eight meters beneath its previous location. Nevertheless, the entrance to the venue remained in the same place, leading to the hall, which has retained its same seating capacity. The venue's original acoustic was studied and preserved, as its aesthetics including its midnight blue ceiling and black walls. The cost of demolition, reconstruction and renovation of the Olympia was 100 millions of new francs. (Note: 100 millions of new francs in 1997 is equal to US$25,000,000 today in May 2021.)

On 30 April 1999, the real estate subsidiary of the Société Générale at the origin of the project, delivered the large commercial properties (including the Théâtre Édouard VII) to its buyer, the Société Foncière Lyonnaise, a subsidiary of Commercial Union, for an amount of 2,15 milliards of new francs. (Note: 2,15 milliards of new francs in 1999 is equal to US$541,000,000 in May 2021.) As a result, the Société Foncière Lyonnaise became the owner of the Olympia's building. The vast real estate transaction "almost signed the death warrant of the Olympia".

On 17 July 2001, Boris retired as artistic director of the music hall.

In August 2001, Paulette and Patrica Coquatrix sold the brand "Olympia" to Vivendi's chief executive Jean-Marie Messier. With the tensions tearing the heirs apart, Messier also bought the fonds de commerce (goodwill and stock in trade and intangible assets) from its owner, the Société Générale, as well as the percentage from Paulette Coquatrix and her daughter (both were fonds de commerce's tenants). Messier was the sole initiator of the "astronomical amount" of money that transited, which sparked an investigation by the Fisc. At this point, the Société Foncière Lyonnaise retained ownership of the building, but negotiations continued during August, as Vivendi attempted to acquire it. By October 2001, the buyout was completed. Vivendi Universal Entertainment bought the building, corresponding to the remaining twenty percent. Since then, the business unit Vivendi Village has been the sole owner and supervise the commercial operations of the Olympia.

In 2002, Arnaud Delbarre was named as executive director of the Olympia by Universal Music France's Président-directeur général, Pascal Nègre.

In 2008, the Olympia was cited as "one of the world's four or five most modern performance halls."

In late June 2015, Delbarre, aged fifty-seven years, resigned from office, concluding with an activity of three hundred shows per year at the Olympia, comparatively to two hundred when he arrived in 2002. By 2015, the venue, which was considered profitable, drew 700,000 attendees per year.

In 2016, Simon Gillham, chairman of Vivendi Village, became president of the Olympia. On 30 November 2016, Olympia was used for movie projection again, with the premiere of the biopic Dalida. The screening was significant in France and was broadcast live in 220 other venues from the country and Belgium.

== Renovations ==
=== 1930 ===
Haïk engaged three architects for a significant renovation and remodeling of the music hall into a movie theater. Paul Farge was responsible for coordinating and monitoring works, while Gabriel Morice supervised the work of the structural system within the building. In coordination with Farge, Jean-Paul Mongeaud was responsible for designing and constructing the new neon lights facade displayed twelve meters high and eight meters wide. The neon tubes whose curves were drawn by Mongeaud were elaborated and created by engineer Fonsèque from Paz and Silva company. The two neon side panels, integrating over the facade's entire height, were also created by Paz and Silva. The facade, illuminated in red, blue, and green encompassing four hundred meters of neon tubes, was the most significant illuminated sign in Europe and a reference for that time. A blacksmith artisan created the ornamental steel structure of the facade. Pelegry and Lavignac, responsible for the interior decorations of the Plaza Athénée and Théâtre des Folies-Wagram, designed the ceilings and wall decorations in accordance with Farge. The theater featured quality acoustic, indirect lighting, and Gallay brand velvet armchairs mingling dark green and light green. A Cavaillé-Coll organ was placed there. The Olympia–Théâtre Jacques Haïk was equipped with a modern sound installation for that time, which Western Electric installed, and the air conditioning was assigned to Willis Carrier.

=== 1938 ===
Siritzky undertook a renovation to highlight the facade of the Olympia as a movie theater. Architects Fernand Colin, Ruillier, and Vladimir Scob, decided to demolish the facade from the ground floor level to the second floor on a height of twelve meters, then fitted the roof with a massive steel fairing inspired by the bow of a ship and the exterior entrance was redesigned. The facade was adorned with one thousand five hundred meters of neon lights and fifteen thousand lamps using two thousand amperes. The theater was described as "sumptuous" with "modern-harmonious lines" benefiting from intense electric lighting.

=== 1954 ===
Coquatrix had decided to have the exterior facade of the venue redone, thus making it possible to announce the names of the artists in capital letters updated every day below the signage of the Olympia. The lettering "Olympia" and the artists' names illuminated in red neon lighting, were designed according to the taste of Coquatrix. The octagon shape of the "O" was inspired by the aerial view of the Paris' ring road.

=== 1956 ===
The interior layout was envisioned by Henri Rigal, also responsible for the decoration of Le Lido. Then later, only the armchairs have been regularly replaced throughout the years.

=== 2019 ===
In 2019, the Olympia opened to the public the authentic original billiard room, which served as an audition area under the direction of Coquatrix. Classified as Monument historique, the billiard room in Teal blue of 130 m^{2} (1399 ft^{2}) has been preserved and renovated, keeping its ceramics and mural panels depicting British landscapes such as Falls of Clyde, Warwick Castle, Tower of London, adorned with carved woodwork. In the early years of the Olympia, the billiard room was one of Edward VII's preferred places in Paris.

== Notable performances ==
In 1900, the quick-change artist Fregoli would have remained at the top of the bill for seven months.

Édith Piaf achieved great acclaim at the Olympia giving several series of recitals from January 1955 until October 1962. At the end of her life and in poor health, Piaf made two performances per evening for three months.

Dalida was the most commercially successful solo performer at the Olympia. Her first performance in the hall was in early 1956 at auditions held by Eddie Barclay and Bruno Coquatrix. It was then when she was discovered and chosen to sign a contract. Later that year she supported Charles Aznavour for his concert. Her own first concert there was in 1959. After that she would perform in Olympia every three to four years, singing for 30 nights in row, completely sold-out in 1961, 1964, 1967, 1971, 1974, 1977, 1981. Her last Olympia appearance was in 1981, and in 1983 the hall went bankrupt. Releasing Olympia 67 after her 1967 Olympia concert, she started releasing albums named for Olympia concerts, a style followed by other singers. She continued doing that until her last concert in Olympia, Olympia 81. Olympia 71, Olympia 74, and Olympia 77 are live albums.

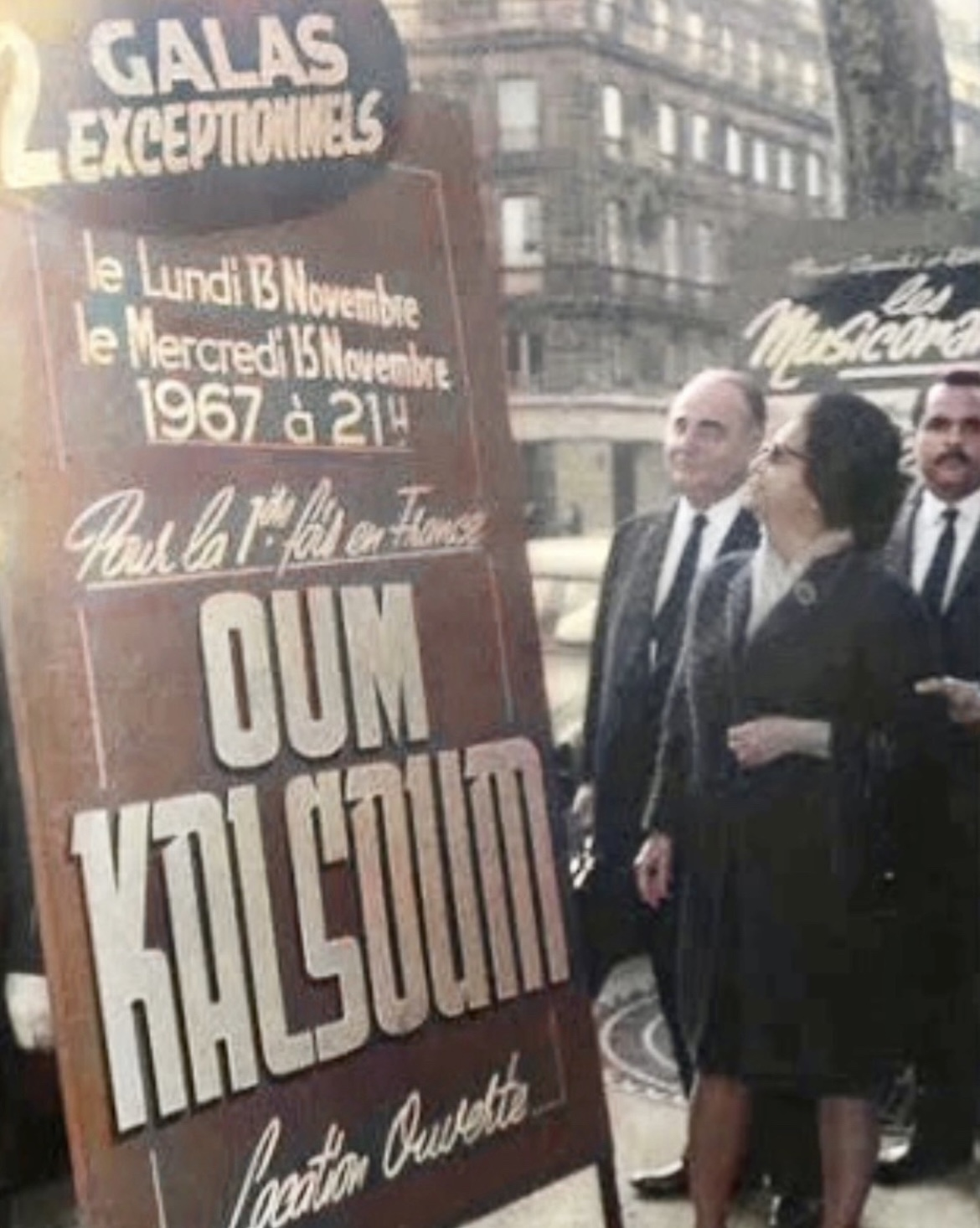
Umm Kulthum checking a banner for her concert in Olympia, 12 November 1967

Jacques Brel's 1961 and 1964 concerts at L'Olympia are legendary and preserved to this day on new CD releases. In October 1966, Brel gave a series of farewell concerts from the Olympia stage. A 1962 Marlene Dietrich concert was also broadcast from the Olympia.

Before going to America, the Beatles performed eighteen days (16 January – 4 February 1964) of concerts at the Olympia Theatre, playing two and sometimes three shows a day. They were staying at the Hotel George V and after returning at the end of their first day, they were told that "I Want to Hold Your Hand" had reached number one in America.

In 1967, Egyptian singer Umm Kulthum performed a five-hour Olympia show.

In December 1970, Tabu Ley Rochereau became the first sub-Saharan African artist to headline a two-day Olympia show. After positive reception from the audience, the contract was enlarged with 14 supplementary shows.

On 3–4 May 1972 the Grateful Dead played two concerts here as part of their first major European tour. Both shows were recorded and songs from each were released on their 1972 live album Europe '72. In May 1975, Fripp & Eno performed one of their rare instrumental loop sets at the Olympia, with tape recordings of the event being released thirty-six years later as 28 May 1975 Olympia Paris, France.

In 3-4 May 1979 Lebanese singer Fairuz held a concert at the Olympia, where she sang many of her notable songs. The concert was also launched as a live album.

Julio Iglesias was on the stage in 1981 for his album De Niña a Mujer when a horde of woman fans came on the stage to get his autograph and trampled him onto the floor.

Jeff Buckley, long an admirer of Piaf, gave what he considered the finest performance of his career there in 1995, which was later released in 2001 on Live at L'Olympia.

Dave Gahan's performance was released on the 2004 DVD, Live Monsters.

Mireille Mathieu, the famous French chanteuse who is considered to be "the heir to Édith Piaf", held a considerable amount of concerts in the Olympia over the years, starting in 1965 as the opening for a show held by Sacha Distel and Dionne Warwick. She held a performance in December 1967. In 1968, a live album would be released – Mireille Mathieu en direct de l'Olympia. She would go on to perform at the Olympia in December 1969, January 1970, February and March 1973, 1998, 2002 and 2005. She celebrated her 40th and 50th anniversaires at the Olympia. For the 40th anniversary, she released a CD and DVD of the live performance.
