= On the Road (1936 film) =

1936 film

- Directed by: Jean Boyer
- Written by: Jean Boyer
- Produced by: Peter Paul Brauer; Raoul Ploquin
- Starring: Jacques Pills; Claude May; Georges Tabet
- Music by: Georges Van Parys
- Production company: L'Alliance Cinématographique Européenne (ACE)
- Distributed by: L'Alliance Cinématographique Européenne (ACE)
- Release date: 8 December 1936
- Running time: 87 minutes
- Country: France
- Language: French

On the Road or Take the Road (French: Prends la route) is a 1936 French musical comedy film directed by Jean Boyer and starring Jacques Pills, Claude May, and Georges Tabet. The same lead actors had also appeared together in You Are Me.

It was produced by the French subsidiary of the German company UFA.

== Main cast ==
- Jacques Pills as Jacques
- Claude May as Simone
- Georges Tabet as Potopoto, le motocycliste et agent d'assurance
- André Alerme as Dupont-Dernier, l'indistriel
- Marcel Simon as le comte
- Lucien Callamand as le gendarme
- Colette Darfeuil as Wanda, l'aventurière
- Monette Dinay as la secrétaire de Potopoto
- Jeanne Loury as Tante Guiguitte

== Bibliography ==
- Dayna Oscherwitz & MaryEllen Higgins. The A to Z of French Cinema. Scarecrow Press, 2009.
