= You Are Me =

1936 film

- Directed by: René Guissart
- Written by: Henri Duvernois (libretto)
- Produced by: Fred Bacos
- Starring: Jacques Pills; Claude May; Georges Tabet
- Cinematography: Charles Bauer
- Edited by: Maurice Serein
- Music by: Moïse Simons
- Production company: Paris Ciné Films
- Release date: 4 December 1936
- Running time: 83 minutes
- Country: France
- Language: French

You Are Me (French: Toi, c'est moi) is a 1936 French musical comedy film directed by René Guissart and starring Jacques Pills, Georges Tabet, and Claude May. It is an operetta film based on a stage work of the same title. Pills and Tabet were paired in another film On the Road, released the same year.

The film's sets were designed by the art director René Renoux.

== Cast ==
- Jacques Pills as Bobby Guibert - un fêtard impénitent, l'ami inséparable de Pat
- Georges Tabet as Patrice 'Pat' Duvallon - un fêtard impénitent, l'ami inséparable de Bobby
- André Berley as Pedro Hernandez
- Claude May as Maricousa Hernandez
- Louis Baron fils as Pfutz - le secrétaire
- Junie Astor as Viviane Robinet
- Pauline Carton as Honorine Guibert - la tante de Bobby
- Saturnin Fabre as Adolphe Robinet - le résident
- Paul Hams as Cicéron
- Anaclara as Bédélia
- Lucette Desmoulins
- Odette Barencey
- Claude Marty
- Liliane Lesaffre

== Bibliography ==
- Dayna Oscherwitz & MaryEllen Higgins. The A to Z of French Cinema. Scarecrow Press, 2009.
