= Il neige sur Liège =

Jacques Brel song

"Il Neige sur Liège" (It snows on Liège) is a 1963 song written and performed by Jacques Brel.

== Lyrics ==
The melancholic song describes how snow is falling on Liège, while the protagonist in the song observes the effect the weather has on the people in the city, "while the Meuse river pierces through the city." As the snow falls on Liège the singer wonders "or is it Liège snowing on the sky?" Eventually he concludes that it "snows on Liège and on his dreams, while the river pierces through the city."

== Cover versions ==
"Il neige sur Liège" was covered in French by Danièle Pascale, Vadim Piankov and also by Anne Peko. The song was covered in Afrikaans by Herman van den Berg and in Dutch by Douwe Heeringa & Compagnie. Rod McKuen covered it in English as "To You".
