= Olympia 1961 =

Live album by Jacques Brel
- Released: 1962
- Recorded: 27–29 October 1961
- Genre: Chanson
- Length: 48:13
- Label: Philips (original album); Barclay/Universal

Jacques Brel chronology
Olympia 1961 (1962)	Olympia 1964 (1964)

Olympia 1961 (Philips 6416 403) is Jacques Brel's first live album. The album was reissued on 23 September 2003 under the title Enregistrement Public à l'Olympia 1961 as part of the 16-CD box set Boîte à bonbons by Barclay (980 816-8).

== Track listing ==
All tracks composed by Jacques Brel, except where noted.

1. "Les prénoms de Paris" (Brel, Gérard Jouannest)
2. "Les bourgeois" (Brel, Jean Corti)
3. "Les paumés du petit matin" (Brel, François Rauber)
4. "Les Flamandes"
5. "La statue" (Brel, Rauber)
6. "Zangra"
7. "Marieke" (Brel, Jouannest)
8. "Les biches" (Brel, Jouannest)
9. "Madeleine" (Brel, Jouannest, Corti)
10. "Les singes"
11. "L’Ivrogne" (Brel, Jouannest, Rauber)
12. "La valse à mille temps"
13. "Ne me quitte pas"
14. "Le Moribond"
15. "Quand on n'a que l'amour"

== Credits ==
- Gérard Jouannest – piano
- François Rauber – piano
- Jean Corti – accordion
- Daniel Janin – orchestra conductor
