= Olympia 1964 =

Enregistrement Public à l'Olympia 1964

Live album by Jacques Brel
- Released: 21 October 1964
- Recorded: 16–17 October 1964
- Venue: Olympia Hall
- Genre: Chanson
- Length: 28:19 (LP); 48:12 (CD)
- Language: French
- Label: Barclay/Universal
- Producer: Jean-Marie Guérin

Jacques Brel chronology
| Enregistrement Public à l'Olympia 1961 (1962) | Enregistrement Public à l'Olympia 1964 (1964) |

Enregistrement Public à l'Olympia 1964 is Jacques Brel's second live album. The original 25 cm LP version only contained track 1-8. Also known as Olympia 64, the album was reissued with a total of 15 chansons in 1988 as part of CD Box "Integrale", and on 23 September 2003 under the title Enregistrement Public à l'Olympia 1964 as part of the 16-CD box set Boîte à bonbons by Barclay (980 817-1). The album was included in Robert Dimery's 1001 Albums You Must Hear Before You Die.

On the double CD "Olympia 1964-1966" issued in 2016 (Barclay no. 4774913), a different track sequence is provided, "more closely resembling the original sequence as performed by Brel", with "Amsterdam" as third chanson.

== Track listing ==
All tracks composed by Jacques Brel, except where noted.

1. "Amsterdam"
2. "Les Timides"
3. "Le Dernier Repas"
4. "Les Jardins du casino" (Brel, Gérard Jouannest)
5. "Les Vieux" (Brel, Jouannest)
6. "Les Toros" (Brel, Jouannest)
7. "Tango funèbre" (Brel, Jouannest)
8. "Le Plat Pays"
  Bonus tracks on the reissues on CD in 1988, 2003 and 2013:
9. "Les Bonbons" (Brel, Jouannest)
10. "Mathilde"
11. "Les Bigotes" (Brel, Jean Corti)
12. "Les Bourgeois"
13. "Jef"
14. "Au suivant" (Brel, Jouannest, Corti)
15. "Madeleine"

== Credits ==
- Gérard Jouannest - ensemble leader
- François Rauber - orchestra conductor
