= Bruno Coquatrix =

French music producer

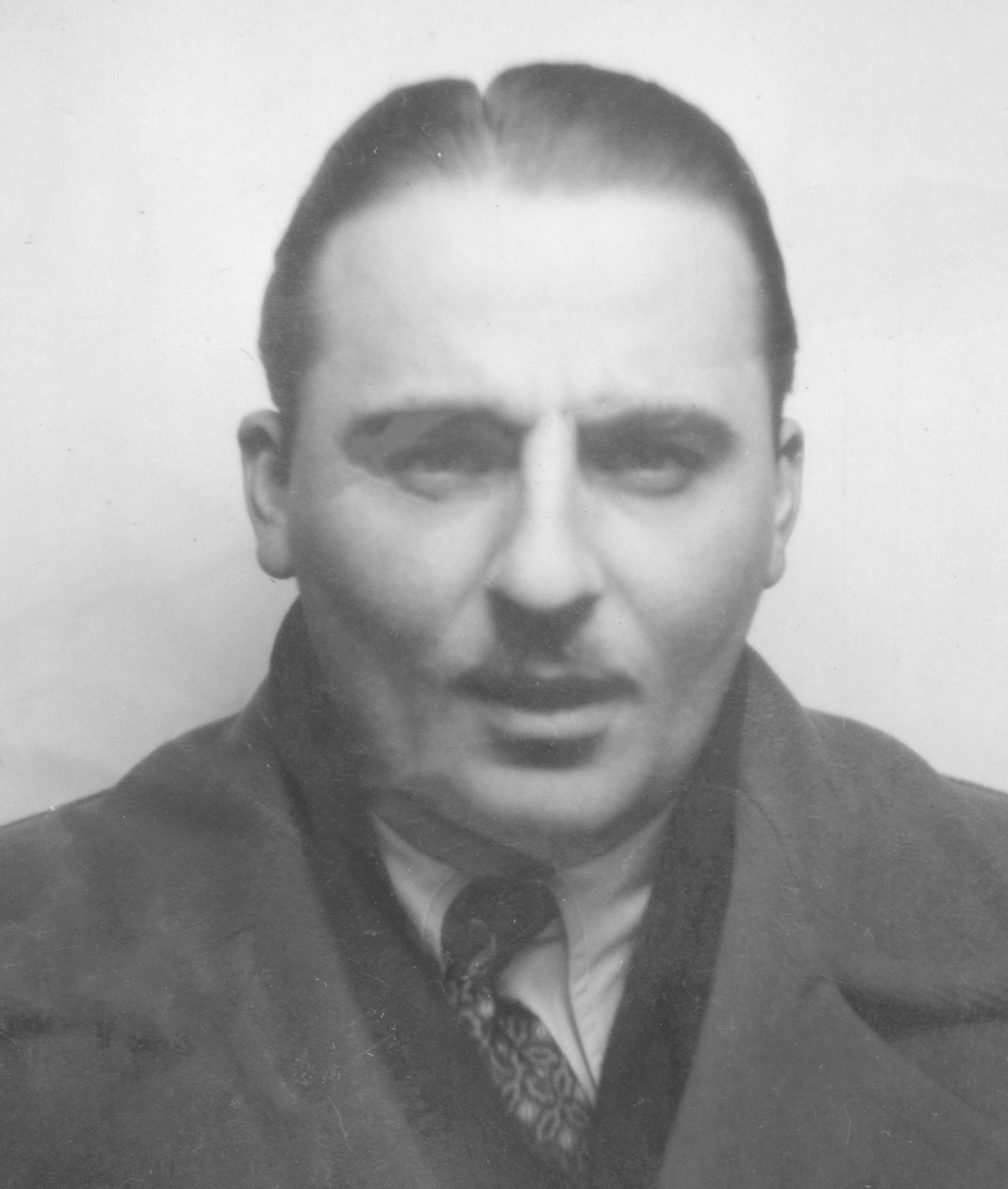
Coquatrix in 1940

Bruno Coquatrix (French pronunciation: [bʁyno kɔkatʁi]; 5 August 1910, Ronchin, Nord – 1 April 1979) was a French record producer, the owner and manager of Olympia in Paris from 1954 until his death in 1979.

== Career ==
Coquatrix was first known as a song and music writer. He wrote over 300 songs, including Mon ange (1940); Dans un coin de mon pays (1940); Clopin-clopant (1947); Cheveux dans le vent (1949), as well as some operettas. He was also an impresario, representing Jacques Pills and Lucienne Boyer, among others.

He managed the variety theatre Bobino before he took over the Olympia Hall, Europe's biggest music hall in 1954. In 1956, during a "tomorrow's number 1" audition at the Olympia, Coquatrix, Lucien Morrisse and Eddie Barclay discovered the unknown cabaret singer Dalida. He then staged all the era's celebrities, including Georges Brassens, Jacques Brel, Gilbert Bécaud, Ewa Demarczyk, Johnny Hallyday, Violetta Villas, Umm Kulthum, Édith Piaf, Annie Cordy, Charles Aznavour, Mireille Mathieu and Yves Montand.

Bruno Coquatrix co-founded a record company, the Disques Versailles.

Bruno Coquatrix was the director of the casino of Cabourg (Calvados) in the 1950s, and the mayor of Cabourg from 1971 until his death in 1979. His mandate as Mayor of Cabourg was focused on the development of tourism and real estate, and the growth of Cabourg's sister cities (+11 during his mandate).

== Personal life ==
Coquatrix was married to Paulette Coquatrix.

He was the best man of Henri Betti in 1949 and André Hornez in 1963 who were the authors of C'est si bon. Coquatrix was buried in the Père Lachaise Cemetery (division 96). In November 2010, the newly named street "Rue Bruno Coquatrix" was inaugurated in Paris next to the Olympia Hall. In Calbourg where he was Mayor, the downtown square, "Place Bruno Coquatrix", was named after him, and a "Bruno Coquatrix Stèle" stands in the middle of the square.

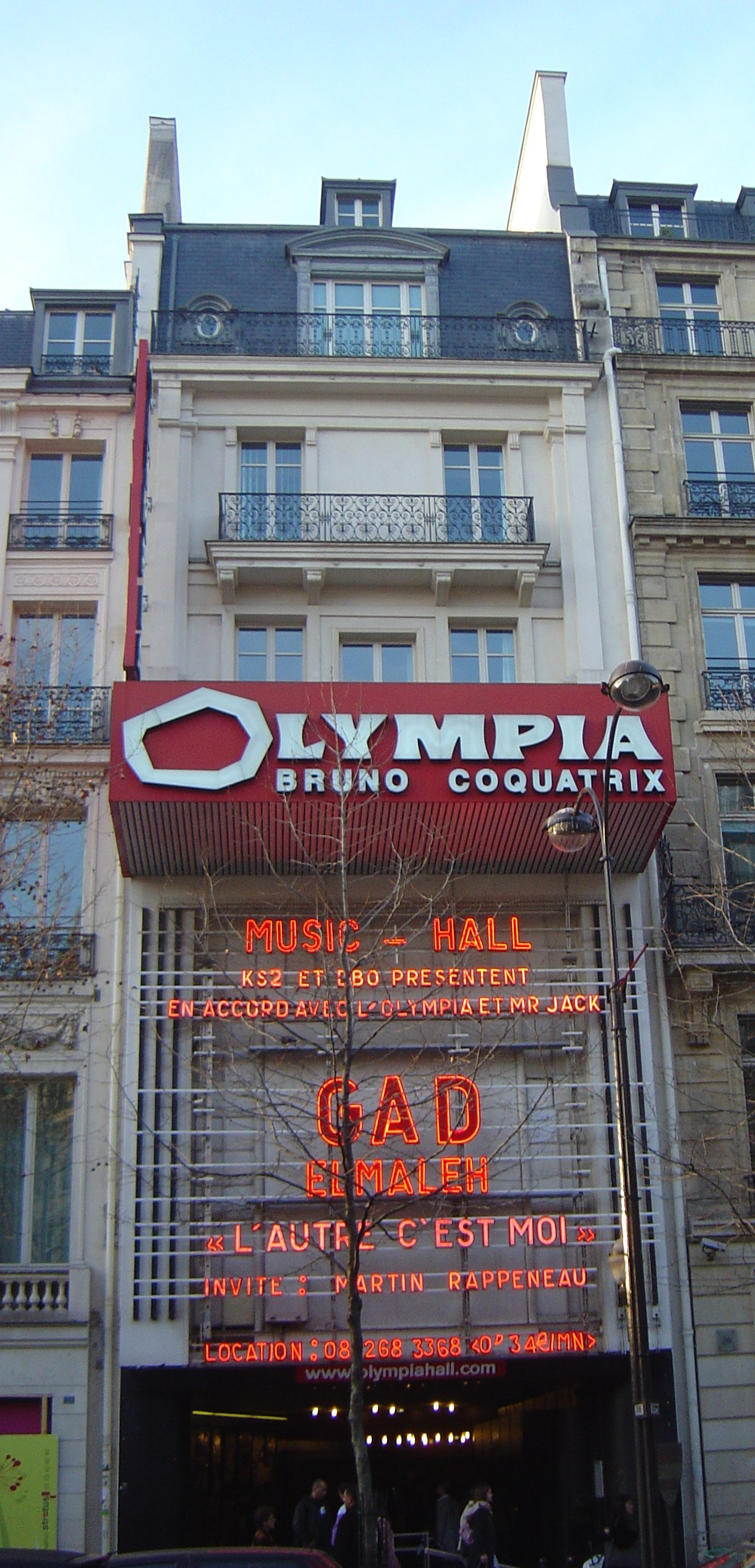
Olympia's facade with "Bruno Coquatrix" in the official name, 2005.

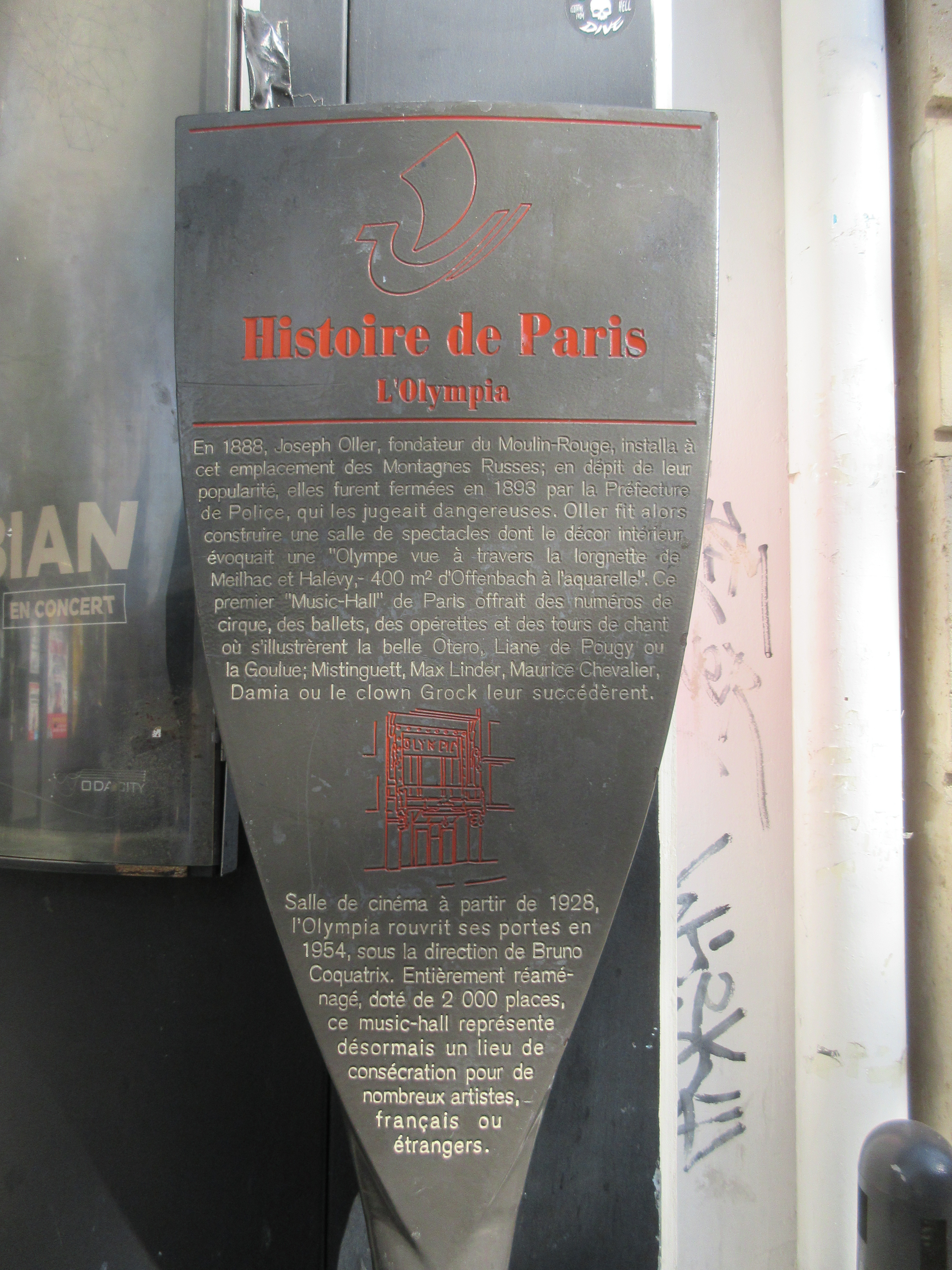
Paris' Landmark sign mentioning Coquatrix in the history of the Olympia Hall.

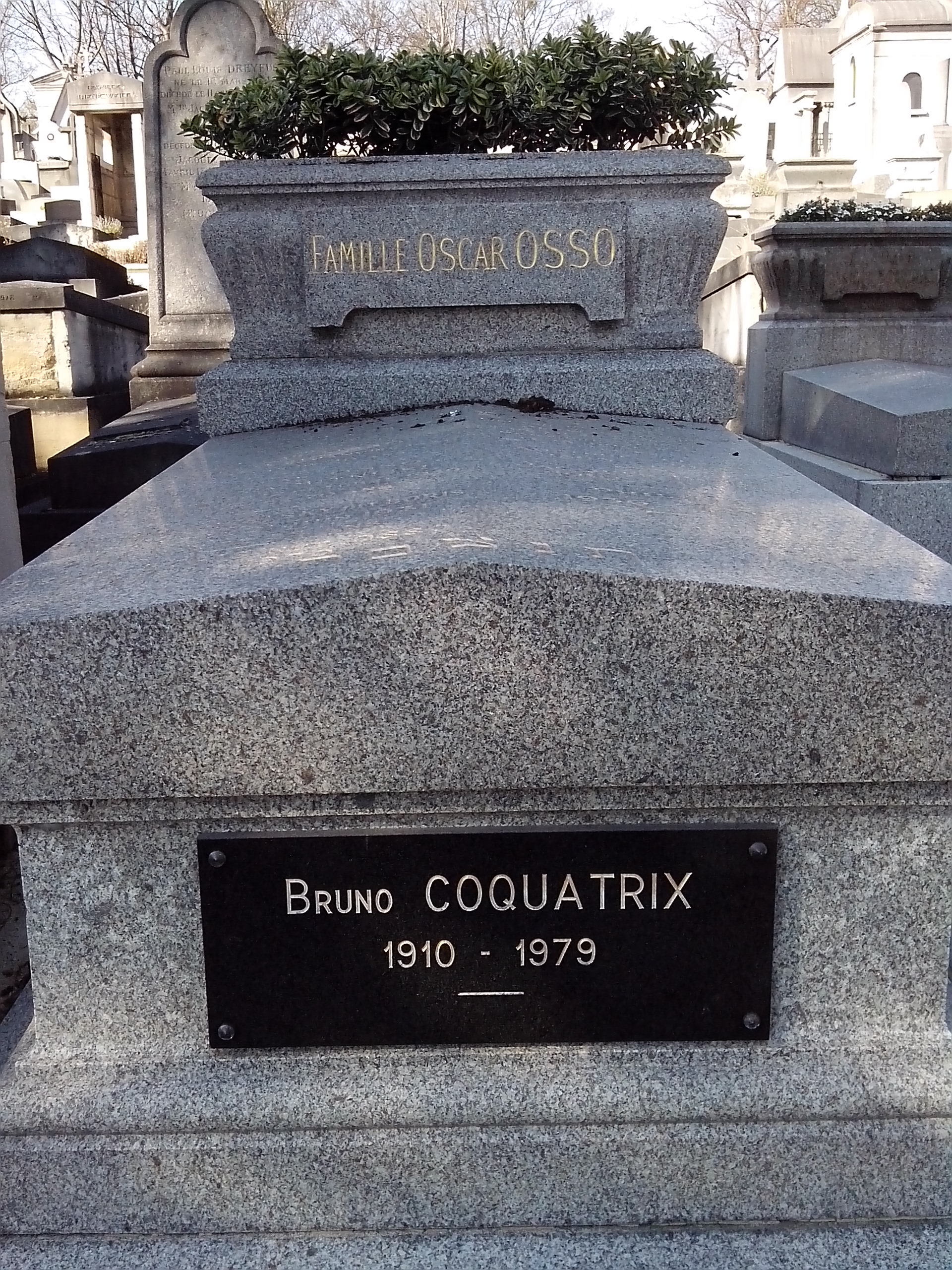
Tomb of Bruno Coquatrix, Père Lachaise Cemetery.

== Honors and awards ==
- Chevalier of the Order of Legion of Honnour
- Chevalier of the Ordre des Palmes Académiques
- Chevalier of the Ordre du Mérite social
- Chevalier of the Order of Cultural Merit (Monaco)

== See also ==
- Olympia Hall
- Paulette Coquatrix

== Bibliography ==
- Paulette Coquatrix. Les coulisses de ma mémoire (1984) Grasset & Fasquelle; ISBN 2-246-31071-7
- Jean-Michel Boris. Olympia, Bruno Coquatrix (2003) Hors Collection; ISBN 2-258-06234-9
