= Mony =

Mony may refer to:

== People ==
- Pierre Mony (1896–1980), French international footballer
- Olivier Mony (born 1966), French writer and journalist
- Sivaram Mony (born 1991), Indian feature film director and editor
- Stéphane Mony (1800–1884), French engineer, businessman and politician.
- Mony Marc, Belgian singer
- D. Moni, Indian Marxist politician

== Other ==
- MONY (Mutual of New York), an insurance company, now a subsidiary of AXA.
- MONY Arizona Classic, a former golf tournament
- Mony Mony, a 1968 single by American pop rock band Tommy James and the Shondells
- MONY Syracuse Senior Classic, a former golf tournament
