= Frédéric Brun =

Frédéric Brun may refer to:

- Frédéric Brun (cyclist, born 1957) (1957–2025), French cyclist
- Frédéric Brun (cyclist, born 1988), French cyclist
- Frédéric Brun (writer) (born 1960), French writer
- Frédéric Brun, co-founder of French music technology company Arturia
