= Prix Françoise Sagan =

The prix Françoise Sagan is a French literary award established in 2010 by Denis Westhoff, the son of Françoise Sagan.

== The Prize ==
Awarded at the beginning of June, the Prix Françoise Sagan rewards "an author never yet rewarded, not even selected in recent months. It distinguishes a work in French and is meant to be innovative and focused on a work in progress "thus privileging" a revelation to a talent already confirmed." The selection of the titles in competition is established by the jurors, each proposing one or Two books that can compete.

== Jurys ==
The jury of the prize, chaired by Denis Westhoff for the first edition, is composed in a moving way according to the years. In addition, the winner automatically joins the jury of the following year and becomes its president.

- 2010: Patrick Besson, Michel Déon, Jérôme Garcin, Annick Geille, François Gibault, Olivia de Lamberterie, Justine Lévy, Françoise-Marie Santucci, Delphine de Vigan, Florian Zeller and Denis Westhoff (with Frédéric Mitterrand, ministre de la Culture et de la Communication, as member of honour).
- 2011: Adélaïde de Clermont-Tonnerre (laureate 2010), Guillaume Durand, Jean-Louis Ezine, Olivia de Lamberterie, Jean-Claude Lamy, Macha Makeieff, Patrick Poivre d'Arvor, Yves Simon, Delphine de Vigan, Caroline Wassermann and Denis Westhoff.
- 2012: François Angelier, Arnaud Cathrine, Fabienne Berthaud (laureate 2011), Adélaïde de Clermont-Tonnerre, Kathleen Evin, Xavier Houssin, Olivia de Lamberterie, Philippe Lefait, Véronique Ovaldé, Delphine Peras and Denis Westhoff.
- 2013: Alexandre Fillon, David Foenkinos, Célia Houdart (laureate 2012), Olivier Mony, Anne Plantagenet, Colombe Schneck, Amanda Sthers, Augustin Trapenard.
- 2014:
  - permanent members: Adélaïde de Clermont-Tonnerre, Olivia de Lamberterie, Denis Westhoff
  - Jury 2014: Annabelle Mouloudji, Bernard Lehut, Hélène Gaultier, Olivier Bouillère (laureate 2013), Philippe Delaroche, Simonetta Greggio, Éric Naulleau, Arielle Dombasle, Marianne Payot
- 2015:
  - permanent members: Adélaïde de Clermont-Tonnerre, Olivia de Lamberterie, Denis Westhoff
  - Jury 2015: Virginie Carton, Blandine de Caunes, Céline Hromadova, Stéphanie des Horts, Valérie Gans, Julia Kerninon (laureate 2014), Patricia Martin, Karine Tuil, Frédéric Brun, Benoît Graffin, Frank Maubert.
- 2016:
  - permanent members: Adélaïde de Clermont-Tonnerre, Olivia de Lamberterie, Denis Westhoff
  - Jury 2016: Vincent Almendros (laureate 2015), Danielle Cillien-Sabatier, Loïc Ducroquet, Émilie Frèche, Mathieu Garrigou-Lagrange, Arnaud Le Guern, Louise Mailloux, Valérie Mirarchi

== Laureates ==
- 2010: Fourrure by Adélaïde de Clermont-Tonnerre (Stock)
- 2011: Un jardin sur le ventre by Fabienne Berthaud (JBZ et Cie)
- 2012: Carrare by Célia Houdart (Éditions P.O.L)
- 2013: Le Poivre by Olivier Bouillère (P.O.L)
- 2014: Buvard by Julia Kerninon (Éditions du Rouergue)
- 2015: Un été by Vincent Almendros (Les Éditions de Minuit)
- 2016: Un beau début by Éric Laurrent (Les Éditions de Minuit)
- 2017: Fils du feu by Guy Boley (Grasset)
- 2018: Fugitive parce que reine by Violaine Huisman (Gallimard)
- 2019: Le sort tomba sur le plus jeune by Sophie Blandinières (Flammarion)
- 2020: La dissonante by Clément Rossi (Gallimard)
