= Les Marquises =

Studio album by Jacques Brel
- Released: 17 November 1977
- Recorded: 5 September – 1 October 1977; Studio Hoche, Paris
- Genre: Chanson
- Length: 66 minutes
- Label: Barclay/Universal

Jacques Brel chronology
Ne me quitte pas (1972)	Les Marquises (1977)

Professional ratings
Review scores
Source	Rating
Allmusic	4/5 stars

Les Marquises (English: The Marquesas) is Jacques Brel's fourteenth and final album. Also known as Brel, the album was released 17 November 1977 by Barclay (96 010). This was the singer's first album of new songs in ten years and was released a year before his death from lung cancer. The album's themes include death ("Jaurès", "Vieillir", "Jojo"), parting ("Orly") and in several songs Brel evokes his career in the 1960s ("Les F..", "Jojo", "Knokke-le-Zoute Tango", "Vieillir"). The album was recorded live in Studio B at the Barclay Studios on Avenue Hoche, Paris. With his health failing, Brel was only able to record at most two songs per day. Brel returned to the Marquesas Islands shortly after the recording sessions.

The album was treated with great secrecy before its release and was delivered to reviewers in a reinforced metal box with a timed, electronic padlock to stop them listening to it before its release date. No airplay of the album was allowed and no singles were released until after its release, and there were no interviews or promotion given by Brel regarding the album. Despite this, the album reached number one in France and earned Brel a gold record for selling 100,000 albums in 1978 and went platinum in 1981.

The album was reissued on 23 September 2003 under the title Les Marquises as part of the 16-CD box set Boîte à bonbons by Barclay (980 817–7).

== Track listing ==
Track	Title	Translation	Composer	Recorded
1	"Jaurès"	Jaurès	Jacques Brel	1977-09-24
2	"La ville s’endormait"	The city was falling asleep	Jacques Brel	1977-09-08
3	"Vieillir"	Ageing	Jacques Brel, Gérard Jouannest	1977-09-29
4	"Le Bon Dieu"	The good Lord	Jacques Brel	1977-09-23
5	"Les F..."	The F...	Jacques Brel, Joe Donato	1977-09-22
6	"Orly"	Orly	Jacques Brel	1977-09-05
7	"Les Remparts de Varsovie"	The ramparts of Warsaw	Jacques Brel	1977-09-23
8	"Voir un ami pleurer"	Seeing a friend cry	Jacques Brel	1977-09-21
9	"Knokke-le-Zoute Tango"	Knokke-le-Zoute Tango	Jacques Brel	1977-09-27
10	"Jojo"	Jojo	Jacques Brel	1977-09-05
11	"Le Lion"	The lion	Jacques Brel	1977-09-24
12	"Les Marquises"	The Marquesas	Jacques Brel	1977-10-01
13	"Sans exigences"	Without demands	Jacques Brel, François Rauber	1977-09-24
14	"Avec élégance"	With elegance	Jacques Brel, François Rauber	1977-09-24
15	"Mai 40"	May 40	Jacques Brel	1977-09-24
16	"L'amour est mort"	Love is dead	Jacques Brel, Gérard Jouannest	1977-09-24
17	"La Cathédrale"	The cathedral	Jacques Brel	1977-09-24

- Tracks 1–12 constituted the original 1977 release of the album.
- Tracks 13–17 were recorded during the same sessions but Brel felt they were unfinished and asked his producer Barclay to not release them, they were added later to the album when it was reissued as part of the 16-CD box set Boîte à bonbons.
- "Les F..." adapted from "The Frog" excerpt from João Donato A Bad Donato (1970).

== Personnel ==
- Jacques Brel – composer, vocals
- François Rauber – orchestra conductor, arrangements, liner notes
- François Rauber et Son Orchestre - orchestra
- Gérard Jouannest – piano, liner notes
- Marcel Azzola – accordion
- Madly Bamy - voice on "Le lion" (uncredited)
- Sylvain Taillet – producer
- Gerhardt Lehner – recording engineer & audio mixing
- Jean-Pierre Michau - recording assistant
- Laurent Guéneau – audio mixing (tracks 13–17)
- Jean-Marie Guérin – mastering
- Jean-Michel Deligny – photography (inner)
- Alain Marouani – photography

== Certifications ==
Region	Certification	Certified units/sales
Belgium	—	100,000
France (SNEP)	Platinum	1,000,000
