= Jean-Jacques Gabut =

French writer and journalist (1934–2024)

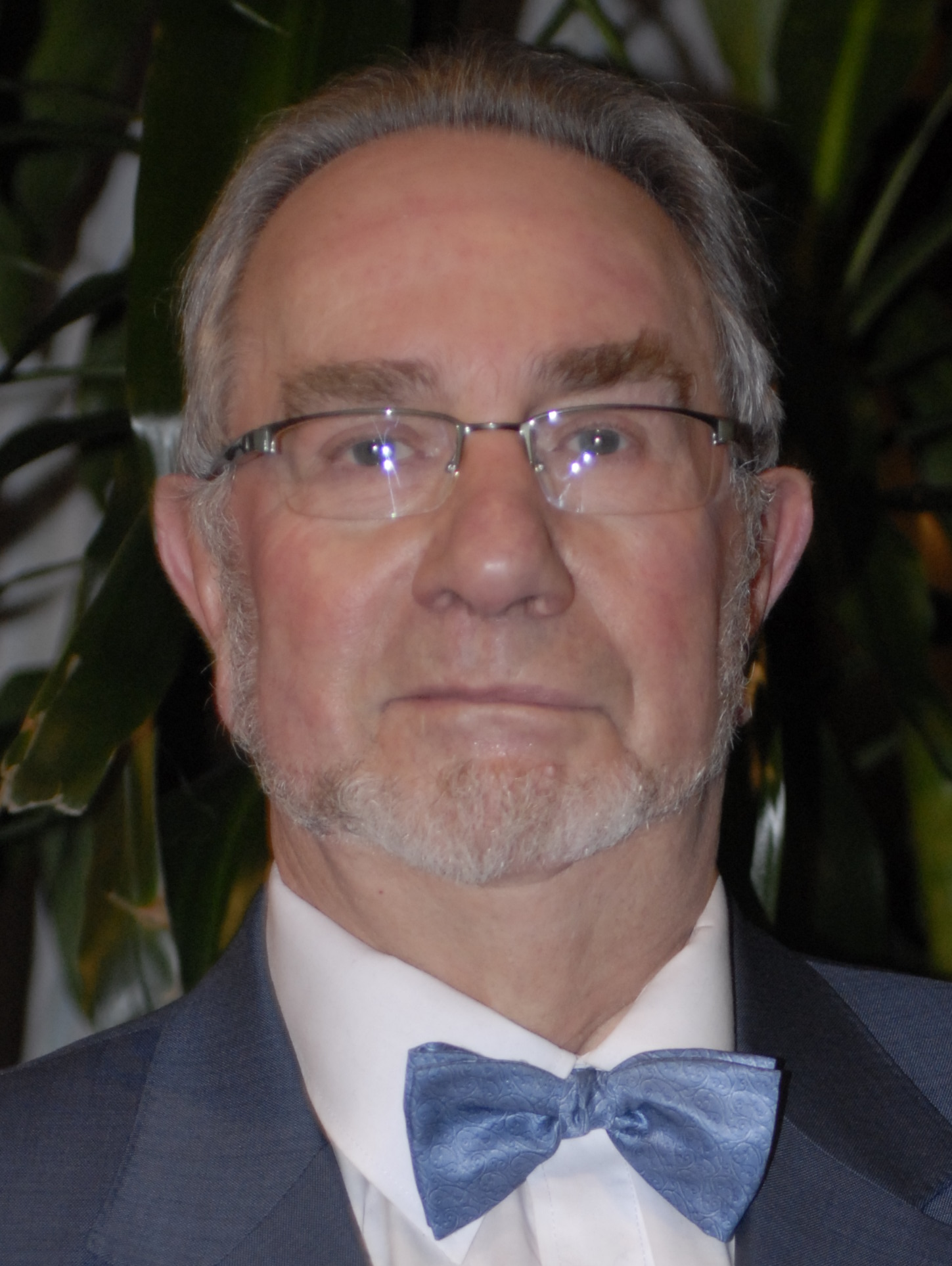
- Gabut in 2014
- Born: 9 August 1934; Chalon-sur-Saône, France
- Died: 25 October 2024 (aged 90); Lyon, France
- Occupations: Writer, journalist
- Employer: Le Progrès

Jean-Jacques Gabut (9 August 1934 – 25 October 2024) was a French writer and journalist.

Gabut started as editor-in-chief of Le Progrès for Chalon-sur-Saône, Annecy, and Lyon in 1968. He also taught at the École des nouveaux métiers de la communication and the Jean Moulin University Lyon 3. Additionally, he served as national director of the Grande Loge de France.

Gabut died on 25 October 2024 in Lyon at the age of 90.

== Distinctions ==
- Knight of the Legion of Honour (2005)
- Knight of the Ordre national du Mérite
- Combatant's Cross
- North Africa Security and Order Operations Commemorative Medal
- Medal of the Nation's Gratitude

== Publications ==
- "Lyon magique et sacré" (1994)
- "Église, religions et franc-maçonnerie" (1998)
- "La magie traditionnelle" (1999)
- "L’âge d’or de la bande dessinée, les illustrés d'enfants 1934-1944" (2004)
- "Les survivances chevaleresques dans la franc-maçonnerie du Rite écossais ancien et accepté" (2004)
- "Les poètes assassinés" (2006)
- "Les signes, les mots, les couleurs et les nombres dans la symbolique maçonnique" (2008)
- "Le message hermétique des imagiers du Moyen Âge" (2013)
- "Petite histoire des loges écossaises à Lyon" (2017)
- "Origines et fondements spirituels de la maçonnerie écossaise" (2017)
