= Marcel Amont =

French singer and actor (1929–2023)

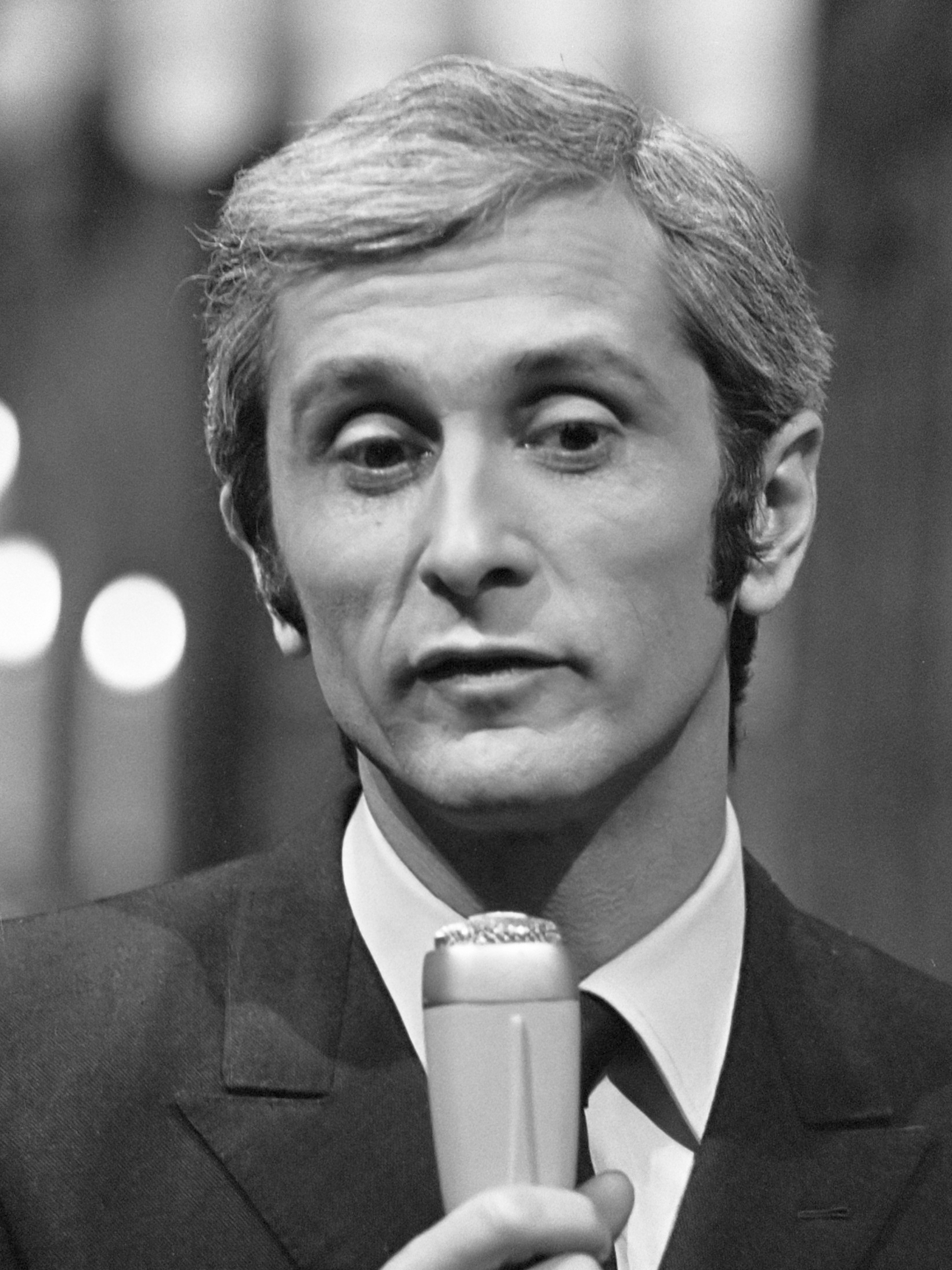
- Marcel Amont in 1969

Background information
- Born: Marcel Jean-Pierre Balthazar Miramon; 1 April 1929; Bordeaux, France
- Died: 8 March 2023 (aged 93) Saint-Cloud, France
- Genres: Pop; Chanson
- Occupations: Musician, singer
- Instruments: Vocals; Guitar
- Labels: Polydor; CGD; Fonit Cetra

Marcel Amont (French pronunciation: [maʁsɛl amɔ̃]; born Marcel Jean-Pierre Balthazar Miramon, [maʁsɛl ʒɑ̃ pjɛʁ baltazaʁ miʁamɔ̃]; 1 April 1929 – 8 March 2023) was a French singer of the 1960s and 1970s. Amont also recorded in Occitan and promoted Bearn culture from the 1950s.

Amont was one of the most popular singer in France and the most prolific of the French language, with a career lasting many years. He sold 300 million albums, recorded 30 albums, 79 singles, 126 EP's, 11 compilations and about 1,000 songs in different languages (English, Italian, Portuguese, Chinese, German, Irish and Spanish).

Amont is known for having performed songs by composers such as Georges Brassens, Léo Ferré and Georges Moustaki. His work was inspired by American pop and jazz in the style of Frank Sinatra, Tony Bennett and Andy Williams. He recorded international hits such as "Blue, bland, blond", "L'amour ça fait passer le temps", "Ballade pour l'espagnol", "Le plus beau tango du monde" and "Cathy, fais-moi danser". His song entitled "Un Mexicain" reached number 1 on the charts in France.

== First years ==
Marcel Jean Pierre Balthazar Miramon was born in Bordeaux. His father was Modeste Miramon and his mother Romélie Lamazou, both self-taught farmers from Etsaut in the Aspe Valley, who had settled in Bordeaux and retrained, he as a railway worker, she as a nurse. After graduating from high school, he hesitated between becoming a physical education teacher and attending drama school. Acting, and then finally singing, won out over sports.

At the end of 1950, having explored all the artistic activities in Bordeaux, he left for Paris, where he gradually made a name for himself in most of the cabarets on both banks (Villa d'Este, La Fontaine des Quatre-Saisons, etc.).

=== Beginnings ===
In 1951, Marcel Amont decided to try his luck in Paris and became famous performing in several cabarets.

In 1953, he toured with Jean Nohain as the opening act for Philippe Clay. He nearly died after the Bordeaux show and had to spend a year in a sanatorium. It was in 1956 that he truly achieved success. His first record, Escamillo, was a hit. He performed at the Olympia as the opening act for Édith Piaf: initially hired as a "supplement to the program," he was hailed as "revelation of the year" and finished five weeks later in second place on the bill. Buoyed by this success, he recorded his first live album and won the Charles Cros Academy Award and the Grand Prix du Disque in 1956. He also made his film debut alongside Brigitte Bardot in La mariée est trop belle. He was a frequent guest on the popular television program 36 chandelles.

He continued his successes, with Julie in 1957, but especially two big hits: in 1958, Tout doux tout doucement (Frank Gérald, Pierre Delanoë / Troxel, Christopher, Ellis), a French adaptation of the Fleetwoods' American hit Come Softly To Me, and, in 1959, one of his most emblematic songs, Bleu, blanc, blond (Jean Dréjac / Hal Greene, Dicks Wols), a French adaptation of Johnny Tillotson's American hit True, True Happiness.

Through his appearances in the films La mariée est trop belle (1956), together with Brigitte Bardot and La conduite à gauche (1961), Marcel acquired an increasing reputation in France.

Amont signed a record contract with Polydor Records in that same year when he released his first single Escamillo. In 1957 he released his first album entitled 'Marcel Amont' and also Bleu, Blanc, Blond.

Following his revelation in the late 1950s, Marcel Amont played more than 100 dates in 1962 on the stage of Bobino and two albums: Tout doux tout doucement (1959) and Bleu blanc blond (1959).

=== International career ===
At the beginning of the 1960s, Amont would develop a prolific career getting more than 5 gold albums and achieve successes such as «Les Bleuets d'Azur» and «Le balayeur du roy». In 1961 he recorded «Dans le coeur de ma blonde» which was sold in 80 million copies.

The following year he popularized the song composed by Charles Aznavour, "Un mexicain" which also reached number one in France. From that moment on, the public knew him as one of the most prolific singers in the Francophone world, although he was behind Charles Aznavour and Gilbert Bécaud.

In that same year in 1962, he offered his first solo exhibition to Bobino for 3 1/2 months, he sold out; In addition to his own texts, he created several songs signed by Claude Nougaro (Le Balayeur du Roy, Penholder, Tango of Twins, Le Jazz et la Java). He made his first tour in 1963 in Luxembourg in concert. Immediately afterwards, he released another album Fantaisie Sur Des Airs D'Opérettes with 14 songs.

In 1965, he returned to Olympia for five weeks. Very noticeable innovation: in its staging, it evolved around it with dancers. He would continue to record 45 rpm records until 1969. On 1 October 1967, he hosted the first color television show in the history of French television (Amont Tour).

=== Success ===
In the 1970s he changed his record label CBS Records and released his first album titled Amont-Tour. In 1970, at the Olympia, always in the company of his dancers and choristers, he surrounds himself with specialists and uses giant screens for certain staging. The success is such that the show lasts 5 weeks. Then he embodies the dynamic, smiling and light young singer, the scenic and popular repertoire. He is preparing a musical and, for this reason, rejects the offers of a US producer and the BBC.

It comes out with another North American version entitled "Can't Take My Eyes Off You" and in French called "Femme jolie on te yeux", the French version was composed by himself since he was also a songwriter. He participated in numerous variety shows in the 60s and 70s, especially those of Maritie and Gilbert Carpentier. In 1974, he is the host of the Sunday show Toutankhamont.

The following year Amont released another success that was sold in 50 million copies entitled "L'amour ça fait passer le temps" in 1971.

Like many leading artists of the 1960s and 1970s, the 1980s are hard on the French media plan, but for more than two decades, the very visual nature of their art opened the doors to the outdoors (touring Japan, Russia, recital at the Gould Foundation of San Francisco, Studio One in Rome for one year, etc.).

Amont puts to the music two texts by Georges Brassens (A Little Eva in excess, The Old Fossil), which he had awarded in 1976 «Le chapeau de Mireille».

=== Consecration ===
In 1980, he was part of the candidates for the French preselection for the Eurovision Song Contest with the song Camarade Vigneron. On 23 March, during the final pre-selection in TF1, presented by Évelyne Dhéliat, occupies the 4th place of 6 candidates following the votes of the spectators.

In the French plan, he finds a new life in the 2000s and in 2006, he returns with a new album time difference between Francis Dreyfus, the duets signature with Agnès Jaoui, Gérard Darmon, Didier Lockwood, Bireli Lagrené.

In 2007, he found Olympia, 50 years after his first visit.

At the end of 2008, he participated in the children's album by Guillaume Aldebert titled Enfantillages.

For two years, he is one of the stars of the Tender Age tour, the idol tour for seasons 3 and 4. In October 2009, he celebrated his 80th birthday with a series of recitals in the Grand Comedy in Paris.

In 2010, he participated in the album for children of Emma Daumas Les Larmes de Crodrilo, writing several texts and singing a duet with elle, about music by his son Mathias Miramon.

In 2012, after the publication of a memoir entitled At the time passes Boulevard (Editions Pirot), he published "Nevó", an illustrated picture book comes mainly from his personal albums (Editions Didier Carpentier). He returns to Paris at the Alhambra on 25 November to celebrate his more than 60-year career. It offers an animated and surprisingly modern show, between stand-up and singing, in an alloy of hits known by the general public, small scenic masterpieces and more recent titles, which delight his loyal public and a new generation of spectators. In 2013, his song Il has the yellow jersey appearing on the soundtrack of the film La Grande Boucle directed by Laurent Tuel.

The same year, he participated in the video "Because the night", a song by the collective Les Marguerites against Alzheimer, destined to fight against the disease.

In January 2014, Marianne Melodie / Universal Music released a double anthology CD (success from 1959 to 1975).

=== Later life and death ===
In March 2014, he published his seventh book, Letter to Friends, which collects fictitious letters sent to the people he loves and most of whom he has met. Among the recipients: Charles Aznavour, Maurice Chevalier, Yves Montand, Alain Souchon, François Morel, and Antoine de Caunes, among others.

Amont published an autobiography in 2015.

From November 2016 to February 2017, he participated in the tenth anniversary of "Age tend, the tour of idols", together with Gérard Lenorman, Sheila, Hugues Aufray, among others.

In 2018, Amont launched a new show "Marcel raconte et chante Amont", in which he recounted stories from his life in a stand-up style, alongside performances of his songs.

Marcel Amont married Tamara Vladimirovna Deiness in 1952 and divorced in 1959; He had three children, Pascual, Jean and Pierre. He was also romantically involved with Alice Kessler Amont died in Saint-Cloud on 8 March 2023, at the age of 93.

=== Legacy ===
Amont is also known for being the first French singer to perform in Béarnese after releasing his album Que canta en biarnés, in 1979.

Amont was honored in 2001 with the title of Knight of the Legion of Honour.

In 2017 he celebrated 65 years of artistic career, he continued to give concerts with sold out localities and selling records. Sales exceed 35 million copies, making him the third best-selling French singer in the country's music history, behind Michel Sardou and Johnny Hallyday.

=== Influence ===
Amont interpreted classical composer songs, including ones by:

- Boris Vian
- Guy Thomas
- Michelle Senlis
- Philippe Pauletto
- Guillaume Apollinaire
- Henri Gougaud
- Jacques Prévert

== Selected discography ==
=== Albums studio ===
- 1959: Bleu, Blanc, Blond
- 1961: Dans Le Coeur De Ma Blonde
- 1961: Marcel Amont
- 1962: Récital 1962
- 1962: Un Mexicain
- 1962: Nos Chansons de Leurs 20 Ans
- 1963: Le Barbier De Seville
- 1965: Ah C'qu'on A Rigolé Dimanche
- 1965: Chansons Des Iles Et D'ailleurs
- 1975: Pourquoi Tu Chanterais Pas ?
- 1979: Un Autre Amont
- 2006: Décalage Horaire

=== Singles ===
- 1956: Escamillo (Georges Coulonges / C. Roi)
- 1958: Julie (J. Datin – M. Vidalin)
- 1958: Mon manège à moi (N. Glanzberg – J. Constantin)
- 1959: Tout doux, tout doucement (Gretchen Christopher – Pierre Delanoë)
- 1959: Bleu blanc blond (Jean Dréjac / H. Green)
- 1960: Les bleuets d'azur (J. Larue / G Magenta)
- 1961: Dans le cœur de ma blonde (Jean Dréjac / N. Petty)
- 1961: La chanson du grillon (The cricket song) (Jean Dréjac)
- 1962: Un Mexicain (J. Plante / Charles Aznavour)
- 1963: Moi le clown (J.Mareuil – Ch. Aznavour)
- 1964: Dans le cœur de ma blonde (Jean Dréjac)
- 1965: Maria et le pot au lait (M. Amont)
- 1965: Au bal de ma banlieue (Jean Dréjac)
- 1970: Le monsieur qui volait (Claude Nougaro / M. Amont ])
- 1971: L'amour ça fait passer le temps (Rivat – Thomas / Vincent)
- 1971: Monsieur (G. Thibault / J. Renard)
- 1971: Benjamin le Bienheureux ( Y. Dessca / E. Charden)
- 1971: C'est aujourd'hui dimanche (Bernard Estardy – Jean-Michel Rivat / F. Thomas)
- 1974: Y a toujours un peintre (JM. Rivat- R. Vincent)
- 1974: Le chapeau de Mireille (Georges Brassens)
- 1975: Les artistes (M. Amont – J. Revaux / R. Vincent)
- 1976: La musique est de retour (M. Amont – M. Jourdan /Gustin)
- 1977: On ne guérit pas de son enfance (M. Amont / M. Cywie)
- 1979: Viennois (Alain Souchon)
- 1979: Paris rombière (Cavanna / R. Vincent)
- 1979: Pour traverser la rivière (Gilles Vigneault)
- 1979: La galère (Maxime Le Forestier / Julien Clerc)
- 1982: Demain j'arrête de fumer (Amont)
- 1985: Le tam-tam des gorilles (45 tours pour enfants)
- 1991: Sympathiq' (M. Amont)
- 2006 : Démodé (M. Amont / P. Loffredo)
- 2009 : Il a neigé (M. Amont / M. Miramon)

Mainly issued on Universal

== Books written by Amont ==
- Une chanson, qu'y a-t-il à l'intérieur d'une chanson? (Seuil, 1989)
- Ça se dit, ça s'écrit, ça se chante (Éd. Christian Pirot, 2000)
- Comment peut-on être gascon ? (Éd. Atlantica, 2001)
- Les plus belles chansons de Gascogne (Éd. Sud Ouest, 2006)
- Sur le boulevard du temps qui passe (Éd. Christian Pirot, 2009)
- Il a neigé (Éd. Didier Carpentier, 2012)
- Lettres à des amis (Éd. Chiflet & Cie, 2014)
