= Denis Huisman =

French academic and writer (1929–2021)

- Born: 13 April 1929; Paris, France
- Died: 2 February 2021 (aged 91); Paris, France
- Occupations: Academic; Writer

Denis Huisman (13 April 1929 – 2 February 2021) was a French academic and writer.

== Biography ==
Denis was born to Georges Huisman and Marcelle Wogue in the 16th arrondissement of Paris. His family was Jewish. On 8 April 1949, he married Gisèle Cahen, who he would divorce, and subsequently married Marie-Agnès Malfray. He then would marry Catherine Cremnitz, who he divorced and was then espoused to Marie-Françoise Cheilletz in 2013. His children were Arnaud, Bruno, Emmanuelle, Dominique, Sophie-Caroline, Elsa, and Violaine.

Huisman attended secondary school at the Lycée Montaigne, the Lycée Claude-Bernard, and the Lycée Henri-IV. He continued his studies at the Faculté des lettres de Paris and at Sciences Po. He earned a degree in philosophy and a doctorate in letters.

From 1947 to 1951, he taught at various secondary schools in Paris. He served as a lecturer at various universities across the world, such as the École alsacienne, the Beaux-Arts de Paris, New York University, HEC Paris, and Paris Dauphine University. He was also an associate at the French National Centre for Scientific Research.

In 1961, Huisman founded and became the President of the École française des attachés de presse, which sprouted off multiple branches. He also founded the Institut supérieur des carrières artistiques in 1963 and the École française du marketing in 1967. His institutions eventually merged into the École des nouveaux métiers de la communication. He was also a member of the Société des gens de lettres.

Denis Huisman died in Paris on 2 February 2021 at the age of 91.

== Distinctions ==
- Commander of the Legion of Honour (1998)
- Grand Officer of the Ordre national du Mérite (2011)
- Officer of the Ordre des Palmes académiques
- Commander of the Ordre des Arts et des Lettres
- Doctor honoris causa of the New York Institute of Technology and the University of Hull

== Books ==
- L'esthétique (1961)
- La grande aventure de la communication (1988)
- Âge du faire (1994)
- Histoire des philosophes illustrée par les textes (1996)
- Socrate sur internet (1997)
- Les plus grands textes de la philosophie orientale (2000)
- Les pages les plus célèbres de la philosophie occidentale (2000)
- Dictionnaire des mille œuvres clés de la philosophie (2000)
- Histoire de la philosophie française (2002)
- 1000 citations pour l'épreuve de français (2003)
- Socrate Chemins d'éternité (2003)
- Histoire de l'existentialisme (2005)
- La rage de communiquer (2006)
- La littérature française des origines à nos jours (2007)
- Dictionnaire des philosophes (2009)
- La philosophie sans complexe (2009)
