= Orly (chanson) =

1977 song by Jacques Brel

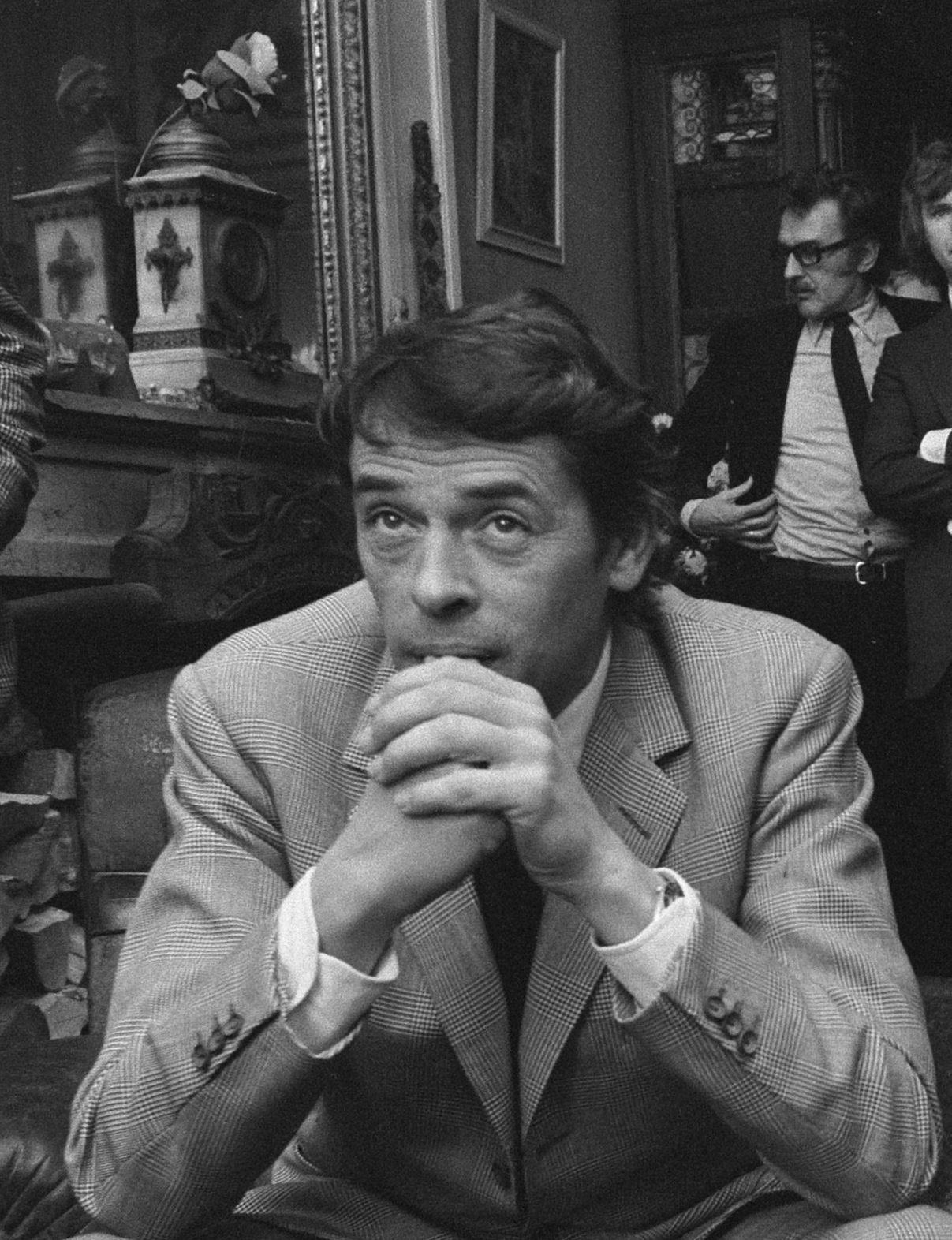
Brel in 1971

Orly is a chanson (song) in French by the Belgian songwriter Jacques Brel. It was recorded on 5 September 1977 and released on Brel's last long-playing record on Disques Barclay on 17 November of the same year. The album by the songwriter, who had returned from the South Seas after a long artistic break, became a public event in France. Orly is considered one of the outstanding songs on Brel's last release.

The song is about a pair of lovers who say goodbye to each other at Paris-Orly airport. Unusual for Brel's work is the narrator's role as an observer and the not primarily male point of view, which is directed towards the abandoned woman at the end. Orly can be interpreted not only as a sad love song, but also, with its allusions to illness and death, as the terminally ill songwriter's farewell to life. In the refrain, Brel concludes that life doesn't hand out gifts. By naming his colleague Gilbert Bécaud, he refers to his much more optimistic song Dimanche à Orly about longing for distant places at the airport.

== Lyrics and Music ==
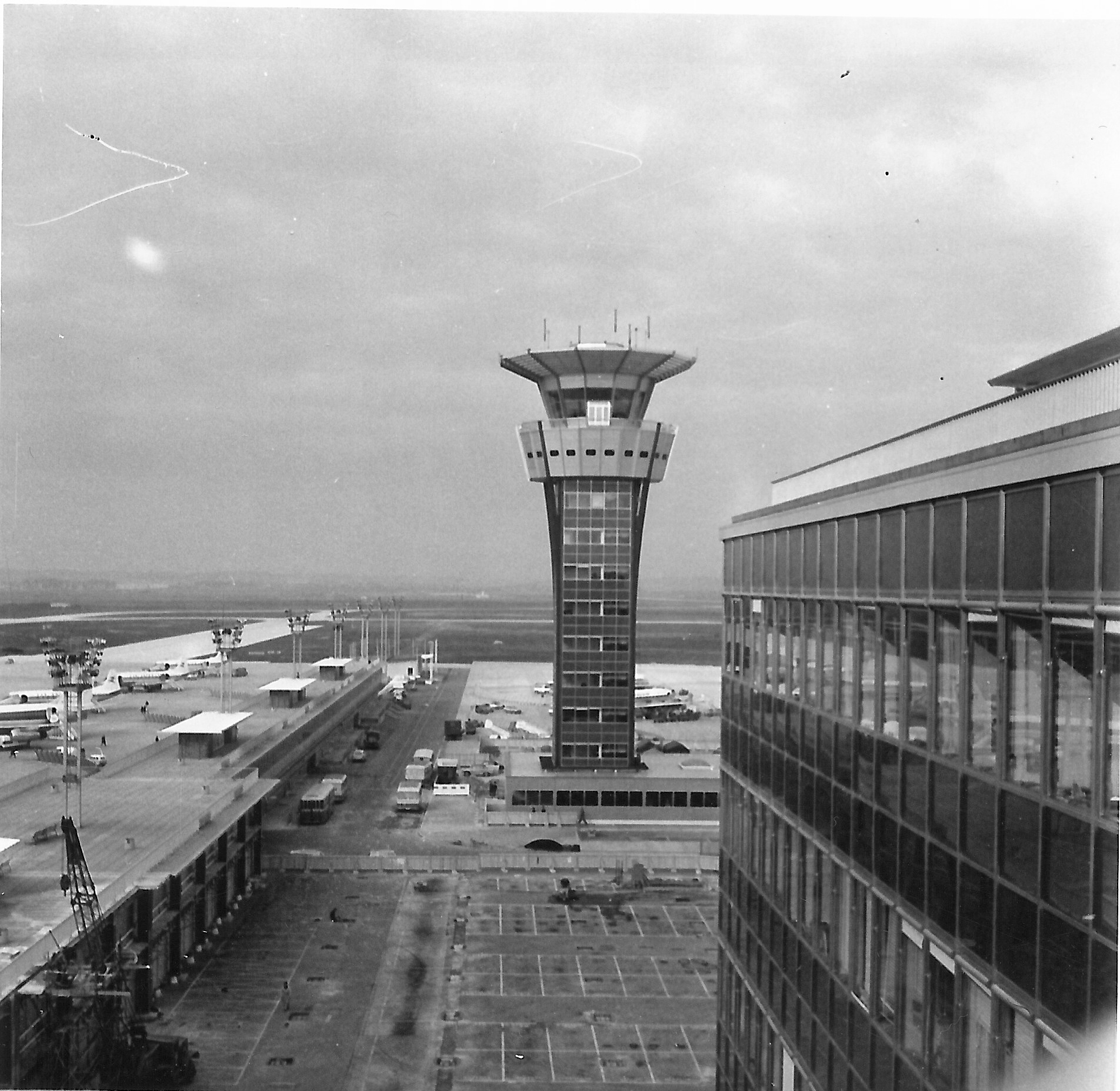
Tower at Paris-Orly Airport, 1966

Sundays in Orly: over two thousand people stream through the airport, but the narrator only has eyes for two, a pair of lovers standing in the rain, hugging each other so tightly that their bodies merge. They affirm their love in tears, but make no promises to each other that they cannot keep. Finally, their bodies slowly separate, holding each other again, until the man abruptly turns away and is swallowed up by a staircase. The woman is left behind, open-mouthed, suddenly aged, as if she had met her death. She has often lost men in the past, but this time it is love that she has lost. She feels fragile, as if she were for sale. The narrator tries to follow her, but then she is also swallowed up by the crowd.

The chorus goes:

«La vie ne fait pas de cadeau

Et nom de Dieu c’est triste

Orly le dimanche

Avec ou sans Bécaud»

– Jacques Brel: Orly

Which can be translated as: "Life doesn't give presents. And in God's name (also stronger: damn it), it's sad on Sundays in Orly, with or without Bécaud."

The verses take some liberties with the rhymes, but strictly adhere to the verse meter of half alexandrines. The melody is decidedly monotonous. It begins with the alternation of two simple chords on a gently strummed guitar, which, according to Hubert Thébault, creates the effect of a heartbeat: the tonic and dominant seventh chords in C minor to the first and third quarter notes of a three-quarter bar. While Brel accompanies himself alone throughout the first verse, the orchestra conducted by his long-time arranger François Rauber only enters explosively after the first refrain. The four accentuated entries have the effect of "an acoustic exclamation mark." From the second verse onwards, the strings set the rhythm, while the wind instruments support Brel's characteristic crescendo in the third verse. Ulf Kubanke speaks of a "blown, echoing brass echo", Hubert Thébault recalls the fanfares of the trumpets as reminiscent of a bullfight. As was typical of the collaboration between Brel and Rauber, Brel had precise ideas about the musical style and instrumentation from the beginning, including the trumpet part, but then let Rauber work out the details.

== Background and origins ==
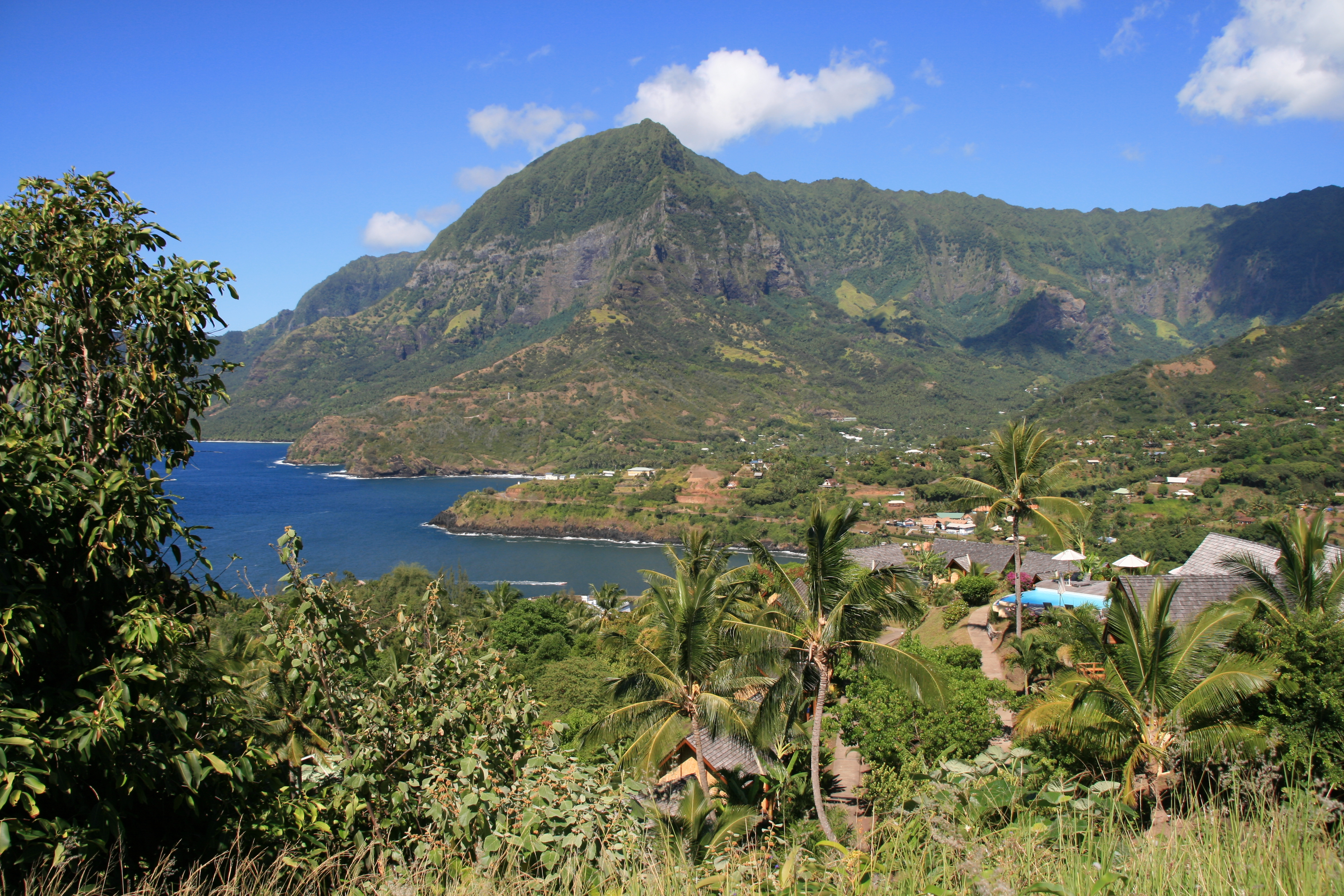
Atuona on Hiva Oa

In May 1967, at the age of just 38, Brel gave his farewell performance as a songwriter on stage. The following year, one last LP was released, after which Brel only appeared in a musical and various films. In November 1974, the singer, who was suffering from lung cancer, had to undergo an operation to remove part of his lung. In December of the same year, he and his lover Maddly Bamy set off on an Atlantic crossing by sailing ship. A few weeks earlier, he had said goodbye to another lover named Monique, whom he never saw again. Eddy Przybylski assumes that this separation at an airport (not in Orly, but with Paris airport as the destination) is the biographical background to the song Orly. Brel's journey took him to the Marquesas Islands over several stops, where he settled permanently on Hiva Oa in June 1976. On the island where Paul Gauguin had already spent his last years, Brel once again found the inspiration for seventeen new songs about "a few things that have been on my mind for fifteen years".

In August 1977, Brel surprised his old companions by returning to Paris at short notice. He hid in a small hotel near the Place de l'Étoile from the French public, where there were rumors that the songwriter was terminally ill. In his luggage he had a cassette with rehearsal recordings of his new songs. Gérard Jouannest criticized the monotony of the melodies, but François Rauber embellished them with his arrangements. Eddie Barclay rented a studio in Avenue Hoche for the recordings. Brel recorded the songs together with an orchestra conducted by Rauber, but never more than two songs per session, which had to be completed in just a few takes. Brel's voice had deteriorated and he could only sing for a maximum of three hours at a time before he had to take a break. He tried to lighten the tense mood in the crowded studio with jokes about his missing lung. Orly, with Jojo, was one of the first two songs Brel recorded on 5 September.

When Brel's last record was released on 17 November 1977, it triggered an enormous response from the public. The record had no title, the cover showed only the four letters of his surname against a blue cloudy sky. Barclay did not do any conventional advertising, but by demonstrating secrecy, delivering locked containers and opening the combination locks at the same time, he created a special advertising hit that caused expectations to skyrocket and resulted in 1 million pre-orders. Brel, who had already left Paris for the South Seas, was annoyed by the hype. He lived in Hiva Oa for another six months until his health deteriorated to such an extent that he had to return to Paris in July 1978, this time for chemotherapy. Three months later, he died of heart failure on 9 October 1978 in Bobigny near Paris.

== Interpretation ==
=== Love and separation ===
According to Maddly Bamy, Brel described Orly as "une belle chanson d'amour" ("a beautiful love song"). For Sara Poole, it is on a par with songs such as Ne me quitte pas or Madeleine, which powerfully and dramatically evoke despair and being at the mercy of deep passions. Monique Watrin's "mini-tragedy" Orly is reminiscent of the early, passionate Brel from 1959, the year in which he wrote the "love song of the century" (according to Frédéric Brun) with Ne me quitte pas. From the point of view of his song colleague Serge Lama, Brel only wrote four real love songs: Ne me quitte pas, La chanson des vieux amants, Orly and Jojo. For Anne Bauer, Orly is even the "only song by Brel in which there is love without reservations, without ulterior motives and without lies".

Orly describes the painful separation of a couple who love each other but are unable to stay together due to unfulfilled circumstances. Unlike songs such as Je ne sais pas (1958) or La Colombe (1959), the separation does not take place on a train platform, but in the midst of the crowds at a busy airport. And also unlike earlier songs, Brel stays completely out of the action and limits himself to describing what he sees. In doing so, he uses quasi-filmic stylistic devices and focuses the lens alternately on the couple as a whole and the individual people, their behavior, their gestures, their looks and their tears, with which he paints a disillusioned picture of human existence. The introductory lines "Ils sont plus de deux mille / Et je ne vois qu'eux deux" ("They are over two thousand and I only see them both"), which are repeated twice in the course of the first two verses, serve as a kind of leitmotif. They serve to focus the narrator's gaze from the general to the particular.

At the beginning, Brel shows the couple as a unit with expressions such as "eux deux", "ces deux", "tous les deux" and "ils" ("they both", "these two", "both of them" and "they"). It evokes the image of a very close, intimate union in the listener. This is reinforced by the external circumstances, the rain that covers them both and is reflected in their tears, as well as the shared fire that burns within them both. During the first, reluctant attempts at separation, the movement of the two bodies in relation to each other is reminiscent of natural elements, of ebb and flow. The couple stands out from the surrounding crowd, not only through the focus of the viewer, but also by living a love that remains incomprehensible to the others, condemned by them. It is a love that knows its limitations, that does not need false promises and that grows through the obstacle between the lovers.

With the separation of the couple, the individual beings emerge. Both cope with the pain in their own way, which for Watrin conveys typical gender roles. First, the man becomes recognizable as an independent person. Here Brel works with a syllepse, in which it is only corrected in retrospect that it was the man alone who cried out his pain in "gros bouillons" ("thick broth"). For Sara Poole, this combination of the phrases "bouillir à gros bouillons" ("boil quickly") and "pleurer à chaudes larmes" ("cry his eyes out") is equally associated with thick tears, desperate, uncontrolled sobbing and a passionate, feverish heat. The man is also the first who can no longer bear the suffering, neither his own nor that of his partner. He flees into activity and abruptly carries out the separation that had previously been repeatedly postponed.

The woman is left behind. As before with the man's tears, Brel also resorts to hyperbole for her pain, to the stylistic device of exaggeration and, according to Patrick Baton, a veritable explosion of time: "Ses bras vont jusqu'à terre / Ça y est elle a mille ans" ("Her arms go down to the ground / It's time, she's a thousand years old"). According to Hubert Thébault, the farewells of lovers in Brel's songs have always been as heartbreaking and final as death. After the loss of love, the woman thinks she has met her own death. The connection between love and death is followed by a symbolic circle as she turns around herself alone. She refuses to acknowledge reality and imagines impossible happiness in order to maintain her life. In the end, she feels "à vendre" ("for sale"), because Brel's songs' characters believe even less in eternal fidelity than in eternal love. For Watrin, however, the vocabulary also contains the possibility of a life without the other, the opening of a new dimension of one's own future.

According to Sara Poole, there are no winners in the couple's separation. Both suffer equally. What is unusual in Orly, however, is that for the first time in Brel's work, it is not the man but the woman who is portrayed as abandoned, as a victim who receives the sympathy and compassion of the songwriter. Poole finds the portrayal of the abandoned woman incomparably more touching than, for example, the vainly waiting admirer with his bouquet of flowers in Madeleine. Like Michaela Weiss, she contrasts the empathy of this song with the frequently voiced accusation of misogyny in Brel's songs such as Les biches. Marc Robine asks with regard to this accusation: "mais comment peut-on encore y croire après avoir écouté Orly?" ("how can one still believe it?"). ("how can one still believe in it after having heard Orly?") For Bruno Hongre and Paul Lidsky, it is Brel's final message, after the exclusively male perspective of his songs, to have empathized with the broken heart of a woman with such intensity at the end.

=== Sickness and death ===
Brel himself pointed out a different, more personal reading of the song in a conversation with his friend, the physician Paul-Robert Thomas, in 1978:

«As-tu écouté ma chanson Orly avec attention? Il s’agit de deux amants qui se séparent, mais surtout d’une métaphore de la Vie et de la Mort. D’un être qui sent sa vie lui échapper; le jour où, par exemple, il décide de partir se faire soigner. Et l’avion se pose à Orly! Dernier aéroport, pour un dernier voyage…»

"Have you listened carefully to my song Orly? It's about two lovers who part, but above all it's a metaphor for Life and Death. Of a being who feels his life slipping away from him; the day when, for example, he decides to leave for treatment. And the plane lands at Orly! Last airport, for a last journey... "

Jacques Brel: Interview with Paul-Robert Thomas

According to Sara Poole, the petrified woman left behind faces a future from which meaning and life have disappeared after the man has been "swallowed up" by the staircase ("Bouffé"). For Brel's daughter France and André Sallée, it is a staircase into darkness that devours the man as if he were being consumed by a disease. Jean-Luc Pétry also recognizes this illness in the juxtaposition of the couple with the surrounding crowd: the skinny bodies of the lovers are surrounded by healthy, well-fed air travellers who become voyeurs of their pain. The good constitution of the bystanders is reproached by the narrator with terms such as "adipeux en sueur" ("sweating fats") or "bouffeurs d'espoir" ("bearers of hope", literally: "eaters of hope"), so indecent does their health appear next to the suffering couple.

In his interpretation for the RTBF, Sébastien Ministru continues: "L'escalier, c'est la mort." ("The staircase, that's death.") It is explicitly about the disappearance of the man, and this in a vocabulary that does not come from a departure lounge, but from a death chamber: dry bodies, drooling words, grief, tears, a scream, a restless hand like a last outburst of life. In all of this is the description of a death struggle, the last breaths of a dying person. It is a farewell greeting from the terminally ill Brel, who died eleven months after the release of his last album.

=== With or without Bécaud ===
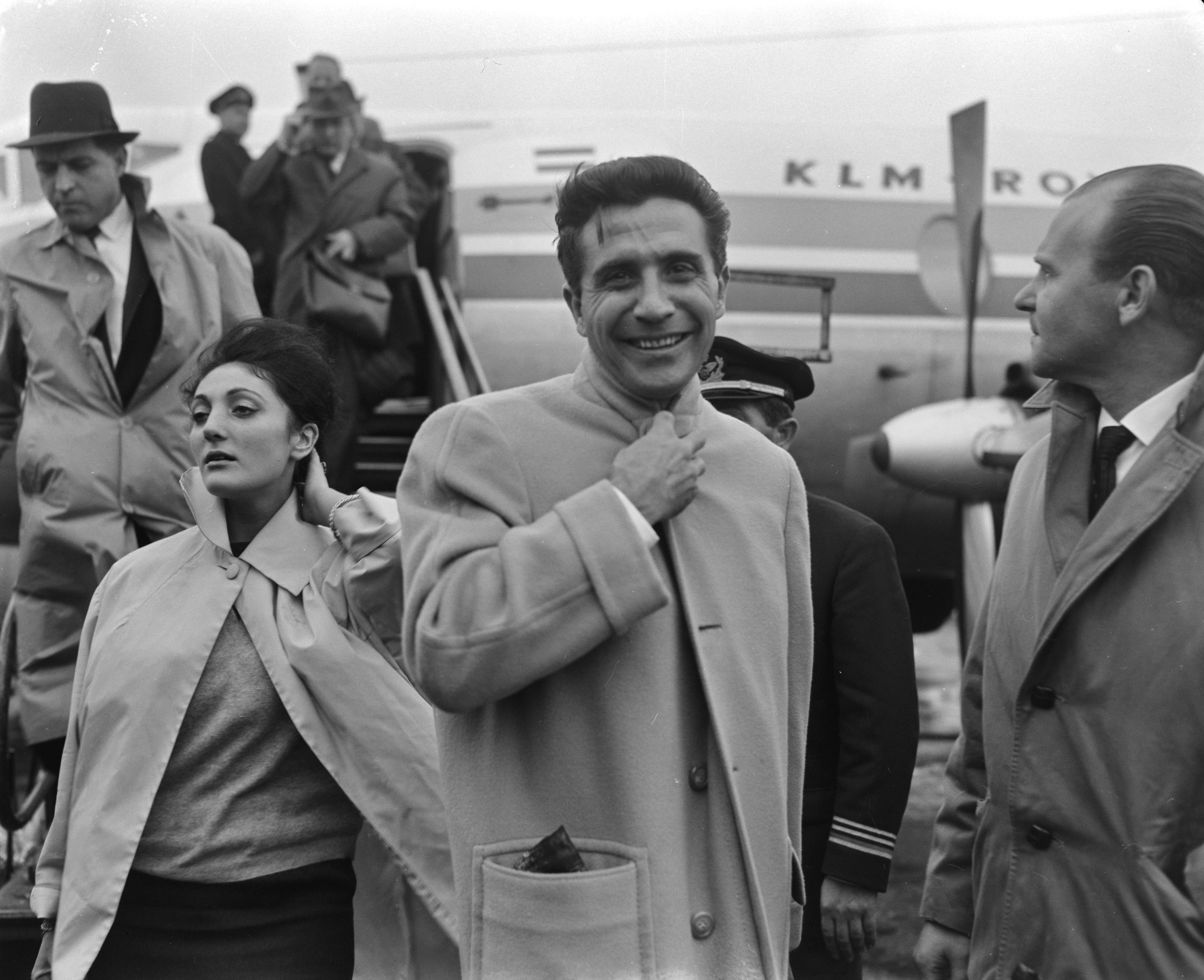
Gilbert Bécaud at Amsterdam Schiphol Airport in 1961

In the chorus of Orly, Brel refers to a famous song by his fellow songwriter Gilbert Bécaud from 1963: Dimanche à Orly. The lyrics are by Pierre Delanoë, the music by Bécaud. It is about the hopeful fantasies of a young employee who goes to Paris-Orly airport every Sunday to watch the planes and dream of faraway lands. One day, he hopes, he will be on one of those planes himself. The chorus begins with the verses

«Je m’en vais l’ dimanche à Orly.

Sur l’aéroport, on voit s’envoler

Des avions pour tous les pays.

Pour l’après-midi… J’ai de quoi rêver.»

– Pierre Delanoë: Dimanche à Orly

The translation is something like: "I'm going to Orly on Sunday. At the airport you can see planes flying to all countries. For the afternoon... I have something to dream about."

Bécaud's song, written fourteen years before Brel's Orly, tells of a time when the airport was France's biggest visitor attraction, even before the Eiffel Tower. After the inauguration of the Orly South Terminal in 1961, 10,000 travelers and just as many visitors came every day to spend the day in restaurants, cinemas, shopping arcades and on three visitor terraces. The airport, a "huge monument of glass and steel" ("vaste monument de glaces et d'acier"), stood for modernity and sophistication, as you could sometimes catch a glimpse of the travelling stars. The romanticizing mood of Dimanche à Orly was summed up by physicist Jeremy Bernstein: "The cheer is relentless." And he concludes that this must have got on Brel's nerves.

According to André Gaulin, Brel's Orly is a veritable "anti-version" of Bécaud's predecessor. Chris Tinker explains that life can be cruel and tragic even when the cheerful songs of Brel's contemporaries trickle out of the loudspeaker. Bécaud did not exactly feel honored by Brel's mention by name. Claude Lemesle judged it to be an "unnecessary allusion" ("l'inutile allusion") to the colleague, for which Brel later apologized by telephone. The Dutch journalist Pieter Steinz, on the other hand, just appreciated the comic relief with which the melancholy of Orly is put into perspective by a "witty musical reference" to the fellow songwriter.

== Reception ==
While Brel's last long-playing record was met with a wide range of very different reviews by French critics (from negative to very positive), the song Orly was often singled out positively from his work as a whole. In Télérama, for example, Jacques Marquis criticized the declining lyrics and outdated music, but classified Orly under "trois ou quatre beaux titres" ("three or four beautiful titles") on the record. In L'Express, Danièle Heymann had words of praise for Brel's release throughout, but gave Orly special praise as "la plus belle chanson de rupture depuis Les Feuilles mortes" ("the most beautiful song about separation since Les Feuilles mortes"). Looking back, Ulf Kubanke also considered Orly to be the "highlight of the album" in his review in laut.de. And Gilles Verlant described Orly, together with La ville s'endormait and Les marquises, as "trois des plus belles chansons jamais écrites par Brel" ("three of the most beautiful songs Brel has ever written").

Brel's older brother Pierre Brel saw Orly as the most impressive song from his younger brother's entire repertoire. Claude Lemesle described it as a "chef-d'œuvre" ("masterpiece"). Jérôme Pintoux judged: "Une chanson mélo, pathétique. Un peu trop longue peut-être." ("A melodramatic, pathetic song. A little too long perhaps.") Pieter Steinz wrote in 1996: "Het is het droevigste afscheidslied dat ik ken." ("It is the saddest farewell song I know.") In 2015, a year before his death, Steinz, who was suffering from ALS, also chose the song as the background music for his own funeral service.

Orly has been recorded in more than 30 cover versions. These include translations into Afrikaans, English, Italian, Dutch and Russian. Loek Huisman translated the song into German under the title Flugplatz. Michael Heltau sang the version in 1989 on the album Heltau - Brel Vol 2. The French original was interpreted by Dominique Horwitz (1997 on Singt Jacques Brel and 2012 on Best of Live - Jacques Brel), Vadim Piankov (1998 on Chante Jacques Brel, 2001 on Brel... Barbara and 2009 on Vadim Piankov interprète Jacques Brel), Anne Sylvestre (2000 on Souvenirs de France), Pierre Bachelet (2003 on Tu ne nous quittes pas), Florent Pagny (2007 on Pagny chante Brel and 2008 on De part et d'autre), Laurence Revey (2008 on Laurence Revey) and Maurane (2018 on Brel).

== Bibliography ==
- Jacques Brel: Tout Brel. Laffont, Paris 2003, ISBN 978-2-264-03371-0, pp. 355–357 (Reprint of the text).
- Jean-Luc Pétry: Jacques Brel. Textes et Chansons. Ellipses, Paris 2003, ISBN 978-2-7298-1169-3, pp. 60–67.
- Hubert Thébault: Orly. In: Christian-Louis Eclimont (ed.): 1000 Chansons françaises de 1920 à nos jours. Flammarion, Paris 2012, ISBN 978-2-08-125078-9, pp. 547–548.
- Monique Watrin: Brel. La quête du bonheur. Sévigny, Clamart 1990, ISBN 978-2-907763-10-3, pp. 212–216.
