= Jean Dréjac =

French singer and composer (1921–2003)

- Born: Jean André Jacques Brun; 3 June 1921; Grenoble, France
- Died: 11 August 2003 (aged 82); Paris, France
- Occupations: Singer, composer
- Years active: 1940–2003
- Awards: Commandeur de l'Ordre des Arts et Lettres
- Website: Jean Dréjac

Jean Dréjac (French pronunciation: [ʒɑ̃ dʁeʒak]), stage name of Jean André Jacques Brun (3 June 1921 – 11 August 2003), was a French singer and composer.

He is noted for writing the songs "Ah! Le petit vin blanc", "Sous le ciel de Paris" and "La Chansonnette" (for Yves Montand) the French adaptations of "Black Denim Trousers and Motorcycle Boots" for Édith Piaf and "Bleu, blanc, blond" for Marcel Amont, and various songs for Serge Reggiani (with Michel Legrand as composer).

He was an adjoint secretary of the Société des auteurs, compositeurs et éditeurs de musique from 1967 to 1969, and a vice-president from 1977 to 2002.

He is the father of writer Frédéric Brun, born in 1960 in Paris.

== Honors ==
- 2003: Commandeur de l'Ordre des Arts et Lettres.

== Bibliography ==
- Jean Dréjac (2006). Christian Pirot (ed.). Comme elle est longue à mourir ma jeunesse (in French). Saint-Cyr-sur-Loire. p. 208. ISBN 9782868082350..
- Frédéric Brun (2008). Le Roman de Jean (in French). Paris: Stock (publishing house). p. 168. ISBN 9782234060272. Archived from the original on 2017-08-31..
