= Vincent Almendros =

French novelist (born 1978)

- In a 2024 interview
- Born: 1978 (age 47–48); Avignon, France
- Education: University of Avignon
- Occupation: Novelist

Vincent Almendros (born 1978) is a French novelist.

== Biography ==
Vincent Almendros was born in Avignon in 1978. He studied letters at the University of Avignon before beginning to write poetry and prose. He sent his first completed novel, Ma chère Lise, to Jean-Philippe Toussaint for his advice. Toussaint appreciated it and introduced the author to Irène Lindon, which led to its publication in 2011. In 2015, his second novel Un été, much welcomed by the critics, was awarded the prix Françoise Sagan in June of that year.

== Works ==
- 2011: Ma chère Lise, Les Éditions de Minuit, ISBN 978-2707321947
- 2015: Un été, Les Éditions de Minuit, ISBN 978-2707328120 – prix Françoise Sagan
