= Olivier Bouillère =

French architect

Olivier Bouillère (born 1970) is a French writer, whose works are published by the Éditions P.O.L. Olivier Bouillère is an architect.

== Publications ==
- Rétro, P.O.L, 2008 ISBN 978-2-84682-232-9
- Le Poivre, P.O.L, 2012 ISBN 978-2-8180-1667-1

== Prizes and distinctions ==
- 2013: Prix Françoise Sagan for Le Poivre
