= Violaine Huisman =

French writer

- In a 2024 interview
- Born: 1979 (age 46–47); Paris, France
- Notable work: The Book of Mother

Violaine Huisman (born 1979) is a French writer. Her debut novel, The Book of Mother, won Prix Françoise Sagan and was longlisted for the International Booker Prize.

== Early life and education ==
Violaine Huisman was born in 1979, in Paris. Her father was the French academic Denis Huisman, her mother Catherine Cremnitz. She attended Lycée Henri-IV in Paris. When she was nineteen, she moved to the United States, where she completed her studies.

== Career ==
Huisman has lived in New York for over two decades. She worked in publishing and translated novels. Huisman has coordinated the literary series at the Brooklyn Academy of Music, as well as managed multidisciplinary arts festivals. She works as an essayist and cultural journalist and has written for such publications as The New York Times, Vogue and The Paris Review.

Huisman's debut novel The Book of Mother was published by Éditions Gallimard in 2018 and tells the story of a Parisian woman's life, told partially through the eyes of her young daughter. The novel addresses parts of the family history of Huisman, akin to autofiction. It gained various literary awards, including Prix Françoise Sagan and the Prix Marie Claire. It was also longlisted for the International Booker Prize 2022 and was included in The New York Times 100 Notable Books list.

Her 2024 novel, Les Monuments de Paris, once more looks back on the history of her family, this time focusing on her father Denis Huisman and her grandfather Georges Huisman. The book won the Prix Anna de Noailles awarded by the Académie Française and the inaugural Prix Littéraire Who’s Who.

== Works ==
- Fugitive parce que reine (2018)
  - English ed.: The Book of Mother (2021). Scribner. trans. by Leslie Camhi
- Rose Désert (2019)
- Les Monuments de Paris (2024)
  - The Monuments of Paris. New York: Penguin Publishing Group. 2026. ISBN 978-0-593-83376-6.
