= Franck Maubert =

French novelist and essayist

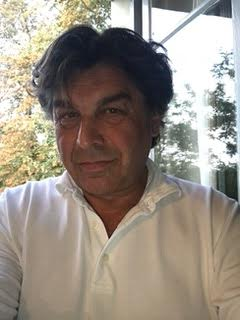
Portrait of Franck Maubert, writer, essayist.

Franck Maubert (born in 1955) is a French novelist and essayist. Maubert is the author of three novels and several works devoted to painting and song. He was a juror in the 2015 prix Françoise Sagan.

== Works ==
- 1985: La Peinture moderne, éd. Nathan, essay
- 1997: Lexique Toxique,
- 2002: Est-ce bien la nuit ?, Stock, novel
- 2003: Près d'elles, Flammarion, novel
- 2005: Le Paris de Lautrec, éd. Assouline.
- 2005: Et les arbres n'en seront pas moins verts, éd. Assouline.
- 2005: Gainsbourg for ever, éd. Scali
- 2006: with Isabelle Maeght and Yoyo Maeght, Maeght: L'Aventure de l'art vivant, éd. de La Martinière. The amazing story of the Maeght family.
- 2005: La Mélancolie de Nino, éd. Scali
- 2008: Le Père de mon père, éd. Philippe Rey, novel
- 2009: L'odeur du sang humain ne me quitte pas des yeux : Conversations avec Francis Bacon, éd. Mille et une nuits
- 2012: Le Dernier modèle, Fayard / Mille et une nuits, ISBN 2755506520. Dans le Montparnasse de l'après-guerre.

- Prix Renaudot de l'essai 2012.

- 2013: Ville Close, éd. Écriture
- 2014: Visible la nuit, Fayard
- 2015: Les Uns contre les autres, Fayard
- 2018 :L'Eau qui passe, éd. Gallimard, coll. Blanche – Prix Jean-Freustié 2019
- 2019: Avec Bacon, éd. Gallimard
- 2020 :Le bruit de la mer, éd. Flammarion
