= C'est arrivé à 36 chandelles =

- Directed by: Henri Diamant-Berger
- Screenplay by: Jean Nohain; Dominique Nohain
- Produced by: Mathew Hayden
- Starring: Guy Bertil; Jane Sourza; Brigitte Barbier; Jacques Riberolles; Silvia Solar
- Production companies: Le Film d'Art; Les Films Fernand Rivers et Panorama Films
- Release date: October 16, 1957
- Running time: 105 minutes
- Country: United States
- Language: French

C'est arrivé à 36 chandelles (It Happened on the 36 Candles) is a French film directed by Henri Diamant-Berger. It was released in cinemas on October 16, 1957.

== Plot ==
A young woman is distraught that she can't marry the man she loves but finds happiness whilst appearing on the French television show 36 chandelles.

== Cast ==
- Guy Bertil : Hugues, the nephew of the minister
- Jane Sourza : Desjardins - Minister of Youth and Sport
- Brigitte Barbier : Brigitte Magnin
- Jacques Riberolles
- Silvia Solar
- Lona Rita
- Max Elloy
- Paul Demange
- René Hiéronimus
- Denise Kerny
