= Sous le ciel de Paris (song) =

1951 song by Jean Bretonnière

Song by Jean Bretonnière
- Published: 1951 by Choudens
- Genre: Chanson
- Composer: Hubert Giraud
- Lyricist: Jean Dréjac

"Sous le ciel de Paris" (pronounced [su l(ə) sjɛl də paʁi]) is a song initially written for the 1951 French film Under the Sky of Paris (Sous le ciel de Paris), directed by Julien Duvivier. In the film it was sung by Jean Bretonnière.

In the same year it was also recorded by Juliette Gréco, as well as Anny Gould. Thanks to Gréco and subsequent recordings by artists such as Édith Piaf (1954) and Yves Montand (1964) which popularised it, the song became a symbol of Paris for the world.

== Writing and composition ==
The song was written for the film by Hubert Giraud (music) and Jean Dréjac (lyrics).

== Other language versions and covers ==
The song has been also notably recorded by:

- Mireille Mathieu (both in French and in German under the title "Unter dem Himmel von Paris")
- Zaz, Belinda Carlisle, Mieke & Bart Kaëll (in Dutch under the title "Onder de blauwe lucht van Parijs)
- Hildegard Knef (in German under the title "Unter dem Himmel von Paris")
- Plácido Domingo with Josh Groban
- Florence Coste & Julien Dassin
- Lisa Angell
- Matthias Lens
- André Rieu
- Karrin Allyson (in French under the title "Sous le ciel de Paris (Under Paris Skies)")
- Enrico Macias
- Willy Bischof

English lyrics were written for the song by Kim Gannon. The English version was titled "Under Paris Skies". It was recorded in that form by:

- Earl Grant (for his 1959 album Paris Is My Boat)
- Andy Williams released a version on his 1960 album, Under Paris Skies.
- Bing Crosby (for his 1962 LP Holiday in Europe)
- Jane Morgan (for her 1964 album The Last Time I Saw Paris)
- Sam Cooke
- Chris Connor
