= Jean-Claude Lamy =

French writer, journalist and publisher (1941–2025)

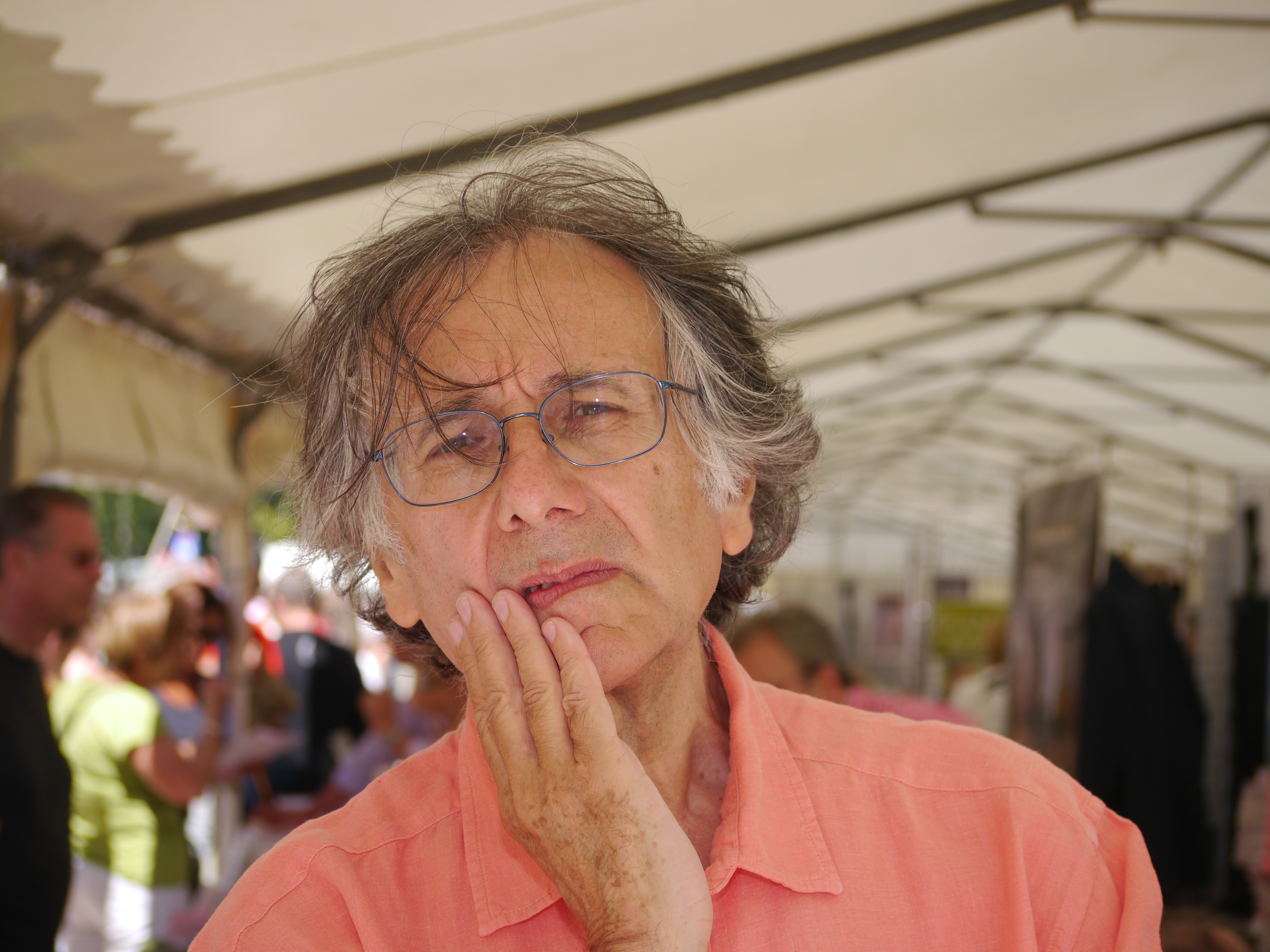
- Lamy in 2011
- Born: 3 August 1941; Valence, Drôme, France
- Died: 2 February 2025 (aged 83); Île-aux-Moines, Morbihan, France
- Citizenship: French
- Education: Centre de Formation des Journalistes
- Occupations: Journalist, Writer, Editor, Biographer
- Years active: 1960s–2020s
- Notable work: Françoise Sagan, Prévert, Les frères amis, Brassens, le mécréant de Dieu
- Partner: Françoise Sagan (biography subject)
- Awards: Prix Goncourt de la Biographie, Prix Louis-Barthou, Prix François-Billetdoux

Jean-Claude Lamy (3 August 1941 – 2 February 2025) was a French journalist, writer and publisher.

== Biography ==
=== Early life and education ===
Jean-Claude Lamy was born in Valence, Drôme, France on 3 August 1941. He studied journalism at the Centre de Formation des Journalistes (CFJ), where he trained before entering the profession in the 1960s.

=== Journalistic career ===
As a journalist, Jean-Claude Lamy joined France-Soir in the 60s where he stayed over thirty years. There he met Pierre Lazareff and wrote the first biography of the famous newspaper's director. In addition, he was also a chronicler at Le Figaro, through which he met the great writers of his time (Hervé Bazin, Marguerite Duras, Albert Cohen, Marguerite Yourcenar, François Nourissier, Paul Gordeaux etc.) of whom he realized the portraits through interviews. Since 2001, Jean-Claude Lamy was a columnist at the Midi Libre.

In the 1970s, Jean-Claude Lamy became a close friend of Françoise Sagan. The novelist confided her memories, and he wrote, with her agreement and complicity, an important biography, Françoise Sagan, une légende (Mercure de France).

Passionate about publishing, and popular novel, in particular the adventures of Arsène Lupin and Rouletabille, he created the "Cercle Gaston Leroux" with the daughter of the author of the Mystère de la chambre jaune. Among the first members were Jacques and Pierre Prévert, who later inspired his new book, which was crowned by the Goncourt of biography in 2008.

In 2011, he was one of the members of the jury of the Prix Françoise Sagan.

=== Death ===
Lamy died on 2 February 2025, at the age of 83.

== Works (selection) ==
- 1972: Au petit bonheur la Chambre, with Marc Kunstlé, cartoons by Cabu, éditions Julliard
- 2000: La Belle Inconnue, Éditions du Rocher, ISBN 978-2268035314 prix François-Billetdoux
- 2001: La Guerre, mademoiselle, Éditions du Rocher, ISBN 978-2268039589 prix de la ville d'Étretat
- 2002: Mac Orlan : l'aventurier immobile, Albin Michel, ISBN 2-226-13556-1
- 2003: Gaston Leroux ou le vrai Rouletabille. Une biographie suivie de Six histoires épouvantables, Éditions du Rocher - ISBN 978-2268047218
- 2004: Brassens, le mécréant de Dieu, Albin Michel, ISBN 2-226-15160-5
- 2006: La Comédie des livres, Albin Michel, ISBN 2-226-17216-5
- 2008: Bernard Buffet, le samouraï, Albin Michel, ISBN 978-2-226-18080-3
- 2008: Prévert, les frères amis, Albin Michel, ISBN 978-2-226-18971-4
- 2011: Et Dieu créa les femmes : Brigitte, Françoise, Annabel et les autres, Albin Michel, ISBN 978-2-226-22091-2
- 2012: Éloge du non, Monaco-Paris, France, Le Rocher, ISBN 978-2-268-07408-5
- 2013: Le Mystère de la chambre Jeanne Calment, Fayard, ISBN 978-2-213-66683-9
- 2013: Le Miroir de la Grande Guerre, Éditions Anne Carrière, ISBN 978-2-843-37723-5
- 2014: Éditeur et préfacier des mémoires posthumes de Robert Sabatier, Je vous quitte en vous embrassant bien fort, Albin Michel, ISBN 978-2-226-25689-8
- 2015: Chez Brassens. Légende d'un poète éternel, Monaco-Paris, France, Le Rocher, ISBN 978-2-268-07908-0
