= Olivier Mony =

French writer and journalist

Olivier Mony (born 27 October 1966, Bordeaux) is a French writer and journalist.

A collaborator with Livres-Hebdo, Le Figaro Magazine, Sud Ouest or Le Festin, he was a jury in the 2011 prix Françoise Sagan.

== Publications ==
- 2002: Regardez-les danser, Ballet Biarritz, with Jacques Pavlovsky and Thierry Malandain, Biarritz
- 2007: Un dimanche avec Garbo, et autres histoires, Éditions Confluences
- 2007: Du beau monde, éd. Le Festin
- 2008: Objets et saveurs du Pays basque, éd. Confluences
