= EFAP International School of Communication =

French private college

- École française des attachés de presse
- Other names: EFAP
- Motto: École des nouveaux métiers de la communication
- Motto in English: The school for new careers in communications
- Type: Private college
- Established: 1961
- Founders: Denis Huisman
- President: Amin Khiari
- Academic staff: 250
- Students: 5,000
- Location: Paris, Lyon, Bordeaux, Aix-en-Provence, Lille, Montpellier, Nice, Strasbourg, Toulouse Rennes, Miami, New York (NYIT), Shanghai (ESSCA), Santander
- Campus: Urban
- Website: Official website

EFAP, officially known as the École française des attachés de presse (in English: French School for Press Officers), is a French private college specializing in mass communication. It was founded in 1961 by French philosophy professor and writer Denis Huisman.

In 2024, the school ranked third in the Eduniversal ranking of the best bachelor's degree programs in communications in France, behind CELSA at Sorbonne University and SciencesCom at Audencia Business School. However, its master's degree program ranked 12th among the best master's programs in communications.

== History ==
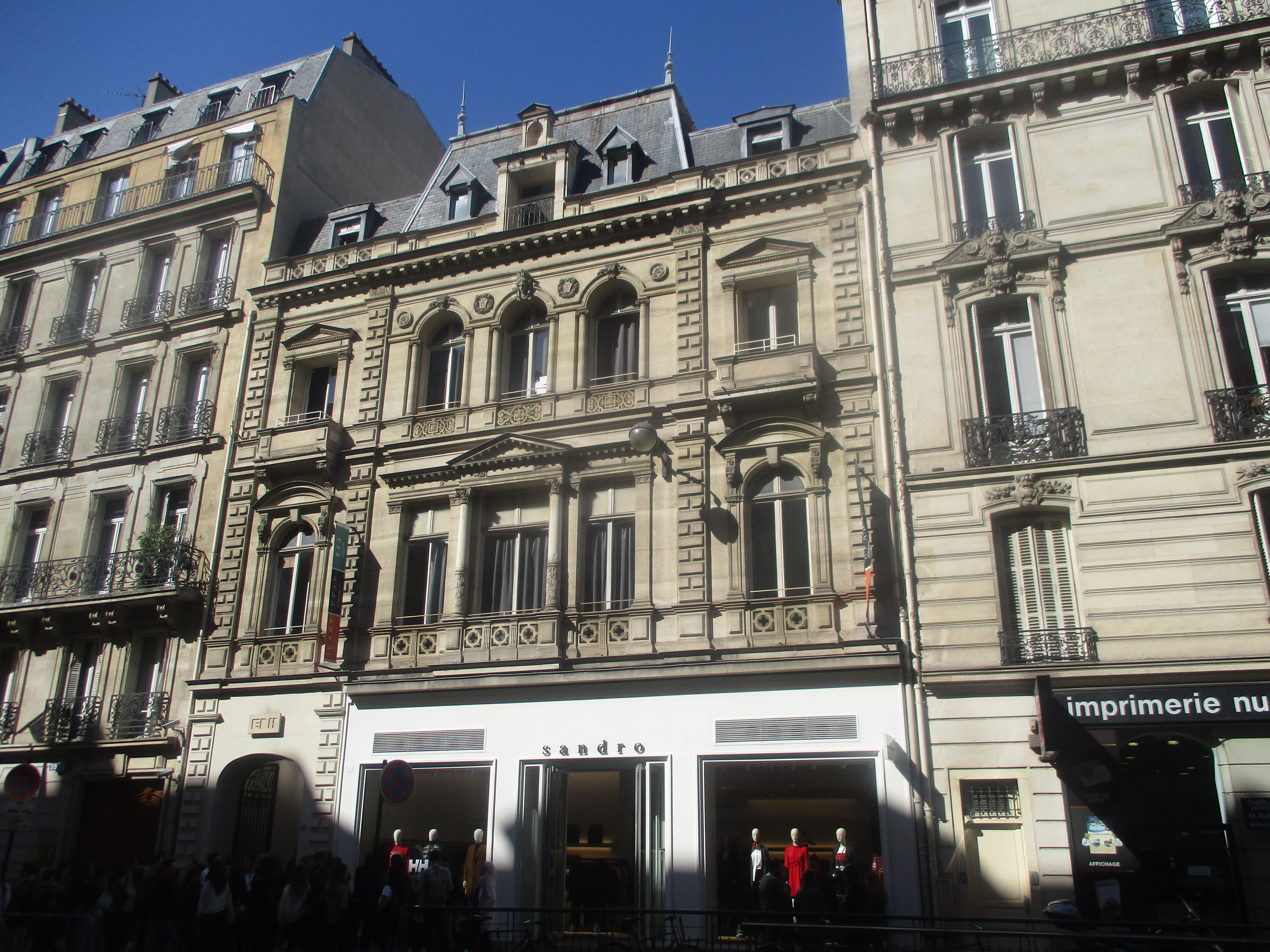
EFAP's campus in Paris, France

Originally dedicated solely to training press officers, EFAP opened up to training for all communications professions and was renamed "EFAP École des métiers de la communication" in 1981.

The school belongs to the Écoles Denis-Huisman group (EDH, created in 1991), which includes EFAP, the École française de journalisme (EFJ) and the École des métiers de la culture et du marché de l'art (ICART).

In July 2014, the Franco-British investment fund Platina Equity Solutions (80% shareholder) and Amin Khiari bought the group for over 15 million euros from its founder, 85-year-old Denis Huisman. Denis Huisman remains chairman of the supervisory board, while Amin Khiari, former managing director of the Léonard-de-Vinci cluster (2008-2010), takes over the management of the group. He immediately extended the course from 4 to 5 years and renamed the school "EFAP, l'école des nouveaux métiers de la communication".

== Teaching ==
EFAP trains for the communications professions. The school awards a Titre of Communications Manager equivalent to a Master's level, recognized by the French Government and registered in the Répertoire national des certifications professionnelles.

The school has a total of 11 campuses located in Paris, Lyon (1970), New York at the New York Institute of Technology campus (1987), Lille (1991), Bordeaux (2003), Shanghai at the ESSCA campus (2016), Aix-en-Provence (2021), Strasbourg (2021), Toulouse (2021), Montpellier (2021), Rennes (2023) and Santander, in Spain.

== Alumni ==
- Philippe Manœuvre
- Laurence Ferrari
