= 36 chandelles =

French television variety show

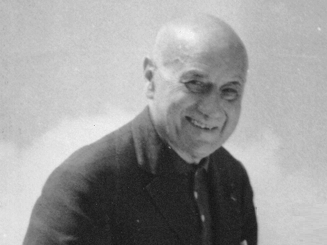
- Creator Jean Nohain
- Created by: Jean Nohain
- Country of origin: France

Original release
- Network: RTF
- Release: 27 October 1952 – July 26, 1958

36 chandelles is a French variety show which was broadcast from October 27, 1952 to July 26, 1958.

== Premise ==
Jean Nohain created the show made up of a variety of acts including musical performances, sketch comedy, magic, acrobatics, juggling, and ventriloquism for French television.

== Legacy ==
In a 1957 French film called C'est arrivé à 36 chandelles, it features the 36 chandelles as a main plot device in the movie.

== Bibliography ==
- André Leclerc, Jean Nohain, 36 chandelles, Gallimard, Paris, 1959 OCLC 43062858
