= Adélaïde de Clermont-Tonnerre =

French journalist and author

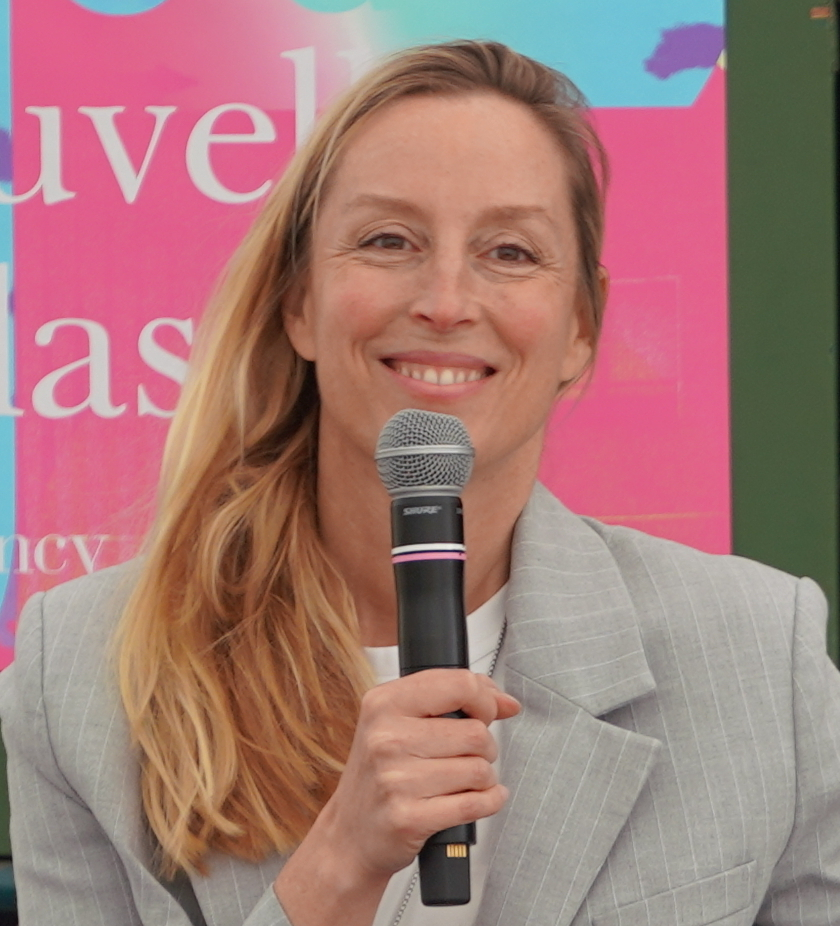
- Born: 20 March 1976 (age 50); Neuilly-sur-Seine, France
- Known for: Novelist

Adélaïde de Clermont-Tonnerre (born 20 March 1976) is a French journalist and author.

== Biography ==
Adélaïde de Clermont-Tonnerre was born in Neuilly-sur-Seine, France on 20 March 1976, a descendant of Princess Isabelle d'Orléans. She won five literary prizes for her first novel and was a finalist for the Goncourt prize for début fiction. Her second novel won the Grand Prix du Roman in 2016.

Clermont-Tonnerre attended the Ecole Normale Supérieure though she didn't complete. She worked in investment banking in France and Mexico. Clermont-Tonnerre then became a columnist and journalist, currently working as the section editor on Point de Vue.

== Works ==
- Fourrure, Éditions Stock, 2010, ISBN 9782234063389
- Le dernier des nôtres, Éditions Grasset, 2016 ISBN 978-2-246-86189-8
  - Translated by Adriana Hunter as The Last of Our Kind, Hodder & Stoughton, 2018, ISBN 978-1473658042
- Les Jours heureux, Éditions Grasset, 2021, ISBN 9782246861911
- Je voulais vivre, Éditions Grasset, 2025, EAN 9782246831662
