= Frédéric Brun (writer) =

French writer

Frédéric Brun (born 30 June 1960, Paris) is a French writer, the author of a trilogy published by Stock which earned him several literary prizes, including the prix Goncourt du premier roman for Perla, as well as the one bestowed by the "Association Écritures et Spiritualités" for Une prière pour Nacha.

== Biography ==
In 2007, he published his first book Perla. Shortly after the death of his mother, Perla, deported fifty years earlier to the Auschwitz concentration camp, he tried to understand her ordeal and read numerous testimonies about the camps. Strangely at the same moment, he felt attracted by the German poets, Novalis, Hölderlin, Friedrich Schlegel and painter Caspar David Friedrich. A hymn to the mother, it is also a book of correspondence and questioning, on love, death, birth and transmission.

In 2008, a second book was published: Le Roman de Jean. In this book, he retraces the journey of his father Jean Dréjac, author of songs, from fragments and rough drafts. After his disappearance, faced with questions about the afterlife, he finds an appeasement with the ancient philosophers.

In 2010, he completed a family trilogy with Une prière pour Nacha. Nacha has Alzheimer's disease. At the moment when he was present at the end of her life, the narrator noticed that the story of his family's branch had not been told to him. He is going to make an investigation in Poland and thanks to a Yizker-bukh, a book of memory, he would get to know some details of the life of his ancestors. Une prière pour Nacha is a book of hope at the crossroads of religions.

In 2015, he published the biographical novel Novalis et l'âme poétique du monde and created the éditions Poesis. That same year, he was a member of the Prix Françoise Sagan.

In 2016, he conceived the design, the choice of texts and the foreword of the anthology Habiter poétiquement le monde (Poesis).

== Work ==
- 2007: Perla, Stock, ISBN 9782234060272.
- 2008: Le Roman de Jean, Stock, ISBN 9782234060883.
- 2010: Une prière pour Nacha, Stock, ISBN 9782234063327.
- 2015: Novalis et l'âme poétique du monde, Poesis, ISBN 9782955211908.

Collaboration

- 2006: Jean Dréjac, Comme elle est longue à mourir ma jeunesse, éditions Christian Pirot, ISBN 2868082351.
- 2015: Poesie, réel absolu, fragments de Novalis (transl. Laurent Margantin), foreword, Poesis, ISBN 9782955211915.
- 2016: Habiter poétiquement le monde, anthologie-manifeste, Poesis, ISBN 9782955211922.

== Prizes and distinctions ==
- 2007: Perla, winner of the Prix Goncourt du Premier Roman; nominated for the Prix France Culture-Télérama and the "Bourse de la Découverte" of the Fondation Prince Pierre de Monaco.
- 2009: Perla, winner of the Prix littéraire Québec-France Marie-Claire-Blais (Québec).
- 2010: Une prière pour Nacha, winner of the Prix Écritures & Spiritualités.
- 2015: Novalis et l'âme poétique du monde, in the final selection of the Prix Femina essai
