= Voz e Suor =

Studio album by Nana Caymmi and César Camargo Mariano
- Released: 1983
- Recorded: 1983
- Genre: Música popular brasileira
- Length: 40:18
- Language: Portuguese
- Label: EMI-Odeon
- Producer: Renato Côrrea

Nana Caymmi chronology
E a Gente Nem Deu Nome (1981)	Voz e Suor (1983)	Chora Brasileira (1985)

César Camargo Mariano chronology
Todas as Teclas (1984)	Voz e Suor (1983)	Prisma (1985)

Voz e Suor is an album resulting from the partnership between Brazilian musicians Nana Caymmi and César Camargo Mariano, released in 1983 by EMI-Odeon.

== Background ==
Renato Côrrea, producer at EMI-Odeon, stated in an interview with music journalist Irlam Rocha Lima in the newspaper Correio Braziliense that recording this album was a "long-standing desire" of Nana Caymmi and César Camargo Mariano. He also stated that the repertoire was chosen by Nana and the arrangements were done by Mariano. In an interview with Elisabeth Orsini, from the Rio de Janeiro newspaper Jornal do Brasil, Nana stated that it took three months to choose the repertoire and only five days to record it.

The song Neste Mesmo Lugar has a music video.

== Promotion ==
TV Bandeirantes recorded a special show featuring Cesar Camargo Mariano and Nana Caymmi at Maksoud Plaza, in the Jardim Paulista neighborhood, with songs from the album, directed by Roberto de Oliveira. The album surpassed fifty thousand copies sold.

== Critical reception ==
The newspaper Diário de Pernambuco rated the album as "the best album of 1984." Journalist and music critic Matias José Ribeiro, writing for the Jornal Pioneiro newspaper in Rio Grande do Sul, described the album as "exceptional" and said that "Nana has confirmed once again that she is one of the greatest singers we have ever had." Arnaldo de Souteiro, from Tribuna da Imprensa, praised Nana "as one of the greatest singers in the history of the country" and compared the album to Elis & Tom by Antônio Carlos Jobim and Elis Regina, from 1974.

Manchete magazine ranked the album as the best album of the year in the Música popular brasileira and pop music categories, surpassing albums such as Simples Carinho by Angela Ro Ro and Thriller by Michael Jackson.

== Legacy ==
In a poll of the 500 greatest Brazilian albums conducted by the Discoteca Básica podcast, which featured more than 160 music experts, the album was ranked as the 387th most important album in Brazilian music. It is the only album by Nana Caymmi on the list and the only one from Cesar Camargo Mariano's solo career, who was also listed for his work São Paulo - Brasil, the result of his collaboration with Cesar Mariano & Cia.

In an interview with the television news program SBT News in 2025, journalist and music critic Regis Tadeu described the album as "completely brilliant, with incredible harmonic and melodic sensitivity," and called it a "masterpiece." Music journalist Sérgio Martins, from TV Cultura Litoral, on the program Opinião Litoral, added that the album is "one of the best voice and piano albums of all time."

== Track listing ==
No.	Title	Writer(s)	Length
1.	"Voz e Suor"	Sueli Costa, Abel Silva	03:54
2.	"Velho Piano"	Dori Caymmi, Paulo César Pinheiro	03:40
3.	"Doce Presença"	Ivan Lins, Vítor Martins	04:05
4.	"Clara Paixão"	Rosinha de Valença, Sarah Benchimol, Nonato Buzar	03:29
5.	"Neste Mesmo Lugar"	Klécius Caldas, Armando Cavalcanti	02:37
6.	"Valerá a Pena"	Dorival Caymmi	01:51
7.	"Fruta Boa"	Milton Nascimento, Fernando Brant	03:33
8.	"Isso e Aquilo"	Guilherme Rondon, Iso Fischer	02:00
9.	"Não Diga Não"	Tito Madi, Georges Henry	03:38
10.	"Sede"	Moraes Moreira	02:51
11.	"Por Toda A Minha Vida"	Antônio Carlos Jobim, Vinicius de Moraes	03:17
12.	"Nosso Tempo"	Danilo Caymmi, Claudio Nucci, Luiz Fernando Gonçalves	02:43
Total length:			40:18

== Personnel ==
The following musicians worked on this album:

- Nana Caymmi: vocal;
- César Camargo Mariano: piano, arrangement.
