= Caymmi =

Caymmi is a surname common in Brazil, especially associated with musician Dorival Caymmi and his family. People with the surname Caymmi include:

- Dorival Caymmi (1914–2008), Brazilian songwriter

His three children:

- Danilo Caymmi (b. 1948), Brazilian musician
- Dori Caymmi (b. 1943), Brazilian singer
- Nana Caymmi (1941–2025), Brazilian singer

His granddaughter:

- Alice Caymmi (b. 1990), Brazilian singer
