= Falando de Amor – Famílias Caymmi e Jobim Cantam Antônio Carlos Jobim =

2005 studio album

Falando de Amor – Caymmi and Jobim Families Sing Antônio Carlos Jobim

Studio album by Nana Caymmi, Dori Caymmi, Danilo Caymmi, Paulo Jobim, Daniel Jobim
- Released: November 17, 2005
- Recorded: 2005
- Genre: Bossa nova, MPB
- Length: 54:03
- Language: Portuguese
- Label: Sony BMG Music Entertainment
- Producer: José Milton

Falando de Amor – Famílias Caymmi e Jobim Cantam Antônio Carlos Jobim is an album released on November 17, 2005, marking a reunion of the families of musicians Antônio Carlos Jobim and Dorival Caymmi, featuring artists Nana Caymmi, Dori Caymmi, Danilo Caymmi, Paulo Jobim, and Daniel Jobim, released by Sony BMG Music Entertainment. The album is a tribute to Tom's musical work.

== Background ==
In an article by cultural journalist Irlam Rocha Lima for the newspaper Correio Braziliense, it was revealed that Nana Caymmi came up with the idea for the album, offering a new perspective on another album that brought the family together, Caymmi visita Tom from 1964. On the 1964 album, Antônio Carlos Jobim welcomed Dorival Caymmi, Dori Caymmi, Danilo Caymmi, and Nana to his home in the Ipanema neighborhood of Rio de Janeiro to record an album featuring songs by both artists. Nana, at Correio Braziliense interview, said: "I always wanted to make an album based on Tom's work. But I let time pass, to avoid that morbid post-death thing, especially because the idea was for something cheerful, upbeat".

At this gathering, Dorival Caymmi's children, Nana, Dori, and Danilo, were joined by Paulo Jobim, Tom's son, and Daniel Jobim, his grandson. Daniel Jobim revealed that the album was conceived and the songs were chosen by Nana during meetings between January and February 2005 at the home of Paulo Jobim, also in the Ipanema neighborhood in the South Zone of Rio de Janeiro. At the album launch press conference, Nana added that the tone of the album is different from other dramatic albums in her career, and that the idea behind Falando de Amor was "to be lighthearted, like motel background music".

== Critical reception ==
Journalist Luiz Fernando Vianna, writing in the newspaper Folha de S. Paulo, praised the album, giving it three stars out of five. Vianna also highlighted: "the decades-long rapport between the two families and between them and Tom's music, the CD is also more than a mere tribute thanks to some truly new gems".

Music critic and journalist Tárik de Souza wrote in the newspaper Jornal do Brasil that "the CD as a whole is great". Journalist Clara Arreguy, writing for Correio Braziliense, gave the album five stars and noted that "the result combines inspired performances by the five actors with sophisticated guitar and piano arrangements for melodies that no one composed like Tom Jobim".

== Track listing ==
Track listing
No.	Title	Writer(s)	Length
1.	"Samba do Avião" (with Dori Caymmi, Paulo Jobim, Daniel Jobim, Danilo Caymmi)	Antônio Carlos Jobim	3:09
2.	"Foi A Noite" (with Paulo Jobim)	Antônio Carlos Jobim, Newton Mendonça	2:36
3.	"Bonita Demais" (with Daniel Jobim)	Antônio Carlos Jobim, Vinicius de Moraes	3:29
4.	"As Praias Desertas" (with Nana Caymmi)	Antônio Carlos Jobim	4:02
5.	"Anos Dourados" (with Dori Caymmi)	Antônio Carlos Jobim, Chico Buarque	3:49
6.	"Outra Vez" (with Nana Caymmi)	Antônio Carlos Jobim	3:27
7.	"Desafinado" (with Paulo Jobim)	Antônio Carlos Jobim, Newton Mendonça	3:23
8.	"Esperança Perdida" (with Nana Caymmi)	Antônio Carlos Jobim, Billy Blanco	3:00
9.	"Eu Sei Que Vou Te Amar" (with Danilo Caymmi)	Antônio Carlos Jobim, Vinicius de Moraes	4:17
10.	"Só Em Teus Braços"	Antônio Carlos Jobim	3:22
11.	"Para Não Sofrer" (with Paulo Jobim, Dori Caymmi)	Antônio Carlos Jobim	2:36
12.	"Falando de Amor" (with Danilo Caymmi)	Antônio Carlos Jobim	3:40
13.	"Corcovado" (with Daniel Jobim)	Antônio Carlos Jobim	3:51
14.	"Esquecendo Você" (with Nana Caymmi)	Antônio Carlos Jobim	3:47
15.	"Canção Para Michelle" (with Nana Caymmi)	Antônio Carlos Jobim, Ronaldo Bastos	2:38
16.	"Piano Na Mangueira" (with Dori Caymmi, Paulo Jobim, Daniel Jobim, Danilo Caymmi)	Antônio Carlos Jobim, Chico Buarque	2:48
Total length:			54:03

== Personnel ==
The following musicians worked on the album:

- Dori Caymmi: guitar
- Paulo Jobim: guitar
- Daniel Jobim: piano
- Jorge Helder: bass
- Paulo Braga: drums
- Danilo Caymmi: flute
- Paulo Guimarães: flute
- Nana Caymmi: vocals
- Gordinho do Surdo: surdo, tamborim
- José Milton: production
