= Chora Brasileira =

Studio album by Nana Caymmi
- Released: March 4, 1985
- Recorded: 1985
- Genre: Música Popular Brasileira
- Length: 41:40
- Label: EMI-Odeon
- Producers: Nana Caymmi, Ronaldo Bastos

Nana Caymmi chronology
Voz e Suor (1983)	Chora Brasileira (1985)	Nana (1988)

Chora Brasileira is an album by Brazilian singer Nana Caymmi of the Brazilian popular music genre, released in 1985 by EMI-Odeon.

== Background and release ==
Rio de Janeiro singer Nana Caymmi's 15th album, Chora Brasileira, released in 1985, was arranged by her brother, Dori Caymmi, who took care of the idealization of the album. The song Chora Brasileira was composed especially for the miniseries O Tempo e o Vento, based on the work of the same name by Erico Veríssimo, shown on TV Globo.

In an interview with journalist Irlam Rocha, from the Correio Braziliense newspaper, Nana said that "I am one of the few singers in Brazil who is concerned with recording the things that remain. Who worries about re-recording the great composers of the past, about launching new and good authors."

The album was released by EMI-Odeon and was considered a bet on the continuation of the good sales and critical success of Voz e Suor, which he recorded with César Camargo Mariano.

== Tracks ==
Ref.:

No.	Title	Writer(s)	Length
1.	"Não Me Conte"	Fátima Guedes	3:40
2.	"Último Desejo"	Noel Rosa	5:01
3.	"Longe"	Danilo Caymmi, Ronaldo Bastos	4:08
4.	"Promissória"	César Camargo Mariano, Aldir Blanc, Marco Aurélio	4:28
5.	"Retrós"	Jota Maranhão, Moacyr Luz	3:40
6.	"Paralelo a Neruda"	Cláudio Cartier, Paulo César Feital	2:02
7.	"Chora Brasileira"	Fátima Guedes, Rosane Lessa, Djalma	3:10
8.	"Flor das Estradas"	Dori Caymmi, Paulo César Pinheiro	2:49
9.	"A Minha Valsa" (La Valse Des Lilas)	Michel Legrand, Eddie Barclay, Eddy Marnay, Ronaldo Bastos	2:27
10.	"Copacabana"	João de Barro, Alberto Ribeiro	4:03
11.	"Vício de Amor"	Márcio Proença, Marco Aurélio	3:20
12.	"Derradeira Primavera"	Tom Jobim, Vinicius de Moraes	2:47
Total length:			41:40

== Reception ==
André Penido wrote a favorable review of the album for the Rio newspaper Tribuna da Imprensa. André added that the album has "perfect pitch, a soft and sweet voice, a musical script and texts written by those who know what they're talking about. The arrangements are engaging and there's a great band to play them". Joaquim Ferreira dos Santos also wrote a glowing review of the work in the Jornal do Brasil. Santos noted that “it is a delightfully intimate album with few accompanying musicians, preserving the early morning atmosphere of a nightclub."

Francisco Rienzi, writing for the Santos newspaper A Tribuna, gave a mixed review of Nana's discography, stating that, up to that point, “Voz e Sour and Chora Brasileira were the only albums in her career that did not show any relaxation in her pursuit of musical notes.” Ricky, writing for the cultural newspaper O Pasquim, gave the album a mixed review, noting that: “her latest LP on Odeon features the same Nana, but she is always pleasant. It is not really one of her best albums, as it includes some weaker tracks, but the beauty of the whole still shines through.”

Paulo Macedo, writing for Jornal do Commercio, praised the album, saying that “the album is a thought-provoking invitation to introspection. Its format is cool, with some harmonic timbres such as Hélio Delmiro's guitar on the track Copacabana, a brilliant re-recording of Braguinha and Alberto Ribeiro." César Donizete, from Diário do Pará, noted that “Chora Brasileira, whose powerful and lyrical verses describe the dramatic moments at the beginning of the New Republic. This is a product that we should all treat with the utmost care and attention, because Nana Caymmi deserves a great promotional effort, consistent with her position as a fabulous interpreter of our popular music.”

== Tour ==
Nana presented the album's show, which was scripted by composer Aldir Blanc, in several cities, including Brasília, Salvador, São Paulo, and Paris.

TVE, a television channel in Rio de Janeiro, recorded a show from the album at Circo Voador, a traditional concert venue in the city of Rio de Janeiro. The broadcaster prepared the show, which featured performances by artists such as Dori and Danilo Caymmi, and Abel Silva, and added testimonials from musicians such as Beth Carvalho, Edu Lobo, Fátima Guedes, Aldir Blanc, and Ronaldo Bastos.
