= Para Caymmi, de Nana, Dori e Danilo =

Para Caymmi, de Nana, Dori e Danilo: 90 Anos

Studio album by Nana Caymmi, Dori Caymmi, and Danilo Caymmi
- Released: April 30, 2004
- Genre: MPB • Samba
- Length: 44:44
- Label: Warner Music
- Producer: Dori Caymmi

Nana Caymmi chronology
Nana Caymmi (1998)	Para Caymmi, de Nana, Dori e Danilo: 90 Anos (2004)	Até o Fim (2005)

Dori Caymmi chronology
Cinema (2000)	Para Caymmi, de Nana, Dori e Danilo: 90 Anos (2004)	Contemporâneos (2007)

Danilo Caymmi chronology
Desenhos e Palavras (2002)	Para Caymmi, de Nana, Dori e Danilo: 90 Anos (2004)	Eu, Você, Nós Dois (2005)

Para Caymmi, de Nana, Dori e Danilo: 90 Anos it is an album by Brazilian musicians Nana Caymmi, Danilo Caymmi, and Dori Caymmi, children of Bahian musician and composer Dorival Caymmi, who turned 90 on April 30, 2004, in tribute to their father.

== Background ==
With the approach of composer Dorival Caymmi's 90th birthday, his children with Stella Maris, musicians Nana, Danilo, and Dori, organized a way to honor their father's musical work. Released by Warner Music, the musicians took the CD material to Pequeri, in the interior of Minas Gerais, Stella's hometown, where her parents were traveling so they could approve the material before its release. In an interview with Rio de Janeiro newspaper Jornal do Brasil, Dori said that Dorival cried when he heard the album, “out of emotion, to our relief,” he joked during the launch press conference at a penthouse in the Botafogo neighborhood.

In celebration of the family patriarch, a DVD was also recorded at a concert held at Canecão, a traditional concert hall in Rio de Janeiro, on Dorival's 90th birthday. Dorival, the guest of honor for the evening, watched the show from one of the front tables, alongside his wife Stella. According to journalist Luiz Fernando Vianna, from the Folha de S. Paulo newspaper, due to poor health, the musician did not stay long at the concert, but he sang and waved to his children during the show. Several renowned artists attended the recording of the show, including musicians Caetano Veloso, Zeca Pagodinho, Paulo César Pinheiro, Carlos Lyra, Ronaldo Bastos, Emílio Santiago, Guilherme Araújo, writer Glória Perez, actor Luís Carlos Miele, and TV Globo executive José Bonifácio de Oliveira Sobrinho, known as Boni. The person responsible for recording the DVD was filmmaker Walter Carvalho.

== Track listing ==
=== CD ===
All tracks are written by Dorival Caymmi.

Para Caymmi, de Nana, Dori e Danilo
No.	Title	Length
1.	"Acontece Que Eu Sou Baiano"	2:47
2.	"Severo do Pão / O Samba da Minha Terra"	3:04
3.	"Vatapá"	2:50
4.	"Você Já Foi à Bahia?"	2:33
5.	"Requebre Que Eu Dou um Doce / Vestido de Bolero"	2:33
6.	"Lá Vem a Baiana"	3:01
7.	"A Vizinha do Lado / Eu Cheguei Lá"	3:24
8.	"O Que É Que a Baiana Tem"	3:31
9.	"Dois de Fevereiro / Trezentas e Sessenta e Cinco Igrejas"	4:27
10.	"Saudade da Bahia"	3:04
11.	"O Dengo Que a Nega Tem / Rosa Morena"	4:27
12.	"São Salvador"	2:52
13.	"Eu Não Tenho Onde Morar / Maracangalha"	3:03
14.	"Milagre"	3:00
Total length:		44:44

=== DVD ===
All tracks are written by Dorival Caymmi.

Para Caymmi, de Nana, Dori e Danilo
No.	Title	Length
1.	"Acontece Que Eu Sou Baiano"	3:20
2.	"Você Já Foi à Bahia?"	2:30
3.	"Saudade da Bahia"	3:01
4.	"Severo do Pão / O Samba da Minha Terra"	3:03
5.	"Promessa de Pescador"	3:18
6.	"O Bem do Mar"	3:21
7.	"Marina"	3:46
8.	"Peguei um Ita no Norte"	4:02
9.	"Festa de Rua"	3:39
10.	"Morena do Mar"	3:57
11.	"Adeus"	3:48
12.	"Requebre Que Eu Te Dou um Doce / Um Vestido de Bolero"	2:36
13.	"A Vizinha do Lado / Eu Cheguei Lá"	3:30
14.	"Eu Não Tenho Onde Morar / Maracangalha"	3:27
Total length:		47:25

== Reception ==
=== Critical ===
Journalist Tárik de Souza, writing for Jornal do Brasil, gives the album a positive review and praises “the harmonious tones of the brothers [...] where the icing on the cake is Nana's tone, counterpointed by Danilo's warmth and a somewhat defensive Dori.” Cláudio Ferreira, writing in the Correio Braziliense newspaper, gave it four stars out of five, praising the brothers' joint effort: "It's impossible to choose the best tracks. They are all magnificent. Of course, Naná is the best singer of the three—but in this work, she is at the service of an idea that is well executed as a group. The trio salutes Bahia in every way possible, always with the strength necessary to enhance the songs, but without wanting to overshadow them."

=== Prizes ===
In 2004, the album was nominated for a Latin Grammy Award. The album was nominated in the Best Samba/Pagode Album category. At a ceremony held at the Shrine Auditorium in Los Angeles, the album won the award in its category.

Year	Award	Location	Category	Result	Ref.
2004	Latin Grammy Awards	Shrine Auditorium, Los Angeles, California, United States	Best Samba/Pagode Album	Won	

== Personnel ==
The following musicians worked on the album:

- Jurim Moreira - Drums;
- Don Chacal - Percussion;
- Gordinho (Antenor Marques Filho) - Percussion;
- Dori Caymmi - Acoustic Guitar, arranger, vocal;
- João Lyra - Acoustic Guitar;
- Marcos Esguleba (Marcos Alcides da Silva) - Percussion;
- Jorjão Carvalho - Electric Bass;
- Pedro Amorim - Mandolin;
- Toni (José Antônio Azeredo Filho) - 7-String Acoustic Guitar;
- Ubirany Nascimento - Caixa (Snare Drum);
- Ronaldo do Bandolim (Ronaldo Souza Silva) - Mandolin;
- Beloba (Carlos da Silva Pinto) - Tamborim;
- Danilo Caymmi - vocal;
- Nana Caymmi - vocal.
