= Daniel Jobim =

Brazilian singer and pianist (born 1973)

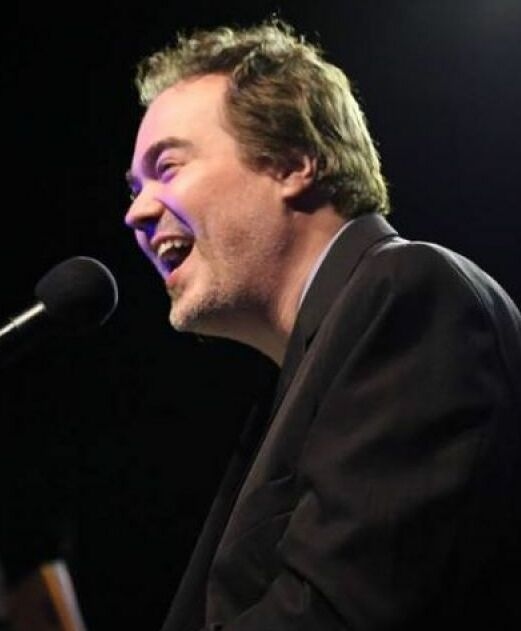
- Born: Daniel Canetti Jobim; February 23, 1973 (age 53); Rio de Janeiro, Brazil
- Occupation: Singer
- Years active: 1988–present
- Known for: Interpretation of the music of his grandfather, Tom Jobim

Daniel Canetti Jobim (born 23 February 1973) is a Brazilian singer, composer, and pianist. He is the grandson of Tom Jobim, one of the founders of bossa nova. He performs the music of his grandfather as well as Música popular brasileira (Brazilian Popular Music). His father was the guitarist Paulo Jobim.

== Early life ==
Jobim was born in Rio de Janeiro, Brazil on 23 February 1973. He began his career at the age of 15, originally just playing the piano as he was "too shy to sing". He passed the entrance exam to study geography at the Pontifical Catholic University of Rio de Janeiro but never studied there, preferring to take music lessons. In 1995, he and his father won the Grammy Award for Best Latin Jazz Album for the production of Antônio Brasileiro, by Tom Jobim, which had been released in 1994 a few days after his grandfather's death. In the same year he formed the group The Bridge with Vinnie Colaiuta, Michael Sembello, Paulinho da Costa, Nate Watts, Toshi Kubota and Dudu Falcão, releasing in 1997, in Japan and the US, an album called The Bridge.

== Career ==
In 1995 Jobim, together with his father (guitar), Jaques Morelenbaum (cello) and Paula Morelenbaum (voice), formed the Jobim Morelenbaum Quartet. The Morelenbaums had toured with Tom Jobim between 1984 and his death. The repertoire was based on his grandfather's work, with arrangements faithful to those of the composer. The quartet toured in the late 1990s and early 2000s and released an album in September 2000.

In the late 1990s, Jobim formed the Jobim Trio with his father and the drummer Paulo Braga. Paying homage to 50 years of bossa nova, the group released, in 2008, in partnership with Milton Nascimento, the CD Novas bossas, the first release on the Nascimento Music label. Alongside Nascimento, the group toured North America and Europe, which included performing at the Montreux Jazz Festival. His tribute to Jobim's work includes his participation in the album Falando de Amor – Famílias Caymmi e Jobim Cantam Antônio Carlos Jobim, with his father Paulo Jobim and Danilo, Nana, and Dori Caymmi, children of musician and friend of Jobim, Dorival Caymmi, in 2005.

In 2014, Jobim toured with a show called A Twist of Jobim that featured Lee Ritenour, Dave Grusin and Lisa Ono but he did not feature on the album of the same name. During the official opening of the Rio 2016 Summer Olympics, the model Gisele Bündchen walked across the Maracanã Stadium while Jobim sang The Girl from Ipanema. In 2017, he issued an album together with the American guitarist, John Pizzarelli, entitled Sinatra & Jobim @ 50, which celebrated the 50th anniversary of the album Francis Albert Sinatra & Antônio Carlos Jobim. The partnership gave rise to an international tour, which continued in 2018.

Jobim has also recorded with or performed alongside artists such as Dorival Caymmi, João Gilberto, Caetano Veloso, Carole Bayer Sager, Donald Fagen, Chico Buarque, Gal Costa, Roberto Carlos, Gilberto Gil, Milton Nascimento, Stevie Wonder, Sean Lennon, and Sting.

In 2018, alongside singer Maria Rita, he performed on the programme The best years of our lives, on TV Globo in Brazil. The two were performing together for the first time and sang Águas de Março (Waters of March), remembering the partnership between his grandfather and Elis Regina (mother of Maria Rita). He has also been involved in writing music for Brazilian soap operas, including Páginas da Vida.
