= Greenwich Village (film) =

1944 film by Walter Lang

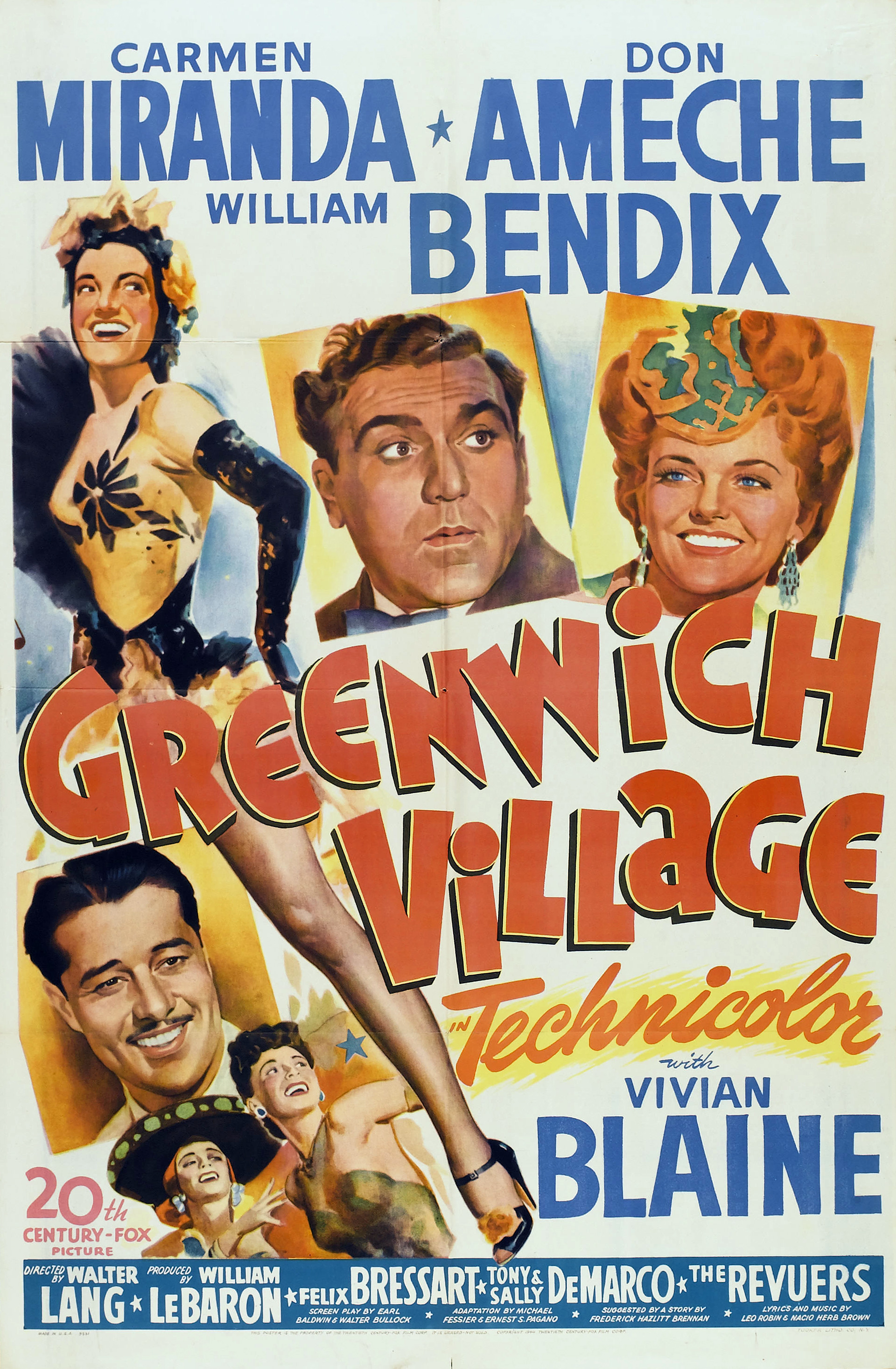
- Original theatrical movie poster
- Directed by: Walter Lang
- Screenplay by: Earl Baldwin; Walter Bullock
- Adaptation by: Michael Fessier; Ernest Pagano
- Story by: Frederick Hazlitt Brennan
- Produced by: William LeBaron
- Starring: Carmen Miranda; Don Ameche; William Bendix; Vivian Blaine
- Cinematography: Leon Shamroy; Harry Jackson
- Edited by: Robert L. Simpson
- Production company: 20th Century Fox
- Distributed by: 20th Century Fox
- Release date: September 27, 1944
- Running time: 82 minutes
- Country: United States
- Language: English
- Box office: $1,850,000

Greenwich Village is a 1944 American comedy-drama musical film from Twentieth Century Fox directed by Walter Lang. It stars Carmen Miranda and Don Ameche.

== Plot ==
In 1922, aspiring composer Kenneth Harvey travels from the Midwest to Greenwich Village, New York, where he hopes to interest famed composer Kavosky in his concerto. Kenneth wanders into a speakeasy owned by the brash Danny O'Mara, who wants to put on a musical extravaganza showcasing his singing sweetheart, Bonnie Watson. Danny hopes that the show will make Bonnie a star and make up for the fact that he cost her an opportunity of playing a leading role for Ziegfeld. Danny's other main entertainer, Princess Querida, mistakenly assumes that Kenneth is rich, although the few hundred-dollar bills he innocently flashes are the extent of his traveling money. Danny immediately targets Kenneth as a chump and begins to get friendly with him, but Bonnie disapproves and allows Kenneth to escort her home. At her apartment, Bonnie confesses that when she came to Greenwich Village, she had aspirations to become a poet, and advises Kenneth to be more careful about displaying his money. Danny, jealous of Kenneth and Bonnie's obvious attraction to each other, brings the gang up to Bonnie's apartment for a party, and Kenneth plays some of his concerto for them.

The next morning, Danny arranges for Kenneth to move to the top floor apartment and begin writing songs for their show, although Bonnie stipulates that music from Kenneth's concerto must be withdrawn from the show if Kavosky likes it. Meanwhile, Hofer, a former violinist with Kavosky's orchestra, persuades the maestro to hear Kenneth play, which Kavosky reluctantly does to get rid of Hofer. Hofer then lies to Kenneth, telling him that Kavosky wants to perform his concerto at Carnegie Hall, and that they should begin the orchestrations immediately. Kenneth works hard on his music, which he withdraws from Danny's show, even though Bonnie has already written the lyrics. Danny is infuriated, especially when he sees Bonnie and Kenneth kiss, but Bonnie is thrilled by Kenneth's seeming good fortune. Unknown to Bonnie, Danny, who continues to rehearse the numbers using Kenneth's music, is aware of the situation when Hofer swindles Danny out of his life savings, which Hofer says is the down payment on the musicians' wages for the Carnegie Hall performance. Hofer disappears with the money, and Kenneth discovers his treachery after speaking to the surprised Kavosky.

The heartbroken Kenneth is on his way home when he sees Hofer returning the money to Danny, who has realized that Bonnie is truly in love with Kenneth. The young composer misunderstands the situation and assumes that Danny and Bonnie were in on the swindle. While Kenneth is angrily packing, Querida questions him and learns of his misapprehension. She then gets him arrested by giving him some bootleg liquor to carry, and while Kenneth languishes in jail, Danny, Bonnie and the others step up their rehearsals and prepare to open the show. On opening night, Danny's right-hand man, Brophy, bails Kenneth out of jail, and the irate composer rushes over to the theater to confront Danny. As he watches from the audience, Kenneth is amazed to see Kavosky conduct his concerto, which has been turned into an elaborate number featuring Querida and Bonnie. Kenneth rushes backstage, where Danny reveals that Kavosky volunteered his services after learning of the swindle perpetrated by Hofer. Danny also advises Kenneth to make up with Bonnie, and after her final number, Kenneth embraces her in the wings.

== Cast ==
- Carmen Miranda as Princess Quereda O'Toole
- Don Ameche as Kenneth Harvey
- William Bendix as Danny O'Mara
- Vivian Blaine as Bonnie Watson
- Felix Bressart as Hofer
- The Four Step Brothers as Themselves
- Emil Rameau as Kavosky
- B. S. Pully as Brophy

== Production ==
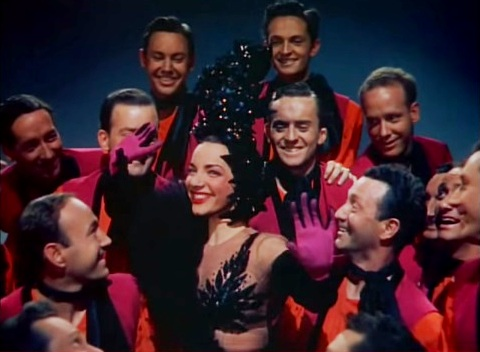
Carmen Miranda in Greenwich Village.

Information in the Twentieth Century-Fox Produced Scripts Collection, located at the UCLA Arts, indicates that Robert Ellis, Helen Logan and Valentine Davies worked on early versions of the screenplay for this picture. Their contribution to the completed film is doubtful, however.

According to news published by The Hollywood Reporter on 29 October 1942, Alice Faye and Phil Regan were originally scheduled to star in the picture. Other actors announced by The Hollywood Reporter as having been cast included Ronald Graham, Jack Oakie (who was to play "Danny O'Mara" according to studio records), Phil Baker and Perry Como (who was to make his debut in the picture).

In July 1943, The Hollywood Reporter also reported that Lillian Porter had been cast in the film, but her appearance in the completed picture has not been confirmed. Although the onscreen credits introduce actress Vivian Blaine "in Her First Featured Role," Blaine had appeared in several previous productions for Twentieth Century-Fox, including a starring role in the 1943 film Jitterbugs. According to an item published by The Hollywood Reporter on 2 November 1943, the studio placed Blaine into Greenwich Village after showing two theater audiences a test reel of Technicolor footage of Blaine, Gale Robbins, Faye Marlowe, Lois Andrews and Doris Merrick, then asking the audiences to choose their favorite.

The picture marked the screen debut of The Revuers, a cabaret group featuring Judy Holliday (who is billed as Judith Tuvim on the CBCS), Betty Comden, Adolph Green and Alvin Hammer. Although news published by The Hollywood Reporter indicated that The Revuers' "satiric sketch of a Shubert operetta" had been purchased by the studio for their debut, the sequence was cut from the finished picture, and modern sources note that the group appears only in the party scene at "Bonnie Watson's" apartment. After the group broke up, Holliday became a well-known Broadway and motion picture comedian and won an Academy Award for Best Actress for Born Yesterday. Comden and Green became a popular songwriting team whose films included Singin' in the Rain and On the Town. Actor Felix Bressart was borrowed from MGM for the production.

According to information in the film's file in the MPAA/PCA Collection at the AMPAS Library, the Production Code Administration initially rejected the screenplay due to "sustained scenes of excessive and unnecessary drinking and drunkenness." The romantic leads even humorously break the code rule of unintentionally sharing a bed on screen - albeit fully clothed and hungover.

A news report published by The Hollywood Reporter in November 1942 noted that songwriter Leo Robin was teamed with Nacio Herb Brown to compose the film's songs after Robin's longtime collaborator, Ralph Rainger, died in a plane crash on 23 October 1942.

In a 27 October 1943 The Hollywood Reporter news item listing songs that were to be included in the film, the Robin and Brown songs "I'm Down to My Last Dream," "You Make Me Mad," "Oh, Brother," "Never Before," "That Thing They Sing About," "I've Been Smiling in My Sleep" and "I Have to See You Privately" were mentioned, but none of these titles were in the completed picture. Carmen Miranda's rendition of "Give Me a Band and a Bandana" includes excerpts from "O Que e que a baiana tem?" by Dorival Caymmi and "Quando eu penso na baia" by Ary Barroso.

== Critical reception ==
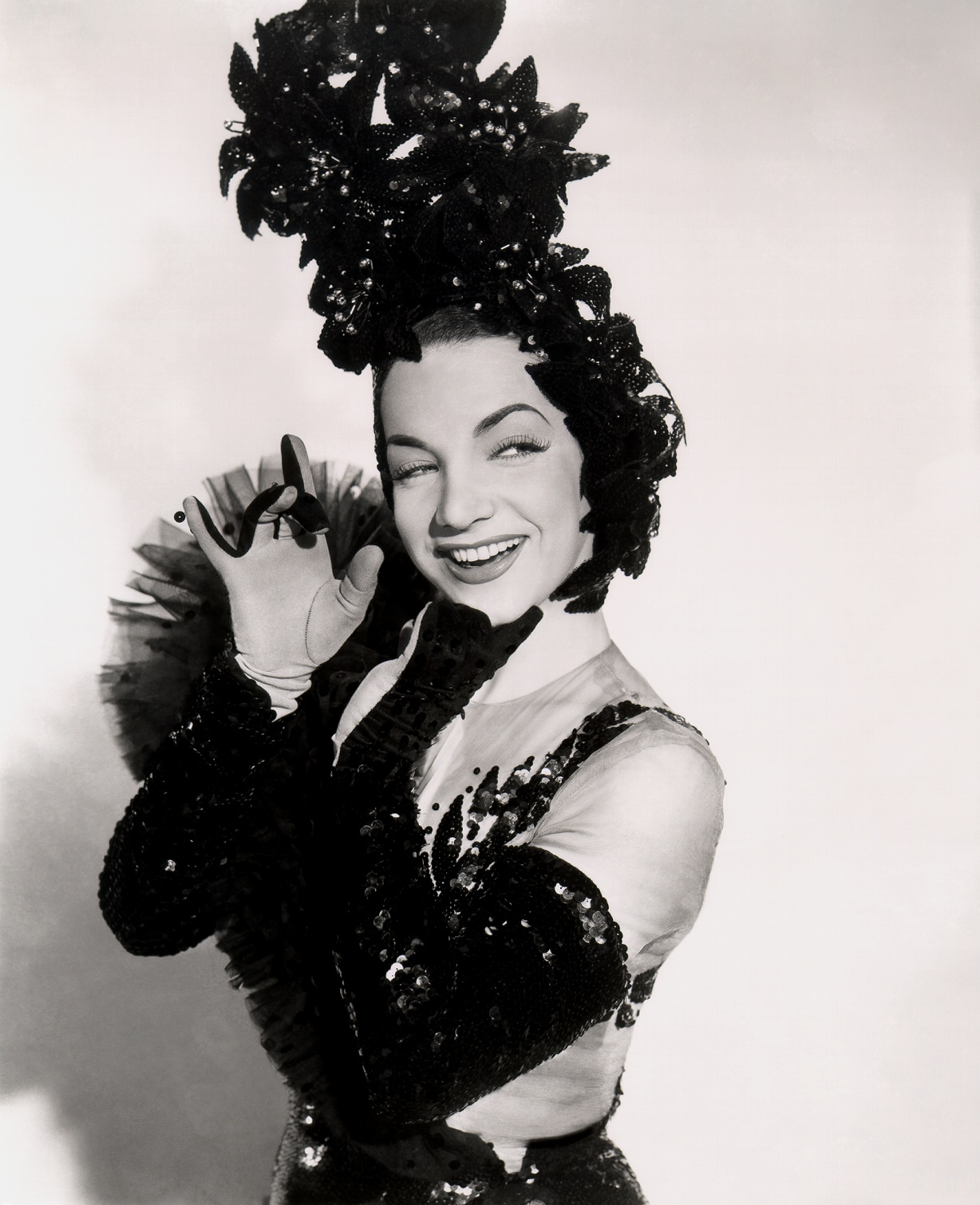
Carmen Miranda in a publicity photo for the movie.

Bosley Crowther's review, published in the New York Times about Greenwich Village, describes the film as a lackluster musical production that struggles against the odds due to a combination of weak material and an average cast. The main attraction of the film is its Technicolor, while the plot is noted as soft and lacking significant surprises. Crowther points out that the cast fails to elevate the film with any sense of grandeur. Don Ameche is criticized for lacking the presence of a musical lead, Vivian Blaine is seen as lacking both the voice and style of a star, and William Bendix is described as "slow" in his role as a shop owner. Carmen Miranda, meanwhile, repeats her formula with flashy costumes and Latin numbers, while the film uses many old songs as a backdrop, but without much impact. The review concludes that Greenwich Village is a production lacking confidence, with a cast that cannot lift the film and a plot that seems more like an excuse to showcase musical numbers that lack relevance or innovation.

Peggy Simmonds' review from The Miami News reflects a mixed tone of appreciation and disappointment. Simmonds acknowledges that the film is helped by the use of Technicolor and Carmen Miranda's presence, but laments that the production doesn't do justice to the actress's talent. The review suggests that, despite the lack of good lines for Carmen, as seen in her previous films, she still manages to stand out whenever she appears on screen. However, the overall effect of the film is considered disappointing, as the production fails to capitalize on the star's potential, and the film's material isn't strong enough to compensate for these shortcomings.

Time's review complained that the cast was hardly formidable enough to sustain a movie with such thin plot and characters. Bendix had recently become a star supporting player and had already perfected a screen persona of a lovable doofus. Time magazine's review of Greenwich Village marveled at how the persona was just that; in real life, apparently, Bendix was cultivated and mannered. "Bendix is probably the world's highest-paid professional ignoramus," said Time. "As such he now rates star billing at his studio and makes more money than the President of the U.S."

Film historian Jeanine Basinger discusses Carmen Miranda's peak popularity during the time Greenwich Village was released, following her iconic role in The Gang's All Here (1943). Basinger describes Miranda not as a traditional movie star, but as a performer who delivered memorable "star turns" in films, serving as a significant escape fantasy during World War II. Known for her extravagant costumes, fruit-filled headpieces, and high-energy performances, Miranda's style was delightfully exaggerated.

== Home media ==
The film was released on DVD in June 2008 as part of Fox's "The Carmen Miranda Collection."

== See also ==
- List of American films of 1944
