= Paulo Braga =

Brazilian drummer (born 1942)

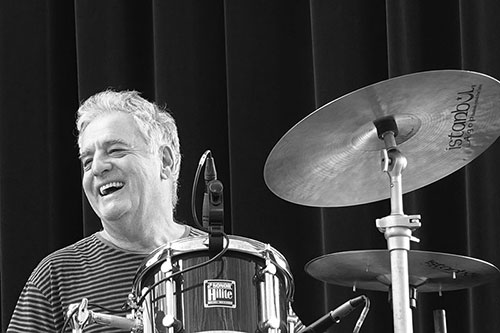
- Born: November 24, 1942; Guarani, Minas Gerais, Brazil
- Other names: Paulinho Braga
- Occupation: Musician
- Known for: Drummer for Bossa Nova and Música popular brasileira performers

Paulo Braga or Paulinho Braga (born 24 November 1942) is a Brazilian drummer and composer. He is considered an innovator in modern Brazilian drumming and one of Brazil's leading drummers, said by some to be the "father of modern Brazilian drums". He is best known for his long period playing with the "founder of bossa nova", Tom Jobim. Braga is said to have recorded more than 900 music tracks.

== Career ==
Braga was born on 24 November 1942 in Guarani in the state of Minas Gerais, later moving to the state capital, Belo Horizonte and then to Rio de Janeiro. In the 1960s he was a member of the Berimbau Trio, alongside Milton Nascimento (who was a double bass player at the time) and Wagner Tiso (pianist), playing in nightclubs in Belo Horizonte. Later, he joined pianist Antonio Adolfo's ensemble A Brazuca.

During the 1970s Braga was part of the band that accompanied the singer Elis Regina, when he "brought to traditional carioca samba influences from jazz, soul and funk", using "minimalism in the art of accompanying". During this period, he also worked as a studio musician, recording with Tim Maia, Milton Nascimento, Beth Carvalho, Raul Seixas, Rita Lee, Carlos Lyra, Emílio Santiago, MPB4, Sueli Costa, Nara Leão, Taiguara, Chico Buarque, Gal Costa, Djavan, Raimundo Fagner, Jards Macalé, Gilberto Gil, and Ivan Lins. He was also part of the group Som Imaginário with Nascimento as the vocalist.

Braga began playing with Tom Jobim in 1974, for the duet that the composer formed with Elis Regina in Los Angeles, which led to the LP Elis & Tom. Braga would record with Jobim again in 1981, on the album Edu & Tom, a duet with Jobim and Edu Lobo. Four years later, Jobim formed Banda Nova. Braga was a member from its formation until the death of Jobim in 1994, playing in world tours and on recordings. In 1995 he moved to the US, where he played with musicians such as Joe Henderson, Pat Metheny, David Sanborn, Michael Brecker and Gil Goldstein. With Henderson he was a drummer on some of the tracks of the albums Double Rainbow: The Music of Antonio Carlos Jobim and Big Band. He also played with the Thelonious Monk Institute of Jazz All-Star Band. Other albums he played on included Uri Caine in Rio and Bossa Nova by John Pizzarelli.

In 2003, Braga released his first solo album with his own compositions, Grooveland. Two years later, beginning to divide his time between New York and Brazil, he became a member of the Jobim Trio, together with Paulo Jobim (guitar) and Daniel Jobim (piano), son and grandson of Tom Jobim. He released his second solo CD in 2006. In 2008, the Jobim Trio teamed up with Nascimento on a project that culminated in the album Novas Bossas, released in the same year, to honour 50 years of Bossa Nova. In 2009, this CD won the Brazilian Music Award as the best MPB (Música popular brasileira) recording of the year.
