= Poesia Musicada =

Studio album by Dori Caymmi
- Released: 21 November 2011
- Recorded: 2011
- Genre: Brazilian, Latin Jazz, Bossa Nova
- Length: 42:28
- Label: MusicTaste
- Producer: Dori Caymmi

Poesia Musicada is a 2011 studio album by Brazilian artist Dori Caymmi. The album is a tribute to his father, Dorival Caymmi, as well as a celebratory landmark of 42 years with his songwriting partner, Brazilian poet Paulo César Pinheiro.

== Track listing ==
No.	Title	Length
1.	"Marinheiragem"	2:16
2.	"Estrela de Cinco Pontas"	4:20
3.	"Rede"	3:12
4.	"Dona Iemanjá"	3:05
5.	"Violeiro"	4:18
6.	"Projeto de Vida"	3:15
7.	"Vereda"	2:35
8.	"Canto Praieiro"	4:10
9.	"Velho do Mar"	3:16
10.	"Barco"	2:45
11.	"Estrela Verde"	3:20
12.	"Música No Ar"	3:00
13.	"Estrela Polar"	2:56

All songs written by Dori Caymmi and Paulo César Pinheiro. Produced by Dori Caymmi.
