= Lisa Ono =

Japanese-Brazilian bossa nova singer

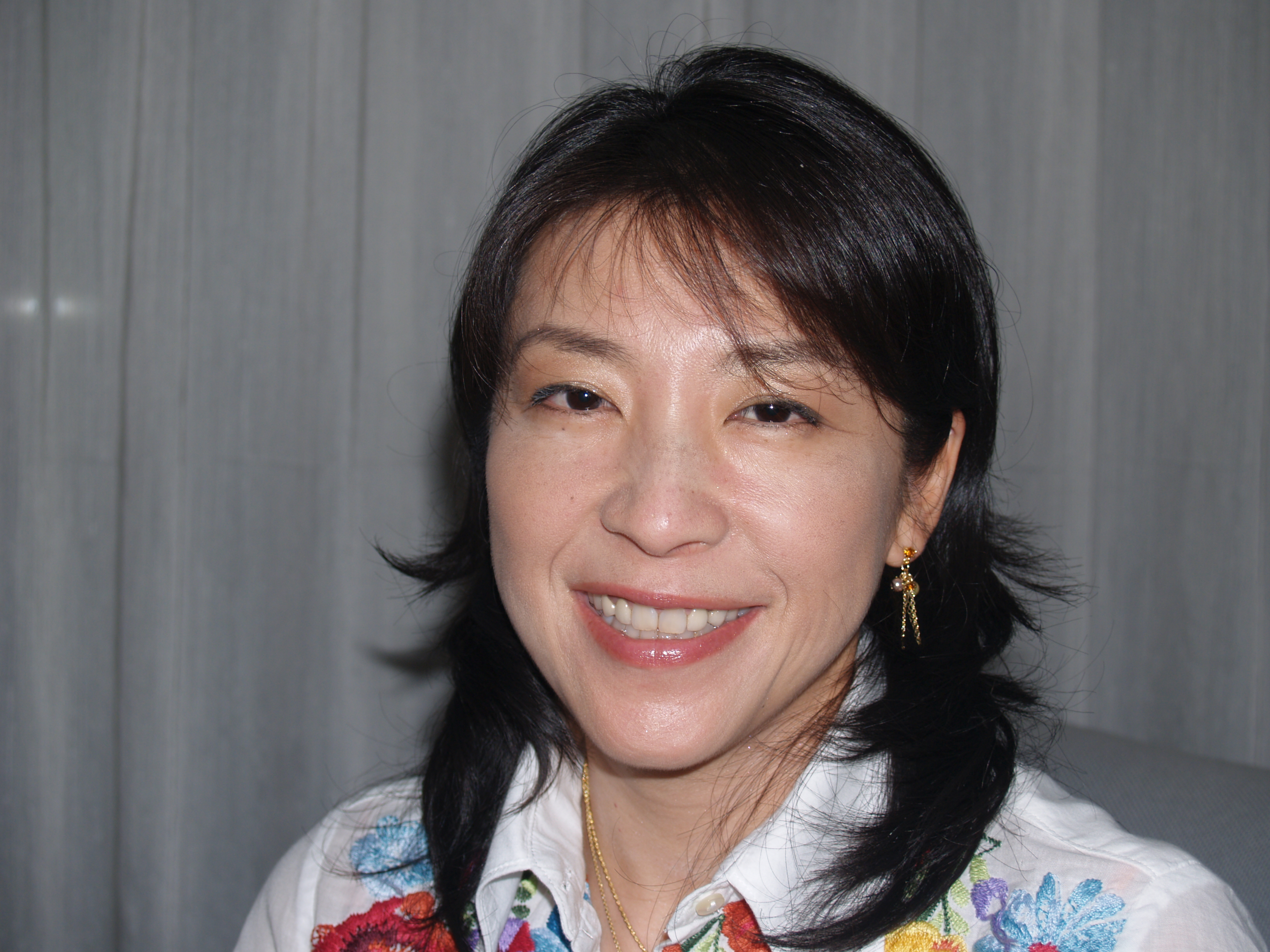
- Ono in 2005

Background information
- Born: Lisa Ono; 29 July 1962 (age 64); São Paulo, Brazil
- Genres: Bossa nova
- Occupation: Singer
- Instruments: Voice, guitar
- Years active: 1989–present
- Labels: MIDI (1989–1990); BMG (1990–1996); EMI (1996–2006); Avex Trax/Dois Irmaos (2006–2011); DREAMUSIC (2011–)

Lisa Ono (小野リサ; born 29 July 1962) is a Japanese-Brazilian bossa nova singer.

== Life ==
Lisa Ono was born in São Paulo, Brazil, in 1962 but moved with her family to Tokyo at the age of 10. From that time on she spent half of every year in Japan and half in Rio de Janeiro, Brazil. Apart from her native Portuguese and Japanese, she can also speak English, Spanish and French.

Although she lived in Brazil for only a short time, she was turned into a type of "MPB (Brazilian popular music) ambassador" in Japan, influenced by her father, who owned a club while living in Brazil and was also Baden Powell's agent.

Lisa began singing and playing the guitar at age 15 and her debut as a professional Bossa Nova singer was in 1989. Her natural voice, rhythmic guitar playing, and her charming smile led her to a huge success and popularized Bossa Nova in Japan. She has performed with many top musicians such as Antônio Carlos Jobim and João Donato and has been performing enthusiastically in New York City, Brazil and Asian countries. The 1999 album Dream sold more than two hundred thousand copies in Japan and since then she has established a determined position in the Japanese Bossa Nova community.

== Career ==
After moving to Japan, Lisa's father opened a new venue called Saci-Pererê, a Brazilian restaurant where she started performing mainly bossa nova and samba. Besides singing, Lisa Ono plays the guitar and is a songwriter. Her first album, Catupiry, was released in 1989. She has not stopped recording since then, releasing one disc a year, mostly in Portuguese. She soon became famous in Japan after appearing in several TV commercials.

In 1991 her album Nanã won the "Grand Prix Gold Disk Award for Jazz" in Japan. Her third album Menina was recorded in Rio de Janeiro, and won the same Grand Prix award. In 1992, Ono released her second album on the BMG label called Serenata Carioca, and she also released her first book Felicidade. In 1994 she released Esperança, with guest appearances by Tom Jobim, Sivuca, Paulo Moura, Danilo Caymmi and Mario Adnet. In 1993, she made Minha Saudade, dedicated to works by João Donato, who also wrote the arrangements. In 1996, Antonio Adolfo co-produced her CD Rio Bossa. In 1998, Ono released the album Bossa Carioca, produced by Paulo and Daniel Jobim. She also started a label, Nanã, aimed at promoting Brazilian music in Japan.

In 1999, Oscar Castro-Neves co-produced her CD Dream, which sold over 200,000 copies. This album was made in America, and contains classic American songs and film music from the 1940s–50s done with bossa nova arrangements. In July 2000, Ono continued her exploration of songs in English with the release of Pretty World, co-produced by Eumir Deodato.

In the fall of 2000 she released Boas Festas, a "winter bossa" album to celebrate the Christmas season. The album includes original tunes as well as fresh bossa arrangements of classic American Christmas carols. Continuing her exploration of new material, in the summer of 2001, Lisa released Bossa Hula Nova, which as the title name implies, includes some new and classic Hawaiian songs done in a bossa nova style. This album includes arrangements by Mario Adnet, who appears on many of her recordings. In March 2002, Lisa released Lisa Ono Best 1997–2001. This album also includes two wonderful new live songs recorded on Lisa's "winter bossa" tour in December 2001. In July 2002, Lisa released Questa Bossa Mia (This Is My Bossa Nova). This CD features a new musical destination – Italy! Mario Adnet is once again involved.

In 2003 she released the album Dans Mon Île (French for "In my island"), themed around a voyage to France and based on famous French songs. Joining her once again is the Brazilian composer and arranger Mario Adnet. Guest musicians include Pierre Barouh, Richard Galliano, and Henri Salvador, who also performs a duet with Lisa on "J'ai Vu". In the summer of 2004, Lisa released NAIMA-meu anjo, a collection of African and Arabic songs done in a bossa nova style. In November 2004, Lisa released her newest CD Boas Festas 2 – Feliz Natal. On this album Lisa returns to Brazil with a new "winter bossa" collection of Christmas songs in English and Portuguese recorded with three of Brazil's top guitarists – Toninho Horta, Oscar Castro-Neves, and Romero Lubambo.

Lisa announced the birth of her second child, a boy, on 7 October 2004.

Lisa has performed with Tom Jobim and with João Donato in Brazil, in addition to other performances around the world. Appearances in Japan include concerts at the Blue Note Tokyo with Paulo and Daniel Jobim, Toninho Horta, and Emílio Santiago.

In addition to making guest appearances on other recordings, Lisa has also created music for television commercials in Japan.

As of November 2007, she has released 22 albums.

In 2009, from January to April, Ono held her Asian tour from Beijing, Shanghai, Hong Kong, Taipei, to Bangkok. On 4 March 2009, her two new albums, Cheek To Cheek – Jazz Standards from RIO – and Look To The Rainbow – Jazz Standards from L.A. – were released at the same time. The theme of both albums is jazz music, and features producers/arrangers from Brazil (Mario Adnet) and Los Angeles (Bill Cantos). In May 2009, Lisa started Lisa Ono Concert Tour 2009 – Jazz Standards -, a tour to celebrate her two new albums.

In August 2012, Ono served on the judging panel of a Chinese singing-survival show Asian Wave which was broadcast on Dragon Television from 5 September.

In March 2019, her song Sway It, Hula Girl from the album Bossa Hula Nova was sampled on Freddie Dredd's song Cha Cha, which subsequently became popular on the short form video app TikTok.

== Discography ==
- 1989.10.21 – CATUPIRY (MIDI)
- 1990.04.21 – NaNã
- 1991.07.21 – menina (BMG)
- 1992.06.21 – SERENATA CARIOCA
- 1993.01.21 – Namorada
- 1994.06.22 – Esperanca
- 1995.04.21 – Minha Saudade
- 1996.11.21 – RIO BOSSA
- 1997.11.19 – ESSENCIA
- 1997 – Amigos
- 1998.07.16 – BOSSA CARIOCA
- 1999.06.23 – DREAM
- 2000.07.05 – Pretty World
- 2000.11.16 – Boas Festas
- 2001.07.11 – Bossa Hula Nova
- 2002.07.10 – Questa Bossa Mia...
- 2003.07.16 – DANS MON ILE
- 2004.06.23 – NAIMA～meu anjo～
- 2004.11.17 – Boas Festas2～Feliz Natal～
- 2005.06.29 – Romance Latino vol.1
- 2005.07.27 – Romance Latino vol.2
- 2005.08.24 – Romance Latino vol.3
- 2006.07.12 – Jambalaya -Bossa Americana-
- 2007.07.11 – Soul & Bossa
- 2007.11.21 – Music Of Antonio Carlos Jobim: Ipanema
- 2009.03.04 – Cheek To Cheek -Jazz Standards from RIO
- 2009.03.04 – Look To The Rainbow – Jazz Standards from L.A
- 2010.03.05 – ASIA
- 2011.10.26 – Japão
- 2013.06.19 – Japão2
- 2014.05.21 – Brasil
- 2014.09.14 – Japao 3
- 2015.07.01 – My Favorite Songs
- 2016.04.26 – Dancing Bossa
- 2017.06.07 - GIOPIO

== Collections ==
- 1991.11.21 – O Melhor De Lisa (MIDI)
- 1997.06.28 – AMIGOS
- 1998.06.24 – Selecao (BMG)
- 2000.02.23 – Colecao～the collection
- 2002.03.06 – Ono Lisa Best 1997–2001 (EMI)
- 2005.12.07 – Romance Latino Selection
- 2008.05.21 – Ono Lisa Best 2002–2006 (EMI)
- 2008.05.21 – Ono Lisa Best 1989–1996 (MIDI, BMG)
- 2021.05.10 _ Lisa Ono: #BeefBeefChallenge
- 2021.08.29 _ Lisa Onds!! ( EMI )

== See also ==
- Bossa nova
