= Suíte do Pescador =

Song by Dorival Caymmi

Song by Dorival Caymmi
- Written: Dorival Caymmi
- Released: 1957

External audio
- Original version on YouTube
- Russian version by Neschastny Sluchai band on YouTube

"Suíte do Pescador" ("The Suite of a Fisherman" in Portuguese, also known as "Canção da Partida") is a song by Brazilian songwriter Dorival Caymmi, written in 1957. In 1965 a closely similar version of the song, titled "Marcha dos Pescadores" ("March of the Fishermen"), was released. The song appears in the opening and in the end of The Sandpit Generals film (which also stars Caymmi, among others). "Suíte do Pescador" was performed particularly by Nara Leão in 1965 and Maria Bethânia in 1999. The Brazilian band Zarabatana performed a jazz version of the song.

In 1972, Acker Bilk performed this song under the title of "Pescadores" as part of the album Acker Bilk, His Clarinet & Strings.

"Suíte do Pescador", performed by music group Akkord in the 1970s with Russian lyrics by Yuri Tseytlin, became popular in the Soviet Union and then in Russia (as performed by music band Neschastny Sluchai in 1998).

== Themes ==
The original Portuguese lyrics revolves around a fisherman, who goes out to sea on a raft and hopes to return home safe.

The Russian lyrics tells the story of an orphaned slum boy and is topically related to the plot of The Sandpit Generals.
