= Fátima Guedes =

Brazilian singer and composer (born 1958)

- Born: 6 May 1958 (age 68); Rio de Janeiro, Brazil
- Genres: MPB
- Occupations: Composer, singer
- Years active: 1973-present
- Labels: Rob Digital, Dabliú Discos, Velas

Fatima Guedes (Rio de Janeiro, May 6, 1958) is a Brazilian singer and composer. She began composing at 15 years old, and won first place at the 1973 Festival de Música da Faculdade Hélio Alonso, with her song "Passional." Her songs have been recorded by Elis Regina, Maria Bethânia, Simone, Ney Matogrosso, among others.

She has also appeared in two short films, Shadows of the Past (2012), and Strike (2010).

== Biography ==
She began her compositional career in 1973, and three years later, her song "Passional" won first place in the Festival de Música da Faculdade Hélio Alonso. Her song "Onze Fitas" (1978) was recorded by Elis Regina in her end of the year special and was a part of the soundtrack for the play O dia da caça by José Louzeiro. She signed with the recording company Odeon in 1979, who released her first three albums.

Her first radio hit was "Mais uma boca" (1980), which competed in the Festival MPB/Shell. The album Coração de louca (1988) was one of the pioneers of the independent label Velas, which was released three years later by the duo Ivan Lins/Vitor Martins. The three subsequent albums would also be released: Pra bom entendedor... (1993), Grande tempo (1995), which had two songs nominated for the Sharp Awards in 1996 in the MPB category, and Muito intensa (1999).

Various singers have Fátima Guedes' songs in their repertoire, including Simone, Maria Bethânia, Jane Duboc, Joanna, Zizi Possi, Mônica Salmaso, Leila Pinheiro, Ney Matogrosso, and Nana Caymmi. The following songs stand out among her many compositions: "Flor de ir embora," "Condenados," "As pessoas," "Pelo cansaço," "Muito intensa," "Absinto," "Eu," "Lápis de cor," "Chora brasileira," "Onze fitas," "Arco íris," "Passional," "Cheiro de mato," "A vida que a gente leva," "Mais uma boca," "Ar puro," "A bailarina," among others.

She released the CD Outros tons in 2006, containing only forgotten songs by Tom Jobim.

== Discography ==
- 1979 — Fátima Guedes
- 1980 — Fátima Guedes
- 1981 — Lápis de Cor
- 1983 — Muito prazer
- 1985 — Sétima arte
- 1988 — Coração de louca
- 1993 — Pra bom entendedor...
- 1995 — Grande tempo
- 1997 — A Música Brasileira Deste Século Por Seus Autores e Intérpretes - Fátima Guedes (SESC-SP, 1997)
- 1999 — Muito intensa
- 2001 — Luzes da mesma luz — with Eduardo Gudin
- 2005 — Odeon 100 Anos 3
- 2006 — Outros Tons
- 2007 — Betrayos Me
- 2011 — Ao Vivo - Alaíde Costa & Fátima Guedes
- 2015 — Transparente

== See also ==
- Chora Brasileira
