= Paulo Jobim =

Brazilian guitarist and composer (1950–2022)

- Born: Paulo Hermanny Jobim; August 4, 1950; Rio de Janeiro, Brazil
- Died: 4 November 2022 (aged 72); Gávea, Rio de Janeiro
- Occupation: Guitarist
- Years active: 1980–2022
- Known for: Interpretation of the music of his father Tom Jobim; composition and arranging
- Children: three, including Daniel Jobim

Paulo Hermanny Jobim (4 August 1950 – 4 November 2022) was a Brazilian singer, guitarist, flutist, arranger, environmentalist, and architect. He was the son of the "founder of bossa nova", Tom Jobim (1927–1994) and father of pianist Daniel Jobim.

== Early life ==
Jobim was born in Rio de Janeiro on 4 August 1950, the first child of Antônio Carlos Jobim and Tereza Hermanny Jobim. From a young age he inherited from his parents a commitment to musical studies, learning to play a wide range of instruments. This variety of instruments, the emerging musical trends at the time, such as the bossa nova, and the famous musicians with whom he came into contact, enriched his repertoire, and led him to play and compose with other great names in Brazilian music. He worked for a period as an architect, having a degree in architecture from the Faculty of Architecture and Urban Planning at the Universidade Santa Úrsula in Rio de Janeiro, but eventually chose to dedicate himself to music.

Jobim studied with a variety of teachers covering piano, guitar, theory, flute, harmony, composition, film scoring, and contemporary music. His teachers included César Guerra-Peixe and Don Sebesky.

== Career ==
Jobim performed with his father as well as working as a musician and arranger for performers such as Milton Nascimento, Chico Buarque, Sarah Vaughan, Astrud Gilberto and Lisa Ono, accompanying them on tours overseas. He also worked as a composer and arranger for cinema and television soundtracks. From 1985 to 1994 he was part of Tom Jobim's Banda Nova, with which he performed in shows throughout Brazil and abroad, and recorded the albums Passarim, O tempo e o vento, Família Jobim, Antonio Brasileiro and Tom Jobim: unprecedented. Other performers with the band included Jaques Morelenbaum (cello), Danilo Caymmi (flute and voice), Tião Neto (bass), and a vocal quintet formed by Paula Morelenbaum, Maucha Adnet, Ana Jobim, Elizabeth Jobim and Simone Caymmi.

In 1995, he founded, together with his son Daniel Jobim (piano and voice), Jaques Morelenbaum (cello) and Paula Morelenbaum (voice), the Quarteto Jobim Morelenbaum, with which he released, in 1999, the CD Quarteto Jobim Morelenbaum. In 2000 and 2001, he was responsible for the general coordination, arrangements and musical direction of Cancioneiro Jobim (published in six volumes), which includes a biography and the transcription of the complete works of Tom Jobim (around 220 songs).

In 2002, he conceived and produced, together with Mario Adnet, the Jobim Sinfônico project, containing all of Tom Jobim's orchestral pieces. The show was held in São Paulo with the São Paulo State Symphony Orchestra, conducted by the Brazilian conductor Roberto Minczuk, with the participation of Milton Nascimento. In 2005, with Nana, Dori e Danilo Caymmi, along with his son Daniel, released the album Falando de Amor – Famílias Caymmi e Jobim Cantam Antônio Carlos Jobim, in tribute to the work of Tom Jobim. In 2006, together with his son, Daniel, and Paulo Braga, he formed the Jobim Trio to celebrate his father's repertoire. In 2021 the Trio joined Jaques Morelenbaum and singer Roberta Sá to present a show called Chega de Saudade, the name of a song by Tom Jobim and Vinicius de Moraes.

Jobim inherited from his father a concern to preserve the environment, which led him to support projects that help to preserve areas in places like Chapada dos Guimarães in Mato Grosso state. He was a founder of the Antônio Carlos Jobim Institute, which since 2001 has been working to preserve and make available to the public, especially students and researchers, the musical and poetic work of Tom Jobim as well as his concern for the preservation of Brazil's nature. It also implements projects to catalogue, conserve and make available the collections of artists who it considers represent, like Jobim, the best values of Brazil. These include Dorival Caymmi, Chico Buarque, Gilberto Gil, Paulo Moura, Milton Nascimento and Marieta Severo.

== Death ==
Jobim died on 4 November 2022 in the Hospital São Vicente in Gávea in Rio de Janeiro, having had bladder cancer for a decade. He had three children, including the pianist Daniel Jobim.
