= O Que É Que A Baiana Tem? =

Song

"O que é que a baiana tem?"
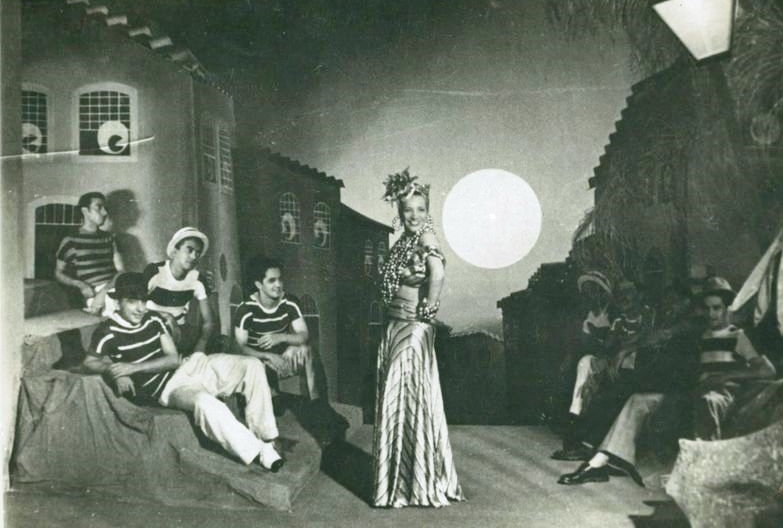
- Carmen Miranda wearing a baiana costume in a scene from Banana da Terra, produced by the Sonofilmes studio.

Song by Carmen Miranda
- Language: Portuguese
- English title: What does the woman from Bahia have?
- Released: April 1939
- Genre: Samba
- Label: Odeon (Brazil); Decca (U.S.)
- Songwriter: Dorival Caymmi

O Que É Que A Baiana Tem? in Banana da Terra

O que é que a baiana tem? (English: What does the woman from Bahia have?) is a song composed by Dorival Caymmi in 1939 and recorded by Carmen Miranda.

The song was immortalized in the voice of the Brazilian artist Carmen Miranda, who played this samba in the film Banana da Terra (1939), directed by Ruy Costa. Besides the film Banana da Terra, "O que é que a baiana tem?" was presented by Miranda in the Broadway musical revue The Streets of Paris between 1939 and 1940, and in the movie Greenwich Village (1944).

== Cultural references ==
From the beginning of his career, Dorival Caymmi musically imbued his country with a rhythmic, romantic identity that went well with Brazil's enticing geography and sultry, bikini-clad women. His first and immediately popular song, written at 16, was “O Que É Que a Baiana Tem?”. That song became the first hit of Carmen Miranda, whose well-displayed limbs, extravagant hats and exuberant voice made her a global sensation as the "Brazilian Bombshell". In 1996, the publication News From Brazil said Mr. Caymmi taught Ms. Miranda to move her arms and hands with the music, which became her trademark.

In keeping with the song's lyrics, Carmen performs "O que é que a baiana tem?" wearing the costume of the baiana, a term which literally means a woman from the north-eastern state of Bahia but more specifically refers to Afro-Brazilian woman who since colonial times have sold food on the streets of Salvador in Bahia and Rio de Janeiro, and to the priestesses of the Afro-Brazilian religion, Candomblé. Carmen, who had worked as an apprentice milliner and was a skilled dressmaker, stylized the costume herself, adding sequins and a small imitation basket of fruit to her turban, in a playful nod to the baskets of produce that the baiana street vendors carried on their heads. This stylized version of the baiana costume, with a shortened blouse that exposed her midriff, a figure-hugging, bias-cut, full-length skirt (eschewing the traditional baianas more respectable white lace blouse and hooped underskirts), and most memorably an elaborately decorated turban, was to become Carmen's iconic trademark for international audiences. The costumes created for her first Hollywood roles, like those she wore on Broadway and in nightclub acts in the United States, would incorporate the same key elements.

== Legacy ==
In 2009, the recording was selected for preservation in the Library of Congress. The music helped to introduce both the samba rhythm, as well as Carmen Miranda to American audiences. Daniela Mercury sings this song on her 2009 album "Canibalia", which includes a sample of Miranda's original recording.
