= Nana, Tom, Vinicius =

Studio album by Nana Caymmi
- Released: June 15, 2020
- Recorded: Rio de Janeiro, Rio de Janeiro, Brazil
- Genre: Bossa nova, Música popular brasileira
- Label: SESC-SP
- Producer: Dori Caymmi

Nana Caymmi chronology
Nana Caymmi Canta Tito Madi (2019)	Nana, Tom, Vinicius (2020)

Nana, Tom, Vinicius is an album by Brazilian singer Nana Caymmi, released in 2020 by the SESC-SP label. The album features Nana Caymmi performing songs by composers Tom Jobim and Vinicius de Moraes.

== Album ==
Released in 2020 on digital platforms and CD by SESC-SP, the album features Brazilian singer Nana Caymmi performing songs by composers Tom Jobim and Vinicius de Moraes. The album includes contributions from musicians Dori Caymmi, Jorge Helder, Jurim Moreira, Teco Cardoso, Daniel Allain, and Itamar Assiere.

In an interview to the newspaper O Estado de S. Paulo, Nana Caymmi expressed regret that the album did not lead to a tour due to the impact of the COVID-19 pandemic in Brazil.

== Track listing ==
No.	Title	Writer(s)	Length
1.	"Eu Sei que Vou Te Amar"	Vinicius de Moraes, Tom Jobim	3:45
2.	"Sem você"	Vinicius de Moraes, Tom Jobim	4:37
3.	"Luciana"	Vinicius de Moraes, Tom Jobim	2:00
4.	"As praias desertas"	Tom Jobim	3:52
5.	"Janelas abertas"	Tom Jobim	3:57
6.	"Serenata do adeus"	Vinicius de Moraes	2:51
7.	"Valsa de Eurídice"	Vinicius de Moraes	3:47
8.	"Modinha"	Vinicius de Moraes, Tom Jobim	3:15
9.	"Por toda minha vida"	Vinicius de Moraes, Tom Jobim	2:17
10.	"Canção do amor demais"	Vinicius de Moraes, Tom Jobim	3:21
11.	"Soneto da separação"	Vinicius de Moraes, Tom Jobim	3:23
12.	"Se todos fossem iguais a você"	Vinicius de Moraes, Tom Jobim	2:58
Total length:			38:00

== Reception ==
=== Critical ===
Journalist and music critic Mauro Ferreira wrote in his blog on G1: "While the album may sound old-fashioned or even predictable on one hand, on the other it sounds absolutely sublime because everything in Nana, Tom, Vinicius is of exceptional quality that will remain eternally brilliant, above the musical standards of all eras," giving the album five stars.

=== Accolades ===
The album was nominated at the 22nd Latin Grammy Awards, being nominated for Album of the Year. The winner of the night was Panamanian musician Rubén Blades with his album Salswing!.

Awards and nominations
Year	Award	Location	Category	Result	Ref.
2021	Latin Grammy Awards	United States	Album of the Year	Nominated	

== Personnel ==
- Dori Caymmi, guitar
- J Helder, bass
- Juroreira, drums
- Itamar Assiere, piano
- Daniel Allain, flute
- Teco Cardoso, flute
