= Caymmi visita Tom =

Studio album by Dorival Caymmi and Antônio Carlos Jobim
- Released: 1964
- Recorded: 1964
- Studio: Tom Jobim's residence in Ipanema, Rio de Janeiro
- Genre: Bossa nova; Música popular brasileira; Jazz
- Length: 28:48
- Label: Elenco
- Producer: Aloysio de Oliveira

Dorival Caymmi and Antônio Carlos Jobim chronology
Caymmi visita Tom (1964)	Caymmi and the Girls From Bahia (1965)

Dorival Caymmi chronology
Eu não tenho onde morar (1960)	Caymmi visita Tom (1964)	Caymmi and the Girls From Bahia (1965)

Antônio Carlos Jobim chronology
The Composer of Desafinado, Plays (1964)	Caymmi visita Tom (1964)	A Certain Mr. Jobim (1965)

Professional ratings
Review scores
Source	Rating
AllMusic	4.5/5 stars

Caymmi visita Tom is a bossa nova album released in 1964. It is the result of a partnership between musicians Antônio Carlos Jobim and Dorival Caymmi.

== Record ==
The album was recorded for Elenco, an important Brazilian music label based in Rio de Janeiro. The recording began after Antônio Carlos Jobim returned to Brazil after a period spent in the United States. The recording occurred at the Carioca musician's residence at Barão da Torre Street #107 in the Ipanema neighborhood. Dorival took his three children to participate in the recording of the album: Nana, Dori and Danilo Caymmi.

The recording featured musicians Sérgio Barroso on double bass and Edison Machado and Dom Um Romão on drums. The production was carried out by Aloysio de Oliveira.

== Track listing ==
No.	Title	Writer(s)	Performer(s)	Length
1.	"...Das rosas"	Pixinguinha, Otávio de Sousa	Dorival Caymmi	3:11
2.	"Só tinha de ser com você"	Antônio Carlos Jobim, Aloysio de Oliveira	Antônio Carlos Jobim	3:28
3.	"Inútil paisagem"	Antônio Carlos Jobim, Ray Gilbert, Aloysio de Oliveira	Dorival Caymmi, Nana Caymmi, Antônio Carlos Jobim	3:20
4.	"Vai de vez"	Roberto Menescal, Lula Freire	Danilo Caymmi, Dori Caymmi, Edison Machado, Sergio Barrozo, Antônio Carlos Jobim	3:20
5.	"Canção da noiva"	Dorival Caymmi	Stela Caymmi	1:59
6.	"Saudade da Bahia"	Dorival Caymmi, Antônio Carlos Jobim	Dorival Caymmi	3:14
7.	"Tristeza de nós dois"	Bebeto Castilho, Durval Ferreira, Maurício Einhorn	Nana Caymmi	3:36
8.	"Berimbau"	Baden Powell, Vinicius de Moraes	Danilo Caymmi, Dori Caymmi, Edison Machado, Sergio Barrozo, Antônio Carlos Jobim	5:02
9.	"Sem você"	Antônio Carlos Jobim, Vinicius de Moraes	Nana Caymmi	2:51
Total length:				28:48
