= Kicking Cans =

Studio album by Dori Caymmi
- Released: 1993
- Label: Qwest
- Producer: Dori Caymmi

Dori Caymmi chronology
Brazilian Serenata (1991)	Kicking Cans (1993)	Dori Caymmi: 2 Em 1 (1994)

Kicking Cans is an album by the Brazilian musician Dori Caymmi, released in 1993. "Brasil (Aquarela Do Brasil)", featuring Herbie Hancock, was nominated for a Grammy Award for "Best Jazz Instrumental Solo".

== Production ==
Kicking Cans was produced by Caymmi. Herbie Hancock, Billy Childs, and John Patitucci contributed to the album. Branford Marsalis played a saxophone solo on "Migration". Caymmi, who wrote eight of the album's songs, scats on the title track.

== Critical reception ==
Professional ratings
Review scores
Source	Rating
AllMusic	3/5 stars
MusicHound World: The Essential Album Guide	4.5/5 stars

The Los Angeles Times wrote that "throughout the recording, Caymmi's intimate voice and romantic guitar establish a haunting presence." The Sun-Sentinel determined that "Caymmi exquisitely showcases his feathery voice, which hovers gracefully over sumptuous, spacious Brazilian-flavored jazz arrangements." The Huntsville Times noted that "Caymmi's signature sound is his soft, floating tenor, accented by sparkles of his acoustic guitar."

The Virginian-Pilot called Caymmi "a versatile, consistently inventive tunesmith ... to his credit, he has shown no tendency to contemporize his sound with modernistic cliches." The Pittsburgh Post-Gazette stated that "Caymmi's chanting vocals ride on a wave of melodic acoustic guitar and light percussion, a style common to northeast Brazil." The Lewiston Tribune deemed Caymmi "silken and sublime," writing that "the songs are expressions of moods and feelings not defined by words."

AllMusic wrote that "the shifting time signatures and skewed melodies conspire to keep the listener comfortably off balance—the music goes where it has to go, like a river meandering lazily through a rain forest."

== Track listing ==
No.	Title	Length
1.	"Migration"
2.	"Forever Lover and Friend"
3.	"It's Raining (At Buriti Farm)"
4.	"From the Sea"
5.	"Brasil (Aquarela do Brasil)"
6.	"Kicking Cans"
7.	"Spring"
8.	"Northeast"
9.	"Hurricane Country"
10.	"My Countryside"
