= Influências =

2001 album by Dori Caymmi

Studio album by Dori Caymmi
- Released: 2001
- Genre: Música Popular Brasileira
- Label: Trauma Records

Dori Caymmi chronology
Cinema: a Romantic Vision (1999)	Influências (2001)	Contemporâneos (2003)

Influências is a Latin Grammy Award-nominated album by Brazilian musician Dori Caymmi, released in 2001. The album was nominated for Best MPB (Música Popular Brasileira) Album at the 2002 Latin Grammys. Some of the songs in the album pay homage to his father - "La Vem A Baiana" and "Acontece Que Es Sou Baiana".

== Track listing ==
1. "Conversa de Botequim" (with Gal Costa)
2. "Faceira"
3. "Linda Flor (Yayá) (Ai, Yoyô)"
4. "Cor Do Pecado"
5. "Pé Do Lageiro" (with Dominguinhos)
6. "Serenata Do Adeus"
7. "Lá Vem Baiana"
8. "Copacabana"
9. "Acontece Que Eu Sou Baiano"
10. "É Doce Morrer No Mar"
11. "Berimbau"
12. "A felicidade"
13. "Desafinado"
14. "Migalhas de Amor"
15. "Clair de Lune"
