= The Sandpit Generals =

1971 film by Hall Bartlett

- Directed by: Hall Bartlett
- Written by: Hall Bartlett; Jorge Amado
- Produced by: Hall Bartlett
- Starring: Juarez Santalvo
- Cinematography: Ricardo Aronovich
- Release date: July 1971
- Running time: 102 minutes
- Country: United States
- Language: English

The Sandpit Generals (also released as The Defiant and The Wild Pack) is a 1971 drama film directed by Hall Bartlett. Its plot is based on the novel Captains of the Sands by Jorge Amado. Melodious soundtracks were written by Dorival Caymmi.

The film was not popular in the United States due to its socialist context and was banned by Brazil's military regime for the same reason, but became an iconic film in the Soviet Union, where it took part in the 7th Moscow International Film Festival and, although did not win any prize, in a few years was widely distributed in movie theaters and was proclaimed "the best foreign film" by Komsomolskaya Pravda newspaper in 1974.

In the socialist country, the movie became so well-known that it inspired theater plays, books, special reports on post-Soviet criminal youth, etc.

== Plot ==
The film features a street gang of poor homeless youth struggling for existence in Brazil. After letting a girl with her little brother settle in their beach shelter, the gang's inner spirit is gradually reformed as she brings a sense of love and family into their shabby abode. One of the local priests helps the gang at the cost of his clergy career. Police eventually capture the main characters and after their lengthy stay in prison, the girl is terminally ill. Her sudden death is a culmination of the movie, it urges the gang to fight for their rights against the government.

== Cast ==
- Juarez Santalvo
- Freddie Gedeon as Almiro
- Ademir da Silva as Big John
- Guilherme Lamounier as The Cat
- Eliana Pittman as Dalvah
- Dorival Caymmi as John Adam
- Peter Nielsen as Lollipop
- Mark De Vries as Dry Turn
- Butch Patrick as No Legs
- John Rubinstein as Professor
- Tisha Sterling as Dora
- Kent Lane as Bullet

== See also ==
- List of American films of 1971
- List of hood films
