= Edison Machado =

- Born: Edison dos Santos Machado; January 31, 1934; Rio de Janeiro, Engenho Novo, Brazil
- Died: September 15, 1990 (aged 56) Rio de Janeiro, Brazil
- Genres: Jazz, Samba, Bossa Nova
- Occupations: Composer; Drummer
- Instrument: Drums
- Years active: 1949–1990

Edison dos Santos Machado (January 31, 1934 – September 15, 1990) was a self-taught Brazilian drummer and composer. Through his creation of the samba no prato (samba on the cymbals) and his early recordings, he helped shape Brazilian samba and bossa nova. Throughout his life, he collaborated frequently with a variety of musicians including Chet Baker and Ron Carter and was recorded in over 50 albums until his sudden death in 1990. Despite the impact he made as one of the founders of bossa nova his name has been largely forgotten.

== Biography ==
=== Early life and career beginnings: 1934–1957 ===
Edison Machado grew up in the suburbs of Engenho Novo of the then capital of Brazil, Rio de Janeiro. In his childhood, he started to teach himself how to play the drums. In watching and listening to famous Brazilian drummers such as Luciano Perrone and Edgar Nunes Rocca he would follow along drumming on his legs to learn their techniques. In the years after World War II Machado, like many other adolescents in Brazil, experienced the heyday of Rádio Nacional and was inspired by American be-bop jazz drummers Art Blakey and Max Roach. In 1949 at the age of 17 While continuing to play the drums Machado would go onto accidentally create a play style that would go onto influence modern samba. What occurred was that whilst playing with a samba band, Machado's snare drum broke. Not wanting to disrupt the flow of the music, he proceeded to play on the ride cymbal with his right hand, while he using his left hand to add syncopated accents on a tom drum. After his accidental creation of samba no prato, it would become Machado's signature play style in the years to come.

At some point in the early 1950s, Machado joined the Brazilian Army and in doing so meet Raul de Souza. By around 1955, Machado had left the army and was playing at the Beco das Garrafas clubs which was also known as "Bottles Alley". The location renowned for hosting many famous Brazilian jazz artists throughout the 50s and it got its nickname due to neighbouring apartments throwing bottles into the alley to protest all the noise from the performers. These clubs where well known for its having new innovative musicians of which played every night. In 1957 at the age of 23, Machado would join his first major group Turma da Gafieira which went onto record their first albums Turma da Gafieira and Samba em Hi-Fi in the same year.

=== Career success: 1957–1980 ===
In the years after playing with Turma da Gafieira, Machado went continue building a reputation for himself collaborating with Dionysio de Oliveira Filho, Paulo Moura and Luiz Bonfá. By 1961 Machado, went onto help create a group called the Bossa Três which was one of the first instrumental Bossa Nova groups of the time. Consisting of Luiz Carlos Vinhas on piano and Tião Neto on the double bass the group went onto debut at the Lane in 1962. By the start of 1963, the group were playing in New York under a contract from Sidney Frey, the owner of Audio-Fidelity. Frey went onto record multiple sessions to sell to the American music market, advertise them on the Andy Williams Show and to feature them at the Village Vanguard. Despite the Bossa Três' relative success, they missed opportunities to play at venues like Birdland because Machado was not able to read music due to being self-taught.

== Discography ==
=== As leader/co-leader ===
- 1964: Edison Machado é Samba novo
- 1970: Obras
- 1971: Obras 2
- 1989: Edi

With Bossa Três

- 1963: Os Bossa Três
- 1963: Bossa Três and Jo Basile
- 1965: Bossa Três e amigos
- 1965: Bossa Três Em Forma!

With Bossa Três and Pery Ribeiro

- 1966: Encontro

With Rio 65 Trio

- 1965: Rio 65 Trio
- 1966: A Hora E Vez Da M.P.M.

=== Compilations ===
1966: Love, Strings and Jobim

=== As sideman ===
With Turma da Gafieira

- 1957: Turma da Gafieira
- 1957: Samba em Hi-Fi

With Paulo Moura

- 1958: Escolha E Dance

With Dionísio e Seu Quinteto

- 1959: Romance no Texas Bar
- 1959: Sax & Ritmo

With Luiz Bonfá

- 1962: O Violão E O Samba

With Antônio Carlos Jobim

- 1963: The Composer of Desafinado Plays

With Meirelles e os Copa 5

- 1964: O Novo Som

With Hector Costita

- 1964: Impacto

With Salvador Trio

- 1965: Salvador Trio
- 1966: Tristeza

With Stan Getz

- 1966: Stan Getz with Guest Artist Laurindo Almeida

With Tania Maria

- 1969: Apresentamos

With Ron Carter

- 1981: Patrão

With Gene Bertoncini & Michael Moore

- 1986: O Grande Amor

== Filmography ==
- 1964: Entranced Earth (credited as Edson Machado)
- 1965: Crónica da Cidade Amada
