= Paulo César Pinheiro =

Brazilian poet and composer (born 1949)

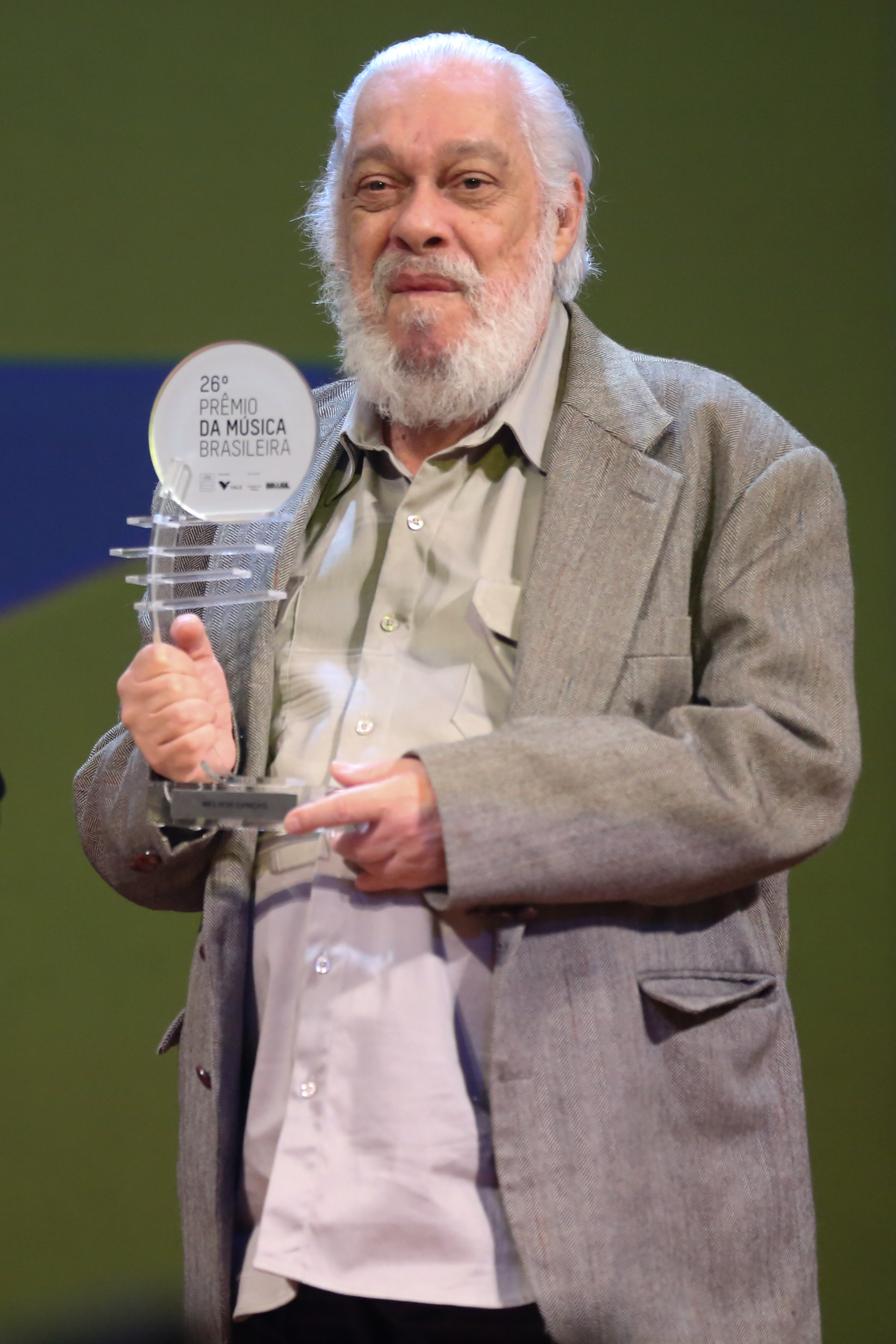
- Born: 28 April 1949; Rio de Janeiro City, Rio de Janeiro, Brazil
- Occupations: Poet, composer, lyricist

Paulo César Pinheiro (born 28 April 1949) is a Brazilian poet and composer. One of the best poets of Musica Popular Brasileira, he wrote lyrics for a great number of songs for some of the best-known entertainers in Brazil. Among his collaborators have been João Nogueira, João de Aquino, Francis Hime, Dori Caymmi, Antônio Carlos Jobim, Ivan Lins, Edu Lobo, Mauro Duarte, Guinga, Baden Powell de Aquino, Toquinho, Eduardo Gudin e Maria Bethânia.

== Discography ==
- Poesia Musicada (2011) - album by Dori Caymmi to celebrate 42 years working with Paulo César Pinheiro
- Capoeira De Besouro (June 2010)
- O Lamento do Samba (2003)
- Tudo o que mais nos uniu - Eduardo Gudin, Márcia e Paulo César Pinheiro (1996)
- Parceria - João Nogueira e Paulo César Pinheiro - Ao Vivo (1994)
- Afros e Afoxés da Bahia (1989)
- Poemas Escolhidos (1983)
- O importante é que a nossa emoção sobreviva n. 2 (1976)
- O importante é que a nossa emoção sobreviva (1975)

== Books ==
- Canto Brasileiro (1973)
- Viola Morena (1984)
- Atabaques, Violas e Bambus (2000)
- Clave de Sal
- Pontal do Pilar (2009)
