= Correio Braziliense =

Brazilian newspaper

- Type: Daily newspaper
- Owner: Diários Associados
- Founder: Assis Chateaubriand
- Editor: Ana Dubeux
- Founded: 21 April 1960; 66 years ago
- Language: Brazilian Portuguese
- Headquarters: SIG/Sul, Quadra 2, Lote 340, Setor de Indústrias Gráficas, Brasília, DF
- Country: Brazil
- Website: www.correiobraziliense.com.br

The Correio Braziliense (in English, Mail of Brasília, after the archaic demonym) is a daily newspaper in Brazil. The paper was first published on 21 April 1960. Its founder was Assis Chateaubriand. The paper has its headquarters in Brasília.

The name came from the historical Correio Braziliense, published in London from 1808 to 1822 by Hipólito José da Costa, a Liberal Brazilian exile. It was the first newspaper of Brasilia, born together with the new federal capital on 21 April 1960. The inaugural edition totaled 108 pages, most of them in the notebook commemorating the inauguration of the city.

In making the decision to build a city that would become the new capital of the Republic, displacing it from Rio de Janeiro, President Juscelino Kubitschek obtained from the owner of the Associated Diaries, Assis Chateaubriand, skeptical of the magnitude of the project, the promise that if the work was carried out at the scheduled time would have accompanied it, recording the birth, a newspaper of his chain. The new newspaper would in fact become the main printed diary of the Chain of Associated Diaries.

The circulation of Correio Braziliense, which in 1963 was 1,500 copies, reached 24,500 copies in 1969. In the 1980s, the increase in the capital's population was accompanied by an increase in the newspaper's circulation, which exceeded 30,000 daily copies. In 2008, the average daily circulation reached 53,000 copies, reaching an average of 92,000 copies on Sundays, according to the Circulation Verifiable Institute (IVC). The Braziliense Post thus consolidated its position as the main newspaper of Brasilia, became the largest circulation daily in the Midwest and became among the 20 daily newspapers of the largest circulation in Brazil.

The proposal to occupy the space in a market that was still nascent and that would expand over the years was accompanied by an identification between the newspaper and the city of Brasilia. Initially, issues related to the fixing of the new capital were highlighted in the pages of the Post. Later, topics such as preservation and changes in the city's urban project and issues related to the increase in population, such as housing problems and the city's traffic, would be highlighted. The weight of civil servants in the economy and politics of the capital was replicated by the emphasis attributed to matters related to functionalism, which made up an important segment of the newspaper's readers.

Throughout its history, Correio Braziliense has oscillated between maintaining the local character and seeking to be among the main brazilian daily newspapers. The relationship with the daily life of the city of Brasília and, especially after the 2009 reform, with the daily life of the other cities of the Federal District (which together have approximately twice the population of Brasília), is an important part of the newspaper's identity. At the same time, the fact that it was located in the capital of the country made it a prominent presence in federal public agencies and among parliamentarians. The proximity to the daily politics in the capital and to sources (techniques and policies) of the federal government made the political news differentiated from that of other Brazilian newspapers with local profile. In 1988, when the highlight among the news was going to work in the Constituent, the newspaper created its own news agency, the News Agency of the Associated Diaries (Anda). The agency had correspondents in several capitals of the country and its material circulated among the organs of the Associated Diaries.

Some of the notable episodes in the recent political trajectory of the Post, however, were related to conflicts or approximations with the local politics of the Federal District. The removal of journalist Ricardo Noblat from the position of editor in 2002 was linked to the polarization of district politics, especially during the 1990s, among former governors Joaquim Roriz, who was governor of the Brazilian Democratic Movement Party (PMDB), and Cristovam Buarque, who ruled by the Workers' Party (PT).

The first major reform of Correio Braziliense took place in 1976 and was conducted by journalist Evandro de Oliveira Bastos, who took over the head of the newsroom in place of Ari Cunha. The reform of 1976 was motivated by the growth of Jornal de Brasília, Correio's main competitor in the capital. It was also from this moment that the division of tasks in the writing was accentuated, guided by a greater specialization of the subjects and a clearer delimitation among the editorials, following changes that occurred in Brazilian journalism. The 1980s would be marked by the change of direction of journalism, which would pass to journalist Ronaldo Junqueira (1982-1990). The position would later pass into the hands of journalists Luis Adolfo (1990-1993), Ricardo Noblat (1993-2002) and Josemar Gimenez, who took over the editorial board from 2002, accumulating this position in correio and minas state, a daily newspaper of Belo Horizonte that is also part of the chain of Associated Diaries. The death of Edilson Cid Varela, who has been director of the company since the 1960s, led journalist Paulo Cabral to the business direction of correio and printed new guidelines to the newspaper, with an accentuation of business concerns in the definition of journalistic routines. Paulo Cabral held the presidency of the Stock Condominium of Diários Associados for 22 years, until his death in 2009. The graphic and editorial reforms carried out since the 1990s, especially in 1996, yielded visibility to Correio Braziliense and the main award of the Society for News Design, the World's Best Designed Paper, in 1998. The 1996 reform introduced new notebooks, such as Sports, Vehicles, Informatics and Tourism, and modified the newspaper's visual identity. Since then, the Post has undergone three more reforms. The one in 2000, like the one in 1996, was made by Ricardo Noblat. The last two, from 2003 and 2009, were coordinated by Josemar Gimenez, who replaced Noblat in the writing direction. The 2009 reform presented a series of modifications, including the expansion of the Cidades notebook (which has been circulating in the newspaper since 1990) and the intention to reinforce the newspaper's information portal on the Internet, establishing a greater interactivity with readers, according to the current trend of the national and international print media.

The internet news and services page went on the air in 1996. Since then, it has undergone several reforms and name changes. Born as correiobraziliense.com.br, it became correioweb.com.br in 1997, and since then the two versions. Since April 2008, the first address has been presented as the newspaper's content portal. Throughout its existence, Correio Braziliense has received several important awards from national and international journalism. By 2008, the newspaper had received 14 Esso journalism awards and 84 Awards from the Society for News Design, in addition to the Embratel, Ayrton Senna, Vladimir Herzog, Ethos and Amigo da Criança Journalist awards (from the Children's Rights News Agency, Andi), among others.
