= Dori Caymmi =

Brazilian musical artist (born 1943)

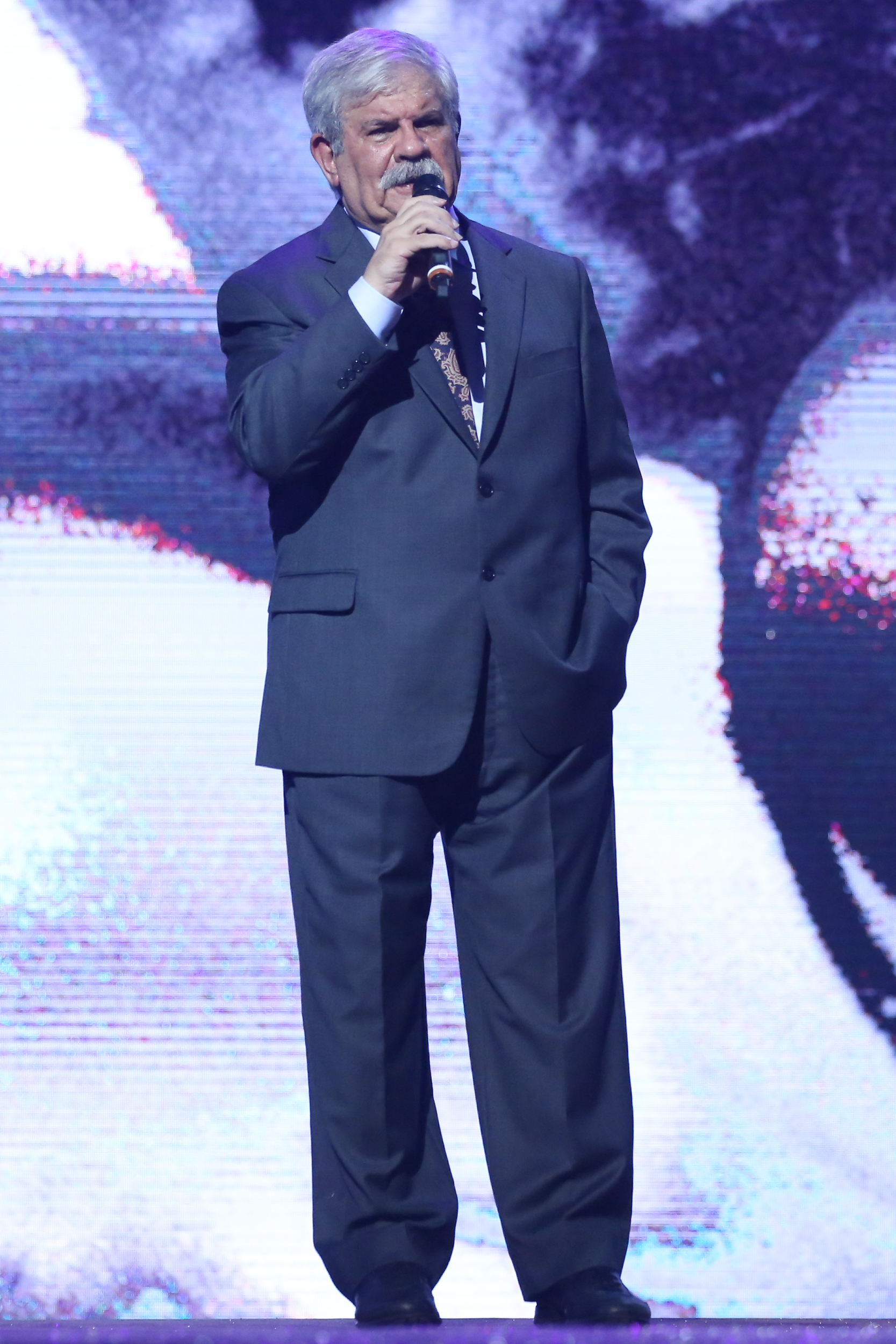

Background information
- Born: Dorival Tostes Caymmi; 26 August 1943 (age 83); Rio de Janeiro, Brazil
- Genres: Latin jazz, bossa nova, MPB
- Occupations: Singer, songwriter, musician, arranger, conductor
- Instruments: Guitar, vocals
- Years active: 1960–present
- Labels: Elektra, Qwest, Zebra, MusicTaste
- Website: www.doricaymmi.com

Dorival "Dori" Tostes Caymmi (born 26 August 1943) is a Brazilian singer, songwriter, guitarist, arranger, and producer.

== Biography ==
Caymmi was born in Rio de Janeiro to parents who were musicians, his father Dorival Caymmi a composer and his mother Stella Maris a singer. When he was eight, he started piano lessons. At the Conservatório Lorenzo Fernandez, he studied music theory and harmony. He became a professional musician in 1959 when he accompanied his sister Nana in a performance.

During the next year, he became a member of Grupo dos Sete and composed music for TV. He directed the play Opinião and performed on violão for it in 1964, contributing to the growth of the MPB. He worked as a producer for Eumir Deodato, Edu Lobo, and Nara Leão and as a composer with Nelson Motta. He and Motta were an effective songwriting duo. Their song "Saveiros" won the first edition of the Festival Internacional da Canção. "O Cantador" was covered by Sarah Vaughan and Natalie Cole, while "Festa" was covered by Sérgio Mendes.

He worked as guitarist and arranger for Paul Winter's band and toured with him in the U.S. He arranged albums by Caetano Veloso, Gal Costa, and Gilberto Gil. He was involved with musicians associated with the tropicalia movement of the late 1960s but did not record in this style because he disliked pop music. During the 1970s and '80s, he composed TV and movie soundtracks, including Crônica da Casa Assassinada (1971), which wrote with Antonio Carlos Jobim. In 1989, he moved to Los Angeles, California.

His album Cinema: A Romantic Vision (Zebra, 1999) received a Latin Grammy Award nomination for his arrangement of The Pink Panther theme by Henry Mancini.

Influências was nominated for a Latin Grammy for Best Contemporary Brazilian album in 2001. Some of its songs pay homage to his father: "La Vem A Baiana" and "Acontece Que Eu Sou Baiano". Contemporâneos, recorded in 2003, was nominated for a Latin Grammy for Best Contemporary Brazilian album. His 2013 album Caymmi, with siblings Nana Caymmi and Danilo Caymmi, was nominated for the 2014 Latin Grammy Award for Best MPB Album. In 2015, he was nominated for the Latin Grammy Awards again, this time with Mario Adnet and for the Best MPB Album and Producer of the Year categories, for producing the album Centenário Caymmi.

== Discography ==
=== As leader ===
- Dory Caymmi (Odeon, 1972)
- Dori, Nana, Danilo e Dorival Caymmi (EMI/Odeon, 1987)
- Dori Caymmi (Elektra, 1988)
- Brazilian Serenata (Qwest, 1991)
- Kicking Cans (Qwest, 1993)
- Dori Caymmi: 2 Em 1 (EMI, 1994)
- If Ever... (Qwest, 1994)
- Mesters Da MPB (Continental, 1997)
- Tome Conta de Meu Filho, Que Eu Também Já Fui Do Mar... (EMI, 1997)
- Romantic Vision (Zebra, 1999)
- Cinema: a Romantic Vision (Atracao, 1999)
- Contemporâneos (Som Livre, 2003)
- Influências (Trauma, 2004)
- Rio Bahia (Far Out, 2005)
- Inner World (MusicTaste, 2009)
- Poesia Musicada (MusicTaste, 2011)
- Caymmi (Som Livre, 2013)

=== As sideman ===
- 1964: Caymmi Visita Tom (w/Nana Caymmi)
- 1966: Edu e Bethania (w/Edu Lobo)
- 1977: Miucha & Antonio Carlos Jobim (w/Miúcha)
- 1980: Tempo Presente (w/Edu Lobo)
- 1981: I Love Brazil (w/Sarah Vaughan)
- 1986: Estrela da Vida Inteira Manuel Bandeira (w/Olivia Hime)
- 1986: Brasil '86 (w/Sergio Mendes)
- 1987: Brazilian Romance (w/Sarah Vaughan)
- 1990: Sketchbook (w/John Patitucci)
- 1990: Havana (w/Dave Grusin)
- 1991: Kevyn Lettau (w/Kevyn Lettau)
- 1991: Zephyr (w/Don Grusin)
- 1991: Sweet Deal (w/Sadao Watanabe)
- 1991: Sound of Emotion (w/Gregg Karukas)
- 1991: Shadows (w/David Benoit)
- 1991: Futuro (w/Paulo Ramos)
- 1992: The Brasil Project (w/Toots Thielemans)
- 1992: Simple Life (w/Kevyn Lettau)
- 1992: No Borders (w/Don Grusin)
- 1992: Live from Bahia (w/Larry Coryell)
- 1992: Letter to Evan (w/David Benoit)
- 1993: The Brasil Project, Vol. 2 (w/Toots Thielemans)
- 1993: Spring (w/Rebecca Parris)
- 1993: Nino (w/Nino Tempo)
- 1993: Love Songs (w/Diane Schuur)
- 1994: Románza (Themes of Love) (w/Stefan Dickerson)
- 1994: Quiet After the Storm (w/Dianne Reeves)
- 1994: Mistura Fina (w/John Patitucci)
- 1994: Forbidden Fruit (w/Marion Meadows)
- 1994: Another Season (w/Kevyn Lettau)
- 1994: Among Friends (w/John Pisano)
- 1995: With Respect (w/Carmen Bradford)
- 1995: Take Me with You (w/Marilyn Scott)
- 1995: Listen Up (w/Les McCann)
- 1995: Hemispheres (w/Dan Siegel)
- 1995: Aquarela Do Brazil (w/Dionne Warwick)
- 1996: Tribute to Antonio Carlos Jobim (w/Josee Koning)
- 1997: Wouldn't It Be Nice: A Jazz Portrait of Brian Wilson (w/Various Artists)
- 1997: The Music Never Ends: The Lyrics of Alan & Marilyn Bergman (w/Maureen McGovern)
- 1997: Is Love Enough? (w/George Duke)
- 1997: Conversation Pieces (w/John Pisano)
- 1998: Brasil Nativo (w/Lani Hall)
- 1998: BRAzSIL (w/Daniel Taubkin)
- 1998: Astronauta: Songs of Elis (w/Joyce)
- 1998: State of the Heart (w/Bill Sharpe)
- 1999: Voltar Pro Rio (Back to Rio) (w/Kleber Jorge)
- 1999: I Won't Dance (Eu Nao Quero Dancer) (w/Harry Allen)
- 2001: The Look of Love (w/Diana Krall)
- 2001: Desejo (w/Nana Caymmi)
- 2002: Flamencando (w/Zezo Ribeiro)
- 2002: Back to Front (w/Arnold McCuller)
- 2002: O Mar E O Tempo (w/Nana Caymmi)
- 2003: Café Society (w/Lorraine Feather)
- 2004: Transoceanic (w/Audio Caviar)
- 2004: Outro Quilombo (w/Renato Braz)
- 2004: Nightcap (w/Marilyn Scott)
- 2004: Another Life Brazil (w/Steve Barta)
- 2004: Para Caymmi, de Nana, Dori e Danilo (w/ Nana Caymmi, Danilo Caymmi)
- 2005: Trovador (w/Kleber Jorge)
- 2005: The Love Project (w/Yevette Stewart)
- 2005: I'm in Love Once Again (w/Marilyn Scott)
- 2005: Flora's Song (w/Flora Purim)
- 2005: Bye Bye Blackbird (w/Kevyn Lettau)
- 2005: Falando de Amor – Famílias Caymmi e Jobim Cantam Antônio Carlos Jobim (w/ Nana Caymmi, Danilo Cammy, Paulo Jobim, Daniel Jobim)
- 2005: Amazon River (w/Hendrik Meurkens)
- 2005: Ivetthy Souza (w/Ivetthy Souza)
- 2006: Breath of the Soul (w/Ellen Honert)
- 2008: Nova (w/Chico Pinheiro)
- 2018: Edu, Dori & Marcos (w/Edu Lobo, Marcos Valle)
- 2020: Nana, Tom, Vinicius (with Nana Caymmi)
- 2022: Quietude (w/Eliane Elias)
