= Danilo Caymmi =

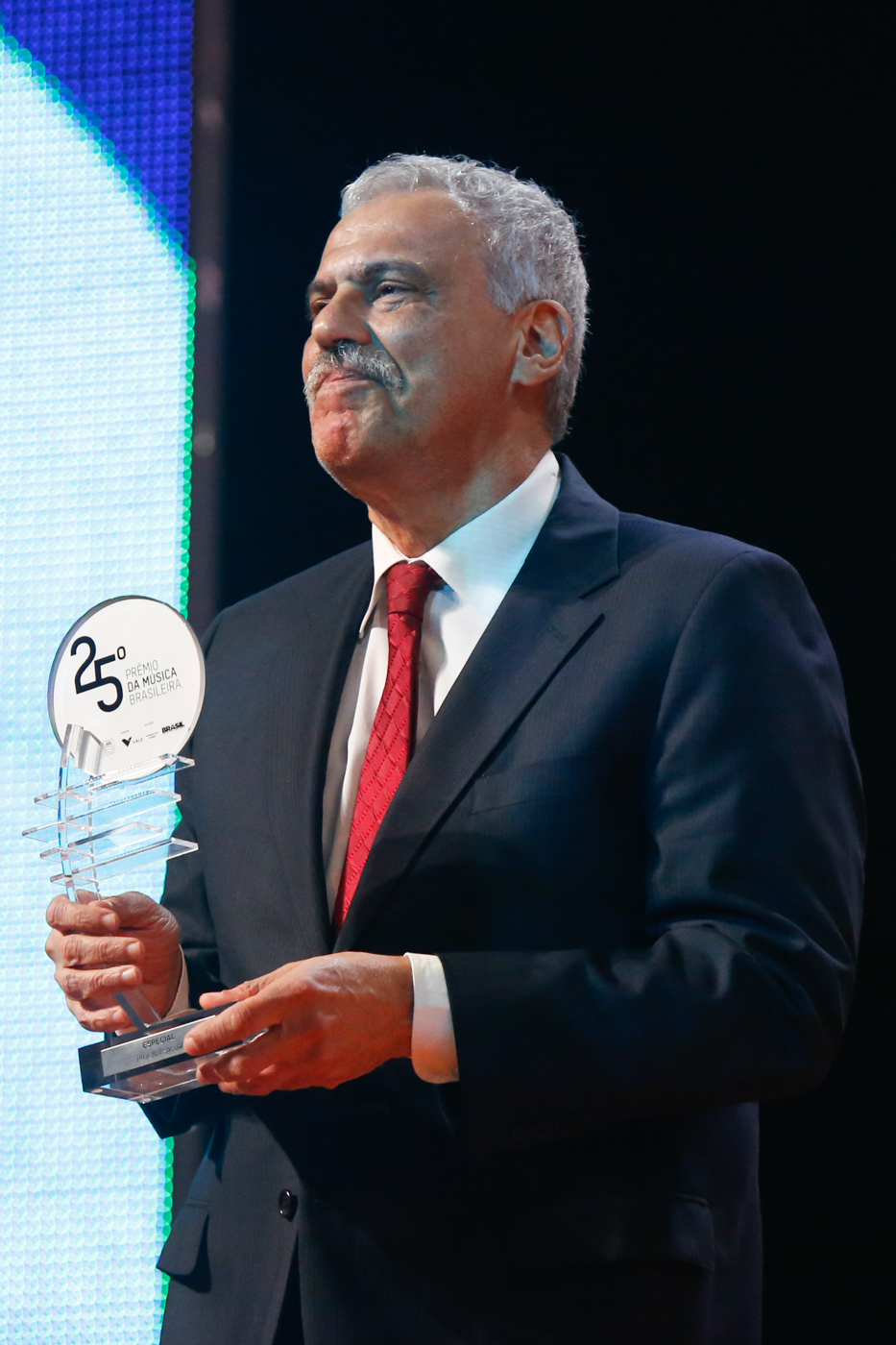
- Danilo in 2014, at the 25th edition of the Prêmio da Música Brasileira

Background information
- Born: Danilo Candido Tostes Caymmi; 7 March 1948 (age 78); Rio de Janeiro, Brazil
- Genres: MPB
- Occupations: Singer; composer; arranger
- Instruments: Vocals; flute; classical guitar

Danilo Candido Tostes Caymmi (born March 7, 1948) is a Brazilian musician, singer, composer and arranger.

Danilo was born in Rio de Janeiro, the youngest son of Dorival Caymmi and Stella Maris, and brother of Dori and Nana Caymmi. Brought up by two musical parents and older siblings, he showed an early interest in music and began playing the flute and the guitar as an adolescent. Danilo Caymmi is considered among the most notable Brazilian wind instrument musicians.

== Career ==
Danilo began his artistic career in 1963, working with Tom Jobim, both singing and playing the flute. This collaboration lasted until 1994. In 1964 he played the flute for the compilation Caymmi visita Tom, 1964.

As a composer, the first of his works to be recorded was the music for De Brincadeira, in collaboration with Edmundo Souto, in the voice of Mário Castro Neves in 1967. During this period, he accompanied many jazz musicians, such as Sarah Vaughan.

Danilo Caymmi won third place in TV Globo's Festival Internacional da Canção, third edition in 1968 with Andança (written with Edmundo Souto and Paulinho Tapajós). The song became a classic, launching the career of Beth Carvalho and since then recorded many times by different artists. Another of his biggest hits came a year later, "Casaco Marrom (Bye Bye, Ceci)," written with Guarabira and Renato Correia (the latter being one of the Golden Boys), with which he won the 1969 festival of Juiz de Fora, Minas Gerais and also had several re-recordings. As was the case with Andança, this song served to launch another new star, this time Jovem Guarda music style outfit Trio Esperança vocalist Evinha.

In 1977 Caymmi went to Bahia, where he collaborated with Tom & Dito, this time playing brass instruments. A year later, Caymmi borrowed money to record and produce 10 thousand copies of his first independent work and most well known compilation Cheiro Verde.

As a solo artist, he has recorded seven albums, interpreting his compositions.

In 1983, Danilo joined Jobim's musical group, Banda Nova, a family ensemble featuring Jobim's wife, Ana Lontra Jobim, and his son and daughter, Paulo and Elizabeth, as well as Jacques Morelembaum and his wife, Paula, and Danilo Caymmi and his wife, Simone.

In 1999, Caymmi recorded with American jazz musician David Liebman, working from a Jobim songbook. In this jazz and bossa nova collection, Caymmi sang in what is described as a "rich baritone".

To commemorate his father's 90th birthday, in 2004, Danilo and his brother Dori and sister Nana recorded a compact disc, titled Para Caymmi de Nana, Dori e Danilo (To Caymmi from Nana, Dori and Danilo), featuring Dorival Caymmi's greatest hits. The following year, they composed the album Falando de Amor – Famílias Caymmi e Jobim Cantam Antônio Carlos Jobim, with their brothers and Paulo and Daniel Jobim, heirs of Tom Jobim, to produce the album that paid tribute to Jobim's work. Ten years later, they recorded another album together, named Caymmi, which was nominated for the 2014 Latin Grammy Award for Best MPB Album.
