= Nana Caymmi =

Brazilian singer (1941–2025)

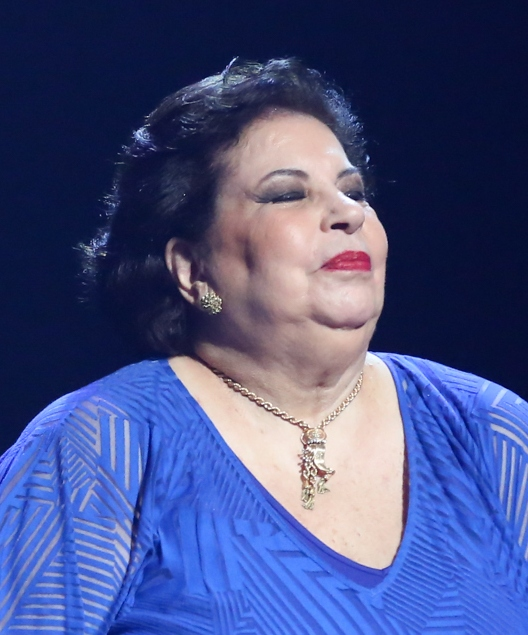
- Caymmi in 2015

Background information
- Born: Dinahir Tostes Caymmi; 29 April 1941; Rio de Janeiro, Brazil
- Died: 1 May 2025 (aged 84) Rio de Janeiro, Brazil
- Genres: MPB
- Occupation: Singer
- Instrument: Vocals
- Years active: 1960–2025
- Label: EMI
- Spouses: José Aponte Paoli (m. 1961; div. 1965) Gilberto Gil (m. 1967; div. 1969) João Donato (m. 1972; div. 1974) Cláudio Nucci (m. 1979; div. 1984)

Dinahir Tostes Caymmi (29 April 1941 – 1 May 2025), popularly known as Nana Caymmi (Brazilian Portuguese: [ˈnɐ̃nɐ kaˈĩmi]), was a Brazilian singer.

== Biography ==
Caymmi was born in Rio de Janeiro, the daughter of Dorival Caymmi and Stella Maris. Her first appearance on record was on her father's album Acalanto. She married Venezuelan doctor Gilberto Aponte Paoli and moved there in 1959. She and her husband divorced in 1966, at which time she moved back to Rio. At this time, she became involved with the Tropicalia movement; she became romantically involved with Gilberto Gil, whom she married in 1967 and divorced the year thereafter. In 1966, she sang "Saveiros" at the first Festival Internacional da Canção in Rio, and won first place in the national phase of the competition, despite boos from the crowd, who preferred Gal Costa's rendition of Gil's "Minha Senhora".

Caymmi became a controversial figure, not at home in the Tropicalia scene nor in the protest song movement. Only marginally successful, she found work singing in Portuguese language nightclubs outside of Brazil in South America. In the 1980s, she recorded several albums for EMI and appeared in the 1983 documentary Bahia de Todos os Sambas. In the 1990s, she became more successful in the mainstream with her album Bolero, which was her first of several gold albums. In 1995 and 1998, she was named Best Female Singer of the Year by the APCA. In 2010, the French film director Georges Gachot released a documentary film, Rio Sonata, about Caymmi.

Her 2013 album, Caymmi, with brothers Dori Caymmi and Danilo Caymmi, was nominated for the 2014 Latin Grammy Award for Best MPB Album. In 2019, she received another nomination in the same category, this time for the album Nana Caymmi Canta Tito Madi. In 2021, she received another nomination, this time in the Album of the Year category, for the album Nana, Tom, Vinícius.

=== Death ===
Nana Caymmi died in Rio de Janeiro on 1 May 2025, at the age of 84.

== Discography ==
- Caymmi visita Tom (1964) (with Antônio Carlos Jobim, Dorival Caymmi and Danilo Caymmi)
- Acalanto (1965)
- Nana (1967) (see footnote)
- Nana Caymmi (1973)
- Ponta de areia (1975)
- Renascer (1976)
- Nana (1977) (see footnote)
- Atrás da porta (1977)
- Se queres saber (1977)
- Contrato de separação (1979)
- Nana Caymmi (1979)
- Mudança dos ventos (1980)
- E a gente nem deu nome (1981)
- Voz e Suor (1983) (with César Camargo Mariano)
- Chora Brasileira (1985)
- Perola (1985)
- Nana (1988) (see footnote)
- So Louco (with Wagner Tiso) (1989)
- Bolero (1993)
- A noite do meu bem: As canções de Dolores Duran (1994)
- Nana, Dorival, Dori e Danilo Caymmi - Caymmi em Família (1994)
- Meus momentos (1994)
- Série brilhantes (1995)
- Alma serena (1996)
- No coração do rio (1997)
- Resposta ao tempo (1998)
- Beijo partido (1998)
- Os maiores sucessos de novela de Nana Caymmi (1999)
- Alma Serena (1999)
- Sangre de mi alma (2000)
- Em Buenos Aires (2000)
- Desejo (2001)
- O mar e o tempo (2002)
- Duetos (2003)
- No coração do Rio ao vivo (2003)
- Para Caymmi, de Nana, Dori e Danilo: 90 anos (2004)
- Até Pensei (2005)
- Fonte das Canções (2005)
- Falando de Amor – Famílias Caymmi e Jobim Cantam Antônio Carlos Jobim (2005)
- Especial (2006)
- Quem Inventou o Amor (2007)
- Sem Poupar Coração (2009)
- Nana Caymmi Canta Tito Madi (2019)
- Nana, Tom, Vinicius (2020)

Note: There are three different albums titled 'Nana' (1967, 1977, 1988)
