= Dorival Caymmi =

Brazilian singer, songwriter, actor, and painter

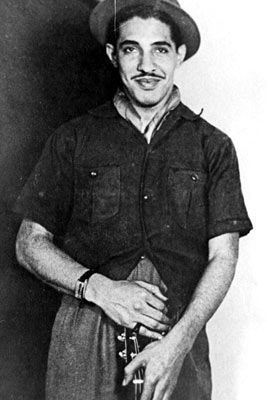
- Caymmi in 1938

Background information
- Born: Dorival Caymmi; April 30, 1914; Salvador, Bahia, Brazil
- Origin: Salvador, Bahia, Brazil
- Died: August 16, 2008 (aged 94) Copacabana, Rio de Janeiro, Brazil
- Genres: Samba, bossa nova
- Occupations: Singer, songwriter
- Instruments: Vocals, guitar
- Years active: 1933–2008
- Labels: Odeon; Columbia; Continental; RCA Victor; Elenco; Phonogram; Funarte; Som Livre; Universal; EMI

Dorival Caymmi (Brazilian Portuguese: [doɾiˈvaw kaˈĩmi]; April 30, 1914 – August 16, 2008) was a Brazilian singer, songwriter, actor, and painter active for more than 70 years, beginning in 1933. He contributed to the birth of Brazil's bossa nova movement, and several of his samba pieces, such as "Samba da Minha Terra", "Doralice" and "Saudade da Bahia", have become staples of música popular brasileira (MPB). Equally notable are his ballads celebrating the fishermen and women of Bahia, including "Promessa de Pescador", "O Que É Que a Baiana Tem?", and "Milagre". Caymmi composed about 100 songs in his lifetime, and many of his works are now considered to be Brazilian classics. Both Brazilian and non-Brazilian musicians have covered his songs.

Ben Ratliff of The New York Times wrote that Caymmi was "perhaps second only to Antônio Carlos Jobim in 'establishing a songbook of [the 20th] century's Brazilian identity.'" Throughout his career, his music about the people and culture of Bahia influenced Brazil's image in the eyes of both Brazilians and foreigners. Caymmi was married to Brazilian singer Stella Maris for 68 years, and the couple's children, Dori, Danilo, and Nana, are also prominent musicians. Each debuted professionally by accompanying Caymmi onstage and in recordings. In 2014, Caymmi's granddaughter Alice also began a musical career.

== Early life ==
Caymmi was born in Salvador, Bahia, to Durval Henrique Caymmi, the great-grandson of an Italian immigrant, and Aurelina Soares Caymmi, a native Bahian. He had two younger sisters, Dinahir and Dinah, and a younger brother, Deraldo. His father, a civil servant, often played the piano, guitar, and mandolin at home, and his mother, a housewife, sang regularly. He participated in his church's choir for much of his childhood. At age 13, he left school to work as a journalist at Bahian newspaper O Imparcial. When O Imparcial went out of business two years later, he took up work as a street vendor.

Although he never formally studied music, Caymmi taught himself to play guitar in the late 1920s and began to compose, sing, and play his own songs on Bahian radio programs around 1930. He first achieved widespread recognition in 1933, when he composed the song "O Que É Que a Baiana Tem?" ("What Is It About Bahian Women?") for singer Carmen Miranda. In 1936, at age 22, he won a songwriting contest at Salvador's annual Carnaval celebration. His prize was a pink satin lampshade. Despite his early musical success, he moved to Rio de Janeiro in 1938 with intentions to pursue a law degree and to return to working as a journalist. While employed there by the newspaper Diários Associados, he spent his spare time composing and singing songs on the radio show Dragão da Rua Larga. His popularity began to grow with the show's audience.

== Career ==
=== Overview ===
I have written 400 songs, and Caymmi 70. But Caymmi has 70 perfect songs, and I do not.

— Caetano Veloso

Many of Caymmi's lyrics pay homage to the lifestyle, beaches, fishermen, and women of his native Bahia. He drew much of his inspiration from music indigenous to northeastern Brazil, especially Afro-Brazilian music and samba. He recorded for more than five decades and released about 20 albums, sometimes singing and playing guitar as a soloist and at other times accompanied by bands and orchestras. Although active for the better part of the 20th century, Caymmi wrote only about 100 songs. Despite having a relatively small body of work, Caymmi held a reputation for composing songs of exceptional quality. He occasionally collaborated with Jobim, who called him a "universal genius" and Brazil's greatest composer. Many contemporary Brazilian artists, including Caetano Veloso, Gilberto Gil and Beth Carvalho cite Caymmi as a significant influence on their music.

=== Chronology ===
Carmen Miranda sings "O Que É Que a Baiana Tem?" in the lost film Banana da Terra (1939).

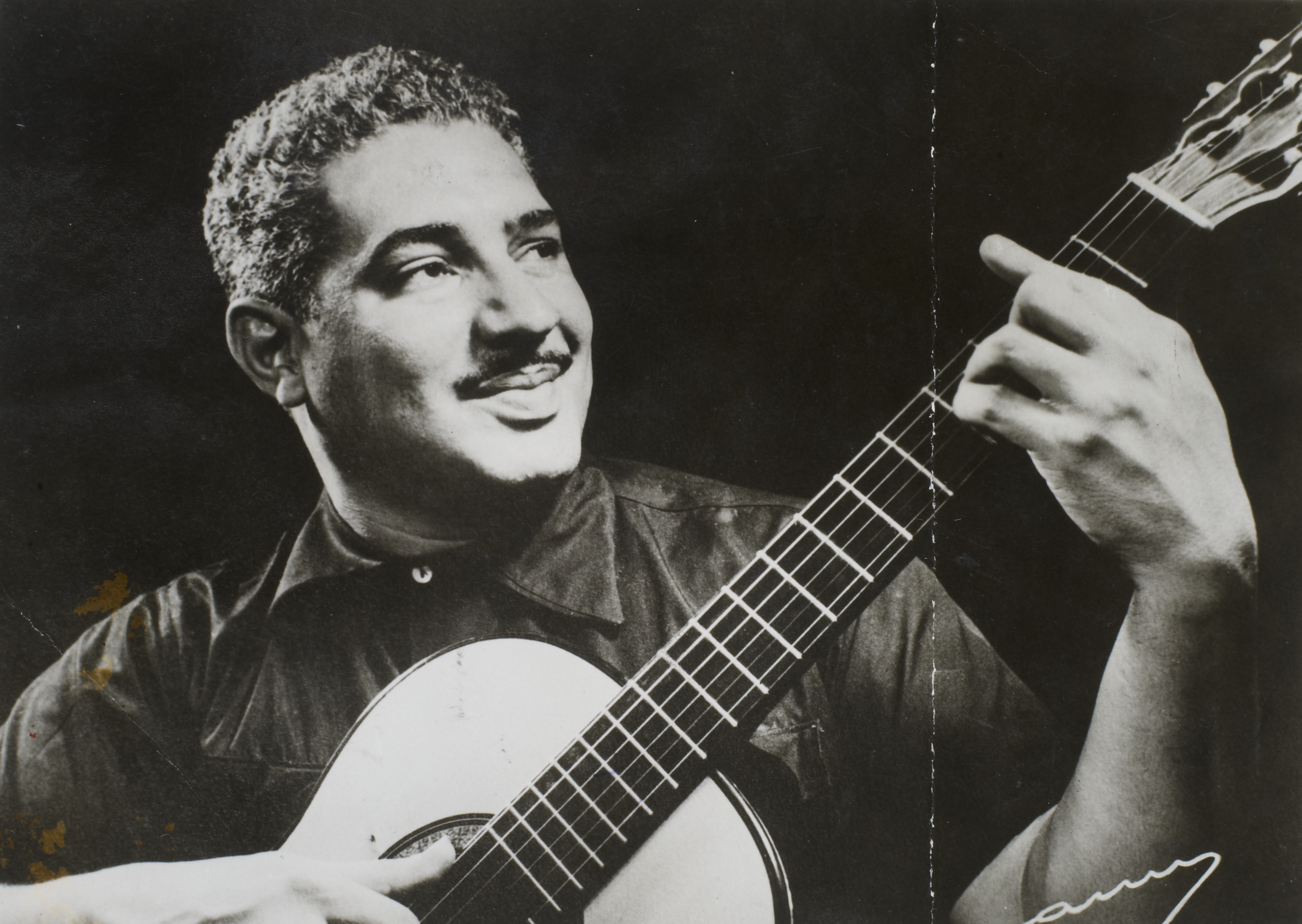
Caymmi in 1956

"O Que É Que a Baiana Tem?" gained even more fame in Brazil when Miranda performed it in the 1939 film Banana da Terra, and it was this song that garnered her international attention and helped launch her career. After this success, Caymmi began to focus more on making music, and he wrote songs that appeared in other Brazilian films. In late 1939, he signed with Odeon Records and recorded his first three singles, "Rainha do Mar/Promessa de Pescador" ("Queen of the Sea/Promise of the Fisherman"), "Roda Pião" ("Spinning Wheel"), and "O Que É Que a Baiana Tem?/A Preta do Acarajé" ("What Is It About Bahian Women?/The Black Beauty Who Sells Acarajé"). He came to more attention in the early 1940s when he performed as a regular on the Brazilian radio network Rádio Nacional. He recorded "Samba da Minha Terra" ("Samba of My Homeland") in 1940 and "A Jangada Voltou Só" ("The Raft Returned Alone") in 1941. Also in 1941, he released "Você Já Foi à Bahia?" ("Have You Been to Bahia?").

In 1944, he performed his own "Acontece Que Eu Sou Baiano" ("It Just So Happens That I'm Bahian") in the movie Abacaxi Azul (Blue Pineapple). In the late 1940s, he was a member of the samba-canção movement largely founded by his sometime creative rival, composer Ary Barroso. Other prominent Brazilian musicians of the day covered several of his songs, including Dick Farney, who famously recorded Caymmi's "Marina" (1944) in 1947. In 1957 Caymmi wrote "Suíte do Pescador", which appeared in the film The Sandpit Generals.

"Samba da Minha Terra" (1940)
Chorus of "Samba da Minha Terra"

In the 1950s and 1960s, Jobim, João Gilberto, and others who contributed to the birth of the bossa nova style collaborated with Caymmi and often referenced his work when composing their own pieces. During this era, Gilberto covered several of Caymmi's songs, including "Rosa Morena" ("Dark-skinned Rose") and "Saudade da Bahia" ("Longing for Bahia"). Jobim was particularly enamored of Caymmi's music, and the two grew to be close friends. American lyricist Ray Gilbert translated Caymmi's "Das Rosas" into English in 1965, and it was released in the United States as "...and Roses and Roses". The song was recorded by Brazilian vocalist Astrud Gilberto and by American singers Andy Williams and Perry Como. Williams's version became a hit, and as a result, Caymmi was invited to spend four months in Los Angeles, where he performed, filmed a television show, and recorded an LP record.

=== Collaboration with Jorge Amado ===
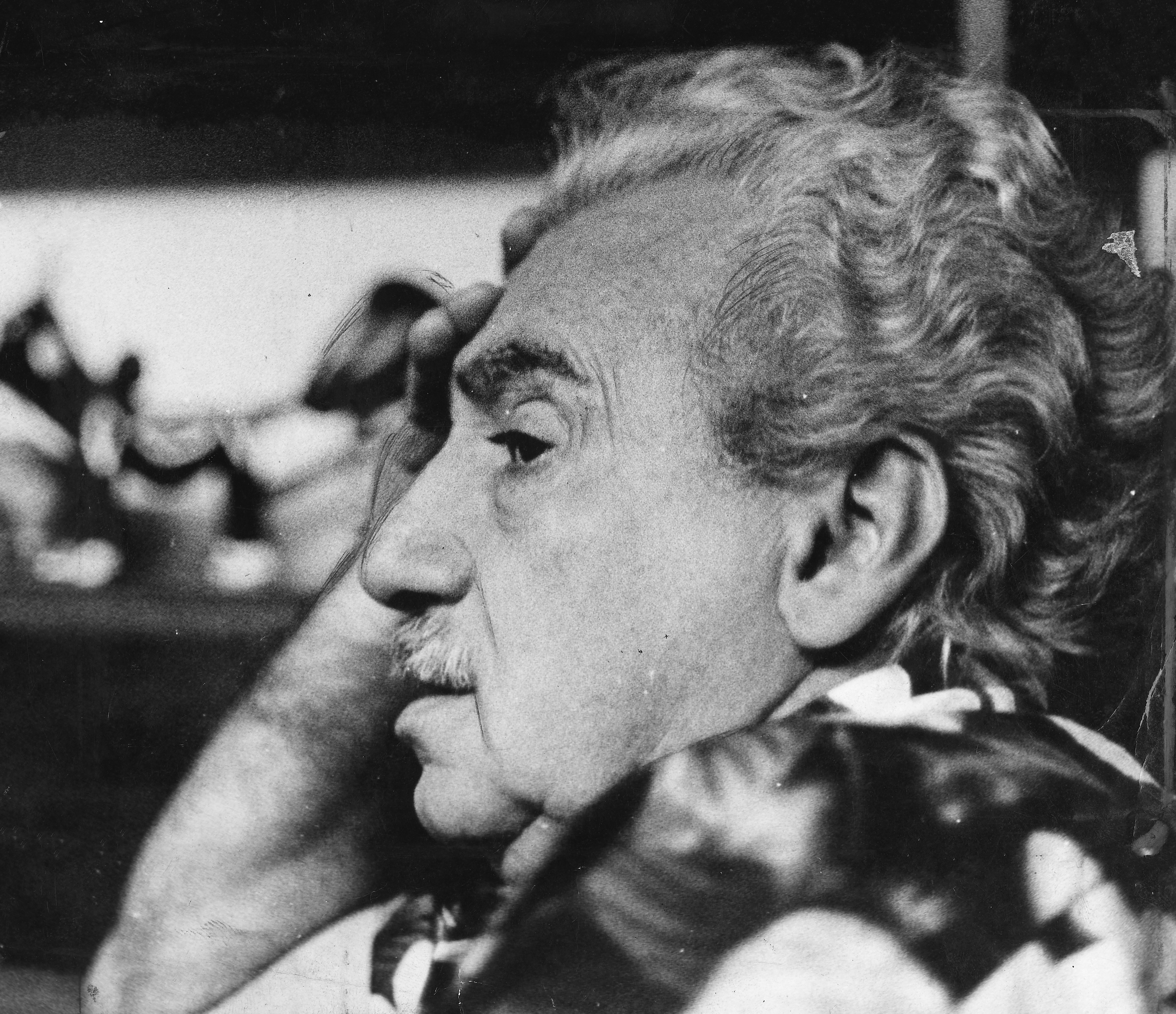
Jorge Amado, Caymmi's lifelong friend and collaborator, in 1972

Caymmi was a lifelong friend of Bahian author Jorge Amado, and in 1945, he set one of Amado's politically driven poems to music to aid the senatorial campaign of Luís Carlos Prestes. In the late 1970s, Caymmi again took inspiration from Amado when he composed "Modinha para a Gabriela" ("A Little Song for Gabriela"), a musical adaptation of Amado's novel Gabriela, Cravo e Canela (Gabriela, Clove and Cinnamon). Perhaps the best known product of Caymmi and Amado's collaboration is the song "É Doce Morrer no Mar" ("It's Sweet to Die in the Sea"), which the two wrote over dinner one night at Amado's home. Other songs they co-wrote include "Beijos pela Noite" ("Kisses Through the Night"), "Modinha para Teresa Batista" ("A Little Song for Teresa Batista"), "Retirantes" ("Migrants"), and "Essa Nega Fulô" ("This Feisty Dark Lady").

== Awards and honors ==
In 1968, to thank Caymmi for bringing international attention to Brazilian music and culture, the governor of Bahia presented Caymmi with a house in Salvador, and so he returned to live in his hometown for a short period of time. In 1972, Caymmi was awarded the Order of Merit of the State of Bahia, an order given to Bahian residents for excellent service to the state. In Caymmi's case, the service was bringing pride and honor to Bahian people through the widespread dissemination of his music about life there. On Caymmi's 70th birthday, in 1984, French Minister of Culture Jack Lang presented him with the Ordre des Arts et des Lettres, a French order that recognizes significant contributors to the fields of art and literature, in Paris. The following year, a new street named Avenida Dorival Caymmi (Dorival Caymmi Avenue) opened in Salvador. In 1986, Rio de Janeiro's famed Mangueira samba school based its Carnaval performance on Caymmi's life and work, and the school won the annual parade-style samba competition. In 2015, his tribute album Centenário Caymmi (Caymmi Centennial) was nominated for Best MPB Album at the 16th Annual Latin Grammy Awards.

== Personal life ==
When I think about Brazilian music, I will always think of Dorival Caymmi. He is an incredibly sensitive person, an incredible creation. And this is to say nothing of the painter in him, because Dorival is also a wonderful painter.

— Antônio Carlos Jobim

Although Caymmi earned his fame through music, he was also known to a lesser degree for his paintings. From 1943 to 1945, he regularly attended a drawing and painting class at the Escola de Belas Artes, a fine arts school in Rio de Janeiro. Even after discontinuing his formal study, he painted for the rest of his life. He practiced Candomblé, an Afro-Brazilian religion characterized by belief in spirit-gods and ritualistic practices involving mediumship. Candomblé was his father's religion, and Caymmi gradually involved himself more with it as an adult, when his friends invited him to accompany them to religious ceremonies and parties. Caymmi was also a naturist, and when he was in Bahia, he liked to bathe nude in the Lagoa do Abaeté (Abaeté Lagoon) with a group of friends. He stated to the newspaper Valor Econômico: "We rolled around in palm leaves and slipped through the mountains of sand. Some people didn't like this, but most understood that we weren't naked for unclean reasons."

=== Marriage ===
"Milagre" (1977)
Caymmi sings a duet with his daughter, Nana, in "Milagre".

While working at Rádio Nacional in 1939, he met Brazilian vocalist Adelaide Tostes, who is better known by her stage name Stella Maris, and the two married in 1940. Tostes responded to a 1994 press query about Caymmi's habit of frequenting bars with a short story: "One night I went to look for him in a bar ... He was surrounded by women. I went in and slammed a table. A glass broke. The bouncer came, and I punched Caymmi's face. Then I left cussing. I thought he was involved with drugs, but it wasn't the case. He was with the tramps." Despite such incidents, however, they remained together for 68 years, until his death in 2008. The couple had three children, Nana, Dori, and Danilo, all of whom followed their father into musical careers.

=== Politics ===
Although Caymmi rarely incorporated political messages into his music, he often spoke bitterly about the government's corruption. Jorge Amado, his close friend, was sent into exile for several years after he publicly criticized the country's rulers during the period of military dictatorship. In 1994, Caymmi said, "I have concluded that to act as a citizen in Brazil today is to live a joke. It's the same as playing the lotto, dreaming about nonsense, trying to get rich when you are 80."

== Death ==
Dorival Caymmi died at age 94 of kidney cancer and multiple organ failure on August 16, 2008, at his home in Copacabana, Rio de Janeiro. His granddaughter, Stella, who wrote a biography about him in 2001, said, "He did not know that he had cancer, and he did not want to know. He did not ask much about this. He was first hospitalized in 1999. My grandfather went through with treatment, but he did not want to know anything about the illness. He acted with serenity every day, and because of that, we respected this wish."

== Reception and legacy ==
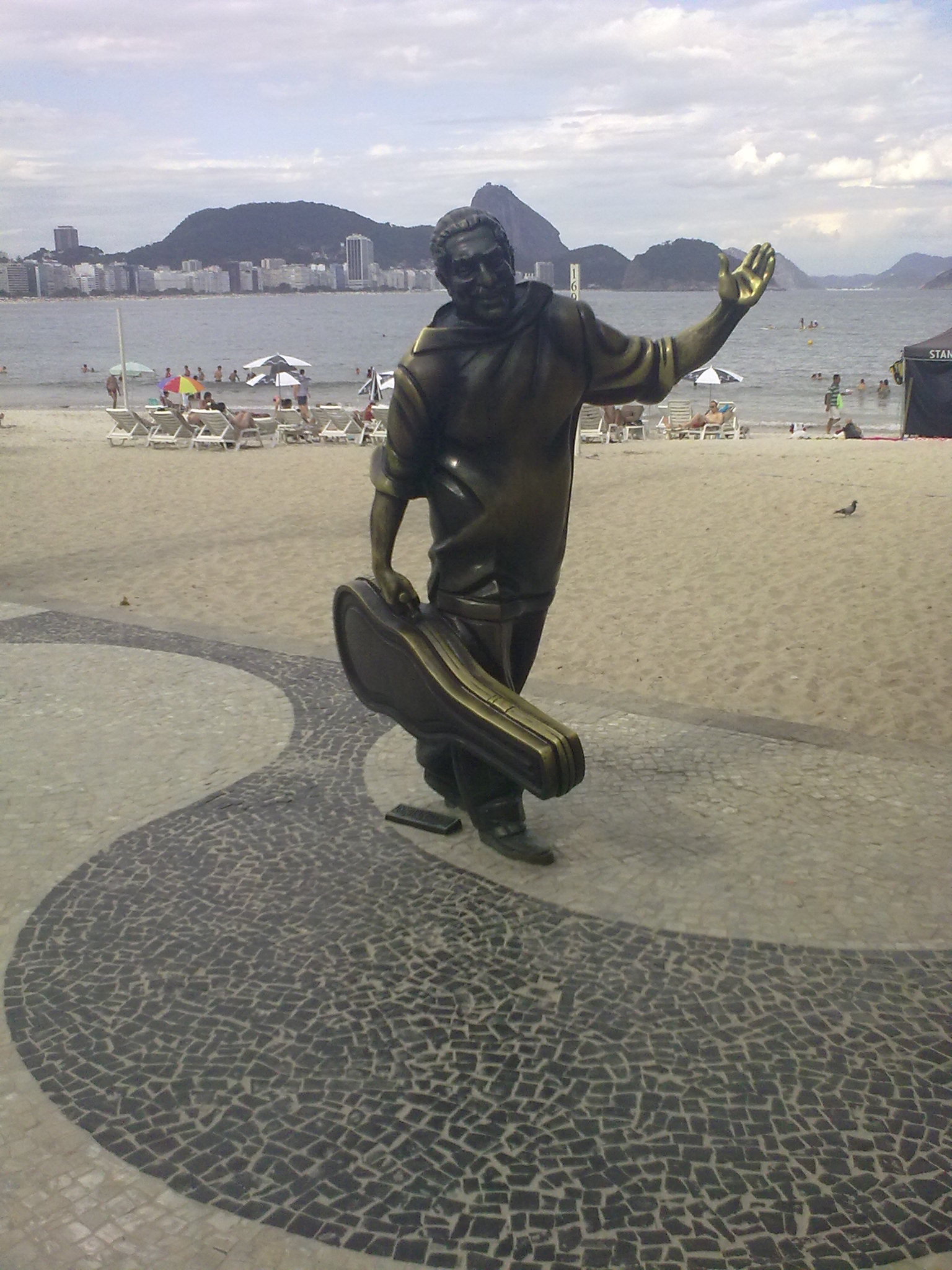
Statue of Caymmi at Copacabana Beach, Rio de Janeiro

Brazilian singer and composer Carlos Lyra praised Caymmi's style for its "suave and romantic colloquialism". In a 1994 anthology of Caymmi's work, Antônio Carlos Jobim wrote in the introduction, "Dorival is a universal genius. He picked up the guitar and orchestrated the world." In 2001, New York Times journalist Ben Ratliff wrote that Caymmi was "perhaps second only to Antônio Carlos Jobim in 'establishing a songbook of this century's Brazilian identity.'" On the day of Caymmi's death in 2008, Brazilian composer and musician Tom Zé said, "People don't understand the significance of a disc of Caymmi's beach songs from the 1940s." Also around the time of Caymmi's death, President of Brazil Luiz Inácio Lula da Silva called him "one of the founders of Brazilian popular music". Several of Caymmi's contemporaries, including Gal Costa and Olivia Hime, have recorded tributes to him.

== Discography ==
=== Albums ===
Prior to 1988, all of Caymmi's albums were released as LP records. His last four albums were released as CDs.

Year	Title	English translation	Label	Ref
1954	Canções Praieiras	Beach Songs	Odeon	
1955	Sambas	Sambas	Odeon	
1957	Eu Vou pra Maracangalha	I'm Going to Maracangalha	Odeon	
1957	Caymmi e o Mar	Caymmi and the Sea	Odeon	
1958	Ary Caymmi e Dorival Barroso	Ary Caymmi and Dorival Barroso	Odeon	
1959	Caymmi e Seu Violão	Caymmi and His Guitar	Odeon	
1960	Eu Não Tenho Onde Morar	I've Got Nowhere to Live	Odeon	
1964	Caymmi Visita Tom	Caymmi Visits Tom	Elenco	
1965	Caymmi	Caymmi	Odeon	
1967	Vinicius e Caymmi no Zum Zum	Vinicius and Caymmi at Zum Zum (Note: Zum Zum was a nightclub in Rio de Janeiro.)	Elenco	
1972	Caymmi	Caymmi	Odeon	
1973	Caymmi Também É de Rancho	Caymmi Is Also from the Ranch	Odeon	
1984	Setenta Anos	Seventy Years	Funarte	
1985	Caymmi, Som, Imagem e Magia	Caymmi, Sound, Image and Magic	Sargaço Produções	
1987	Família Caymmi	The Caymmi Family		
1988	Família Caymmi em Montreux	The Caymmi Family in Montreux	Odeon	
1994	Caymmi em Família	Caymmi as a Family	Som Livre	
1996	Caymmi Inédito	Unedited Caymmi	Universal	
2000	Caymmi: Amor e Mar	Caymmi: Love and the Sea	EMI	

=== Singles ===
All of Caymmi's singles were released as 78 rpm gramophone records.

Year	Title	English translation	Label	Ref
1939	"Rainha do Mar"/"Promessa de Pescador"	"Queen of the Sea"/"Promise of the Fisherman"	Odeon	
1939	"Roda Pião"	"Spinning Wheel"	Odeon	
1939	"O Que É Que a Baiana Tem?"/"A Preta do Acarajé"	"What Is It About Bahian Women?"/"The Dark Lady of Acarajé"	Odeon	
1940	"O Mar (I)"/"O Mar (II)"	"The Sea (I)"/"The Sea (II)"	Columbia	
1940	"Navio Negreiro"/"Noite de Temporal"	"Slave Ship"/"Stormy Night"	Odeon	
1941	"É Doce Morrer no Mar"/"A Jangada Voltou Só"	"It's Sweet to Die in the Sea"/"The Raft Returned Alone"	Columbia	
1941	"Essa Nega Fulô"/"Balaío Grande"	"This Feisty Dark Lady"/"Great Hamper"	Columbia	
1943	"O Mar (I)"/"O Mar (II)" (Note: Reissued under new label.)	"The Sea (I)"/"The Sea (II)"	Continental	
1943	"É Doce Morrer no Mar"/"A Jangada Voltou Só"	"It's Sweet to Die in the Sea"/"The Raft Returned Alone"	Continental	
1943	"Essa Nega Fulô"/"Balaío Grande"	"This Feisty Dark Lady"/"Great Hamper"	Continental	
1945	"Dora"/"Peguei Um Ita no Norte"	"Dora"/"I Caught a Steamboat in the North"	Odeon	
1946	"A Vizinha do Lado"/"Trezentos e Sessenta e Cinco Igrejas"	"The Girl Next Door"/"Three Hundred and Sixty-five Churches"	Odeon	
1947	"Marina"/"Lá Vem a Baiana"	"Marina"/"Here Comes the Bahian Girl"	RCA Victor	
1948	"Cantiga"/"Sodade Matadera"	"Folk Song"/"Agonizing Longing"	RCA Victor	
1948	"A Lenda do Abaeté"/"Saudades de Itapoã"	"The Legend of Abaeté"/"Missing Itapoã"	RCA Victor	
1949	"O Vento"/"Festa de Rua"	"The Wind"/"Block Party"	RCA Victor	
1952	"Não Tem Solução"/"Nem Eu"	"There Is No Solution"/"Me Neither"	Odeon	
1953	"Tão Só"/"João Valentão"	"So Alone"/"Tough John"	Odeon	
1954	"A Jangada Voltou Só"/"É Doce Morrer no Mar"	"The Raft Returned Alone"/"It's Sweet to Die in the Sea"	Odeon	
1954	"Quem Vem pra Beira do Mar"/"Pescaria (Canoeiro)"	"Who's Coming to the Seaside"/"Fishing (in a Canoe)"	Odeon	
1956	"Maracangalha"/"Fiz uma Viagem"	"Maracangalha"/"I Took a Journey"	Odeon	
1956	"Saudades de Itapoã"/"A Lenda do Abaeté"	"Missing Itapoã"/"The Legend of Abaeté"	Odeon	
1956	"Sábado em Copacabana"/"Só Louco"	"Saturday in Copacabana"/"Just Crazy"	Odeon	
1957	"2 de Fevereiro"/"Saudades de Itapoã"	"The Second of February"/"Missing Itapoã"	Odeon	
1957	"Acalanto"/"História pro Sinhozinho"	"Lullaby"/"A Story for the Little Man"	Odeon	
1957	"Saudade da Bahia"/"Roda Pião"	"Missing Bahia"/"Spinning Wheel"	Odeon	
1960	"Rosa Morena"/"Acalanto"	"Dark Rose"/"Lullaby"	Odeon	
1960	"São Salvador"/"Eu Não Tenho Onde Morar"	"São Salvador" (Note: Here, "São Salvador" is in reference to the full name of the city of Salvador, Bahia: São Salvador da Bahia de Todos os Santos.)/"I've Got Nowhere to Live"	Odeon	

=== Tributes ===
Year	Artist	Title	English translation	Label	Ref(s)
1976	Gal Costa	Gal Canta Caymmi	Gal Sings Caymmi	Phonogram	
2002	Olivia Hime	Mar de Algodão: As Marinhas de Caymmi	Sea of Cotton: The Seascapes of Caymmi	Biscoito Fino	
2004	Various	Caymmi: 90 Anos – Mar e Terra	Caymmi: 90 Years – Sea and Land	BMG	
