= Antônio Carlos Jobim discography =

This is a list of published recordings of Antônio Carlos Jobim.

== Albums ==
=== Studio albums ===
| Title | Release date | Label | Formats | Peak chart positions | |
| Title | Release date | Label | Formats | US | Jazz Albums chart |
|---|---|---|---|---|---|
| The Composer of Desafinado, Plays | August, 1963 | Verve | LP, cassette | — | — |
| Getz/Gilberto | 1964 | Verve | LP, cassette | 2 | 4 |
| The Wonderful World of Antonio Carlos Jobim | 1965 | Warner Bros. | LP, cassette | 57 | — |
| A Certain Mr. Jobim | 1967 | Warner Bros. | LP, cassette | — | 16 |
| Francis Albert Sinatra & Antonio Carlos Jobim | 1967 | United Western Recorders | LP, cassette | 19 | 4 |
| Wave | 1967 | CTI/A&M | LP, cassette | 114 | 5 |
| Stone Flower | 1970 | CTI/A&M | LP, cassette | 196 | 18 |
| Tide | 1970 | CTI/A&M | LP, cassette | — | — |
| Jobim | 1973 | MCA | LP, cassette | — | — |
| Urubu | 1976 | Warner Bros. | LP, cassette | — | — |
| Terra Brasilis | 1980 | Warner Bros. | LP, cassette | — | 42 |
| Passarim | 1987 | Verve | LP, cassette | — | — |
| Antonio Brasileiro | 1994 | Columbia | LP, cassette | — | — |

== Discography complete ==
=== Studio albums ===
- 1963: The Composer of Desafinado, Plays (Verve)
- 1965: The Wonderful World of Antonio Carlos Jobim (Warner Bros.)
- 1966: Love, Strings and Jobim (Warner Bros.)
- 1967: A Certain Mr. Jobim (Warner Bros.)
- 1967: Wave (CTI/A&M)
- 1970: Stone Flower (CTI)
- 1970: Tide (A&M)
- 1973: Matita Perê (Philips)
- 1973: Jobim (MCA)
- 1976: Urubu (Warner Bros.)
- 1980: Terra Brasilis (Warner Bros.)
- 1987: Passarim (Verve)
- 1994: Antonio Brasileiro (Columbia)
- 1995: Inédito (Ariola)
- 1997: Minha Alma Canta (Lumiar)

=== Compilations ===
- 1970: Look to the Sky (A&M) UK only
- 1979: Sinatra–Jobim Sessions
- 1987: Personalidade
- 1990: Compact Jazz [Verve Music Group]
- 1994: Verve Jazz Masters 13 [Verve Music Group]
- 1995: Antonio Carlos Jobim: Composer (Warner Bros. 2-46114)
- 1995: The Girl from Ipanema The Antonio Carlos Jobim Songbook (Verve/Polygram)
- 1998: Jazz 'Round Midnight [Verve Music Group]
- 1999: The Best of Tom Jobim
- 2000: The Tom Jobim Sessions (outtakes with various artists)
- 2000: Antonio Carlos Jobim's Finest Hour [Verve Music Group]
- 2002: The Outtakes (outtakes as a solo artist)
- 2005: The Best of Antonio Carlos Jobim: 20th Century Masters/The Millennium Collection
- 2006: Sinfonia do Rio de Janeiro (with Billy Blanco)
- 2006: Sinatra-Jobim (outtakes with Frank Sinatra)
- 2007: Antonio Carlos Jobim For Lovers [Verve Music Group]
- 2009: The Complete Tom Jobim (boxset)
- 2016: 40 Sucessos de Ouro

=== Live albums ===
- 1977: Gravado ao Vivo no Canecão (with Vinicius, Toquinho, Miúcha)
- 1986: Jazzvisions: Rio Revisited (with Gal Costa)
- 1996: Antonio Carlos Jobim and Friends (with Shirley Horn, Jon Hendricks, Gal Costa, Joe Henderson, Herbie Hancock, Gonzalo Rubalcaba and others)
- 2001: Tom Canta Vinícius: Ao Vivo (recorded in 1990)
- 2004: Em Minas ao Vivo: Piano e Voz (recorded in 1981)
- 2006: Tom Jobim Ao Vivo Em Montreal

=== Soundtracks ===
- 1959: Black Orpheus (Soundtrack)
- 1970: The Adventurers (Soundtrack)
- 1983: Gabriela, Cravo e Canela (Soundtrack)
- 1986: Moments of Play (Soundtrack)
- 1997: Lost Highway (Soundtrack)

=== As contributor ===
- 1958: Canção do Amor Demais – Elizete Cardoso
- 1959: Amor de Gente Moça – Sylvia Telles
- 1959: Chega de Saudade – João Gilberto
- 1959: Por Tôda a Minha Vida – Lenita Bruno
- 1960: O Amor, o Sorriso e a Flor – João Gilberto
- 1962: Do the Bossa Nova with Herbie Mann
- 1962: Latin Fever with Herbie Mann
- 1965: Recorded In Rio – João Gilberto, Herbie Mann
- 1965: The Swinger from Rio – Sérgio Mendes
- 1966: Love, Strings and Jobim (various)
- 1967: Antonio Carlos Jobim & Sergio Mendes
- 1995: Abandoned Garden – Michael Franks

=== With Billy Blanco ===
- 1954: Sinfonia Do Rio De Janeiro

=== With Vinicius de Moraes ===
- 1956: Orfeu da Conceição
- 1961: Brasília – Sinfonia Da Alvorada

=== With Stan Getz ===
- 1963: Getz/Gilberto
- 1963: Jazz Samba Encore! (with Luiz Bonfá)
- 1964: Getz/Gilberto Vol. 2

=== With Dorival Caymmi ===
- 1964: Caymmi visita Tom

=== With Astrud Gilberto ===
- 1965: The Astrud Gilberto Album

=== With Edu Lobo ===
- 1981: Edu & Tom

=== With Elis Regina ===
- 1974: Elis & Tom

=== With Miúcha ===
- 1977: Miúcha & Antônio Carlos Jobim
- 1979: Miúcha & Tom Jobim

=== With Frank Sinatra ===
- 1967: Francis Albert Sinatra & Antônio Carlos Jobim
- 1971: Sinatra & Company
- 1994: "Fly Me to the Moon" – Duets II

== Songs ==
Lyrics by Vinicius de Moraes unless otherwise noted

- "A felicidade"
- "Água de Beber" ("Water To Drink")
- "Águas de Março" ("Waters of March")
- "Amor Sem Adeus"
- "Anos Dourados" ("Looks Like December")
- "As Praias Desertas"
- "Bonita"
- "Borzeguim"
- "Brigas Nunca Mais"
- "Caminhos Cruzados"
- "Canta, Canta Mais"
- "Chansong"
- "Chega de Saudade" ("No More Blues")
- "Chovendo na Roseira" ("Children's Games"; "Double Rainbow")
- "Corcovado" ("Quiet Nights of Quiet Stars")
- "Demais"
- "Desafinado" ("Off Key"; "Slightly Out of Tune")
- "Dindi"
- "Discussão"
- "Ela é Carioca"
- "Este Seu Olhar"
- "Estrada Branca" ("This Happy Madness")
- "Estrado do Sol" ("Road to the Sun")
- "Eu Não Existo Sem Você"
- "Eu Sei Que Vou Te Amar"
- "Falando de Amor"
- "Fotografia" ("Photograph")
- "Garota de Ipanema" ("The Girl from Ipanema")
- "Insensatez" ("How Insensitive")
- "Inútil Paisagem" ("Useless Landscape"; "If You Never Come to Me")
- "Ligia"
- "Look to the Sky"
- "Luíza"
- "Meditação" ("Meditation")
- "Modinha"
- "Nuvens Douradas" ("Golden Clouds")
- "O Amor em Paz" ("Once I Loved")
- "O Grande Amor"
- "O Morro Não Tem Vez" ("Favela")
- "Outra Vez" ("Once Again")
- "Passarim"
- "Pois É"
- "Por Causa de Você" ("Don't Ever Go Away")
- "Por Toda Minha Vida"
- "Retrato Em Branco E Preto" ("Portrait in Black and White")
- "Sabiá"
- "Samba do Avião"
- "Samba de Uma Nota Só" ("One Note Samba")
- "Se Todos Fossem Iguais A Você" ("Someone to Light Up My Life")
- "Só Danço Samba" ("I Only Dance Samba"; "Jazz Samba")
- "Só Tinha de Ser com Você"
- "Stone Flower"
- "Sucedeu Assim"
- "Surfboard"
- "Tema de Amor de Gabriela"
- "Tide"
- "Triste" ("Sad")
- "Two Kites"
- "Vivo Sonhando" ("Dreamer")
- "Vou Te Contar" ("Wave")

== Concert films ==
- 2002: Antonio Carlos Jobim: An All-Star Tribute (with Herbie Hancock, Joe Henderson, Shirley Horn, Jon Hendricks, Gonzalo Rubalcaba)
- 2007: Antonio Carlos Jobim in Concert
- 2007: Live at Montreal Jazz Festival
- 2009: Tom Jobim: The Waters of March
