= Inútil Paisagem =

Song by Antônio Carlos Jobim

Song
- Language: Portuguese
- English title: "If You Never Come to Me"
- Genre: Bossa nova
- Composer: Antônio Carlos Jobim
- Lyricists: Aloysio de Oliveira (Portuguese); Ray Gilbert (English)

"Inútil Paisagem" (lit. "Useless Landscape") is a song composed by Antônio Carlos Jobim, with lyrics by Aloysio de Oliveira. An English-language version with lyrics by Ray Gilbert is titled "If You Never Come to Me".

== Notable recordings ==
with Antônio Carlos Jobim

- 1964: Dorival Caymmi & Tom Jobim – Caymmi Visita Tom e Leva Seus Filhos Nana, Dori & Danilo (Elenco), also released as single B-side of "... Das Rosas"
- 1964: Sergio Mendes Trio featuring Antonio Carlos Jobim and Art Farmer – Bossa Nova York(Elenco)
- 1965: The Wonderful World of Antonio Carlos Jobim (Elenco/Warner Bros.)
- 1967: Frank Sinatra and Jobim - Francis Albert Sinatra & Antonio Carlos Jobim (Reprise)
- 1967: Antônio Carlos Jobim & Sérgio Mendes - Antonio Carlos Jobim & Sérgio Mendes (Elenco)
- 1974: Elis Regina and Jobim - Elis & Tom (Philips)
- 1987: Inédito (Ariola)

Others

- 1964: Conjunto Som 4 (Hermeto Pascoal a.o.) on their album Conjunto Som 4 (Continental/Warner)
- 1964: Eumir Deodato - Inútil Paisagem - As Maiores Composições de Antonio Carlos Jobim
- 1964: Morgana King - It's a Quiet Thing
- 1964: Os Cariocas - A Grande Bossa dos Cariocas
- 1964: Cauby Peixoto – "Balançafro" single B-side
- 1964: Wanda Sá - Wanda Vagamente
- 1964: Wilson Simonal – A Nova Dimensão do Samba (Odeon)
- 1964: Walter Wanderley - O Toque Inconfundível de Walter Wanderley
- 1964: Paul Winter, w/ Luiz Bonfa, Roberto Menescal & Luiz Eça – Rio(Columbia)
- 1964: Zimbo Trio - Zimbo Trio(RGE)
- 1965: Milton Banana Trio (with Walter Wanderley) - Milton Banana Trio(Odeon)
- 1966: Sylvia Telles - The Music of Mr. Jobim
- 1966: Quarteto em Cy - Quarteto em Cy(Elenco)
- 1967: Dick Farney - Dick Farney, piano e Orquestra Gaya, and Dick Farney (1975)
- 1969: Ella Fitzgerald - Sunshine of Your Love, and Ella Abraça Jobim (1981)
- 1988: Nana Caymmi – Nana (EMI)
- 1991: Azymuth – Tudo Bem(Intima)
- 1995: Javon Jackson - For One Who Knows
- 1998: Michael Moore Trio (with Fred Hersch and Mark Helias) – Bering (Ramboy)
- 1999: Joyce e Toninho Horta – Sem Você (DiscMedi Blau)
- 2001: Ana Caram – Blue Bossa(Chesky)
- 2001: Ivan Lins - Jobiniando (Abril/EMI)
- 2001: Jaques Morelenbaum, Paula Morelenbaum, and Ryuichi Sakamoto -Morelenbaum 2/Sakamoto: A Day in New York (2003) (Universal/Sony)
- 2003: Cibelle, with Johnny Alf - Cibelle
- 2006: Ignacio Berroa - Codes
- 2006: Aaron Goldberg - Worlds
- 2007: Kurt Elling - Nightmoves
- 2007: Teresa Salgueiro & Septeto de João Cristal – Você e Eu (Capitol/EMI)
- 2008: Cristina Braga, Eugene Friesen – Paisagem (Biscoito Fino)
- 2008: Milton Nascimento and Jobim Trio - Novas Bossas(EMI)
- 2008: Caetano Veloso - Roberto Carlos e Caetano Veloso e a Música de Tom Jobim (Amigo/Sony)
- 2010: Vinicius Cantuária - Samba Carioca
- 2010: Mark Murphy - Never Let Me Go
- 2010: Esperanza Spalding featuring Gretchen Parlato - Chamber Music Society
- 2012: Luciana Souza – Duos III (Sunnyside)
- 2012: Stéphane Spira - Round About Jobim
- 2013: Janis Siegel - Night Songs: A Late Night Interlude
- 2016: Carminho - Carminho canta Tom Jobim
