= Ela é Carioca =

"Ela é Carioca" ("She’s a Carioca") is a bossa nova song composed in 1963 by Antônio Carlos Jobim, with Portuguese lyrics by Vinícius de Moraes. English lyrics were written by Ray Gilbert. The song is sometimes titled "Ele é Carioca (He’s a Carioca)."

"Carioca" is a Brazilian term for someone from or something related to Rio de Janeiro.

John Bush at AllMusic calls the song "a cheerful sequel to 'The Girl From Ipanema,'" which was also written by Jobim and Moraes, and features lyrics about a young woman from Rio.

The song was used as the name of a 2005 documentary film about "Jobim's love for Rio de Janeiro and the influence it had on his music" - Tom Jobim: She’s a Carioca.

The first recording of the song was by Os Cariocas in 1963. Antônio Carlos Jobim recorded it for his 1965 album, The Wonderful World of Antonio Carlos Jobim.

== Recorded Versions ==
- Os Cariocas - Mais Bossa Com Os Cariocas (1963
- Rosinha de Valença – Apresentando (1963)
- Marcos Valle - Samba "Demais" (1963)
- Eumir Deodato - Inútil Paisagem - As Maiores Composições de Antonio Carlos Jobim (1964)
- Sergio Mendes & Bossa Rio – Você Ainda Não Ouviu Nada! (1964)
- Paul Winter, w/ Luiz Bonfa, Roberto Menescal & Luiz Eça – Rio (1964)
- Milton Banana – Milton Banana Trio (1965)
- Antônio Carlos Jobim - The Wonderful World of Antonio Carlos Jobim (1965)
- Sergio Mendes Trio, with Wanda de Sah & Rosinha de Valença – Brasil '65 (1965)
- Astrud Gilberto – Look to the Rainbow (1966)
- Buddy Greco – Away, We Go! (1966)
- Herbie Mann – New Mann at Newport (1967)
- Stanley Turrentine – A Bluish Bag (rec. 1967, released 2007)
- Walter Wanderley - Batucada (1967)
- João Gilberto – João Gilberto en México (1970)
- Ella Fitzgerald - Ella Abraça Jobim (1981) – as "He’s a Carioca (Ele é Carioca)"
- Eliane Elias - Eliane Elias Sings Jobim (1998)
- João Donato – Só danço samba (1999)
- Quarteto Jobim Morelenbaum - Quarteto Jobim Morelenbaum (2000)
