= Inédito (Antônio Carlos Jobim album) =

- Cover art for the 1995 General Public Re-Release.

Studio album by Antônio Carlos Jobim
- Released: 1987 (Limited Release); 1995 (General Public Re-Release)
- Recorded: May 18–August 30, 1987
- Genres: Bossa nova, jazz
- Length: 69:15
- Labels: Odebrecht (Original Release); Ariola (Re-Release)
- Producers: Vera de Alencar, Jairo Severiano

Antônio Carlos Jobim chronology
Passarim (1987)	Inédito (1987)	Antonio Brasileiro (1995)

Inédito (AKA The Unknown and originally titled Tom Jobim for its original 1987 Release) was a privately commissioned studio album by Antônio Carlos Jobim, released in 1987 in a limited edition to commemorate his 60th birthday, and re-released in 1995 for the general public. It was released in the United States in 2006 as The Unknown, by DRG Records.

The album was a career retrospective that featured many of Jobim's most famous songs, along with lesser-known material that he had never previously recorded. He later claimed that Inédito was the album he most enjoyed recording and believed it was one of the best works of his career.

== Background ==
In 1987, Jobim celebrated his 60th birthday. To mark the occasion, Brazilian industrial conglomerate Odebrecht commissioned Tom to record a limited edition album, allowing him financial and artistic control. The project was overseen by Vera de Alencar, Jobim's friend and the museologist responsible for his archive of music and papers, and Jairo Severiano, a noted historian of Brazilian popular music. Jobim worked on the recordings around the same time as Passarim (Verve, 1987), which was his first album in seven years. Four thousand copies of the private recordings were distributed to schools, libraries, museums, and Odebrecht customers as a Christmas gift. A year after Jobim's death, his family reached an agreement with Odebrecht to release the album to the general public through BMG Brazil.

== Recording ==
As part of the agreement to do the album, Jobim stipulated that recording be done at his house in the Jardim Botânico district, Rio de Janeiro. His piano room was converted into a recording studio, with Carlos de Andrade serving as sound engineer. Tracks were cut between May 13 and August 30, 1987.

"We began around eleven in the evening," recalled Severiano, "when there was no more movement in the streets and the danger of noise leakage, and finished no earlier than two in the morning." Jobim added, "In this house of mine, one hears a frog croak from a 200 meter distance."

For musicians, Jobim relied on Banda Nova, his touring and recording group that included close friends and family, such as his wife Ana, daughter Elizabeth, and son Paulo, along with Jaques and Paula Morelenbaum, and Danilo Caymmi and his wife Simone.

"We recorded absolutely at ease, without the usual industry pressures," said Paulo Jobim.

== Critical reception ==
Professional ratings
Review scores
Source	Rating
AllMusic	4/5 stars

Inédito received unanimously positive reviews when it was released to the general public.

The Daily Telegraph hailed the album as "a lost gem by Brazil's finest songwriter," and critic Mark Hudson wrote in his review that "the re-release of an extraordinary, yet little-known album from Jobim's twilight years sheds new light on this fascinating figure and on the whole bossa phenomenon."

Hudson lauded Inéidto's "fabulous sweep" showing the range of musical genres and artists that influenced Jobim's work, such as West Coast jazz, European modernism, Debussy, and Brazilian composer Pixinguinha. "You get a sense of this rich blend of influences on Inedito. The siren sweep of the female voices brings a sense of exaltation with echoes of African religious chants, the Catholic liturgy and the fugitive textures that have all fed into Brazilian music. And yet an element of kitsch never leaves the picture. . . . For all the sophistication of his musical vision, Jobim is a popular composer, who never loses sight of his music's origins in the bars and beach parties of Rio. Like his contemporary Burt Bacharach, he does extraordinary things with melody, while making sure to give the man in the street an easily digested emotional pay-off. It is this complex mingling of the high and the low, of the refined and the faintly naff, that makes Jobim and bossa nova itself such a compelling phenomenon."

John Lannert at Billboard called the album "a critical masterpiece", while The Wall Street Journal referred to Inédito as a "fully realized gem. . . . The up-tempo songs are lovingly redefined . . . and the explorations of Jobim's more brooding, somber works are startlingly effective. 'The Unknown' captures the breadth and depth of Jobim's remarkable body of work, which remains the wellspring of a thriving musical movement."

Jobim's music "shines in the hands of its eternal master," claimed Philadelphia Weekly. The album also included are several lesser-known compositions, from the brooding waltzy piano solo 'Imagina' to the ebullient 'Derradeira Primavera.'"

In his AllMusic review of Inédito, Richard S. Ginell said, "The feeling of saudade is very much front and center on Jobim's birthday present to himself -- he later said that this was his favorite album -- and all of his connoisseurs should try to hunt it down."

== Track listing ==
All songs written by Antônio Carlos Jobim, lyricsts indicated. (Except #7, written by Heitor Villa-Lobos and Manuel Bandeira.)

1. "Wave" - 2:48
2. "Chega de Saudade" (Vinícius de Moraes) - 3:49
3. "Sabiá" (Chico Buarque) - 3:19
4. "Samba do Avião" - 3:24
5. "Garota de Ipanema (The Girl from Ipanema)" (de Moraes) - 4:02
6. "Retrato Em Branco E Preto" (Buarque) - 2:05
7. "Modinha (Seresta n˚ 5)" (Villa-Lobos, Bandeira) - 2:54
8. "Modinha" (de Moraes) - 2:15
9. "Canta, Canta Mais" (de Moraes) - 3:59
10. "Eu Não Existo Sem Você" (de Moraes) - 2:44
11. "Por Causa de Você" (Dolores Duran) - 2:24
12. "Sucedeu Assim" (Marino Pinto) 2:31
13. "Imagina" (Buarque) - 1:52
14. "Eu Sei Que Vou Te Amar" (de Moraes) - 1:51
15. "Canção do Amor Demais" (de Moraes) - 1:42
16. "Falando de Amor" - 3:53
17. "Inútil Paisagem" (Aloísio de Oliveira) - 2:48
18. "Derradeira Primavera" (de Moraes) - 2:16
19. "Canção em Modo Menor" (de Moraes) - 2:20
20. "Estrada Do Sol" (Duran) - 3:12
21. "Águas de Março (Waters of March)" - 3:36
22. "Samba de Uma Nota Só" (Newton Mendonça) - 3:00
23. "Desafinado" (Mendonça) - 2:55
24. "A Felicidade" (de Moraes) - 3:51

== Personnel ==
From the 2006 DRG edition liner notes.

Musicians

- Antônio Carlos Jobim – piano (all tracks); vocals 2–5, 10, 12, 14, 19, 21–23); vocal support (9); arranger
- Paulo Jobim – guitar (1–5, 9, 16, 20–24); arranger
- Jaques Morelenbaum – cello (1–6, 9–10, 16, 18, 21–24); arranger
- Danilo Caymmi – flute (1, 3–5, 11, 16, 18, 20–24); vocals (4–5, 7–8, 16, 23–24); vocal support (2–5, 9, 18, 24)
- Sebastião Neto – bass (1–5, 9, 11, 16, 18, 20–24)
- Paulo Braga – drums (1–5, 16, 20–21, 23–24)
- David Sacks – trombone (1–2, 4, 16)
- Paula Morelenbaum – vocals (6, 9, 11, 15, 20); vocal support (2–5, 18, 21–24)
- Ana Lontra Jobim – vocals (6, 10, 20); vocal support (2–5, 9, 18, 21–24)
- Elizabeth Jobim – vocals (6, 9, 20); vocal support (2–5, 18, 21–24)
- Maúcha Adnet – vocals (6, 17, 20); vocal support (2–5, 9, 18, 21–24)
- Simone Caymmi – vocals (6, 16, 20); vocal support (2–5, 9, 18, 21–24)
- String Orchestra – 6, 11, 15, 18, 24

Production

- Vera de Alencar – Phonographic producer
- Jairo Severiano – Phonographic producer
- Jaques Morelenbaum – Musical producer
- Paulo Jobim – Musical producer
- Carlos de Andrade – Recording engineer
- Elizabeth Jobim – Cover design
- Ana Jobim – Photographs
