= The Wonderful World of Antônio Carlos Jobim =

Studio album by Antônio Carlos Jobim
- Released: 1965
- Recorded: 1965
- Genre: Latin jazz, bossa nova
- Length: 29:11
- Label: Warner Bros.
- Producer: Jimmy Hillard

Antônio Carlos Jobim chronology
The Composer of Desafinado Plays (1963)	The Wonderful World of Antônio Carlos Jobim (1965)	Love, Strings and Jobim (1966)

The Wonderful World of Antônio Carlos Jobim is the second studio album by Antônio Carlos Jobim with arrangements by Nelson Riddle. It was released in 1965 and was number 57 on the Billboard 200 1965 year-end chart.

== Reception ==
Nelson Riddle’s biographer, Peter J. Levinson, said, "[T]he most beautiful album that Nelson ever arranged in his entire career was The Wonderful World of Antonio Carlos Jobim, recorded in 1965. It is really the inner workings of the Jobim/Riddle combination—the tenderness and sensuality that predominated throughout this recording—that revealed how much Nelson and 'Tom' Jobim were soulmates.... Nelson used a mixture of flutes, trombones, and strings to perfectly convey the romanticism of the samba. Jobim's Portuguese and heavily accented English vocals and guitar blended seamlessly with Nelson's arrangements."

John Bush in an AllMusic review was more critical of the album, saying the promising duo was limited by Riddle's "surprisingly safe" arrangements and Jobim's "quavering vocals." Still, Bush commended Jobim's subtle interpretation on songs like "Dindi" and "A Felicidade" and called "She's a Carioca" a cheerful sequel to "The Girl from Ipanema."

Professional ratings
Review scores
Source	Rating
Allmusic	link

== Track listing ==
All music composed by Antonio Carlos Jobim, lyricists indicated

1. "She's a Carioca" (Vinicius de Moraes, Ray Gilbert) –2:38
2. "Água de Beber" (de Moraes, Gimbel) –2:29
3. "Surfboard" –2:24
4. "Useless Landscape" (Gilbert, Aloísio de Oliveira) –2:18
5. "Só Tinha de Ser Com Você" (Oliveira) –2:29
6. "A Felicidade" (de Moraes) –2:07
7. "Bonita" (Gene Lees) –2:09
8. "Favela" (de Moraes) –2:37
9. "Valsa de Pôrto das Caixas" –3:22
10. "Samba do Avião" –2:13
11. "Por Toda a Minha Vida" (de Moraes) –1:51
12. "Dindi" (Gilbert, Oliveira) –2:35

== Personnel ==
- Antônio Carlos Jobim — piano, guitar
- Nelson Riddle — arranger/conductor
