= Love, Strings and Jobim =

Compilation album by Various artists
- Released: 1966
- Recorded: 1966
- Genre: Latin Jazz, Bossa Nova
- Length: 30:30
- Label: Warner Bros.
- Producer: Aloísio de Oliveira, Ray Gilbert

Professional ratings
Review scores
Source	Rating
Allmusic	3/5 stars

Love, Strings and Jobim is a 1966 album by various Brazilian artists who play new Brazilian songs by various composers. Because Antônio Carlos Jobim is pictured on the cover and mentioned in the title, he has been and continues to be credited to be the performing artist on the album. Jobim does not appear on the album except as a composer of two of the twelve songs. The original Brazilian title of this album is "Tom Jobim Apresenta" and it appeared on the Elenco label.

== Track listing ==
1. "Eu Preciso de Você" ("Hurry Up and Love Me") (Ray Gilbert, Antônio Carlos Jobim, Aloísio de Oliveira) –2:21
2. "Preciso Aprender a Ser Só" ("If You Went Away") (Gilbert, Marcos Valle) –3:09
3. "Seu Encanto" ("The Face I Love") (Gilbert, Carlos Pingarilho, Valle) –2:13
4. "Tristeza de Nós Dois" ("The Sight of You") (Bebeto, Durval Ferreira, Gilbert, Valentino Mauricio) –3:17
5. "Razão de Viver" ("Tears") (Eumir Deodato) –2:44
6. "Berimbau" (Vinicius de Moraes, Gilbert, Baden Powell de Aquino) –3:26
7. "Samba Torto" ("Pardon My English") (Gilbert, Jobim, Oliveira) –1:57
8. "Chuva" ("Rain") (Carargo, Ferreira, Gilbert) –2:18
9. "Você" ("You") (Roberto Menescal) –2:15
10. "Imagem" ("Image") (Luiz Eça, Gilbert, Oliveira) –1:35
11. "Morrer de Amor" ("I Live to Love You") (Oscar Castro-Neves, Luverci Fiorini, Gilbert) –2:55
12. "A Morte de Um Deus de Sal" ("Neptune's Hep Tune") (Ronaldo Bôscoli, Gilbert, Menescal) –2:13

== Personnel ==
- Lindolpho Gaya − arranger, conductor
- Eumir Deodato – arranger, piano
- Edison Machado – drums
- Sérgio Barroso − bass
- Oscar Castro-Neves − acoustic guitar
- Mauricio Einhorn − harmonica
- Jorge Ferreira da Silva − alto saxophone, flute
