= Elis & Tom =

Studio album by Elis Regina and Antônio Carlos Jobim
- Released: 1974
- Recorded: February 22–March 9, 1974
- Studios: MGM Studios in Los Angeles, California, United States
- Genre: Bossa nova
- Length: 37:46
- Labels: Philips (Original 1974 LP); Trama/Universal Music (30th Anniversary Edition); Verve Records (United States release); Decca (United Kingdom release)
- Producers: Aloysio de Oliveira (Original 1974 edition); Cesar Camargo Mariano (30th Anniversary Edition)

Elis Regina chronology
Elis (1972)	Elis & Tom (1974)	Falso Brilhante (1976)

Antônio Carlos Jobim chronology
Jobim (1973)	Elis & Tom (1974)	Urubu (1976)

Professional ratings
Review scores
Source	Rating
Allmusic	4.5/5 stars

Elis & Tom is a bossa nova album that was released in 1974 and recorded by Brazilian singer Elis Regina and singer-songwriter Antônio Carlos Jobim.

Recorded over a 16-day period at MGM Studios in Los Angeles, California, the album was an old wish of Regina, who always wanted to record a full album of Jobim's songs with him. This finally came true in 1974, when Elis was celebrating her 10th anniversary as an artist of Philips Records. The label approved the project as a gift for her.

In 2004, the 30th anniversary of the initial release, a remastered special edition was released on DVD Audio which included a 5.1 multi-channel surround mix from the original master tapes.

The production and recording of this album are depicted in the 2022 documentary film Elis & Tom, Só Tinha de Ser com Você, by Roberto de Oliveira and Nelson Motta.

== Reception ==
The Allmusic review by Thom Jurek awards the album 4.5 stars and states that "This beautiful — and now legendary — recording date between iconic Brazilian vocalist Elis Regina and composer, conductor, and arranger Tom Jobim is widely regarded as one of the greatest Brazilian pop recordings."

It was ranked 11th on Rolling Stone's Top 100 Brazilian albums of all time. The album was inducted into the Latin Grammy Hall of Fame in 2007. In September 2012 it was voted by the audience of Radio Eldorado FM, of Estadao.com and of Caderno C2+Música (both the latter belong to newspaper O Estado de S. Paulo) as the fourth-best Brazilian album ever.

== Track listing ==
No.	Title	Writer(s)	Length
1.	"Águas de Março"	Antônio Carlos Jobim	3:32
2.	"Pois É"	Jobim, Chico Buarque	1:43
3.	"Só Tinha de Ser com Você"	Jobim, Aloísio de Oliveira	3:48
4.	"Modinha"	Jobim, Vinícius de Moraes	2:16
5.	"Triste"	Jobim	2:39
6.	"Corcovado"	Jobim	3:56
7.	"O Que Tinha de Ser"	Jobim, de Moraes	1:43
8.	"Retrato em Branco e Preto"	Jobim, Buarque	3:03
9.	"Brigas, Nunca Mais"	Jobim, de Moraes	1:39
10.	"Por Toda a Minha Vida"	Jobim, de Moraes	2:04
11.	"Fotografia"	Jobim	2:46
12.	"Soneto de Separação"	Jobim, de Moraes	2:20
13.	"Chovendo na Roseira"	Jobim	3:11
14.	"Inútil Paisagem"	Jobim, de Oliveira	3:08

30th Anniversary Edition bonus tracks (DVD Audio)
No.	Title	Writer(s)	Length
15.	"Fotografia" (alternative version)	Jobim	4:36
16.	"Bonita"	Jobim	3:07

== Personnel ==
- Elis Regina - vocals
- Antônio Carlos Jobim - vocals (1, 6, 12, 14), piano (4, 6–8, 11–14), arrangement (4), guitar (6)
- César Camargo Mariano - piano (1, 2, 5), electric piano (3, 9, 11, 13), arrangements (except 4)
- Hélio Delmiro - guitar (1, 3, 9), electric guitar (2, 5, 11)
- Oscar Castro-Neves - guitar (1–3, 5, 9, 13)
- Luizão Maia - bass (1–3, 5, 9, 11, 13)
- Paulo Braga - drums (1–3, 5, 9, 11, 13)
- Bill Hitchcock - conductor of string section (1, 6, 8, 10,12)
- Hubert Laws and Jerome Richardson - flute (1, 5, 6, 13; uncredited)
- Chico Batera - percussion (11)
