= Surfboard (disambiguation) =

A surfboard is an elongated platform used in the sport of surfing and windsurfing.

Surfboard may also refer to:

== Music ==
- "Surfboard" (Antônio Carlos Jobim song) a song by Antônio Carlos Jobim and covered by many artists
- "Surfboard" (Cody Simpson song), 2014 single by Cody Simpson

== Other uses ==
- "Surface Transportation Board, U.S. government agency, also known as Surfboard, a short name for the
- Surfboard, a wrestling holding move, also known as a Romera Special
- SURFboard, a trademarked name of cable modem
