= Terra Brasilis =

Studio album by Antônio Carlos Jobim
- Released: 1980
- Recorded: 1979
- Genre: Jazz, bossa nova
- Length: 69:57
- Label: Warner Bros.
- Producer: Aloísio de Oliveira

Antônio Carlos Jobim chronology
Urubu (1976)	Terra Brasilis (1980)	Edu & Tom (1981)

Professional ratings
Review scores
Source	Rating
Allmusic	4/5 stars
The Rolling Stone Jazz Record Guide	3.5/5 stars

Terra Brasilis is the 11th studio album by Antônio Carlos Jobim. It was recorded at the RCA Recording Studios in New York City and released in 1980. The album includes reworkings of old songs as well as new material and placed 42nd on the US Jazz Albums 1980 year-end chart.

== Track listing ==
1. Dreamer (Vivo Sonhando) (Gene Lees) –3:00
2. "Canta Mais (Sing Once More)" (Vinicius de Moraes) –4:32
3. "Olha Maria (Amparo)" –4:04
4. "One Note Samba" (Newton Mendonça) –2:17
5. "Dindi" (Aloísio de Oliveira, Ray Gilbert) –4:13
6. "Quiet Nights of Quiet Stars (Corcovado)" (Lees) –3:26
7. "Marina" –2:41
8. "Desafinado" ("Off Key") (Lees, Mendonça) –3:24
9. "Você Vai Ver" ("You'll See") –2:55
10. "Estrada Do Sol" (Dolores Duran) –2:04
11. "The Girl from Ipanema" (de Moraes, Norman Gimbel) –4:47
12. "Double Rainbow" –4:04
13. "Triste" –3:03
14. "Wave" –3:39
15. "Someone to Light Up My Life" (de Moraes, Gene Lees) –3:03
16. "Falando de Amor" ("Speaking of Love") – 3:39
17. "Two Kites" –4:36
18. "Modinha" (de Moraes) –3:37
19. "The Song of the Sabiá (Sabiá)" (Chico Buarque, Gimbel) –4:04
20. "This Happy Madness (Estrada Branca)" (de Moraes, Lees) –2:49

All songs composed by Antônio Carlos Jobim, lyricists indicated.

== Personnel ==
- Antônio Carlos Jobim – vocals, piano, electric piano, guitar
- Bob Cranshaw – double bass
- Mike Moore – bass
- Pascoal Meirelles – drums
- Grady Tate – drums
- Rubens Bassini – percussion
- Bucky Pizzarelli – guitar
- Claus Ogerman – arranger/conductor
