= Triste (Antônio Carlos Jobim song) =

Song composed by Antônio Carlos Jobim performed by Frank Sinatra

Promotional single by Antônio Carlos Jobim

from the album Wave
- A-side: "Wave"
- Written: 1966
- Released: 1967
- Genre: bossa nova
- Length: 2:09
- Label: A&M
- Songwriter: Antônio Carlos Jobim

"Triste" (Sad) is a bossa nova song composed in 1966 by Antônio Carlos Jobim, who also wrote lyrics for it in both English and Portuguese.

== Background ==
Jobim wrote the song in late 1966 while staying at the Sunset Marquis Hotel in Los Angeles, as he waited for Frank Sinatra to return from a holiday in Barbados so they could begin recording their album Francis Albert Sinatra & Antônio Carlos Jobim (1967).

The first recording of the song was an instrumental version by Jobim for his 1967 album Wave. Sinatra recorded it with Jobim two years later on the sessions for their planned second album, SinatraJobim, which was ultimately released as Side A of Sinatra & Company (1971).

Jobim recorded an English-language vocal version in 1980 on the album Terra Brasilis.

== Recorded versions ==
- Antônio Carlos Jobim - Wave (1967), and Terra Brasilis (1980)
- Sérgio Mendes & Brasil '66 - Equinox (1967)
- Frank Sinatra - Sinatra & Company (rec. 1969, released in 1971)
- Oscar Peterson Trio - Tristeza on Piano (1970)
- Elis Regina & Antônio Carlos Jobim - Elis & Tom (1974)
- João Gilberto - Amoroso (1977)
- Bucky Pizzarelli - Bucky's Bunch (1977)
- Sarah Vaughan - I Love Brazil! (1977)
- Herb Ellis, with Remo Palmier - Windflower (1978)
- Charlie Byrd - Sugarloaf Suite (1979), and The Bossa Nova Years (1991)
- Earl Klugh - Late Night Guitar (1980)
- Stan Getz & Cybill Shepherd - Mad About The Boy (1980)
- Tania Maria - Piquant (1980)
- Ella Fitzgerald - Ella Abraça Jobim (1981)
- Susannah McCorkle - Dream (1987)
- George Shearing & Hank Jones - The Spirit of 176 (1988)
- Stanley Turrentine - More than a Mood (1992)
- Laura Fygi - The Lady Wants to Know (1994)
- Joe Henderson - Double Rainbow: The Music of Antonio Carlos Jobim (1995)
- Lee Konitz - Brazilian Rhapsody (1995)
- Denny Zeitlin Trio - As Long as There's Music (1997)
- Gal Costa - Gal Costa Canta Tom Jobim Ao Vivo (1999)
- Toquinho & Paulinho Nogueira - Toquinho Paulinho Nogueira (1999)
- Dianne Reeves - In the Moment – Live in Concert (2000)
- Sophie Milman - Take Love Easy (2009)
- Kenny Barron - Kenny Barron & The Brazilian Knights (2012)
