= Elis (1972 album) =

Studio album by Elis Regina
- Released: 1972
- Recorded: 1972
- Studio: Phonogram Studio, Rio de Janeiro
- Genre: MPB
- Label: Philips
- Producer: Roberto Menescal

Elis is an album by Brazilian singer Elis Regina released in 1972, and contains such hits as "Bala com Bala", "Nada Será como Antes", "Casa no Campo" and "Atrás da Porta".

It was listed by Rolling Stone Brazil as one of the 100 best Brazilian albums in history.

== Track listing ==
All arrangements written by César Camargo Mariano

1. 20 Anos Blue (Sueli Costa, Vítor Martins) – 3:11
2. Bala com Bala (João Bosco, Aldir Blanc) – 3:12
3. Nada Será como Antes (Milton Nascimento, Ronaldo Bastos) – 2:45
4. Mucuripe (Raimundo Fagner, Antonio Carlos Belchior) – 2:27
5. Olhos Abertos (Zé Rodrix, Guttemberg Guarabyra) – 2:37
6. Vida de Bailarina (Américo Seixas, Dorival Silva) – 2:25
7. Águas de Março (Antonio Carlos Jobim) – 3:05
8. Atrás da Porta (Francis Hime, Chico Buarque de Hollanda) – 2:48
9. Cais (Milton Nascimento, Ronaldo Bastos) – 3:17
10. Me Deixa em Paz (Ivan Lins, Ronaldo Monteiro de Souza) – 2:10
11. Casa no Campo (Zé Rodrix, Tavito) – 2:45
12. Boa Noite Amor (José Maria de Abreu, Francisco Matoso) – 2:23

Bonus track on 2002 Japanese Mercury CD release
13. Entrudo (Carlos Lyra, Ruy Guerra) – 2:47

== Credits ==
- Production director: Roberto Menescal
- Production assistant: Sepé
- Recording technicians: Ary, João and Toninho
- Cutting: Joaquim Figueira
- Photography: José Maria de Melo
- Cover design: Aldo Luiz
