= Billy Blanco =

Brazilian singer, musician and composer (1924–2011)

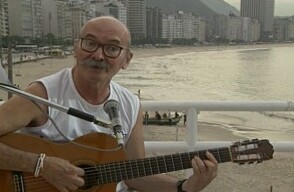

Background information
- Born: William Blanco Abrunhosa Trindade; 8 May 1924; Belém, Pará, Brazil
- Died: 8 July 2011 (aged 87) Rio de Janeiro, Brazil
- Genres: Bossa nova; Samba; MPB
- Occupations: Architect, musician, composer, and writer
- Years active: 1956–2011

William Blanco Abrunhosa Trindade (8 May 1924 – 8 July 2011), commonly known as Billy Blanco, was a Brazilian architect, musician, composer, and writer.

== Early life and education ==
Blanco was born in 1928 in Belém, and is of Spanish descent (Galicia, Northwest of Spain). He had an interest in music since he was a child, composing carefully written out samba music, with elaborate lyrics, subjects, and musical compositions. During the 1940s, as he was studying engineering, he moved to São Paulo to study architecture, enrolling at Mackenzie College in 1946. He later moved to Rio de Janeiro and studied at the University of Architecture and Fine Arts in 1948. He graduated with a degree in architecture in 1950.

== Career ==
Blanco had a unique style, describing his previous experiences either with humor or with exaltation, of experiences of love and disillusionment. Where his syncopatic style of samba, which diverged from contemporary works and grabbed the attention of singers at the time. The first composition of his career was "Pra Variar" in 1951. During the 1950s and 1960s, hit songs of his were recorded by Dick Farney, Lúcio Alves, João Gilberto, Dolores Duran, Sílvio Caldas, Nora Ney, Jamelão, Elizeth Cardoso, Dóris Monteiro, Os Cariocas, Pery Ribeiro, Miltinho, Elis Regina, Miriam Batucada and Hebe Camargo. His first major success was "Estatutos da Gafieira", sung by Inezita Barroso, recorded at RCA Victor studios in 1954.

Among his musical partners were Baden Powell, in "Samba Triste", Tom Jobim, in "Sinfonia do Rio de Janeiro" and João Gilberto, in "Descendo o Morro" e "A Montanha/O Morro", a tribute to the people of the favelas. He and violinist Sebastião Tapajós composed 56 works, and with other composers, wrote about 500 works in total. Of those, about 300 were recorded.

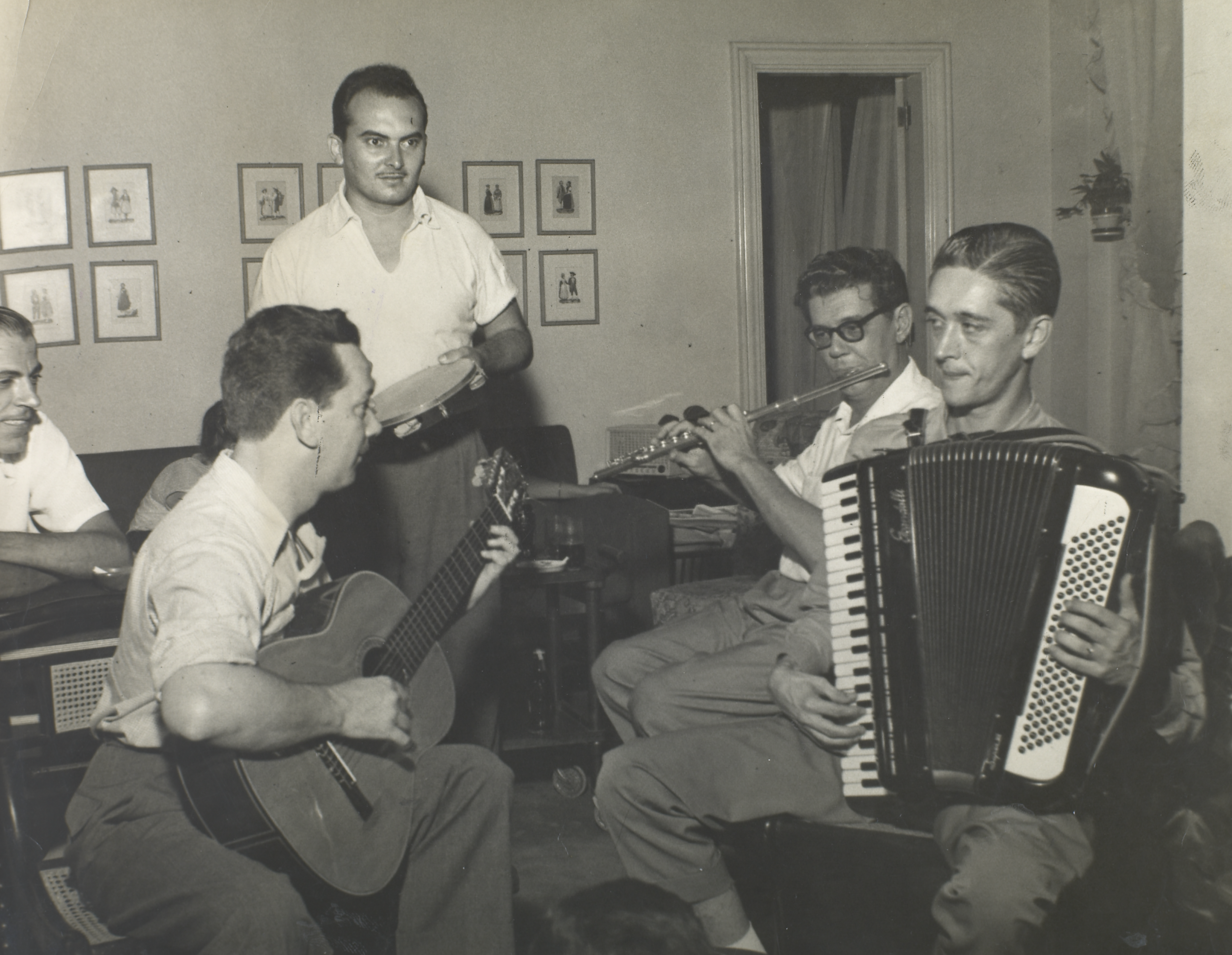
Garoto, Radamés Gnatalli, Chiquinho and Billy Blanco, 1955. Brazilian National Archives.

Among his other hits, they include "Sinfonia Paulistana", "Tereza da Praia", "O Morro", "Estatuto da Gafieira", "Mocinho Bonito", "Samba Triste", "Viva meu Samba", "Samba de Morro", "Pra Variar", "Sinfonia do Rio de Janeiro" and "Canto Livre". "Sinfonia do Rio de Janeiro" is composed of ten songs, written in partnership with Tom Jobim, in 1960. These songs include "Hino ao Sol", "Coisas do Dia", "Matei-me no Trabalho", "Zona Sul", "Arpoador", "Noites do Rio", "A Montanha", "O Morro", "Descendo o Morro" and "Samba do Amanhã".

"Sinfonia Paulistana" was finished in 1974, after 10 years of work. It is made up of 15 songs, sung by, among others, Elza Soares, Pery Ribeiro, Cláudya, Claudette Soares, Nadinho da Ilha, and Miltinho, with chorus provided by the Teatro Municipal de São Paulo. The production was done by Aloysio de Oliveira, with an orchestra led by maestro Chico de Moraes. The songs on the album include "Louvação de Anchieta", "Bartira", "Monções", "Tema de São Paulo", "Capital do Tempo", "O Dinheiro", "Coisas da Noite", "O Céu de São Paulo", "Amanhecendo", "O Tempo e a Hora", "Viva o Camelô", "Pro Esporte", "São Paulo Jovem", "Rua Augusta" and "Grande São Paulo". "Monções" is noted for its carimbó influence, and "O Tempo e a Hora" is a fustion between bossa nova and pop. O Estado de S. Paulo noted the refrain of "Amanhecendo" as "what best defines the people of São Paulo". From 1974 to 2017, the song, the most well known from this album, was part of the soundtrack to Jornal da Manhã, the morning newscast of Rádio Jovem Pan.

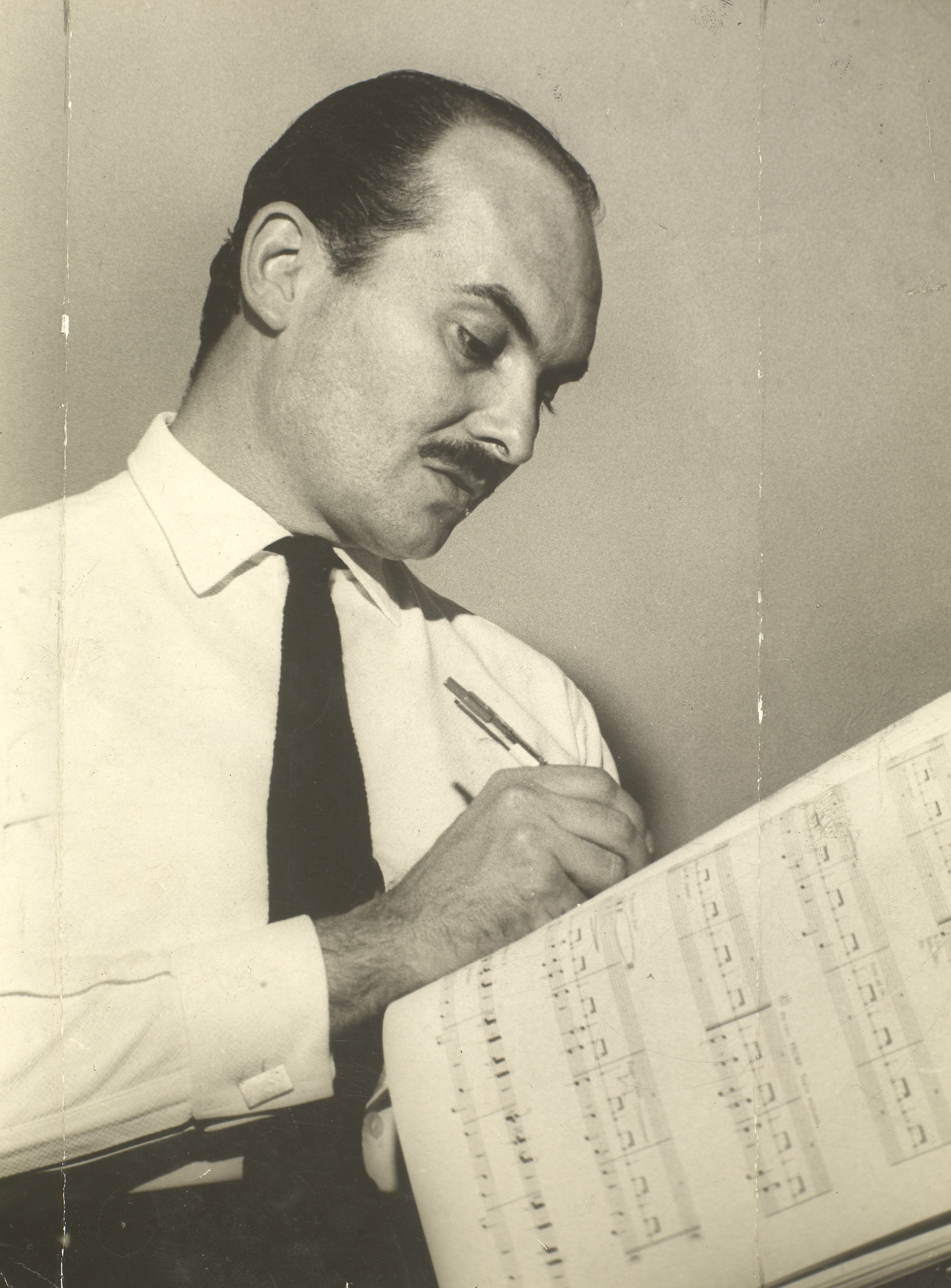
Billy Blanco in 1965.

After briefly spending time at Fort Copacabana during the military dictatorship, Blanco composed "Canto Livre".

In 2009, he accepted the invite of filmmaker Cesar Nero to participate in the production of "Desde o Princípio" with his own song, "Sinfonia Paulistana", about a messenger from the future who arrives in São Paulo to attempt to avert catastrophe. The production included the participation of Antonio Abujamra, Maximira Figueiredo, José Mojica Marins, Mario Gomes, and Chico Anysio.

While keeping the works of this production with Nero and exchanging information, Blanco continued to dedicate himself to gospel music until he suffered a stroke in 2010, being hospitalized in Rio de Janeiro. Despite being in stable condition, he lost all ability to speak. He died on 8 July 2011, at 87 years old.

In 2012, the municipal government of Rio de Janeiro paid tribute to him, giving him name to the Mergulhão Billy Blanco, a construction project at the Trevo das Palmeiras (also known as the Cebolão) in the Barra da Tijuca neighborhood.

== Personal life ==
Blanco is the grandfather of singers Pedro Sol and Lua Blanco.

== Books ==
- MACEDO, Regina Helena – Tirando de Letra e Música – Editora Record – 1996 – 224 pages- ISBN 85-01-04339-7
- MACEDO, Regina Helena – Florentino Dias: uma vida dedicada a música – Editora Record – 96 pages – ISBN 85-01-05652-9
