= Jobim (album) =

Studio album by Antônio Carlos Jobim
- Released: 1973
- Recorded: December 11–13, 1972
- Genres: Jazz, bossa nova
- Length: 46:25
- Labels: MCA (LP); Verve By Request (CD)
- Producer: Claus Ogerman

Antônio Carlos Jobim chronology
Tide (1972)	Jobim (1973)	Elis & Tom (1974)

Professional ratings
Review scores
Source	Rating
AllMusic	2.5/5 stars

Jobim is the eighth studio album by Antônio Carlos Jobim. It was released in 1973. In Brazil, it was released as Matita Perê without the additional English version of Águas de Março (Waters of March).

== Track listing ==
No.	Title	Composer(s)	Length
1.	"Águas de Março (Waters of March)"	Antônio Carlos Jobim	3:58
2.	"Ana Luiza"	Antônio Carlos Jobim	5:28
3.	"Matita Perê"	Antônio Carlos Jobim, Paulo César Pinheiro	7:12
4.	"Tempo Do Mar"	Antônio Carlos Jobim	5:14
5.	"Mantiqueira Range"	Paulo Jobim	3:33
6.	"Themes from the Film Cronica da Casa Assassinada/Trem Para Cordisburgo"	Antônio Carlos Jobim	10:01
7.	"Um Rancho Nas Nuvens"	Antônio Carlos Jobim	4:05
8.	"Nuvens Douradas"	Antônio Carlos Jobim	3:18
9.	"Águas de Março (Waters of March)"	Antônio Carlos Jobim	3:55

The album was arranged, conducted and produced by Claus Ogerman.

== Personnel ==
- Antônio Carlos Jobim – guitar, piano, vocals (tracks 1, 2, 3, 6, 9)
- Harry Lookofsky – tenor violin, concertmaster
- Urbie Green – trombone
- Ray Beckenstein, Phil Bodner, Jerry Dodgion, Don Hammond, Romeo Penque – woodwinds
- Richard Davis, Ron Carter – bass
- Airto Moreira, George Devens, João Palma – percussion
