= Passarim =

Studio album by Antônio Carlos Jobim
- Released: September 1987
- Recorded: Nov 1986–Mar 1987
- Studio: Polygram Studios, Rio de Janeiro
- Genre: Bossa nova, jazz
- Length: 49:15
- Label: Verve
- Producer: Paulo Jobim, Jaques Morelenbaum

Antônio Carlos Jobim chronology
Terra Brasilis (1980)	Passarim (1987)	Inédito (1987)

Professional ratings
Review scores
Source	Rating
AllMusic	4.5/5 stars
The New Rolling Stone Album Guide	4/5 stars
Los Angeles Times	5/5 stars

Passarim is a studio album by Antônio Carlos Jobim, released by Verve Records in 1987.

== Recording ==
Jobim recorded Passarim around the same time as Inédito and used the same musicians, his touring and recording group called A Banda Nova (The New Band). Members included Jobim's wife Ana, his son Paulo, and his daughter Elizabeth, as well as close friends Jaques and Paula Morelenbaum, and Danilo Caymmi and his wife Simone. On the back cover and some center labels, Passarim is credited to "Antonio Carlos Jobim and The New Band."

== Critical reception ==
Passarim has mostly received positive reviews.

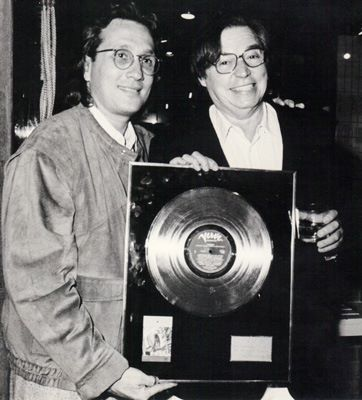
Tom Jobim (right) receiving the Gold Record for the album Passarim from manager Alberto Traiger (left), 1987.

When the album initially came out, Leonard Feather gave it his highest recommendation in a Los Angeles Times review, saying, "The godfather of the bossa nova has not lost his touch. . . . Jobim is still the best interpreter of his own compositions. Particularly charming is the wittily auto-biographical 'Chansong,' describing his return to the United States. . . . Here, in short, is the bossa nova in its pristine, unspoiled state."

In another contemporaneous review, Musician magazine offered mixed criticism of the album: "Passarim is [Jobim's] first solo effort in years, and you'd think he might have picked up some wisdom in this interlude, but here he is again, still trying to get by on songwriting gifts alone. Not that he doesn't occasionally pull it off. . . . I guarantee your resistance will fall to the charm of the record's best compositions. The dipping and soaring title cut, the self-parodic 'Chansong' and the vintage 'Luiza' all testify to Jobim's winning way with a melody. Too bad Passarim also showcases Jobim's penchant for the sprawling ('Gabriela') and forgettable (uh, 'Bebel,' I think it's called)."

More recently, Richard S. Ginell at AllMusic praised the album, calling it, "Jobim's major statement of the '80s. . . . The title song is one of Jobim's most haunting creations, a cry of pain about the destruction of the Brazilian rain forest that resonates in the memory for hours. . . . [T]his music repays repeated listening -- particularly the extended suite from Jobim's score for the film Gabriela."

Music critic Ben Ratliff, in a listening session with jazz guitarist Pat Metheny for The New York Times, also praised the title song, calling it "a three-and-a-half minute condensed masterpiece." Metheny responded, "It's so much more than a tune. This is really like composition. . . . [It's] so advanced. The beauty of the harmony-major triads moving down throughout this whole thing, with different kinds of voices. Plus, all that glue, melodic glue; it never stops, from the first note to the end. Where are we now? We're almost two minutes into the track, where nothing has repeated yet. I mean, that's advanced the way Paul Bley is advanced. There's a connection there."

In Musicians & Composers of the 20th Century, Matthew Nicholl hailed the album as a "masterpiece" and said that while Passarim was "not well-known in the United States, [it] contains some of Jobim's greatest songs and themes."

== Track listing ==
Thirteen songs were recorded for Passarim, including English and Portuguese-language versions of the title track and "Looks Like December/Anos Dourados." The original U.S. CD version contained all 13 tracks, with the two Portuguese versions listed as Bonus Tracks. Most new versions of the album follow this track listing.

All songs written by Antônio Carlos Jobim, except where noted.

=== Original CD Version (U.S.) ===
1. "Passarim" - 3:36 (English version)
2. "Bebel" - 3:11
3. "Borzeguim"– 4:23
4. "Looks Like December" (A.C. Jobim, Chico Buarque) - 3:45
5. "Isabella" (Gil Goldstein, Paulo Jobim) – 3:22
6. "Fascinatin' Rhythm" (George Gershwin, Ira Gershwin) - 2:10
7. "Chansong" – 3:18
8. "Samba do Soho" (Ronaldo Bastos, P. Jobim) - 2:59
9. "Luiza" – 2:32
10. "Brazil Nativo" (Paulo César Pinheiro, Danilo Caymmi) – 3:51
11. "Gabriela" (A.C. Jobim, Jararaca) – 7:56

Bonus Tracks

12. "Anos Dourados" (A.C. Jobim, Buarque) – 3:46
13. "Passarim" – 3:36 (Portuguese version)

=== Original Album (English/Portuguese versions) ===
The original vinyl album was released in two different versions that contained only 11 tracks. Track order was the same on both versions but included either the English or Portuguese-language renditions of "Passarim" and "Looks Like December/Anos Dourados."

Side A

1. "Passarim" (English or Portuguese version)
2. "Bebel"
3. "Borzeguim"
4. "Looks Like December" or "Anos Dourados"
5. "Isabella"
6. "Fascinatin' Rhythm"

Side B

1. "Chansong"
2. "Samba do Soho"
3. "Luiza"
4. "Brazil Nativo"
5. "Gabriela"

== Personnel ==
Musicians

- Antônio Carlos Jobim – piano and vocals, lead vocals (1–4, 6–7, 9, 11, 13), arrangement (6)
- Paulo Jobim – guitar and vocals, lead vocal (5, 8), arrangements (1, 5, 7, 13)
- Danilo Caymmi – flute and vocals, lead vocal (10)
- Jaques Morelenbaum – cello, arrangements (3, 9, 10)
- Sebastião Neto – bass
- Paulo Braga – drums
- Ana Lontra Jobim – vocals
- Elizabeth Jobim – vocals
- Maúcha Adnet – vocals
- Paula Morelenbaum – vocals
- Simone Caymmi – vocals
- Chico Buarque – lead vocal (12)
- Rubens Ohana de Miranda - percussion (2, 8, 10)

Production

- Paulo Jobim – Musical producer
- Jaques Morelenbaum – Musical producer
- Elizabeth Jobim – Cover painting
