= Surfboard (Antônio Carlos Jobim song) =

Single by Antônio Carlos Jobim

from the album The Wonderful World of Antonio Carlos Jobim
- Released: 1965
- Songwriter(s): Antônio Carlos Jobim

"Surfboard" is an instrumental song by Antônio Carlos Jobim. The song was composed by Jobim on Ipanema beach after buying a surfboard for his son. Initially released on his US album The Wonderful World of Antonio Carlos Jobim in 1965, the song was re-recorded by Jobim for the albums A Certain Mr. Jobim (1967) with Claus Ogerman and 1995's Antonio Brasileiro.

The song had been performed by many artists on their albums but did not appear as a single until 1969 when it was recorded by Brazilian keyboardist Walter Wanderley for the album When It Was Done. The song was also recorded by Herbie Mann in 1996. Being an instrumental composition, Surfboard has no lyrics but was recorded vocally in a scat singing version by the Swingle Singers on Mood Swings 2003.
