= Tide (album) =

Studio album by Antônio Carlos Jobim
- Released: Early November 1970
- Recorded: March 16, April 23–24 and 29, 1970; May 8, 20 and 22, 1970
- Studio: Van Gelder Studio, Englewood Cliffs
- Genre: Jazz, bossa nova
- Length: 35:49 original LP; 57:00 CD reissue
- Label: A&M SP 3031
- Producer: Creed Taylor

Antônio Carlos Jobim chronology
Stone Flower (1970)	Tide (1970)	Jobim (1972)

Professional ratings
Review scores
Source	Rating
AllMusic	3/5 stars

Tide is the seventh album by Antônio Carlos Jobim, released in 1970 on A&M Records and arranged by Eumir Deodato.

== Track listing ==
All tracks written by Antônio Carlos Jobim except where noted.

1. "The Girl from Ipanema" (Vinicius de Moraes, Norman Gimbel, Antônio Carlos Jobim) – 4:53
2. "Carinhoso" (Pedro Berrios, João de Barro, Pixinguinha) – 2:49
3. "Tema Jazz" – 4:36
4. "Sue Ann" – 3:05
5. "Remember" – 4:04
6. "Tide" – 4:06
7. "Takatanga" – 4:44
8. "Caribe" – 2:44
9. "Rockanalia" – 4:48

Bonus tracks on CD reissue

10. "Tema Jazz" [Alternate Take] – 2:58
11. "Tide" [Alternate Take] – 4:09
12. "Tema Jazz" [Alternate Take] – 5:49
13. "Tema Jazz" [Master Take in Full] – 8:15

== Personnel ==
- Antônio Carlos Jobim – piano, electric piano, guitar
- Jerry Dodgion – alto saxophone solo (1)
- Marvin Stamm, Burt Collins – trumpet
- Hubert Laws, Romeo Penque – flute
- Hermeto Pascoal – flute solo (3)
- Joe Farrell – flute, bass flute (2, 8), soprano saxophone solo (8)
- Joseph DeAngelis, Ray Alonge – French horn
- Garnett Brown, Urbie Green – trombone
- Ron Carter – double bass
- João Palma – drums
- Everaldo Ferreira – congas
- Airto Moreira – percussion
- Deodato – piano, arranger, conductor

Strings

- Frederick Buldrini, Max Polikoff, David Nadien, Matthew Raimondi, Harry Katzman, Emanuel Green, Harry Lookofsky – violin
- Al Brown, Harold Coletta – viola
- Charles McCracken, George Ricci – cello
