= Urubu (album) =

Studio album by Antônio Carlos Jobim
- Released: November 1976
- Recorded: October 16–23, 1975
- Genre: Bossa nova, jazz, classical music
- Length: 37:14
- Label: Warner Bros.
- Producer: Claus Ogerman

Antônio Carlos Jobim chronology
Elis & Tom (1974)	Urubu (1976)	Terra Brasilis (1980)

Professional ratings
Review scores
Source	Rating
Allmusic	4.5/5 stars

Urubu is the ninth album by Antônio Carlos Jobim.

== Track listing ==
1. "Bôto (Porpoise)" (Antônio Carlos Jobim, Jararaca) – 6:07
2. "Ligia" – 4:13
3. "Correnteza" (Antônio Carlos Jobim, Luiz Bonfá) – 2:41
4. "Angela" – 2:50
5. "Saudade do Brasil" – 7:27
6. "Valse" (Paulo Jobim) – 3:14
7. "Arquitetura de Morar (Architecture to Live)" – 8:08
8. "O Homem (Man)" – 2:31

All songs composed by Antônio Carlos Jobim, except where indicated. The album was arranged/conducted/produced by Claus Ogerman.

== Personnel ==
- Antônio Carlos Jobim – piano, electric piano, guitar, vocals
- Ron Carter – double bass
- João Palma – drums
- Miucha – vocals on song #1 "Bôto"
- Claus Ogerman – arranger/conductor/producer
