= Dindi =

Portuguese-language song by Antônio Carlos Jobim

Song by Sylvia Telles
- Recorded: 1959
- Genre: Bossa nova, jazz standard
- Composer: Antônio Carlos Jobim
- Lyricists: Aloysio de Oliveira (Portuguese); Ray Gilbert (English)

"Dindi" (Portuguese pronunciation: [dʒĩˈdʒi]) is a song composed by Antônio Carlos Jobim, with lyrics by Aloysio de Oliveira. It is a world-famous bossa nova and jazz standard song. Jobim wrote this piece especially for the Brazilian singer Sylvia Telles. "Dindi" is a reference to a farm named "Dirindi", in Brazil, a place that Jobim and his friend/collaborator Vinicius de Moraes used to visit (according to Helena Jobim, his sister, in her book Antonio Carlos Jobim - Um Homem Iluminado).

Telles was the first singer to record this song in Portuguese, in 1959. This song was re-recorded by Telles in December 1966, together with the guitarist Rosinha de Valença.

Céu, tão grande é o céu
E bandos de nuvens que passam ligeiras
Prá onde elas vão, ah, eu não sei, não sei.

== English version ==
English lyrics were added by Ray Gilbert:

"Sky so vast is the sky / with faraway clouds just wandering by / Where do they go / oh I don't know."

Both Jobim and Astrud Gilberto recorded Dindi with English lyrics in 1965.

== Discography ==
- Sylvia Telles - Amor de Gente Moça (Musicas de Antonio Carlos Jobim) (1959),Amor em Hi-Fi (1960)
- Sylvia Telles, Edu Lobo, Trio Tamba, Quinteto Villa-Lobos - Reencontro (1965)
- Astrud Gilberto - The Astrud Gilberto Album (1965), Jazz Masters 9 (1993)
- Frank Sinatra and Antonio Carlos Jobim - Francis Albert Sinatra & Antonio Carlos Jobim (1967)
- Elza Soares - Un Show de Elza (1965)
- Joe Pass - A Sign of the Times (1965)
- Morgana King - It's a Quiet Thing (1965)
- Charlie Byrd - Brazilian Byrd (1966)
- Baden Powell - Poema on Guitar (1967)
- Blossom Dearie - Soon It's Gonna Rain (1967), Discover Who I Am: Blossom Dearie in London (The Fontana Years: 1966-1970) (2023)
- Claudine Longet - Love is Blue (1968)
- Quarteto em Cy (as the Girls from Bahia) - Revolucion con Brasilia (1968)
- Ronnie Von - A Misteriosa Luta do Reino de Parassempre Contra o Império de Nuncamais (1969)
- Wayne Shorter - Super Nova (1969)
- Victor Assis Brasil - Toca Antonio Carlos Jobim (1970)
- Willie Bobo - Hell of an Act to Follow (1978), Do What You Want to Do... (2006)
- Flora Purim - Butterfly Dreams (1973)
- Eric Gale - Forecast (1973)
- Jon Lucien - Song for My Lady (1975)
- Norman Connors with Jean Carn - Saturday Night Special (1975)
- Sarah Vaughan - Copacabana (1979)
- The Singers Unlimited - The Singers Unlimited with Rob McConnell and the Boss Brass (1980)
- Antonio Carlos Jobim - Terra Brasilis (1980)
- Ella Fitzgerald - Ella Abraça Jobim (1981)
- Shirley Horn - Softly (1987)
- Eliane Elias - Eliane Elias Plays Jobim (1990) and Brazilian Classics (2003)
- Kate Ceberano - Like Now (1990)
- Karrin Allyson - Sweet Home Cookin' (1994)
- Lee Konitz & The Brazilian Band - Brazilian Serenade (1996)
- Natalie Cole - Stardust (1996)
- Lee Ritenour - A Twist of Jobim (1997) and World of Brazil (2005), sung by El DeBarge
- Bonnie & Francois - Summertime (1998)
- Bola Sete – Ocean Memories (1999)
- Jane Monheit - Never Never Land (2000)
- The David Liebman Group - The Unknown Jobim (2001)
- Ivan Lins - Jobiniando (2001)
- Rebecca Martin - Middlehope (2001)
- Carmen McRae - At Ratso's, Vol 1 Live (2002)
- Seela Misra (with TOrcH) - Sounds for Staying Home (2002)
- Meja - Mellow (2004)
- Gary Husband - Aspire (2004)
- Johnny Mathis - Isn't It Romantic: The Standards Album (2005)
- Pedro Aznar - Aznar Canta Brasil- Disco 2 Dindi (2005)
- Diane Hubka - I Like it Here - Live in Tokyo (2007)
- Daniel Matto - I'm Old Fashioned (2010)
- Mina - Stessa spiaggia, stesso mare (1963),L'allieva (2005)
- Mike Catalano featuring Ivan Lins - A Manhattan Affair (2008)
- Magos Herrera - Distancia (2009)
- Sitti Navarro - Contagious (2009)
- Yeahwon Shin - Yeahwon (2010)
- Lauren Henderson - Lauren Henderson (2011)
- Karen Souza - Hotel Souza (2012)
- NOVA (band featuring Laura Vall and David Irelan) (2012)
- Avi Wisnia - Catching Leaves (2021)

== See also ==
- List of bossa nova standards
