= Wave (Antônio Carlos Jobim album) =

Studio album by Antônio Carlos Jobim
- Released: October 1967
- Recorded: May 22–24 and June 15, 1967
- Studio: Van Gelder Studio, Englewood Cliffs, New Jersey
- Genre: Jazz, bossa nova
- Length: 31:38
- Label: A&M
- Producer: Creed Taylor

Antônio Carlos Jobim chronology
A Certain Mr. Jobim (1967)	Wave (1967)	Stone Flower (1970)

Wave is the fifth studio album by Brazilian bossa nova musician Antônio Carlos Jobim, released in 1967 on A&M Records. Recorded in the US with mostly American musicians, it peaked at number 114 on the Billboard 200 chart, as well as number 5 on the Jazz Albums chart.

Wave was arranged and conducted by Claus Ogerman, and features jazz musicians including trombonists Urbie Green and Jimmy Cleveland, flautist Jerome Richardson, and bassist Ron Carter, as well as a string section.

Photographer Pete Turner created the solarized cover photo of a giraffe. He took the picture in 1964 while capturing images of the Amboseli National Park; he did not originally intend to photograph the animal, but it walked into his framing and he clicked it. The original cover's red and purple shades were already present in the picture and Turner enhanced them later at the laboratory.

== Reception ==
Professional ratings
Review scores
Source	Rating
AllMusic	5/5 stars

In a 2014 review, Richard S. Ginell of AllMusic praised the album for "Wave" and "Triste" (deeming them two "instant standards") and its "absolutely first-rate tunes... that escaped overexposure and thus sound fresh today." He concluded, "one only wishes that this album were longer; 31:45 is not enough." Chris May, in a review on All About Jazz, said Claus Ogerman's simple string arrangements added to the "modern appeal" through "vivid evocation of a long-gone time and place." He added, "as jazz, Wave has no more authenticity than its cover shot suggesting an African giraffe traversing a Brazilian beach, but it remains an elegant and delightful album." A review on Tiny Mix Tapes said, "with Wave....you'll find repeated listening will become a must."

In 2007, Rolling Stone Brasil magazine ranked Wave number 92 in "Os 100 Maiores Discos da Música Brasileira" (The 100 greatest Brazilian music records). Guitar Player magazine included it on their list of The 40 Greatest Guitar Albums Of 1967.

== Track listing ==
All tracks are written by Antônio Carlos Jobim.

No.	Title	Length
1.	"Wave"	2:56
2.	"The Red Blouse"	5:09
3.	"Look to the Sky"	2:20
4.	"Batidinha"	3:17
5.	"Triste"	2:09
6.	"Mojave"	2:27
7.	"Diálogo"	2:55
8.	"Lamento"	2:46
9.	"Antigua"	3:10
10.	"Captain Bacardi"	4:29

== Personnel ==
Credits adapted from liner notes.

- Antônio Carlos Jobim – piano, guitar, harpsichord, vocals
- Claus Ogerman – arranger, conductor
- Urbie Green – trombone
- Jimmy Cleveland – trombone
- Raymond Beckenstein – bass flute, flute, piccolo
- Romeo Penque – bass flute, flute, piccolo
- Jerome Richardson – bass flute, flute, piccolo
- Joseph Singer – French horn
- Ron Carter – double bass
- Dom Um Romão – drums
- Bobby Rosengarden – drums
- Claudio Slon – drums

Strings

- Bernard Eichen – violin
- Lewis Eley – violin
- Paul Gershman – violin
- Emanuel Green – violin
- Louis Haber – violin
- Julius Held – violin
- Leo Kruczek – violin
- Harry Lookofsky – violin
- Joseph Malignaggi – violin
- Gene Orloff – violin
- Raoul Poliakin – violin
- Irving Spice – violin
- Louis Stone – violin
- Abe Kessler – cello
- Charles McCracken – cello
- George Ricci – cello
- Harvey Shapiro – cello

Production

- Sam Antupit – album design
- Pete Turner – photography

== Charts ==
Chart	Peak position
US Billboard 200	114
US Jazz Albums (Billboard)	5
