= Stone Flower (album) =

Studio album by Antônio Carlos Jobim
- Released: July 7, 1970
- Recorded: March 16, April 23, 24, 29 and May 8, 20, 22, 1970
- Studios: Van Gelder Studio, Englewood Cliffs
- Genres: Jazz, bossa nova
- Length: 33:47
- Label: CTI
- Producer: Creed Taylor

Antônio Carlos Jobim chronology
Wave (1967)	Stone Flower (1970)	Tide (1970)

Professional ratings
Review scores
Source	Rating
AllMusic	4.5/5 stars

Stone Flower is the sixth studio album by Brazilian composer Antônio Carlos Jobim. The album was recorded in March, April, and May 1970 by Rudy Van Gelder at Van Gelder Studios and produced by Creed Taylor, with arrangements and conducting by Eumir Deodato. The album was released on July 7 on CTI Records.

== Track listing ==
All tracks composed by Antônio Carlos Jobim, except where noted.

1. "Tereza My Love" – 4:24
2. "Children's Games" – 3:30
3. "Choro" – 2:10
4. "Brazil" (Ary Barroso) – 7:25
5. "Stone Flower" – 3:21
6. "Amparo" – 3:41
7. "Andorinha" – 3:32
8. "God and the Devil in the Land of the Sun" – 2:23
9. "Sabiá" (lyrics by Chico Buarque) – 3:58
10. "Brazil" [alternate take] – 5:25

Track 10 only available on CD reissue.

== Personnel ==
- Antônio Carlos Jobim – piano, electric piano, guitar, vocals (tracks 4 & 9)
- Harry Lookofsky – violin
- Joe Farrell – soprano saxophone
- Urbie Green – trombone
- Hubert Laws – flute
- Ron Carter – double bass
- João Palma – drums
- Airto Moreira – percussion
- Everaldo Ferreira – percussion
- Eumir Deodato – guitar, arranger

== Charts ==
Chart (1971)	Peak position
US Billboard 200	196
US Jazz Albums (Billboard)	18
