= The Composer of Desafinado Plays =

The Composer of Desafinado, Plays

Studio album by Antônio Carlos Jobim
- Released: Late August 1963
- Recorded: 9 and 10 May 1963
- Studios: A&R Studios, New York, NY
- Genres: Latin jazz, bossa nova
- Length: 35:10
- Label: Verve
- Producer: Creed Taylor

Antônio Carlos Jobim chronology
The Composer of Desafinado, Plays (1963)	The Wonderful World of Antonio Carlos Jobim (1964)

Professional ratings
Review scores
Source	Rating
AllMusic	4.5/5 stars
The Rolling Stone Jazz Record Guide	2/5 stars

The Composer of Desafinado, Plays is the first album by Antônio Carlos Jobim. Released in 1963, the album features a dozen instrumentals arranged by Claus Ogerman, whose work would mark the beginning of a lifelong musical relationship with Jobim. Of these twelve songs, nearly all of them are jazz standards. The opening track, "The Girl from Ipanema", is believed to be the second most recorded song in history behind The Beatles' "Yesterday," and a recording of the song by Astrud Gilberto and Stan Getz became a worldwide hit in 1964.

Jobim plays both guitar and piano on the album, the latter of which producers resisted because they wanted to present the image of the Latin man and his guitar, which is evident from the album cover itself. Jobim, in a 1988 interview on NPR's Fresh Air with Terry Gross, recalled this struggle with American producers:

...when I got to the stage, they wouldn't let me play piano here. You know, they said, listen, Antonio, you've got to be the Latin lover. You should play the guitar. You know, if you play the piano you destroy the whole image, you know? So I've been playing guitar for many, many years, you know, which was let's say my second instrument. That was an instrument that I used to play by ear, you know?

The album was inducted into the Latin Grammy Hall of Fame in 2001. In 2007, Rolling Stone Brasil ranked it number 58 in "Os 100 Maiores Discos da Música Brasileira" (The 100 greatest Brazilian music records). Pete Welding of Down Beat said, "If the bossa nova movement had produced only this record, it would already be fully justified."

== Track listing ==
All songs written by Antônio Carlos Jobim, lyricists indicated. This album contains all-instrumental versions of these tunes.

1. "The Girl from Ipanema" (Vinicius de Moraes, Norman Gimbel) — 2:42
2. "Amor em Paz" ("Once I Loved") (Vinicius de Moraes) — 3:36
3. "Agua de Beber" (Vinicius de Moraes, Norman Gimbel) — 2:50
4. "Vivo Sonhando" — 2:35
5. "O Morro Não Tem Vez" (Vinicius de Moraes) — 3:20
6. "Insensatez" (Vinicius de Moraes) — 2:53
7. "Corcovado" — 2:25
8. "One Note Samba" (Jon Hendricks, Newton Mendonça) — 2:14
9. "Meditation" (Norman Gimbel, Newton Mendonça) — 3:15
10. "Só Danço Samba" (Vinicius de Moraes) — 2:21
11. "Chega de Saudade" (Vinicius de Moraes) — 4:19
12. "Desafinado" (Newton Mendonça) — 2:44

== Personnel ==
- Antônio Carlos Jobim - piano, guitar
- George Duvivier - double bass
- Edison Machado - drums
- Leo Wright - flute
- Jimmy Cleveland - trombone (tracks: 3, 4, 9, 12)
- String section (tracks: 1–12, except 3, 5, 8, 10)
- Claus Ogerman - string arrangements, conducting
