= Claus Ogerman =

German arranger, conductor, and composer (1930–2016)

Background information
- Born: Klaus Ogermann; 29 April 1930; Ratibor, Germany
- Died: 8 March 2016 (aged 85)
- Genres: Jazz; pop; classical
- Occupations: Composer; conductor; arranger
- Instrument: Piano
- Years active: 1950s–2016
- Labels: United Artists, Warner Bros., Decca

Claus Ogerman (born Klaus Ogermann; 29 April 1930 – 8 March 2016) was a German arranger, conductor, and composer best known for his work with Billie Holiday, Antonio Carlos Jobim, Frank Sinatra, Bill Evans, Michael Brecker, Michael Franks, Barbra Streisand, and Diana Krall.

== Life and work ==
Born in Ratibor (Racibórz), Upper Silesia, Germany (now part of Poland), Ogerman began his career with the piano. He was one of the most prolific 20th century arrangers and has worked in the top 40, rock, pop, jazz, R&B, soul, easy listening, Broadway and classical music fields. The exact number of recording artists for whom Ogerman has either arranged or conducted during his career has never been determined.

In the 1950s, Ogerman worked in Germany as an arranger-pianist with Kurt Edelhagen, saxophonist and bandleader Max Greger, and Delle Haensch. Claus (then Klaus) also worked as a part-time vocalist and recorded several 45 rpm singles under the pen name of "Tom Collins", duetting with Hannelore Cremer; he also recorded a solo vocal with the Delle Haensch Jump Combo.

In 1959, Ogerman moved to the United States and joined the producer Creed Taylor at Verve Records, working on recordings with many artists, including Antonio Carlos Jobim, Bill Evans, Wes Montgomery, Kai Winding, and Cal Tjader. Verve was sold to MGM in 1963. Ogerman, by his own reckoning in Gene Lees' Jazzletter publication, arranged some 60-70 albums for Verve under Creed Taylor's direction from 1963 to 1967.

During this time he also arranged many pop hits, including Solomon Burke's "Cry To Me", and Lesley Gore's "It's My Party", "Judy's Turn to Cry", "She's a Fool", and "Maybe I Know". In 1966, Ogerman arranged and conducted Bill Evans Trio with Symphony Orchestra (Verve Records). In 1967, he joined Creed Taylor on the A&M/CTi label. Ogerman charted under his own name in 1965; the RCA single "Watusi Trumpets" reached #130 in the Music Vendor charts.

He arranged and conducted the orchestra on George Benson's 1976 album, Breezin', as well as on two other Benson albums. Ogerman won the 1980 Grammy Award for Best Instrumental Arrangement for George Benson's "Soulful Strut" and the 2010 Grammy Award for Best Instrumental Arrangement Accompanying Vocalist(s) for "Quiet Nights". Among Ogerman's most remarkable albums are: Gate Of Dreams (WB, 1977), from the music of the ballet Some Times; Cityscape with Michael Brecker (Warner/Pioneer, 1982); and Claus Ogerman Featuring Michael Brecker (GRP, 1991), all of which include original compositions centered on the juxtaposition of jazz instruments and rhythm sections with classical music orchestra.

Ogerman arranged and conducted Diana Krall's 2001 album The Look of Love, and conducted parts of her Live in Paris performance recorded on DVD. He also served as arranger and conductor for Krall's 2009 album Quiet Nights.

== Classical compositions ==
From the 1970s, Ogerman devoted himself almost exclusively to composing. His commissions included a ballet score for the American Ballet Theatre, Some Times; a work for Bill Evans for jazz piano and orchestra, Symbiosis; a work for Michael Brecker for saxophone and orchestra, Cityscape; a song cycle, Tagore-Lieder, after poems by Rabindranath Tagore, recorded by Judith Blegen and Brigitte Fassbaender; a concerto for violin and orchestra, Lirico, and a Sarabande-Fantasie for violin and orchestra, recorded by Aaron Rosand; 10 Songs for Chorus A-Capella After Poems by Georg Heym, recorded by the Cologne Radio Chorus; and a work for violin and orchestra, Preludio and Chant, recorded by Gidon Kremer. His works for violin and piano were recorded on a 2007 disc by the Chinese violinist Yue Deng and French pianist Jean-Yves Thibaudet. In July 2008, Ogerman released an album of compositions with jazz pianist Danilo Perez, Across the Crystal Sea.

Ogerman's major influences as a composer were Max Reger and Alexander Scriabin. He steadfastly maintained that he was not primarily concerned with "modernism" per se, stating that his goal was to evoke an emotional response in the listener.

== Work with Antonio Carlos Jobim ==
Ogerman arranged and conducted Francis Albert Sinatra & Antonio Carlos Jobim (1967), the first of two recordings that Frank Sinatra made with Antonio Carlos Jobim. Ogerman also arranged and conducted Jobim's The Composer of Desafinado, Plays (1963), A Certain Mr. Jobim (1967), Wave (1967), Jobim (1972), Urubu (1976), and Terra Brasilis (1980), on which he also played the piano. Ogerman also produced the Jobim and Urubu albums.

== Filmography as composer ==
- The Old Forester House (1956)
- Weißer Holunder (1957)
- Eine verrückte Familie (1957)
- Liebe, wie die Frau sie wünscht (1957)
- I Was All His (1957)
- Die Unschuld vom Lande (1957)
- Die Prinzessin von St. Wolfgang (1957)
- Seine Hoheit war ein Mädchen (1958)
- Bimbo the Great (1958)
- All the Sins of the Earth (1958)
- Love, Girls and Soldiers (1958)
- Sin Began with Eve (1958) (American re-edited version 1962: The Bellboy and the Playgirls)
- $100 a Night (1959)
- Girls for the Mambo-Bar (1959)
- A Summer You Will Never Forget (1959)
- Looking for Love (1964)

== Discography ==
- Music From The Roaring 20's (United Artists, 1961, reissued in 1967 as It's Charleston Time)
- Jeder Singt Mit! (United Artists, 1962) – as Klaus Ogermann
- Soul Searchin' (RCA Victor, 1965)
- Watusi Trumpets (RCA Victor, 1965)
- Saxes Mexicanos (RCA Victor, 1966)
- Latin Rock (RCA Victor, 1967)
- Gate of Dreams (Warner Bros., 1977)
- Aranjuez (CBS, 1978) with Jan Akkerman
- Cityscape (Warner Bros., 1982) with Michael Brecker
- Preludio & Chant, Elegia, Symphonic Dances (EMI, 1982) with Gidon Kremer and the London Symphony Orchestra
- Claus Ogerman featuring Michael Brecker (GRP, 1991) with Michael Brecker
- Symphonic Dances / Some Times (Ballet) (Bay City, 1992) with the New York Studio Symphony Orchestra
- Lyrical Works (EMI, 1997)
- Two Concertos (Decca, 2001)
- Works for Violin & Piano (Decca, 2007) featuring Yue Deng (violin) and Jean-Yves Thibaudet (piano)

=== Compilations ===
- The Man Behind the Music (Boutique, 2002) - 4CD featuring various artists

=== as arranger/conductor ===
With Ed Ames

- Opening Night with Ed Ames (RCA Victor, 1964)

With George Benson

- Breezin' (Warner Bros., 1976)
- In Flight (Warner Bros., 1977)
- Livin' Inside Your Love (Warner Bros., 1979)

With Solomon Burke

- "Cry to Me" (Atlantic, 1962)

With Donald Byrd

- Up with Donald Byrd (Verve, 1965)

With Betty Carter

- 'Round Midnight (Atco, 1963)

With Sammy Davis Jr.

- The Nat King Cole Songbook (Reprise, 1965)
- Sammy's Back on Broadway (Reprise, 1965)

With Bill Evans

- Plays the Theme from The V.I.P.s and Other Great Songs (MGM, 1963)
- Bill Evans Trio with Symphony Orchestra (Verve, 1965)
- Symbiosis (MPS, 1974) - composed by Ogerman

With Eddie Fisher

- "Now I Know" (RCA Victor, 1967)

With Connie Francis

- "Your Other Love" (MGM, 1963)
- "In the Summer of His Years" (MGM, 1963)
- "You Know You Don't Want Me" (MGM, 1964)
- Connie Francis Sings Bacharach & David (MGM, 1968 - and producer)

With Michael Franks

- Sleeping Gypsy (Warner Bros., 1977)

With Stan Getz

- Reflections (Verve, 1963)
- Voices (Verve, 1967)
- What the World Needs Now: Stan Getz Plays Burt Bacharach and Hal David (Verve, 1968)

With Astrud Gilberto

- The Shadow of Your Smile (Verve, 1965)

With João Gilberto

- Amoroso (Warner Bros., 1977)

With João Donato

- The New Sound of Brazil: Piano of João Donato (RCA Victor, 1965)

With Lesley Gore

- I'll Cry If I Want To (Mercury, 1963)
- "Maybe I Know" (Mercury, 1964)
- "Look of Love" (Mercury, 1964)

With Stephane Grappelli

- Uptown Dance (CBS, 1978)

With Al Hirt

- That Honey Horn Sound (RCA Victor, 1965)

With Billie Holiday

- Lady in Satin (Columbia, 1958)

With Johnny Hodges

- Sandy's Gone (Verve, 1963)

With Freddie Hubbard

- The Love Connection (Columbia, 1979) - and producer

With Willis Jackson

- 'Gator Tails (Verve, 1964)

With Antônio Carlos Jobim

- The Composer of Desafinado Plays (Verve, 1963)
- A Certain Mr. Jobim (Warner Bros., 1967)
- Wave (A&M, 1967)
- Jobim (MCA, 1973) - and producer
- Urubu (Warner Bros., 1976) - and producer
- Terra Brasilis (Warner Bros., 1980) - and piano

With Dr. John

- City Lights (Horizon, 1978)

With Wynton Kelly

- Comin' in the Back Door (Verve, 1963)

With Ben E. King

- Ben E. King Sings for Soulful Lovers (Atco, 1962)
- Don't Play That Song! (Atco, 1962)

With Diana Krall

- The Look of Love (Verve, 2001)
- Quiet Nights (Verve, 2009)

With Wes Montgomery

- Tequila (Verve, 1966)
- Willow Weep for Me (Verve, 1969)

With Danilo Perez

- Across the Crystal Sea (EmArcy, 2008)

With Oscar Peterson

- Motions and Emotions (MPS, 1969) - and producer

With Frank Sinatra

- Francis Albert Sinatra & Antonio Carlos Jobim (Reprise, 1967) with Antônio Carlos Jobim
- The World We Knew (Reprise, 1967)

With Jimmy Smith

- Any Number Can Win (Verve, 1963)
- Who's Afraid of Virginia Woolf? (Verve, 1964))

With Barbra Streisand

- Stoney End (Columbia, 1971)
- Classical Barbra (Columbia, 1973 [1976]) - conductor and producer

With Cal Tjader

- Warm Wave (Verve, 1964)

With Mel Tormé

- "Comin' Home Baby" (Atlantic, 1962)

With Stanley Turrentine

- Nightwings (Fantasy, 1977)
- West Side Highway (Fantasy, 1978)

With Kai Winding

- Soul Surfin' (Verve, 1963)
- Kai Winding (Verve, 1963)
- Mondo Cane #2 (Verve, 1964)

== See also ==
- List of music arrangers
- List of jazz arrangers
