= Os Cariocas =

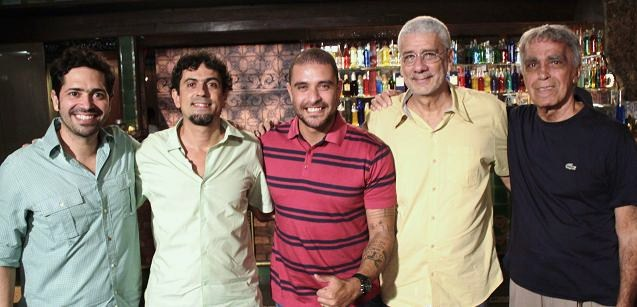
- Os Cariocas is a vocal ensemble, created by Ismael Neto in 1942, whose repertoire is Brazilian popular music (MPB). In the photo, in the company of the samba composer and singer, Diogo Nogueira.

Background information
- Origin: Rio de Janeiro
- Genre: MPB
- Years active: 1942–present
- Labels: Continental Music, Sinter, RCA Victor, Columbia, Mocambo, Philips, Som Livre, WEA, Vitória Régia Discos, Paradoxx Music, Albatroz, Columbia Sony Music
- Members: Severino Filho, Eloi Vicente, Neil Carlos Teixeira, Fabio Luna.
- Past members: Ismael Neto, Ari Mesquita, Salvador, Tarquínio, Badeco, Waldir Viviani, Quartera, Luiz Roberto, Edson Bastos, Hernane Castro.
- Website: OsCariocas.com.br

Os Cariocas are a Brazilian popular music band. The band was first founded in 1942 by two brothers, Ismael Netto and Severino Filho, and continues to perform today (with new members).

== Discography ==
- 1957 : Os Cariocas A Ismael Netto with Ismael Netto (Columbia)
- 1962 : A bossa dos Cariocas (Philips)
- 1963 : Mais bossa com Os Cariocas (Philips)
- 1964 : A grande bossa dos Cariocas (Philips)
- 1965 : Os Cariocas de quatrocentas bossas (Philips)
- 1965 : Introducing the Cariocas (Philips)
- 1966 : Artes & vozes (Philips)
- 1966 : Passaporte (Polydor)
- 1990 : Minha namorada (Som Livre)
- 1991 : Reconquistar (WEA)
- 1997 : A bossa brasileira (Estúdio Eldorado)
- 1997 : Amigo do rei - Tim Maia & Os Cariocas (Vitória Régia Music)
- 2002 : Os clássicos Cariocas (Albatroz Music)
- 2004 : Bossa Carioca (Sony Music)
- 2010 : Nossa Alma Canta (Guanabara Records)
- 2013 : Estamos aí (Biscoito Fino)
- 2015 : Um Encontro No Au Bon Gourmet (Recorded live in 1962) - Tom Jobim, Vinicius de Moraes, João Gilberto, Os Cariocas (Doxy)
