= Wave (Antônio Carlos Jobim song) =

1967 bossa nova standard by Antônio Carlos Jobim

Composition by Antônio Carlos Jobim

from the album Wave
- Language: Portuguese
- Released: 1967
- Recorded: May–June, 1967
- Studio: Van Gelder Studio, Englewood Cliffs, New Jersey, U.S.
- Genre: Bossa Nova
- Length: 2:58
- Label: A&M
- Songwriter: Antônio Carlos Jobim
- Producer: Creed Taylor

"Wave" (or "Vou Te Contar" in Portuguese; lit. transl. "I am going to tell you") is a bossa nova and jazz standard song written by Antônio Carlos Jobim. Recorded as an instrumental on his 1967 album of the same name, its English lyrics were written by Jobim himself later that year.

However, the version by Sérgio Mendes & Brasil '66 was the first release of the tune, sung by Lani Hall with Mendes on their second album, Equinox, in 1967.

The English lyrics were used on the February 11, 1969, recording by Frank Sinatra, on his 1970 album Sinatra & Company. They were also used by Johnny Mathis in his 1970 album Close to You.

"Wave" was voted the 73rd greatest Brazilian song by the Brazilian edition of Rolling Stone magazine.

According to The Jazz Discography by Tom Lord, the song has been recorded nearly 500 times by jazz artists.

== Notable recordings ==
- Antonio Carlos Jobim, Wave (1967) and Antonio Carlos Jobim and Friends (1993)
- Elis Regina with Toots Thielemans, Honeysuckle Rose Aquarela Do Brasil (1969)
- Oscar Peterson, Motions and Emotions (1969); arrangement by Claus Ogerman)
- Paul Desmond, Live (1976)
- João Gilberto, Amoroso (1977)
- Fred Hersch and Bill Frisell, Songs We Know (1998)
- Ahmad Jamal, The Awakening (1970)
- Frank Sinatra and Antonio Carlos Jobim, Sinatra & Company (1970)
- McCoy Tyner with Ron Carter and Tony Williams, Supertrios (1977)
- Sarah Vaughan, Live in Japan (1973)
- Eliane Elias, Fantasia (1992) and Brazilian Classics (2003)
- Leon Thomas and Gary Bartz, Precious Energy (1990)
- Roberto Carlos and Caetano Veloso, Roberto Carlos e Caetano Veloso e a Música de Tom Jobim (2008)
- Carminho, Carminho canta Tom Jobim (2016)
- Daniel Jobim and Luiza Jobim, Páginas da Vida (Brazilian TV series) (2006)
