= Milton Banana =

Brazilian drummer (1935–1999)

Milton Banana (born Antônio de Souza; 23 April 1935 – 22 May 1999) was a Brazilian bossa nova and jazz drummer. A self-taught musician, he is best known for his collaborations with João Gilberto and Stan Getz and for his work with the trio he founded.

== Discography ==
Year	Label	Album	Format
1958	Odeon	Chega de Saudade (João Gilberto)	LP/CD
1962	Polydor	Muito à Vontade (João Donato e Seu Trio)	LP/CD
1963	Audio Fidelity	O ritmo e o som da bossa nova	LP
1964		O Lp	LP
1965	Odeon	Vê	LP
1965	Odeon	Os Originais	LP
1966	Odeon	Balançando com Milton Banana Trio	LP
1967	Odeon	O som do Milton Banana Trio	LP
1968	Odeon	O Trio	LP
1968	Odeon	Milton Banana Trio	LP
1969	Odeon	Milton Banana Trio	LP
1971	Odeon	Milton Banana	LP
1972	Odeon	Milton Banana	LP
1974	Odeon	Milton Banana	LP
1975	Odeon	Milton Banana	LP
1976	Odeon	Balançando, 2	LP
1977	RCA	Samba é isso	LP
1978	RCA	Samba é isso Vol, 2	LP
1979	RCA	Ao Meu Amigo Chico (Samba é isso) Vol, 3	LP
1980	RCA	Ao Meu Amigo Tom (Samba é isso) Vol, 4	LP
1981	RCA	Ao Meu Amigo Vinicius (Samba é isso) Vol, 5	LP
1983	RCA	No Balanço	LP
1984	RCA	Linha de Passe	LP
