= Antônio Brasileiro =

Studio album by Antônio Carlos Jobim
- Released: December 11, 1994
- Recorded: September 1993 – January 1994
- Genre: Jazz, bossa nova
- Label: Columbia
- Producer: Paulo Jobim, Daniel Jobim

Antônio Carlos Jobim chronology
Miúcha e Tom Jobim (1994)	Antônio Brasileiro (1994)	Tom Jobim (1998)

Professional ratings
Review scores
Source	Rating
AllMusic	4/5 stars

Antônio Brasileiro is the fifteenth album by Antônio Carlos Jobim. It was released days after his death in 1994. The album was completed 11 months before his death, and was a critical and commercial success. The album was awarded the 1995 Grammy Award for Best Latin Jazz Album.

== Track listing ==
1. "Só Danço Samba"
2. "Piano Na Mangueira"
3. "How Insensitive" ("Insensatez") (featuring Sting)
4. "Querida"
5. "Surfboard"
6. "Samba de Maria Luiza"
7. "Forever Green"
8. "Maracangalha"
9. "Maricotinha"
10. "Pato Preto"
11. "Meu Amigo Radamés"
12. "Blue Train" ("Trem Azul")
13. "Radamés Y Pelé"
14. "Chora Coração"
15. "Trem de Ferro"

Guest vocalists:

- Sting on "How Insensitive"
- Maria Luiza Jobim on "Samba de Maria Luiza" and "Forever Green"
- Dorival Caymmi on "Maricotinha"
- Maucha Adnet
