= Luiz Eça =

Brazilian pianist (1936–1992)

- Born: Luís Mainzl da Cunha Eça; April 3, 1936; Rio de Janeiro, Brazil
- Died: May 24, 1992 (aged 56)
- Genres: Bossa nova, samba
- Occupation: Musician
- Instrument: Piano
- Years active: 1960s–1980s
- Label: A&M
- Formerly of: Tamba Trio

Luís Mainzl da Cunha Eça (April 3, 1936 – May 24, 1992) was a samba and bossa nova pianist from Rio de Janeiro, Brazil, who was a member of the Tamba Trio with Helcio Milito and Bebeto Castilho. Trained as a classical pianist, Eça created a formal, but stunning approach to bossa nova classics such as "The Hill" by Antonio Carlos Jobim and works by Edu Lobo. His song "The Dolphin" is considered a jazz standard and has been recorded by Stan Getz, Bill Evans, and Denny Zeitlin. The Tamba 4 group included Otávio Bailly, who replaced Bebeto.

== Discography ==
- Cada Qual Melhor! (Odeon, 1961)
- Rio (Columbia, 1964)
- Bossa Nova for Swingin' Lovers (London Globe, 1965)
- Luiz Eca & Cordas (Philips, 1964)
- Brazil 70 (Philips, 1970)
- Piano e Cordas Volume II (Elenco, 1970)
- Luiz Eça & Sagrada Familia - Onda nova do Brasil (Vampisoul, 1970)
- Vanguarda (Odeon, 1972)
- Antologia do Piano (Philips, 1976)
- Patapio Silva (Funarte, 1980)
- Luiz Eca (Carmo, 1983)
- Triangulo (Carmo, 1985)
- Pra Tanto Viver (Continental, 1986)
- Ensemble, Duas Suites Instrumentais de Luiz Eca (Cantabile, 1988)
- Encontro Marcado (Line, 1992)
- No Museu de Arte Moderna (Imagem, 1993)
