= Waters of March =

Brazilian song

"Águas de Março"

Song
- Language: Brazilian Portuguese
- English title: "Waters of March"
- Published: 1972
- Genre: Bossa nova
- Songwriter: Antônio Carlos Jobim

"Waters of March" (Portuguese: "Águas de Março" [ˈaɡwɐz dʒi ˈmaʁsu]) is a Brazilian song composed by Antônio Carlos Jobim (1927–1994) in 1972. Jobim wrote both the original Portuguese and the English lyrics. The lyrics do not tell a story, but rather present a series of images that form a collage; nearly every line starts with "É..." ("It is..."). In 2001, "Águas de Março" was named as the all-time best Brazilian song in a poll of more than 200 Brazilian journalists, musicians and other artists conducted by Brazil's leading daily newspaper, Folha de S.Paulo. It was also voted by the Brazilian edition of Rolling Stone as the second greatest Brazilian song after "Construção" by Chico Buarque.

The inspiration for "Águas de Março" came from Rio de Janeiro's rainiest month. March is typically marked by sudden storms with heavy rains and strong winds that cause flooding in many places around the city. The lyrics and the music have a constant downward progression much like the water torrent from those rains flowing in the gutters, which typically would carry sticks, stones, bits of glass, and almost everything and anything. Following the success of "Waters of March" in the 1970s, the song was adapted for use in a series of advertisements for Coca-Cola in the 1980s. These ended with the then current slogan "Coke Is It".

== Lyrics ==
In both the Portuguese and English versions of the lyrics, "it" is a stick, a stone, a sliver of glass, a scratch, a cliff, a knot in the wood, a fish, a pin, the end of the road, and many other things, although some specific references to Brazilian culture (festa da cumeeira, garrafa de cana), flora (peroba do campo), folklore and fauna (Matita Pereira) were intentionally omitted from the English version, perhaps with the goal of providing a more universal perspective. All these details swirling around the central metaphor of the cascading "waters of March" can give the impression of the passing of daily life and its continual, inevitable progression towards death, just as the rains of March mark the end of a Brazilian summer. Both sets of lyrics speak of "the promise of life," perhaps allowing for other, more life-affirming interpretations, and the English contains the additional phrases "the joy in your heart" and the "promise of spring," a seasonal reference that would be more relevant to most of the English-speaking world.

When writing the English lyrics, Jobim endeavored to avoid words with Latin roots, which resulted in the English version having more verses than the Portuguese. Nevertheless, the English version still contains some words from Latin origin, such as promise, dismay, plan, pain, mountain, distance and mule. Another way in which the English lyrics differ from the Portuguese is that the English version treats March from the perspective of an observer in the northern hemisphere. In this context, the waters are the "waters of defrost" in contrast to the rains referred to in the original Portuguese, marking the end of summer and the beginning of the colder season in the Southern Hemisphere.

Composer-guitarist Oscar Castro-Neves said that Jobim told him writing in this kind of stream of consciousness was his version of therapy and saved him thousands in psychoanalysis bills.

== Certifications ==
Certifications for "Águas de Março"
Region	Certification	Certified units/sales
Spain (Promusicae)	Gold	30,000^{‡}
^{‡} Sales+streaming figures based on certification alone.

== Versions ==
- The first recording of this song (Portuguese version) appeared on an EP released in May, 1972, named O Tom de Antonio Carlos Jobim e o Tal de João Bosco. This EP was released as a bonus included in the Brazilian periodical O Pasquim and was never reissued again.
- Brazilian singer Elis Regina recorded a version of this song later that same year for her 1972 album Elis.
- In 1974, Elis Regina and Antonio Carlos Jobim recorded a duet of the song as the opening track of the album Elis & Tom, which would later be called "the definitive recording".
- Art Garfunkel performed an English version of the song on his 1975 album Breakaway.
- Gloria (2013) has a scene with "Águas de Março" performed by Hugo Moraga and other musicians.
- The Worst Person in the World (2021) includes the 1975 Art Garfunkel rendition during the last scene and end credit sequence. In 2025, the film Nirvanna the Band the Show the Movie replicated this with the Susannah McCorkle rendition, although director Matt Johnson claimed during a Q&A that the choice was inspired by the 2002 documentary Comedian he and collaborator Jay McCarrol saw, predating both films in its usage of ending a movie with the song.
- As part of their An Octave Apart theatre show and studio album, Justin Vivian Bond and Anthony Roth Costanzo covered the song as a duet in 2021.
- London based punk band Fat White Family's 2024 song "Visions of Pain" uses the same vocal melody and list structure as "Waters of March" with altered lyrics and a different instrumental.
- This song was also performed by Cibo Matto as "Aguas De Marco" on their album Super Relax from 1996.
- An English cover was released by John Roseboro (singer) and Mei Semones in 2023.

== See also ==
- List of jazz standards
