= Ray Gilbert =

American lyricist (1912–1976)

Ray Gilbert (September 5, 1912 – March 3, 1976) was an American lyricist. He grew up in Hartford, Connecticut. He married Janis Paige in 1962.

== Career ==
Gilbert is best remembered for the lyrics to the Oscar-winning song "Zip-a-Dee-Doo-Dah" from the 1946 film Song of the South, which he wrote with Allie Wrubel in 1947. He also wrote American English lyrics for the songs in the 1944 film The Three Caballeros featuring Donald Duck. He wrote the lyrics for Paul Nero's composition The Hot Canary, and also wrote the English lyrics of the Andy Williams' 1965 hit, "...and Roses and Roses", and "Lost in Your Love" with Sidney Miller, to music by Bert Jay. He also wrote the English-language lyrics for a number of songs composed by Antonio Carlos Jobim, including "Dindi," ""Amor em Paz" ("Once I Loved"), and "Inútil Paisagem" ("Useless Landscape"/"If You Never Come to Me").

== Personal life and death ==
He married actress and singer Janis Paige in 1962 until his death in 1976 at age 63. He was survived by Paige and by his daughter from a previous marriage, actress and singer Joanne Gilbert.
