= Aloísio de Oliveira =

Brazilian musician (1914–1995)

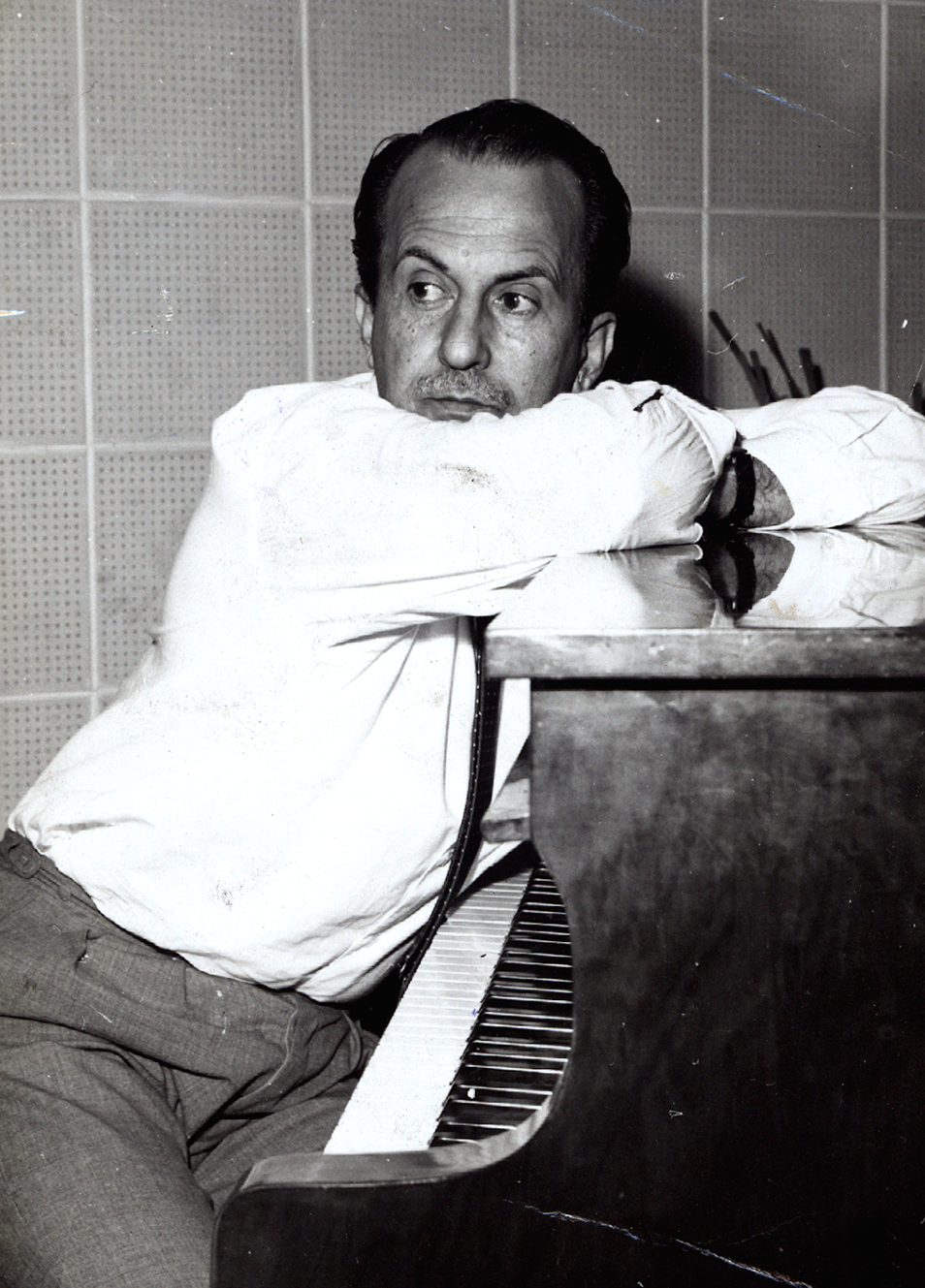

Background information
- Born: December 30, 1914; Rio de Janeiro, Brazil
- Died: February 4, 1995 (aged 80) Los Angeles, Califórnia
- Genres: Samba, Bossa Nova
- Occupations: Record producer, singer, actor, Brazilian composer
- Labels: Odeon Records, Decca Records, RCA Victor, Elenco, Som Livre, Warner Music
- Formerly of: Bando da Lua

Aloísio or Aloysio de Oliveira (December 30, 1914 – February 4, 1995), also known as Louis Oliveira, was a Brazilian record producer, singer, actor and composer. A key figure in the internationalization of Brazilian popular music, he contributed to Carmen Miranda's career abroad with his own musical ensemble: Bando da Lua, which he founded in 1929 with Hélio Jordão Pereira, Afonso Osório, Stênio Osório, Armando Osório, Osvaldo Éboli, Ivo Astolfi, Diego Astolfi and some other cousins of the latter for a total of 12 people. With the death of Miranda in August 1955 the group disbanded. Back in Brazil, Aloísio directed the command of Odeon Records, then created his own record label: the Elenco, producing dozens of discs and launching important names of bossa nova as Tom Jobim.

== Biography ==
Aloísio graduated in dentistry, but never practiced this profession. From an early age, he had a strong relationship with music. In 1929, Aloísio joined Bando da Lua band and already in 1931 the group recorded their first album 78 rpm, in which he sang one of the two tracks, samba Tá de Mona.

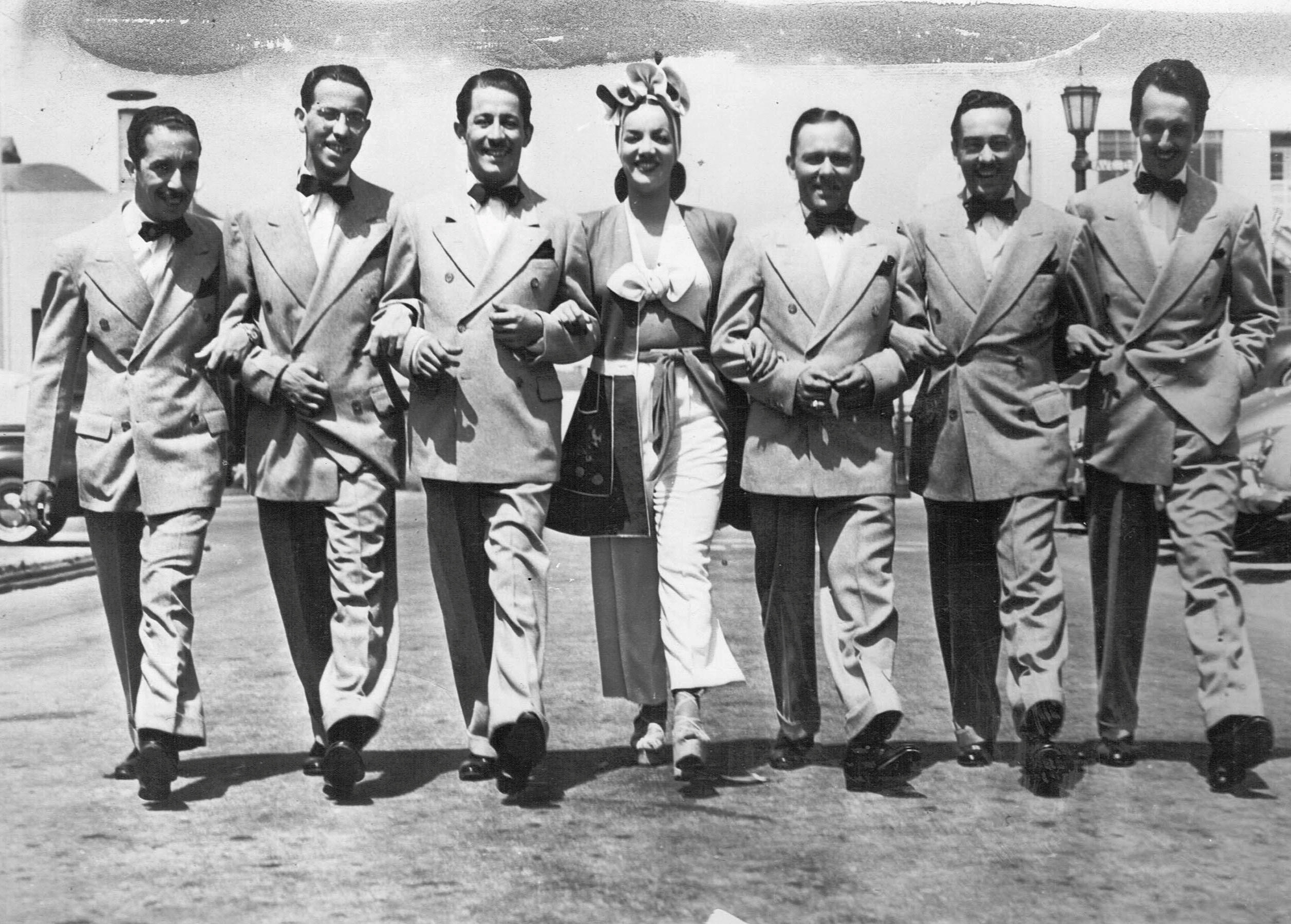
Carmen Miranda and the members of the musical group Bando da Lua (from left to right: Zé Carioca, Vadico, Nestor Amaral, Afonso, Stenio and Aloísio de Oliveira).

Later, in 1939, he traveled to the United States with his group to accompany Carmen Miranda (with whom he had a brief relationship). In the 1940s, he began working with Walt Disney soundtracks as a consultant (helped create the character Zé Carioca), narrating documentaries and like cartoon voice actor (the lines in Portuguese of Captain Hook in Peter Pan are written by him).

In Saludos Amigos, he sang "Aquarela do Brasil" (Ary Barroso). In The Three Caballeros, he took part as actor and also to the soundtrack. In addition, he directed the Bando da Lua in its new phase, from 1949 until its end, six years later, with the death of Carmen Miranda in August 1955.

After Miranda's death, Aloísio returned to Brazil, where he worked as artistic director of Odeon Records (now EMI Records) and acted in Radio Mayrink Veiga, with Aurora Miranda and Vadico. In 1959, he was responsible for launching the LP Chega de Saudade, João Gilberto, landmark of bossa nova. The following year, he transferred to the Philips Records (now Universal Music), remaining there for eight months. In 1963 he married Sylvia Telles, singer launched by him and who produced albums, and founded his own record label: Elenco, specializing in high artistic quality discs.

Aloísio launched several artists in solo albums, as Edu Lobo, Nara Leão, Nana Caymmi, Vinicius de Moraes (as a singer) – indeed the first LP of Elenco was "Vinicius & Odette Lara" – in addition to producing albums anthologies, as Caymmi Visita Tom, Vinicius & Caymmi Zum Zum in, Edu & Bethania, Maysa (live at Au Bon Gourmet), among others. It was also in the 1960s that he composed many famous songs in partnership with Tom Jobim, as Dindi, Só Tinha de Ser com Você, Inútil Paisagem, Eu Preciso de Você, among others.

In 1968, when the "Elenco" was extinguished, Aloísio went back to the US, where he produced Brazilian artists discs at Warner Music. In 1972 he returned to his country, working as a music producer on various labels such as Odeon, RCA Victor and Som Livre. Eleven years later, in 1983, he published the memoir "De Banda pra Lua" (Editora Record).

== Personal life ==
Aloísio married for the first time in 1944, with an American, Nora, who worked as a secretary at Disney Company, with whom he had an only daughter, Luise. His second marriage was with another American, Nikky Walker. In 1963, he married the Brazilian singer Sylvia Telles, launched by him. He married later with Cyva singer (Quarteto em Cy), and also maintained a brief romance with Carmen Miranda in the late 1930s and early 1940s. About his relationship with singer, Aloísio said in an interview to Jornal do Brasil in 1988: "We were very young at the time, but then we were great friends until the end of her life." His last marriage was to Margot Brito, and lasted until his death in 1995.

== Death ==
Aloísio de Oliveira died on February 4, 1995, in Los Angeles, where he had lived the last years of life, from lung cancer at the Hospital Saint Joseph Medical Center where he had been admitted for treatment since November 1994.

== Filmography ==
Year	Title	Role	Note
1935	Estudantes	Himself	(Bando da Lua)
1935	Allô, Allô, Brasil!	Himself	(Bando da Lua)
1936	Alô Alô Carnaval	Himself	(Bando da Lua)
1939	Banana da Terra	Himself	(Bando da Lua)
1940	Down Argentine Way	Himself	(Bando da Lua)
1941	That Night in Rio	Himself	(Bando da Lua)
1941	Week-End in Havana	Himself	(Bando da Lua)
1942	Springtime in the Rockies	Himself	(Bando da Lua)
1942	Saludos Amigos		Voice: "Aquarela do Brasil"
1944	The Three Caballeros		Associated Supervisor / choreographer: live action sequences
1950	Nancy Goes to Rio	Himself	(Bando da Lua)
1950	Cinderella	Grand Duke	Voice: Brazilian version
1953	Scared Stiff	Himself	(Bando da Lua)
1953	Peter Pan	captain Hook	Voice: Brazilian version
1955	Lady and the Tramp	Tramp	Voice: Brazilian version
1961	One Hundred and One Dalmatians	Collie	Voice: Brazilian version
1963	The Sword in the Stone	narrator	Voice: Brazilian version
1973	Robin Hood	The Rooster	Voice: Brazilian version
1977	The Many Adventures of Winnie the Pooh	Tigger	Voice: Brazilian version
1995	Carmen Miranda: Bananas is My Business	Himself	

== Bibliography ==
Oliveira, Aloysio. De banda pra lua (in Portuguese). [S.l.]: Editora Record, 1983. OCLC 10183935.
