= Antônio Carlos Jobim =

Brazilian composer and musician (1927–1994)

Tom Jobim
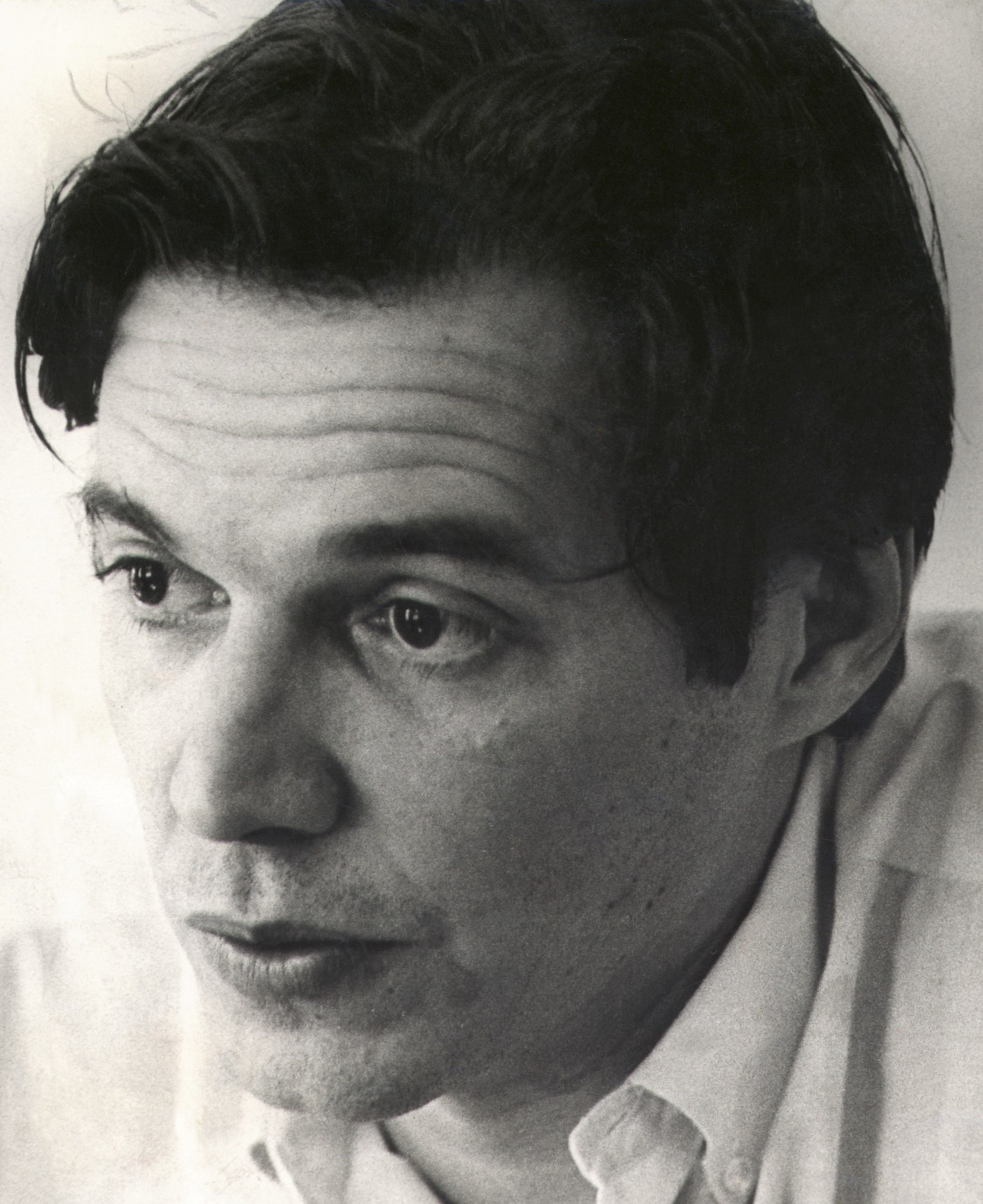
- Jobim in 1967

Background information
- Also known as: Antônio Carlos Jobim, Tom Jobim, Tom do Vinícius
- Born: Antônio Carlos Brasileiro de Almeida Jobim; 25 January 1927; Rio de Janeiro, Brazil
- Died: 8 December 1994 (aged 67) New York City, U.S.
- Genre: Bossa nova
- Occupations: Musician; composer; songwriter; singer
- Instruments: Piano; guitar; flute; vocals
- Years active: 1945–1994
- Labels: Verve, Warner Bros., Elenco, A&M, CTI, MCA, Philips, Decca, Sony

Antônio Carlos Brasileiro de Almeida Jobim (25 January 1927 – 8 December 1994), also known as Tom Jobim (Brazilian Portuguese pronunciation: [ˈtõ ʒoˈbĩ]), was a Brazilian composer, pianist, guitarist, songwriter, arranger and singer. Jobim is considered a great exponent of Brazilian music and one of the fathers of bossa nova for having merged samba with cool jazz in the 1960s as a pioneer of the genre. He is also regarded as one of the most celebrated songwriters of the 20th century, and his compositions have been played and recorded by many singers and instrumentalists internationally since the early 1960s.

Jobim is best known for his composition "Garota de Ipanema (The Girl from Ipanema)", which has been recorded over 240 times by other artists, and is believed to be one of the most recorded popular songs in history. Along with "Garota de Ipanema", many of Jobim's compositions are included in jazz and pop standard repertoires. Several of these compositions are featured on the 1964 album Getz/Gilberto, which won the Grammy Awards for Best Jazz Instrumental Album – Individual or Group, Best Engineered Album, Non-Classical, and was the first jazz record to win Album of the Year. The recording of "Garota de Ipanema" that features on this album also won Record of the Year when released as a single. His 1967 album with Frank Sinatra, Francis Albert Sinatra & Antônio Carlos Jobim, was nominated for Album of the Year in 1968 and album Antônio Brasileiro was awarded the 1995 Grammy Award for Best Latin Jazz Album.

== Early life ==
Antônio Carlos Jobim was born at 23:15 BRT on 25 January 1927 in the middle-class district of Tijuca in Rio de Janeiro. His father, Jorge de Oliveira Jobim (São Gabriel, Rio Grande do Sul; 1889–1935), was a writer, diplomat, professor and journalist. He came from a prominent family, being the great-nephew of José Martins da Cruz Jobim, senator, privy councillor and physician of Emperor Dom Pedro II. While studying medicine in Europe, José Martins added Jobim to his last name, paying homage to the village where his family came from in Portugal, the parish of Santa Cruz de Jovim, Porto. Antônio's mother, Nilza Brasileiro de Almeida (c. 1910–1989), was of partly indigenous descent from northeastern Brazil. Brasileiro de Almeida was only 16 years old when she gave birth to Antônio Carlos Jobim at their home in Tijuca on Rua Conde de Bonfim.

When Antônio was still an infant, his parents separated and his mother moved with her children (Antônio Carlos and his sister Helena Isaura, born 23 February 1931) to Ipanema, the beachside neighborhood the composer would later celebrate in his songs. In 1935, when the elder Jobim died, Nilza married Celso da Frota Pessoa (died 2 February 1979), who would encourage his stepson's career; he gave Jobim his first piano. Jobim credits his stepfather with encouraging him to pursue music. In an interview with Roberto d'Ávila in 1981, he said, "I hated the piano, I thought it was a girly thing, I liked to play soccer...I had a great stepfather who really helped me get involved with music and convinced me that the piano was not a girly thing." As a young man of limited means, Jobim earned his living by playing in nightclubs and bars and later as an arranger for a recording label before starting to achieve success as a composer.

Later on in the interview with Roberto d'Ávila, Jobim talks about his feelings toward his upbringing. He notes a conversation he had with Erico Verissimo, a friend of his father, in which Verissimo said that Tom Jobim should be sombre due to the absence of his father from a young age. Jobim told d'Ávila: "I was left without a father, clinging to my mother's skirts…some [men] have 'excessive' fathers, the excessive presence of their fathers is a problem, but the absence of a father is also a problem." Jobim continued with d'Ávila, sharing that it takes something of great influence to bring someone to dedicate their life to music. He said that "people who play the piano well are all handicapped". He mentions the health struggles of both Sérgio Mendes, who had osteomyelitis, and Luiz Eça, who had polio. "It takes something really strong to make you leave reality behind and begin to write songs," Jobim shared. With d'Ávila he alludes to his sadness as a young man as being the driving force that motivated him to further his pursuit in music, that he needed to be sad in order to play the piano and write. He concludes on the topic with d'Ávila that, at that point in his life (the interview having taken place in 1981) that he no longer needed to be sad to create music, that he was no longer sad as he was at the beginning of his career.

=== Musical influences ===
Jobim's musical roots were planted firmly in the work of Pixinguinha, the legendary musician and composer who began modern Brazilian music in the 1930s. Among his teachers were Lúcia Branco and, from 1941 on, Hans-Joachim Koellreutter, a German composer who lived in Brazil and introduced atonal and twelve-tone composition in the country. Jobim's mother established a school where Jobim would begin taking lessons on the piano; this is when he would meet Koellreutter. Jobim was also influenced by the French composers Claude Debussy and Maurice Ravel, and by the Brazilian composers Ary Barroso who has been described as Jobim's "most important musical influence". Among many themes, his lyrics talked about love, self-discovery, betrayal, joy and especially about the birds and natural wonders of Brazil, like the "Mata Atlântica" forest, characters of Brazilian folklore and his home city of Rio de Janeiro. In a segment with the NBC Today show in 1986, hosted by Jane Pauley, Jobim spoke about his music's origins of inspiration, saying "My music comes from this environment here, you know, the rain, the sun, the trees, the birds, the fish."

== Career ==
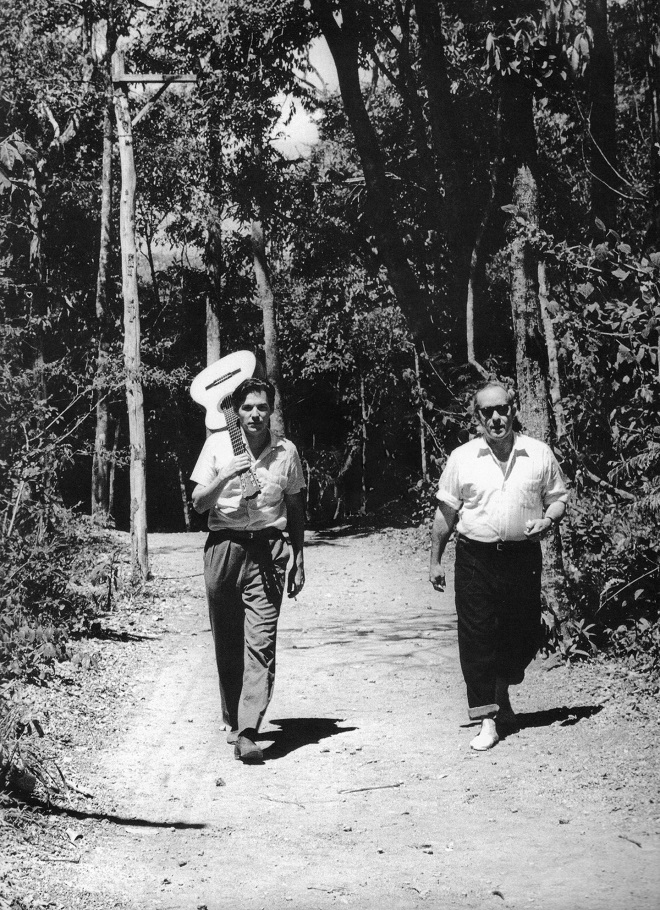
Jobim (left) and de Moraes (right) in 1962. The two wrote many successful songs together, including the music for Orfeu da Conceição and The Girl from Ipanema.

In the 1940s Jobim started to play piano in bars and nightclubs of Rio de Janeiro, and in the first years of the 1950s he worked as an arranger in the Continental Studio, where in April 1953 he had his first composition recorded, when the Brazilian singer Mauricy Moura recorded Jobim's composition "Incerteza", with lyrics by Newton Mendonça.

Jobim became prominent in Brazil when he teamed up with poet and diplomat Vinicius de Moraes to write the music for the play Orfeu da Conceição (1956). The most popular song from the show was "Se Todos Fossem Iguais A Você" ("If Everyone Were Like You"). Later, when the play was adapted into a film, producer Sacha Gordine did not want to use any of the existing music from the play. Gordine asked de Moraes and Jobim for a new score for the film Orfeu Negro, or Black Orpheus (1959). Moraes was at the time away in Montevideo, Uruguay, working for the Itamaraty (the Brazilian Ministry of Foreign Affairs) and so he and Jobim were only able to write three songs, primarily over the telephone ("A felicidade", "Frevo" and "O nosso amor"). This collaboration proved successful, and de Moraes went on to pen the lyrics to some of Jobim's most popular songs.

In 1958 the Brazilian singer and guitarist João Gilberto recorded his first album with two of Jobim's most famous songs, "Desafinado" and "Chega de Saudade". This album inaugurated the Bossa Nova movement in Brazil. The sophisticated harmonies of his songs caught the attention of jazz musicians in the United States, principally after his first performance at Carnegie Hall, in 1962.

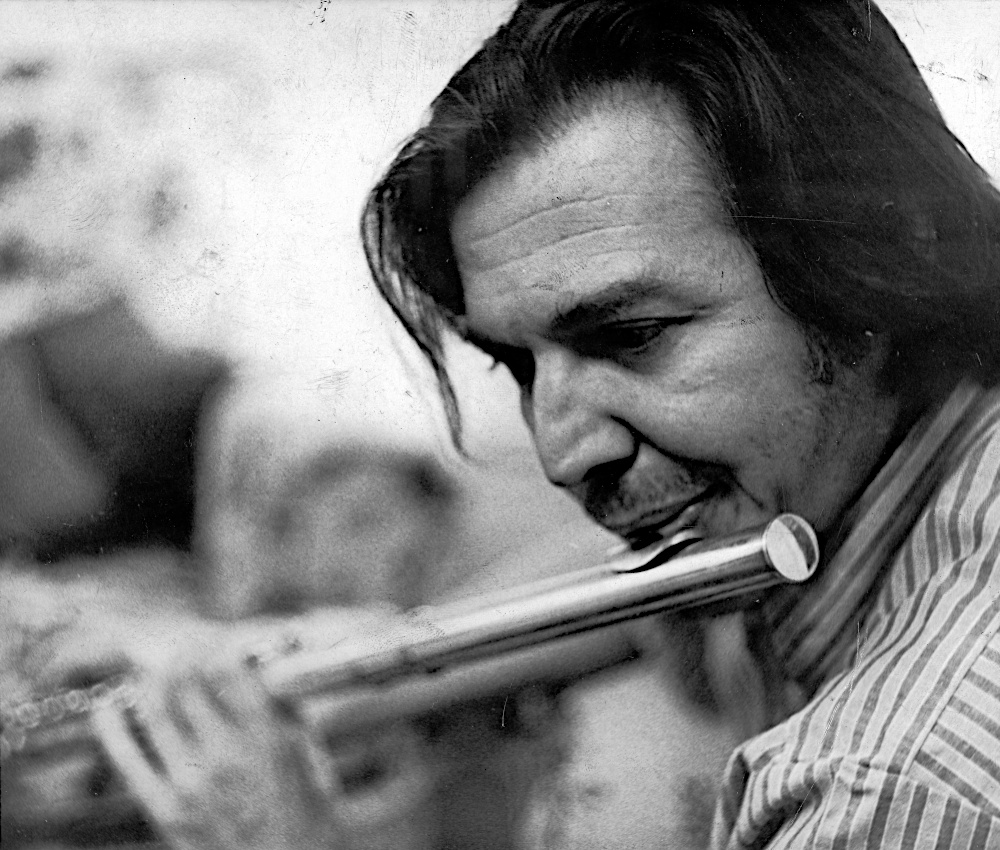
Jobim in 1972

A key event in making Jobim's music known in the English-speaking world was his collaboration with the American jazz saxophonist Stan Getz, the Brazilian singer João Gilberto, and Gilberto's wife at the time, Astrud Gilberto, which resulted in two albums, Getz/Gilberto (1964) and Getz/Gilberto Vol. 2 (1966). The release of Getz/Gilberto created a bossa nova craze in the United States and subsequently internationally. Getz had previously recorded Jazz Samba with Charlie Byrd (1962), and Jazz Samba Encore! with Luiz Bonfá (1964). Jobim wrote many of the songs on Getz/Gilberto, which became one of the best-selling jazz albums of all time, and turned Astrud Gilberto, who sang on "Garota de Ipanema" ("The Girl from Ipanema") and "Corcovado" ("Quiet Nights of Quiet Stars"), into an international sensation. At the Grammy Awards of 1965 Getz/Gilberto won the Grammy Award for Album of the Year, the Grammy Award for Best Jazz Instrumental Album, Individual or Group and the Grammy Award for Best Engineered Album, Non-Classical. "The Girl from Ipanema" won the Grammy Award for Record of the Year. Among his later hits is "Águas de Março" ("Waters of March", 1972), for which he wrote both the Portuguese and English lyrics, and which was then translated into French by Georges Moustaki (as "Les Eaux de Mars", 1973).

In talking about his creative process when writing and creating "Girl From Ipanema", Jobim told Roberto d’Ávila in 1981, "It comes to me in a way, then it changes one or two times and all of the sudden, it becomes something that makes sense…it's like the profile of a woman…the profile of a woman, something very discernible, then you say: ‘hey, this is really beautiful…’ then you stare and as soon as you stare, it's gone, I mean it becomes part of the past." Jobim continues, "I mean, every time you draw something it turns into, it's something static… that portrait remains forever."

=== Collaboration with Elis Regina c. 1974–1982 ===
Jobim and Elis Regina first met in 1974 in Los Angeles, when Regina was only 29 years old and still a fresh face in the Brazilian music industry. Regina was a force to be reckoned with, being referred to as furacão ("hurricane" in English) by those who worked with and around her. The two artists came together to create the album Elis & Tom which would unexpectedly become tremendously popular in the United States as well as across the globe. Regina and Jobim had a special creative chemistry between them that was noted by those who were present to witness the collaborative process first hand during that era in both of their careers. Oscar Castro-Neves, a guitarist-producer who worked with Regina and Jobim on the Elis & Tom album in the mid-1970s, recalled in an article with the Los Angeles Times that "There was a very fine line between ‘rehearsal’ and ‘hanging out,’ ‘just talking’...it was all that seamless." Due to the nature of their work relationship, Regina and Jobim grew close and had a symbiosis that is reflected in the result of their work together. "Aguas de março" represents this, with the lyrics simulating a banter of finishing each other's sentences.

== Personal life ==
Jobim was married to Thereza Otero Hermanny on 15 October 1949 and had two children with her: Paulo Jobim (1950–2022), an architect and musician and father of Daniel Jobim (born 1973) and Dora Jobim (born 1976); and Elizabeth "Beth" Jobim (born 1957), a painter. Jobim and Thereza divorced in 1978. On 30 April 1986, he married 29-year-old photographer Ana Beatriz Lontra, with whom he had two more children: João Francisco Jobim (1979–1998) and Maria Luiza Helena Jobim (born 1987). Daniel, Paulo's son, followed his grandfather to become a pianist and composer, and performed "The Girl from Ipanema" during the opening ceremony of the 2016 Summer Olympics in Rio de Janeiro.

== Death ==
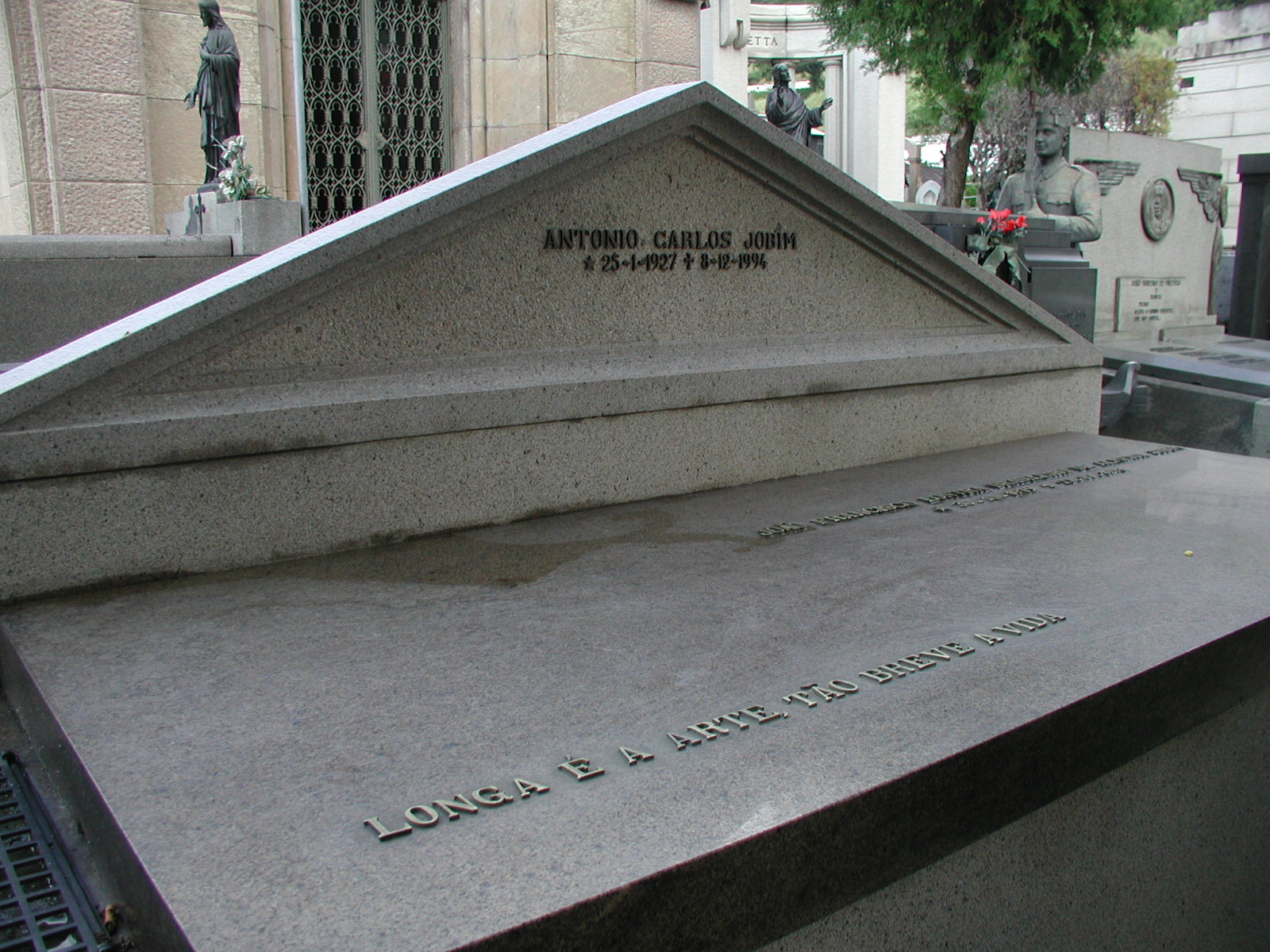
Grave of Jobim in the Saint John the Baptist Cemetery, Rio de Janeiro

In early 1994, after finishing his album Antonio Brasileiro, Jobim complained to his doctor, Roberto Hugo Costa Lima, of urinary problems. Jobim was diagnosed with bladder cancer and underwent treatment, although he postponed surgery. He underwent an operation at Mount Sinai Hospital in New York City on 2 December 1994. At 7:00 EST on 8 December, while recovering from surgery, he had a cardiac arrest caused by a pulmonary embolism, and two hours later, another cardiac arrest, from which he died. He was surrounded by his children and grandchildren. His last album, Antonio Brasileiro, was released posthumously, just days after his death.

His body lay in state until given a proper burial on 20 December 1994. He is buried in the Cemitério São João Batista in Rio de Janeiro.

== Legacy ==
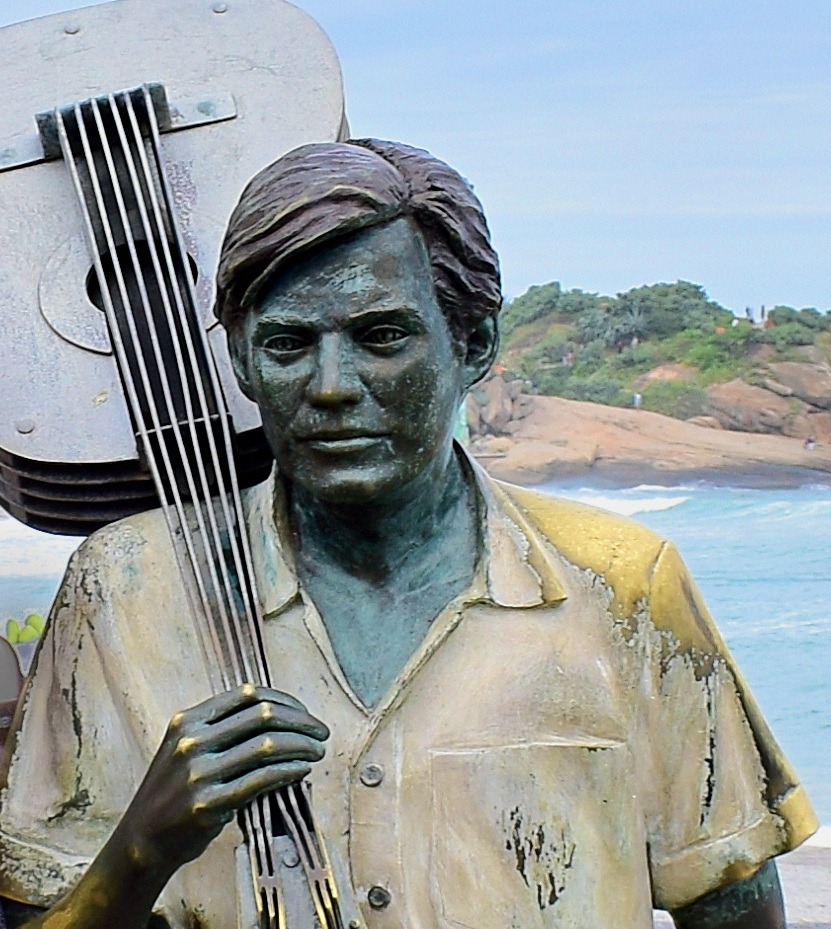
Statue of Jobim in Ipanema

Jobim is widely regarded as one of the most important songwriters of the 20th century. Many of his songs are jazz standards. American jazz singers Ella Fitzgerald and Frank Sinatra prominently featured Jobim's songs on their albums Ella Abraça Jobim (1981) and Francis Albert Sinatra & Antônio Carlos Jobim (1967), respectively. The 1996 CD Wave: The Antonio Carlos Jobim Songbook included performances of Jobim tunes by Oscar Peterson, Herbie Hancock, Chick Corea and Toots Thielemans.

Jobim was an innovator in the use of sophisticated harmonic structures in popular song. Some of his melodic twists included the melody insisting on the major seventh of the chord.

The Brazilian collaborators and interpreters of Jobim's music include Vinicius de Moraes, João Gilberto (often credited as a co-creator or creator of bossa nova), Chico Buarque, Edu Lobo, Gal Costa, Elis Regina, Sérgio Mendes, Astrud Gilberto and Flora Purim. Buarque said in 1999 he has a drawer full of tapes gifted to him by Jobim. Significant arrangements of Jobim's compositions were written by Eumir Deodato, Nelson Riddle, and especially the conductor/composer Claus Ogerman.

He won a Lifetime Achievement Award at the 54th Grammy Awards in 2012. As a posthumous homage, on 5 January 1999, the Municipality of Rio de Janeiro changed the name of Rio's Galeão International Airport, located on Governador Island, to bear the composer's name. Galeão Airport is explicitly mentioned in his composition "Samba do Avião". In 2014, Jobim was posthumously inducted to the Latin Songwriters Hall of Fame. In 2015, Billboard named Jobim as one of The 30 Most Influential Latin Artists of All Time. He was nominated for five Grammy Awards, including Best New Artist at the 7th Grammy Awards, where he lost to the Beatles. He won Best Latin Jazz Performance for the album titled Antonio Brasileiro at the 38th Annual Grammy Awards.

Written by Elliott Smith, the ninth track on Oregon alternative rock band Heatmiser's 1994 album Cop and Speeder is entitled "Antonio Carlos Jobim".

American contemporary jazz singer Michael Franks dedicated his 1995 album Abandoned Garden to the memory of Jobim. English singer/songwriter George Michael frequently acknowledged Jobim's influence. His 1996 album Older was dedicated to Jobim, and he recorded "Desafinado" on Red Hot + Rio (1996) with Astrud Gilberto.

Following a public vote, the official mascot of the 2016 Summer Paralympics in Rio de Janeiro, Tom, was named after him.

In 2015, a crater on the planet Mercury was named in his honor by the IAU.

== Discography and compositions ==
Studio albums

- 1963: The Composer of Desafinado, Plays (Verve)
- 1965: The Wonderful World of Antônio Carlos Jobim (Warner Bros.)
- 1967: A Certain Mr. Jobim (Warner Bros.)
- 1967: Wave (CTI/A&M)
- 1970: Stone Flower (CTI)
- 1970: Tide (A&M)
- 1973: Jobim (MCA)
- 1976: Urubu (Warner Bros.)
- 1980: Terra Brasilis (Warner Bros.)
- 1987: Passarim (Verve)
- 1995: Antônio Brasileiro (Columbia)
- 1995: Inédito (Ariola)
- 1997: Minha Alma Canta (Lumiar)

Collaborations

- 1954: Sinfonia do Rio de Janeiro (Continental), with Billy Blanco
- 1956: Orfeu da Conceição (Odeon), with Vinicius de Moraes
- 1957: "O Pequeno Príncipe" (Festa), an audiobook, whose soundtrack Jobim composed
- 1961: Brasília – Sinfonia Da Alvorada (Columbia), with Vinicius de Moraes
- 1964: Getz/Gilberto (Verve)
- 1964: Caymmi visita Tom (Elenco/Polygram/Philips), with Dorival Caymmi
- 1967: Francis Albert Sinatra & Antônio Carlos Jobim (Reprise)
- 1974: Elis & Tom (Philips), with Elis Regina
- 1977: Miúcha & Antônio Carlos Jobim (RCA), with Miúcha
- 1979: Miúcha & Tom Jobim (RCA), with Miúcha
- 1981: Edu & Tom (Philips), with Edu Lobo
- 1983: Gabriela (RCA), original soundtrack from the movie "Gabriela, Cravo e Canela"

== Sources ==
- Cabral, Sergio (2008). Antônio Carlos Jobim – Uma Biografia (1st ed.). São Paulo, Brazil: IBEP Nacional. ISBN 978-85-7865-011-7.
- Castro, Ruy (2000). Bossa Nova: The Story of the Brazilian Music That Seduced the World (1st English-Language ed.). Chicago: A Capella Books. ISBN 978-1-55652-409-7.
- De Stefano, Gildo, Il popolo del samba, La vicenda e i protagonisti della storia della musica popolare brasiliana, preface by Chico Buarque de Hollanda, introduction by Gianni Minà, RAI-ERI, Rome 2005, ISBN 8839713484
- De Stefano, Gildo, Saudade Bossa Nova: musiche, contaminazioni e ritmi del Brasile, preface by Chico Buarque, introduction by Gianni Minà, Logisma Editore, Florence 2017, ISBN 978-88-97530-88-6
- Jobim, Helena (2011). Antonio Carlos Jobim: an illuminated man. Montclair, NJ: Hal Leonard. ISBN 978-1-61780-343-7. OCLC 709673747.
- McGowan, Chris; Pessanha, Ricardo (2008). The Brazilian Sound: Samba, Bossa Nova and the Popular Music of Brazil (2nd ed.). Philadelphia, PA: Temple University Press. ISBN 978-1592139293.
