= Sambrasa Trio =

Brazilian jazz-samba group

- Origin: São Paulo, Brazil
- Genres: Samba, Bossa nova, Jazz
- Years active: 1965
- Labels: Som Maior
- Members: Hermeto Pascoal; Humberto Clayber; Airto Moreira

Sambrasa Trio is a Brazilian samba and jazz group, formed by Hermeto Pascoal (piano and flute), Humberto Clayber (bass and harmonica) and Airto Moreira (drums). The band started to play in 1965, but it did not last long. However, its music and Brazilian popular songs influenced many instrumental samba and jazz musicians for years.

The band recorded only one album in 1965, named Em Som Maior. This album was praised by critics and helped its musicians to continue their careers. After the demise of the group, none of its three members played together again. However, in pairs, they composed for other bands, after and before Sambrasa Trio, such as Sambalanço Trio, with Clayber and Airto, and Quarteto Novo, with Hermeto and Airto. Currently, all three members follow a solo career.
