= Sambalanço Trio (album) =

Studio album by Sambalanço Trio
- Released: 1964
- Genre: Samba, Jazz
- Length: 33:16
- Label: Audio Fidelity, Ubatuqui
- Producer: Jordi Pujol

Sambalanço Trio chronology
Sambalanço Trio (1964)	Improviso Negro (1965)

Sambalanço Trio is the debut album by Brazilian samba-jazz group Sambalanço Trio, released in 1964. The album was reissued later that year as Samblues.

== Reception ==
Professional ratings
Review scores
Source	Rating
Allmusic	4/5 stars

Writing for Allmusic, critic John Vallier writes that the group "had a sophisticated and multi-faceted sound, one that melded an aggressive, samba-school-on-parade sound with a subtler air, redolent of Antonio Carlos Jobim, João Gilberto, and even the Bill Evans Trio". The album, he writes, "infused the soporific bossa nova scene of 1964 with much-needed doses of energetic rhythms, cutting-edge jazz voicings, and spontaneity".

== Track listing ==
1. "Samblues" (César Camargo Mariano) – 2:13
2. "Balanço Zona Sul" (Tito Madi) – 2:31
3. "O Morro Não Tem Vez" (Antônio Carlos Jobim, Vinícius de Moraes) – 3:42
4. "Nós E O Mar" (Ronaldo Bôscoli, Roberto Menescal) – 2:15
5. "Homenagem a Clifford Brown" – 2:39
6. "Berimbau" (Vinícius de Moraes, Baden Powell) – 3:50
7. "Jacqueline K" – 2:45
8. "Consolação" (Vinícius de Moraes, Baden Powell) – 2:35
9. "O Amor Que Acabou" (Chico Feitosa, Lula Freire) – 3:10
10. "P'ra Que Chorar" (Vinícius de Moraes, Baden Powell) – 2:26
11. "Marisa" (César Camargo Mariano) – 3:00
12. "Sambinha" – 2:10

== Personnel ==
- Cesar Camargo Mariano – piano
- Humberto Clayber – bass
- Airto Moreira – drums
