= Heraldo do Monte =

Brazilian guitarist

Heraldo do Monte (born 1 May 1935 in Recife, Pernambuco, Brasil) is a Brazilian guitarist. He has played on albums by Gilberto Gil and Hermeto Pascoal.

In 1966, Quarteto Novo (with Airto Moreira, Hermeto Pascoal, Theo de Barros), released one album and launched the careers of its members.

== Discography ==
=== Solo ===
- 1960: Heraldo e seu Conjunto
- 1961: Dançando com o Sucesso
- 1962: Dançando com o Sucesso 02
- 1970: O violão de Heraldo do Monte
- 1976: Batida Diferente
- 1980: Heraldo do Monte
- 1982: ConSertão (com Elomar, Arthur Moreira Lima e Paulo Moura)
- 1983: Cordas Vivas (part. especial: Hermeto Pascoal)
- 1986: Cordas Mágicas
- 2001: Viola Nordestina
- 2004: Guitarra Brasileira
- 2004: MPBaby - Moda de Viola
- 2007: Heraldo do Monte
- 2016: Heraldo do Monte

=== With Hareton Salvanini ===
- 1974: A Virgem de Saint Tropez
