= Hector Costita =

- Also known as: Don Junior
- Born: Hector Bisignani; October 27, 1934 (age 91); Buenos Aires, Argentina
- Genres: Bossa nova, samba, jazz
- Occupations: Musician, composer
- Instruments: Saxophone, flute, clarinet
- Years active: ?–present

Hector Costita (born October 27, 1934) is a musician and composer. He was born in Buenos Aires, Argentina. However, he is one of the most famous flutist and saxophonist in Brazilian music. He performed and recorded with Lalo Schifrin, Manfredo Fest, Sérgio Mendes, Zimbo Trio, Hermeto Pascoal, and Elis Regina.

== Biography ==
Hector "Costita" Bisignani was born in 1934, in Buenos Aires, Argentina. He is an Italian descendant and started studying music when he was 13 years old. The first instrument he learnt to play was clarinet.

When he was 18, he started playing saxophone, influenced by Lalo Schifrin. In 1954, Schifrin invited Bisignani to compose his band. This is considered the beginning of Costita's career.

In the second half of the 1950s, Bisignani went to Brazil where he joined Simonetti's orchestra. He never came back to his country. In fact, Costita continued his career in Brazil and contributed to the development and divulgation of the Brazilian music.

The 1960s probably was the best decade for Hector Costita. During those years, he played with many famous musicians and recorded his main albums. At the beginning of the decade, he formed a samba trio with João Donato and Xu Vianna. In 1962, he recorded his first album: O fabuloso Hector. In that decade, he used to presents himself as Don Junior. Despite his solo career, Bisignani played in Sexteto Bossa Rio, with Sérgio Mendes, from 1962 to 1964. He also played with Dick Farney (1962), Manfredo Fest (1963) and Luiz Chaves (1963). In 1964, he recorded the album which is considered the main of his career: Impacto.

In 1964, Bisignani moved to France to study in Music Conservatory of Paris. Back to Brazil, he joined Carlos Piper's orchestra, but he also played as sideman for many artist such as Elis Regina and Wilson Simonal.

From 1973 to 1981, Costita joined the Nelson Aires big band. After the end of that group, he started his career as teacher of music. He started teaching in CLAM, a Brazilian popular music school, created by Zimbo Trio.

== Discography ==
=== As leader ===
- 1962: O fabuloso Hector
- 1962: Sambas, as Don Junior
- 1964: Impacto
- 1981: Hector Costita
- 1985: Paracachúm
- 2004: A noite è minha
- 2007: Estamos todos hai
- 2024: Batida Diferente! Samba Jazz - produced by Studio 8 Records

=== As sideman ===
- 1963: Bossa nova, nova bossa, by Manfredo Fest
- 1976: Zimbo, by Zimbo Trio
- 2013: Pioneiros do Jazz Paulistano
