= Improviso Negro =

Studio album by Sambalanço Trio
- Released: 1965
- Genre: Samba, Jazz
- Length: 33:38
- Label: Ubatuqui

Sambalanço Trio chronology
Sambalanço Trio (1964)	Improviso Negro (1965)	Reencontro com Sambalanço Trio (1965)

Improviso Negro is an album by Brazilian samba-jazz group Sambalanço Trio released in 1965.

== Reception ==
Professional ratings
Review scores
Source	Rating
Allmusic	3.5/5 stars

Writing for Allmusic, John Bush states that the album "showed them expanding their dynamic range over their early LPs, ranging from tender balladry to clattering bossa nova workouts."

== Track listing ==
1. "Nana" (Mario Telles) – 2:41
2. "Reza" (Edú Lobo) – 5:05
3. "Estamos Aí" (Durval Ferreira) – 2:29
4. "Deus Brasileiro" (Marcos Valle) – 1:13
5. "Preciso Aprender a Ser Só" (Marcos Valle) – 3:26
6. "Cangaceiro" (Antonio Arruda) – 2:35
7. "Improviso Negro" (Humberto Clayber) – 2:43
8. "Roda de Samba" (Lúcio Alves) – 2:27
9. "Voce" (Ronaldo Bôscoli, Roberto Menescal) – 3:31
10. "Cançao Que Veio de Dentro Do Azul" – 4:44
11. "Samba de Verao" (Marcos Valle) – 2:44

== Personnel ==
- Cesar Camargo Mariano – piano
- Humberto Clayber – bass
- Airto Moreira – drums
