= Reencontro com Sambalanço Trio =

Studio album by Sambalanço Trio
- Released: 1965
- Genre: Samba, jazz
- Length: 29:38
- Label: Som Maior
- Producer: Laércio Vieira

Sambalanço Trio chronology
Improviso Negro (1965)	Reencontro com Sambalanço Trio (1965)

Reencontro com Sambalanço Trio is the fourth album recorded by Sambalanço Trio. It was released on an LP in 1965 and presents a fusion of samba and jazz.

In 2006 this album was reissued on CD as part of the Som Livre Masters series organized by Charles Gavin.

== Track listing ==
#	Title	Songwriters	Length
1.	"Samba pro Pedrinho"	Walter Santos, Tereza Souza	2:22
2.	"Deixa"	Baden Powell, Vinicius de Moraes	2:24
3.	"Lenda"	Marcos Valle	2:54
4.	"Tensão"	Humberto Clayber	1:51
5.	"Razão de viver"	Eumir Deodato	2:38
6.	"Pra machucar meu coração"	Ary Barroso	3:04
7.	Pout-Pourri		3:57
	"Samblues"	Cesar Camargo Mariano	
	"Sambinha"	Cesar Camargo Mariano, Humberto Clayber	
	"O amor que acabou"	Chico Feitosa, Lula Freire	
	"Nanã"	Mário Telles, Moacir Santos	
	"Pra que chorar?"	Baden Powell, Vinicius de Moraes	
	"O morro não tem vez"	Tom Jobim, Vinicius de Moraes	
	"Roda de samba"	Lúcio Alves	
	"Samblues"	Cesar Camargo Mariano	
8.	"Deixa Pra Là"	Sergio Augusto, Lula Freire	2:02
9.	"Só... pela noite"	Airto Moreira	3:54
10.	"Step right up"	Oliver Nelson	1:32
11.	"Manhã de nós dois"	Cesar Camargo Mariano, Mariza	2:55

The seventh track, "Pout-pourri", is composed by pieces of other seven songs listed below the track.

== Personnel ==
- Cesar Camargo Mariano - piano
- Humberto Clayber - bass
- Airto Moreira - drums
