= Humberto Clayber =

Brazilian composer and musician

- Also known as: Clayber de Souza
- Born: Humberto Clayber de Souza; 1937 (age 88–89); São Paulo, São Paulo, Brazil
- Genres: Bossa nova, samba, jazz
- Occupations: musician, composer
- Instruments: Double bass, harmonica
- Years active: 1945–present
- Website: clayberdesouza.com.br

Humberto Clayber de Souza is a Brazilian composer and musician. He was considered one of the best Bossa Nova bass players in 1960s and actually is acclaimed as one of the best harmonica players of the world. He played with many famous artists along his career, such as Cesar Camargo Mariano, Airto Moreira, Hermeto Pascoal and Manfredo Fest.

== Biography ==
Humberto Clayber, or Clayber de Souza, started his musical career when he was 8 years old. At that period, he played for Radio Cultura band and, as a member of this group, he made his first shows. In 1956, he played for Hering Harmonicas. With Zezinho Lima and Raymundo Paiva, he played in São Paulo and other near cities, as endorser. He is responsible for popularizing the harmonica around Brazil, specially São Paulo.

In the 1960s, he joined some samba-jazz groups. First, in 1963, he played with Manfredo Fest trio, as bassist, and recorded the debut album by the blind pianist: Bossa nova, nova bossa. One year later, he joined Sambalanço Trio, with Cesar Camargo Mariano and Airto Moreira. With this group, he recorded five albums. However, in 1965, Sambalanço Trio disbanded. So, with Moreira and Hermeto Pascoal, he formed Sambrasa Trio. These groups were considered some of the most important of that period; therefore, as member of them, Clayber was considered one of the best bassists of that years.

He also played in Sambossa 5, in the end of the 1960s, and in Jongo Trio (with Paulo Roberto and Toninho), in the beginning of the 1970s.

In the 1970s, Clayber stopped playing bass and decided to play only harmonica. Then, years later, he was considered one of the best harmonicists of the world, receiving a diploma by Fábrica de Gaitas Hohner, in 1979. In fact, Clayber can play about 40 different kinds of harmonica and can play six simultaneously.

Actually, Clayber teaches how to play harmonicas, according to his own method. He still composes many songs in several rhythms: bossa nova, jazz, blues, tango, valsa.

== Discography ==
=== As sideman ===
- 1963: Bossa nova, nova bossa, by Manfredo Fest
- 1966: Octeto de Cesar Camargo Mariano, by Cesar Camargo Mariano

=== With Sambalanço Trio ===
- 1964: Sambalanço Trio (Audio Fidelity)
- 1964: Samblues (Som Maior)
- 1965: À vontade mesmo (RCA), with Raul de Souza
- 1965: Reencontro com Sambalanço Trio (Som Maior)
- 1965: Lennie Dale & Sambalanço Trio no Zum Zum (Elenco), with Lennie Dale

=== With Sambrasa Trio ===
- 1965: Em Som Maior, with Sambrasa Trio

=== As leader ===
- 1980: Sob medida
- 1997: Nos caminhos da bossa, also known as Uma gaita na bossa
- 1998: A harmônica brasileira na música de Chico Buarque
