= Favela (disambiguation) =

A favela is a Brazilian slum neighborhood.

Favela may also refer to:

- Cnidoscolus quercifolius, a tree native to Brazil
- Armando Favela (b. 1986), Mexican golfer
- Cristian Favela (b. 1979), Mexican boxer
- Marlene Favela (b. 1977), Mexican actress
- "Favela", an instrumental composition by Antonio Carlos Jobim from The Wonderful World of Antonio Carlos Jobim
- "Favela", a 2018 song by Ina Wroldsen and Alok
- "Favela", a 2024 song by Chase Atlantic from Lost in Heaven

== See also ==
- Favila, 8th-century ruler of Asturias
