= Em Som Maior =

Studio album by Sambrasa Trio
- Released: 1965
- Genre: Samba, Jazz
- Length: 33:29
- Label: Som Maior(LP)/Som Livre(CD)

Em som maior is the only album recorded by Sambrasa Trio, a Brazilian group formed by Hermeto Pascoal, Humberto Clayber and Airto Moreira. It was released on an LP in 1965 and presents a fusion of various musical rhythms, including samba and jazz. In 2006, after long period of neglect, this album was reissued on CD as one of works included in Som Livre Masters series, organized by Charles Gavin.

== Track listing ==
#	Title	Songwriters	Length
1.	"Sambrasa"	Airto Moreira	3:42
2.	"Aleluia"	Ruy Guerra, Edu Lobo	3:13
3.	"Samba novo"	Durval Ferreira	2:44
4.	"Clerenice"	José Neto	2:15
5.	"Duas contas"	Garoto	2:40
6.	"Nem o mar sabia"	Roberto Menescal, Ronaldo Bôscoli	2:26
7.	"Arrastão"	Edu Lobo, Vinicius de Moraes	4:23
8.	"Coalhada"	Hermeto Pascoal	3:04
9.	"João sem braço"	Humberto Clayber	3:44
10.	"Lamento nortista"	Humberto Clayber	3:17
11.	"A jardineira"	Humberto Porto, Benedito Lacerda	1:56

== Personnel ==
- Hermeto Pascoal – piano, flute
- Humberto Clayber – bass, harmonica
- Airto Moreira – drums
