= Théo de Barros =

Brazilian songwriter (1943–2023)

- Birth name: Teófilo Augusto de Barros Neto
- Born: 10 March 1943; Rio de Janeiro, RJ, Brazil
- Origin: São Paulo, Brazil
- Died: 15 March 2023 (aged 80); Santos, São Paulo, Brazil
- Genres: MPB, jazz
- Occupation(s): musician, songwriter, music director, arranger, jingle writer
- Instrument: Viola
- Years active: 1962–2004
- Labels: EMI, Odeon, Philips, Eldorado
- Formerly of: Quarteto Novo, Sabá Quarteto
- Website: Theo de Barros Site Oficial

Teófilo Augusto de Barros Neto, better known as Théo de Barros (10 March 1943 – 15 March 2023), was a Brazilian composer. From the 1960s he released and participated on albums with other Brazilian artists.

De Barros was known for his collaborations with Geraldo Vandré, for example on Disparada (tied with A banda by Chico Buarque for 1st place in the 2nd Festival de Música popular brasileira (MPB) 1966, produced and broadcast by TV Record), and for the song Menino das laranjas, recorded by Elis Regina that same year.

In 1966 the band Quarteto Novo was formed (with De Barros, Airto Moreira, Heraldo do Monte and later Hermeto Pascoal), and in 1967 released one album which launched the careers of its members and had wide influence.

De Barros also collaborated with Inezita Barroso on her album Afinal.

De Barros died on 15 March 2023, at the age of 80.
