= Jovino Santos Neto =

Brazilian-American jazz musician, composer, and educator

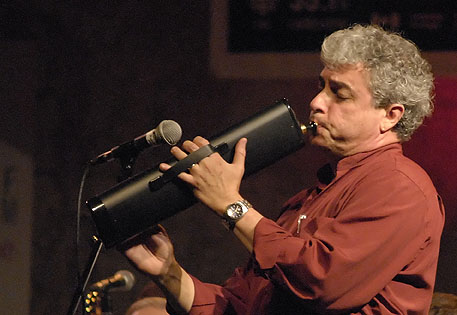

Background information
- Born: September 18, 1954 (age 72); Rio de Janeiro, Brazil
- Genres: Jazz; contemporary classical
- Occupations: Musician; composer; educator
- Instruments: Piano; flute
- Years active: 1977–present
- Website: www.jovisan.net

Jovino Santos Neto (born September 18, 1954) is a Seattle-based Brazilian-American jazz pianist, flutist, composer, arranger, educator and record producer.

== Career ==
Jovino Santos Neto started playing piano at age 13 and by 16 was playing keyboards in a band called the Vacancy Group in Bangu, Rio de Janeiro. He earned a degree in Biology from the Federal University of Rio de Janeiro, and later attended Macdonald College of McGill University in Montreal, Quebec, Canada.

In 1977, he joined the group led by Brazilian composer Hermeto Pascoal, working as a pianist, flutist, composer, arranger and producer. Since leaving Hermeto's group in 1992 and relocating to the United States, Santos Neto has released several albums. He has toured internationally as the leader of his own ensemble and with musicians such as Airto Moreira, Flora Purim, and Mike Marshall.

Santos Neto taught at Seattle's Cornish College of the Arts for 26 years, ending in May 2020, whereupon he took to teaching via Zoom. He is a frequent teacher at Jazz Camp West.

== Discography ==
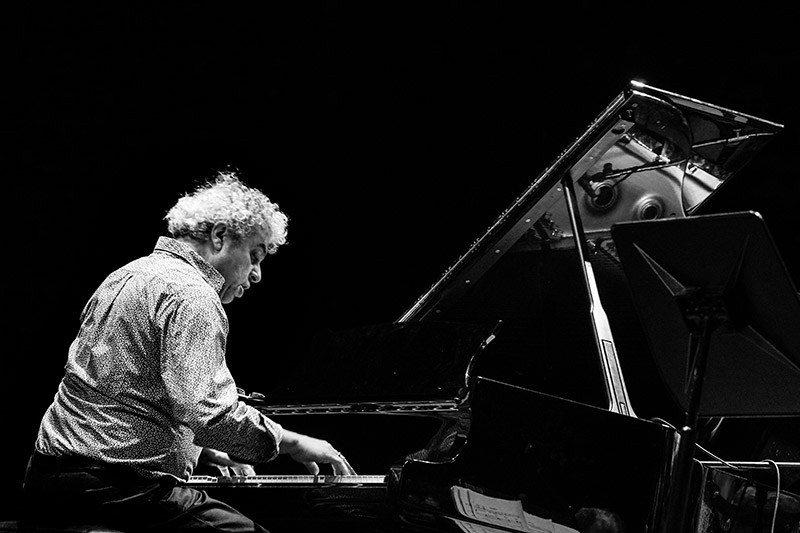
Jovino Santos Neto (2018) in Aarhus, Denmark

- 1998: Caboclo
- 2000: Ao Vivo em Olympia (Live in Olympia, Washington)
- 2001: Balaio (Basket) (Malandro)
- 2003: Canto do Rio
- 2003: Serenata with Mike Marshall
- 2005: Brazil Duets with Mike Marshall
- 2006: Roda Carioca
- 2008: Alma do Nordeste (Soul of the Northeast)
- 2010: Veja o Som
- 2011: Current

== Awards ==
- Artist Trust Fellowship, 2001
- IAJE/ASCAP (International Association for Jazz Education/American Society of Composers, Authors and Publishers Commission) for an established composer, 2002
- Chamber Music America New Works Jazz Composition Award, 2003
- Northwest Jazz Instrumentalist of the Year, Earshot Jazz, 2004
- Nomination, Best Latin Jazz Album, Canto do Rio, Latin Grammy Awards, 2004
- Nomination, Best Latin Jazz Album, Roda Carioca, Latin Grammy Awards, 2006
- Nomination, Best Instrumental Album Live at Caramoor, Latin Grammy Awards, 2009
