= Brazilian Jazz Quartet =

- Origin: São Paulo, São Paulo, Brazil
- Genres: MPB, jazz
- Years active: 1958
- Labels: Columbia Records
- Members: José Ferreira Godinho Filho "Casé"; Moacyr Peixoto; Rubens Alberto Barsotti (Rubinho); Luiz Chaves

The Brazilian Jazz Quartet was an underground Brazilian jazz quartet from the late 1950s featuring Moacyr Peixoto (piano), José Ferreira Godinho Filho "Casé" (alto sax), Rubens Alberto Barsotti "Rubinho" (drums) e Luiz Chaves Oliveira da Paz "Luiz Chaves" (bass).

== History ==
The Brazilian Jazz Quartet was an underground Brazilian jazz quartet from the late 1950s featuring Moacyr Peixoto) (Piano), José Ferreira Godinho Filho "Casé" (Alto Sax), Rubens Alberto Barsotti "Rubinho" (Drums), and Luiz Chaves Oliveira da Paz "Luiz Chaves" (Bass). As a matter of fact, this group should be considered as a sort of embryo of the legendary Zimbo Trio.

The band released one album in 1958, called Coffee and Jazz

== Discography ==
- Coffee and Jazz (Columbia Records, 1958)
