= Malandro (disambiguation) =

A malandro is a person of the Brazilian malandragem stereotype.

Malandro may also refer to:

- Malandro Records, an American record label
- Kristina Wagner (born 1963), an American soap opera actress sometimes known as Kristina Malandro
- Malandro, a 1985 album by Chico Buarque
- Malandro, English title for the 1986 Brazilian musical comedy film Ópera do Malandro (pt)
- Michiko Malandro, a character in the 2012 anime Michiko to Hatchin
