= Lennie Dale =

American-Brazilian actor (1937–1994)

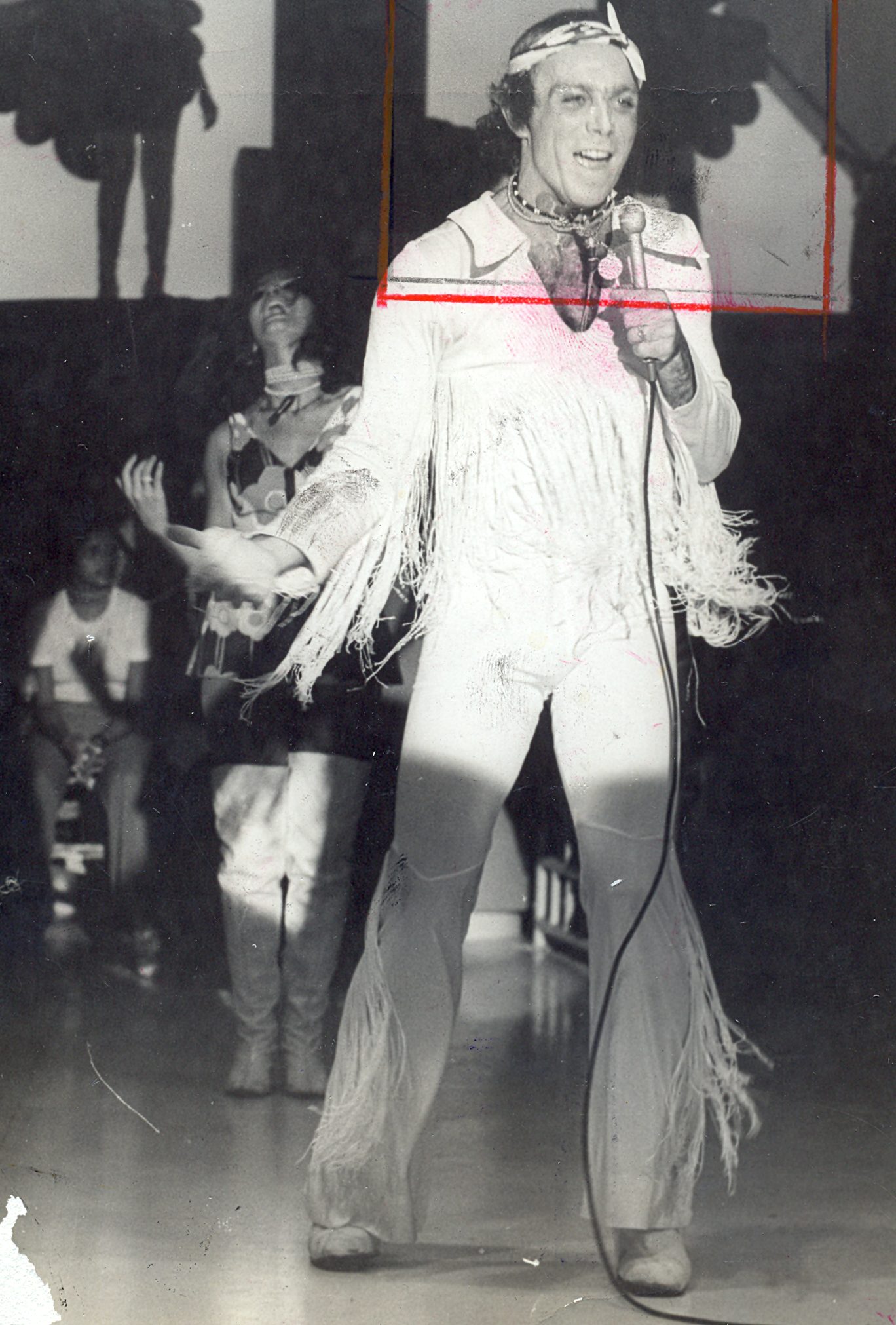
- Lennie Dale in 1972
- Born: Leonardo La Ponzina; July 21, 1937; Brooklyn, New York, U.S.
- Died: August 9, 1994 (aged 57); Manhattan, New York, U.S.
- Occupations: Actor, choreographer, dancer

Leonardo La Ponzina, better known as Lennie Dale (July 21, 1937 – August 9, 1994) was an American-Brazilian choreographer, dancer, actor, and singer of Italian background.

== Biography ==
Dale was born on July 21, 1937 in Brooklyn, New York. He began his professional career as an actor on the children's' program Star Lime Kids alongside Connie Francis.

He gave dances classes from 14 to 21 years old, including while in grade school. He became a part of the cast of West Side Story on Broadway. Afterwards, he moved to London, where he was hired by a business partner of Shirley Bassey, giving performances in Europe and participating, alongside Gene Kelly, on Italian television programs. He was responsible for the choreography of more than 500 dancers on Cleopatra, starring Elizabeth Taylor, who later became his friend.

Dale first went to Brazil in 1960, invited by revue theater director Carlos Machado to create the choreography for a musical. Afterwards, he went on to emigrate and stay in the country for long periods of time.

He became a well-known figure in the 1960s and 1970s for his performances together with the founding artists of the bossa nova movement. He directed various specials shown on Beco das Garrafas, a hotspot for Bohemians and bossa nova music.

In 1973, during the height of the military dictatorship in Brazil, Dale founded the androgynous group Dzi Croquettes, which mixed dance with theater. Due to its irreverent sense of humor, the group became a symbol of the counterculture during that period. The history of the group was made into a documentary of the same name in 2009.

Dale travelled constantly back to the United States, where he directed specials with artists such as Liza Minnelli.

Dale had suffered from AIDS and travelled to the United States in 1988 after he discovered he had the disease to receive free medical assistance, counseled by his own doctor. He died on August 9, 1994 from the disease at Coler Specialty Hospital in New York at 57 years old.

== Discography ==
- Um show de bossa… Lennie Dale com os Bossa Três (1964) Elenco LP
- Lennie Dale e o Sambalanço Trio-Gravado no Zum Zum (1965) Elenco LP
- Berimbau/O pato Lennie Dale e o Sambalanço Trio (1965) Elenco Compacto simples
- Lennie Dale (1965) Elenco LP
- A 3ª Dimensão de Lennie Dale Lennie Dale e Trio 3D (1967) Elenco LP
- O máximo da Bossa Vários artistas (1967) Rare Elenco LP

== Filmography ==
- Dzi Croquettes, by Tatiana Issa and Raphael Alvarez

== Portrayal in media ==
Júlio Andrade portrayed Dale in the 2016 film Elis, which was based on the life of Elis Regina.
