= Malandro Records =

Malandro Records was an American record label based in Cincinnati, Ohio, which released albums by Brazilian musicians. Founded by Rick Warm, the label released about 20 albums before it ceased operation.

The label's name came from the Portuguese word malandragem, a person who lived a certain type of free lifestyle.

All About Jazz called Malandro "the leading U.S. label specializing in contemporary Brazilian music".

== Discography ==
Recordings c. 1996 – 2001

Artist	Album	Other personnel	MAL710
Rick Udler & Maria Alvim	Rhythm & Romance		1
Ulisses Rocha	Moleque		2
Juarez Moreira	Bom Dia		3
Carlos Malta	Jetinho Brasilerio	Guinga	4
Trio da Paz	Partido Out		5
UZ22	Renascimento: The Music of Milton Nascimento		6
Agua De Moringa	Saracoteando (Strolling)		7
Terra Brasil	Mestico		8
Cafe Jam	Moio		9
Ze Luis	Guarani Banana		10
Filó Machado	Cantando um Samba (Singing Samba)		11
Ladston do Nascimento	A Voz do Caracao		12
Tutty Moreno	Forcas D'Alma - Forces of the Soul		13
Rabo de Lagartixa	Quebra-Queixo (Jawbreaker)	Elza Soares	14
Natta & Merukens	Encontros	Helio Alves	15
Ulisses Rocha & Teco Cardoso	Caminhos Cruzados		16
Boukas & Jovino Santos Neto	Balaio		17
Duduka Da Fonseca	Samba Jazz Fantasia		18
Trio da Paz	Café	Dianne Reeves, Joe Lovano, Cesar Camargo Mariano	19
Various artists	Bossa, Samba and Beyond		
Various artists	Samba Jazz Sunday		
Paulinho Nogueira	Reflexões (Reflection)		
