= Uma gaita na bossa =

Studio album by Clayber de Souza
- Released: 1997
- Genre: bossa nova, jazz
- Length: 42:09
- Label: Allegretto
- Producer: Alexandre Nunes

Uma gaita na bossa, also known as Nos caminhos da bossa, is a 1997 album by the Brazilian harmonica player Clayber de Souza. It is collection of the main hits of Bossa nova, Jazz and Blues, such as "Samba de uma nota só" and "Garota de Ipanema". However, all its songs were arranged as a fusion of Samba and Jazz, remembering the period Souza played as bass guitarist, in 1960s.

== Track listing ==
#	Title	Songwriters	Length
1.	"Garota de Ipanema"	Tom Jobim, Vinicius de Moraes	5:03
2.	"Samba de uma nota só"	Tom Jobim, Newton Mendonça	2:49
3.	"Vivo sonhando"	Tom Jobim	2:10
4.	"Aquarela do Brasil"	Ary Barroso	3:28
5.	"This masquerade"	Leon Russel	3:56
6.	"Shiny stockings"	Frank Foster	3:01
7.	"Nica's Dream"	Horace Silver	4:55
8.	"Arrastão"	Edu Lobo	2:39
9.	"Manhã de Carnaval"	Luís Bonfá, Antonio Maria	4:44
10.	"Autumn leaves"	Emile Kosmar, Johnny Mercer	2:50
11.	"Eu e a brisa"	Johnny Alf	3:38
12.	"Tema da vitória"	Eduardo Souto Neto	2:50
