= Däfos =

Live album by Mickey Hart, Airto Moreira, and Flora Purim
- Released: 1983
- Recorded: October 24, 1982; March 21, 1983
- Venue: The Japan Center Theatre, San Francisco, California
- Genre: Jazz, Latin
- Length: 33:33
- Label: Reference Recordings; RR-12
- Producer: Mickey Hart, Airto Moreira

Mickey Hart chronology
The Apocalypse Now Sessions (1980)	Däfos (1983)	Yamantaka (1983)

Däfos is a live album by percussionists Mickey Hart and Airto Moreira (credited as "Airto") and vocalist Flora Purim. It was recorded at the Japan Center Theatre in San Francisco, California, in 1982 and 1983, and was initially released in 1983 by Reference Recordings. It was later reissued by Rykodisc as part of their series titled "The World", and is included in the Smithsonian Folkways Mickey Hart Collection. The reissue includes a bonus track that was recorded in 1984 at Fantasy Studios in Berkeley, California.

The album is percussion-oriented, and presents a musical ethnography of a fictional country called Däfos. When asked about the meaning of the name, Hart replied: "It isn't really anything. It's a place that Airto and I conjured in our minds."

== Reception ==
Professional ratings
Review scores
Source	Rating
AllMusic	3.5/5 stars
The Virgin Encyclopedia of Jazz	3/5 stars

In a review for AllMusic, Lindsay Planer called the album "a collection of ambient soundscapes adorned by an array of indigenous hand and mallet-struck percussion," and noted that it "garnered substantial notice from audiophiles" upon its release.

Author Oliver Trager described the album as "an established audiophile classic" thanks to its "thrilling, nearly overpowering sonics."

== Track listing ==
1. "Dry Sands of the Desert" (Mickey Hart, Steve Douglas, Shabda Khan, Hamza El Din) – 5:05
2. "Ice of the North" (Mickey Hart, Jody Diamond) – 1:20
3. "Reunion I / Reunion II / Reunion III" (Bobby Vega, Flora Purim, Airto Moreira, Mickey Hart) – 9:52
4. "Saudaçao Popular" (Mickey Hart, Airto Moreira, Flora Purim, José Lorenzo, Batucaje) – 5:12
5. "Psychopomp" (Mickey Hart) – 4:57 (bonus track on reissue)
6. "Subterranean Caves of Kronos" (Mickey Hart) – 2:12
7. "The Gates of Däfos" (Mickey Hart) – 3:55
8. "Passage" (Mickey Hart, Airto Moreira, Flora Purim, José Lorenzo) – 10:55
- "Psychopomp" was recorded on September 25, 1984, at Fantasy Studios in Berkeley, California. Remaining tracks were recorded on October 24, 1982, and March 21, 1983, at the Japan Center Theatre in San Francisco, California.

== Personnel ==
Musicians

- Mickey Hart – tars (track 1), saron (track 2), percussion (tracks 3 and 8), berimbau (track 4), vocals (tracks 4 and 8), beam (track 5), rain stick (track 5), tubular bells (track 6), the Beast (track 7)
- Airto Moreira – percussion (tracks 3, 4, and 8), vocals (track 8)
- Flora Purim – vocals (tracks 3, 4, and 8), percussion (track 8)
- Steve Douglas – woodwinds (track 1)
- Shabda Khan – tars (track 1)
- Daniel Kennedy – tars (track 1)
- Mica Katz – tars (track 1)
- Khadija Mastah – tars (track 1)
- Ray Patch – tars (track 1)
- Habib Bishop – tars (track 1)
- Brian Crittenden – tars (track 1)
- Jody Diamond – saron (track 2)
- Bobby Vega – electric bass (track 3)
- Marcos Antonio Dias – vocals (track 4)
- Batucaje – percussion, berimbau, backup vocals (tracks 4 and 8)
- Jose Lorenzo – percussion, vocals (track 8)

Production

- Produced by Mickey Hart and Airto Moreira
- Recording engineer: Keith O. Johnson
- Remote engineer for "Psychopomp" and "Reunion": Tom Flye
- Technical assistance: Bob Hodas, Jeff Sterling
- Executive producers: J. Tamblyn Henderson, Marcia Martin
- Digital transfer and CD mastering: Joe Gastwirt
- Cover photography: Tony Plewik, John Werner
- Däfos logo: Alton Kelly
- Package design: J.E. Tully
