= Leny Andrade =

Brazilian jazz and bossa nova singer (1943–2023)

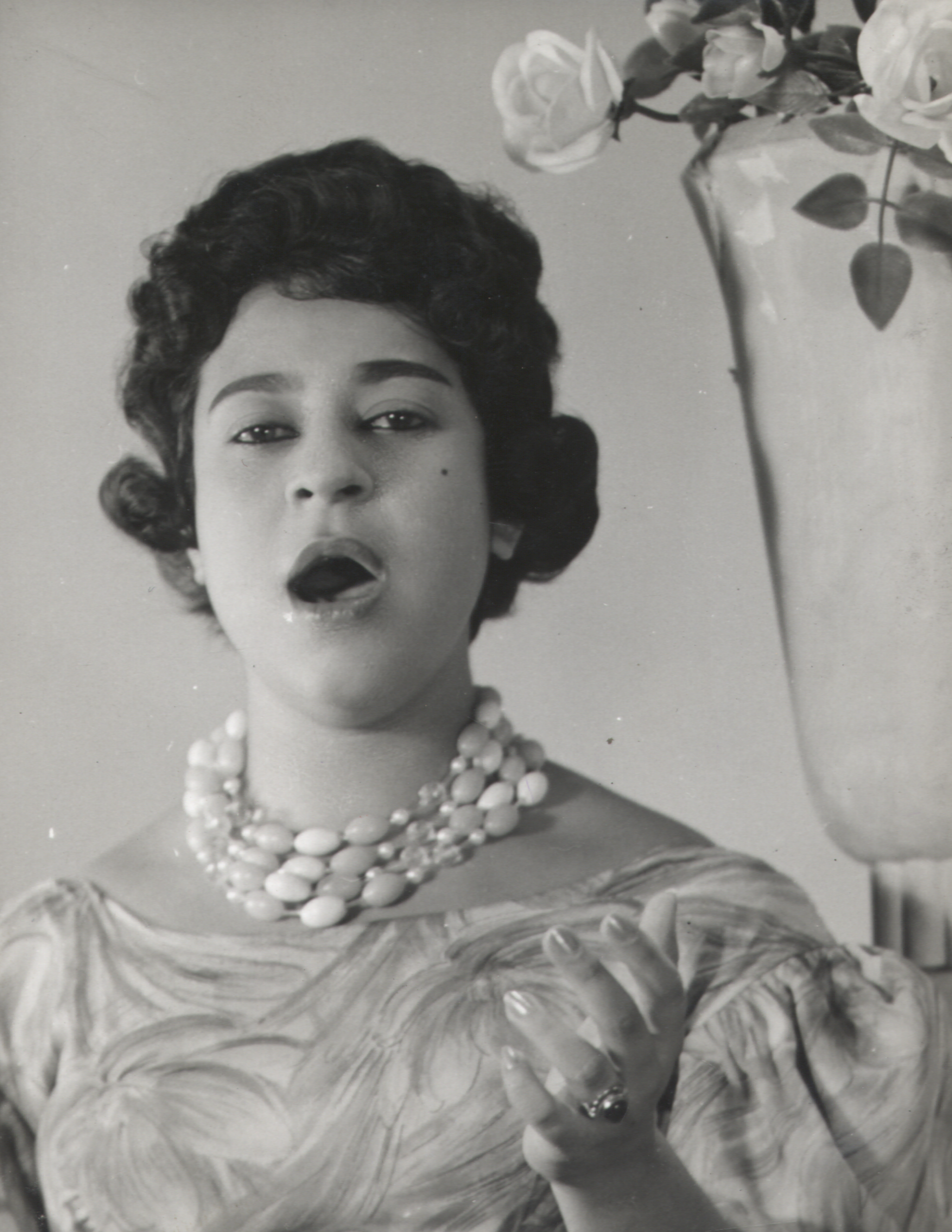
- Andrade in 1961

Background information
- Born: Leny de Andrade Lima; 25 January 1943; Rio de Janeiro, Brazil
- Died: 24 July 2023 (aged 80) Rio de Janeiro, Brazil
- Genres: Bossa nova, Brazilian jazz, MPB
- Occupations: Singer
- Instruments: Vocals
- Years active: 1958–2023

Leny de Andrade Lima (25 January 1943 – 24 July 2023), known professionally as Leny Andrade, was a Brazilian singer whose career spanned more than six decades. Emerging from Rio de Janeiro's nightclub scene in the late 1950s, she developed a style that joined the rhythmic pulse of samba and bossa nova with jazz phrasing and improvisation. Her low, husky voice and use of scat singing became recurring parts of her performances and recordings.

Andrade recorded more than 30 albums and spent much of her career performing outside Brazil, particularly in Mexico, the United States and Europe. Her repertoire moved between samba, bossa nova, MPB, bolero and jazz standards, while improvisation remained a constant in her singing. In 2007, she and pianist César Camargo Mariano won the Latin Grammy Award for Best MPB Album for Ao Vivo.

== Early life ==
Leny de Andrade Lima was born in Rio de Janeiro on 25 January 1943. (Note: Dicionário Cravo Albin da Música Popular Brasileira and The Washington Post give her birth date as 26 January 1943.) Her mother was a music teacher, and Andrade began learning classical piano from her as a child. She continued her piano studies from the age of six and later received a scholarship to attend the Conservatório Brasileiro de Música.

Andrade was also singing while still a child. At nine, she appeared on Clube do Guri on Rádio Tupi, where she sang Ary Barroso's "Risque". She later remembered that her choice surprised the program's presenter and guitarist because of her age. Other radio appearances followed, including programs hosted by Silveira Lima and César de Alencar.

By her teens, Andrade wanted to sing professionally. In 1958, at the age of fifteen, she began working as a crooner with the orchestra of Permínio Gonçalves. Her half-brother Dudu, a saxophonist and flautist, introduced her to musicians and the clubs where they performed. Around the same years, she was listening closely to Dolores Duran. Andrade heard Duran improvise without words and began trying the technique herself, an early encounter with the kind of vocal improvisation she would keep exploring in her own singing.

== Career ==
By 1961, Andrade was singing in the clubs of Beco das Garrafas in Copacabana. At the Bacará she performed with an early trio led by Sérgio Mendes, and she also sang at the nearby Bottles Bar. Her first album, A Sensação, was released by RCA Victor that year. She was already using scat on the record, a technique she kept using for decades. In 1962, she joined Dick Farney's orchestra in São Paulo. Her second LP, A Arte Maior de Leny Andrade, followed in 1963, with musicians including drummer Milton Banana.

She had already sung outside Brazil by then, including a short engagement in Buenos Aires. In 1965, she joined Pery Ribeiro and Bossa Três in Gemini V, a nightclub show at the Porão 73 in Rio de Janeiro directed by Ronaldo Bôscoli and Luiz Carlos Miele. The show was released as a live album. Andrade also recorded Estamos Aí that year, and its title song became a regular part of her repertoire.

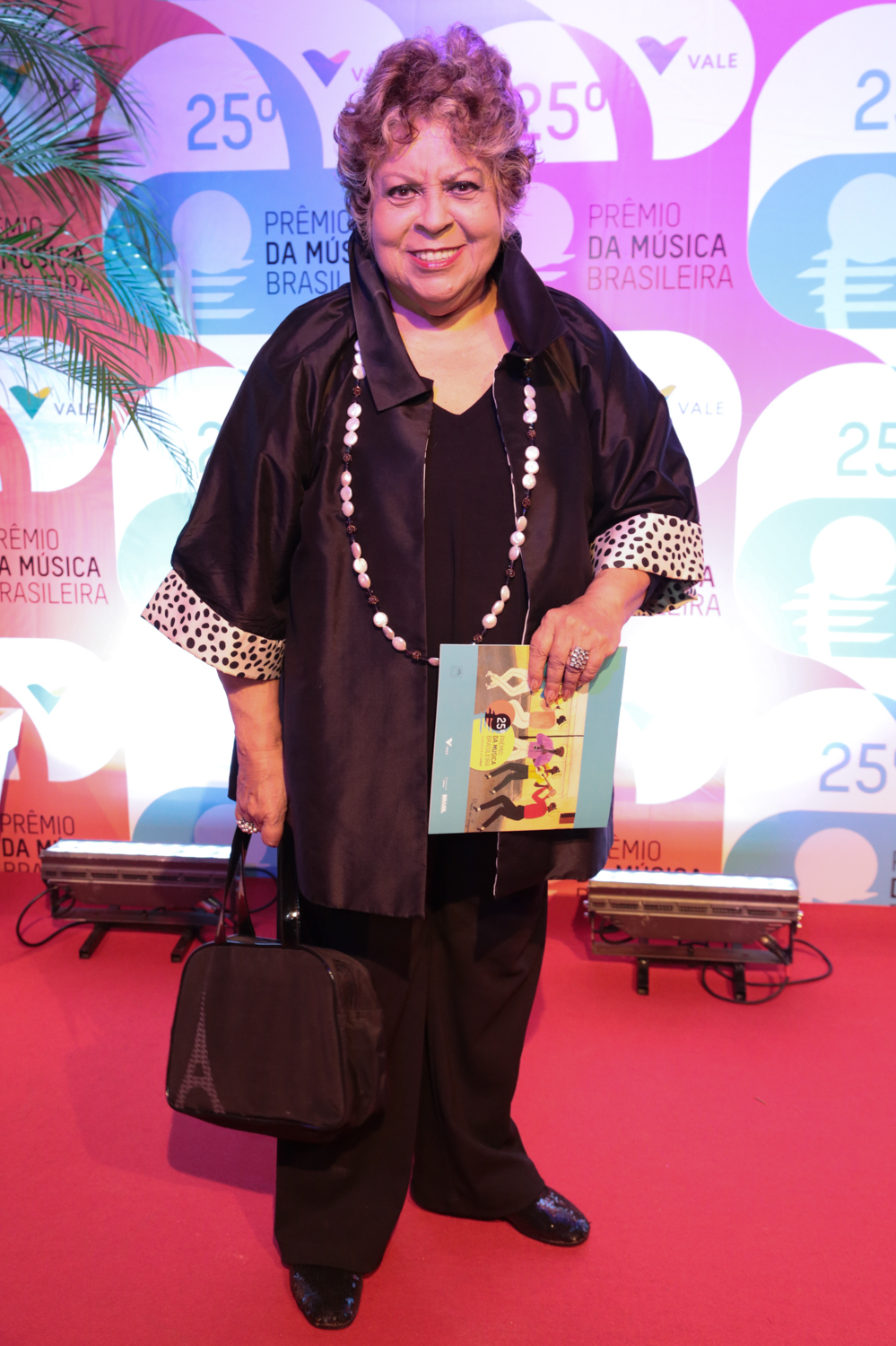
Andrade at the 25th Prêmio da Música Brasileira in 2014

Gemini V went to Mexico City, and Andrade moved to Mexico in 1966. She performed there frequently with Ribeiro before returning to Brazil by the early 1970s. She began singing more bolero while living in Mexico and kept the genre in her repertoire afterward. She also met Ella Fitzgerald and Sarah Vaughan when they visited the country.

Andrade and Ribeiro worked together again on Gemini Cinco Anos Depois in 1972. The album included Antônio Carlos Jobim's "Águas de Março" and Caetano Veloso's "Como Dois e Dois". After that, her 1970s recordings leaned more toward samba and MPB. Alvoroço followed in 1973, and that year she also appeared with Márcia, Simone and Ari Vilela on the live album Expo-Som 73. Her 1975 album included music by Wilson Moreira and Egberto Gismonti. Registro, released in 1979, included Johnny Alf's "Nós".

In 1983, Andrade recorded the double album Leny Andrade ao Vivo – Volumes 1 e 2 at the RCA Victor auditorium in Rio. The album included "Cantor da Noite", written for her by Ivan Lins and Vitor Martins. That year she also made her New York debut at the Blue Note, accompanied by drummer Portinho, trumpeter Claudio Roditi, pianist Aluizio Milanês and bassist Lincoln Goines. A New York Times review praised the speed and agility of her scat singing and compared it with Fitzgerald's.

Her late-1980s records included an album of songs by Cartola and Luz Neon. She sang bossa nova again on the 1991 album Bossa Nova. On Embraceable You, recorded in the Netherlands, she sang American standards in Brazilian arrangements. In 1992 she spent four nights at the Ballroom in Manhattan, where her performances drew strong reviews. She kept an apartment in New York for years and returned often to American stages, including Birdland, Jazz at Lincoln Center and the Hollywood Bowl.

During the 1990s, Andrade recorded with musicians who became frequent collaborators. She made Nós with pianist César Camargo Mariano, Maiden Voyage with Fred Hersch, and the voice-and-guitar album Coisa Fina with Romero Lubambo. In 1995, she and pianist Cristóvão Bastos recorded an album of songs written by Jobim without lyric-writing partners. She also released Luz Negra, an album of songs by Nelson Cavaquinho.

In 2000, Andrade appeared with Gilson Peranzzetta and Guilherme de Brito in A Histórica Parceria, a program about Nelson Cavaquinho presented at the Centro Cultural Banco do Brasil in Rio. She also released an album of songs by Altay Veloso. Andrade returned to Lubambo for Lua do Arpoador in 2006. She also recorded Ao Vivo with Mariano at the Teatro Guaíra in Curitiba. The album won the Latin Grammy Award for Best MPB Album in 2007.

Andrade and Lubambo performed together at the Umbria Jazz Festival in Italy in 2009. She released Alma Mia in 2010 and again sang the boleros she had carried with her since Mexico. Canciones del Rey, recorded in Spanish with songs by Roberto Carlos, followed in 2013. She recorded Alegria de Viver with guitarist Roni Ben-Hur in 2015.

Falls began to make performing more difficult as Andrade grew older. In May 2016, she fell while walking onto the stage at Birdland but finished the performance. She kept singing in the years that followed and often performed seated. Her 2018 releases included Bossa Nossa, an album of songs by Fred Falcão, and a recording of music by Cartola and Nelson Cavaquinho with Gilson Peranzzetta. One of her final public performances was with Peranzzetta in 2019.

== Style and reception ==
Andrade had a low, husky voice, and she sang bossa nova with more force than the quiet, intimate manner heard in many early recordings of the genre. Jazz phrasing was part of her singing, but the pulse was often samba. Composer Carlos Lyra heard in her singing the swing of Sarah Vaughan, Ella Fitzgerald and Carmen McRae, and set her apart from the lighter bossa nova vocal style.

Scat was part of Andrade's singing from the beginning. When she left the lyrics for a passage, she improvised with wordless syllables and used her voice much like another musician might use an instrument. In 1960, she called herself "a musician who sings". Lívia Scarinci Nestrovski studied Andrade's recordings from 1958 to 1965 for a master's thesis. She found that Andrade kept the improvisational structure of jazz scat but used syllables and accents that sounded closer to Brazilian Portuguese and samba. Nestrovski called the result a form of Brazilian scat singing.

Dolores Duran was one of Andrade's early musical models. As a teenager, Andrade heard Duran improvise without words and began trying the technique herself. Duran's songs stayed in Andrade's repertoire for decades, alongside bossa nova, samba and samba-canção. She also kept singing boleros after returning from Mexico. Later albums sometimes placed Brazilian songs beside American standards.

Andrade worked on the arrangements of some of her recordings as well. Credits name her as a co-arranger on songs from Luz Neon, Eu Quero Ver, Coisa Fina, the Jobim album recorded with Cristóvão Bastos, and Lua do Arpoador. Roni Ben-Hur recalled that she preferred to start playing and let an arrangement develop in the room instead of fixing every detail beforehand.

Reviews of Andrade's American performances often returned to her improvisation. A 1983 New York Times review of her Blue Note debut compared the speed of her scat singing with Fitzgerald's. A review of her 1992 Ballroom engagement heard a resemblance to Vaughan. After a 2008 performance at Birdland, Stephen Holden wrote in The New York Times that Andrade's voice "seems to contain the body and soul of Brazil". Tony Bennett called her "one of the greatest improvisers in the world".

Some musicians wrote or recorded pieces for Andrade. Paquito D'Rivera recorded "For Leny (Andrade)" on his 1987 album Manhattan Burn. Vitor Martins and Ivan Lins wrote "Cantor da Noite" with Andrade in mind, and she recorded the song on her 1983 live album.

== Final years and death ==
Andrade moved to the Retiro dos Artistas in Rio de Janeiro in early 2019. The move was her own choice, and she continued to rehearse and perform while living there. She spoke warmly about her small house and the care she received from the staff.

In August 2022, Andrade returned to the studio with pianist Gilson Peranzzetta to record Antônio Carlos Jobim and Dolores Duran's "Por Causa de Você". She had sung the song for years but had never recorded it. The single was released in January 2023, around her 80th birthday.

Andrade had been living with Lewy body dementia and was treated for pneumonia in June 2023. After returning to the Retiro dos Artistas, her health worsened and she was admitted to the Hospital de Clínicas de Jacarepaguá. She died there on 24 July, aged 80.

Dóris Monteiro, one of Andrade's longtime friends and one of the singers she admired, died in Rio on the same day, aged 88. The two women had been honored together at the Feira de Vinil do Rio in 2019. Their wakes were held together at the Theatro Municipal on 25 July. Andrade was cremated later that day at Memorial do Carmo.

== Selected discography ==
The following is a selection from Andrade's discography.

- A Sensação (RCA Victor, 1961)
- A Arte Maior de Leny Andrade (Polydor, 1963)
- Gemini V, with Pery Ribeiro and Bossa Três (Odeon, 1965)
- Estamos Aí (Odeon, 1965)
- Gemini Cinco Anos Depois, with Pery Ribeiro (Odeon, 1972)
- Alvoroço (Odeon, 1973)
- Leny Andrade (Odeon, 1975)
- Registro (Columbia, 1979)
- Leny Andrade ao vivo – Volumes 1 e 2 (1983)
- Luz Neon (Eldorado, 1989)
- Eu Quero Ver (Eldorado, 1990)
- Bossa Nova (Eldorado, 1991)
- Embraceable You (Timeless, 1991)
- Nós, with César Camargo Mariano (Velas, 1994)
- Maiden Voyage, with Fred Hersch (Chesky, 1994)
- Coisa Fina, with Romero Lubambo (1994)
- Antonio Carlos Jobim, Letra e Música, with Cristóvão Bastos (Lumiar Discos, 1995)
- Luz Negra – Nelson Cavaquinho por Leny Andrade (Velas, 1995)
- Bossas Novas (Albatroz, 1998)
- E Quero Que a Canção Seja Você (Albatroz, 2001)
- Lua do Arpoador, with Romero Lubambo (Biscoito Fino, 2006)
- Ao Vivo, with César Camargo Mariano (Albatroz, 2006)
- Alma Mia (Fina Flor, 2010)
- Canciones del Rey (2013)
- Iluminados – Leny Andrade Canta Ivan Lins & Vítor Martins (2014)
- Alegria de Viver, with Roni Ben-Hur (Motéma, 2015)
- Bossa Nossa – Leny Andrade Canta Fred Falcão (Biscoito Fino, 2018)
- Canções de Cartola e Nelson Cavaquinho, with Gilson Peranzzetta (Fina Flor, 2018)
- "Por Causa de Você", with Gilson Peranzzetta (single, 2023)

== See also ==
- Music of Brazil
- Samba-jazz
- List of Brazilian musicians
