= Imyra, Tayra, Ipy - Taiguara =

Studio album by Taiguara
- Released: 1976
- Recorded: 1976
- Genre: MPB; Jazz; progressive rock
- Length: 42:47
- Label: EMI-Odeon (LP); Kuarup (CD)
- Producer: Wagner Tiso

Taiguara chronology
Let the Children Hear the Music (1973)	Imyra, Tayra, Ipy - Taiguara (1976)	Canções de Amor e Liberdade (1983)

Imyra, Tayra, Ipy - Taiguara is an album by the Brazilian singer-songwriter Taiguara, released by EMI-Odeon on 1976 (LP), by EMI-Toshiba exclusively in Japan on 2002 and, after an exhaustive years long campaign to “re-patriate” the album censored in Brazil nearly 30 years, via an independent website ran by daughter Imyra, finally, released on 2013, by Kuarup (CD).

== Track listing ==
No.	Title	Length
1.	"Pianice (Pecinha Sinfônica)" (Taiguara)
2.	"Delírio Transatlântico e Chegada no Rio" (Taiguara)
3.	"Público" (Taiguara)
4.	"Terra das Palmeiras" (Taiguara)
5.	"Como em Guernica" (Taiguara)
6.	"A Volta do Pássaro Ameríndio" (Taiguara)
7.	"Luanda Violeta Africana" (Taiguara)
8.	"Aquarela de Um País na Lua" (Taiguara)
9.	"Situação" (Taiguara)
10.	"Sete cenas de Imyra" (Taiguara)
11.	"Três Pontas" (Words: Ronaldo Bastos / Music: Milton Nascimento)
12.	"Samba das cinco" (Taiguara)
13.	"Primeira Bateria" (Taiguara)
14.	"Outra cena" (Taiguara)

== Personnel ==
=== Musicians ===
- Taiguara - vocals, piano, mellotron
- Hermeto Pascoal - flute
- Toninho Horta - guitar
- Nivaldo Ornelas - saxofone
- Wagner Tiso - piano, keyboard
- Mauro Senise - flute
- J.T. Meirelles - flute
- Raul Mascarenhas - flute
- Netinho - flute
- Macacheira - trombone
- Novelli - bass
- Zé Eduardo Nazário - percussion
- Paulo Braga - drums
- Jaques Morelenbaum - cello
- Ubirajara Silva - bandoneon
- Lúcia Morelenbaum - harp

=== Production ===
- Taiguara - orchestral arrangements
- Wagner Tiso - producer
