= Xavana: an Island of Love =

1981 studio album by Hareton Salvanini

Soundtrack album by Hareton Salvanini
- Released: 1981

Xavana: an Island of Love is a 1981 studio album by Brazilian musician Hareton Salvanini. It's a soundtrack of a film of the same name.

== Track listing ==
=== Side A ===
No.	Title	Writer(s)	Length
1.	"Com Os Raios Do Sol"	Marcelo Silva, Salvanini	2:52
2.	"Xavana"	João Pataro, Luis Fernandes Morais	3:00
3.	"Zona Sul"	Jerônimo Jardim	3:36
4.	"Luz Da Manhã"	Jardim	3:11
5.	"Feita Em Ar"	Jardim	2:24
6.	"Um Novo Dia"	Salvanini	1:30
7.	"Nostalgia"	Salvanini	2:44
8.	"Luana"	Salvanini	2:15

=== Side B ===
No.	Title	Writer(s)	Length
1.	"Growing"	Salvanini	4:15
2.	"Xavana" (mystic version)	Pataro, Morais	3:04
3.	"Com Os Raios Do Sol"	Salvanini, Silva	2:43
4.	"Olhe Menina"	Pataro	3:29
5.	"Dia Cedo"	Walter Santos Pinto	2:53
6.	"Saudades Do Amor"	Salvanini	3:19
7.	"Solidão"	Salvanini	2:16

== Personnel ==
- Acoustic guitar: Alberto de Mello, Carlos Liboredo, João Pataro, Walter Santos
- Vocals, piano, drums, clarinet, flugelhorn, trumpet, electric piano: Hareton Salvanini
- Bass: Luca Maciel
- Drums: Waltinho Luz
