= Rabo de Lagartixa =

Brazilian choro group

Rabo de Lagartixa ("gecko's tail") is a Brazilian instrumental Choro ensemble founded in 1993 by Daniela Spielmann on Saxophone(soprano and alto), Alessandro Valente and Jayme Vignoli on cavaquinho, Marcello Gonçalves on Seven-string guitar, Alexandre Brasil on Double Bass (acoustic and electric) and Beto Cazes on Percussions.

== Discography ==
- Quebra-queixo (1998) Malandro Records CD
- 1º Compasso. Samba e Choro (Vários) (2001) Selo Biscoito Fino CD
- 2º Compasso. Samba e Choro (Vários) (2001) Selo Biscoito Fino CD
