= Sambalanço Trio =

- Origin: São Paulo, Brazil
- Genres: Samba, bossa nova, jazz, sambalanço
- Years active: 1964–1965
- Labels: Som Maior, RCA, Audio Fidelity, Elenco
- Members: Cesar Camargo Mariano; Humberto Clayber; Airto Moreira

Sambalanço Trio was a Brazilian samba-jazz group formed by Cesar Camargo Mariano (piano), Humberto Clayber (bass) and Airto Moreira (drums). The band started to play in 1964 and lasted for about two years. Their albums are considered some of the most important works of that period and influenced many other groups of samba and jazz.

== History ==
The group was created in 1964, in São Paulo, Brazil. They played in the opening show of João Sebastião Bar, one of the foremost bossa nova nightclubs in the city, where they became the favourite attraction. In this nightclub, the group met the American dancer Lennie Dale, a future collaborator. The Sambalanço Trio offered a fusion of bossa nova and jazz, which became a cornerstone of Brazilian popular music of the period.

In the same year the band was formed, it released two albums: the first was Sambalanço Trio; the second, Samblues. In 1965, they joined musician Raul de Souza and recorded À vontade mesmo. Also in 1965, the group recorded its fourth album, Reencontro com Sambalanço Trio.

In 1965, Sambalanço Trio with Lennie Dale collaborated in a theatrical presentation performed in Rio de Janeiro and São Paulo for eight months. This work was later recorded and released as Lennie Dale & Sambalanço Trio no Zum Zum, earning awards by Jornal do Brasil as Best Album and Best Show.

In 1965, the group's original pianist Cesar Camargo left, following his soon to be wife. Airto Moreira asked Hermeto Pascoal to replace Camargo, to which Pascoal agreed on the condition they rename Sambalanço Trio to Sambrasa Trio. In this new formation with Airto Moreira, Humberto Clayber and Hermeto Pascoal, Sambrasa Trio released Em Som Maior (1965). The new formation lasted about a year

Sambalanço Trio dissolved in 1965. Immediately after, Airto Moreira together with leftist protest singer Geraldo Vandré founded the hugely influential Quarteto Novo with Hermeto Pascoal, Heraldo do Monte (guitar and viola caipira) and Theo de Barros (bass). Following Quarteto Novo's dissolution in 1969, Airto moved to the United States with his wife and singer Flora Purim, starting a successful solo career.

Following their work in Sambalanço Trio, Cesar Camargo Mariano became a member of Som Três and an arranger for singers Wilson Simonal and Elis Regina. Humberto Clayber continued playing in other samba-jazz bands.

== Discography ==
- 1964: Sambalanço Trio (Audio Fidelity)
- 1965: Improviso Negro (Ubatuqui)
- 1965: À vontade mesmo (RCA) with Raul de Souza
- 1965: Reencontro com Sambalanço Trio (Som Maior)
- 1965: Lennie Dale & Sambalanço Trio no Zum Zum (Elenco) with Lennie Dale
