= A Virgem de Saint Tropez =

Soundtrack of a 1974 film

Studio album by Hareton Salvanini
- Released: May 14, 1974
- Recorded: 1974
- Genre: bossa nova
- Length: 37:01
- Label: Continental
- Producer: Beto Ruschel

Hareton Salvanini chronology
SP/73 (1973)	A Virgem de Saint Tropez (1974)	Hareton Salvanini (1977)

A Virgem de Saint Tropez is a 1974 soundtrack album by Hareton Salvanini, released for the film of the same name.

== Track listing ==
Written by Beto Ruschel and Hareton Salvanini except where noted

=== Side one ===
No.	Title	Writer(s)	Length
1.	"You Can't Run Away from Your Destiny"	Zygmunt Sulistrowski, Ruschel, Salvanini	2:32
2.	"Espairecendo"		3:38
3.	"Ansiedade"		1:46
4.	"São Paulo"		1:08
5.	"Panorama"		1:29
6.	"Amazonia"		2:18
7.	"Saint Tropez"		3:15
8.	"Quarto Do Hotel"		2:42

=== Side two ===
No.	Title	Writer(s)	Length
1.	"Copacabana Rock"		4:23
2.	"Dois E O Mar"		3:17
3.	"Perseguição"	Ayrton Salvanini	2:14
4.	"Seios"		3:22
5.	"Despedida"		3:24
6.	"Não Podes Fugir Do Teu Destino"		2:18

== Personnel ==
- Alto saxophone: José Ferreira Godinho (Casé)
- Electric piano, vibraphone: Hareton Salvanini
- Bass: Gabriel Bahlis
- Drums: Antonio de Almeida
- Guitar: Heraldo do Monte
- Oboe: Francesco Pezzella
- Percussion: Rubens Souza Soares (Rubão)
- Producer: Beto Ruschel
- Trombone: Severino Gomes da Silva (Biu)

== Reception ==
Vice.com calls this album "a fascinating musical journey that begins in Brazil but extends to the cosmos, an eclectic adventure befitting its nature as a soundtrack, but also reflecting the restlessness of a versatile composer".
