= Taiguara =

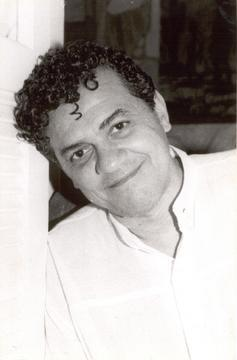

Background information
- Also known as: Taiguara
- Born: Taiguara Chalar da Silva; 9 October 1945
- Origin: Brazil, although born in Uruguay
- Died: 14 February 1996 (aged 50)
- Genres: MPB, samba, bossa nova, Jazz
- Occupations: Musician, Composer, Songwriter, Singer, Pianist, Orchestrator
- Instruments: Voice, Piano, Acoustic Guitar
- Years active: 1965–1996
- Labels: EMI/Odeon, Phillips, Continental, Movieplay
- Website: www.taiguara.com

Taiguara Chalar da Silva (9 October 1945 in Montevideo – 14 February 1996 in São Paulo), whose stage name was Taiguara, was a Brazilian singer and songwriter.

Taiguara was one of the most censored Brazilian artists to date, having over 200 songs vetoed throughout his career. Some of his biggest hits were "Universo No Teu Corpo", "Teu Sonho Não Acabou", "Viagem", "Berço de Marcela", "Que as Crianças Cantem Livres", "Hoje", "Amanda", "Carne e Osso", "Geração 70" and "Mudou". Not unlike many MPB artists, Taiguara composed his own music, with the distinction that most of his work was composed on his own, with very few collaborations with other songwriters throughout his career.

== First years ==
Taiguara was born in Montevideo, Uruguay as his father toured the country as a musician, but grew up in Rio and later moved to São Paulo, then back to Rio for the remainder of most of his career, except when in exile. While attending Law School at Mackenzie University, he became increasingly involved with student organized recitals and performances, eventually abandoning the course altogether to pursue a musical career full-time. In 1964, he joined the Sambalanço Trio and started receiving media attention, which yielded his first offer from record label Phillips. In 1965, Taiguara recorded his first of several albums, and in the following years won many festivals, and with the skyrocketing fame that came with all the media attention, he eventually became the best selling artist of EMI-Odeon in Brazil, until he was pushed into an abrupt exile in order to avoid torture or worse, as many of his peers at the time were forced to endure.

== Exile ==
Due to a series of disagreements with the military dictators in power, his career in Brazil was interrupted in the mid-1970s and he was forced to move abroad, settling in London, where he studied regency at Guildhall School of Music and Drama, played with the London Symphony Orchestra and recorded the album Let the Children Hear the Music. The album set a precedent, as it became the first foreign recording by a Brazilian musician censored in Brazil (the same record was never released in England either, having been deemed "misplaced" by the studios). During a second exile, Taiguara also lived in Spain, Paris and a few African countries, mainly Tanzania, where he studied Journalism for a year, as well as Ethiopia.

== Political views and last years ==
Always troubled by the harsh reality of the less fortunate, Taiguara increasingly leaned towards leftist views, later becoming involved with political activities which rallied for a fairer future and social and economical equality for all. Although he was never officially affiliated with any political parties, communist leader Luis Carlos Prestes became a great friend and mentor in his later years. Taiguara composed and recorded the song "O Cavaleiro da Esperança" {The Hope Knight} in his honour.

Thirteen years after performing in Brazil for the last time, Taiguara returned with the concert "Thirteen Octobers" and released two more albums: "Cançoes de Amor e Liberdade" {Songs of love and Freedom} (1984) and "Brazil Afri" {Afro Brasil} (1994) in the following years. On 14 February 1996 he died from bladder cancer. His last project, an album of songs that celebrated and examined the joys and hardships of the poor living on the slums of Rio de Janeiro, never came to completion.

== Discography ==
=== Studio albums ===
- Taiguara! (1965)
- Crônica da Cidade Amada (With Paulo Autran, Rio 65, Portinho e sua orquestra and Blecaute) (1966)
- Primeiro Tempo 5x0 (With Claudete Soares) (1966)
- Taiguara (Also known as O Vencedor de Festivais) (1968)
- Hoje (1969)
- Viagem (1970)
- Carne e Osso (1971)
- Piano e Viola (1972)
- Fotografias (1973)
- Let the Children Hear the Music (album censured and never released, today lost) (1974)
- Imyra, Tayra, Ipy - Taiguara (1976)
- Canções de Amor e Liberdade (1983)
- Brasil Afri (1994)

== See also ==
- Taiguara performing one of his greatest hits, "Universo No Teu Corpo" on YouTube.
- Taiguara performing another one of his popular compositions, "Teu Sonho Não Acabou" on YouTube.
- Taiguara performing "The Cavalier of Hope" on YouTube song dedicated to Luis Carlos Prestes
- Taiguara performing "Imagine", by John Lennon on YouTube.
