= Manfredo Fest =

Brazilian pianist and keyboardist

- Born: Manfredo Irmin Fest; May 13, 1936; Porto Alegre, Rio Grande do Sul, Brazil
- Died: October 8, 1999 (aged 63) Tampa Bay, Florida, U.S.
- Genres: bossa nova, jazz, blues
- Occupations: Musician, composer
- Instruments: Piano, organ, saxophone
- Years active: 1962–97

Manfredo Irmin Fest (May 13, 1936 – October 8, 1999) was a bossa nova and jazz pianist, keyboardist, and bandleader from Brazil. Legally blind, he was born in Porto Alegre, Rio Grande do Sul, Brazil, and he died at 63 years old in Tampa Bay, Florida. He was husband of the composer Lili Fest and father of the guitarist Phill Fest.

== Biography ==
Manfredo Fest was of German descent: his father was a concert pianist from Germany who taught at University in Porto Alegre. Although he was blind, Fest learned to read music in Braille. His initial musical training had been classical, but at 17 years old, he became interested in the jazz works of George Shearing and Bill Evans. At college he gained steady work playing bossa nova in São Paulo.

In 1961, Fest graduated in piano from the University of Rio Grande do Sul. He also learned to play keyboards and saxophone. One year later, he started his musical career playing in bars, clubs and pubs. In 1963, he recorded his first LP, called Bossa nova, nova bossa. In this album, he counted with Humberto Clayber (bass), Antonio Pinheiro (drums) and Hector Costita (saxophone and flute).

In the 1970s he traveled to the United States where he worked with Sérgio Mendes. His American debut album Manifestations was released in 1978. He was relatively obscure, but worked with noteworthy groups including Béla Fleck and the Flecktones. Fest was a semi-regular at Fandango's on Siesta Key, near Sarasota, Florida.

Fest died of liver failure at the age of 63 in Tampa, Florida, not far from his home in Palm Harbor, where he had lived for 12 years.

== Discography ==
- 1961: Classicos Dos Boleros
- 1963: Bossa nova, nova bossa
- 1963: Evolução
- 1965: Manfredo Fest Trio
- 1965: Some people
- 1966: Alma Brasiliera
- 1969: Bossa Rio
- 1970: Alegria
- 1972 After Hours
- 1972: Bossa rock blues
- 1976: Brazilian Dorian dream
- 1978: Manifestations
- 1987: Braziliana (DMP)
- 1989: Jungle Cat (DMP)
- 1992: Manfredo Fest and friends
- 1994: Oferenda
- 1995: Começar de novo (To begin again)
- 1996: Fascinating rhythm
- 1997: Amazonas
- 1998: Just Jobim (DMP) [SACD]
