= Hareton Salvanini =

Brazilian musician and composer

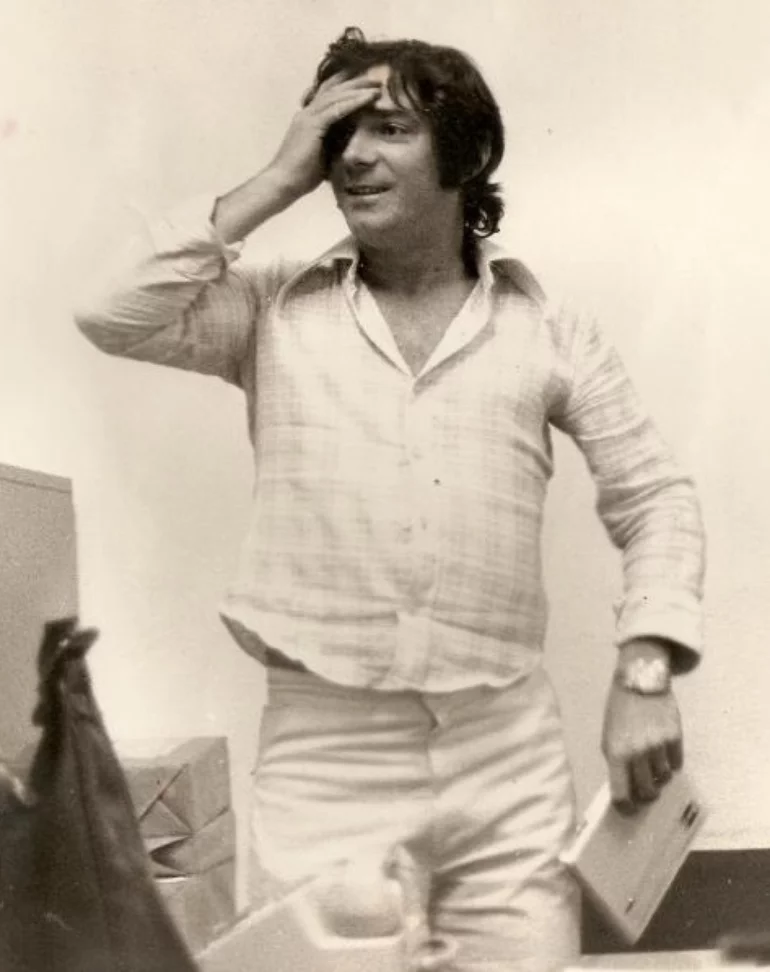

Background information
- Born: September 25, 1942; Bauru, Brazil
- Died: February 28, 2006 (aged 63) São Paulo, Brazil
- Genre: bossa nova
- Occupations: musician, composer
- Years active: 1971–2001
- Label: Continental

Hareton Salvanini was a Brazilian musician and songwriter.

== Biography ==
Hareton Salvanini was born in Bauru and grew up in Campinas, the son of singer and guitarist Luwino Salvanini. He gained prominence at the Festival of Popular Song hosted by TV Tupi in São Paulo. He then led an octet on the show Mambembe on TV Bandeirantes during the 1970s.

In 1973, Salvanini released his debut album SP/73 on Continental Records. On this album, he performed his own compositions, such as "Salamandras", "Prelúdio em si bemol menor", and "Yelris". He also co-wrote songs with his brother Ayrton Salvanini, such as "Irracional" and "Imagem". Also in 1973, he worked as arranger on the album Meu corpo, minha embalagens, todo gasto na viagem by Ednardo. In 1974, Salvanini composed "You Can't Run Away from Your Destiny" with Beto Ruschel and Dudu França for the soundtrack of the Franco-Brazilian film A Virgem de Saint Tropez.

In the 1980s, he worked for TV Globo. One of his compositions during this period is a tracked named "Futebol Internacional". In 2016, ten years after his death, Salvanini's children sued Globo for using this composition without attribution.

Between 1997 and 2001, Salvanini worked as musical director for TV Record in São Paulo, where he composed musical themes for the news program Cidade Alerta. His work has also been sampled by artists such as Marcelo D2, Guilty Simpson, and Jedi Mind Tricks.

== Discography ==
- 1973 – SP/73
- 1974 – A Virgem de Saint Tropez
- 1977 – Hareton Salvanini
- 1981 – Xavana Uma Ilha Do Amor
- 1989 – Trucker's Memories
