= Quarteto Novo =

Brazilian music group

Background information
- Origin: São Paulo, SP, Brazil
- Genres: MPB, jazz
- Years active: 1966–1969
- Labels: Odeon, EMI
- Past members: Theo de Barros, Heraldo do Monte, Airto Moreira, Hermeto Pascoal

Quarteto Novo was a Brazilian group formed in São Paulo in 1966. Their self-titled 1967 album has been cited as an influence on later jazz and pop music, and helped launch the individual careers of its members.

== History ==
Originally named Trio Novo, the group consisted of Theo de Barros (bass and guitar); Heraldo do Monte (Viola caipira and guitar) and Airto Moreira (percussion). The group was created to accompany singer/songwriter Geraldo Vandré in concert and on recordings. With the arrival of flutist Hermeto Pascoal, the group was renamed Quarteto Novo. In 1967 the group recorded their only album, Quarteto Novo (Odeon Records).

In that same year, the band backed Edu Lobo on the live performance of Ponteio, which won "Best Song" at the 3rd Festival de Música Popular Brasileira (MPB). Quarteto Novo's album won the prize for "Best Televised Recording by a Musical Group" (Troféu Imprensa) in 1967 and the Troféu Roquette Pinto.

The band toured Brazil backing Vandré on his 1968 album Canto Geral. The group disbanded in 1969. EMI Music Brasil released a CD in 2002 and a vinyl LP reissue in 2003, and EMI a European CD in 2008.

All the band members come from the northeastern part of Brazil which is known for its regional baião music style, except Airto Moreira, who is from the south of Brazil. The album was instrumental in bringing baião to a national and then international audience. Although the style is not well known outside Brazil, the album has influenced a host of popular songwriters in America, the UK, and Europe who had various hit songs using elements of baião style.

== Discography ==
Professional ratings
Review scores
| Source | Rating |
|---|---|
| AllMusic | 4.5/5 stars |

Quarteto Novo is the quartet's only album, released in 1967. NPR, as part of its "Take Five" series, called the album "a pastoral romp through the Brazilian countryside, long streamers of joy flowing behind."

== Personnel ==
- Theo de Barros - acoustic guitar (1–5, 7), bass (4, 6–8)
- Heraldo do Monte - viola caipira (1–6, 8), electric guitar (4, 6–8)
- Hermeto Pascoal - flute (1–5, 7, 8), piano (4, 6, 8)
- Airto - percussion (1–6), drums (4, 6–8)
