= Dzi Croquettes =

2009 film directed by Tatiana Issa

- Directed by: Raphael Alvarez; Tatiana Issa
- Release dates: October 4, 2009 (Rio International Film Festival); July 16, 2010 (Brazil)
- Running time: 110 minutes
- Country: Brazil
- Languages: English; French; Portuguese

Dzi Croquettes is a 2009 Brazilian documentary film directed by Tatiana Issa and Raphael Alvarez about the dance and theater group of the same name.

== Overview ==
The Dzi Croquettes were a groundbreaking dance and theater group who used their talent and a mix of humor and derision to challenge the violent dictatorship that gripped Brazil in the 1970s. Creating a new stage language that would influence an entire generation, this theater group revolutionized the gay movement despite being banned and censored by the military regime. Through interviews and archival footage of the group's performances, directors Raphael Alvarez and Tatiana Issa reveal the origin of the group, their relentless perfectionism, and their unexpected stroke of luck when Liza Minnelli becomes a godmother of sorts to them. However, it also gives an honest account of the sadness of their final years when tension, egos, AIDS, and even murder ripped them apart. The film combines candid interviews with group members and current Brazilian and International artists, showing how this group never flinched from challenging conventional notions of acceptable "masculine" or "feminine" behavior.

== Release ==
The film had its US premiere at the acclaimed MoMA (Museum of Modern Art in New York) followed by theatrical release in the United States at the IFC Village Cinemas in New York and Sunset 5 Cinemas Los Angeles, besides theatrical release in Europe and Brazil.

== Reception ==
The film received outstanding reviews in major newspapers such as New York Times, Los Angeles Times, LA Weekly, Film Journal International, Time Out New York, Village Voice, among others.

== Awards ==
- 2009 - Festival do Rio (Rio de Janeiro International Film Festival) - Best Documentary Jury Award
- 2009 - Festival do Rio (Rio de Janeiro International Film Festival) - Best Documentary Audience Award
- 2009 - São Paulo International Film Festival - Best Documentary Itamaraty Award (Foreign Ministry Award)
- 2009 - São Paulo International Film Festival - Best Documentary Audience Award
- 2009 - 17th Mix Brazil International Film Festival - Best Documentary Audience Award
- 2009 - 5th Festcine Goiania - Best Editing
- 2010 - Festival IN-EDIT 2010 - (In-Edit Documentary Film Festival) - Best Documentary Award
- 2010 - LABRFF 2010 - (Los Angeles Brazilian Film Festival) - Best Documentary Award
- 2010 - San Francisco International LGBT Film Festival - Frameline Outstanding Documentary Jury Award
- 2010 - Dance, Camera, West Los Angeles - DCW 2010 Best Outstanding Documentary Jury Award
- 2010 - Brazilian Film Festival of MIAMI Miami- Best Film By the Audience Award
- 2010 - Brazilian Film Festival of LONDON London, U.K - Best Documentary Jury Award
- 2010 - Torino International GLBT Film Festival Torino, Italy - WINNER Best Documentary Audience Award
- 2011 - SESC Best Films of the Year São Paulo, Brazil - WINNER Best Documentary of the Year
- 2011 - Brazilian Academy Awards Grande Premio do Cinema Brasileiro - Brazil. WINNER Best Documentary
- 2011 - Brazilian Academy Awards Grande Premio do Cinema Brasileiro - Brazil. WINNER Best Editing
- 2011 - Brazilian Golden Globes ACIE Foreign Press Awards - Brazil. WINNER Best Film of the Year

== See also ==
- The Cockettes, a documentary film about the San Francisco-based gay performance ensemble that inspired the Dzi Croquettes.
