= Tatiana Issa =

Brazilian actress and director

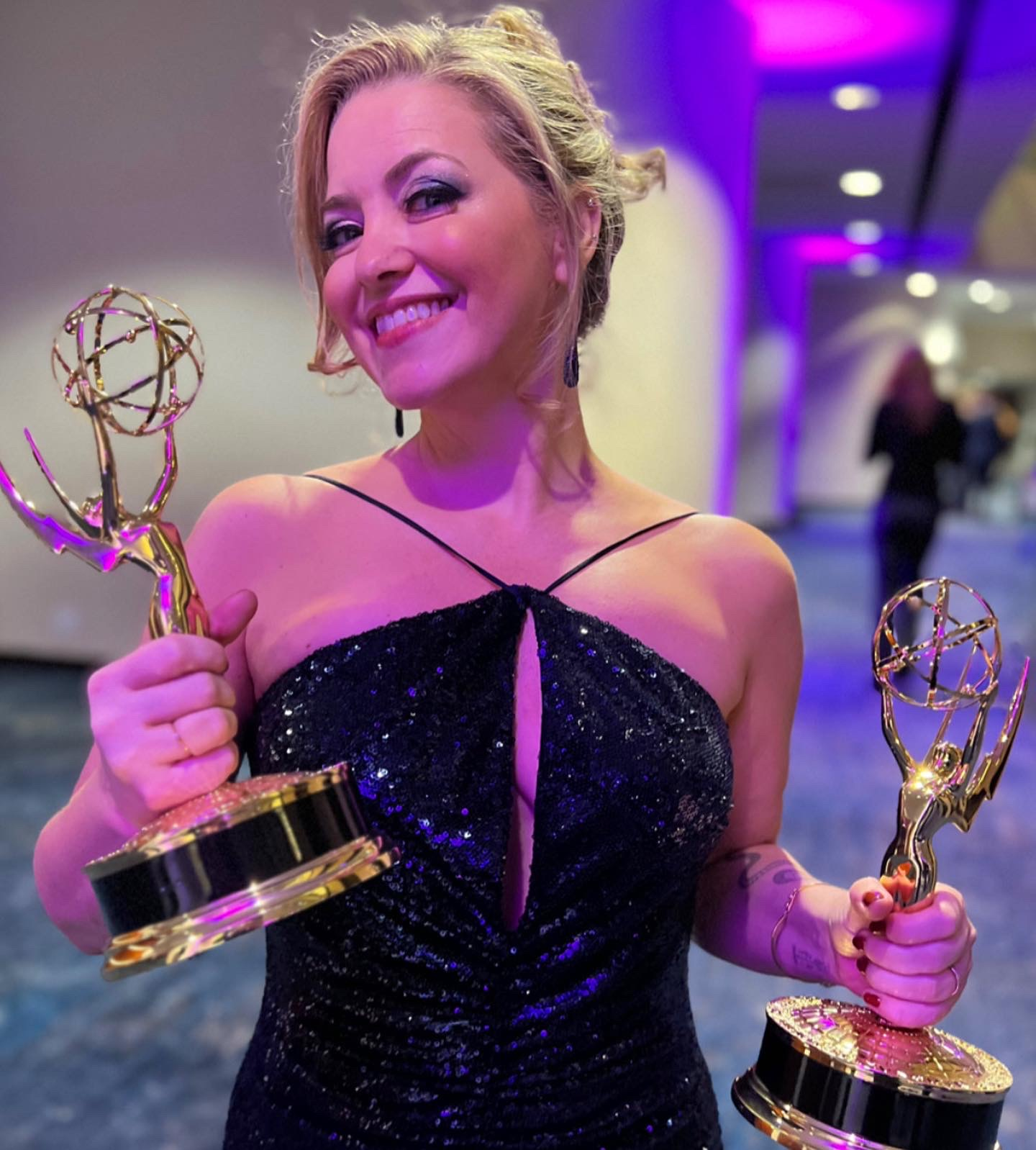
- Tatiana Issa at 2021 Emmys
- Born: January 16, 1974 (age 52); São Paulo, Brazil
- Occupations: Film director, Executive Producer, Showrunner
- Years active: 1983–present

Tatiana Issa (born January 16, 1974) is a three-time Emmy Award winning Brazilian director and executive producer known for her 2009 documentary film Dzi Croquettes, the series "Brutal Pact: The Murder of Daniella Perez" for HBO MAX, "Bateau Mouche, Sinking Justice" (HBO MAX) and "Queens on the Run" for Amazon Prime. Issa has also been nominated to 12 EMMY Awards.

Issa is the co-founder of Producing Partners and Art Docs and the creator, showrunner, producer, and director of numerous primetime television series for American and Brazilian television networks, including HBO, Amazon Studios, Star+, the Food Network, TV Globo and others.

Her series "A Brutal Pact: The Murder of Daniella Perez", became the biggest true crime hit on HBO MAX, hitting the World Top Chart for more than 3 consecutive weeks. Other hit series include "Bateau Mouche, Sinking Justice" (HBO MAX), "Coming Out Stories (Fora do Armário)", a 10-hour documentary series for HBO Latin America, and the acclaimed art series "Geografia da Arte", in conjunction with institutions such as the Keith Haring Foundation, Pina Bausch Foundation, and Donald Judd Foundation.

She is also a member of New York Women in Film & Television (NYWIFT).

== Career ==
Tatiana Issa is a three-time Emmy Award winner executive producer, show-runner & director. She has also been nominated for 12 Emmy Awards (The Television Academy of Arts & Sciences).

She is the co-founder of Producing Partners & ART DOCS with 400+ episodes produced in more than 80 countries and over 40 hit primetime television series and films for channels HBO, HBO Max, Disney+, Amazon Studios, Smithsonian Channel, YouTube Originals, Food Network, Discovery+, TV5 Monde, TV Globo, and Globoplay. Issa is a member of the Television Academy, a juror of the International Emmy Awards and a member of New York Women in Film & Television.

Issa is the CEO and co-founder of Producing Partners as well as ART Docs. She is also the creator, Executive Producer, showrunner, and Director of numerous hit primetime television including "Immersive.World" a new ALL ARTS original series, "Pacto Brutal, the Murder of Daniella Perez" (HBO MAX), "Bateau Mouche, Sinking Justice" (HBO MAX), "Bertha Lutz, Women and the U.N. Charter", a feature documentary for HBO, "Pedro pelo Mundo", a travel and current affairs series shot in over 50 countries, "Destino Con Sabor", a gastronomy/travel series for Food Network.

In 2009, she produced and directed the film Dzi Croquettes, featuring Liza Minnelli, for which she received more than 40 international awards, making it the most awarded documentary in Brazilian history. It has been shown in the Museum of Modern Art (MoMA) in New York, Haus der Kulturen der Welt in Berlin, and in more than 60 countries around the world, followed by a theatrical release in the USA, Europe, and Brazil.

Tatiana has studied internationally with concentrations in language, Cinema & TV, art & literature. She is a polyglot and fluent in 6 languages.

== Personal life ==
Tatiana was born in São Paulo, Brazil, on 16 January 1974. Her father, Americo, was a set designer. She began acting at the age of 7 in plays and international theater festivals. At age 12, she began acting in motion pictures and later attended the Lee Strasberg Institute in New York.

== Reception and awards ==
Reception for Issa's work has been largely positive. Dzi Croquettes, her most famous work, has received praise from multiple news outlets such as the New York Times and Film Journal International.

Tatiana also recently received two Excellence Awards at Impact Doc Awards for her feature documentaries "Yves Saint-Laurent: My Marrakesh" and "The Architecture of Tadao Ando".

Tatiana received 12 Emmy Nominations, she won her first Emmy (64th Television Academy of Arts & Sciences - NY Chapter) as a Director & Executive Producer for her series "Immersive.World." In 2021 she won 2 more Emmys for the documentaries "Dreams from the Deep End" and "Phillip Pearlstein: Life Happen". She got 9 further nominations for her works: "Under the Greenwood Tree", "Transcending - The Chamber Music Society Of Lincoln Center Celebrates 50 Years", "Immersive. World - Immersive Mind" and "Immersive. World - Immersed in a Pandemia" for AllArts & PBS Channels.

Since 2009, Tatiana has received more than 50 awards for her documentaries. She was a Director, Showrunner, Producer or Executive Producer for more than 40 television programs between 2003 and present.

== Filmography ==
As director and producer

- 2024 "Bateau Mouche - O Naufrágio da Justiça" - - HBO MAX - Director/Executive Producer/Showrunner
- 2024 "Um Tanto Familiar" Com Pedro Andrade - HBO MAX - Director/Executive Producer/Showrunner
- 2024 "A Geografia da Arte" 2 Season - ARTE 1 - Creator/ Director / Executive Producer
- 2023 "Caravana das Drags" - Amazon Prime - Creator/ Executive Producer/ Showrunner
- 2023 "Pacto Brutal, O Assassinato de Daniella Perez" - HBO MAX - Director/Executive Producer/Showrunner
- 2023 "Coisa de Menino" - HBO Max - Director/ Executive Producer/ Showrunner
- 2023 "Do Amor e de Luta" - GNT / Globoplay - Director/ Executive Producer/ Showrunner
- 2021 "Mulheres que Mudam o Mundo" - Youtube Originals - Director/ Executive Producer/ Showrunner
- 2021 "Ludmilla, Rainha da Favela" - Globoplay - Director/ Executive Producer/ Showrunner
- 2020 "Modo Mãe, Com Ingrid Guimarães" - GNT Network - Director/ Executive Producer/ Showrunner
- 2020 "Bertha Lutz - Women and the U.N. Charter" - HBO Channel - Director/Executive Producer
- 2019 "Vai que Cola, Miami" - Executive Producer - Multishow Channel
- 2019 "Além da Conta" - GNT / Globoplay - Director/Executive Producer/Showrunner
- 2019 "Tem Wi-fi" - Season 6 - Director/Executive Producer - GNT Network
- 2019 "Anota Aí, Listas imperdíveis" - Seasons 6 & 7 - Director/Executive Producer – Multishow Network
- 2019 "Férias em Família" - Season 1 - Executive Producer - Multishow Network
- 2019 "Expresso Futuro com Ronaldo Lemos" - Season 3 - Director/Executive Producer - TV Globo Network
- 2019 "Pedro Pelo Mundo" - Season 4 - Director/Executive Producer – GNT Network
- 2019 "Viver do Riso" - Director/Executive Producer - TV Globo Network
- 2018 "Fora do Armário" - Director/Executive Producer - HBO Channel
- 2018 "Os Gretchens" - Director/Executive Producer –Multishow Network
- 2018 "Expresso Futuro com Ronaldo Lemos" - Season 2 - Director/Executive Producer - Canal Futura
- 2018 "Pedro Pelo Mundo" - Season 3 - Director/Executive Producer – GNT Network
- 2018 "Anota Aí, Listas imperdíveis" - Seasons 4 & 5 - Director/Executive Producer – Multishow Network [1]
- 2018 "Além da Conta, com Ingrid Guimarães" - Season 5 - Director/Executive Producer – GNT Network
- 2017 "Expresso Futuro com Ronaldo Lemos" - Director/Executive Producer - Canal Futura
- 2017 "Geografia da Arte" - Director/Executive Producer - ARTE1 Channel
- 2017 "Destino Con Sabor" - Director/Executive Producer - Food Network
- 2017 "Pedro Pelo Mundo" - Season 2 - Director/Executive Producer – GNT Network
- 2016 "Além da Conta, com Ingrid Guimarães" - Season 3 & 4 - Director/Executive Producer – GNT Network
- 2016 "Pedro Pelo Mundo" - Director/Executive Producer – GNT Network
- 2015 "Almanaque Musical, com Marisa Orth" - Seasons 2 & 3 - Director/Executive Producer – Canal Brasil Network [2]
- 2015 "Anota Aí, Listas imperdíveis" - Seasons 2 & 3 - Director/Executive Producer – Multishow Network [1]
- 2014 "Rebobina" - Director/Executive Producer - Canal VIVA / Globosat Network
- 2014 "Beyond Ipanema" - Season 2 - Executive Producer - Canal Brasil Network [3]
- 2014 "NELSON 70, com Nelson Motta" - Director/Executive Producer – Canal Brasil Network [4]
- 2014 "Almanaque Musical, com Marisa Orth" - Director/Executive Producer – Canal Brasil Network [2]
- 2014 "Além da Conta, com Ingrid Guimarães" - Director/Executive Producer – GNT Network [5][6]
- 2014 "Anota Aí, Listas imperdíveis" - Director/Executive Producer –Multishow Network [1]
- 2013 "Gaby Gringa" - Director/Executive Producer – BIS Network [7][8]
- 2013 "Agenor, Canções de Cazuza" - Director/Executive Producer - BIS Network [9][10]
- 2012 "Beyond Ipanema"- Executive Producer - Canal Brasil Network [3]
- 2011 "Mundo em Movimento" - Director/Executive Producer –Multishow Network [11]
- 2010 "Broadway Dreams"- Director/Executive Producer –Multishow Network [12]
- 2003/2005 "New York Underground" - Director/Executive Producer /Hostess – Band & CNT Networks
- 2005 Medusa
- 2006 Parintins: Amor de Boi
- 2007 Dzi Croquettes

=== Education ===
- 2005 The Goethe-Institut Munich, Germany- Art History/ German Language
- 2003 Cervantes Institute New York, USA – Spanish Language
- 2001 Lorenzo de' Medici School Florence, Italy – Italian Language/ Literature/ Art History
- 2000 La Sorbonne Paris, France – French Language/ Art History/ Literature
- 2000 École du Louvre Paris, France – Art History
- 1998 Lee Strasberg Theatre and Film Institute New York, USA – Acting techniques for film and TV/ scene study
- 1996 The Eurocentre Cambridge Cambridge, England – English Language
- 1988 The Tablado Institute Rio de Janeiro, Brazil – Scene study
