= Hermeto Pascoal =

Brazilian jazz musician (1936–2025)

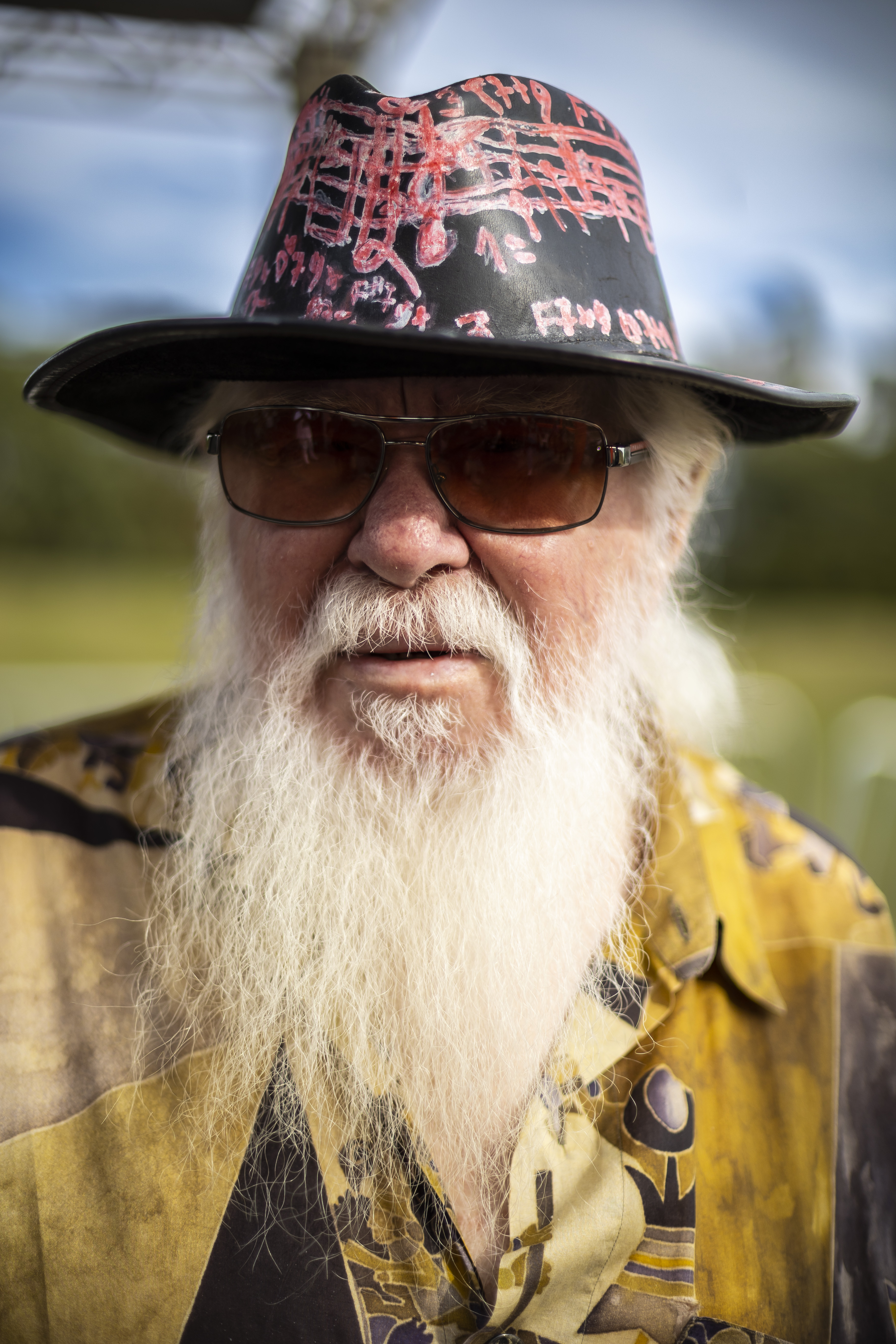
- Hermeto Pascoal in 2023

Background information
- Born: Hermeto Pascoal Oliveira da Costa; 22 June 1936; Olho d'Água das Flores, Alagoas, Brazil
- Died: 13 September 2025 (aged 89) Rio de Janeiro, Brazil
- Genres: Jazz; avant-jazz; avant garde; forró; samba
- Occupations: Musician, composer
- Instruments: Vocals; keyboards; melodica; accordion; flute; saxophone; guitar
- Years active: 1956–2025
- Label: Far Out
- Website: Official website

Hermeto Pascoal Oliveira da Costa best known as Hermeto Pascoal (22 June 1936 – 13 September 2025) was a Brazilian composer and multi-instrumentalist. Pascoal was best known in Brazilian music for his orchestration and improvisation, as well as for being a record producer and contributor to many Brazilian and international albums.

== Life and career ==
=== Early life and career ===
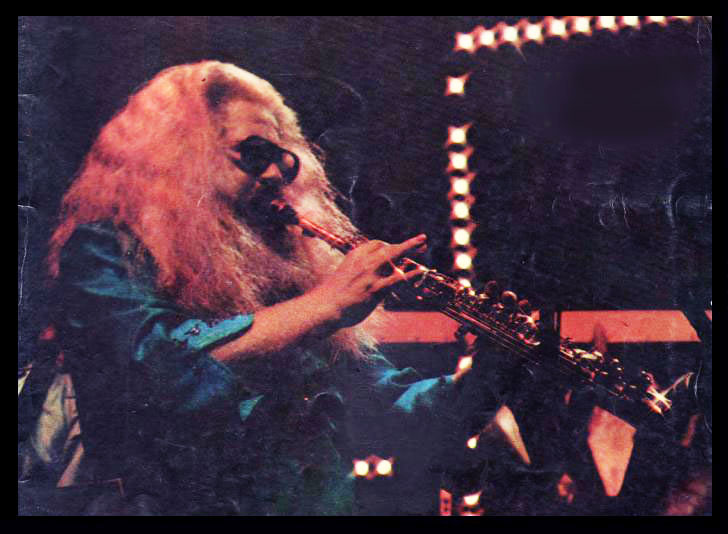
Pascoal live in Buenos Aires 1978

Pascoal was born on 22 June 1936 in Olho d'Água das Flores in Northeastern Brazil, in an area that lacked electricity at the time he was born. He learned the accordion from his father and practiced for hours indoors, as, being born with albinism, he was incapable of working in the countryside with the rest of his family. As a child, Pascoal idolised baião accordionist Luiz Gonzaga, and he inspired both Pascoal and his brother, José Neto, to pursue music.

From an early age, Pascoal played the button accordion. At age seven, he started with the flute. Pascoal was a self-taught child prodigy, not only learning the accordion but also learning scat singing and being good at whistling, being able to do birdcalls. When he was eleven, he started performing in musical groups with his brother and father. He and his family moved between Recife and Caruaru several times. Pascoal starting playing in some groups there that would start getting radio time. With his brother and Sivuca, who both also had albinism, he formed an accordion trio called O Mundo em Chamas for a short time.

Pascoal taught himself piano, woodwind and percussion instruments. At the end of the 1950s, Pascoal had moved to the south of the country and eked out a living as a musician in Rio and São Paulo. In 1960, he picked up the saxophone and created the group Som Quatro.

In 1964, he played in the Sambrasa Trio, with Airto Moreira and Humberto Clayber. They released only one album, Em Som Maior. Then he joined Trio Novo (Airto Moreira, Heraldo do Monte, Theo de Barros) and in 1967 the group, renamed Quarteto Novo, released an album that launched the careers of Pascoal and Moreira. Pascoal would then go on to join the multi-faceted group Brazilian Octopus. In 1969, at the invitation of Flora Purim and Airto Moreira, he traveled to the United States and recorded two LPs with them on Buddah Records, serving as composer, arranger, and instrumentalist: Pascoal also managed to record his debut album in 1970 for Cobblestone Records with the help of Airto Moreira, Flora Purim, Joe Farrell and Googie Coppola.

=== International fame ===
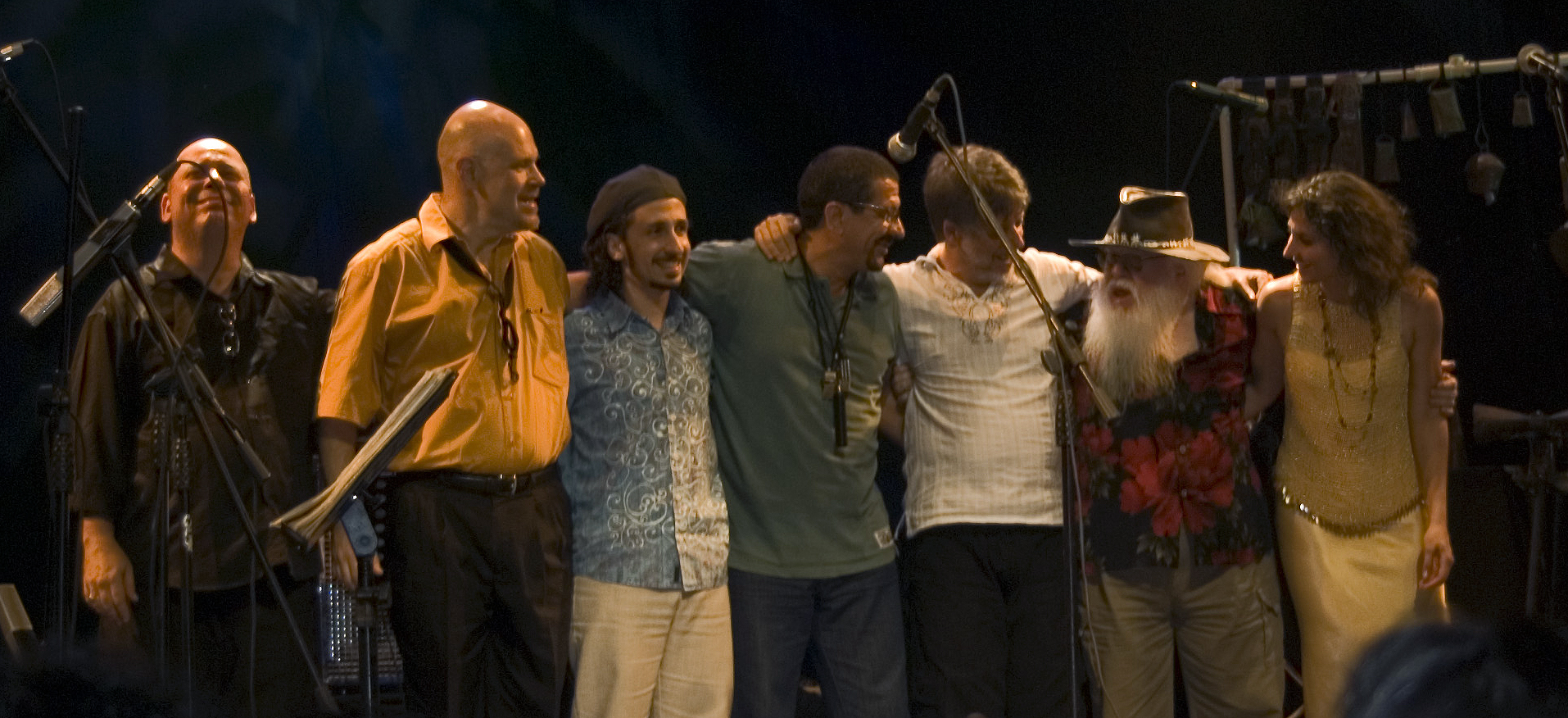
Hermeto Pascoal and group, 2009

Pascoal initially caught the international public's attention with an appearance on Miles Davis's 1971 album Live-Evil, which featured him on three pieces, which he also composed. Davis allegedly called Pascoal "the most impressive musician in the world". Later collaborations involved fellow Brazilian musicians Airto Moreira and Flora Purim. From the late 1970s onward, he has mostly led his own groups, playing at many prestigious venues, such as the Montreux Jazz Festival in 1979. Other members of the group have included bassist Itibere Zwarg, pianist Jovino Santos-Neto and percussionists Nene, Pernambuco, and Zabelê.

Between 1996 and 1997, Pascoal worked on a book project called Calendário do Som, which contains a song for every day of the year, including 29 February, so that everyone would have a song for their birthday.

He later returned to the Jabour neighborhood in Bangu, Rio de Janeiro, where he spent much of his time composing, rehearsing and hosting musicians from all over the world.

In 2019, his album Hermeto Pascoal e Sua Visão Original do Forró won the Latin Grammy Award for Best Portuguese Language Roots Album.

=== Personal life ===
Pascoal was married to Ilza da Silva, to whom he dedicated many compositions, from 1954 until her death in 2000. They had six children, Jorge, Fábio, Flávia, Fátima, Fabiula, and Flávio, and many grandchildren. Hermeto was later married to Aline Morena from 2003 until 2016, while living in Curitiba, Paraná, Brazil.

Pascoal died from multiple organ failure in Rio de Janeiro, on 13 September 2025, at the age of 89.

== Music ==
Pascoal was a multi-instrumentalist who would switch between instruments in performance. Known as o Bruxo (the Sorcerer), he often made music with unconventional objects such as teapots, children's toys, and animals, as well as keyboards, button accordions, melodica, saxophones, guitars, flutes, voices, various brass and folkloric instruments. He used nature as a basis for his compositions, as in his Música da Lagoa, in which the musicians burble water and play glass bottles and flutes while immersed in a lagoon: a Brazilian television broadcast from 1999 showed him soloing at one point by singing into a cup with his mouth partially submerged in water. Folk music from rural Brazil is another important influence in his work.

== Discography ==
- Conjunto Som 4 (Continental, 1964), with Conjunto Som 4
- Em Som Maior (Som Maior, 1966), with Sambrasa Trio
- Quarteto Novo (EMI, 1967), with Quarteto Novo
- Brazilian Octopus (Som Livre/Fermata, 1970), with Brazilian Octopus
- Hermeto Pascoal (Buddah, 1970, Muse, 1988)
- A música livre de Hermeto Pascoal (Polygram, 1973)
- Slaves Mass (Warner, 1977)
- Zabumbê-bum-á (Warner Brazil, 1979)
- Ao vivo Montreux (Warner Brazil, 1979)
- Nova história da Música Popular Brasileira (compilation) (1979)
- Cérebro magnético (Warner Brazil, 1980)
- Planetário da Gávea (1981)
- Hermeto Pascoal & Grupo (Som da Gente, 1982)
- Lagoa da Canoa, Município de Arapiraca (Som da Gente, 1984)
- Brasil Universo (Som da Gente, 1985)
- Só não toca quem não quer (Som da Gente, 1987)
- Hermeto solo: por diferentes caminhos (Som da Gente, 1988)
- A Musica Livre de Hermeto Paschoal [sic] (Verve, 1990)
- Festa dos deuses (Polygram 1992)
- Instrumental no CCBB (1993), with Renato Borghetti
- Brasil Musical (Tom Brasil Produções Musicais, 1993), with Pau Brasil
- Eu e eles (Radio MEC, 1999)
- Mundo verde esperança (Radio MEC, 2002)
- Chimarrão com rapadura (self released, 2006), with Aline Morena
- Bodas de Latão (Tratore, 2010), with Aline Morena
- Hermeto Pascoal: The Monash Sessions (Jazzhead, 2013), with the Sir Zelman Cowen School of Music
- No Mundo dos Sons (SESC-SP, 2017)
- Viajando com o som (Far Out, 2017, recorded in 1976)
- Natureza Universal (self-released, 2017)
- Made of Music (Budweiser 2018)
- E sua visão original do forró (2018, recorded 1999)
- Pra Você, Ilza (Rocinante, 2024)
- Sinfonia em Quadrinhos (2026)

=== As contributor ===
- Ritmos Alucinantes (1956), by Clovis Pereira
- Batucando no Morro (Tiger, 1958–1960), by Pernambuco do Pandeiro e seu regional
- Caminho (RCA, 1965), by Walter Santos
- Tide (A&M, 1970), with Tom Jobim
- Natural Feelings (Buddha, 1970), by Airto Moreira
- Electric Byrd (Blue Note 1970), by Donald Byrd
- Sergio Mendes Presents Lobo (A&M, 1970), by Edu Lobo
- It Could Only Happen with You (Blue Note 1970), by Duke Pearson
- Live-Evil (Columbia, 1971), by Miles Davis
- Cantiga de Longe (Elenco, 1970), by Edu Lobo
- Seeds on the Ground (Buddha, 1971), by Airto Moreira
- Di Melo, by Di Melo (Odeon, 1975)
- Imyra, Tayra, Ipy (Odeon, 1976), by Taiguara
- Open Your Eyes You Can Fly (Milestone, 1976), by Flora Purim
- Goldenwings (Milestone, 1976), by Opa
- Stone Alliance (PM, 1977), by Márcio Montarroyos
- Orós (CBS/Columbia, 1977), by Raimundo Fagner
- Robertinho no passo (CBS, 1978), by Robertinho de Recife
- Sivuca (Copacabana, 1979), by Sivuca
- Live in Montreux (Elektra, 1982), by Elis Regina
- Cordas vivas (Som Da Gente, 1983) by Heraldo do Monte
- Ponto do músicos (Maracatu, 1984) by Nenê
- Balãozinho (Continental, 1986), by Eduardo Gudin
- Cordas mágicas (Som da Gente, 1986), by Heraldo do Monte
- Pindorama (Copacabana, 1979), by Pau Brasil
- Dharana (Natale Produções Artísticas, 1987), by Dharana
- Oferenda (self-released, 1996), by Aleuda
- Marítimo (Sony, 1998) by Adriana Calcanhotto (on track "Canção por Acaso")
- Nação Nordestina (BMG, 2000), by Zé Ramalho (on track "Violando com Hermeto")
- Serenata: The Music of Hermeto Pascoal (Adventure Music, 2003), by Mike Marshall and Jovino Santos Neto
- Roda Carioca (Adventure Music, 2006), by Jovino Santos Neto
- Beams (self-released, 2023), by Dan Costa

== Bibliography ==
- Calendário do Som (Senac, 2000, ISBN 8573591358, OCLC 52331774)

== Sources ==
- McGowan, Chris; Pessanha, Ricardo (1991). "Hermeto Pascoal". The Brazilian Sound: samba, bossa nova, and the popular music of Brazil. New York: Billboard Books. pp. 158–161. ISBN 0-8230-7673-3.
- Neto, Luiz Costa-Lima (2011). "The Musical Universe of Hermeto Pascoal". Popular Music and Society. 34 (2): 133–161. doi:10.1080/03007760903214803. ISSN 0300-7766.
- Neto, Luiz Costa-Lima (2015). The Experimental Music of Hermeto Pascoal and Group (1981–1993): Conception and Language. Lives in Music Series No. 13. Translated by Coimbra, Laura; Moore, Stephen Thomas. Hillsdale, New York: Pendragon Press. ISBN 978-1576472248. OCLC 1037874842.
