= O Morro Não Tem Vez =

1962 bossa nova song

Song
- Language: Portuguese
- English title: The Slums aren't Given a Chance
- Genre: Bossa nova
- Composer(s): Antônio Carlos Jobim
- Lyricist(s): Vinicius de Moraes, Ray Gilbert

"O Morro Não Tem Vez" (loosely translated as "The Slums aren't Given a Chance"), also known as "Favela", "O Morro", and "Somewhere in the Hills", is a bossa nova jazz standard composed by Antônio Carlos Jobim with lyrics written by Vinicius de Moraes. The English lyrics were written by Ray Gilbert.

The song was first released in 1962 by Pedrinho Rodrigues as an a-side to "O Amor e a Canção". In 1963, it was popularized by Jair Rodrigues. The most famous versions are by Astrud Gilberto, Antônio Carlos Jobim, and Stan Getz.

== Context ==
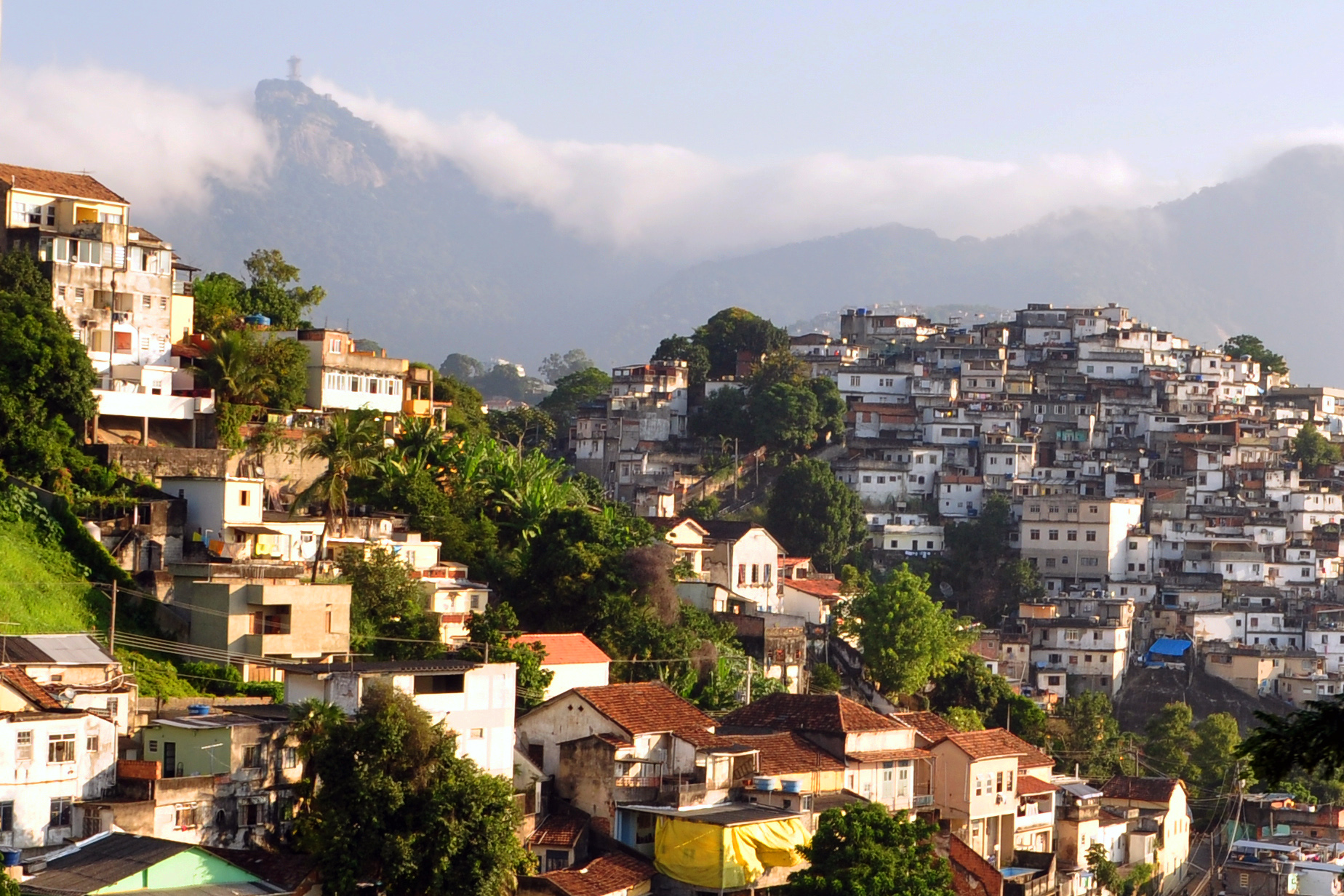
Favelas of Rio de Janeiro

In 1964, not shortly after the song was released, the Brazilian government suffered a coup and was replaced by a military dictatorship. During this time, many musicians and composers, including songwriters Jobim and de Moraes, were arrested and interrogated by the police or had their telephones and mail tapped for creating "subversive" music. While bossa nova has not usually been regarded as having political themes, the song became one of the genre's only protest songs due to its subject surrounding the favelas.

The phrase "o morro não tem vez" has since been used in opposition of economic injustice in Brazil.

== Notable recordings ==
- Pedrinho Rodrigues - O Morro Não Tem Vez / O Amor e a Canção (1962)
- Jair Rodrigues - O Samba Como Ele É (1963)
- Antônio Carlos Jobim - The Composer of Desafinado Plays (1963)
- Stan Getz & Luiz Bonfá - Jazz Samba Encore! (1963)
- Sambalanço Trio - Sambalanço Trio (1964)
- Astrud Gilberto - The Astrud Gilberto Album (1965)
- Antônio Carlos Jobim - The Wonderful World of Antônio Carlos Jobim (1965)
- Elis Regina - 2 Na Bossa (1965)
- Sérgio Mendes Trio - The Swinger From Rio (1966)
- Vince Guaraldi & Bola Sete - Live at El Matador (1966)
- Charlie Byrd - Sugarloaf Suite (1980)
- Ella Fitzgerald - Ella Abraça Jobim (1981)
- Tim Maia - Só Você (Para Ouvir e Dançar) (1997)
