= Zimbo Trio =

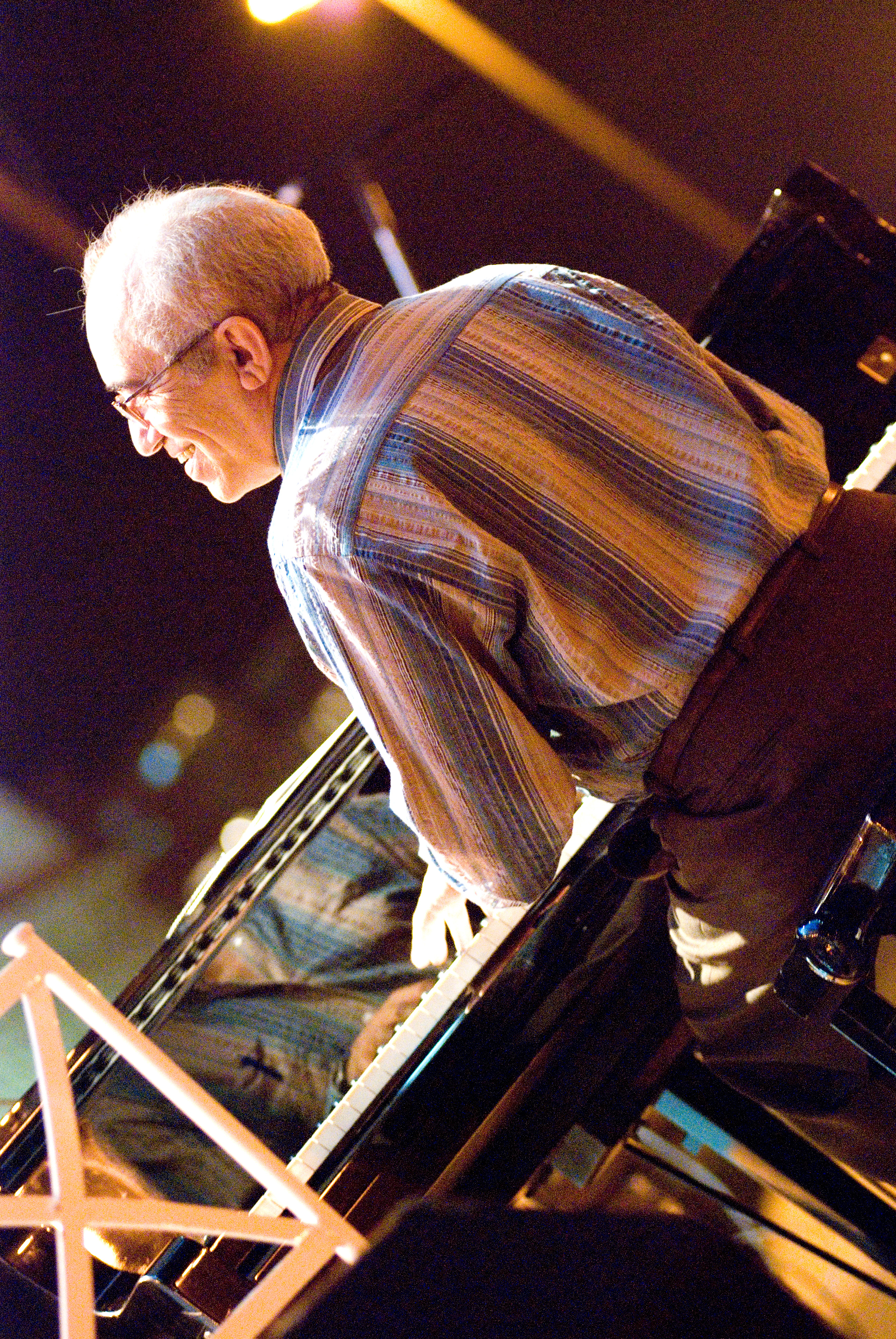
- From left to right: Amilton, Mario, Pércio and Rubinho

Background information
- Origin: São Paulo, São Paulo, Brazil
- Genres: MPB, jazz, bossa nova
- Years active: 1964–present
- Members: Amilton Godoy; Rubinho Barsotti; Pércio Sápia; Mario Andreotti
- Past members: Luíz Chaves; Itamar Collaço
- Website: www.zimbotrio.com.br

The Zimbo Trio is a Brazilian instrumental ensemble, established in 1964 in São Paulo, and originally comprising Amilton Godoy (piano), Luís Chaves (bass) and Rubinho Barsotti (drums). The Trio was one of the most influential groups of Brazilian music in the second half of the 20th century.

== History ==
The Zimbo Trio is a Brazilian instrumental trio, founded in March 1964, São Paulo, by Luiz Chaves Oliveira da Paz "Luiz Chaves" (bass), Rubens Alberto Barsotti "Rubens"(drums) and Amilton Godoy (piano). The first presentation took place at “Boate Oásis” on March 17, featuring the singer Norma Bengell. One of the songs played was "Consolação" by Baden Powell and Vinicius de Moraes.

In 1965, the Zimbo Trio became the fixed band of the TV Show “O Fino da Bossa”, TV Record, presented by Elis Regina and Jair Rodrigues. They released album "O fino do Fino" with Elis Regina.

In 1968, the Zimbo Trio attended an anthological concert at Teatro João Caetano which gathered Elizeth Cardoso, Jacob do Bandolim and Época de Ouro.

In 2007, bassist Luiz Chaves, a founder of the Zimbo Trio, died. Itamar Collaço (electric bass) was in charge of carrying on Luiz’s legacy.

In 2010 Mario Andreotti replaced Itamar.

Currently, the Zimbo Trio is formed by Amilton Godoy (piano), Mario Andreotti (bass) and Percio Sapia (drums) who shares the stage with his master Rubens Barsotti, who is recovering from surgery. In a new phase, the trio has a repertoire of Amilton's compositions.

Over a 45-year career and 51 albums recorded, the Zimbo Trio has gained worldwide recognition, toured the world, and spread Brazilian instrumental music.

== Discography ==
- Zimbo Trio (1965) RGE LP
- O fino do Fino – Elis Regina and Zimbo Trio (1965), Philips LP, CD
- Zimbo Trio-vol. II (1966) RGE LP
- Zimbo Trio-vol. III (1967) LP
- É tempo de samba - Zimbo Trio + Strings (1968) LP
- Live in João Caetano Theater-vol. I – Elizeth Cardoso, Zimbo Trio, Jacob do Bandolim and Época de Ouro (1968) Museum of Image and Sound LP, CD
- Live in João Caetano Theater-vol. II - Elizeth Cardoso, Zimbo Trio, Jacob do Bandolim and Época de Ouro (1968) Museum of Image and Sound LP, CD
- The Zimbo Trio - The Brazilian Sound Restrained Excitement (1968) Pacific Jazz/Liberty Records LP
- Zimbo Trio + Strings-vol. II (1969) LP
- Decisão-Zimbo Trio + Metals (1969) RGE LP
- Elizeth & Zimbo Trio - Balançam na Sucata (1969) Copacabana LP, CD
- É de manhã. Elizeth Cardoso & Zimbo Trio (1970) Copacabana LP
- Strings and brass plays the hits (1971) Phonogram LP
- Opus pop - Zimbo Trio & orchestra - Classics with bossa (1972) Phonogram LP
- Opus pop nº 2 (1973) Phonogram LP
- FM Stereo (1974) Phonogram LP
- Zimbo (1976) RGE LP
- Unpublished fragments of the historical recital in João Caetano Theater, Feb. 19, 1968 - Elizeth Cardoso, Jacob do Bandolim, Zimbo Trio & Época de ouro-vol. 3 (1977) Museum of Image and Sound LP, CD
- Zimbo (1978) CLAM/Continental LP
- Zimbo invites Sonny Stitt (1979) Clam/Continental LP
- Zimbo invites Sebastião Tapajós (1982) Clam LP
- Zimbo invites (1982) Clam LP
- Changing Jeca's sadness into kids (1983) Clam/Continental LP
- Zimbo Trio interprets Milton Nascimento (1986) Clam/Continental LP
- Zimbo Trio and Tom – Vol. I (1988) Clam LP
- Zimbo Trio and the children (1989) Clam LP
- Clã do Clam (1992) CD
- Instrumental in CCBB – Canhoto da Paraíba & Zimbo Trio (1993) Tom Brasil CD
- Aquarela do Brasil (1993) Movieplay CD
- Between Friends (Entre amigos) - Claudya & Zimbo Trio (1994) Movieplay CD
- Elizeth Cardoso, Jacob do Bandolim, Zimbo Trio & Época de Ouro - Live in João Caetano Theater - Feb. 19 '68 (1994) Tartaruga (Japan) CD
- Caminhos cruzados (Crossroads) - Zimbo Trio interprets Tom Jobim (1995) Movieplay CD
- Brasil musical - Música Viva series - Zimbo Trio & Maurício Einhorn (1996) Tom Brasil CD
- Zimbo Trio (1997) RGE CD
- 35 Years (1999) Movieplay CD
- This century's Brazilian music by its authors & performers - Zimbo Trio (2001) Sesc-SP CD

== See also ==
- Walter Wanderley
