= César Camargo Mariano =

Brazilian pianist, arranger, and composer

César Camargo Mariano (born 19 September 1943) is a Brazilian pianist, arranger, composer and music producer.

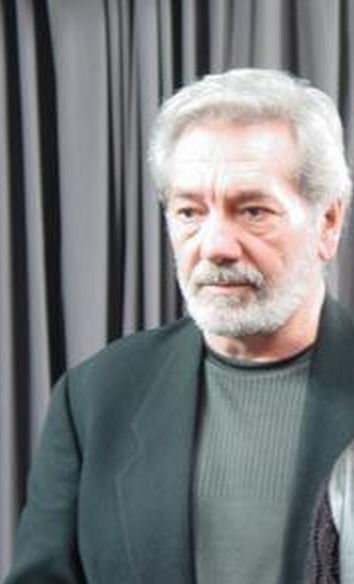
César Camargo Mariano

== Biography ==
Mariano was born in São Paulo. In June 1957 the American trombone player Melba Liston invited thirteen-year-old Mariano to participate in her concert at a jazz club in Rio de Janeiro, and he appeared in a program on Rio's Globo Radio called "The Boy Prodigy Who Plays Jazz".

Thar same year, Mariano met Johnny Alf, who went to live with Mariano's family due to their great friendship. Together at the family home in São Paulo, Mariano became familiar with arranging, composing, and the arts of cinema and theatre, thanks to Johnny Alf's encouragement.

Through his own instincts, tenacity and raw talent, Mariano formed amateur instrumental and vocal groups, when TV Record in São Paulo invited him for a special called "Passport to Stardom" (Passaporte para o Estrelato).

In the early 1960s, a teenaged Mariano became famous for his ability to swing and for his legendary left hand. His ensembles of that era, notably Sambalanço Trio and Som Três, are regarded today as high points in Brazilian jazz; so for his 1981 album Samambaia, one of his thirty-plus instrumental albums.

Mariano's collaborations with some of Brazil's most important singers like Wilson Simonal and Elis Regina, brought him global acclaim, such as the historic 1973 album Elis e Tom, recorded with Antônio Carlos Jobim, that featured Mariano as producer, pianist, and musical director.

Since then, Mariano had worked with an international array of musical giants, from Yo-Yo Ma, to Blossom Dearie. He also composed a wealth of soundtrack music for film and TV.

In April 1994, Mariano moved to the United States, where he lives with his wife until now. Mariano received the 2006 Latin Recording Academy Lifetime Achievement Grammy Award.

From his first marriage to singer Marisa Vertullo Brandão, a.k.a. Gata Mansa, he had a son Marcelo Mariano, today an accomplished bass player. He was married to Brazilian superstar Elis Regina for 8 years and they had two children (Pedro Mariano and Maria Rita); today they are both established singers.

From his third marriage of 30 years to Flavia Rodrigues Alves he has a daughter, Luisa Mariano (1986), a singer, vocal producer, music business professional and graduate from Berklee College of Music, who worked at Sony Music, Buddah Brown Entertainment, and currently works freelance as Tour Manager and Vocal Producer.

== Discography ==
- Quarteto Sabá (1964) RGE
- Sambalanço Trio (1964) RGE
- Sambalanço Trio II (1965) RGE
- Lennie Dale e o Sambalanço Trio (1965) Elenco
- Raulzinho e o Sambalanço Trio (1965) RCA
- Reencontro com Sambalanço Trio (1965) RGE
- Octeto de César Camargo Mariano (1966) RGE
- Som Três (1966) RGE
- Som Três Show (1968)
- Som Três Vol. II (1969) RGE
- Som Três Vol. III - Um é Pouco, Dois é Bom (1970)
- Som Três Vol. IV - Tobogã (1971) Odeon Brazil
- São Paulo - Brasil (1978) RCA Brazil
- César Camargo Mariano & Cia. (1980)
- Samambaia (1981) EMI/Odeon Brazil
- A Todas As Amizades (1983) Columbia Brazil
- Todas As Teclas (1984) Ariola - with Wagner Tiso
- Voz e Suor (1983) EMI/Odeon - with Nana Caymmi
- Prisma (1985) Pointer Brazil - with Nelson Ayres
- Mitos (1988) Sony Brazil
- Ponte das Estrelas (1988) Sony Brazil
- César Camargo Mariano (1989) Chorus Brazil
- Natural (1993) Polygram
- Nós (1994) Velas - with Leny Andrade
- Solo Brasileiro (1994) Polygram Brazil
- Piano Voz y Sentimiento (1997) Polygram Mexico
- Duo: Romero Lubambo e César Camargo Mariano (2002) Trama Brazil
- Nova Saudade (2002) Rob Digital Brazil
- Piano & Voz: César Camargo Mariano e Pedro Mariano (2003) Trama Brazil
- Ao Vivo with Leny Andrade (2007)

== Awards ==
=== CLIO awards ===
International radio

- Winner: Music/lyrics
- Chevrolet Line - "The World Out There"
- Music Director
- Music Composer

International radio

- Winner: Overall campaign
- Chevrolet Line - "The World Out There"
- Music Director
- Music Composer

International TV/cinema

- Recognition: Music
- GM Cars - "See The Country"
- Music composer

International radio

- Recognition: Beverages
- Coca-Cola - "There Are Times...."
- Music composer

International radio

- Recognition: Music/lyrics
- Chevrolet Line - "Come On"
- Music composer

International radio

- Recognition: Beverages
- Coca-Cola - "It Doesn't Matter..."
- Personalities

International radio

- Recognition: Overall campaign
- Coca-Cola - "There Are Times...", "It Doesn't Matter"
- Music composer

International radio

- Recognition; Automotive
- Chevrolet Line - "Come On"
- Music composer

International radio

- Recognition; Music scoring
- Hilton cigarettes - "Hilton"
- Music arrangement

International radio

- Recognition: Automotive
- Chevrolet Line - "It's For Real Samba"
- Composer
- Music Director

International radio

- Recognition: Automotive
- Chevrolet Line - "It's For Real Funk"
- Composer

=== Latin Grammy awards ===
- 2004 Best MPB Album: Piano & Voz (nominated)
- 2006 Latin Grammy Lifetime Achievement Award
- 2007 Best MPB Album: Ao Vivo (with Leny Andrade)
- 2017 Best Instrumental Album: Joined (with Rudiger) (nominated)

=== Sharp Music award ===
- Second Sharp Music Award
- Best Arranger "Samba"
- Fifth Sharp Music award
- Best Arranger: "Instrumental"
- Seventh Sharp Music Award
- Best Arranger: "Instrumental"

=== Playboy award ===
- V Playboy award
- Best Arranger

=== TIM Music Award ===
- First Brazilian TIM Music Award
- Best Instrumental Album: "Duo"

=== APCA Awards ===
- 1972 Best Arranger
- 1974 Best Arranger
- 1976 Special Highlight
- 1978 Best Arranger
- 1979 Best Arranger
- 1980 Best Pianist
- 1979 Best Arranger
- 1982 Best Arranger and Best Pianist
- 1983 Best Arranger and Best Pianist
- 1984 Best Arranger and Best Pianist
