= Airto Moreira =

Brazilian drummer and percussionist (born 1941)

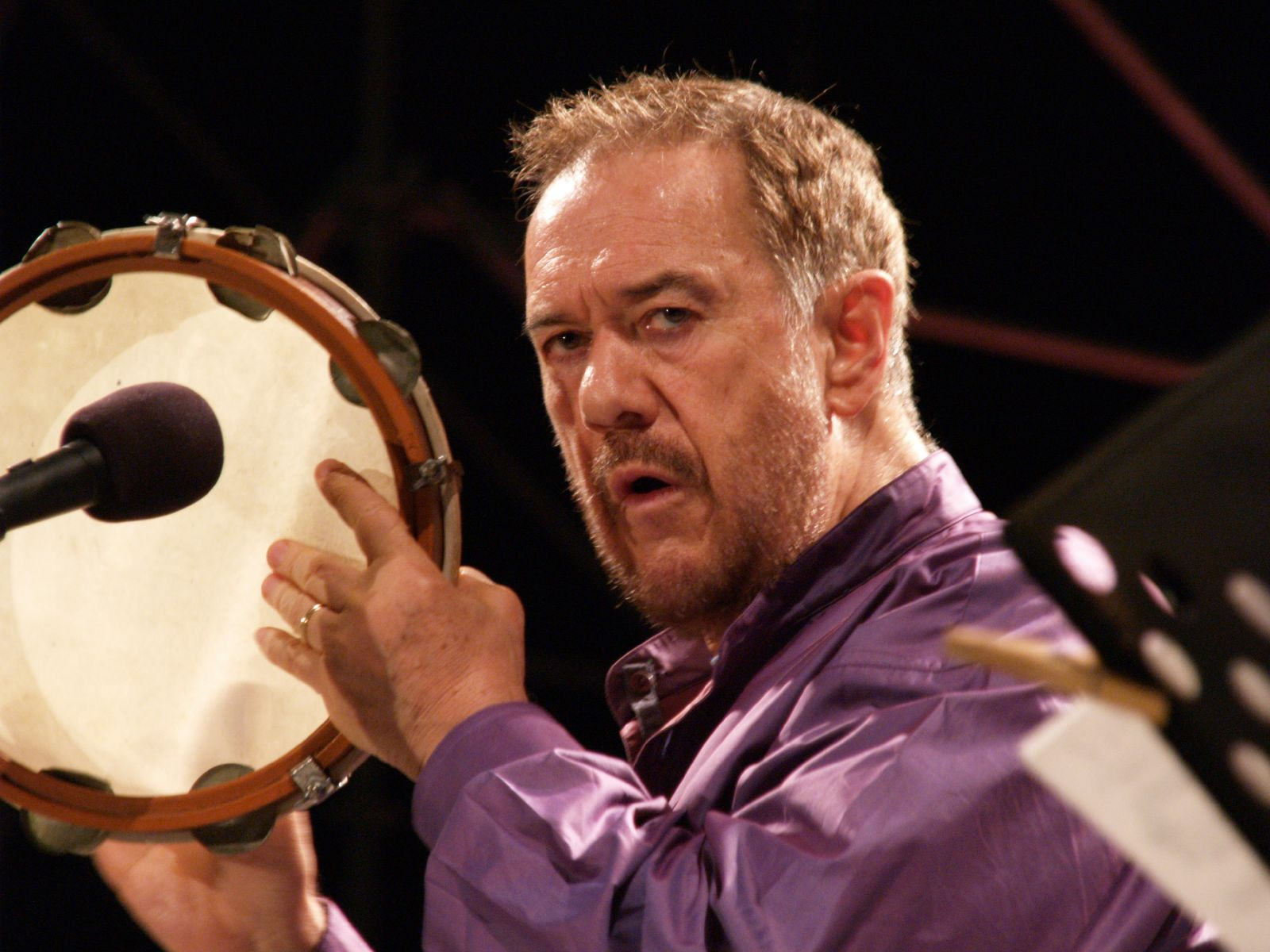
- Moreira in concert in 2007

Background information
- Born: Airto Guimorvan Moreira; August 5, 1941 (age 85); Itaiópolis, Santa Catarina, Brazil
- Genres: Jazz, jazz fusion, Brazilian jazz, pop, baião
- Occupations: Musician, bandleader, composer
- Instruments: Drums, percussion
- Years active: 1954–present
- Labels: One Way, CTI, Arista, Warner Music Japan

Airto Guimorvan Moreira (born August 5, 1941) is a Brazilian jazz drummer, composer and percussionist. He is married to jazz singer Flora Purim, and their daughter Diana Moreira is also a singer. Coming to prominence in the late 1960s as a member of the Brazilian ensemble Quarteto Novo, he moved to the United States and worked in jazz fusion with Miles Davis, Return to Forever, Weather Report and Santana.

== Biography ==
Airto Moreira at Paul Masson Harvest Jazz Festival, Saratoga CA 10/3/81

Airto Moreira was born in Itaiópolis, Brazil, into a family of folk healers, and raised in Curitiba and São Paulo. Showing an extraordinary talent for music at a young age, he became a professional musician at age 13, noticed first as a member of the samba jazz pioneers Sambalanço Trio and for his landmark recording with Hermeto Pascoal in Quarteto Novo in 1967. Shortly after, he followed his wife Flora Purim to the United States.

After moving to the US, Moreira studied with Moacir Santos in Los Angeles. He then moved to New York where he began playing regularly with jazz musicians, including the bassist Walter Booker. Through Booker, Moreira began playing with Joe Zawinul, who in turn introduced him to Miles Davis. At this time Davis was experimenting with electronic instruments and rock and funk rhythms, a form which was soon called jazz fusion. Moreira participated in several of the most important projects of this emerging musical form, and stayed with Davis for about two years.

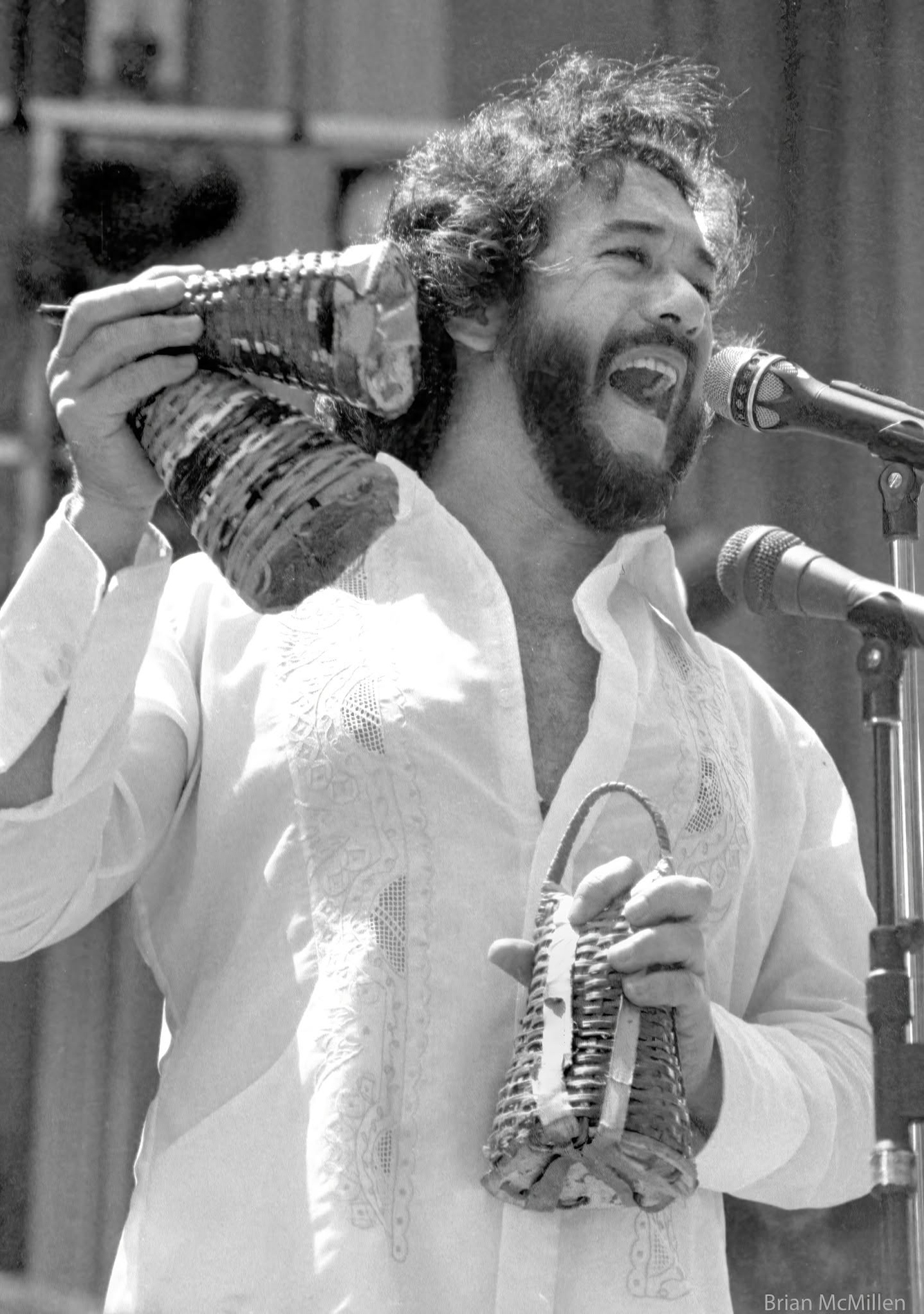
Airto Moreira at UC Berkeley Greek Theater, Berkeley Jazz Festival 1982

Shortly after leaving Davis, Moreira joined other Davis alumni Zawinul, Wayne Shorter and Miroslav Vitous in their group Weather Report, playing percussion on their first album (1971). He left Weather Report (replaced by Dom Um Romão and Muruga Booker for their Sweetnighter album) to join fellow Davis alumnus Chick Corea's new band Return to Forever. He played drums on Return to Forever's first two albums: Return to Forever and Light as a Feather in 1972.

Moreira was a contributor to many of Grateful Dead percussionist Mickey Hart's world music/percussion albums in Rykodisc's The World collection, including The Apocalypse Now Sessions, Däfos, Supralingua, and Planet Drum, which won a World Music Grammy in 1991. He can be heard playing congas on Eumir Deodato's 1970s space-funk hit "Also sprach Zarathustra" on the album Prelude.

Moreira has also played with several jazz musicians, including Cannonball Adderley, Lee Morgan, Paul Desmond, Dave Holland, Jack DeJohnette, John McLaughlin, Keith Jarrett, Al Di Meola, Zakir Hussain, George Duke and Mickey Hart.

In addition to jazz concerts and recordings, he has composed and contributed music to film and television, played at the re-opening of the Library of Alexandria, Egypt (along with fellow professor of ethnomusicology Halim El-Dabh), and taught at UCLA and the California Brazil Camp. He also produced albums for a number of artists and labels including the 1970 self titled album by Hermeto Pascoal Other artists Airto produced include Raul De Souza, Cal Tjader and Flora Purim.

In April 22nd, 1976 issue of Down Beat - in its 1776-1976 Column It Happened the magazine chose Airto's addition of Little Instruments "to the electro-futuristic ensemeble" Miles Davis at Fillmore to represent the important jazz event for that year.

In 1996, Moreira and his wife Flora Purim collaborated with P.M. Dawn on the song "Non-Fiction Burning" for the AIDS benefit album Red Hot + Rio, produced by the Red Hot Organization.

In 2022, it was announced via the Flora Purim & Airto Moreira Facebook page that Moreira was suffering severe health problems and that his wife Flora was now his full-time caregiver. Their daughter Niura established a GoFundMe page with the aim of raising funds to provide Moreira with funding for medical care.

Airto was inducted as an NEA Jazz Masters in 2026 along with the other inductees Rhonda Hamilton, Carmen Lundy, and Patrice Rushen. Induction is the self-proclaimed highest honors that the United States bestows upon jazz musicians.

== Awards ==
- Moreira was voted the number one percussionist in "Down Beat Magazine's Critics Poll" for the years 1974 through 1982 and most recently in 1993.
- In September 2002, Brazil's President Fernando Henrique Cardoso added Moreira and Purim to the "Order of Rio Branco", one of Brazil's highest honors.

== Discography ==
=== As leader ===
- Natural Feelings (Buddah, 1970)
- Seeds On the Ground (Buddah, 1971)
- Free (CTI, 1972)
- Fingers (CTI, 1973)
- Virgin Land (Salvation, 1974)
- In Concert with Eumir Deodato (CTI, 1974)
- Identity (Arista, 1975)
- Promises of the Sun (Arista, 1976)
- I'm Fine, How Are You? (Warner Bros., 1977)
- Touching You... Touching Me (Warner Bros., 1979)
- Flora Purim & Airto Moreira Live at the Hollywood Bowl 1979 (1979)
- Däfos with Mickey Hart (Reference, 1983)
- Misa Espiritual (Harmonia Mundi, 1983)
- Latino/Aqui Se Puede (Sobocode, 1984)
- Three-Way Mirror (Reference, 1985)
- Humble People with Flora Purim (Concord Jazz, 1985)
- The Magicians with Flora Purim (Crossover, 1986)
- Airto Moreira & Flora Purim Live at Jazzfest Bremen 1988 (1988)
- The Colours of Life with Flora Purim (In+Out, 1988)
- Samba de Flora (Montuno, 1989)
- The Sun Is Out with Flora Purim (Crossover, 1987)
- Struck by Lightning (Venture, 1989)
- The Other Side of This (Rykodisc, 1992)
- Killer Bees (B&W Music, 1993)
- Homeless (M.E.L.T., 2000)
- Revenge of the Killer Bees (M.E.L.T., 2000)
- Life After That (Narada, 2003)
- The Boston Three Party with Chick Corea, Eddie Gomez (Stretch, 2007)
- Live in Berkeley - Airto Moreira & Flora Purim (Airflow, 2012)
- Aluê (Selo, 2017)
- Eu canto assim (NoRPM, 2021)
- Aqui, Oh! with Ricardo Bacalar & Flora Purim (2026)

With Sambalanço Trio

- Sambalanço Trio (Audio Fidelity, 1964)
- Improviso Negro (Ubatuqui, 1965)
- Reencontro com Sambalanço Trio (Som Maior, 1965)

With Fourth World

- Recorded Live At Ronnie Scott's Club (Ronnie Scotts Jazz House 1992)
- Fourth World (B and W Music 1993)
- Encounters of the Fourth World (B and W Music 1995)
- Live in South Africa 1993 (Bootleg.net 1996)
- Last Journey (M.E.L.T. 2000)
- Return Journey (Electro M.E.L.T. 2000)

== Filmography ==
- 2006: Airto & Flora Purim: The Latin Jazz All-Stars

== See also ==
- Mário Negrão

== Sources ==
- Mei, Giancarlo (2017). Spiriti Liberi. L'Avventura Brasiliana Di Flora Purim & Airto Moreira (official biography) (in Italian). Rome, Italy: Arcana Jazz. ISBN 978-8862319546.
