= Retrato em Branco e Preto =

Retrato em Branco e Preto (lit. 'Black and white portrait'; also known as Zingaro) is a Brazilian song composed by Antônio Carlos Jobim, with lyrics in Portuguese by Chico Buarque.

== Background ==
Jobim wrote the song in 1965 as an instrumental piece entitled "Zingaro," which means "gypsy." In a later interview, Jobim said, "It was the story of a musician who eventually has to pawn his violin, has no place to work, is left without his music, totally empty-handed." He released the instrumental version on his 1967 album A Certain Mr. Jobim.

Soon after, he approached Chico Buarque about writing lyrics for the song. Biographer Helena Jobim says that "Tom repeated the theme of 'Zingaro' over and over again, and loads of images, words, sounds, and harmonies came to both musicians... Buarque recorded the melody on tape to elaborate on the verses at home. It was the first time they ever cowrote a song... In this case, his verses were ready in just a few days."

The new piece was re-titled "Retrato em Branco e Preto," which translates into English as "Portrait in White and Black." Jobim asked Buarque why he reversed the usual word order of "black and white". Buarque responded that if he had written "preto e branco" (black and white), the only word that would have rhymed was "tamanco," a kind of clog. The work in English, however, is known as "Portrait in Black and White."

Chico Buarque released the first recording of the song with lyrics on his 1968 album Chico Buarque de Hollanda (Vol. 3).

== English Version ==
An authorized English translation, Picture in Black and White was released in 2011 by Swedish singer Nina Ripe on her debut album Apaixonada which was nominated for Best Album of the Year by Swedish jazz magazine Orkesterjournalen. The lyrics, which were very close to the original, were written by singer and songwriter Johan Christher Schütz.

== Recorded Versions ==
- Antônio Carlos Jobim – A Certain Mr. Jobim (1967), as the instrumental "Zingaro," and Inédito (rec. 1987, released 1995)
- Chico Buarque – Chico Buarque de Hollanda (Vol. 3) (1968)
- Nara Leão – Dez Anos Depois (1971)
- Elis Regina & Antônio Carlos Jobim – Elis & Tom (1974)
- Stan Getz with João Gilberto – The Best of Two Worlds (1975)
- Stan Getz & João Gilberto – Getz/Gilberto '76 (rec. 1976, released 2016)
- João Gilberto – Amoroso (1976), as "Zingaro," João Gilberto Prado Pereira de Oliveira (1980) and Live in Montreux (rec. 1985, released 1987)
- Gábor Szabó – Femme Fatale (rec. 1979, released 1981), as "Zingaro"
- Chet Baker – Chet Baker in Tokyo (1987), and Chet Baker Sings And Plays From The Film "Let's Get Lost (1989)
- Joe Henderson – Double Rainbow: The Music of Antonio Carlos Jobim (1995)
- Paquito D'Rivera – Brazilian Dreams (2002)
- Emilie-Claire Barlow – Like a Lover (2005)
- Toninho Horta – To Jobim with Love (2008)
- Chick Corea & Stefano Bollani – Orvieto (2011)
- Mãeana – Mãeana canta JG (2024)
