= Getz/Gilberto '76 =

Live album by Stan Getz and João Gilberto
- Released: February 19, 2016
- Recorded: May 11–16, 1976
- Venue: Keystone Korner, San Francisco, California
- Genre: Jazz
- Length: 55:07
- Label: Resonance; HLP-9021/HCD-2021
- Producer: Zev Feldman

Stan Getz chronology
The Master (1975)	Getz/Gilberto '76 (2016)	Moments in Time (1976)

João Gilberto chronology
The Best of Two Worlds (1975)	Getz/Gilberto '76 (1976)	Amoroso (1977)

Getz/Gilberto '76 is a live album by saxophonist Stan Getz and guitarist/vocalist João Gilberto which was recorded at the San Francisco jazz club Keystone Korner in 1976 and released on the Resonance label in 2016.

== Reception ==
Professional ratings
Review scores
Source	Rating
AllMusic	4.5/5 stars
The Guardian	4/5 stars

The AllMusic review by Matt Collar called it "some of Getz and Gilberto's best live performances of the period" stating that "Getz and his band were more than amenable to backing the enigmatic Gilberto, who appears here in a variety of settings, from solo to duo to accompaniment by the full band. What's particularly fascinating is hearing how the band adjusts to Gilberto's distinctive and subtle phrasing, his steady guitar pulse anchoring his delicate, fluid vocal melodies. While cuts like 'Chega de Saudade' and 'Doralice' retain all the warmth and beauty of the original 1964 recordings [actually, 'Chega de Saudade' was not recorded by Getz in 1964], at the Keystone Getz and his band color them in surprising yet still thoughtful ways. The result is an evening of organic, dreamlike splendor". Writing in The Observer Dave Gelly said "The original 1964 Getz/Gilberto album is a masterpiece, and this never reaches those heights, but there's something spellbinding about Gilberto's intensity when facing a live audience, close-up".

== Track listing ==
1. Spoken Intro by Stan Getz – 1:09
2. "É Preciso Perdoar" (Carlos Coqueijo, Alcivando Luz) – 5:51
3. "Aguas de Março" (Antônio Carlos Jobim) – 5:47
4. "Retrato Em Branco E Preto" (Jobim, Chico Buarque) – 4:48
5. "Samba da Minha Terra" (Dorival Caymmi) – 3:21
6. "Chega de Saudade" (Jobim, Vinícius de Moraes) – 3:43
7. "Rosa Morena" (Caymmi) – 4:26
8. "Eu Vim da Bahia" (Gilberto Gil) – 4:12
9. "João Marcelo" (João Gilberto) – 3:21
10. "Doralice" (Caymmi, Antônio Almeida) – 3:48
11. "Morena Boca de Ouro" (Ary Barroso) – 3:34
12. "Um Abraço No Bonfá" (Gilberto) – 4:39
13. "É Preciso Perdoar (Encore)" (Coqueijo, Luz) – 6:28

== Personnel ==
- João Gilberto – guitar, vocals
- Stan Getz – tenor saxophone
- Joanne Brackeen – piano
- Clint Houston – bass
- Billy Hart – drums
