= B.B. (album) =

Studio album by Brigitte Bardot
- Released: 1964
- Genre: Pop
- Length: 24:09
- Label: Philips

Brigitte Bardot chronology
Brigitte Bardot Sings (1963)	B.B. (1964)	Bonnie and Clyde (1968)

B.B. is the second studio album of French singer and actress Brigitte Bardot and was released in 1964 by Philips Records. The album followed her 1962 debut and features a selection of French pop songs with arrangements by Alain Goraguer and his orchestra.

The release includes the singles "Moi je joue" and "Ne me laisse pas l’aimer", both of which charted on the Salut les copains rankings in early 1964. "Moi je joue" later became one of Bardot’s most recognizable tracks from this period.

Among the songs is "Maria Ninguém", a Brazilian bossa nova piece performed by Bardot in Portuguese.

== Background ==
The record followed her 1962 debut album Brigitte Bardot and features a collection of French pop tracks in a light, melodic style characteristic of the early 1960s. It also includes the single "Moi Je Joue", one of Bardot's most recognizable songs from this period. The release features arrangements by Alain Goraguer and his orchestra.

Two tracks from the album, "Ne me laisse pas l'aimer" and "Maria Ninguém", were written by young composers Jean Michel Rivat and Francis Fumières, and were recorded shortly before the album's release. The latter is a Brazilian bossa nova classic originally popularized by artists like João Gilberto and Herbie Mann. Bardot performs the track in Portuguese, the national language, some sources claim that she learn the song, composed by Carlos Lyra, during the summer of 1964, when she spent her first season in Búzios alongside Moroccan playboy Bob Zagury.

== Singles ==
"Ça pourrait changer", a French adaptation of Patsy Ann Noble's 1963 song "Don't You Ever Change Your Mind", entered the Salut les copains chart in January 1964 at number 47. The single climbed to its peak position of number 32 the following month before exiting the chart magazine.

In February 1964, another single, "Ne me laisse pas l'aimer", appeared on the same chart, reaching number 42. Decades later, the song was featured in the 2013 film Love Is in the Air.

== Critical reception ==
Professional ratings
Review scores
Source	Rating
AllMusic	2/5 stars

AllMusic critic Stewart Mason argues that, despite its "come-hither" cover, B.B. is "largely an uninspired collection of second-rate songs" delivered through "half-hearted, disinterested performances" by Bardot. He notes that only "Maria Ninguem" and the single "Moi je joue" stand out, concluding that, aside from the fetching cover, the album "is of no more interest than a Shelley Fabares album".

== Track listing ==
Side 1
No.	Title	Writer(s)	Length
1.	"Moi je joue"	G. Bourgeois, J.-M. Rivière	1:43
2.	"Une histoire de plage"	G. Bourgeois, J.-M. Rivière, Yani Spanos	1:50
3.	"Ça pourrait changer" ("Don't You Ever Change Your Mind")	B. Barratt, G. Bourgeois, J.-M. Rivière	2:00
4.	"À la fin de l'été (tu sais)"	G. Bourgeois, J.-M. Rivière	2:17
5.	"Ne me laisse pas l'aimer"	F. Furrière, M. Rivat	2:35
6.	"Maria Ninguém" ("Marie l'amour")	Carlos Lyra, C. Jolliet	2:30

Side 2
No.	Title	Writer(s)	Length
1.	"Je danse donc je suis"	André Popp, J.-C. Massoulier	1:52
2.	"Melanie"	G. Bourgeois, J.-M. Rivière	2:02
3.	"Ciel de lit"	G. Bourgeois, Gloria Lasso, J.-M. Rivière	1:40
4.	"Un jour comme un autre"	G. Bourgeois, J.-M. Rivière	2:18
5.	"Les Cheveux dans le vent"	G. Bourgeois, J.-P. Calvet, J.-M. Rivière	1:40
6.	"Jamais trois sans quatre"	G. Bourgeois, J.-M. Rivière	2:15

== Personnel ==
Credits adapted from the liner noter of the LP B.B..

- Recorded 17, 18, 23, 26, 27, 30 December 1963 / 2 January 1964 at Studio Blanqui (Paris).
- Conductor (Direction D'orchestre) – Alain Goraguer
- Engineer (Prise De Son) – Roger Roche
- Orchestra – Alain Goraguer Et Son Orchestre
- Producer – Claude Dejacques
