= Olga Albizu =

American painter

- Born: Olga Albizu Rosaly; May 31, 1924; Ponce, Puerto Rico
- Died: July 30, 2005 (aged 81); New York City, New York, United States
- Education: University of Puerto Rico (BA)
- Known for: Painting
- Notable work: Various record covers
- Movement: Abstract Expressionist
- Awards: 2nd Prize, Ateneo Puertorriqueño, Puerto Rico; 2nd Prize, Esso Salon of Young Artists, San Juan, Puerto Rico
- Patrons: Stan Getz

Olga Albizu Rosaly (31 May 1924 – 30 July 2005) was an abstract expressionist painter from Ponce, Puerto Rico. Albizu Rosaly was the first woman dedicated to abstraction in Puerto Rico.

== Life ==
Albizu was born to a relatively wealthy family and raised in Puerto Rico, where she studied painting with the Spanish painter Esteban Vicente from 1943 to 1947. She received a BA from the University of Puerto Rico in 1946. In 1948, she moved to New York City on a fellowship for post-graduate work at the Art Students League, where she studied under Morris Kantor, Carl Holty, and Vaclav Vytlacil. She also studied with Hans Hofmann and subsequently became his apprentice. After that, she did further studies in Europe at the Académie de la Grande Chaumière in Paris and the Accademia di Belle Arti in Florence. Later, she spent a year painting in the Provence, as painters such as Van Gogh and Paul Cézanne had done before her. In 1953, she returned to New York.

In 1957, Albizu premiered in The First Comprehensive Exhibition of Contemporary Puerto Rican Artists. Paintings by Albizu were formally inaugurated at the Pan American Union June 16, 1966. Albizu was extensively exhibited in Puerto Rico, Israel, and the United States.

== Works ==
Her works have been used in the artwork of various record covers, including a number of albums by Stan Getz.
Stan Getz:

- Jazz Samba, 1962
- Big Band Bossa Nova, 1962
- Jazz Samba Encore!, 1963
- Getz/Gilberto, 1964
- Getz/Gilberto Vol. 2, 1966

Bill Evans:

- Trio 64, 1964

Alibizu's work was included in the Smithsonian American Art Museum's 2013 exhibit, "Our America: The Latino Presence in American Art," and her work, "Radiante" (1967), is part of the collection and was used as one of several new banners at the entrance to the Museum in 2017.

== Awards ==
- Honored at Ponce's Park of the Illustrious Ponce Citizens.
- 2nd prize, Ateneo Puertorriqueño, Puerto Rico 1967
- 2nd prize, Esso Salon of Young Artists, San Juan, Puerto Rico 1964
