= Só Danço Samba (song) =

1962 song by Antônio Carlos Jobim

"Só Danço Samba" (aka "Jazz 'n' Samba") is a bossa nova song composed in 1962 by Antônio Carlos Jobim, with lyrics by Vinicius de Moraes. English lyrics were later written by Norman Gimbel. On occasion, it has also been known as "Jazz Samba" and "I Only Dance Samba", an English translation of the original Portuguese title.

In Bossa Nova: The Story of the Brazilian Music That Seduced the World, author Ruy Castro suggests that the song was part of a failed movement to invent a bossa nova dance. "Jobim, who had never danced in his life, had just finished writing 'Só danço samba' [Jazz 'n' Samba] with Vinicius, but it was without much conviction. So much so, in fact, that on hearing 'Só danço samba' for the first time, João Gilberto asked him, 'What's this Tomzinho? A boogie-woogie?'"

The song was first performed by João Gilberto and Os Cariocas in August 1962 at the Au Bon Gourmet restaurant in Copacabana, Rio de Janeiro, at what Castro calls "the bossa nova show to end all bossa nova shows", as it featured Jobim, Gilberto, Vinícius de Moraes and Os Cariocas on stage together for the first and last time.

A few months later, Gilberto and Os Cariocas performed the song again in the Italian film, Copacabana Palace (1962), in which they are briefly shown singing together.

Elza Laranjeira released the first recording of "Só danço samba" in October 1962.

== Recorded versions ==
- Elza Laranjeira – "Só Danço Samba" single (October 1962)
- João Donato – A Bossa Muito Moderna (1963)
- Herb Ellis & Charlie Byrd – Guitar/Guitar (1963)
- Stan Getz & Luiz Bonfá – Jazz Samba Encore! (1963) as "Só Danço Samba (I Only Dance Samba)"
- Antônio Carlos Jobim – The Composer of Desafinado, Plays (1963), and Antonio Brasileiro (1994)
- Roberto Menescal e Seu Conjunto – A Bossa Nova (1963)
- Os Cariocas – A Bossa dos Cariocas (1963)
- Elza Soares – "Só Danço Samba" (single) - (1963)
- Tamba Trio – Avanço (1963)
- Walter Wanderley – Samba No Esquema de Walter Wanderley (1963)
- Clare Fischer – So Danço Samba (1964)
- Stan Getz & João Gilberto – Getz/Gilberto (1964)
- Milt Jackson – Jazz 'n' Samba (1964)
- Charlie Byrd – Brazilian Byrd (1965), and My Inspiration: Music of Brazil (1999)
- The Sergio Mendes Trio – The Swinger from Rio (1965), with Antônio Carlos Jobim, Hubert Laws, Art Farmer & Phil Woods
- Wanda de Sah (Wanda Sá) - Softly! (1965)
- Ella Fitzgerald – The Stockholm Concert, 1966 (rec. 1966, released 1984), and Ella and Duke at the Cote D'Azur (1967)
- Dick Hyman – Brasilian Impressions (1967)
- Sergio Mendes & Brasil '66 – Equinox (1967)
- Helen Merrill – Bossa Nova in Tokyo (1967)
- Baden Powell – Live in Hamburg (rec. 1983, released 1995)
- Karrin Allyson – Daydream (1997)
- Eliane Elias – Eliane Elias Sings Jobim (1998)
- Lisa Ono – Bossa Carioca / ボッサ・カリオカ (1998)
- Rosa Passos – Curare (1991), and Me and My Heart (2001)
- Yo-Yo Ma – Obrigado Brazil Live in Concert (2004)
- John Pizzarelli – Bossa Nova (2004)
- Jacintha – The Girl from Bossa Nova (2004)
- Emilie-Claire Barlow – Like a Lover (2005)
- Vanessa da Mata – Vanessa da Mata Canta Tom Jobim (2013)
- Vinicius Cantuária – Vinícius Canta Antonio Carlos Jobim (2015)
