= Stan Getz Meets João & Astrud Gilberto =

Stan Getz meets João & Astrud Gilberto: New York 1964

Live album by Stan Getz, João Gilberto, Astrud Gilberto
- Released: 1990
- Recorded: 1964
- Genre: Bossa nova
- Label: Giants of Jazz

Stan Getz meets João & Astrud Gilberto: New York 1964 is a live recording of bossa nova in the making. In 1990, the Giants of Jazz label released a live recording of a 1964 New York City performance featuring Stan Getz, João Gilberto and Astrud Gilberto, the latter's then-wife. The album, entitled Stan Getz meets João & Astrud Gilberto is actually misleading: the trio had met previously in 1963 for the recording of the wildly successful album Getz/Gilberto, which was released in 1964 and set off the bossa nova frenzy in the U.S. As a result of that album’s success, the Brazilian Gilbertos and the American Getz played a number of shows in the U.S., such as the one recorded here. Released as part of the “Immortal Concerts” series, this recording exhibits the chemistry the three obviously shared and captures bossa nova in its infancy, as it was still being created and defined.

== Track listing ==
1. Corcovado (Quiet Nights)
2. O Pato
3. It Might as Well Be Spring
4. Samba De Minha Terra
5. One Note Samba
6. Tonight I Shall Sleep with a Smile on My Face
7. Bim Bom
8. The Singing Song
9. The Telephone Song
10. Here's That Rainy Day
11. Eu E Voce
12. Rosa Moreno
13. Grandfather's Waltz
14. Only Trust Your Heart
15. Um Abraco No Bonfa
16. Stan's Blues
17. Meditation
18. Summertime
19. Six-Nix-Pix-Flix
