= João Voz e Violão =

Studio album by João Gilberto
- Released: 2000
- Recorded: 2000
- Genre: Bossa Nova
- Length: 30:08
- Label: Universal
- Producer: Caetano Veloso

João Gilberto chronology
| Eu Sei que Vou Te Amar (1994) | João Voz e Violão (2000) | Live at Umbria Jazz (2002) |

Professional ratings
Review scores
| Source | Rating |
|---|---|
| Allmusic | 3/5 stars |

João Voz e Violão (English: João: Voice and (Acoustic) Guitar) is a bossa nova album by João Gilberto, released in 2000. Recording very little in the 1990s, this album is Gilberto's first studio album since 1991's João. The album won the 2001 Grammy Award for Best World Music Album.

== Recording ==
João went to Moogie Canazio's studio to start recording his next album. It was the first time Moogie would work with João, he had an idea of how to record him and was nervous because he knew how demanding João was with his sound. The first thing he did was to take the headphones out of the studio because João didn't play with headphones at home and as he said himself: "The best of João Gilberto is when he plays at home".

After setting up the microphones and starting to record, João played for only a minute and a half and then stopped. Then he asked to come up to the control room to listen. Moogie didn't even have time to get the sound right.

João went up and listened to what he had just played. He was silent, didn't say anything. After five minutes, Carmela Forsin, his manager, who was also in the control room, said: "João, are you still with us?" and he said: "Yes, I am... Mooguinho come here with me". At this moment, Moogie thought João was going to say it was really bad or something, but it turned out to be the biggest compliment of his career. João entered the studio with him, hugged him and said: "Mooguinho you have recorded my soul. All my life after listening to what I recorded I don't like what I hear, this time I like it, but my voice is not good today. Let's stop the session, we'll come back tomorrow."

The album was finished after three or four sessions.

== Track listing ==
1. "Desde que o Samba é Samba" (Caetano Veloso) – 3:54
2. "Você Vai Ver" (Antônio Carlos Jobim) – 2:56
3. "Eclipse" (Margarita Lecuona) – 3:04
4. "Não Vou Pra Casa" (Antônio de Almeida, Roberto Roberti) – 2:56
5. "Desafinado" (Jobim, Newton Mendonça) – 3:27
6. "Eu Vim da Bahia" (Gilberto Gil) – 2:34
7. "Coração Vagabundo" (Veloso) – 2:08
8. "Da Cor do Pecado" (Bororó) – 2:29
9. "Segredo" (Herivelto Martins, Marino Pinto) – 3:15
10. "Chega de Saudade" (Vinicius de Moraes, Jobim) – 3:25

== Personnel ==
- João Gilberto - Acoustic guitar, vocals
