= Brasil (1981 album) =

1981 studio album by João Gilberto

Studio album by João Gilberto (with Caetano Veloso, Gilberto Gil and Maria Bethânia)
- Released: 1981
- Genre: MPB, bossa nova
- Label: Warner Bros.
- Producer: João Gilberto

João Gilberto chronology
João Gilberto Prado Pereira de Oliveira (1980)	Brasil (1981)	interpreta Tom Jobim (1985)

Caetano Veloso chronology
Outras Palavras (1981)	Brasil (1981)	Cores, Nomes (1982)

Gilberto Gil chronology
A gente precisa ver o luar (1981)	Brasil (1981)	Um Banda Um (1982)

Maria Bethânia chronology
Alteza (1981)	Brasil (1981)	Nossos Momentos (1982)

Professional ratings
Review scores
Source	Rating
AllMusic	(review of the Amoroso/Brasil CD pack).

Brasil is a 1981 album by Brazilian artist João Gilberto, featuring Caetano Veloso, Gilberto Gil and Maria Bethânia. The album was later released along with João Gilberto's 1977 album Amoroso.

== Track listing ==
No.	Title	Writer(s)	Length
1.	"Aquarela do Brasil (Brasil)"	Ary Barroso	6:34
2.	"Disse Alguém (All of Me)"	Haroldo Barbosa, Gerald Marks, Seymour Simons	5:18
3.	"Bahia com H"	Denis Brean (Augusto Duarte Ribeiro)	5:13
4.	"No Tabuleiro da Baiana"	Ary Barroso	4:50
5.	"Milagre"	Dorival Caymmi	4:57
6.	"Cordeiro de Nanã"	Dadinho, Mateus	1:20
