= Fred Bongusto =

Italian singer (1935–2019)

Commendatore Fred Bongusto
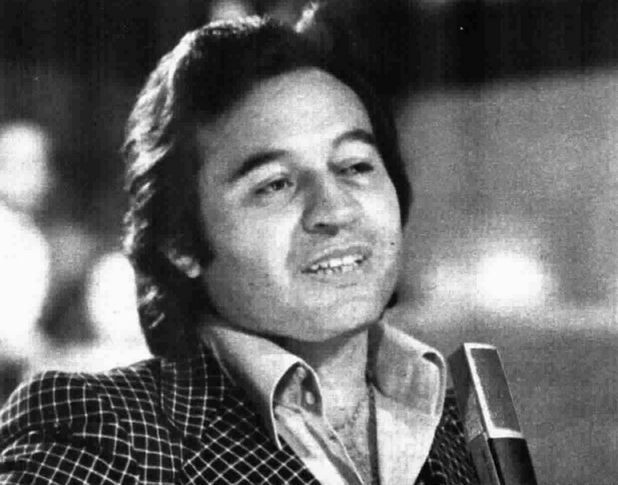
- Fred Bongusto in July 1975
- Born: Alfredo Antonio Carlo Buongusto; 6 April 1935; Campobasso, Kingdom of Italy
- Died: 8 November 2019 (aged 84); Rome, Italy
- Occupations: Singer; musician

Alfredo Antonio Carlo "Fred" Buongusto (6 April 1935 – 8 November 2019) was an Italian light music singer, songwriter and composer who was very popular in the 1960s and 1970s.

== Career history ==
Bongusto was born in Campobasso in 1935. He made his recording debut with the song "Bella Bellissima", a song written by Ghigo Agosti and produced by the Milan-based label Primary. It was released on phonographic record in 1960. Some of his most successful songs include "Amore fermati", "Una rotonda sul mare", "Spaghetti a Detroit" and "Prima c'eri tu", which won the 1966 edition of Un disco per l'estate. Bongusto's proclivity for exploring Latin American rhythms and American Big Band swing made him very popular in South America, especially in Brazil. He had collaborated with Toquinho, Vinicius de Moraes and João Gilberto, who successfully covered Bongusto's song "Malaga" in his 1991 album João.

In the 1990s, he was elected as a PSI town councillor in Bari. On 18 March 2005, Prime Minister Silvio Berlusconi]] presented him with a silver plate to celebrate the 50th anniversary of his musical debut. On 2 June 2005, he was awarded the title of Commendatore by President Carlo Azeglio Ciampi.

== Personal life ==
He was married to Gabriella Palazzoli.

Bongusto spent much of his time in Ischia, in the village of Sant'Angelo. Bongusto died in Rome on 8 November 2019, after a long illness, at the age of 84.
