= The Master (Stan Getz album) =

Studio album by Stan Getz
- Released: 1982
- Recorded: October 1, 1975; New York City
- Genre: Jazz
- Length: 40:51
- Label: Columbia; FC 38272
- Producer: Stan Getz

Stan Getz chronology
The Peacocks (1975)	The Master (1982)	Getz/Gilberto '76 (1976)

The Master is an album by saxophonist Stan Getz which was recorded in 1975 but not released on the Columbia label until 1982.

== Reception ==
Professional ratings
Review scores
Source	Rating
AllMusic	3/5 stars
The Rolling Stone Jazz Record Guide	3/5 stars

The AllMusic review by Scott Yanow stated "More straightahead than Getz's other Columbia albums of the period, this set finds him really pushing himself".

== Track listing ==
1. "Summer Night" (Al Dubin, Harry Warren) - 9:59
2. "Raven's Wood" (Ralph Towner) - 10:54
3. "Lover Man (Oh, Where Can You Be?)" (Jimmy Davis, Ram Ramirez, James Sherman) - 9:25
4. "Invitation" (Bronisław Kaper, Paul Francis Webster) - 10:34

== Personnel ==
- Stan Getz - tenor saxophone
- Albert Dailey - piano
- Clint Houston - bass
- Billy Hart - drums
