= João Gilberto Prado Pereira de Oliveira (album) =

Prado Pereira de Oliveira

Studio album by João Gilberto
- Released: 1980
- Genre: Bossa nova, samba, jazz
- Label: WEA

João Gilberto chronology
| Gilberto and Jobim (1977) | Prado Pereira de Oliveira (1980) | Brasil (1981) |

João Gilberto Prado Pereira de Oliveira was released in 1980 by João Gilberto. It was recorded in 1980 live on TV Globo. In English, that would be his entire Brazilian ancestral last name written on his studio album.

== Track listing ==
| # | Title | Songwriters | Length |
|---|---|---|---|
| 1. | "Menino Do Rio" | Caetano Veloso | 3:28 |
| 2. | "Curare" | Bororó | 3:48 |
| 3. | "Retrato Em Branco E Preto" | Chico Buarque, Antonio Carlos Jobim | 4:21 |
| 4. | "Chega de Saudade" | Antonio Carlos Jobim, Vinicius de Moraes | 3:45 |
| 5. | "Desafinado" | Newton Mendonça, Antonio Carlos Jobim | 4:02 |
| 6. | "O Pato" | Jayme Silva, Neusa Teixeira | 3:25 |
| 7. | "Eu e a Brisa" | Johnny Alf | 3:39 |
| 8. | "Jou Jou e Balangandans" | Lamartine Babo | 3:52 |
| 9. | "Canta Brasil" | David Nasser, Alcyr Pires Vermelho | 5:51 |
| 10. | "Aquarela Do Brasil" | Ary Barroso | 5:24 |
| 11. | "Bahia Com H" | Denis Brean | 3:24 |
| 12. | "Tim Tim Por Tim Tim" | Geraldo Jacques, Haroldo Barbosa | 3:39 |
| 13. | "Estate" | Bruno Martino, Bruno Brighetti | 6:05 |

"Chega de Saudade" was performed with Bebel Gilberto and "Jou Jou e Balangandans" was performed with Rita Lee.

== Personnel ==
- Guitar/Vocals - João Gilberto
- Singer - Bebel Gilberto
- Singer - Rita Lee
- Arranged by - Guto Graça Mello (Menino do Rio), João Donato (Jou Jou Balangandãs), Dori Caymmi (Eu e a Brisa), Lindolfo Gaya (Canta Brasil)
- Conductor - Alceo Bocchino
- CD Reissue, Digital Producers João Gilberto and Arnaldo DeSouteiro

== Sources ==
- Gridley, Mark. Jazz Styles: History and Analysis. 9th. NJ: Pearson Prentice Hall, Print.
