= Maria Ninguém =

1959 song by João Gilberto

Song by João Gilberto

from the album Chega de Saudade
- Released: April 1959
- Genre: Bossa nova
- Length: 2:21
- Label: Odeon
- Songwriter: Carlos Lyra
- Producer: Antônio Carlos Jobim

"Maria Ninguém" ("Maria Nobody") is a song written by Carlos Lyra and first released by Brazilian bossa nova singer João Gilberto on his album Chega de Saudade in April 1959. It has been covered by numerous artists, most notably by Cliff Richard, who sang a Spanish-language version titled "Maria No Mas".

== Cliff Richard version ==
"Maria No Mas"
- Cover of the single released in the Netherlands

Single by Cliff Richard and the Shadows

from the album When in Spain
- Released: November 1963
- Recorded: 1 May & 28 May 1963
- Studio: EMI Studios, Barcelona; Abbey Road Studios, London
- Genre: Pop
- Length: 2:07
- Label: Columbia
- Songwriters: Carlos Lyra; Manuel Salina
- Producer: Norrie Paramor

Cliff Richard and the Shadows singles chronology
"Don't Talk to Him" (1963)	"Maria No Mas" (1963)	"I'm the Lonely One" (1964)

Originally written and recorded in Portuguese, it was rewritten in Spanish for Cliff Richard and the Shadows' album When in Spain.

=== Release ===
"Maria No Mas" was released as a single in Belgium and the Netherlands in November 1963 with the B-side, "Tus Besos", written by Lionel Newman. In Germany, it was released in March 1964 with the B-side being a cover of "Spanish Harlem", written by Jerry Leiber and Phil Spector. Both B-sides of these two releases were solely credited to Cliff Richard, with backing by the Norrie Paramor Orchestra. In Spain, an EP titled Un Saludo de Cliff was released in 1963, with four tracks from When in Spain.

=== Track listing ===
7": Columbia / CH 3035 (Belgium & Netherlands)

1. "Maria No Mas" – 2:07
2. "Tus Besos" – 2:50

7": Columbia / C 22 667 (Germany)

1. "Maria No Mas" – 2:07
2. "Spanish Harlem" – 2:58

EP: Odeon / 7EPL 13.955 (Spain)

1. "Maria No Mas" – 2:07
2. "Quizas, Quizas, Quizas" – 2:31
3. "La Cancion de Orfeo" – 3:53
4. "Me Lo Dijo Adela" – 2:04

=== Personnel ===
- Cliff Richard – vocals
- Hank Marvin – lead guitar
- Bruce Welch – rhythm guitar, backing vocals
- Brian Locking – bass guitar
- Brian Bennett – drums

=== Charts ===
Chart (1963–64)	Peak position
Belgium (Ultratop 50 Flanders)	4
Belgium (Ultratop 50 Wallonia)	45
Netherlands (Single Top 100)	2
Spain (Promusicae)	16
Venezuela	3

== Other versions ==
- In 1959, Carlos Lyra released his own version on his version on his debut album Bossa Nova.
- In 1964, French singer Brigitte Bardot covered the song on her album B.B..
