= When in Spain =

1963 studio album by Cliff Richard

Studio album by Cliff Richard
- Released: 6 September 1963
- Recorded: 28 April – 1 May 1963, Barcelona
- Genre: Pop
- Label: Columbia
- Producer: Norrie Paramor

Cliff Richard chronology
| Cliff's Hit Album (1963) | When in Spain (1963) | Wonderful Life (1964) |

Professional ratings
Review scores
| Source | Rating |
|---|---|
| New Record Mirror | 4/5 stars |

When in Spain is a foreign language studio album by Cliff Richard and The Shadows released in 1963. It is Richard's sixth studio album and tenth album overall. The album of Spanish standards reached number 8 on the UK Album Charts.

== Track listing ==
Taken from the sleeve notes:

1. "Perfidia" (Alberto Domínguez)
2. "Amor Amor Amor" (Ricardo Lopez Mendez, Gabriel Ruíz) with The Norrie Paramor Strings
3. "Frenesí" (Alberto Domínguez)
4. "Solamente una vez" ("You Belong to My Heart") (Agustín Lara)
5. "Vaya Con Dios" ("May God Be With You") (Larry Russell, Inez James, and Buddy Pepper) with The Norrie Paramor Strings
6. "Me Lo Dijo Adela" ("Sweet and Gentle") (Otilio Portal)
7. "Maria No Mas" ("Maria Ninguém") (Carlos Lyra, M. Salina)
8. "Tus Besos" ("Kiss") (Lionel Newman) with The Norrie Paramor Strings
9. "Quizás, Quizás, Quizás" ("Perhaps, Perhaps, Perhaps") (Osvaldo Farrés)
10. "Te Quiero, Dijiste" ("Magic is the Moonlight") (María Grever, Charles Pasquale)
11. "Canción de Orfeo" ("Carnival") (Antônio Maria, Luiz Bonfá) with The Norrie Paramor Strings
12. "Quién será" ("Sway") (Pablo Beltrán Ruiz)

== Personnel ==
Taken from the sleeve notes and other references:

- Cliff Richard - lead vocals
- Norrie Paramor - producer
- The Norrie Paramor Strings

The Shadows:

- Hank Marvin - lead guitar
- Bruce Welch - rhythm guitar
- Brian Locking - bass guitar
- Brian Bennett - drums
