= João Gilberto en México =

João Gilberto en Mexico

Studio album by João Gilberto
- Released: 1970
- Recorded: 1970
- Studio: Mexico
- Genre: Bossa nova
- Label: Orfeon Videovox (MX), Philips (BR)

João Gilberto chronology
Getz/Gilberto Vol. 2 (1966)	João Gilberto en Mexico (1970)	João Gilberto (album) (1973)

João Gilberto en México, (also known as Ela é Carioca), is a 1970 album by João Gilberto. Purportedly, after living in the United States, where he recorded the landmark album Getz/Gilberto, among other works, João stayed in Mexico for what ended up being two years, instead of an initially planned short visit. João Gilberto en Mexico is the assemblage he completed during his stay.

== Track listing ==
1. "De Conversa Em Conversa" (Lúcio Alves, Haroldo Barbosa)
2. "Ela é Carioca" (Tom Jobim, Vinicius de Moraes)
3. "O Sapo" (João Donato)
4. "Esperança Perdida" (Tom Jobim, Billy Blanco)
5. "Trolley Song" (Irving Berlin, Vrs. Haroldo Barbosa)
6. "João Marcelo" (João Gilberto)
7. "Farolito" (Agustín Lara)
8. "Astronauta" (Samba da Pergunta) (Pingarilho, Marcos Vasconcellos)
9. "Acapulco" (João Gilberto)
10. "Bésame Mucho" (Consuelo Velasquez)
11. "Eclipse" (Ernesto Lecuona)
