= Eu Sei que Vou Te Amar (album) =

Eu Sei Que Vou Te Amar

Studio album by João Gilberto
- Released: 1994
- Genre: Bossa Nova/Samba/Jazz
- Label: Epic

João Gilberto chronology
| João (album) (1991) | Eu Sei Que Vou Te Amar (1994) | João Voz e Violão (2000) |

Eu Sei que Vou Te Amar was released in 1994 in Brazil by João Gilberto. It was recorded live at Heineken Concerts, present by TV Cultura.

== Track listing ==
| # | Title | Songwriters | Length |
|---|---|---|---|
| 1. | "Eu Sei Que Vou Te Amar" | Antônio Carlos Jobim, Vinicius de Moraes | 3:43 |
| 2. | "Desafinado" | Antônio Carlos Jobim, Newton Mendonça | 4:07 |
| 3. | "Voce Nao Sabe Amar" | Dorival Caymmi, Carlos Guinle, Hugo Lima | 2:19 |
| 4. | "Fotografia" | Antônio Carlos Jobim | 2:21 |
| 5. | "Rosa Morena" | Dorival Caymmi | 3:16 |
| 6. | "La Vem a Baiana" | Dorival Caymmi | 2:21 |
| 7. | "Pra Que Discuitir Com Madame" | Haroldo Barbosa, Antônio de Almeida | 2:53 |
| 8. | "Isto Aqui O Que E?" | Ary Barroso | 3:03 |
| 9. | "Meditation (Meditação)" | Antônio Carlos Jobim, Newton Mendonça | 3:11 |
| 10. | "Da Cor Do Pecado" | Bororó | 2:32 |
| 11. | "Guacyra" | Hekel Tavares, Juracy Camargo | 1:34 |
| 12. | "Se E Por Falta de Adeus" | Antônio Carlos Jobim, Dolores Duran | 2:46 |
| 13. | "Chega de Saudade" | Antônio Carlos Jobim, Vinícius de Moraes | 3:18 |
| 14. | "A Valsa de Quem Não Tem Amor" | Custódio Mesquita, Evaldo Rui | 1:49 |
| 15. | "Corcovado" | Antônio Carlos Jobim | 2:28 |
| 16. | "Estate" | Bruno Martino, Bruno Bringhetti | 2:12 |
| 17. | "O Amor em Paz" | Antônio Carlos Jobim, Vinícius de Moraes | 2:50 |
| 18. | "Aos Pés da Crus" | Marino Pinto, Zé da Zilda | 2:14 |

== Personnel ==
- Guitar/Vocals - João Gilberto
