= And God Created Woman =

And God Created Woman may refer to:

- And God Created Woman (1956 film), directed by Roger Vadim, starring Brigitte Bardot
  - And God Created Woman (soundtrack), an album based on the soundtrack of the above film
- And God Created Woman (1988 film), directed by Roger Vadim, starring Rebecca De Mornay
- "And God Created Woman" (Father Ted), an episode of Father Ted
- "And God Created Woman", a song by Prince from the Love Symbol Album

== See also ==
- Et Dieu Créa La Femme, a 1990 album by The Times
