= Live at Umbria Jazz =

Studio album by João Gilberto
- Released: 2002
- Recorded: 1996
- Studio: Perugia, Italy
- Genre: Bossa nova, samba, jazz

João Gilberto chronology
João Voz e Violão (2000)	Live at Umbria Jazz (2002)	In Tokyo (2004)

Live at Umbria Jazz was released in 2002 in Brazil by João Gilberto. The album was recorded live at the Umbria Jazz Festival at the Teatro Morlacchi in Perugia, Italy on 21 July 1996.

== Track listing ==
#	Title	Songwriters
1.	"Isto Aqui o Que É?"	Ary Barroso
2.	"De Conversa em Conversa"	Lúcio Alves, Haroldo Barbosa
3.	"Pra Que Discutir com Madame?"	Haroldo Barbosa, Janet de Almeida
4.	"Malaga"	João Gilberto, Fred Bongusto
5.	"Estate"	Bruno Martino, Bruno Brighetti
6.	"Lá Vem a Baiana"	Dorival Caymmi
7.	"Corcovado"	Antônio Carlos Jobim
8.	"Doralice"	Dorival Caymmi, Antonio de Almeida
9.	"Rosa Morena"	Dorival Caymmi
10.	"Desafinado"	Antônio Carlos Jobim, Newton Mendonça
11.	"Saudade da Bahia"	Dorival Caymmi
12.	"O pato"	Jaime Silva, Neuza Teixeira
13.	"Chega de Saudade"	Antônio Carlos Jobim, Vinicius de Moraes
14.	"Girl from Ipanema"	Antônio Carlos Jobim, Vinicius de Moraes

== Personnel ==
- Guitar/Vocals - João Gilberto
