= Live in Montreux =

Live album by João Gilberto
- Released: 1987
- Recorded: July 18, 1985
- Studio: Montreux, Switzerland
- Genre: Bossa Nova, Jazz
- Length: 69:50
- Label: Elektra/Musician

João Gilberto chronology
Live at the 19th Montreux Jazz Festival (1986)	Live in Montreux (1987)	Joao (1991)

Professional ratings
Review scores
Source	Rating
Allmusic	link

Live in Montreux is a bossa nova album by João Gilberto, recorded live in the 1985 Montreux Jazz Festival and released in 1987. This is a single-disc edition of the double album Live at the 19th Montreux Jazz Festival, released in 1986.

== Track listing ==
1. "Sem Compromisso" (Geraldo Pereira, Nelson Trigueiro) – 4:05
2. "Menino do Rio" (Caetano Veloso) – 3:45
3. "Retrato em Branco e Preto" (Chico Buarque, Antônio Carlos Jobim) – 6:36
4. "Pra que Discutir com Madame" (Haroldo Barbosa, Antonio Almeida) – 6:25
5. "Garota de Ipanema" (Jobim, Vinicius de Moraes) – 3:42
6. "Adeus América" (Barbosa, Geraldo Jacques) – 6:50
7. "Estate" (Bruno Brighetti, Bruno Martino) – 5:18
8. "Morena Boca de Ouro" (Ary Barroso) – 5:37
9. "A Felicidade" (Jobim, de Moraes) – 5:10
10. "Preconceito" (Marino Pinto, Wilson Batista) – 2:25
11. "Isto Aqui o Que E" [labelled "Sandalia de Prata"] (Barroso) – 6:43
12. "Rosa Morena" (Dorival Caymmi) – 5:24
13. "Aquarela do Brasil" (Barroso) – 7:50

== Personnel ==
- João Gilberto – Acoustic guitar and vocals
