= In Tokyo =

Live album by João Gilberto
- Released: 2004
- Recorded: September 12, 2003
- Venue: Tokyo, Japan
- Genre: Bossa Nova
- Length: 68:48
- Label: Verve Records
- Producer: Carmela Forsin, Yutaka Toyama, Shegeki Miyata and João Gilberto

João Gilberto chronology
Live at Umbria Jazz (2002)	In Tokyo (2004)	For Tokyo (2007)

Professional ratings
Review scores
Source	Rating
AllMusic	4/5 stars

In Tokyo is a bossa nova album by João Gilberto, recorded live in Tokyo (Japan) in September 2003 and released in 2004.

== Track listing ==
1. "Acontece que Eu Sou Baiano" (Caymmi) – 2:56
2. "Meditação" (Gimbel, Jobim, Mendonça) – 5:33
3. "Doralice" (Almeida, Caymmi) – 3:16
4. "Corcovado" (Jobim, Lees) – 4:32
5. "Este Seu Olhar" (Jobim) – 4:34
6. "Isto Aqui o que É ?" (Barroso) – 4:29
7. "Wave" (Jobim) – 4:36
8. "Pra que Discutir com Madame ?" (Barbosa, Almeida) – 6:01
9. "Ligia" (Jobim) – 5:37
10. "Louco" (Almeida, Batista) – 4:38
11. "Bolinha de Papel" (Pereira) – 4:08
12. "Rosa Morena" (Caymmi) – 5:35
13. "Adeus América" (Barbosa, Geraldo) – 5:12
14. "Preconceito" (Batista, Pinto) – 3:55
15. "Aos Pés da Cruz" (Da Zilda, Pinto) – 3:56

== Personnel ==
- João Gilberto - Acoustic guitar and vocals
