= The Best of Two Worlds =

Best of Two Worlds

Studio album by Stan Getz and João Gilberto
- Released: 1976
- Recorded: May 21, 1975; New York City
- Genres: Bossa nova; samba; jazz
- Length: 42:44
- Languages: English; Portuguese
- Label: Columbia
- Producer: Stan Getz

Stan Getz chronology
But Beautiful (1974)	Best of Two Worlds (1976)	The Peacocks (1975)

João Gilberto chronology
João Gilberto (1973)	The Best of Two Worlds (1975)	Getz/Gilberto '76 (1976)

The Best of Two Worlds was released by Columbia Records in 1976 to feature Stan Getz in a reunion with João Gilberto. Their previous collaboration was a decade earlier on Getz/Gilberto Vol. 2. Heloisa Buarque de Hollanda (Miúcha), who had previously been married to João Gilberto, sang the English vocals.

== Reception ==
Professional ratings
Review scores
Source	Rating
AllMusic	4/5 stars
The Penguin Guide to Jazz Recordings	2/4 stars
The Rolling Stone Jazz Record Guide	3/5 stars

The AllMusic review by Thom Jurek stated: "In all, this is as fine a bossa album as Getz ever recorded, standing among his finest works, and without a doubt equals his earlier collaborations with Jobim and Gilberto".

== Track listing ==
#	Title	Writer(s)	Length
1.	"Double Rainbow"	Antônio Carlos Jobim, Gene Lees	3:31
2.	"Águas de Março"	Antônio Carlos Jobim	4:40
3.	"Lígia"	Antônio Carlos Jobim	5:20
4.	"Falsa Baiana"	Geraldo Pereira	5:01
5.	"Retrato em Branco e Preto"	Antônio Carlos Jobim, Chico Buarque	4:03
6.	"Izaura"	Herivelto Martins, Roberto Roberti	4:35
7.	"Eu Vim da Bahia"	Gilberto Gil	3:53
8.	"João Marcello"	João Gilberto	3:23
9.	"É Preciso Perdoar"	Alcivando Luz, Carlos Coqueijo Costa	5:13
10.	"Just One of Those Things"	Cole Porter	3:02

== Personnel ==
- Stan Getz - tenor saxophone
- Albert Dailey - piano
- Clint Houston or Steve Swallow - bass
- Billy Hart or Grady Tate - drums
- Airto Moreira, Reuben Bassini, Ray Armando, João Gilberto, Sonny Carr - percussion
- Heloisa (Miúcha) Buarque de Hollanda - English vocals
- João Gilberto - Portuguese vocals, guitar
- Oscar Castro-Neves - guitar, musical arrangements

Production

- Produced by Stan Getz
- Executive producer Teo Macero
- Recording engineer Stan Tonkel

== Sources ==
Gridley, Mark. Jazz Styles: History and Analysis. 9th. NJ: Pearson Prentice Hall, Print.
