= João Gilberto (album) =

Studio album by João Gilberto
- Released: 1973
- Studios: Rachel Elkind's studio, Upper West-side, New York City
- Genre: Bossa nova
- Length: 49:30
- Label: Polydor
- Producer: Rachel Elkind

João Gilberto chronology
João Gilberto en México (1970)	João Gilberto (1973)	The Best of Two Worlds (1976)

Professional ratings
Review scores
Source	Rating
AllMusic	4.5/5 stars

João Gilberto is a bossa nova album by João Gilberto, originally released in Brazil as a vinyl LP in 1973 and reissued on CD in 1988. João Gilberto released another album named João Gilberto in 1961, as well as several EPs with only his name as title. In 2007 it was listed by Rolling Stone Brazil as 47th of the 100 best Brazilian albums in history.

== Recording process ==
Wendy Carlos has stated that the album was recorded in producer Rachel Elkind's converted brownstone recording studio in New York City's Upper-west side. Carlos described when working with Gilberto during the recording process he possessed, "such control I needed only to position the microphones with care, and set levels once, then let him go". Microphones were placed very close for an intimate sound, "knowing he'd keep it all in perfect balance and consistency, no false sounds or bumping into microphones mere inches away", and that his vocals and guitar were recorded all at once, with percussion parts "more often recorded along with him, not overdubbed."

== Track listing ==
No.	Title	Writer(s)	Length
1.	"Águas de Março"	Tom Jobim	5:23
2.	"Undiú"	João Gilberto	6:37
3.	"Na Baixa do Sapateiro"	Ary Barroso	4:43
4.	"Avarandado"	Caetano Veloso	4:29
5.	"Falsa Baiana"	Geraldo Pereira	3:45
6.	"Eu Quero um Samba"	Janet de Almeida, Haroldo Barbosa	4:46
7.	"Eu Vim da Bahia"	Gilberto Gil	5:52
8.	"Valsa (Como são Lindos os Youguis) (Bebel)"	João Gilberto	3:19
9.	"É Preciso Perdoar"	Carlos Coqueijo, Alcivando Luz	5:08
10.	"Izaura"	Herivelto Martins, Roberto Roberti	5:28

== Personnel ==
- João Gilberto – vocals, classical guitar
- Sonny Carr – percussion
- Miúcha – vocals (on "Izaura")

Production

- Rachel Elkind – producer
- Wendy Carlos – engineer
