= Jazz 'n' Samba =

Studio album by Milt Jackson
- Released: 1964
- Recorded: August 6–7, 1964
- Studio: Van Gelder Studio, Englewood Cliffs, NJ
- Genre: Jazz
- Length: 33:31
- Label: Impulse!
- Producer: Bob Thiele

Milt Jackson chronology
Collaboration (1964)	Jazz 'n' Samba (1964)	I/We Had a Ball (1965)

Jazz 'n' Samba is an album by American jazz vibraphonist Milt Jackson featuring performances recorded in 1964 for the Impulse! label.

== Reception ==
The Allmusic review by Scott Yanow stated "This is an odd LP. The first session is a conventional one... The flip side substitutes two guitars for Flanagan's piano and uses bossa nova rhythms in hopes of getting a hit".

== Track listing ==
All compositions by Milt Jackson except as indicated

1. "Blues for Juanita" - 5:44
2. "I Got It Bad (And That Ain't Good)" (Duke Ellington, Paul Francis Webster) - 2:42
3. "Big George" - 4:49
4. "Gingerbread Boy" (Jimmy Heath) - 3:46
5. "Jazz 'n' Samba" (Antonio Carlos Jobim, Vinícius de Moraes, Norman Gimbel) - 2:14
6. "The Oo-Oo Bossa Nova" (Manny Albam) - 3:08
7. "I Love You" (Cole Porter) - 4:39
8. "Kiss and Run" (Rene Dononcin, William Engvick, Jack Ledru, Ella Fitzgerald) - 3:28
9. "Jazz Bossa Nova" - 3:01

- Recorded at Rudy Van Gelder Studio in Englewood Cliffs, New Jersey on August 6, 1964 (tracks 1–4) and August 7, 1964 (tracks 5–9)

== Personnel ==
- Milt Jackson – vibes
- Jimmy Heath – tenor saxophone (tracks 1, 3–6, 8 & 9)
- Howard Collins, Barry Galbraith – guitar (tracks 5–9)
- Tommy Flanagan – piano (tracks 1–4)
- Richard Davis – bass
- Connie Kay – drums
- Joe E. Ross (track 6), Lillian Clark (tracks 5 and 8) – vocals
