= Getz/Gilberto Vol. 2 =

Getz/Gilberto #2

Live album by Stan Getz and João Gilberto
- Released: April 1966
- Recorded: October 9, 1964
- Venue: Carnegie Hall, New York City
- Genre: Jazz, bossa nova
- Length: 63:38
- Label: Verve
- Producer: Creed Taylor

Stan Getz and João Gilberto chronology
Getz/Gilberto (1964)	Getz/Gilberto #2 (1966)	João Gilberto en México (1970)

Professional ratings
Review scores
Source	Rating
AllMusic	4/5 stars
DownBeat	3/5 stars

Getz/Gilberto #2 is a live album by Stan Getz and João Gilberto, released in 1966. It was recorded at a live concert at Carnegie Hall in October 1964. The previous album Getz/Gilberto won the 1965 Grammy Awards for Best Album of the Year and Best Jazz Instrumental Album - Individual or Group, among others. The painting on the cover is by Olga Albizu.

== Track listing ==
1. "Grandfather's Waltz" (Lasse Farnlof, Gene Lees) – 4:58
2. "Tonight I Shall Sleep (With a Smile on My Face)" (Duke Ellington, Irving Gordon) – 2:46
3. "Stan's Blues" (Gigi Gryce) – 4:46
4. "Here's That Rainy Day" (Johnny Burke, Jimmy Van Heusen) – 4:02
5. "Samba da Minha Terra" (Dorival Caymmi) – 3:09
6. "Rosa Morena" (Dorival Caymmi) – 4:05
7. "Um Abraço No Bonfá" (João Gilberto) – 2:51
8. "Bim Bom" (João Gilberto) – 2:10
9. "Meditation" (Norman Gimbel, Antonio Carlos Jobim, Newton Mendonça) – 3:56
10. "O Pato (The Duck)" (Jon Hendricks, Jayme Silva, Neuza Teixeira) – 2:22
11. "It Might as Well Be Spring" (Oscar Hammerstein II, Richard Rodgers) – 5:53
12. "Only Trust Your Heart" (Sammy Cahn, Benny Carter) – 5:50
13. "Corcovado (Quiet Nights of Quiet Stars)" (Antonio Carlos Jobim, Lees) – 5:40
14. "Garota de Ipanema (The Girl from Ipanema)" (Vinicius de Moraes, Norman Gimbel, Antonio Carlos Jobim) – 7:39
15. "Eu E Vocé" (Vinicius de Moraes, Carlos Lyra) – 3:28

Tracks 11 to 15 are CD bonus tracks not included on the original LP release. Some editions incorrectly credit "Samba da Minha Terra" and "Rosa Morena" to Danilo Caymmi.

== Personnel ==
Tracks 1–4

- Stan Getz - tenor sax
- Gary Burton - vibraphone
- Gene Cherico - bass
- Joe Hunt - drums

Tracks 5–10

- João Gilberto - guitar, vocal
- Keter Betts - bass
- Helcio Milito - drums

Tracks 11–15

- Stan Getz - tenor sax
- João Gilberto - guitar, vocal
- Astrud Gilberto - vocal
- Gary Burton - vibraphone
- Gene Cherico - bass
- Joe Hunt - drums
