= Getz/Gilberto =

Studio album by Stan Getz and João Gilberto
- Released: March 1964
- Recorded: March 18–19, 1963
- Studios: A & R, New York City
- Genres: Jazz, bossa nova
- Length: 33:36
- Languages: English, Portuguese
- Label: Verve
- Producer: Creed Taylor

Stan Getz and João Gilberto chronology
Getz/Gilberto (1964)	Getz/Gilberto #2 (1964)

Singles from Getz/Gilberto
- 1. "The Girl from Ipanema" Released: May 1964

Getz/Gilberto is an album by American saxophonist Stan Getz and Brazilian singer and guitarist João Gilberto, featuring pianist and composer Antônio Carlos Jobim (Tom Jobim), who also composed many of the tracks. It was released in March 1964 by Verve Records. The album features the vocals of Astrud Gilberto on two tracks, "Garota de Ipanema" ("The Girl from Ipanema") and "Corcovado". The artwork was done by artist Olga Albizu. Getz/Gilberto is a jazz and bossa nova album and includes tracks such as "Desafinado", "Corcovado", and "Garota de Ipanema". The last received a Grammy Award for Record of the Year and started Astrud Gilberto's career. "Doralice" and "Para Machucar Meu Coração" strengthened Gilberto's and Jobim's respect for the tradition of pre-bossa nova samba.

Getz/Gilberto is considered the record that popularized bossa nova worldwide and is one of the best-selling jazz albums of all time, selling over one million copies. It was included in Rolling Stone's and Vibe's lists of the best albums of all time. Getz/Gilberto was widely acclaimed by music critics, who praised Gilberto's vocals and the album's bossa nova groove and minimalism. Getz/Gilberto received Grammy Awards for Best Jazz Instrumental Album, Individual or Group and Best Engineered Recording - Non-Classical; it also became the first non-American album to win Album of the Year, in 1965.

== Background ==
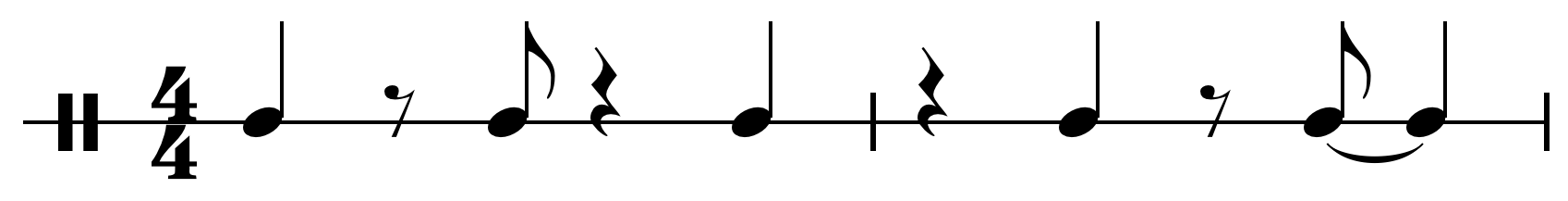
Bossa nova rhythm

Bossa nova was introduced in 1958, with the song "Chega de Saudade" ("No More Blues"), sung by Elizeth Cardoso on her album Canção do Amor Demais. Arranged by Jobim and Gilberto, with lyrics by Vinícius de Moraes, the song received both praise and criticism for rhythmic and harmonic elements that were uncommon for samba. Gilberto played acoustic guitar on another track, "Outra Vez", composed by Jobim. A few months later, Gilberto recorded his first single, "Chega de Saudade"/"Bim-Bom", the latter his composition. The single helped define música popular brasileira. This would lead to his debut album, Chega de Saudade (1959).

Jazz was suffering a commercial and artistic crisis due to the popularity of rock and roll. In 1961, Tony Bennett made a trip to Brazil with bassist Don Payne, and both became familiar with modern Brazilian popular music. Payne took home numerous Brazilian records when he returned to United States; he then showed them to his friend and neighbor Stan Getz. Getz was excited about the sound of bossa nova and released two albums: Jazz Samba and Big Band Bossa Nova, both in 1962. Bossa nova became so popular that the title Big Band Bossa Nova was used for three other 1962 albums: by Quincy Jones, Oscar Castro-Neves, and Enoch Light.

Jazz Samba with Charlie Byrd sold a million copies (Note: Getz's and Byrd's version of "Desafinado" stayed in the Billboard Hot 100 chart for 16 weeks.) and received positive reviews in United States. However, the record labels' rush to exploit the new Brazilian sound led to musicians introducing errors in melody and harmony in the music. For example, the sheet music of "Desafinado" as published in The New Real Book (1995)—a compilation of jazz and bossa nova songs—is the Charlie Byrd version from Jazz Samba, which contains many errors. There was a third Getz release, Jazz Samba Encore!, featuring Brazilian singer and guitarist Luiz Bonfá. The album sold well, (Note: Jazz Samba Encore! was placed in number 88 in the Billboard Hot 100 for 11 weeks—these three records competed with more popular albums; that explains why it is deemed a relative success.) but the "trilogy" did not satisfy the producers commercially to compete with Elvis Presley, Bobby Darin, Pat Boone, and Henry Mancini.

On November 21, 1962, the first North American concert of Bossa Nova – the New Brazilian Jazz – was presented at Carnegie Hall by João Gilberto, Tom Jobim, Bonfá, Roberto Menescal and Sérgio Mendes among others. According to critic Liliana Harb Bollos, the goal of this concert was to "spread música popular brasileira in the capital of jazz". By this time bossa nova had declined in Brazil, but continued to enjoy popularity in other countries. After the Carnegie Hall concert, record producer Creed Taylor wanted Jobim and Gilberto to meet Getz for a "historical documentation" of the genre's style. This happened in 1963 with Getz/Gilberto, released five years after the birth of bossa nova in Brazil.

== Recording and composition ==
The recording sessions commenced on March 18, 1963, at A & R Recording Studios in New York City and were completed on the following day. Phil Ramone, who owned A & R Recording Studios, was the album's sound engineer. Produced by Creed Taylor, the album was released by Verve Records. The rhythm section backing Getz was Jobim on piano, Sebastião Neto (pt) on bass and Milton Banana on drums. (Neto was not credited after being hired by another record label, Audio Fidelity. As a result, the double bassist credited on Getz/Gilberto is Tommy Williams, Getz's regular bassist. Williams, however, did not perform at the recording sessions.)

"The Girl from Ipanema"
Astrud Gilberto, along with João Gilberto and Stan Getz's "The Girl from Ipanema" from Getz/Gilberto

Astrud Gilberto, who had never sung professionally before, was featured on two tracks, "The Girl from Ipanema" and "Corcovado (Quiet Nights of Quiet Stars)". Like João Gilberto, Astrud Gilberto has a quiet, almost whispered vocal style that would become an important influence on female vocalists in bossa nova. On João Gilberto's first three albums—Chega de Saudade, O Amor, o Sorriso e a Flor (1960) and João Gilberto (1961)—the vibrato in his voice is not entirely absent as it is on Getz/Gilberto.

Stylistic features of bossa nova such as restraint and lyrical objectivity are further developed in Getz/Gilberto building on Gilberto's previous albums. Jobim's piano performance is minimalist, contributing only what is needed. Besides playing piano, Jobim was also responsible for some of the arrangements and co-wrote nearly all of the songs except "Doralice" and "Pra Machucar Meu Coração", both old sambas, which are more polished and serious in Gilberto's version. All the other songs are compositions by Jobim and Vinicius de Moraes ("The Girl from Ipanema", "Só Danço Samba" and "O Grande Amor") and Jobim and Newton Mendonça (in "Desafinado"). "Corcovado (Quiet Nights of Quiet Stars)" and "Vivo Sonhando" were composed solely by Jobim.

According to Ruy Castro, Gilberto and Getz often disagreed on which was the best take, leaving the choice to producer Creed Taylor. During one session, Gilberto, who did not speak English, and impatient with Getz's rhythmic style, told Antônio Carlos Jobim: "Tell this gringo he is an idiot". Jobim then translated: "Stan, João is saying that his dream always was to record with you". Getz's harder approach to the music did not please Gilberto who preferred a more delicate style. Due to these artistic differences, Getz/Gilberto #2 features Getz and his quartet on side A, and Gilberto, by himself, on side B. In spite of the tension in the studio Gilberto would continue to collaborate with Getz. Twelve years after the release of Getz/Gilberto the pair reunited at the Keystone Korner club in San Francisco for a six-day engagement promoting their new album, The Best of Two Worlds. (Note: After the shows promoting Getz/Gilberto, both reunited in the Keystone Korner club, in San Francisco for a six-day show promoting The Best of Two Worlds (1976).)

Gene Lees wrote the English lyrics for "Corcovado". Norman Gimbel, who wrote the English lyrics for "Garota de Ipanema", felt that the reference to "Ipanema" wouldn't mean anything to Americans but Jobim insisted on keeping the reference to the beach. (Note: Jobim himself told about the disagreement in the book O Cancioneiro Jobim: "The American version made me fight much with Norman Gimbel. The Americans refuse anything they don't understand, they don't know [...] All I wanted was to pass forward the spirit of the girl from Ipanema, this carioca and poetic thing. I think we did it, but it was a harsh fight.") Producer Taylor shelved the project for nearly a year because he was afraid the record might be a commercial failure. As a consequence, Getz/Gilberto was finally released in March 1964.

== Artwork ==
The artwork featured on the cover of the album is an acrylic painting by Puerto Rican artist Olga Albizu, called "Alla Africa". An abstract expressionist plastic artist, she also designed the covers of several other bossa nova albums by Getz.

Susan Noye Platt, art critic and historian, wrote about Albizu's relationship with bossa nova:

There is a controlled and subtle sensuality to her [Albizu's] work, that speaks of hidden layers of emotion, rather than letting everything appear on the surface to be consumed. In the case of Albizu, the connection to music, and particularly bossa nova, as well as her exposure to Hans Hofmann's ideas of "push and pull", allows for the work to exist without other reference points. The colors do indeed move like large full sounds, a connection that takes us all the way back to Kandinsky.

== Reception ==
Professional ratings
Review scores
Source	Rating
AllMusic	5/5 stars
The Penguin Guide to Jazz Recordings	4/4 stars
Pitchfork	9.6/10
The Rolling Stone Jazz Record Guide	4/5 stars

The album won the 1965 Grammy Awards for Best Album of the Year, Best Jazz Instrumental Album, Individual or Group and Best Engineered Recording - Non-Classical. "The Girl from Ipanema" also won the award for Record of the Year in 1965. This was the second time a jazz album received Album of the Year. The first time was The Music from Peter Gunn by Henry Mancini in 1959.

JazzTimes declared it, "essential for all serious jazz collections...served as proof that it is possible for music to be both artistically and commercially successful...this relatively sparse setting with the great Getz perfectly fit the music, resulting in a true gem." Vibe listed it as one of the 100 Essential Albums of the 20th Century. In 2012, Rolling Stone ranked the album number 447 on its list of The 500 Greatest Albums of All Time. It was listed by Rolling Stone Brazil as one of the 100 best Brazilian albums in history. The album was inducted into the Latin Grammy Hall of Fame in 2001.

The album was included in Robert Dimery's 1001 Albums You Must Hear Before You Die.

In 2014, a 50th anniversary expanded edition was released with the album in both stereo and mono, plus the two singles as bonus tracks.

== Track listing ==
Side one
No.	Title	Writer(s)	Length
1.	"The Girl from Ipanema"	Antônio Carlos Jobim; Vinicius de Moraes; Norman Gimbel	5:21
2.	"Doralice"	Antônio Almeida; Dorival Caymmi	2:47
3.	"Para Machucar Meu Coração"	Ary Barroso	5:07
4.	"Desafinado"	Jobim; Newton Mendonça	4:09

Side two
No.	Title	Writer(s)	Length
1.	"Corcovado (Quiet Nights of Quiet Stars)"	Jobim; Gene Lees	4:17
2.	"Só Danço Samba"	Jobim; Moraes	3:42
3.	"O Grande Amor"	Jobim; Moraes	5:27
4.	"Vivo Sonhando"	Jobim	2:56
Total length:			33:36

1997 reissue bonus tracks
No.	Title	Length
9.	"The Girl from Ipanema" (45 rpm version)	2:54
10.	"Corcovado (Quiet Nights of Quiet Stars)" (45 rpm version)	2:20
Total length:		39:00

== Personnel ==
- Stan Getz – tenor saxophone
- João Gilberto – guitar, vocals
- Antônio Carlos Jobim – piano
- Sebastião Neto – double bass
- Milton Banana – drums, pandeiro
- Astrud Gilberto – vocals on "The Girl from Ipanema", "Corcovado", "The Girl from Ipanema" (45 rpm issue) and "Corcovado" (45 rpm issue)

Reissues incorrectly list Tommy Williams as bassist.

== Charts ==
Chart performance for Getz/Gilberto
Chart (2002–2026)	Peak position
Belgian Albums (Ultratop Flanders)	73
Belgian Albums (Ultratop Wallonia)	56
French Albums (SNEP)	78
Norwegian Albums (VG-lista)	35
Portuguese Albums (AFP)	9
Swiss Albums (Schweizer Hitparade)	49

== Certifications ==
Region	Certification	Certified units/sales
Argentina (CAPIF)	Gold	30,000^{^}
Canada (Music Canada)	Gold	50,000^{^}
Italy (FIMI)	Gold	25,000^{‡}
United Kingdom (BPI) 2014 release	Silver	60,000^{‡}
United States (RIAA)	Gold	500,000^{^}
^{^} Shipments figures based on certification alone.^{‡} Sales+streaming figures based on certification alone.

== Footnotes ==
=== Bibliography ===
- Ariza, Adonay (2006). Electronic samba: a música brasileira no contexto das tendências internacionais (in Portuguese). Annablume.
- Blatter, Alfred (2007). Revisiting music theory: a guide to the practice. Taylor & Francis. ISBN 978-0-415-97440-0.
- Bollos, Liliana Harb (2005). "A bossa nova através da crítica musical: Renovação à custa de mal-estar". Sessões do Imaginário (in Portuguese). 10 (13): 56–61.
- Campos, A (1968). Balanço da Bossa – antologia crítica da moderna música popular brasileira (in Portuguese). São Paulo: Perspectiva.
- Castro, Ruy (1990). Chega de Saudade (in Portuguese) (3 ed.). São Paulo: Companhia das Letras.
- Cunha, Flávio Régis (2014). "Fluxos musicais do arranjador Claus Ogerman em contextos transacionais". Modus (in Portuguese). Vol. 9, no. 15.
- Debolt; Baugess (2011). Encyclopedia of the Sixties: A Decade of Culture and Counterculture: A Decade of Culture and Counterculture. ABC-CLIO.
- Dimery, Robert; Lydon, Michael (2010). 1001 Albums You Must Hear Before You Die: Revised and Updated Edition. Universe. ISBN 978-0-7893-2074-2.
- Fabris, Bernardo; Borém, Fausto (2006). Catita na leadsheet de K-Ximbinho e na interpretação de Zé Bodega... (in Portuguese). Belo Horizonte: Per Musi. pp. 5–28.
- Mello, Zuza Homem de [in Portuguese] (2001). João Gilberto (in Portuguese). São Paulo: Publifolha.
- Moon, Tom (2008). 1,000 Recordings to Hear Before You Die. Workman Publishing. ISBN 978-0-76-115385-6.
- Palmer, Richard (1988). Stan Getz. Apollo.
- Pianta, Carlo Machado (2010). A Gênese da Bossa Nova: João Gilberto e Tom Jobim (in Portuguese). Porto Alegre: Universidade Federal do Rio Grande do Sul.
- Scarabelot, André Luis (2005). "Música Brasileira e Jazz - O Outro Lado da História. Entrevistas com músicos jazzistas". Revista Digital Art&. Ano III (in Portuguese). No. 3.
- Simons, David (2004). Studio Stories – How the Great New York Records Were Made. San Francisco: Backbeat Books. ISBN 9781617745164.
- Swenson, J., ed. (1985). The Rolling Stone Jazz Record Guide. USA: Random House/Rolling Stone. p. 83. ISBN 0-394-72643-X.
- Wenner, Jann S., ed. (2012). "447- Stan Getz and Joao Gilberto, 'Getz/Gilberto'". Rolling Stone – Special Collectors Issue – The 500 Greatest Albums Of All Time. USA: Wenner Media Specials. ISBN 978-7-09-893419-6.
