= Amoroso (album) =

Studio album by João Gilberto
- Released: 1977
- Recorded: November 1976 - January 1977
- Studios: Rosebud, New York (November 17-19, 1976); Capitol, Hollywood (January 3-7, 1977)
- Genre: Bossa nova
- Length: 44:48; 72:51 (1993 CD Rerelease, combined with Brasil)
- Label: Warner Bros. (BS 3053)
- Producers: Helen Keane, Tommy LiPuma

João Gilberto chronology
| Getz/Gilberto '76 (1976) | Amoroso (1977) | João Gilberto Prado Pereira de Oliveira (1980) |

Professional ratings
Review scores
| Source | Rating |
|---|---|
| AllMusic | 5/5 stars |

Amoroso (Italian pronunciation: [amoˈroːzo]) is an album by João Gilberto, released in 1977. It is an album that uses an orchestral arrangement to produce the Brazilian sound of bossa nova. The album features Gilberto on vocals and guitar, backed by an string orchestra arranged and conducted by German arranger, Claus Ogerman. It was nominated for a Grammy Award for "Best Jazz Vocal Performance" at the 1978 Grammy awards.

Though the album is mostly in Portuguese, Amoroso also shows Gilberto recording in English for the first time, on his rendition of the George Gershwin jazz standard, "'S Wonderful". This marks a departure from Gilberto's earlier reluctance to sing in English as he didn't speak the language. He also sings in Italian ("Estate"), and Spanish ("Besame Mucho") on the album.

== Track listing ==
Side one
| No. | Title | Writer(s) | Length |
|---|---|---|---|
| 1. | "'S Wonderful" | George Gershwin; Ira Gershwin | 4:07 |
| 2. | "Estate" | Bruno Martino; Bruno Brighetti | 6:30 |
| 3. | "Tin Tin por Tin Tin" | Haroldo Barbosa; Geraldo Jaques | 3:37 |
| 4. | "Besame Mucho" | Consuelo Velázquez | 8:43 |

Side two
| No. | Title | Writer(s) | Length |
|---|---|---|---|
| 1. | "Wave" | Antonio Carlos Jobim | 4:35 |
| 2. | "Caminhos Cruzados" | Antonio Carlos Jobim; Newton Mendonça | 6:12 |
| 3. | "Triste" | Antonio Carlos Jobim | 3:35 |
| 4. | "Zingaro" | Antonio Carlos Jobim; Chico Buarque | 6:23 |
| Total length: | | | 43:42 |

The latter four songs were written and composed by fellow bossa nova legend Antônio Carlos Jobim and adapted by Gilberto. The string section was arranged by Claus Ogerman.

== CD Rerelease with "Brasil" ==
In 1993, the compact disc re-release of Amoroso is paired with Gilberto's 1981 album Brasil on a single disc, with the Amoroso cover and the titles of both albums.

== Personnel ==
Credits adapted from album liner notes. The individual members of the orchestra conducted by Claus Ogerman were left uncredited on the album liner notes.

Musicians

- João Gilberto - guitar, vocals
- Grady Tate - drums
- Joe Correro - drums
- Jim Hughart - bass
- Ralph Grierson - keyboards
- Claus Ogerman - arranger, conductor
- Israel Baker - concertmaster

Production

- Tommy LiPuma - producer
- Helen Keane - producer
- Al Schmitt - engineer, mixing
- Eric Bowman - assistant engineer (Rosebud Studios sessions)
- Don Henderson - assistant engineer (Capitol Records recording sessions)
- Frank DeCaro - orchestra contractor
- Noel Newbolt - production assistant

Design

- Hirosuke Doi - photography
- Ed Thrasher - art direction
- Richard Seireeni/Rod Dyer, Inc. - design
- Geoffrey Holder - cover painting
