= Jazz Samba Encore! =

Studio album by Stan Getz and Luiz Bonfá
- Released: April 1963
- Recorded: February 8, 9 & 27, 1963
- Studio: Webster Hall, New York City
- Genre: Jazz; bossa nova
- Length: 40:12
- Label: Verve; V6-8523
- Producer: Creed Taylor

Stan Getz chronology
Big Band Bossa Nova (1962)	Jazz Samba Encore! (1963)	Getz/Gilberto (1963)

Luiz Bonfá chronology
Caterina Valente e Luiz Bonfá (1963)	Jazz Samba Encore! (1963)	Recado Novo de Luiz Bonfá (1963)

Jazz Samba Encore! is a studio album by American saxophonist Stan Getz and Brazilian guitarist Luiz Bonfá, released by Verve Records in April 1963. The album's style is bossa nova in a slower groove. It contains a mix of Antônio Carlos Jobim standards as well as originals by Bonfá. Performers also include Jobim and vocalist Maria Helena Toledo, Bonfá's wife. The cover features an abstract expressionist painting by the New York-based Olga Albizu from Puerto Rico.

Professional ratings
Review scores
Source	Rating
AllMusic	4/5 stars
DownBeat	4/5 stars
New Record Mirror	1/5 stars
The Penguin Guide to Jazz Recordings	3.5/4 stars
The Rolling Stone Jazz Record Guide	3/5 stars

== Track listing ==
1. "Sambalero" (Luiz Bonfá) – 2:08
2. "Só Danço Samba (I Only Dance Samba)" (Antônio Carlos Jobim/Vinicius de Moraes) – 3:36
3. "Insensatez (How Insensitive)" (Jobim/de Moraes) – 3:21
4. "O Morro Não Tem Vez (Favela)" (Jobim/de Moraes) – 6:53
5. "Samba de Duas Notas (Two Note Samba)" (Luiz Bonfá) – 4:18 (in reference to Jobim's "One Note Samba")
6. "Menina Flor" (Bonfá/Maria Toledo) – 4:08
7. "Mania de Maria" (Bonfá/Maria Toledo) – 2:43
8. "Saudade Vem Correndo" (Bonfá/Maria Toledo) – 3:39
9. "Um Abração no Getz (A Tribute to Getz)" (Bonfá) – 4:23
10. "Ebony Samba" (Second Version) (Bonfá) – 4:33
11. "Ebony Samba" (First Version) (Bonfá) – 3:48 (bonus track on CD release)

== Personnel ==
- Stan Getz – tenor saxophone
- Luiz Bonfá – guitar
- Antônio Carlos Jobim – guitar (tracks 1, 2, 4, and 9), piano (track 3)
- Maria Toledo – vocals (tracks 1, 3, 5, 6, 8, 10, and 11)
- Tommy Williams (tracks 1–4, and 9), George Duvivier (tracks 2–4, and 9), Don Payne (tracks 5–8, 10, and 11) – bass
- Paulo Ferreira (tracks 5–7) – drums
- Jose Carlos (tracks 1–4, and 9), Dave Bailey (tracks 8, and 10) – drums, percussion

== In popular culture ==
The bridge of "Saudade Vem Correndo" is prominently sampled in the 1995 song "Runnin'" by hip-hop group The Pharcyde, from their album Labcabincalifornia. In turn, "Runnin'" is interpolated in the 2003 song "Fallen" by R&B singer Mýa, from her album Moodring. "Saudade Vem Correndo" is also sampled in the 2019 song "Make Believe" by rapper Juice Wrld, from his album Death Race for Love.

== Charts ==
=== Monthly charts ===
Monthly chart performance for Jazz Samba Encore!
Chart (2026)	Peak position
German Jazz Albums (Offizielle Top 100)	15
