= Chega de Saudade (album) =

Studio album by João Gilberto
- Released: April 14, 1959
- Recorded: 1959
- Genre: Bossa nova; samba; jazz
- Length: 22:37
- Label: Odeon
- Producer: Antônio Carlos Jobim

João Gilberto chronology
Chega de Saudade (1959)	O Amor, o Sorriso e a Flor (1960)

Professional ratings
Review scores
Source	Rating
AllMusic	4.5/5 stars

Chega de Saudade (Brazilian Portuguese: [ˈʃeɡɐ dʒi sawˈdadʒi]) is the debut album by Brazilian musician João Gilberto and is often credited as the first bossa nova album. The title can be translated roughly as "enough with longing", though the Portuguese word saudade carries with it more complex meaning. The album continues to receive high critical praise in the 21st century (see accolades below).

== Critical reception and legacy ==
By the time of the album's release, newspaper O Estado de S. Paulo stated that Gilberto "is one of the most musical of our popular singers, a certainty which broadly compensates for his lack of volume. In this regard, it is worth noting his interpretation of 'Desafinado'. Besides, he reveals an unorthodox good taste for the choice of melodies recorded in this first LP and a sobriety in interpretation we have rarely observed".

In 2001, the album was inducted into the Grammy Hall of Fame. In the same year, it was made an inaugural member of the Latin Grammy Hall of Fame.

In 2002 it was ranked third in Discoteca Básica's List of the 500 Greatest Brazilian Records, chosen by 162 Brazilian music experts.

In 2007 it was listed by Rolling Stone Brazil as the fourth best Brazilian album in history.

In 2024 Los 600 de Latinoamérica, a ranking created by several Latin American music journalists covering the years 1920 to 2022, Chega de Saudade was ranked seventh.

== Track listing ==
Side one
No.	Title	Writer(s)	Length
1.	"Chega de Saudade"	Jobim and Vinícius de Moraes	2:01
2.	"Lôbo Bôbo"	Carlos Lyra and Ronaldo Bôscoli	1:20
3.	"Brigas, Nunca Mais"	Jobim and Moraes	2:05
4.	"Hô-Bá-Lá-Lá"	Gilberto	2:15
5.	"Saudade Fêz Um Samba"	Lyra and Bôscoli	2:01
6.	"Maria Ninguém"	Lyra	2:21

Side two
No.	Title	Writer(s)	Length
7.	"Desafinado"	Jobim and Newton Mendonça	1:58
8.	"Rosa Morena"	Dorival Caymmi	2:04
9.	"Morena Boca de Ouro"	Ary Barroso	1:58
10.	"Bim-Bom"	Gilberto	1:16
11.	"Aos Pés da Cruz"	Marino Pinto and Zé da Zilda	1:34
12.	"É Luxo Só"	Barroso and Luiz Peixoto	1:56
