= Brigitte Bardot Sings =

Studio album by Brigitte Bardot
- Released: 1963
- Genre: Pop
- Length: 29:27
- Label: Phillips

Brigitte Bardot chronology
And God Created Woman (1956)	Brigitte Bardot Sings (1963)	B.B. (1964)

Brigitte Bardot Sings (titled only Brigitte Bardot in France and other countries) is the debut studio album by French singer and actress Brigitte Bardot. Released in 1963, under Philips (catalog number PCC 604), the album features a collection of French-language songs and was presented in a double-fold package including extra pages with photographs and lyrics.

The album is musically directed by Claude Bolling and showcases a variety of musical styles. It includes the song "L'Appareil à sous", which was written by Serge Gainsbourg.

== Background and content ==
Brigitte Bardot began recording music in the early 1960s while maintaining an active film career. Her early musical projects included collaborations with French songwriters such as Serge Gainsbourg, Jean-Max Rivière, and Gérard Bourgeois. Although she did not have formal vocal training, Bardot participated in a variety of recordings during this period.

The album includes a selection of tracks that reflect Bardot's public persona and the theatrical flair associated with French popular music of the time. Several songs, such as "El cuchipe", "C'est rigolo", and "Noir et Blanc", highlight a lively, high-powered performance style. While most of the tracks are in French, the album also includes a song sung in heavily accented English ("Everybody Loves My Baby").

== Singles ==
The single "La Madrague" / "C'est rigolo" peaked at number 13 on Salut les copains France magazine chart. The single "La Madrague" / "L'Appareil à sous" entered the Belgian Ultratop 50 Singles Chart (Wallonia) on May 1, 1963, debuting at position 44, and remained on the chart for 20 weeks, with its final appearance on September 1, 1963, still holding at 44. Its peak position was No. 17, where it stayed for one week.

== Critical reception ==
Professional ratings
Review scores
Source	Rating
AllMusic	3.5/5 stars
Revista do Rádio	3.5/5

Billboard highlighted the album as a "Pop Special Merit", noting its attractive packaging and potential appeal to fans of the French film star. Cash Box praised Bardot's energetic and "zestful" singing style, calling the album an impressive outing. The review suggested that Bardot's musical approach aligned with her film persona and anticipated the album would perform well commercially due to its teen-oriented content and appealing cover design.

The critic from Brazilian magazine Revista do Rádio wrote that while Bardot "is not a singer and never will be (at least not a good one)", her distinctive vocal style might still appeal to some listeners. He singled out "La madrague" and "Les amis de la musique" as the standout tracks, dismissing the rest as merely "okay".

Richie Unterberger of AllMusic wrote that the album was a "spirited but erratic endeavor", characterized by uneven material and arrangements. Bardot's singing was described as limited, but her delivery focused more on projecting personality and charm than technical skill. The review notes a theatrical quality in the songs, linked to vaudeville-cabaret traditions, and highlights the contributions of writers such as Jean-Max Rivière, Gérard Bourgeois, and Serge Gainsbourg. Tracks like "L'appareil à sous" and "La Madrague" were singled out as stronger moments.

== Track listing ==
No.	Title	Writer(s)	Length
1.	"L'Appareil à sous"	Serge Gainsbourg	1:28
2.	"Les Amis de la musique"	J.-M. Rivière, Y. Spanos, C. Bolling	2:56
3.	"El cuchipe"	Ismael Orozco, Carlos Ramirez, Roberto Cesari, Fernand Bonifay, Roland Gerbeau; participação: Narcisso Debourg, Pedro Serrano	2:57
4.	"Je me donne à qui me plaît"	Serge Gainsbourg	1:59
5.	"Invitango"	C. Bolling, J.-M. Rivière	2:33
6.	"C'est rigolo"	G. Bourgeois, J.-M. Rivière	2:52
7.	"La Madrague"	G. Bourgeois, J.-M. Rivière	2:35
8.	"Nothing More"	L. Klein	2:36
9.	"Everybody Loves My Baby"	J. Palmer, Spencer Williams	2:12
10.	"Rose d'eau"	J.-M. Rivière, Y. Spanos, C. Bolling	2:07
11.	"Noir et Blanc"	C. Bolling, J.-M. Rivière	1:45
12.	"Faite pour dormir"	C. Bolling, J.-M. Rivière	3:27

== Personnel ==
Credits adapted from the liner notes of Brigitte Bardot.

- Conductor – Claude Bolling
- Orchestra – Claude Bolling Et Son Orchestre (tracks: A1, A2, A4 to B1, B3 to B6),
  François Rauber Et Son Orchestre (tracks: B2),
  Los Colombianos (tracks: A3)
- Producer – Claude Dejacques
- Recording – Roger Roche

Visual

- Cover – Ghislain Dussart
- Design – Robert Laplace
- Photography – Ghislain Dussart, Stan Wiezniak
