= Big Band Bossa Nova (Stan Getz album) =

Studio album by Stan Getz
- Released: End of October 1962
- Recorded: August 27–28, 1962; CBS 30th Street Studio, New York City
- Genre: Bossa nova, jazz, cool jazz
- Length: 33:30
- Label: Verve; V6-8494
- Producer: Creed Taylor

Stan Getz chronology
Jazz Samba (1962)	Big Band Bossa Nova (1962)	Jazz Samba Encore! (1963)

Big Band Bossa Nova is a 1962 album by saxophonist Stan Getz with the Gary McFarland Orchestra. The album was arranged and conducted by Gary McFarland and produced by Creed Taylor for Verve Records. This was Getz's second bossa nova album for Verve following Jazz Samba, his very successful collaboration with guitarist Charlie Byrd.

The music was recorded at the CBS 30th Street Studio in New York City on August 27 and 28, 1962.

== Music ==
The music for the album consists of four songs by Brazilian composers and four original compositions by McFarland. The instrumentation chosen by McFarland eschews the traditional big band format of eight brass and five saxophones for a smaller ensemble featuring four woodwinds and French horn as well as three trumpets and two trombones. The four piece rhythm section is augmented by two percussionists.

McFarland freely mixes his instrumental colors to provide a constantly shifting palette in support of Getz's tenor. Jim Hall, Hank Jones, Doc Severinsen and Bob Brookmeyer are each featured in short solos.

== Reception ==
Professional ratings
Review scores
Source	Rating
AllMusic	4/5 stars
DownBeat	5/5 stars
The Penguin Guide to Jazz Recordings	3/4 stars

Although not reaching the chart heights of its predecessor, the album performed respectably on the charts. On the Billboard Top LP chart, it reached position No. 13, staying on for 23 weeks.

Noted jazz critic Don DeMichael, writing in the December 6, 1962, issue of DownBeat, awarded the album the top rating of five stars. He said: "Getz' melodic gift was never more evident; even the way he plays "straight" melody is masterful. Few jazzmen have had this gift... and it has to do with singing by means of an instrument, for Getz doesn't just play a solo, he sings it, as can be heard on any of these tracks, most evidently on Triste and Saudade."

About the writing DeMichael says: "McFarland shares in the artistic success of the album. His writing is peerless... he knows the proper combination of instruments to achieve certain sounds and he has the taste not to use all the instruments at hand all the time. His sparing use of the ensemble allows the beauty of the soloist and the material to shine through".

== Track listing ==
1. "Manhã de Carnaval" (Morning of the Carnival) (Luiz Bonfá) – 5:48
2. "Balanço no Samba" (Street Dance) (Gary McFarland) – 2:59
3. "Melancólico" (Melancholy) (Gary McFarland) – 4:42
4. "Entre Amigos" (Sympathy Between Friends) (Gary McFarland) – 2:58
5. "Chega de Saudade" (No More Blues) (Antônio Carlos Jobim, Vinícius de Moraes) – 4:10
6. "Noite Triste" (Night Sadness) (Gary McFarland) – 4:56
7. "Samba de Uma Nota Só" (One Note Samba) (Antônio Carlos Jobim, Newton Mendonça) – 3:25
8. "Bim Bom" (João Gilberto) – 4:31

== Personnel ==
- Stan Getz - tenor saxophone
- Doc Severinsen, Bernie Glow or Joe Ferrante and Clark Terry or Nick Travis - trumpet
- Ray Alonge - French horn
- Bob Brookmeyer or Willie Dennis - trombone
- Tony Studd - bass trombone
- Gerald Sanfino or Ray Beckenstein - flute
- Ed Caine - alto flute
- Ray Beckenstein and/or Babe Clark and/or Walt Levinsky - clarinet
- Romeo Penque - bass clarinet
- Jim Hall - unamplified guitar
- Hank Jones - piano
- Tommy Williams - bass
- Johnny Rae - drums
- José Paulo - tambourine
- Carmen Costa - cabasa
- Gary McFarland - arranger, conductor

Production

- Produced by Creed Taylor
- Engineered by George Kneurr and Frank Laico
