= And God Created Woman (soundtrack) =

Et Dieu... créa la femme

Soundtrack album by Brigitte Bardot
- Released: 1956 or 1957
- Label: Versailles

Brigitte Bardot chronology
And God Created Woman (1958)	Brigitte Bardot Sings (1963)

Et Dieu... créa la femme is an album credited to French actress Brigitte Bardot and containing music based on the soundtrack of her 1956 film And God Created Woman, with her added narration. The music was composed by Paul Misraki and arranged by Paul Misraki and Bill Byers.

The album was released in France on the Versailles record label and advertised as Bardot's "first microgroove record". The liner notes read: "On this disk (her first disk), Brigitte Bardot herself narrates you the story of the film in the musical ambiance of the original soundtrack".

In the United States and the UK, the album was released by Decca Records and titled And God Created Woman.

== Critical reception ==
Professional ratings
Review scores
Source	Rating
Billboard	(moderate sales potential)

Cash Box wrote that the album contained "beautiful music" and a "score [that] offers many different moods and is strikingly rendered under the direction of R. Vadim". Billboard wrote that Brigitte Bardot in her one song "proves more than competent as a singer in the Gallic style". HiFi/Stereo Review wrote that "the Paul Misraki score is a pleasantly sunny, Gallic affair" that "uses Latin rhythms to build up to a torrid climax".

== Track listings ==
et Dieu... créa la femme – 10-inch LP (Versailles – STD 2012, France)

Side A
No.	Title	Length
1.	"et Dieu... créa la femme"

Side B
No.	Title	Length
1.	"et Dieu... créa la femme"

And God Created Woman – 10-inch LP (Decca – DL 8685, US and UK)

Side A
No.	Title	Length
1.	"And God Created Woman" (Part 1)	15:00

Side B
No.	Title	Length
1.	"And God Created Woman" (Concluded)	16:11

== 2007 CD edition ==
Professional ratings
Review scores
Source	Rating
AllMusic	3.5/5 stars
Mojo	3/5 stars

All music is composed by Paul Misraki.

...And God Created Woman – CD (Él – ACMEM98CD, UK)
No.	Title	Note(s)	Length
1.	"...And God Created Woman" (Part 1)	Narration: Brigitte Bardot	15:08
2.	"...And God Created Woman" (Part 2)	Narration: Brigitte Bardot	16:20
3.	"Et Dieu créa la femme"		4:04
4.	"Yacht Melody"		1:56
5.	"Fievre tropicale"		1:24
6.	"Jazz Party"		1:50
7.	"Dis-moi quelque chose de gentil" (version slow)		1:44
8.	"Valse des rues"		1:25
9.	"No quiero sufrir"		1:41
10.	"Porque Nao?"		1:04
11.	"Dis-moi quelque chose de gentil" (version chantée)		2:31
12.	"La bistraille"		1:31
13.	"Robe du soir et smoking"		1:10
14.	"Juliette et Carradine"		1:01
15.	"BB cha-cha"		1:20
16.	"Tren-tren"		1:27
17.	"Scene d'amour"		0:59
18.	"Dis-moi quelque chose de gentil" (version orchestre)		2:29
19.	"Quand j'y pense"	Vocals: Sacha Distel	2:58
20.	Untitled		...

== 2016 CD edition ==
...And God Created Woman – CD (Soundtrack Factory – 606367, UK)
No.	Title	Note(s)	Length
1.	"...And God Created Woman" (Suite Part 1)	Spoken narration: Brigitte Bardot	15:08
2.	"...And God Created Woman" (Suite Part 2)	Spoken narration: Brigitte Bardot	16:22
3.	"Et Dieu créa la femme"		4:06
4.	"Yacht Melody"		1:58
5.	"Fievre tropicale"		1:26
6.	"Jazz Party"		1:53
7.	"Dis-moi quelque chose de gentil" (slow version)		1:44
8.	"Valse des rues"		1:28
9.	"No quiero sufrir"		1:42
10.	"Porque Nao?"		1:06
11.	"Dis-moi quelque chose de gentil" (vocal version)		2:34
12.	"La bistraille"		1:32
13.	"Robe du soir et smoking"		1:12
14.	"Juliette et Carradine"		1:03
15.	"BB cha-cha"		1:23
16.	"Tren-tren"		1:28
17.	"Scene d'amour"		1:01
18.	"Dis-moi quelque chose de gentil" (orchestral version)		2:31
19.	"Quand j'y pense"	Vocals: Sacha Distel	3:00
20.	"La bride sur le cou"		3:12
21.	"Brigitte Strip Blues"		2:37
22.	"The Night That Heaven Fell"	Vocals: Tony Bennett	2:48
23.	"Brigitte"	Vocals: Sacha Distel	2:21
24.	"Leçon de danse"		2:31
25.	"Sidonie"	Vocals: Brigitte Bardot	2:52
