= Denis Brean =

Brazilian composter, journalist, broadcaster, and lyricist

- Born: Augusto Duarte Ribeiro; February 28, 1917; Campinas, São Paulo, Brazil
- Died: August 16, 1969 (aged 52); São Paulo, Brazil
- Occupations: Composer, lyricist, broadcaster and journalist

Augusto Duarte Ribeiro (Campinas, February 28, 1917 – São Paulo, August 16, 1969), better known by his pseudonym Denis Brean, was a Brazilian composer, journalist, broadcaster and lyricist. Born in 1917 in Campinas, São Paulo, Brazil, Brean was considered one of the best composers of his state. His first work was "Poesia da Uva", which won a local award and was quickly recorded by Ciro Monteiro. His first major hit, "Boogie-Woogie na Favela", was recorded in 1945 by Ciro Monteiro and later performed by other artists such as Zacarias and his Orquestra, Roberto Silva, and Anjos de Inferno. Brean also had success as a composer of Carnival marches, such as "Grande Caruso", recorded João Dias in 1952. Brean also composed "Conselho" and "Franqueza", first recorded by Nora Ney and Maysa and later re-recorded by various other artists.

He retired from his artistic career in 1960.
