= Carlos Lyra =

Brazilian singer and composer (1933–2023)

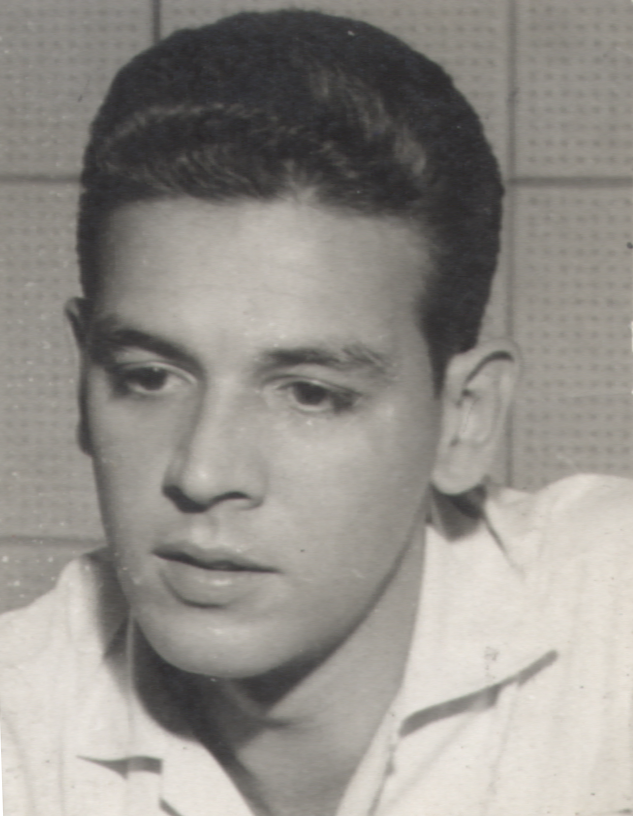

Background information
- Born: 11 May 1933; Rio de Janeiro, Brazil
- Died: 16 December 2023 (aged 90) Rio de Janeiro, Brazil
- Genre: Bossa nova
- Occupations: Singer; composer
- Instruments: Guitar; vocals
- Years active: 1954–2023

Carlos Eduardo Lyra Barbosa (11 May 1933 – 16 December 2023) was a Brazilian singer, and composer of numerous bossa nova and Música popular brasileira classics. He has also worked as a writer, with notable contributions to musical films such as Para Viver um Grande Amor and Intimidade. He and Antônio Carlos Jobim were the first two music composers, together with lyricists Vinicius de Moraes and Ronaldo Boscoli, to be recorded by João Gilberto on his first LP entitled Chega de Saudade (1959), which is referred to as the first generation of Bossa Nova.

== Career ==
The first of Lyra's songs to be recorded was "Menina" (1954), issued as a single by Sylvia Telles in 1955, with "Foi a noite" by Antônio Carlos Jobim on the B-side. The writers first met because of this single, when Jobim called Lyra "the other side of the record". At that time, both were writing their own music and lyrics creating a colloquial and completely new style. They wrote about their own experiences and feelings. A completely different lyrical style from most songs written at that time.

His first compositions (music and lyrics), from 1954 to 1956 included: "Quando chegares"; "Menina"; "Barquinho de Papel"; "Ciúme"; "Criticando" and "Maria Ninguém". In 1957 he started to compose together with the lyricist Ronaldo Bôscoli, songs such as "Lobo bobo", "Saudade fez um samba" and" Se é tarde me perdoa". In 1958 he wrote "Aruanda" and "Quem quiser encontrar o amor", with Geraldo Vandré. In 1960 he started to compose together with Vinicius de Moraes, songs such as "Você e eu"; "Coisa mais linda", Sabe você?", "Samba do Carioca"; "Maria Moita" and many others. They wrote together a musical play, in 1962, called "Pobre Menina Rica" (Poor little rich girl blue).

In 1961 he was one of the five founders of CPC (Center of Popular Culture) where he started to write songs for cinema and theater. He also wrote the song "Influência do Jazz", one of the songs he sang at the Bossa Nova Concert at Carnegie Hall, in 1962. This performance introduced bossa nova to American audiences, alongside other notable Brazilian artists like João Gilberto, Antônio Carlos Jobim, Sérgio Mendes, and Milton Banana.

Many of Bossa Nova's leading lights were either writers or performers; Lyra was one of the few who did both. Charismatic on stage, with a rich baritone voice, he captivated audiences throughout Brazil and, in the mid-1960s, in the United States, where he spent two years touring with saxophonist Stan Getz, the premier American exponent of bossa nova.

Lyra distinguished himself from his fellow bossa nova musicians by also engaging with politics. He was an outspoken leftist who joined the Communist Party and helped establish the People's Center for Culture, a space in Rio de Janeiro for progressive students and artists. He wrote songs about social and political issues, frequently coding his messages after the 1964 military coup in Brazil, which forced him into exile twice, first in Mexico City and then in Los Angeles.

== Personal life and death ==
Carlos Eduardo Lyra Barbosa was born May 11, 1933, in Rio de Janeiro. His mother, Helena (Lyra) Barbosa, was a homemaker, while his father, José Domingos Barbosa, was an officer in the Brazilian Navy.

Lyra was musically gifted and grew up in a family full of amateur artists and musicians. He learned classical guitar from Moacir Santos, an influential composer and music teacher, and began writing songs in his teens.

Lyra left Brazil after the 1964 coup and settled in Mexico City, where he met many other self-exiled Brazilian artists. He met and married Katherine Riddell, a Brazilian actress known by her stage name Kate Lyra. They eventually divorced. Along with his daughter, Mr. Lyra moved with his second wife, Magda Pereira Botafogo; his sister, Maria Helena Lyra Fialho; and his brother, Sérgio.

He returned to Brazil in the early 1970s before going into travels again in 1974, this time in Los Angeles. There, he received primal scream therapy from Arthur Janov and befriended another famous participant, John Lennon. Two years later, he returned to Brazil permanently, settling in Rio de Janeiro.

Carlos Lyra died in Rio de Janeiro on 16 December 2023, at the age of 90. His daughter, Kay Lyra, stated that he died of sepsis. Among the many celebrations surrounding his 90th birthday was the release of the album "Afeto: Homenagem Carlos Lyra (90 Anos)," which featured his songs performed by some of Brazil's most prominent musicians, including Gilberto Gil, Joyce Moreno, and Mônica Salmaso.

== Filmography ==
Year	Film	Music	Writer	Notes
1965	Crônica da Cidade Amada	Soundtrack (Aruanda)	No	Comedy Drama
1969	Patsy, Mi Amor	Composer	No	Romantic Drama
1975	Intimidade		Yes	Drama
1984	Para Viver um Grande Amor		Yes	Musical
