= João (album) =

Studio album by João Gilberto
- Released: July 23, 1991
- Genre: Bossa Nova
- Label: Polygram do Brazil Ltda.
- Producer: Mayrton Bahia

João is a 1991 album by João Gilberto.

== Reception ==
Allmusic awarded the album 4 stars.

Professional ratings
Review scores
Source	Rating
Allmusic	4/5 stars
The Philadelphia Inquirer	4/4

== Track listing ==
1. "Eu Sambo Mesmo" ("I Really Samba") (Janet Almeida)
2. "Siga" ("Go On") (Fernando Lobo, Helio Guimarães)
3. "Rosinha" ("Little Rose") (Jonas Silva)
4. "Málaga" (Fred Bongusto)
5. "Una Mujer" ("A Woman") (Paul Misraki, S. Pontal Riso, C. Olivare)
6. "Eu e Meu Coração ("My Heart and I") (Inaldo Vilarinho, Antonio Botelho)
7. "You Do Something to Me" (Cole Porter)
8. "Palpite Infeliz" ("Unhappy Remark") (Noel Rosa)
9. "Ave Maria no Morro" ("Ave Maria on the Hill") (Herivelto Martins)
10. "Sampa" (Caetano Veloso)
11. "Sorriu pra Mim" ("Smiled at Me") (Garoto, Luiz Claudio)
12. "Que Reste-t-il de Nos Amours" ("I Wish You Love") (Charles Trenet, Leon Chauliac)

== Personnel ==
- Joao Gilberto – voice, guitar
- Clare Fischer – keyboards, string and woodwind arrangements
- Jim Hughart – acoustic bass
- Joe Correro – drums
- Michito Sanchez – percussion
