= João Gilberto =

Brazilian musician (1931 – 2019)

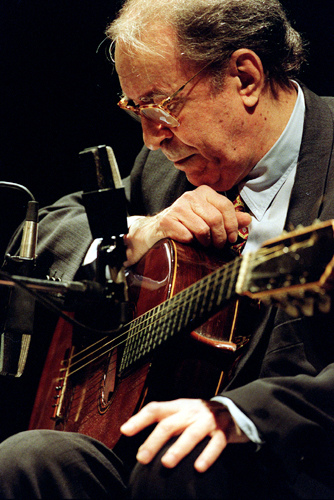
- Gilberto in 2006
- Born: João Gilberto do Prado Pereira de Oliveira; 10 June 1931; Juazeiro, Bahia, Brazil
- Died: 6 July 2019 (aged 88); Rio de Janeiro, Rio de Janeiro, Brazil
- Spouse: Astrud Gilberto (m. 1959; sep. 1964)
- Partner(s): Miúcha (1965–1971); Maria do Céu Harris (1984–2003; 2005–2019); Claudia Faissol (2003–2005)
- Children: 3, including Bebel
- Musical career
- Genres: Bossa nova; latin jazz; MPB; samba
- Occupations: Musician; composer
- Instruments: Guitar; vocals
- Years active: 1949–2008
- Labels: Columbia; Elektra/Musician; Epic; Odeon; Polydor; PolyGram; Resonance; UMG; Verve; Warner Bros.; WMG
- Formerly of: Enamorados do Ritmo; Garotos da Lua

João Gilberto do Prado Pereira de Oliveira (/ˈʒwaʊ ʒɪlˈbɛərtoʊ/, ZHWOWN zhil-BAIR-toh; Brazilian Portuguese: [ʒuˈɐ̃w ʒiwˈbɛʁtu du ˈpɾadu peˈɾejɾɐ dʒi oliˈvejɾɐ]; 10 June 1931 – 6 July 2019) was a Brazilian guitarist, singer, songwriter and composer who was a pioneer of the musical genre bossa nova in the late 1950s. Around the world, he was often called the "father of bossa nova"; in his native Brazil, he was referred to as "O Mito" (The Myth). In 1965, the album Getz/Gilberto was the first jazz record to win the Grammy Award for Album of the Year. It also won Best Jazz Instrumental Album – Individual or Group and Best Engineered Album, Non-Classical. Gilberto's Amoroso was nominated for a Grammy in 1978 in the category Best Jazz Vocal Performance. In 2001 he won in the Best World Music Album category with João voz e violão.

== Early life ==
João Gilberto was born in Juazeiro, Bahia, the son of Joviniano Domingos de Oliveira, a wealthy merchant, and Martinha do Prado Pereira de Oliveira. He lived in his native city until 1942, when he began to study in Aracaju, Sergipe, returning to Juazeiro in 1946. At the age of 14, Gilberto got his first guitar from his grandfather despite disapproval from Gilberto's father. Still in Juazeiro, he formed his first band, called "Enamorados do Ritmo". Gilberto moved to Salvador, Bahia, in 1947. During his three years in the city, he dropped out of his studies to dedicate himself exclusively to music and at the age of 18 began his artistic career as a crooner at the Rádio Sociedade da Bahia.

== Career ==
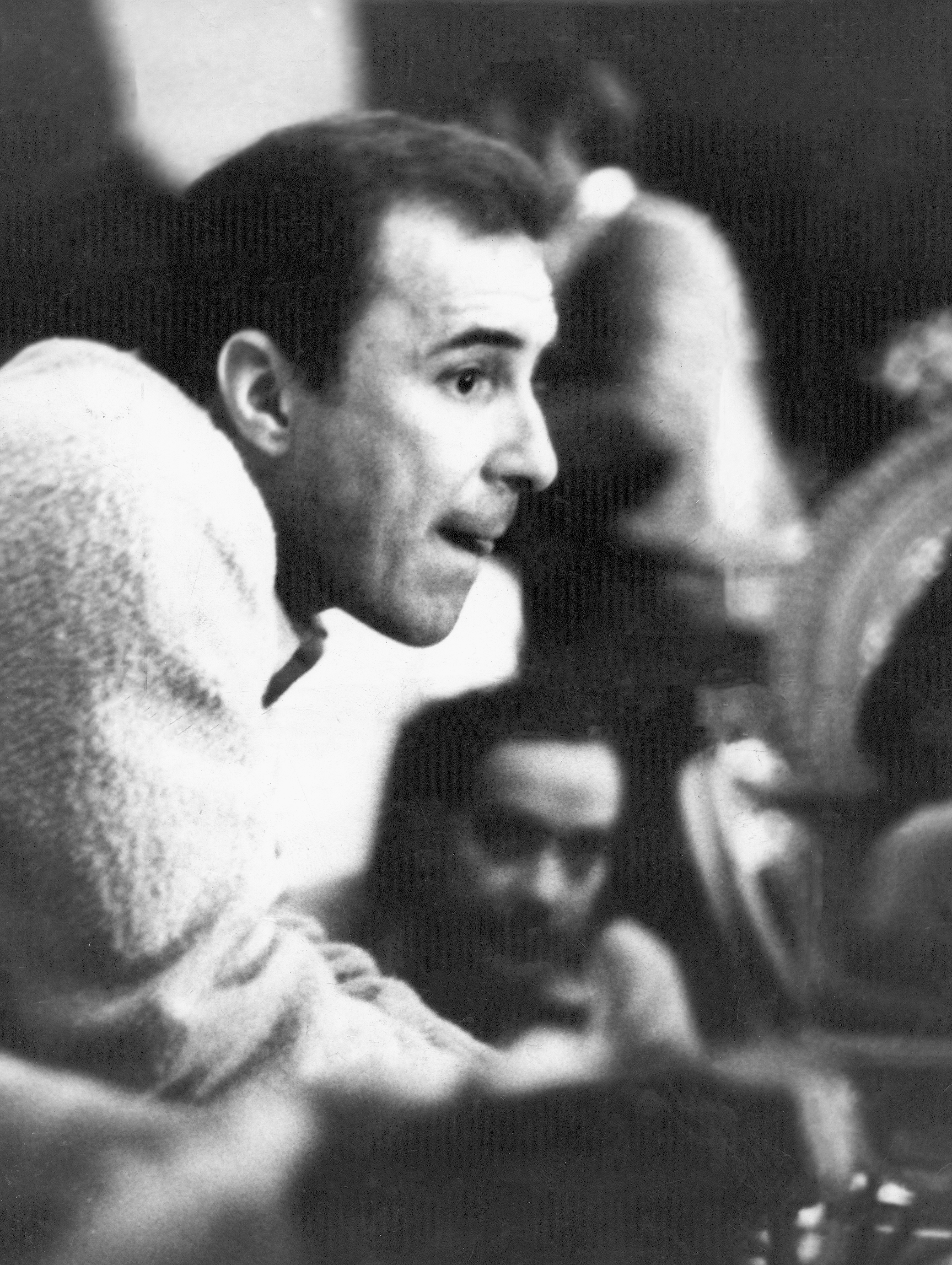
João Gilberto and Stan Getz in New York (1972).

Gilberto's first recordings were released in Brazil as two-song, 78 rpm singles between 1951 and 1959. In the 1960s Brazilian singles evolved to the "double compact" format, and Gilberto released some EPs in this new format, which carried four songs on a 45 rpm record. In 1956, he returned to Rio, having lived there some years from 1950 onward, and struck up old acquaintances, most significantly with Antônio Carlos Jobim, who was by then working as a composer, producer and arranger with Odeon Records. Jobim was impressed with Gilberto's new style of guitar playing and set about finding a suitable song to pitch the style to Odeon management.

In 1963, Gilberto collaborated with American jazz musician Stan Getz on the album Getz/Gilberto which was released the following year. Jobim played the piano for the album while Gilberto's then-wife Astrud performed the vocals in English while he sang in Portuguese. Although Astrud Gilberto was only in the recording studio to be with her husband, João Gilberto requested her to sing on several of the tracks as he could not sing in English. This resulted in a duet between the two on the track "The Girl from Ipanema" which became a major hit from the album. At the 7th Annual Grammy Awards, Getz/Gilberto won three awards including Album of the Year, which marked the first time a jazz album received the accolade.

Gilberto was known for his demanding acoustic and noise-control standards. During a recording session of the song "Rosa Morena", he insisted on 28 takes to get the pronunciation of the o in "Rosa" just right. Nonetheless, despite his high acoustic standards, he skipped a contractually required sound check prior to a July 2003 performance at the Hollywood Bowl, in Los Angeles. This negligence (and the ensuing sound fiasco) prompted the audience to stream from the venue before the concert ended. In 1997, Gilberto sued record label EMI over their reissue of several of his early works, which he contended had been poorly remastered. According to The New York Times, "A statement by his lawyer at the time declared that the reissues contained sound effects that 'did not pertain to the original recordings, banalizing the work of a great artist." Following the incident, EMI ceased production of the albums in question, and, as of 2008, the lawsuit has yet to reach a decision.

In 2001, Gilberto won the Grammy for the Best World Music Album category in the 43rd Annual Grammy Awards for his work in the album João Voz e Violão. A year later, he was inducted into the International Latin Music Hall of Fame.

In September 2003, Gilberto performed four shows in Japan. His performance at the Tokyo International Forum on 12 September was recorded for a live album titled In Tokyo which was released in 2004. At the 6th Annual Latin Grammy Awards in 2005, In Tokyo received a nomination for Best MPB Album. He performed at the JVC Jazz Festival in 2008. On 17 May 2017, Gilberto received an honorary doctorate in music from Columbia University but did not attend the commencement ceremony.

His posthumous album Relicário: João Gilberto (Ao Vivo no Sesc 1998) received an honorable mention by the Associação Paulista de Críticos de Arte in their list of the 50 best Brazilian albums of 2023.

=== Role in bossa nova ===
With the introduction of the microphone and the amplifier in Brazil, Gilberto realized that the sound source did not need to be emitted intensely, regarding the voice and instrument, which favored subtle and internalized interpretations. On the other hand, at the time of the first "bossa nova" recordings, Brazil still did not have high fidelity recording equipment capable of reproducing more complex sonorities. Due to that, Gilberto and Tom Jobim, Gilberto's first arranger, elaborated complex harmonies under the influence of American music, and at the same time they simplified the general sound, because of the equipment limitation.

In July 1958, Elizete Cardoso released the famous LP, Canção do Amor Demais, containing songs by Tom Jobim and Vinicius de Moraes. The record, however, would enter the history of Brazilian popular music for another reason: Gilberto accompanied Cardoso on guitar on the tracks "Chega de Saudade" and "Outra Vez", these being the first recordings of the so-called "bossa nova beat". In August of that year, Gilberto released a 78 rpm record containing "Chega de Saudade" and "Bim Bom", recorded at Odeon, with collaborations from Jobim, Dorival Caymmi and Aloysio de Oliveira. This record inaugurated the "bossa nova" genre and soon became a commercial success. Gilberto's recording had arrangements by Jobim and the participation of Milton Banana, among other artists. Gilberto innovated by using two microphones to record, one for the voice and one for the guitar. This way, the harmony became more clearly heard. Until then, songs were recorded with only one microphone, emphasizing the voice to the detriment of the guitar. With this innovation, voice and guitar could compete equally, if the voice maintained a natural intensity. Thus, it was necessary to issue the voice in a volume close to that of ordinary speech. With Gilberto, voice and guitar are kept at the same volume intensity, with the microphones picking up both sound sources equally, and, if required, changing the volume of both would be in equal proportion. In 1959, Gilberto released another 78 rpm, containing "Desafinado" by Jobim and Newton Mendonça, and "Hô-bá-lá-lá", written by himself. In March 1959, he released the LP Chega de Saudade, which became a sales success and had a major impact in the history of Brazilian music.

== Musical style ==
Gilberto's style combines traditional elements of samba with more contemporary jazz. His "unique" acoustic guitar style involves a syncopated rhythm of plucked chords, with chord progressions rooted in the jazz tradition. His vocal style has been described as "laid-back and understated". In 2023, Rolling Stone ranked Gilberto at number 81 on its list of the 200 Greatest Singers of All Time. Leonardo Rocha, in his obituary for the BBC, states that Gilberto's music describes "a period of huge optimism in Brazil".

== Personal life ==
Gilberto first married the singer Astrud Weinert, with whom he collaborated on the hit recording of "The Girl from Ipanema"; the couple had a son called João Marcelo. They divorced, and he later married the singer Miúcha (died 2018); they had only one daughter, Bebel Gilberto. They later separated. Gilberto also had a daughter with Claudia Faissol, a journalist. His daughter with Cláudia is the singer Loulu Gilberto.

Gilberto lived alone from around 2009. His final years were marked by money problems as well as declining health. In 2011, he was sued and evicted from an apartment in Leblon by his landlord, Countess Georgina Brandolini d'Adda. It was reported in December 2017 that his daughter Bebel was seeking control of his financial affairs because of his declining mental state and increasing indebtedness.

On 6 July 2019, Gilberto died at his apartment in Rio de Janeiro. His body was buried in the Cemetery Hill Park in Niterói following a private ceremony on 8 July 2019.

Writing in The Guardian after his death, Dom Phillips described Gilberto as ".. one of the country's greatest musicians and composers, a reclusive genius in a nation of extroverts whose work recalled happier, more optimistic times for a deeply divided nation." In The Washington Post pop critic Chris Richards said, "His voice was one of the most intimate sounds of the 20th century – more melodic than a sigh, more rhythmic than chitchat, only just barely. Every syllable that appeared on his lips carried an air of effortlessness, but Gilberto had worked hard to locate that sacred place where a human breath becomes music."

== Discography ==
Gilberto has released several studio and live albums:

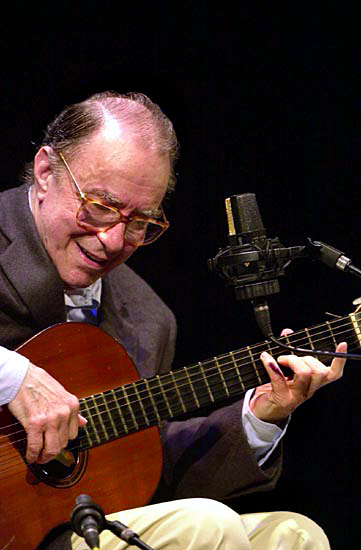
Gilberto in concert, 1996

- "Quando Você Recordar" // "Amar é Bom" (1951)
- "Anjo Cruel" // "Sem Ela" (1951)
- "Quando Ela Sai" // "Meia Luz" (1952)
- "Chega de Saudade" // ""Bim-Bom" (Odeon 14.360, 1958)
- "Desafinado" // "Hô-bá-lá-lá" (Odeon 14.426, 1958)
- "Lôbo Bôbo" // "Maria Ninguém" (Odeon 14.460, 1959)
- Cantando as Músicas do Film 'Orfeu do Carnaval' (Odeon, 1959) - 7-inch EP combining two 78 rpm singles, released in 1959: "A Felicidade" // "O Nosso Amor" (Odeon 14.491) and "Manhã de Carnaval" // "Frêvo" (Odeon 14.495).
- Chega de Saudade (Odeon, 1959)
- O Amor, o Sorriso e a Flor [AKA Brazil's Brilliant João Gilberto] (Odeon, 1960)
- João Gilberto (Odeon, 1961)
- Getz/Gilberto (with Stan Getz) (Verve, 1963 [1964])
- Bossa Nova at Carnegie Hall (Audio Fidelity, 1963)
- The Boss of Bossa Nova (Atlantic, 1963) reissue of João Gilberto
- The Warm World of João Gilberto (Atlantic, 1963) reissue of Chega de Saudade
- Gilberto and Jobim (Capitol, 1964) reissue of Brazil's Brilliant João Gilberto
- Getz/Gilberto Vol. 2 (with Stan Getz) (Verve, 1964 [1966])
- João Gilberto en México (Orfeon, 1970)
- João Gilberto (Polydor, 1973) - this release is often referred to as João Gilberto's "white album".
- The Best of Two Worlds (with Stan Getz) (Columbia, 1975 [1976])
- Amoroso (Warner Bros., 1977)
- Interpreta Tom Jobim (Odeon, 1978; reissued in 1985)
- João Gilberto Prado Pereira de Oliveira (Warner Bros., 1980)
- Brasil (with Caetano Veloso, Gilberto Gil and Maria Bethânia) (Warner Bros., 1981)
- Meditação (EMI, 1985)
- Live in Montreux (Elektra Musician, 1985 [1987])
- O Mito (EMI, 1988) - also released as The Legendary João Gilberto: The Original Bossa Nova Recordings (1958-1961) on World Pacific in 1990.
- Stan Getz Meets João & Astrud Gilberto: New York 1964 (Giants of Jazz, 1990)
- João (Philips, 1991)
- Eu Sei que Vou Te Amar (Epic, 1994)
- João Voz e Violão (Verve, 2000)
- Live at Umbria Jazz (EGEA [Italy], 2002)
- In Tokyo (Verve, 2003 [2004])
- Um Encontro No Au Bon Gourmet (with Tom Jobim, Vinicius De Moraes and Os Cariocas) (Doxy, 2015) - recorded live in 1962.
- Getz/Gilberto '76 [live] (Resonance, 2016)
- Relicário: João Gilberto Ao Vivo No Sesc (05 abr 1998) (Selo SESC SP, 2023) 2-CD

== Awards ==
Award	Year (Note: Indicates the year of ceremony. Each year is linked to the article about the awards held that year, wherever possible.)	Recipient or nominee	Category	Result	Ref.
Grammy Awards	1965	Getz/Gilberto	Album of the Year	Won	
Grammy Awards	1965	Getz/Gilberto	Best Engineered Album, Non-Classical	Won	
Grammy Awards	1965	Getz/Gilberto	Best Jazz Instrumental Album	Won	
Grammy Awards	2001	João voz e violão	Best World Music Album	Won	

== Sources ==
- Castro, Ruy (trans. by Lysa Salsbury). Bossa Nova: The Story of the Brazilian Music That Seduced the World. 2000. 1st English language edition. A Capella Books, an imprint of Chicago Review Press, Inc. ISBN 1-55652-409-9 First published in Brasil by Companhia das Letras. 1990.
- McGowan, Chris and Pessanha, Ricardo. The Brazilian Sound: Samba, Bossa Nova and the Popular Music of Brazil. 1998. 2nd edition. Temple University Press. ISBN 1-56639-545-3
- Gridley, Mark. Jazz Styles: History and Analysis. 9th. NJ: Pearson Prentice Hall, Print.
- De Stefano, Gildo, Il popolo del samba, La vicenda e i protagonisti della storia della musica popolare brasiliana, Preface by Chico Buarque de Hollanda, Introduction by Gianni Minà, RAI-ERI, Rome 2005, ISBN 8839713484
- De Stefano, Gildo, Saudade Bossa Nova: musiche, contaminazioni e ritmi del Brasile, Preface by Chico Buarque, Introduction by Gianni Minà, Logisma Editore, Florence 2017, ISBN 978-88-97530-88-6
