= Stan Getz =

American jazz saxophonist (1927–1991)

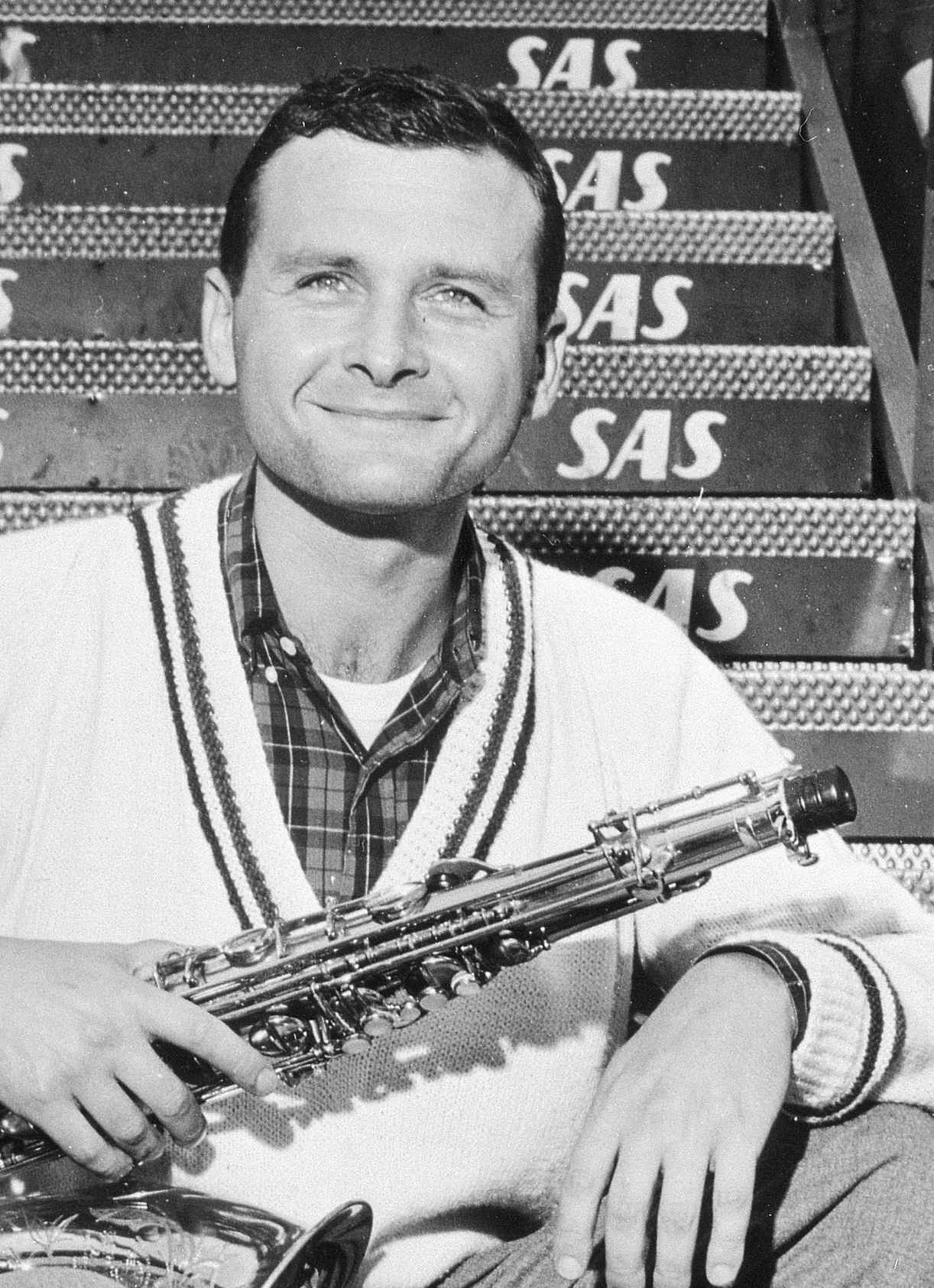
- Getz in 1958

Background information
- Born: Stanley Gayetski; February 2, 1927; Philadelphia, Pennsylvania, U.S.
- Died: June 6, 1991 (aged 64) Malibu, California, U.S.
- Genres: Cool jazz; bossa nova; bebop
- Instrument: Tenor saxophone
- Years active: 1943–1991
- Labels: Prestige; Verve; Columbia

Stan Getz (born Stanley Gayetski; February 2, 1927 – June 6, 1991) was an American jazz saxophonist. Playing primarily the tenor saxophone, Getz was known as "The Sound" because of his warm, lyrical tone, with his prime influence being the wispy, mellow timbre of his idol, Lester Young. Coming to prominence in the late 1940s with Woody Herman's big band, Getz is described by critic Scott Yanow as "one of the all-time great tenor saxophonists". Getz performed in bebop and cool jazz groups. Influenced by João Gilberto and Antônio Carlos Jobim, he also helped popularize bossa nova in the United States with the hit 1964 single "The Girl from Ipanema".

== Early life ==
Stan Getz was born Stanley Gayetski on February 2, 1927, at St. Vincent's Hospital in Philadelphia, Pennsylvania, United States. Getz's father, Alexander ("Al"), was born in Mile End, London, in 1904; his mother, Goldie (née Yampolsky), was born in Philadelphia in 1907. His paternal grandparents Harris and Beckie Gayetski were originally from Kyiv, Ukraine, but had emigrated to escape the anti-Jewish pogroms to Whitechapel, in the East End of London. While in England, they owned the Harris Tailor Shop at 52 Oxford Street for more than 13 years. In 1914, Harris and Beckie emigrated to the United States with their three sons Al, Phil, and Ben, following several siblings that had recently emigrated there. Getz's original family name, Gayetski, was changed to Getz upon arrival in America.

The Getz family initially settled in Philadelphia but moved to New York City during the Great Depression, seeking better employment opportunities. Getz worked diligently in school, achieving straight A's and finishing sixth grade near the top of his class. His main passion was musical instruments. He began playing various instruments, starting with a harmonica he received at the age of twelve. When he turned thirteen, his father bought him his first saxophone, a $35 alto saxophone. He quickly progressed to playing all types of saxophones and the clarinet. Still, he developed a passion for the tenor saxophone and began practicing for eight hours a day while studying with Bill Shiner, a well-known saxophone teacher in the Bronx. According to Getz, he only had about six months of lessons and never studied music theory or harmony.

Getz attended James Monroe High School in the Bronx. In 1941, he was accepted into the All-City High School Orchestra of New York City, which provided him with the opportunity to receive private, free tutoring from Simon Kovar, a bassoon player with the New York Philharmonic. During this time, he also played the saxophone at dances and bar mitzvahs. He eventually dropped out of school to pursue his musical career but was later sent back to the classroom by truancy officers of the school system.

== Career ==
=== Beginnings ===
In 1943, at the age of 16, he joined Jack Teagarden's band and, because of his youth, he became Teagarden's ward. Getz also played along with Nat King Cole and Lionel Hampton. A period based in Los Angeles with Stan Kenton was brief. Following a comment from Kenton that Getz's main influence, Lester Young, was too simple, Getz quit.

After performing with Jimmy Dorsey and Benny Goodman, Getz was a soloist with Woody Herman from 1947 to 1949 in the Second Herd, and he first gained wide attention as one of the band's saxophonists, who were known collectively as "The Four Brothers"; the others being Serge Chaloff, Zoot Sims, and Herbie Steward. With Herman, he had a hit with "Early Autumn" in 1948.

After leaving the Second Herd, Getz was able to launch his solo career. In 1950, he was a guest soloist with Horace Silver's trio at the Club Sundown in Hartford, Connecticut. He subsequently hired them for touring gigs, gaining Silver his earliest national exposure. For an unknown period, he didn't pay Silver, instead using the money due to the pianist to buy heroin. Silver finally left in June 1952. In the same period, Getz performed with pianists Al Haig and Duke Jordan and drummers Roy Haynes and Max Roach, as well as bassist Tommy Potter, all of whom had worked with Charlie Parker. Guitarists Jimmy Raney and Johnny Smith were also associated with the saxophonist in this period. Getz enhanced his profile with his featured performance on Johnny Smith's version of the song "Moonlight in Vermont", recorded in 1952, which became a hit single and stayed on the charts for months. A DownBeat readers' poll voted the single as the second best jazz record of 1952. The later album Moonlight in Vermont, reconfigured from two 10-inch LPs (RLP-410 and RLP-413) for a 12-inch release (LP-2211), was issued in 1956. By 1956, Ben Selvin, bandleader and record producer known as the "Dean of Recorded Music", featured Getz's recordings on national radio networks as part of the RCA Thesaurus transcriptions library.

In 1952, Getz signed with Norman Granz for his labels Clef and Norgran Records, which would be consolidated into Verve Records by 1956. A December 1953 date with Dizzy Gillespie found Getz also in the company of Oscar Peterson, Herb Ellis, Ray Brown, and Max Roach for Diz and Getz, released in 1955. Other notable Getz albums issued by Granz during this time include West Coast Jazz in 1955 and The Steamer in 1957. Getz moved to Copenhagen in 1958. Here, he performed with pianist Jan Johansson and bassist Oscar Pettiford, among others, at the Club Montmartre.

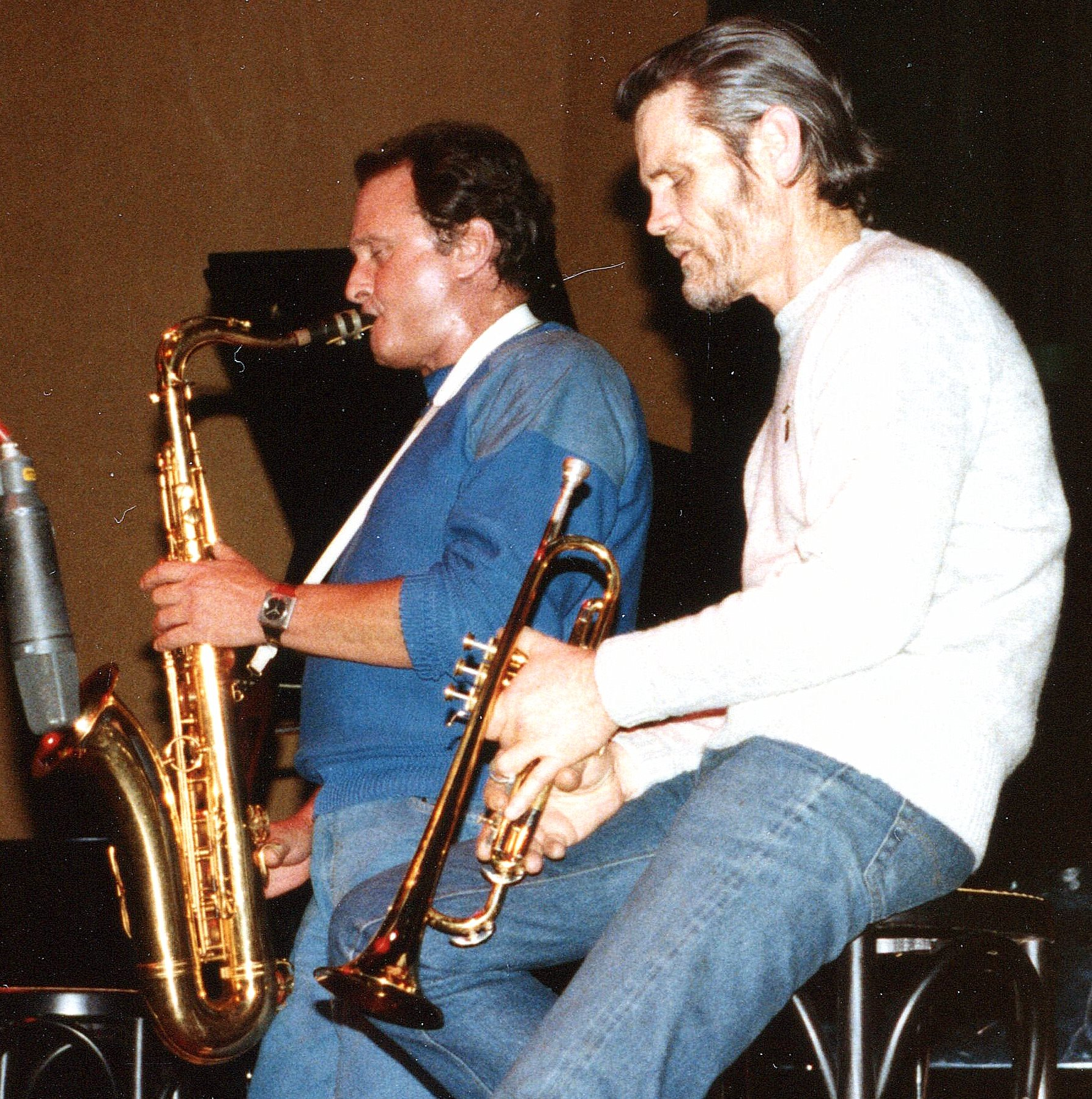
Getz and Chet Baker (right) in 1983

=== Return to United States ===
Returning to the U.S. from Europe in 1961, Getz recorded the album Focus with arrangements by Eddie Sauter, who created a strings backing for the saxophonist. In a March 2021 article for the All About Jazz website, Chris May wrote of it as "one of the great masterpieces of mid-twentieth century jazz" and compared it to the work of Béla Bartók.

Getz became involved in introducing bossa nova music to the American audience teaming with guitarist Charlie Byrd, who had just returned from a U.S. State Department tour of Brazil. In 1962, they recorded the album Jazz Samba featuring their cover of Antonio Carlos Jobim's "Desafinado" which became a hit and won Getz the Grammy for Best Jazz Performance of 1963. It sold more than one million copies, and was awarded a gold record. His second bossa nova album, also recorded in 1962, was Big Band Bossa Nova with composer and arranger Gary McFarland. As a follow-up to Jazz Samba, Getz recorded the album Jazz Samba Encore!, with one of the originators of bossa nova, Brazilian guitarist Luiz Bonfá. It also sold more than a million copies by 1964, giving Getz his second gold disc.

He then recorded the album Getz/Gilberto in 1963 with João Gilberto, his wife Astrud, and Antônio Carlos Jobim. A single from the album, "The Girl from Ipanema" became a hit (1964) and won a Grammy Award. Getz/Gilberto won two Grammys (Best Album and Best Single). Getz and producer Creed Taylor claimed that the music's success was a result of their discovery of the talent of Astrud Gilberto, who had never recorded as a vocalist. She and Gilberto and later their son, Marcelo, disputed Getz and Taylor's version of the story, and alleged that Getz contrived it to deprive her of the royalties she was due.

A live album, Getz/Gilberto Vol. 2, followed, as did Getz Au Go Go (1964), a live recording at the Cafe au Go Go in New York City. While working with the Gilbertos, he recorded the jazz album Nobody Else But Me (1964), with a new quartet including vibraphonist Gary Burton, but Verve Records, wishing to continue building the Getz brand with bossa nova, refused to release it until 30 years later, after Getz had died.

In June 1970, he discovered the trio Eddy Louiss on Hammond organ, René Thomas on guitar, and Bernard Lubat on drums playing at the Apollo in Paris. He hired them and toured with this "European group" in Europe, North America, and South America. He recorded the remarkable live album Dynasty with them in March 1971, during a gig at Ronnie Scott's Jazz Club in London.

=== Later career ===
In 1972, Getz recorded the jazz fusion album Captain Marvel with Chick Corea, Stanley Clarke and Tony Williams, and in this period experimented with an Echoplex on his saxophone. He had a cameo in the film The Exterminator (1980).

In the mid-1980s, Getz worked regularly in the San Francisco Bay area and taught at Stanford University as an artist-in-residence at the Stanford Jazz Workshop until 1988. In 1986, he was inducted into the DownBeat Jazz Hall of Fame. During 1988, Getz worked with Huey Lewis and the News on their Small World album. He played the extended solo on part 2 of the title track, which became a minor hit single.

His tenor saxophone of choice was the Selmer Mark VI.

== Personal life ==
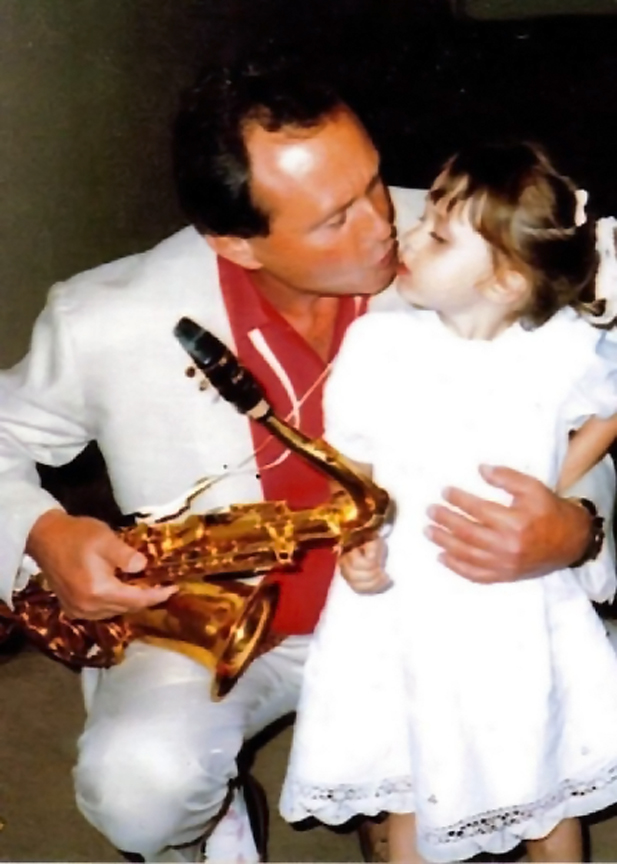
With his granddaughter Katie in 1987 at the Lincoln Center

Getz married Beverly Byrne, a vocalist with the Gene Krupa band, on November 7, 1946, in Los Angeles; the couple had three children.

In 1954, Getz held up a Seattle drugstore to obtain narcotics for his heroin addiction. After his arrest he attempted suicide by overdose. He suffered from drug and alcohol dependency on and off for decades. In 1983, he began attending Alcoholics Anonymous meetings regularly.

Getz divorced Byrne in Mexico in 1956, after which, due to Byrne's own addictions, she was unable to take care of the children. Eventually, the children were awarded by the Court to Getz's second wife, Monica Silfverskiöld, daughter of Swedish physician and former Olympic medalist Nils Silfverskiöld and Swedish Countess Mary von Rosen. Monica had insisted on raising the family together, as children had been divided among family members, and eventually they raised five children: Steven, David, and Beverley (children of Stan and Beverly); and Pamela and Nicolaus (children of Stan and Monica). The couple lived in Copenhagen, Denmark, partly to escape the prevalence of drugs in America at the time. Monica would also become Stan's manager and a major influence in his life.

In 1962, Monica returned with the family to Sweden after having discovered Stan's recurring addictions. During the following period, as he was trying to persuade her to come back, he sent her two test pressings, one of which, Jazz Samba with Charlie Byrd, was pivotal to her plans for the next record, Getz/Gilberto. However, Getz's association with Byrd soured, due to a lawsuit that Byrd initiated against the record company.

After Getz promised to stay clean and sober, Monica returned from Sweden with the family. On November 21, 1962, Brazil sent scores of musicians to Carnegie Hall as a result of the bossa nova craze created by Jazz Samba. After being told by Gilberto and Jobim that Getz had been an invisible partner in their creating of the Bossa Nova by superimposing Getz's jazz harmonies and sound on the old samba, Monica suggested a unification of the three. Jobim and Gilberto reacted with deference and enthusiasm. Getz was reluctant, at first, as he had heard the two were "difficult". Getz had reportedly said that he was convinced when Monica retorted: "Well, don't you have a reputation for being difficult?" They would become very close friends during the recording of Getz/Gilberto, and Gilberto would even move in with the Getzes, occasionally joined by the children of his own two marriages and his second wife, Miúcha.

In the early 1980s, Getz again relapsed into his addictions, resulting in an arrest with an illegal gun in the home with Monica and some of the children. This resulted in an Order of Protection, issued in her favor, which contained a clause that Getz must be sober to be allowed into the house and an Order to go to treatment. As a countermove, Getz filed for divorce from Monica in 1981, but the couple reconciled at his insistence in 1982 and signed a Reconciliation Agreement in which they agreed to jointly buy a house they had found in San Francisco. Soon after, however, Getz relapsed. After a second illegal gun and cocaine incident, Monica returned to their New York home. At this time, she discovered the need for the courts to learn about addiction and founded the National Coalition for Family Justice in 1988, around the time a divorce was finalized. In 1990, Monica Getz petitioned the United States Supreme Court to have their divorce verdict overturned, which it declined. In 1987, he was diagnosed with cancer.

Zoot Sims, who had known Getz since their time with Herman, once described him as "a nice bunch of guys", an allusion to his unpredictable personality. Bob Brookmeyer, another performing colleague, responded to speculation Getz had a heart operation with the rhetorical question "Did they put one in?"

== Death and legacy ==
Getz died of liver cancer on June 6, 1991. His ashes were poured from his saxophone case six miles off the coast of Marina del Rey, California.

== Awards ==
- Grammy Award for Best Jazz Performance, Soloist or Small Group (Instrumental) "Desafinado", 1962
- Grammy Award for Record of the Year, "The Girl from Ipanema", 1964
- Grammy Award for Album of the Year, Getz/Gilberto, Stan Getz and João Gilberto (Verve) 1964
- Grammy Award for Best Instrumental Jazz Performance, Small Group or Soloist With Small Group, Getz/Gilberto, Stan Getz 1964
- Grammy Award for Best Jazz Solo Performance, "I Remember You", 1991

== Bibliography ==
- Astrup, Arne. The Stan Getz Discography, 1978.
- Churchill, Nicholas. Stan Getz: An Annotated Bibliography and Filmography, 2005.
- Gelly, Dave. Stan Getz: Nobody Else But Me, 2002.
- Kirkpatrick, Ron. Stan Getz: An Appreciation of His Recorded Work, 1992.
- Maggin, Donald L. (1996). Stan Getz. A Life in Jazz. New York: William Morrow. ISBN 0-688-15555-3.
- Palmer, Richard. Stan Getz, 1988.
- Taylor, Dennis. Jazz Saxophone: An In-depth Look at the Styles of the Tenor Masters, 2004.
