= 2017 Nobel Prize in Literature =

- Kazuo Ishiguro
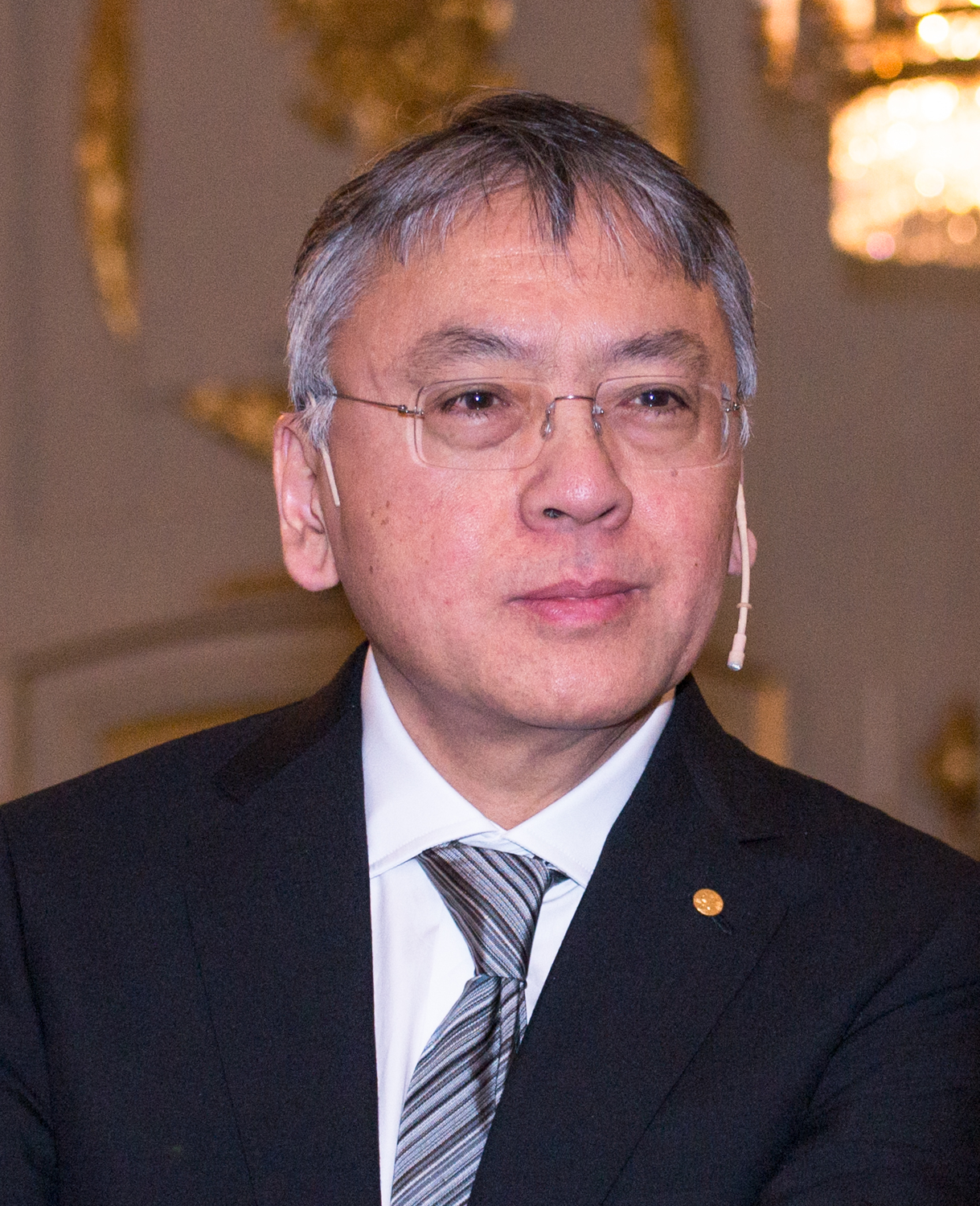
- "who, in novels of great emotional force, has uncovered the abyss beneath our illusory sense of connection with the world"
- Date: 5 October 2017 (announcement); 10 December 2017 (ceremony)
- Location: Stockholm, Sweden
- Presented by: Swedish Academy
- First award: 1901
- Website: Official website

The 2017 Nobel Prize in Literature was awarded to the British novelist Kazuo Ishiguro (born 1954) "who, in novels of great emotional force, has uncovered the abyss beneath our illusory sense of connection with the world". The prize was announced by the Swedish Academy on 5 October 2017.

Ishiguro is the 12th British writer to become a Nobel laureate in Literature after 2007 laureate Doris Lessing. He was succeeded later by novelist Abdulrazak Gurnah, who became a Nobel laureate in 2021.

== Laureate ==
Memory, time and lifelong deception are central themes in Kazuo Ishiguro's works. Growing up in a Japanese family in Great Britain has colored his thinking and perspectives. His first two novels are set in Japan – A Pale View of Hills (1982) and An Artist of the Floating World (1986). His most celebrated work, The Remains of the Day (1989), is about an English butler and his feelings for a housekeeper at the time around World War II. In later works, Ishiguro approached genres such as fantasy and science fiction as in Never Let Me Go (2005) and Klara and the Sun (2021). His language is characterized by restraint, even when dramatic events are portrayed. He is the father of British short story writer Naomi Ishiguro.

== Pre-announcement speculations ==
Favourites to be awarded the 2017 Nobel Prize in Literature included the Kenyan author Ngũgĩ wa Thiong'o, Japanese author Haruki Murakami and Canadian novelist and poet Margaret Atwood. Minutes before the announcement, The Guardian also mentioned Chinese author Yan Lianke and South Korean poet Ko Un as possible winners of the prize. Other candidates speculated about and appearing on betting lists included Israeli author Amoz Oz, American novelists Don DeLillo, Philip Roth and Joyce Carol Oates, Italian Claudio Magris, Syrian poet Adonis and Norwegian Jon Fosse (awarded in 2023). El Pais speculated about the Argentinian writer César Aira as a possible candidate.

== Reactions ==
The choice of Kazuo Ishiguro as the Nobel Prize Laureate was generally well received. "The Swedish Academy has made some dubious – and last year attention-seeking – decisions in recent years, but this year its 18 voters have got it right", John Mullan, professor of English at University College London, wrote in The Guardian, "It is because he writes for all times, using such carefully controlled means, rigorous yet utterly original, that Ishiguro is such a worthy winner." An editorial comment in the same newspaper said: "His work finds emotional force through self-restraint", "Ishiguro’s novels illuminate reality in profound, surprising ways worthy of a Nobel." Dwight Garner in the New York Times described it as "a safe choice" [in relation to the previous year's choice] "but a formidable and not uninteresting one", and praised Ishiguro for creating "worlds that are clear in a sentence-by-sentence way, but in which the big picture recedes against the horizon". James Wood in The New Yorker had hoped for the Albanian writer Ismail Kadare to win the prize and said that Ishiguro was a surprise choice who "may well be the first product of a creative-writing course to win the Nobel", praising Never Let Me Go as "one of the central novels of our age".

Salman Rushdie said “Many congratulations to my old friend Ish, whose work I’ve loved and admired ever since I first read A Pale View of Hills". Former UK Poet Laureate Andrew Motion said "by resting his stories on founding principles which combine a very fastidious kind of reserve with equally vivid indications of emotional intensity. It's a remarkable and fascinating combination, and wonderful to see it recognised by the Nobel prize-givers.” Kazuo Ishiguro himself said:

"It's a magnificent honour, mainly because it means that I'm in the footsteps of the greatest authors that have lived, so that's a terrific commendation. The world is in a very uncertain moment and I would hope all the Nobel Prizes would be a force for something positive in the world as it is at the moment. I'll be deeply moved if I could in some way be part of some sort of climate this year in contributing to some sort of positive atmosphere at a very uncertain time."

Commentators from University of Gothenburg described it as a "safe and conventional choice" of a "well established novelist in the grand traditional English novel", and also as somewhat surprising that Ishiguro was chosen over British authors Salman Rushdie and Ian McEwan, who had been mentioned as possible candidates for the prize.

== Award ceremony speech ==
In her award ceremony speech on 10 December 2017 Sara Danius, permanent secretary of the Swedish Academy, said of Ishiguro: "An Ishiguro story is like a mix of Jane Austen and Franz Kafka. This may sound odd. Strictly speaking, it should be impossible. But Ishiguro shows that it works. It works well indeed. Herein lies much of his greatness. On the one hand, there is depiction of the ordinary, the enforced protocols of social life, the irrevocable ironies of human existence. On the other hand, an awareness of the absurdly comical, like Kafka’s Gregor Samsa waking up after a restless night only to realise that he has been transformed into an insect.", "His writing comes out of the realistic nineteenth-century tradition, with innovators such as Jane Austen, Charles Dickens, Charlotte Brontë and George Eliot. This was when the novel opened its window onto the quotidian world. Ishiguro too is an innovator, always taking risks. With every new book he investigates a new genre-mix, with elements of the detective story, science fiction, myth ... The window of the novel has always been wide. Ishiguro has widened it even more."

== Nobel lecture ==
Kazuo Ishiguro's Nobel lecture My Twentieth Century Evening – and Other Small Breakthroughs was delivered at the Swedish Academy on 7 December 2017.

== Gallery ==
- 5 October 2017: Announcement of the 2017 Nobel laureate in Literature by Sara Danius, permanent secretary of the Swedish Academy.
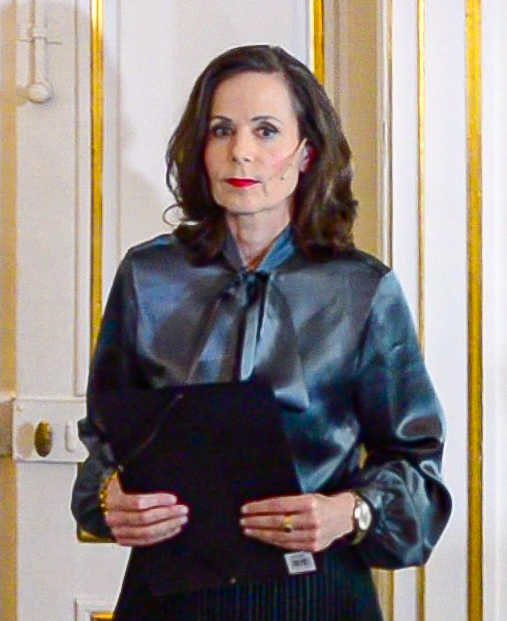

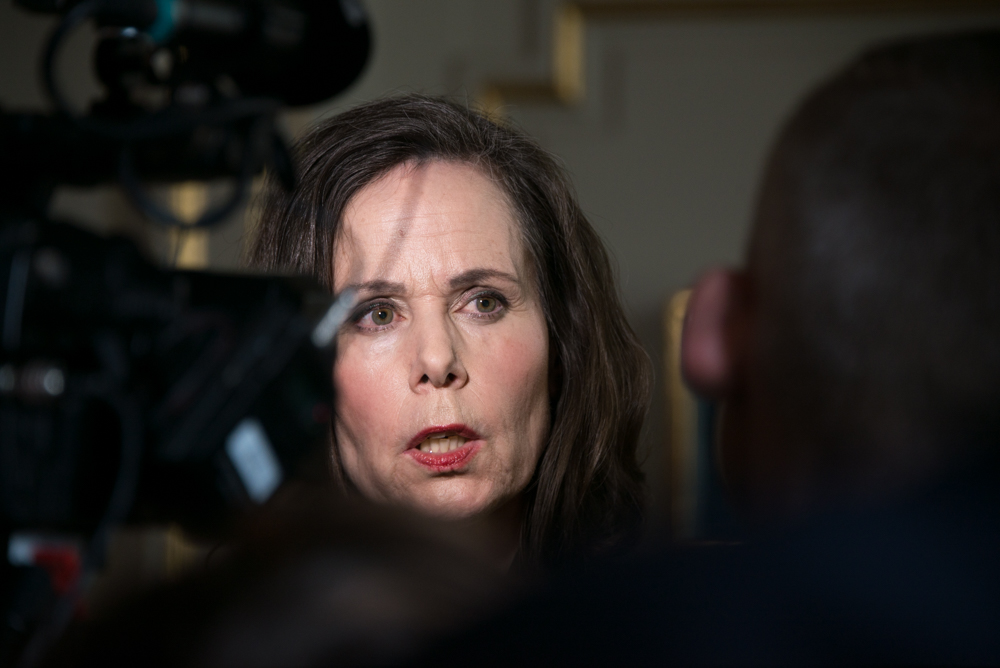

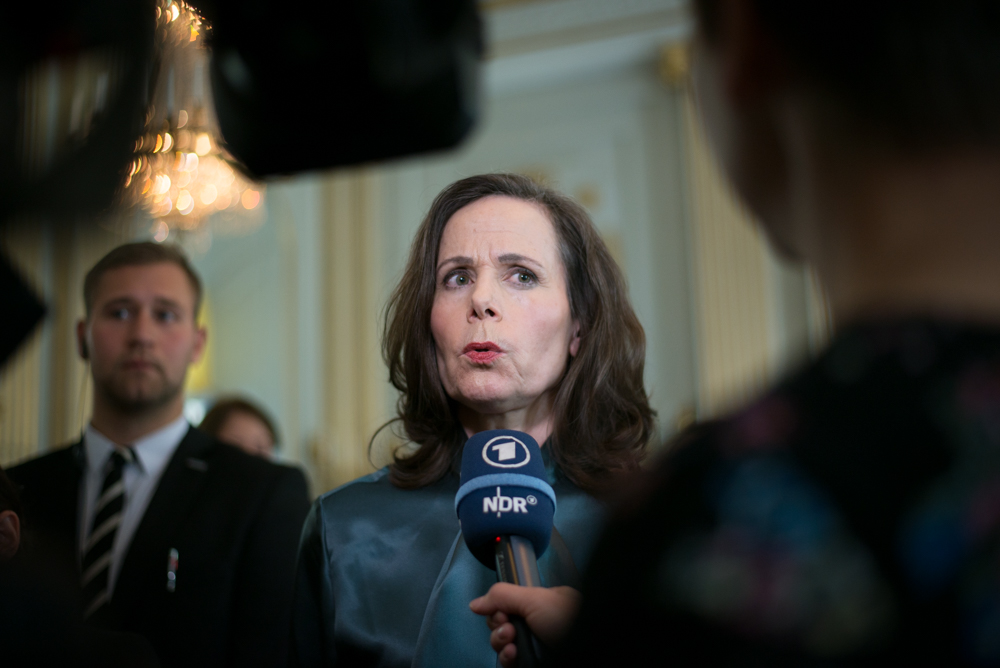

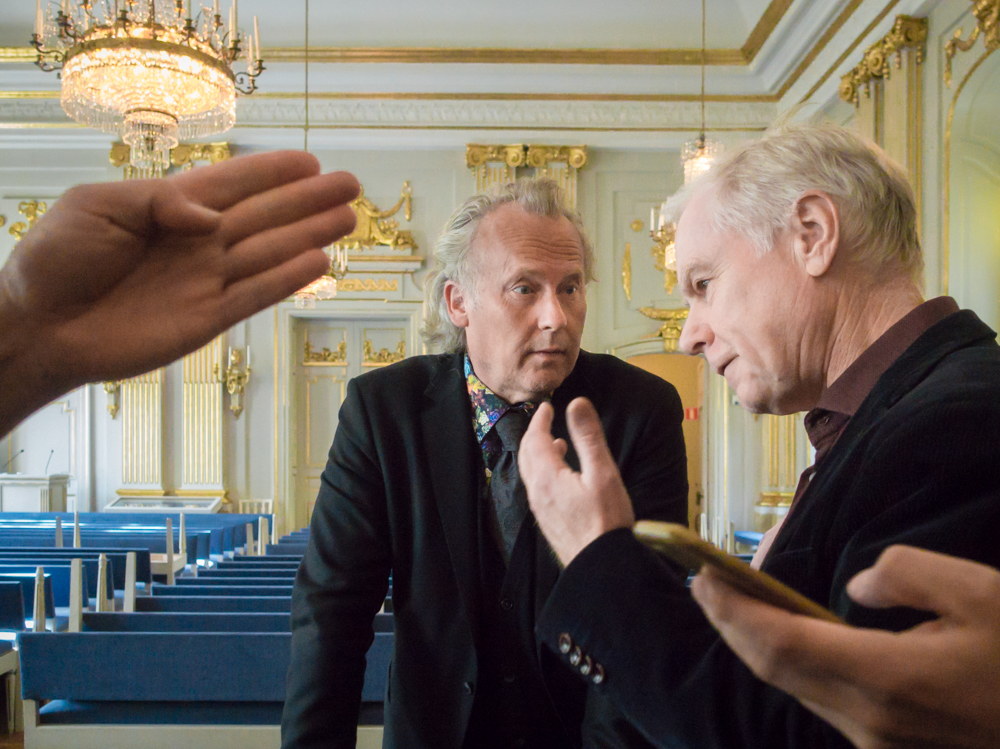

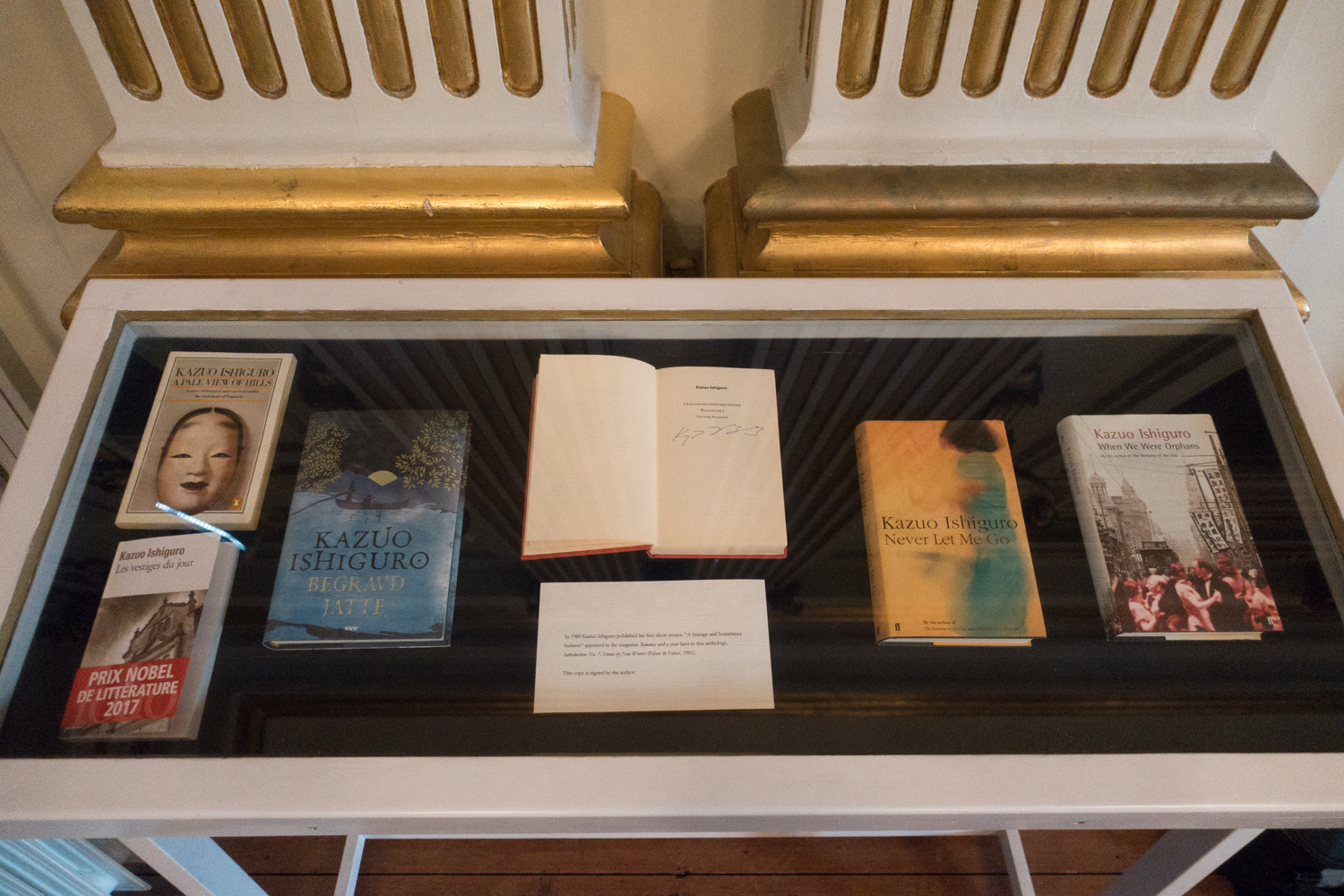
- 6 December 2017: Kazuo Ishiguro in Stockholm during the Swedish Academy's press conference.
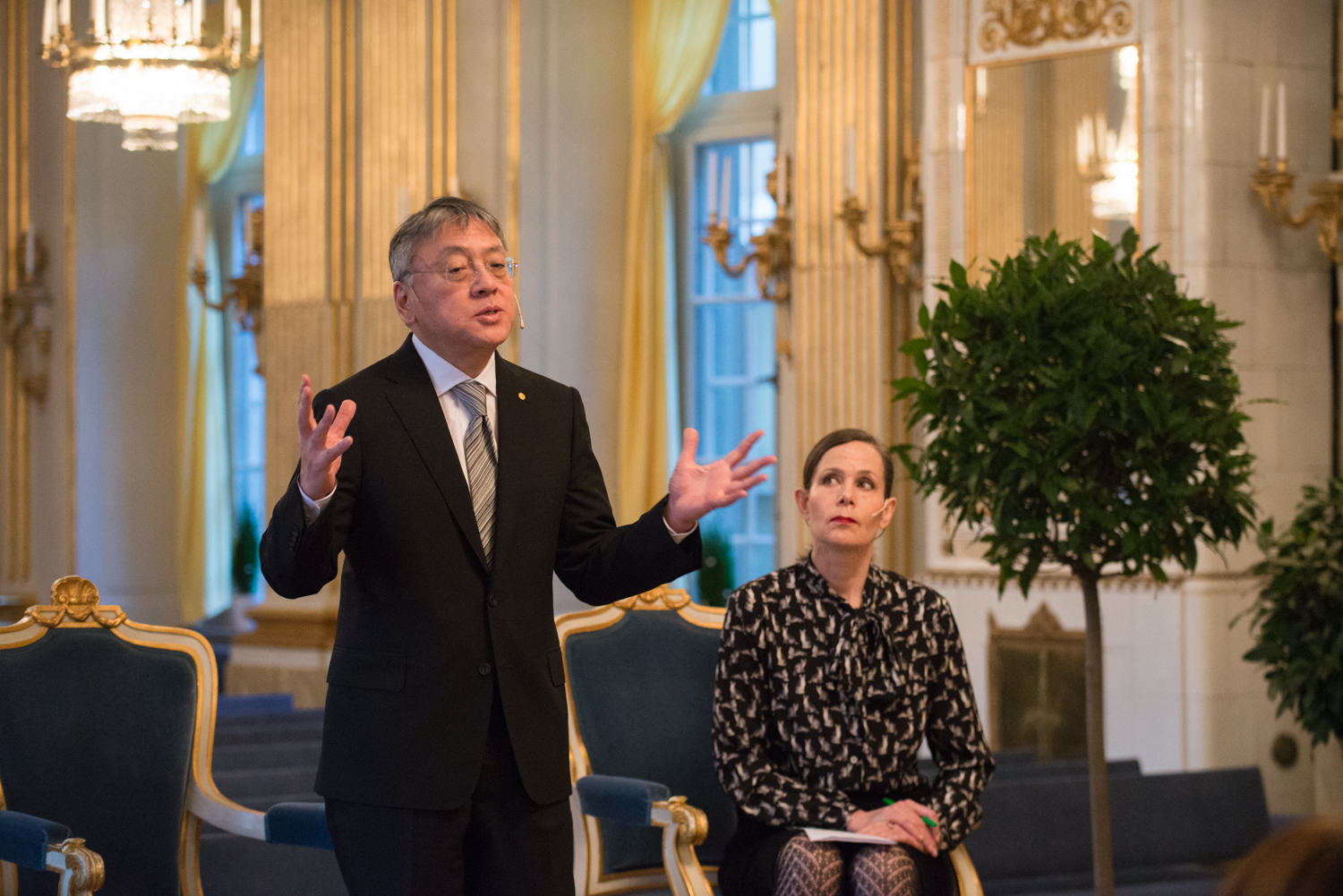

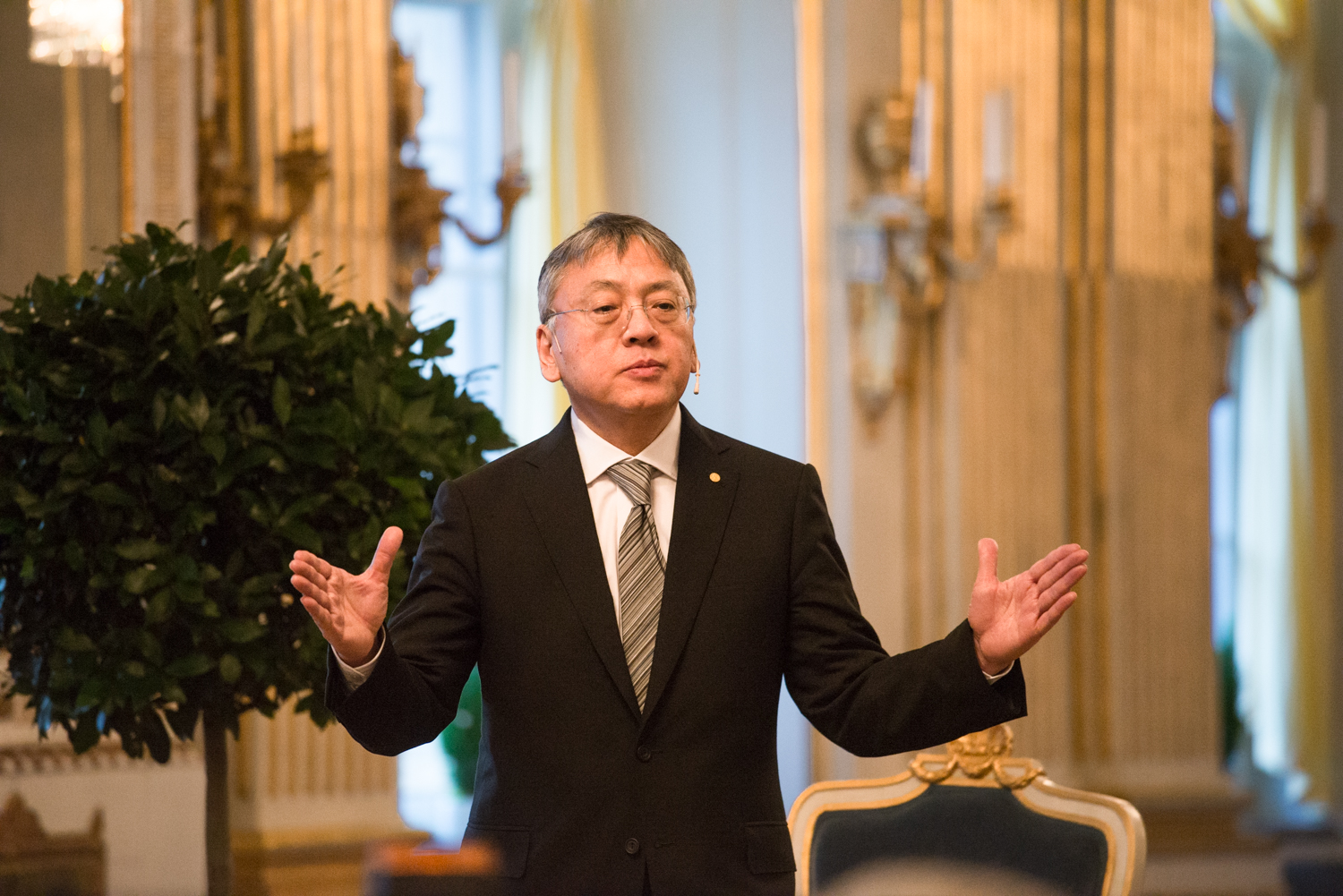

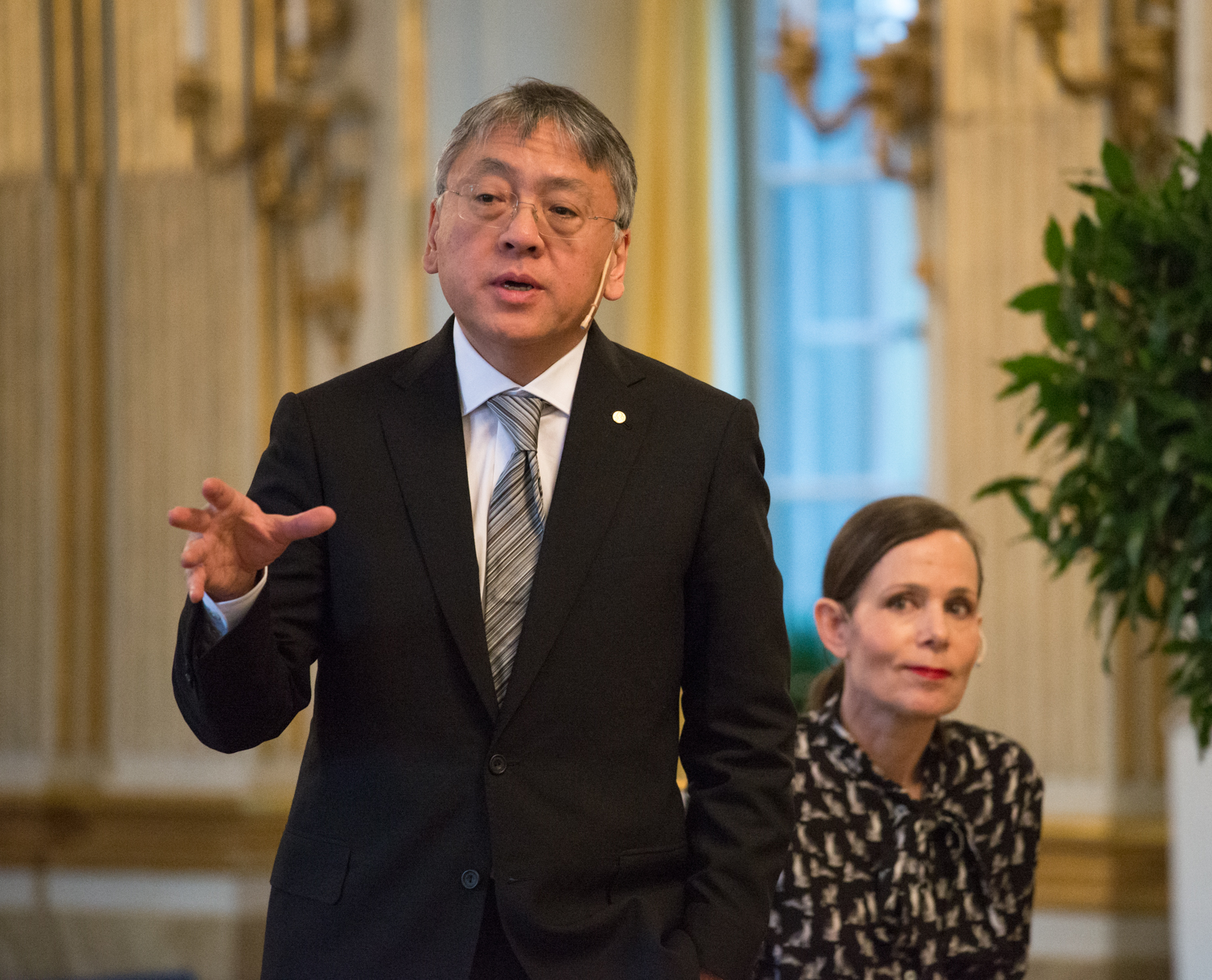

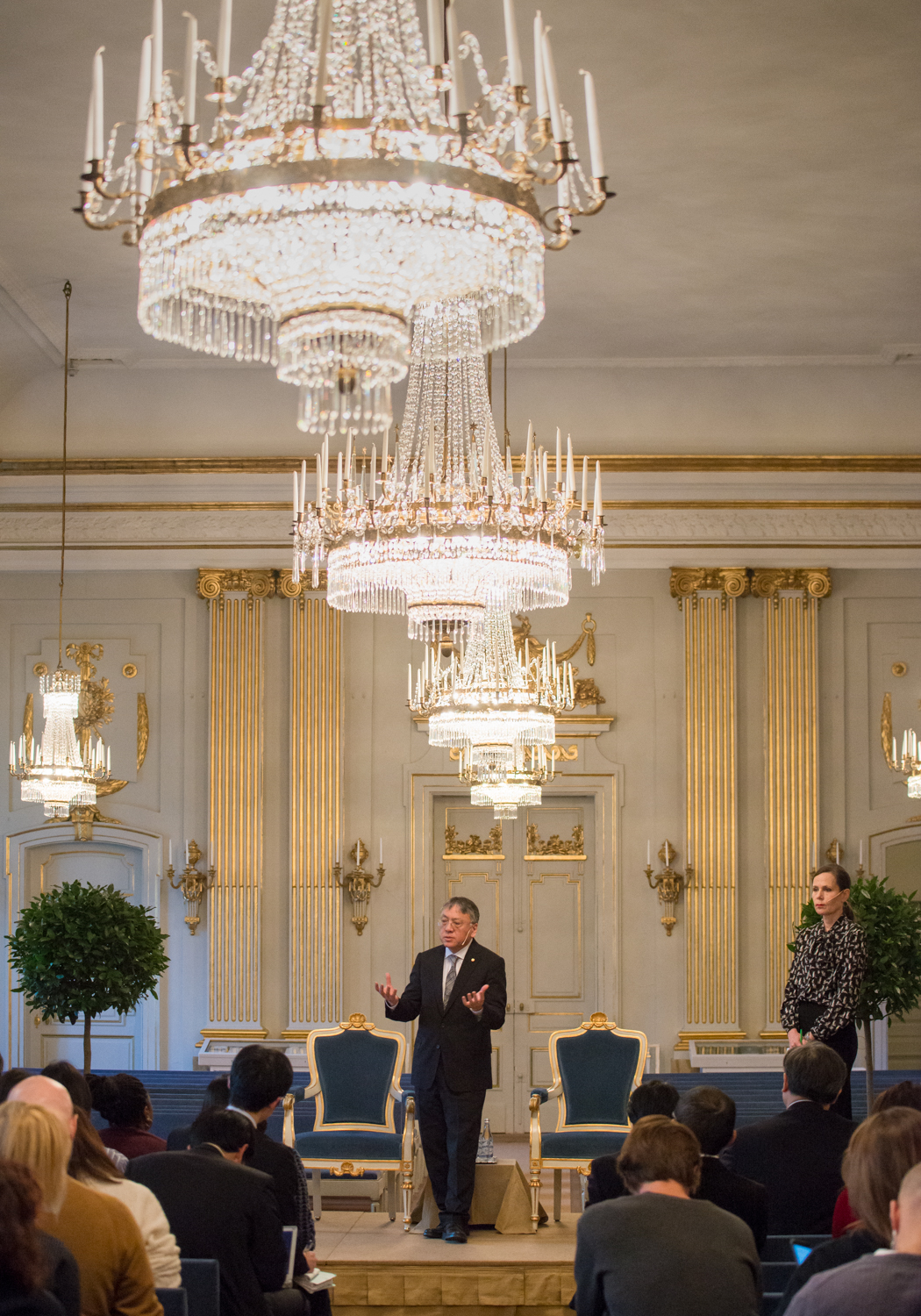

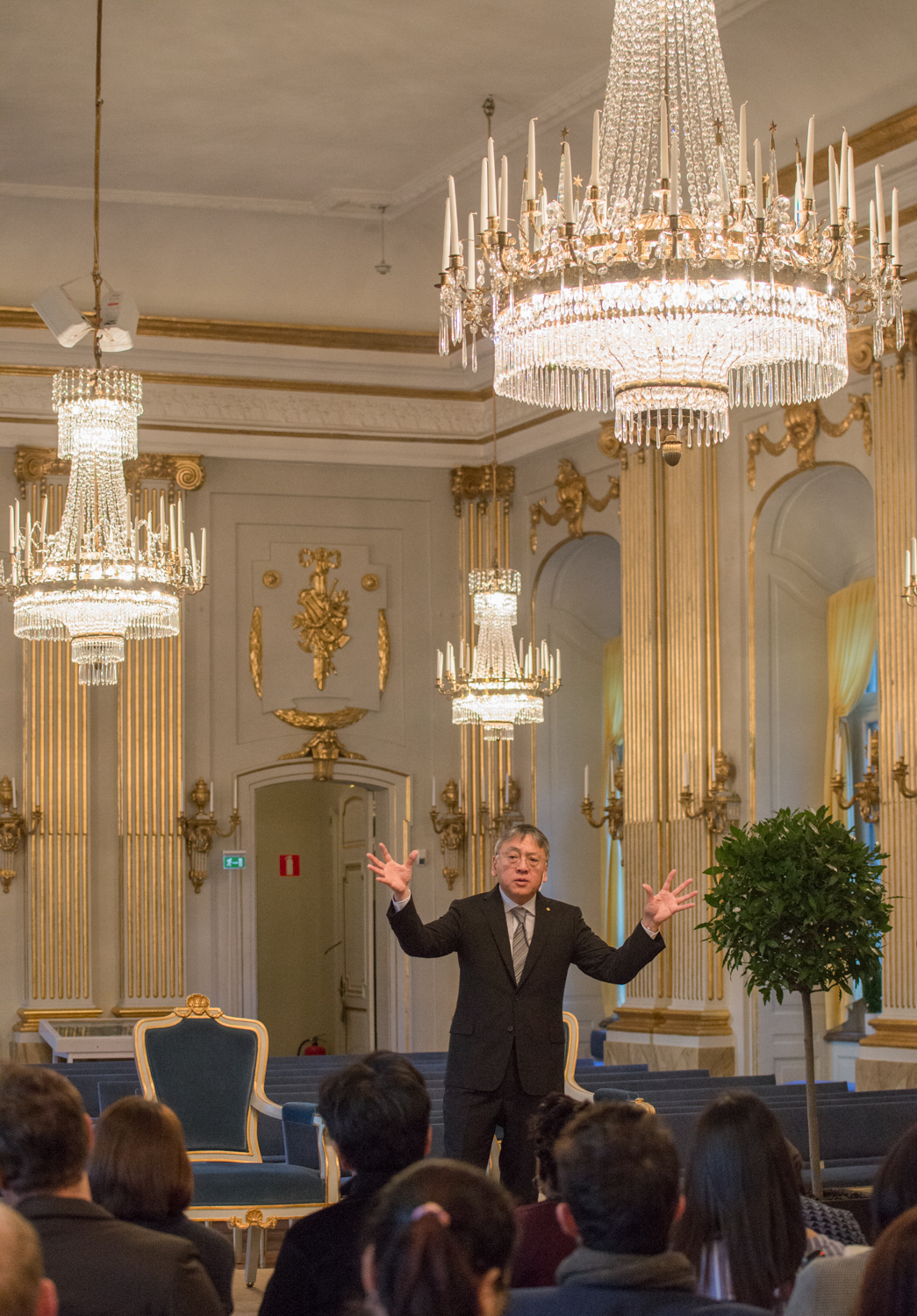

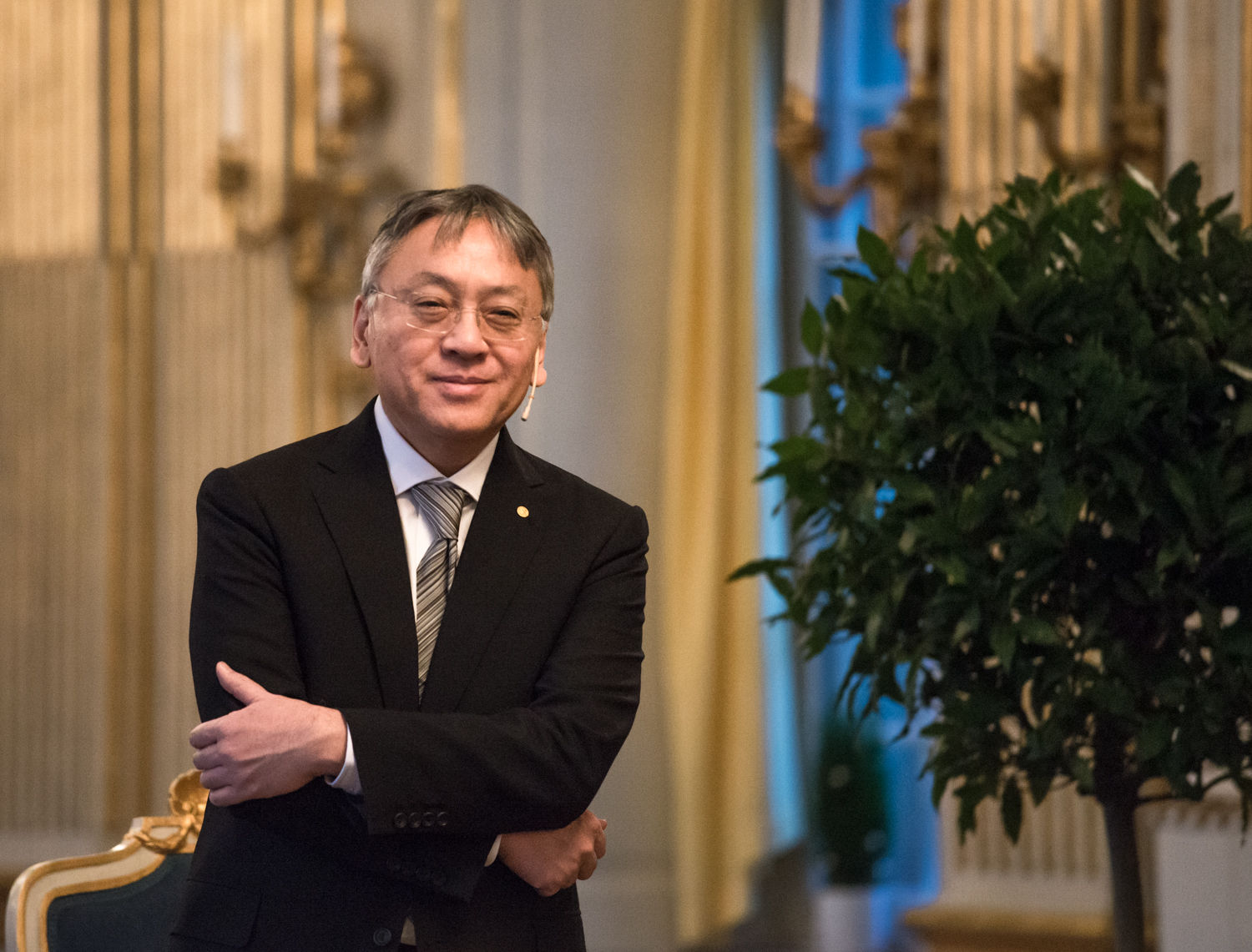

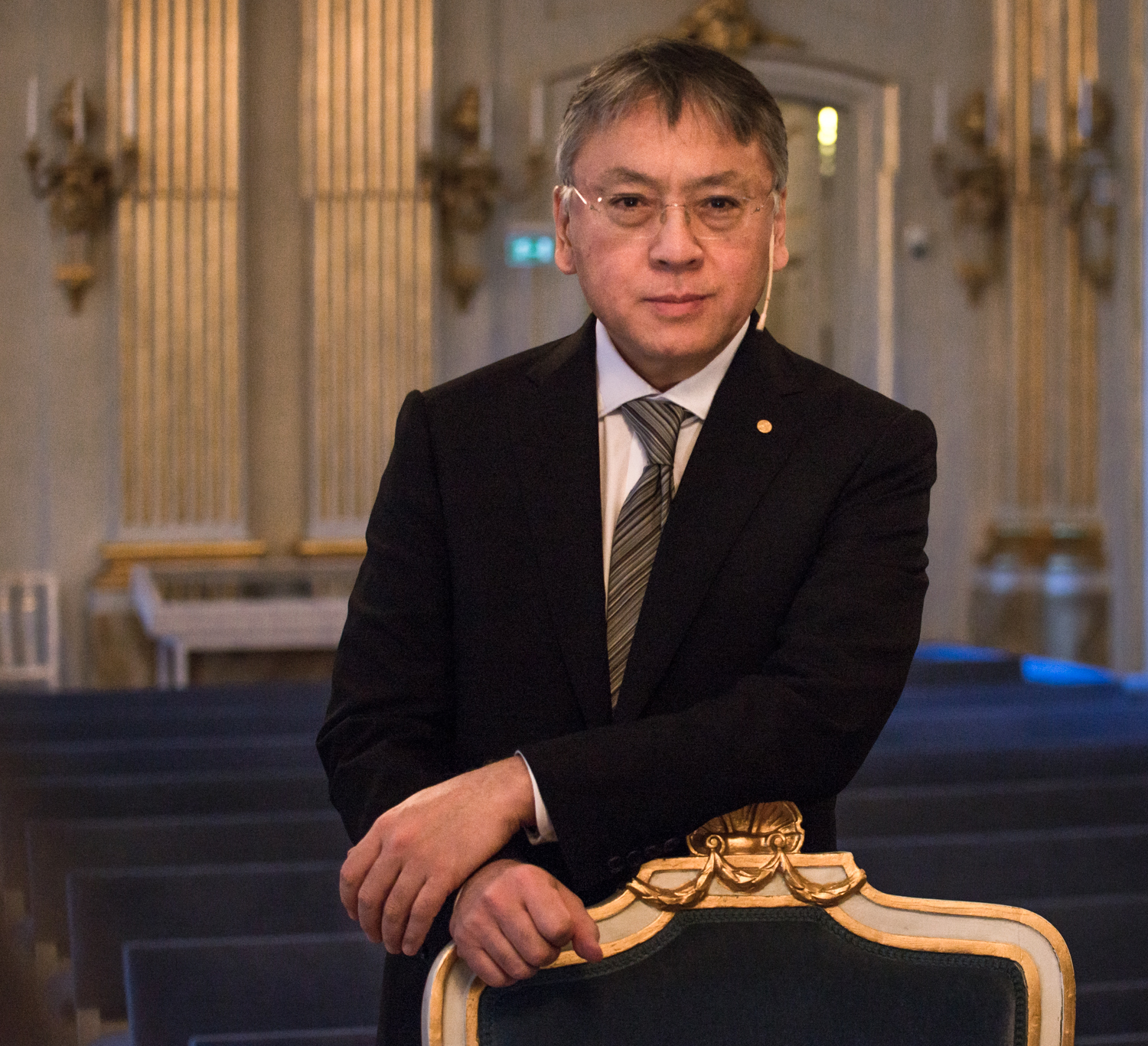

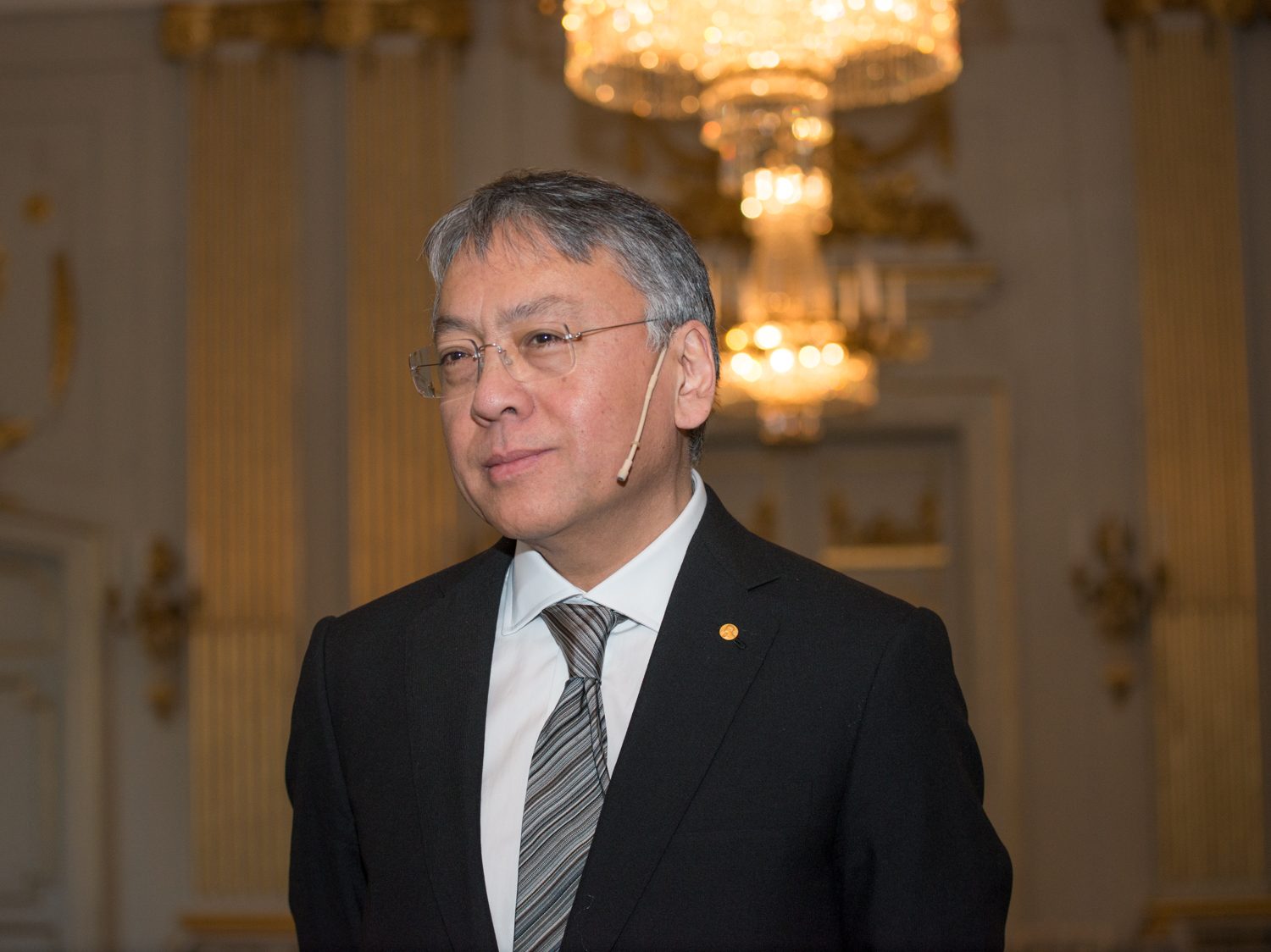
