= Miss Lambert Steps Aboard Danger =

March 2027 novel by Kazuo Ishiguro

Miss Lambert Steps Aboard Danger by Kazuo Ishiguro
- Publisher's book jacket
- Author: Kazuo Ishiguro
- Illustrator: Oliver Munday
- Language: English
- Subject: Mystery, Espionage
- Genre: Fiction, Comic humor
- Published: March 9, 2027
- Publisher: Faber & Faber, Alfred A. Knopf
- Media type: Print, E-book, Audio
- Pages: 240
- ISBN: 9798217208975
- OCLC: 1596855666
- Preceded by: Klara and the Sun
- Website: Official website

Miss Lambert Steps Aboard Danger is Kazuo Ishiguro's ninth novel which will be released in March 2027. It will be Ishiguro's next novel after Klara and the Sun, which was published in 2021.

== Plot summary ==
The novel is set in the same period and setting as his 1989 novel The Remains of the Day. The novel is set in London, England in 1938, the year before World War II breaks out. Richard Hadley meets the titular Miss Lambert and they bond over their shared interest in singing.

== See also ==
- Comedy of manners
