= Earthly Powers =

1980 book by Anthony Burgess

- First edition
- Author: Anthony Burgess
- Language: English
- Genre: Historical novel
- Publisher: Hutchinson
- Publication date: October 13, 1980
- Publication place: United Kingdom
- Media type: Print (hardback & paperback)
- Pages: 678 pp
- ISBN: 0-09-143910-8
- OCLC: 7016660
- Dewey Decimal: 823/.914 19
- LC Class: PR6052.U638 E2 1980b

Earthly Powers is a panoramic saga novel of the 20th century by Anthony Burgess first published on 13 October 1980. It begins with the "outrageously provocative" first sentence: "It was the afternoon of my eighty-first birthday, and I was in bed with my catamite when Ali announced that the archbishop had come to see me."

On one level it is a parody of a "blockbuster" novel, with the 81-year-old hero, Kenneth Toomey (allegedly loosely based on British author W. Somerset Maugham), telling the story of his life in 82 chapters. It "summed up the literary, social and moral history of the century with comic richness as well as encyclopedic knowingness", according to Malcolm Bradbury.

The novel appeared on the shortlist for the Booker Prize in the year of its publication but lost out to William Golding's Rites of Passage. In an October 2006 poll in The Observer, it was named joint third for the best work of British and Commonwealth fiction of the last 25 years (along with Ian McEwan's Atonement, Penelope Fitzgerald's The Blue Flower, Kazuo Ishiguro's The Unconsoled, and Salman Rushdie's Midnight's Children).

== Plot summary ==
On his eighty-first birthday, retired homosexual writer Kenneth Toomey is asked by the Archbishop of Malta to assist in the process of canonisation of Carlo Campanati, the late Pope Gregory XVII and his brother-in-law. Toomey subsequently works on his memoirs, which span the major part of the 20th century.

== Themes ==
- The problem of evil
- Censorship
- Divorce
- Domenico's brother Don Carlo's ascent to the papacy
- Ecumenism
- Exorcism
- Pederasty
- Gay rights
- Hollywood
- Terminal illness and euthanasia
- The marriage of his sister Hortense to composer Domenico Campanati
- The relationship between love and lust
- Toomey's break with the Roman Catholic Church, which regards homosexual acts as intrinsically disordered

== Places ==
- England
- France
- Italy
- Malaysia
- Malta
- Tangier, Morocco
- Uganda
- United States
- Germany
- Austria
- Spain
- Ireland
- Monaco

== References to historical events ==
The novel includes coverage of:

- The Great War
- The 1918–1919 influenza pandemic
- The rise of fascism in Italy
- Nazi Germany
- World War II
- Post-colonialism in Africa

Since it is an integral theme of the novel that the protagonist is an unreliable narrator, the work highlights the fallibility of memory by including many deliberate factual errors, as explained by Burgess in the second volume of his autobiography, You've Had Your Time. These may be found on almost every page of the novel, and vary in subtlety from inaccuracies of German grammar to deliberately contrary re-writings of history.

- The fictional Carlo Campanati becomes Pope Gregory XVII. This name was allegedly the one to be adopted by Giuseppe Siri, who four times failed to be elected Pope in controversial circumstances. The dates of Carlo's papal election (1958) and death (3 June 1963) correspond to those of Pope John XXIII, as does his general appearance. However, many of Campanati's achievements and attributes are shared by the real-life Pope Paul VI, who, like Carlo, was Archbishop of Milan before his election. Other concordances between Carlo and Paul VI include his dealings with Benito Mussolini's government, his support for Jews escaping the Nazis, his arguments against contraception and priestly marriage, and his world travels during his papacy. Carlo's plan for an ecumenical reorganisation of the church is reflected in both John XXIII, who called the Second Vatican Council, and in Paul VI, who opted to continue the council after John's death.
- The Jonestown mass suicide of 1978 is presented in the form of a fictional group called the "Children of God" (not to be confused with the new religious movement of the same name). While the basic premise of the incident is retained in the novel (charismatic religious leader leads a group of disenfranchised followers to ritual suicide), many of the details are changed. In the novel, the mass suicide takes place in 1963, not 1978, in a compound located in the Mojave Desert of California, not Guyana, and the congregation is given cyanide tablets, rather than the now-infamous poisoned Flavor Aid.
- In chapter 47, Toomey, one of whose books is turned into a film in Nazi Germany, is invited to a film festival in Berlin. He takes the airship LZ 129 Hindenburg which from 6 May 1936 until the disaster of 6 May 1937 at Lakehurst NJ made ten trips to the US. In Berlin "nowhere on the streets so clean you could eat your dinner from them did I see wretches wearing the yellow David star into trucks being harried. That would all be round the back."

The yellow badge was not introduced in Germany until 1 September 1941.

- There is a reception with Goebbels at the Propagandaministerium, "he in tails, his lady in white and jewels. I had met her before ... when she was still the wife of a certain Herr Friedländer, a rich jew who had been forced by the party to endow her on her new marriage with half a million marks and also to give her new husband as a wedding present the Friedländer Schloss at Schwannwerder."

Actually the Jewish merchant Friedländer had been her stepfather and thus made her Magda Friedländer. Before industrialist Günther Quandt married her in 1921, on request of her mother's first husband, Dr. Ritschel, Magda was registered as his daughter. After her divorce from Quandt in 1929 Magda married Goebbels in 1931 and bore him six children. In 1934 the Goebbelses settled on the island of Schwanenwerder buying cheaply from persecuted Jews.

- In chapter 49 the first film shown at the festival is Hitlerjunge Quex, an early Nazi film of 1933, on the next day to be followed by the premiere of a new film on the life of Horst Wessel. The reader is correctly informed that already in 1933 a film on Horst Wessel had been made, but out of "suspicions that the film would not really serve ... the name of the hero had been changed to Hans Westmar."

That the premiere of Hans Westmar had actually, as the novel states, been attended not only by Hermann Göring but also by Wilhelm Furtwängler is unlikely.

- In the fictional Horst Wessel film Toomey gets to see, the Berliner Wessel is played by the popular Viennese actor Paul Hörbiger. Wessel had died in February 1930 at the age of 22 (the novel says the funeral was in 1929). Hörbiger in 1936/37 was 42 years old and married with four children. The novel describes him as "quite clearly to me homosexual: impulses flashed between us in the garish swastika-flagged eau-de-cologne-sprayed entrance hall". This has nothing to do with the real Hörbiger.
- The fictional writer Jakob Strehler, whose work Toomey starts reading, is said to have been awarded the Nobel Prize in Literature in 1935. The prize was not awarded that year.
