= A Pale View of Hills (film) =

2025 drama film

- International promotional poster
- Japanese: 遠い山なみの光
- Directed by: Kei Ishikawa
- Screenplay by: Kei Ishikawa
- Based on: A Pale View of Hills by Kazuo Ishiguro
- Produced by: Hiroyuki Ishiguro; Miyuki Fukuma; Stephen Woolley; Elizabeth Karlsen; Mariusz Włodarski; Marta Gmosińska
- Starring: Suzu Hirose; Fumi Nikaido; Yō Yoshida; Camilla Aiko
- Cinematography: Piotr Niemyjski
- Music by: Paweł Mykietyn
- Production companies: U-Next; Bunbuku; Lava Films; Number 9 Films
- Distributed by: Gaga
- Release date: 15 May 2025 (Cannes)
- Running time: 123 minutes
- Countries: United Kingdom; Japan; Poland
- Languages: English; Japanese

A Pale View of Hills (Japanese: 遠い山なみの光) is a 2025 Japanese drama film written and directed by Kei Ishikawa, based on the 1982 novel by Kazuo Ishiguro. The plot follows a widow's memories unraveling between Japan in the 1950s and England in the 1980s. It stars Suzu Hirose, Fumi Nikaido, Yō Yoshida and Camilla Aiko.

A Pale View of Hills had its world premiere at the Un Certain Regard section of the 2025 Cannes Film Festival on 15 May.

== Cast ==
- Suzu Hirose as Etsuko (1950s)
- Fumi Nikaido as Sachiko
- Yō Yoshida as Etsuko (1980s)
- Camilla Aiko as Niki
- Kouhei Matsushita as Jiro
- Tomokazu Miura as Ogata

== Production ==
In August 2024, Suzu Hirose joined the cast of the film, with Kei Ishikawa directing from a screenplay he wrote, based upon the novel of the same name by Kazuo Ishiguro, with Ishiguro serving as executive producer.

Principal photography began in August 2024, and was in post-production by January 2025.

== Release ==
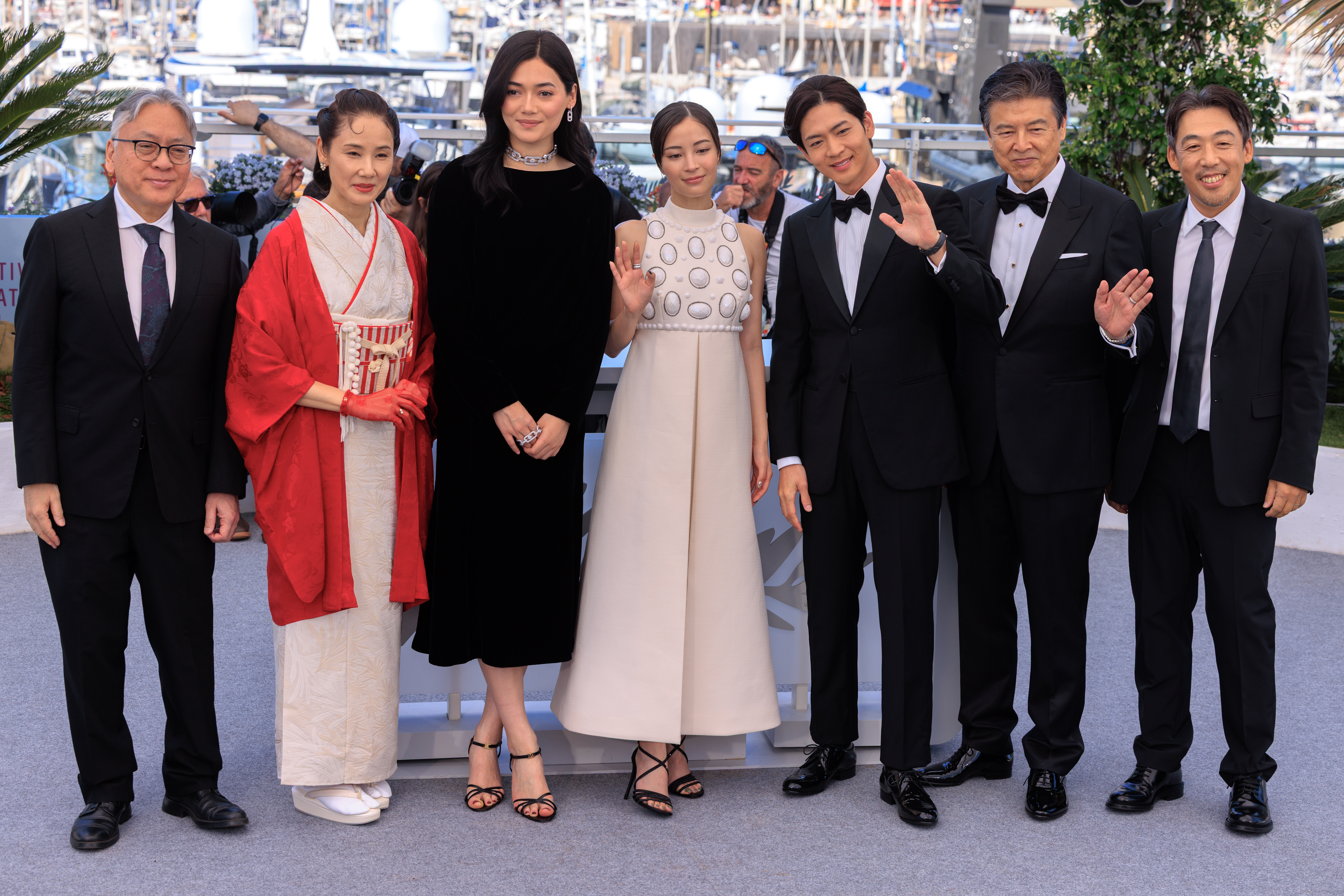
The cast and crew of A Pale View of Hills at the 2025 Cannes Film Festival

A Pale View of Hills had its world premiere at the 2025 Cannes Film Festival in Un Certain Regard section on 15 May 2025.

== Reception ==
On the review aggregator website Rotten Tomatoes, 63% of 24 critics' reviews are positive.

== Accolades ==
Award	Category	Recipient(s)	Result	Ref.
38th Nikkan Sports Film Awards	Best Film	A Pale View of Hills	Nominated	
38th Nikkan Sports Film Awards	Best Director	Kei Ishikawa	Nominated	
38th Nikkan Sports Film Awards	Best Actress	Suzu Hirose	Won	
38th Nikkan Sports Film Awards	Best Supporting Actress	Fumi Nikaido	Nominated	
47th Yokohama Film Festival	Best Actress	Suzu Hirose	Won	
80th Mainichi Film Awards	Best Supporting Performance	Fumi Nikaido	Nominated	
80th Mainichi Film Awards	Best Art Direction	Hiroyuki Wagatsuma and Adam Marshall	Nominated	
68th Blue Ribbon Awards	Best Film	A Pale View of Hills	Nominated	
68th Blue Ribbon Awards	Best Actress	Suzu Hirose	Won	
49th Japan Academy Film Prize	Best Actress	Suzu Hirose	Nominated	
