= Frank McLynn =

British author, historian and journalist

Frank McLynn FRHistS FRGS
- Born: Francis James McLynn; 29 August 1941 (age 84); United Kingdom
- Occupation: Author
- Notable work: Napoleon Genghis Khan 1066: The Year of the Three Battles

Francis James McLynn (born 29 August 1941), known as Frank McLynn, is a British author, biographer, novelist, historian and journalist.

He is known for biographies of Napoleon, Robert Louis Stevenson, Carl Jung, Richard Francis Burton and Henry Morton Stanley.

== Early life and education ==
McLynn was educated at the John Fisher School, Purley, and won an Open Scholarship in Classics to Wadham College, Oxford. Once at Oxford, McLynn switched to Politics, Philosophy and Economics (PPE). McLynn explained his choice by stating that "history and literature were my first loves, and I would always read them in future life, but I doubted that I would ever pick up a book on economics or philosophy again". This multi-disciplinary course formed part of McLynn's ambition to become a polymath.

== Career ==
McLynn entered the professional world as a journalist. He developed an interest in Latin America, and spent two years in Colombia as deputy director of the British Council, and a subsequent year in Argentina as a Parry/Ford Foundation Fellow. He was awarded a PhD in the early 1970s for a thesis on Argentina in the 1860s.

Prior to and during his career as a writer, McLynn worked in academic positions in the UK and USA.

=== Academic positions ===
| University/College | Position | Years |
|---|---|---|
| King's College London | Assistant lecturer | 1972-74 |
| Humboldt State University | Lecturer | 1977-78 |
| St Antony's, Oxford | Alistair Horne Research Fellow | 1987-88 |
| Strathclyde University, Glasgow | Visiting Professor | 1996-2001 |
| Goldsmith's College, London | Professorial Fellow | 2000-02 |

=== Awards and nominations ===
McLynn was shortlisted for the NCR Book Award for Carl Gustav Jung: A Biography

== Bibliography ==
=== Books ===
| Title | First Published | Publisher | Reissued | Reissued By |
|---|---|---|---|---|
| France and the Jacobite Rising of 1745 | 1981 | Edinburgh University Press | | |
| The Jacobite Army in England, 1745–46 | 1983 | John Donald Publishers Ltd | | |
| The Jacobites | 1985 | Routledge & Kegan Paul | | |
| Invasion: From the Armada to Hitler | 1987 | Routledge | | |
| Charles Edward Stuart: A Tragedy in Many Acts | 1988 | Routledge | 2020 | Sharpe Books |
| Crime and Punishment in Eighteenth Century England | 1989 | Routledge | | |
| Stanley: The Making of an African Explorer, 1841–1877 | 1989 | Constable & Co. | | |
| From the Sierras to the Pampas: Richard Burton's Travels in The Americas, 1860–69 | 1991 | Trafalgar Square | | |
| Stanley: Sorcerer's Apprentice | 1991 | Constable & Co. | | |
| Snow upon the Desert: The Life of Sir Richard Burton | 1993 | John Murray Publishers Ltd | | |
| Hearts of Darkness: The European Exploration of Africa | 1993 | Caroll & Graf Publishers | | |
| Famous Letters: Messages & Thoughts That Shaped Our World | 1993 | Reader's Digest Association | | |
| Fitzroy MacLean | 1993 | John Murray Publishers Ltd | | |
| Robert Louis Stevenson: A Biography | 1994 | Random House | | |
| Famous Trials: Cases That Made History | 1995 | Reader's Digest | | |
| Napoleon: A Biography | 1997 | Arcade Publishing | | |
| Carl Gustav Jung: A Biography | 1997 | Thomas Dunne Books | | |
| 1066: The Year of the Three Battles | 1998 | Johnathan Cape | | Pimlico |
| Villa and Zapata: A History of the Mexican Revolution | 2000 | Basic Books | | |
| Wagons West: The Epic Story of America's Overland Trails | 2002 | Grove Press | | |
| 1759: The Year Britain Became Master of the World | 2005 | Atlantic Monthly Press | | |
| Lionheart and Lackland: King Richard, King John and the Wars of Conquest* | 2006 | Jonathan Cape | | |
| Marcus Aurelius: Warrior, Philosopher, Emperor | 2009 | Bodley Head | | |
| Heroes and Villains: Inside the Minds of the Greatest Warriors in History | 2009 | Pegasus | | |
| The Burma Campaign: Disaster Into Triumph 1942–45 | 2010 | Bodley Head | 2011 | Yale University Press |
| Captain Cook: Master of the Seas | 2011 | Yale University Press | | |
| The Road Not Taken: How Britain Narrowly Missed a Revolution, 1381–1926 | 2012 | Random House | | |
| Genghis Khan: The Man Who Conquered the World | 2015 | Bodley Head | | |
| Bipolar: The South Pole | 2018 | Crux Publishing | | |
| Bipolar: The North Pole | | | | |

*Published in the US as Richard and John: Kings at War (2007), Da Capo Press

=== As editor ===
- Of No Country: An Anthology of the Works of Sir Richard Burton (1990), London: Scribners

== Awards and accolades ==
- Cheltenham Prize for Literature (1985; for The Jacobite Army in England)
- Shortlisted, McVitie's Prize for Scottish Writer of the Year (1989, for Charles Edward Stuart)

== See also ==
- Legacy and memory of Napoleon
