= The Unconsoled =

1995 novel by Kazuo Ishiguro

- First edition
- Author: Kazuo Ishiguro
- Language: English
- Publisher: Faber and Faber
- Publication date: 1995
- Publication place: United Kingdom
- Media type: Print (Paperback)
- Pages: 535 pp (paperback edition)
- ISBN: 0-571-17718-2 (paperback edition)

The Unconsoled is a novel by Kazuo Ishiguro, first published in 1995 by Faber and Faber, and winner of the Cheltenham Prize that year.

== Summary ==
Ryder, an English pianist, arrives by invitation to an unspecified European city. At his hotel, he is greeted by Hilde Stratmann of the city arts council, who alludes to his fully booked schedule over the coming days to meet with the eager and admiring public, leading up to a highly anticipated "Thursday night". Ryder considers admitting to not remembering the schedule, but instead feigns knowledge.

With no time to rest, Ryder is accosted by a procession of locals who politely, yet insistently, beg him to fulfill personal requests. Gustav, an old porter at the hotel who is not on speaking terms with his daughter, Sophie, asks Ryder to intervene to resolve her private worries for the sake of Sophie's young son, Boris. Despite meeting Sophie and Boris for the first time, when around them, Ryder remembers himself as being Boris's established stepfather, indignantly shielding Boris when others impose adult responsibilities upon the boy. Likewise, he and Sophie treat each other as long-term partners, confiding over Sophie's struggle to house-hunt for the three of them, and bickering over Ryder's frequent travel obligations and absences. Throughout the city, Ryder also recognizes, improbably, various people, places and objects from his childhood in England.

The locals expect Ryder to deliver a recital and a lecture to address their ongoing cultural crisis, precipitated when Christoff, a once-fêted celebrity cellist, fell from favor. The city has laid its hopes for an arts revival on the shoulders of Brodsky, a disgraced, inactive conductor and an alcoholic, who will conduct an orchestral concert on Thursday night after undergoing rehabilitation. Hoffman, the hotel's manager, is personally overseeing Brodsky's rehearsal, pledging that Thursday night's proceedings will be impeccable. However, because Brodsky yearns for the company of his estranged ex-wife, Miss Collins, the concert planners privately beseech her to reconcile with him, despite her misgivings.

Over days, Ryder is ushered from place to place, accidentally arriving for appointments never made, while missing appointments that Stratmann explicitly arranged. At the same time, he promises to advocate for Gustav and his fraternity of fellow hotel porters in his address. Ryder also evaluates the piano skill of Stephan, the Hoffmans' son, endorsing his plan to perform a difficult piece on Thursday night. Believing that being noncommittal to piano studies caused his parents' marriage to break down, Stephan hopes to redeem himself, despite learning too late that his mother dislikes his chosen piece. Amidst all this, Ryder is surprised by the reminder that his elderly parents, who require caretakers, will arrive for a stay in the city. As Thursday night approaches, Ryder struggles to compose his address, practice for his recital, and confirm his parents' arrival and accommodation.

Ryder is further delayed when Gustav suddenly falls to ill health, while Brodsky, after his persistent overtures to Collins prove futile, relapses to drink with Hoffman's approval, and crashes his bicycle. Ryder chaperones Sophie and Boris to Gustav, then impatiently leaves them. A doctor performs an emergency amputation of Brodsky's leg, not noticing that it was a prosthetic all along. At the concert hall, even though his parents cannot bear to watch his performance, Stephan perseveres in his recital and is applauded. Brodsky, comically using an ironing board as a crutch, conducts the orchestra while drunk, one-legged and bleeding, humiliating himself and being publicly spurned by Collins. Hoffman, likewise chastened by his own failure, grovels before his unsympathetic wife. Stephan, gaining newfound confidence, plans to seek his fortunes outside the city.

Still intent on performing for his parents despite the derailed concert, Ryder confronts Stratmann, but realizes that unlike the rest of his schedule, his parents' visit had been his own initiative. He also learns that his parents visited this city long ago without him ever knowing. Meanwhile, Gustav has died, trusting to the end that Ryder would speak on the porters' behalf. Shrugging off his own negligence, Ryder follows Sophie and Boris to a departing tram. A fellow passenger, reminiscing about Ryder's parents' past visit, fails to remember any impression of Ryder's father, while Sophie finally forsakes Ryder for his absence at Gustav's passing. Ryder is consoled by the fellow passenger, and partakes contentedly in a breakfast buffet being served aboard the tram.

== Characters ==
- Ryder – Renowned concert pianist
- Sophie – Gustav's daughter and Boris's mother
- Boris – Sophie's son
- Gustav – Bellhop of the hotel and Boris's grandfather
- Miss Collins – Former lover of Brodsky
- Hoffman – Manager of the hotel
- Mrs Hoffman – Hoffman's wife; has photo albums dedicated to Ryder
- Stephan – Hoffman's son. Also a pianist, yet is insecure about his parents' disapproval
- Brodsky – Washed up conductor the town tries to revive
- Bruno – Brodsky's deceased dog
- Fiona – Train ticketer, Ryder's childhood friend
- Geoffrey Saunders – Another childhood friend of Ryder. Pops up sporadically throughout the town.
- Miss Stratmann – in charge of planning Ryder's concert
- Christoff – Musician disliked by the town

== Reception ==
The Unconsoled was described as a "sprawling, almost indecipherable 500-page work" that "left readers and reviewers baffled". It received strong negative reviews with a few positive ones. Literary critic James Wood said that the novel had "invented its own category of badness". However, a 2006 poll of various literary critics voted the novel as the third "best British, Irish, or Commonwealth novel from 1980 to 2005", tied with Anthony Burgess's Earthly Powers, Salman Rushdie's Midnight's Children, Ian McEwan's Atonement, and Penelope Fitzgerald's The Blue Flower. John Carey, book critic for the Sunday Times, also placed the novel on his list of the 20th century's 50 most enjoyable books. It has come to be generally regarded as one of Ishiguro’s best works.
