= The Buried Giant =

2015 novel by Kazuo Ishiguro

- UK first-edition cover
- Author: Kazuo Ishiguro
- Audio read by: David Horovitch
- Genre: Fantasy
- Set in: Sub-Roman Britain
- Published: 2015
- Publisher: Faber and Faber (United Kingdom) Random House (United States)
- Publication place: United Kingdom
- Media type: Hardcover
- Pages: 345
- ISBN: 978-0-571-31503-1

The Buried Giant is a fantasy novel by the Nobel Prize–winning British writer Kazuo Ishiguro, published in March 2015.

The novel follows an elderly Briton couple, Axl and Beatrice, living in a fictional post-Arthurian England in which no-one is able to retain long-term memories. The couple have dim memories of having had a son, and they decide to travel to a neighbouring village to seek him out.

The book was nominated for the 2016 World Fantasy Award for best novel, and the 2016 Mythopoeic Award for Adult Literature. It also placed sixth in the 2016 Locus Award for Best Fantasy Novel.

== Plot summary ==
Following the death of King Arthur, Saxons and Britons live in harmony. Along with everyone else in their community, Axl and Beatrice, an elderly Briton couple, suffer from severe selective amnesia that they call the "mist". Although barely able to remember, they feel sure that they once had a son, and they decide to travel to a village several days' walk away to seek him out. They stay at a Saxon village where two ogres have dragged off a boy named Edwin. A visiting Saxon warrior, Wistan, kills the ogres and rescues Edwin who is discovered to have a wound, believed to be an ogre-bite. The superstitious villagers attempt to kill the boy, but Wistan rescues him and joins Axl and Beatrice on their journey, hoping to leave Edwin at the son's village.

The group heads to a monastery to consult with Jonus, a wise monk, about a pain in Beatrice's side. They meet the elderly Sir Gawain, nephew of King Arthur, who – as is well known – was tasked decades ago with slaying the she-dragon Querig, but who has never succeeded. Wistan reveals that he was sent by the Saxon king to slay Querig out of concern that she would be used by Lord Brennus, king of the Britons, to kill Saxons. The travellers are treated with hospitality at the monastery, but are informed by Jonus that most of the monks are corrupt. Sir Gawain has spoken to the abbot, believing he will protect the four. Instead, the abbot informs Lord Brennus, who sends soldiers to murder them. As an experienced warrior, Wistan realises that the monastery was originally built as a fort, and he makes use of its structure to trap and kill the soldiers.

Sir Gawain, riding on alone, recalls how, years earlier, King Arthur had ordered the extermination of many Saxon villages. The massacre had been a betrayal of the peace treaties brokered by Axl, who had at the time been Arthur's envoy (although he has now forgotten it). Arthur also ordered that Querig be brought to the lair where she now lives, and that a spell be cast, turning her breath into an oblivion-inducing mist, causing the Saxons to forget about the massacres.

Axl and Beatrice become separated from Wistan and Edwin, and they travel on alone. They are persuaded by a girl to take a poisoned goat to Querig's lair. Sir Gawain joins them and shows the way. Travelling with Wistan, Edwin has been hearing a voice that he identifies as his lost mother, calling him to her. Wistan realises that Edwin's wound has been caused by a baby dragon, and that Edwin can lead him to Querig. As they approach, Edwin becomes increasingly crazed and has to be restrained.

Sir Gawain reveals that his duty was not in fact to slay Querig, but to protect her in order to maintain the mist. Wistan challenges Gawain to a duel and kills him. He proceeds to slay Querig, causing Edwin's madness to depart and the mist to dissipate, restoring the people's memories. He declares that "the giant, once well buried, now stirs": his action will cause the old animosities between Saxon and Briton to return, leading to a new war.

Axl and Beatrice are finally able to recall that their son had died many years ago of the plague. They meet a ferryman who offers to row the old couple over to an island where they can be close to him in perpetuity. Normally, he says, married couples have to dwell on the island separately and always apart, but in rare cases couples whose love is deep and profound may remain together. The ferryman tells Axl and Beatrice that they qualify, but as they are about to be rowed over, the waves increase and he informs them that he can carry only one person at a time. Axl is suspicious that the ferryman intends to trick them into separating forever, but Beatrice believes the man to be truthful and asks Axl to wait on the shore while she is taken over. Axl reluctantly agrees and walks away without speaking to the boatman.

== Background ==
The Buried Giant took ten years to write, longer than Ishiguro had anticipated. Speaking at the Cheltenham Literature Festival in 2014, he recalled that his wife, Lorna MacDougall, had rejected an early draft of the book, saying: "This won't do ... there's no way you can carry on with this, you'll have to start again from the beginning." Ishiguro added that, at the time, he had been surprised by her comments because he had been pleased with his progress so far. He shelved the novel and wrote a short-story collection, Nocturnes (2009). It was six years before Ishiguro returned to The Buried Giant, and, following his wife's advice, he proceeded to "start from scratch and rebuild it from the beginning".

Ishiguro's inspiration for The Buried Giant came from the Dark Ages in Britain. He told The New York Times that he had wanted to write about collective memory and the way warrior societies cope with traumatic events by forgetting. He ruled out modern historic settings because they would be too realistic and interpreted too literally. The Dark Ages setting solved Ishiguro's problem: "this kind of barren, weird England, with no civilization ... could be quite interesting". He proceeded to research life in England around that time, and discovered, "[t]o my delight ... nobody knows what the hell was going on. It's a blank period of British history". Ishiguro filled in the blanks himself, creating the novel's fantasy setting. For the book's title, he sought his wife's help. After many discarded ideas, they found it near the end of the novel's text. Ishiguro explained, "The giant well buried is now beginning to stir. And when it wakes up, there's going to be mayhem."

== Reception ==
In The Guardian, British author and journalist Alex Preston wrote:

Focusing on one single reading of its story of mists and monsters, swords and sorcery, reduces it to mere parable; it is much more than that. It is a profound examination of memory and guilt, of the way we recall past trauma en masse. It is also an extraordinarily atmospheric and compulsively readable tale, to be devoured in a single gulp. The Buried Giant is Game of Thrones with a conscience, The Sword in the Stone for the age of the trauma industry, a beautiful, heartbreaking book about the duty to remember and the urge to forget.

Not all critics praised the novel, however. James Wood in The New Yorker criticized the work, saying that "Ishiguro is always breaking his own rules, and fudging limited but conveniently lucid recollections."

Ursula K. Le Guin criticized the novel for its treatment of the fantasy genre. She wrote:

I respect what I think he was trying to do, but for me it didn't work. It couldn't work. No writer can successfully use the 'surface elements' of a literary genre — far less its profound capacities — for a serious purpose, while despising it to the point of fearing identification with it. I found reading the book painful. It was like watching a man falling from a high wire while he shouts to the audience, "Are they going to say I'm a tight-rope walker?"

Ishiguro responded to Le Guin's comments, saying: "Le Guin's entitled to like my book or not like my book, but as far as I am concerned, she's got the wrong person. I am on the side of the pixies and the dragons." Le Guin in turn responded, writing, in part: "I am delighted to let Mr Ishiguro make his own case, and to say I am sorry for anything that was hurtful in my evidently over-hasty response to his question 'Will they think this is fantasy?'"

== Audiobook ==
In 2015, Penguin Random House released an audiobook version of the novel, read by David Horovitch.

== Translations ==
The book has been translated into French, German, Spanish, Italian and Portuguese as Le géant enfoui, Der begrabene Riese, El gigante enterrado, Il gigante sepolto and O Gigante Enterrado respectively.

== Film adaptation ==
In January 2023, director Guillermo del Toro revealed in an interview with The Daily Telegraph that he had plans to write, produce and direct a stop-motion animated film adaptation of the novel. In February, the film was officially announced by Netflix Animation and ShadowMachine, with whom del Toro had worked on Pinocchio. Writer Dennis Kelly has joined the project as a screenwriter alongside del Toro.

== Works cited ==
- Ishiguro, Kazuo (2015). The Buried Giant (e-book ed.). London: Faber and Faber. ISBN 978-0-571-31505-5.
