= An Artist of the Floating World =

1986 novel by Kazuo Ishiguro

- First edition
- Author: Kazuo Ishiguro
- Language: English
- Series: None
- Genre: Historical novel
- Publisher: Faber and Faber
- Publication date: 1986
- Publication place: United Kingdom
- Media type: Print (Hardcover, Paperback)
- Pages: 206 pp
- ISBN: 0-571-20913-0
- OCLC: 52638142

An Artist of the Floating World (1986) is a novel by British author Kazuo Ishiguro. It is set in post-World War II Japan and is narrated by Masuji Ono, an ageing painter, who looks back on his life and how he has lived it. He notices how his once-great reputation has faltered since the war and how attitudes towards him and his paintings have changed. The chief conflict deals with Ono's need to accept responsibility for his past actions, rendered politically suspect in the context of post-War Japan. The novel ends with the narrator expressing good will for the young white-collar workers on the streets at lunchbreak. The novel also deals with the role of people in a rapidly changing political environment and with the assumption and denial of guilt.

The novel is considered as both historical fiction and global literature (Weltliteratur); It is considered historical fiction because of its basis in a past that predates the author's own experiences, and it draws from historical facts. It is also classified as global literature due to its broad international market and its theme of how the world today is interconnected.

== Publication history ==
Originally published in 1986, An Artist of the Floating World won the Whitbread Book of the Year Award for best novel and was shortlisted for the Booker Prize. Published by Faber and Faber it is also printed by publishing companies such as Allen and Unwin and Penguin Vintage International. It has additionally become an eBook version and is available on most eBook websites such as kindle and iBooks, since 2012. Currently, An Artist of the Floating World, has been translated into over 40 languages around the world.

== Autobiographical elements ==
Kazuo Ishiguro was born in Nagasaki, Japan in 1954, eventually moving to England at the age of five, only to return to Japan twenty-nine years later. Growing up, Ishiguro had a traditionally Japanese mother, who influenced his writing when reflecting on Japan. Furthermore, his reading of Japanese novels and comics allowed him to stay connected to his Japanese heritage as well as see the differences between Western and Japanese society, influencing his writing through developing a sense of Japanese ideals.

Ishiguro was inspired to write An Artist of the Floating World, after tangentially treating a similar theme in his first novel A Pale View of Hills, which included an old teacher character, who has to rediscover and invent his own morals. Ishiguro's childhood of moving countries and subsequently not feeling completely 'at home' led him to write in a globalised and international way, through which he explored his own background and heritage. Overall, the novel is a reflection of Ishiguro's personal feelings of Japanese heritage, and a fictional reflection of his sense of identity, as presented through a youthful reconstruction of an imagined Japan. One character, the boy Ichiro, has a cowboy obsession, which stems from Ishiguro's own fascination with cowboys during his youth.

== Title ==
The novel's title is based on the literal translation of Ukiyo-e, a word referring to the Japanese art of prints. Therefore, it can be read as "a printmaker" or "an artist living in a changing world," given both Ono's limited understanding and the dramatic changes his world, Japan in the first half of the twentieth century, has undergone in his lifetime.

The title also refers to an artistic genre. Ono's master is especially interested in depicting scenes from the pleasure district adjacent to the villa in which he and his students live. Ono mentions the ephemeral nature of the floating world that could be experienced during each night. His master experiments with innovative softer Western-style painting techniques, rejecting the hard black outlining that was considered more traditional. Under the influence of right-wing political ideas about tradition, Ono becomes estranged from his master and forges his own career. He feels gleeful at the fall of his master's paintings into disfavour during a return to the use of more traditional bold lines in the paintings used for nationalistic posters.

== Structure ==
An Artist of the Floating World, is structured through interwoven memories of the protagonist Masuji Ono. The novel is set in three distinctly different years, although Ono's memories go back to his own childhood, when his father opposed his wish to become an artist. The four different years and title sections of the novel are: October 1948, April 1949, November 1949, and June 1950.

== Plot summary ==
In the buildup to World War II, Ono, a promising artist, breaks away from the teaching of his master, whose artistic aim was to reach an aesthetic ideal in representations of the 'floating world' of night-time entertainments. Ono becomes involved in far-right politics, and begins making propagandistic art. Later, as a member of the Cultural Committee of the Interior Department and official adviser to the Committee of Unpatriotic Activities, Ono becomes a police informer, taking an active part in an ideological witch hunt against a former student, Kuroda. After the 1945 defeat and the collapse of Imperial Japan, Ono becomes a discredited figure, one of the "traitors" who "led the country astray"; meanwhile, the victims of state repression, including people Ono himself had once denounced, are reinstated and allowed to lead a normal life. Over the course of the novel Ono seems to show a growing acknowledgement of his past "errors", although this acknowledgement is never explicitly stated, and his narration is marked by declarations of uncertainty in his memory of past events and a high degree of unreliability.

The book is written in the first person and hinges on the exclusive use of a single, unreliable narrator expressing a viewpoint which the reader identifies as limited and fallible, without any other voice or point of view acting as a test. Ono often makes it clear that he is not sure of the accuracy of his narrative, but this may either make the reader cautious or, on the contrary, suggest that Ono is very honest and, therefore, trustworthy.

The self-image Ono expresses in his narrative is vastly different from the image of him the reader builds from reading the same narrative. Ono often quotes others as expressing admiration and indebtedness to him. Ono's narrative is characterised by denial, so that his interests and his hierarchy of values are at odds with the reader's. Readers, therefore, find that what they are interested in is not the focus of Ono's narrative but at its fringes, presented in an oblique rather than direct fashion. For example, Ono's descriptions of his pictures focus on pictorial technique, mentioning the subjects as if they were unimportant, although they reveal the propagandistic nature of his work. It is not entirely clear whether this focus on style rather than substance should be ascribed to Ono as narrator (showing his retrospective, unconscious embarrassment), or if it was already present in him at the time he was making the pictures (showing that totalitarianism exploits people's capacity to restrain their awareness to limited aspects of their actions). Similarly, when Ono narrates an episode in which he was confronted with the results of his activities as a police informer, it is debatable whether his attempt to mitigate the brutality of the police is a retrospective fabrication devised to avoid his own responsibility, or whether he actually did disapprove of the treatment of the person he had denounced, distancing himself from his actions and refusing to recognise the abusive treatment as a direct and foreseeable consequence of those actions.

== Characters ==
=== Masuji Ono ===
Masuji Ono (小野 益次 Ono Masuji) is the narrator and protagonist of the novel. He is presented as an elderly artist, father and grandfather to his family. Throughout the novel he is concerned with his younger daughter's marriage negotiations. As a child his father was opposed to him becoming a painter, although this is the career he eventually pursues. After rejecting his early studies with Mori-San, Ono works with the nationalist government in the creation of wartime paintings and become the lauded subject of prizes. In the present of the novel his involvement in propaganda has fallen into disrepute, which results in Ono living a conflicting life.

=== Noriko ===
Noriko is Ono's younger daughter. She lives with him in his house and is portrayed by the narrator as sometimes indignant and bad-mannered. She is somewhat bitter to Ono at the beginning of the novel as she suspects her father's past has led to her original marriage arrangement being cancelled. However, she soon becomes enamoured with her second marriage arrangement and is happy when she eventually marries. Noriko views her father, Ono, as someone she must care for forming a small resentment and anger towards him. Noriko is outspoken and boisterous throughout the novel, in contrast with her elder sister Setsuko.

=== Setsuko ===
Setsuko is Ono's elder daughter. She is a quiet and traditional woman, who is married to Suichi and has a son named Ichiro. She and Ono have a solid relationship and she helps him throughout the marriage arrangement proceedings and dealing with his guilt post-war; she acts as his listener. Setsuko and Noriko have a strong, sisterly relationship, despite being quite different temperamentally.

=== Ichiro ===
Ichiro is Ono's grandson, Setsuko's child and Noriko's nephew. In the present of the novel, he is a young boy with an active imagination. To Ono, Ichiro can be confusing and alienating owing to his adoption of Western culture, including some English words and an obsession with cowboys, the movie Godzilla, and eating spinach for strength (a reference to Popeye). Ichiro and Ono nonetheless have a good relationship, and frequently bond over their masculinity.

=== Suichi ===
Suichi is Setsuko's husband and son-in-law to Ono. He represents the new and changing ideals of Japan and is quite outspoken regarding Ono's role in the war. He frequently speaks out about his opinions regarding the war. Before the war he was seen as a well-mannered and happy man, but post-war he has changed into a relatively angry and bitter man as a result of his experiences as a soldier.

=== Kuroda ===
Kuroda was Ono's protégé and student. They initially had a strong relationship, but after Ono disapproved of the direction of Kuroda's art he reported Kuroda to the Committee of Unpatriotic Activities. This results in Kuroda being punished and his paintings burned. Kuroda therefore develops a strong dislike for Ono, and, in the present of the novel, refuses to see Ono again.

=== Shintaro ===
Shintaro is a former student of Ono's who later distances himself from Ono after the war, downplaying or denying Ono’s influence on his career in order to protect his own reputation.

=== Chishu Matsuda ===
Matsuda is a nationalist who encourages Ono to create politicised paintings. He disparages artists who do not deal with social and political issues through their art, considering them to be naïve. After the war, Matsuda becomes a sick and elderly individual who Ono visits. He is quite regretful of remaining unmarried and having no heirs to succeed him but seems not to regret the political aspects of his past.

=== Seiji Moriyama ===
Seiji Moriyama, also known as Mori-san in the novel, is Ono's art teacher during his younger years. He is a strong believer in painting the 'floating world' and teaches students in his villa. His main artistic technique is the abandonment of traditional Japanese techniques such as using dark lines in favour of shading.

=== Dr. Saito ===
Dr Saito is a major art professor with a high social standing who is a long-standing neighbour of Ono. Ono believes Dr Saito is well acquainted with his work, but Setsuko denies this, raising questions as to the validity of Ono's memory.

=== Mrs. Kawakami ===
Mrs. Kawakami is the owner of a bar in the pleasure district that Ono regularly frequents. She is a good friend to Ono. She remains hopeful throughout the novel that the pleasure district will have a resurrection, but this is not the case and by the end of the novel she sells her bar for redevelopment as offices.

=== Yasunari Nakahara ===
Nakahara, also referred to as 'The Tortoise' due to his slow painting, is a friend of Ono's during his youthful days at Mori-san's villa. He is mocked by many of Mori-san's pupils for his slow painting, although Ono defends him. However, after Ono alters his painting style to become politically engaged on the nationalist side, Nakahara distances himself, believing Ono has become a traitor.

== Themes ==
An Artist of the Floating World discusses several themes through the memories of the narrator, Masuji Ono. The analysis of these themes is facilitated through their transcendence of time, allowing the audience's rumination on Ono's experiences, permitting them to judge the narrative objectively.

Among the themes explored in this novel are arranged marriage, the changing roles of women, and the declining status of "elders" in Japanese society since 1945. Many of these themes are interwoven. The novel is narrated by a man who, besides being an artist, is also a father, a grandfather, and a widower. It tells, with a strong voice, much about the "pleasure era" of Japanese society, elaborating on the life of a successful and devoted young artist in a decadent era. The reader learns how attitudes toward Japanese art and society became less tolerant of such extravagance in the wake of Japan's defeat in World War II, and what it was like to live with the guilt of such pleasure, as well as the guilt of having supported political movements now seen as treacherous. The pace is slow and the prose lingers over details.

=== Politicisation of art ===
Art is a central theme of the novel, with Ono's role as a propaganda artist being the chief story line. The novel questions the ability of art to influence and inspire political action within a community. There is a large conflict between whether art should be politicised or whether it should be simply a source of pleasure and gratification. The novel highlights the way politicised art was retrospectively seen as detrimental to society through the impact of the war, but also presents views within which art is conversely seen as ineffectual and unable to influence events, by implying that the war and its subsequent effects would have occurred with or without Ono's propaganda.

=== Unreliable narrator ===
The novel is structured as a series of interwoven memories described by Masuji Ono. Ishiguro uses a variety of techniques to convey the fallibility of Ono's recollections to the audience, gradually revealing that Ono is an unreliable narrator and undermining the audience's faith in his story. For example, Ono makes frequent digressions into unrelated topics and events during his narration, downplaying and concealing his cruel actions and misleading the reader as to the significance of important topics. When Ono recounts interactions with family members, events are often referred to indirectly, or with incomplete information, disguising the truth of what has occurred. Because they are given incomplete and confusing information, it becomes more difficult for the reader to determine the extent of Ono's actions and the responsibility he bears for them.

Masuji Ono repeatedly reassesses events from his past throughout the novel, which suggests that he is constantly reconsidering his guilt about his actions and ultimately rethinking both the role of propaganda and the construction of memories. This process of reassessment highlights his status as an unreliable narrator, emphasising his fickle nature. The narration reflects the concept that memory is processed through an individual's consciousness, making it subjective to that particular person.

=== Responsibility ===
Similar to the theme of the politicisation of art, the novel explores the role of responsibility through the narration of Masuji Ono. There is a conflict between actions and culpability created through Ono's inability to take responsibility for the political aspects of his past work. Ono's deflections of responsibility are evident through his attempt at masking his actions and their subsequent consequences. An Artist of the Floating World makes reference to the liability of leaders after the war and how many of them were not held responsible, a group from which the narrator implicitly disassociates himself.

Alternatively, the concept of responsibility can be considered abstractly. This is done by placing emphasis on the reader to take responsibility in the determining the ending of the novel; is Ono guilty of his actions or is he simply exaggerating his importance and role in the war?

=== Changing values ===
Post-World War II Japan was a time of great change and upheaval of traditional values. Japan's defeat in the war created a large divide between individuals and generations. In the novel, this clash of values is represented in the relationship between Masuji Ono and his grandson Ichiro. Ono represents the traditional values of pre-war Japan, while Ichiro represents post-war Japan and the new generation. Major changes explored include the changing attitudes towards the war, family hierarchy, geography of Japan and the increasing prevalence of Western culture.

Cultural tension is presented through various scenes between Ichiro and Ono, such as their watching of the Godzilla movie, Ichiro's obsession with cowboys and Popeye and his lack of interest in Japanese heroes.

Women are portrayed throughout this novel from the perspective of Ono and well from the perspective of the changing Japanese society around him. The concept of Japanese masculinity altered after Japan's defeat in the war, and while changes were made to the role of women, women's stereotypes were not changed drastically. Gender relations are explored throughout the novel in the plot strand that treats Noriko's quest for a husband.

Marriage negotiations are a central feature of this novel. The marriage negotiations on behalf of his daughter cause Ono to reflect on his past, facilitating the creation of the story. They further facilitate Ono taking responsibility for his past actions, as well as allowing him to reconsider the changing values of Japan as perhaps being positive. They allow Ono to admit his mistakes, progressing the narrative and acting as a literary device.

== Literary significance ==
Iain Maloney listed An Artist of the Floating World as an essential novel for Japanophiles. Robert McCrum ranked it as one of the 100 greatest novels ever written.

The novel was shortlisted for the 1986 Booker Prize and won the Whitbread Book of the Year Award for the same year. It was a nominee for ALA best books for young adults.

The Nobel Foundation, which awarded Ishiguro the 2017 Nobel Prize in Literature, noted in its biography of the author that An Artist of the Floating World was the work that made him "a highly visible young writer".

== Adaptations ==
The novel was adapted into a Japanese television film in 2019. The protagonist was portrayed by Ken Watanabe.
