= Kazuo Ishiguro =

Japanese-British writer and Nobel Laureate (born 1954)

Sir Kazuo Ishiguro CH OBE FRSA FRSL
- 石黒 一雄
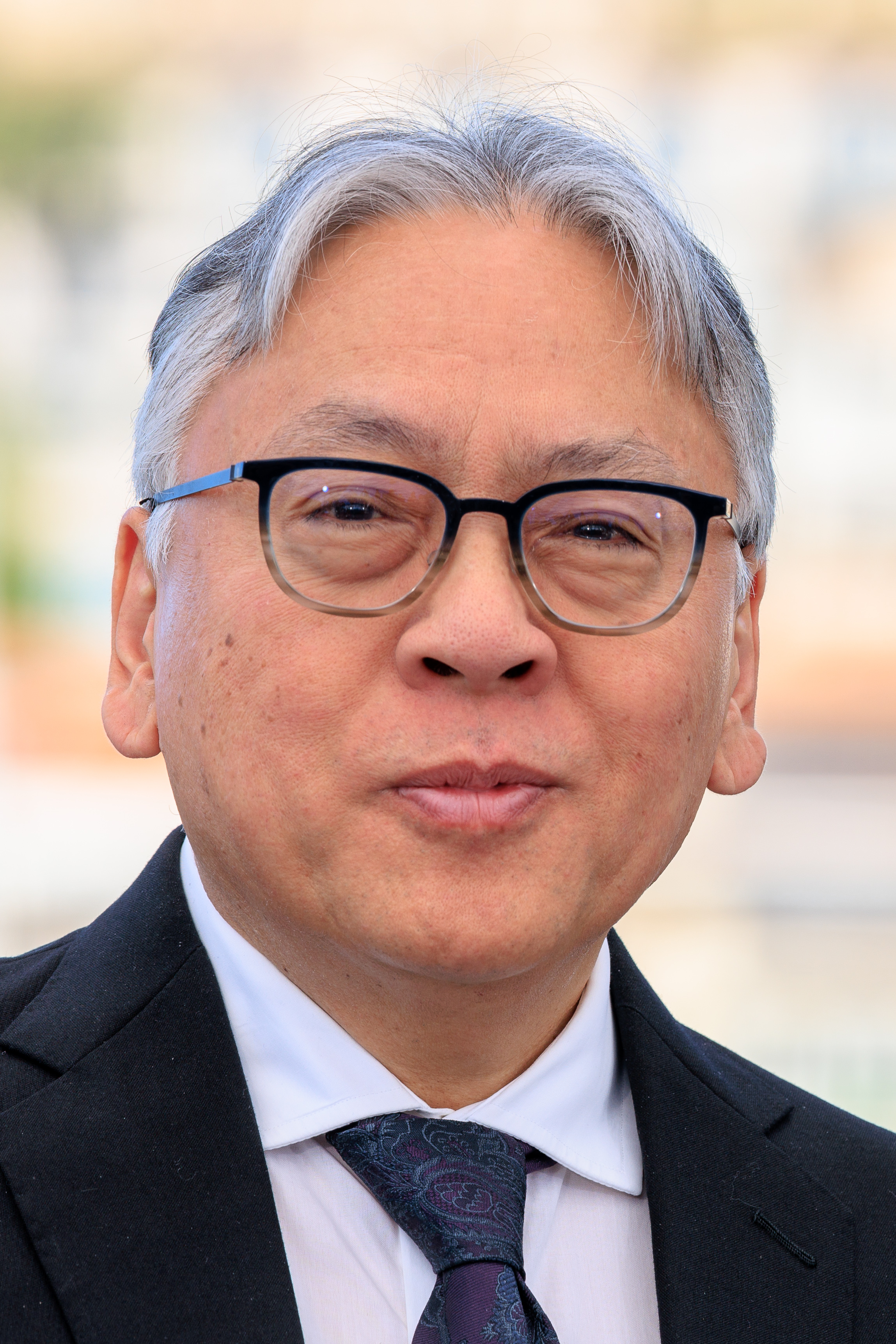
- Ishiguro in 2025
- Born: 8 November 1954 (age 72); Nagasaki, Nagasaki Prefecture, Japan
- Citizenship: Japan (until 1983); United Kingdom (since 1983)
- Education: University of Kent (BA); University of East Anglia (MA)
- Occupations: Novelist; short story writer; screenwriter; columnist; songwriter
- Years active: 1981–present
- Spouse: Lorna MacDougall (m. 1986)
- Children: Naomi Ishiguro
- Awards: Winifred Holtby Memorial Prize 1982 A Pale View of Hills; Whitbread Prize 1985 An Artist of the Floating World; Booker Prize 1989 The Remains of the Day; Nobel Prize in Literature 2017
- Writing career
- Genres: Drama; Historical fiction; Science fiction; Genre fiction
- Notable works: An Artist of the Floating World; The Remains of the Day; When We Were Orphans; Never Let Me Go; Klara and the Sun

Japanese name
- Kanji: 石黒 一雄
- Kana: いしぐろ かずお
Transcriptions
- Romanization: Ishiguro Kazuo

Sir Kazuo Ishiguro (Japanese: 石黒 一雄, Hepburn: Ishiguro Kazuo; /kæˈzuː.oʊ ˌɪʃɪˈɡuroʊ, ˈkæzu.oʊ/; born 8 November 1954) is a Japanese-British novelist, screenwriter, musician, and short-story writer. He is one of the most critically acclaimed contemporary fiction authors writing in English, having been awarded several major literary prizes, including the 2017 Nobel Prize in Literature. In its citation, the Swedish Academy described Ishiguro as a writer "who, in novels of great emotional force, has uncovered the abyss beneath our illusory sense of connection with the world".

Ishiguro was born in Nagasaki, Japan, and moved to Britain in 1960 with his parents when he was five. His first two novels, A Pale View of Hills and An Artist of the Floating World, were noted for their explorations of Japanese identity and their mournful tone. He has since explored themes more typically associated with science fiction and historical fiction, while continuing a focus on the outsider's perspective, the search for an unattainable truth, and the sense of recent history as a spider's web in which humans vainly struggle.

He has been nominated for the Booker Prize four times, winning in 1989 for The Remains of the Day, which was adapted into a film of the same name in 1993. Salman Rushdie praised the novel as Ishiguro's masterpiece, in which he "turned away from the Japanese settings of his first two novels and revealed that his sensibility was not rooted in any one place, but capable of travel and metamorphosis".

Time named Ishiguro's Never Let Me Go as the best novel of 2005 and one of the 100 best English-language novels published between 1923 and 2005. He was nominated for the Academy Award for Best Adapted Screenplay for the 2022 film Living.

== Early life and education ==
Ishiguro was born in Nagasaki, Japan, on 8 November 1954, the son of Shizuo Ishiguro, a physical oceanographer, and his wife, Shizuko. In 1960, Ishiguro moved with his family to Guildford, Surrey, as his father was invited for research at the National Institute of Oceanography (now the National Oceanography Centre). He did not return to visit Japan until 1989, nearly 30 years later, when he was a participant in the Japan Foundation Short-Term Visitors' Programme.

In an interview with Kenzaburō Ōe, Ishiguro stated that the Japanese settings of his first two novels were imaginary: "I grew up with a very strong image in my head of this other country, a very important other country to which I had a strong emotional tie … In England I was all the time building up this picture in my head, an imaginary Japan."

Ishiguro, who has been described as a British Asian author, explained in a BBC interview how growing up in a Japanese family in the UK was crucial to his writing, enabling him to see things from a different perspective from that of many of his English peers.

He attended Stoughton Primary School and then Woking County Grammar School in Surrey. Ishiguro sang solos as a choirboy with his church and school choirs. He also enjoyed music as a teenager, listening to the likes of Leonard Cohen, Joni Mitchell, and particularly Bob Dylan. Ishiguro began learning guitar and writing songs, initially aiming to become a professional songwriter. He says that "for me there's always been big overlap between fiction and song. My style as a novelist comes substantially from what I learnt writing songs. The intimate, first-person quality of a singer performing to an audience, for instance, carried over for me into novels. As did the need to approach meaning subtly, sometimes by nudging it into the spaces between the lines." After finishing school in 1973, he took a gap year and traveled through the United States and Canada, writing a journal and sending demo tapes to record companies. He also worked as a grouse beater, a practice of driven grouse shooting, at Balmoral Castle. Ishiguro later reflected on his ephemeral songwriting career, saying, "I used to see myself as some sort of musician type but there came a point when I thought: actually, this isn't me at all. I'm much less glamorous. I'm one of these people with corduroy jackets with elbow patches. It was a real comedown."

In 1974, he began studies at the University of Kent at Canterbury, graduating in 1978 with a Bachelor of Arts (honours) in English and philosophy. After spending a year writing fiction and working in social care in London, he resumed his studies at the University of East Anglia, taking part in the UEA Creative Writing Course alongside Malcolm Bradbury and Angela Carter. He gained his Master of Arts in 1980.

Ishiguro arrived for his creative writing course with just "one suitcase, a guitar and a portable Olivetti typewriter" and later said "Before I went to East Anglia I had written very little indeed, certainly nothing I would count today as proper writing." His thesis became his first novel, A Pale View of Hills, published in 1982.

He gained British citizenship in 1983.

== Career ==
=== 1982–1994: Literary beginnings and breakthrough ===
Ishiguro set his first two novels in Japan; however, in several interviews, he said that he has little familiarity with Japanese writing and that his works bear little resemblance to Japanese fiction. An Artist of the Floating World (1986) is set in an unnamed Japanese city during the Allied Occupation of Japan following the nation's surrender at the end of World War II. The narrator is forced to come to terms with his part in World War II. He is criticized by the younger generation, who hold him responsible for Japan's misguided foreign policy. As a result, he is compelled to reevaluate his beliefs in light of the modern ideals represented by his grandson. Ishiguro said of his choice of time period, "I tend to be attracted to pre-war and postwar settings because I'm interested in this business of values and ideals being tested, and people having to face up to the notion that their ideals weren't quite what they thought they were before the test came."

In an interview in 1989, when discussing his Japanese heritage and its influence on his upbringing, he stated, "I'm not entirely like English people because I've been brought up by Japanese parents in a Japanese-speaking home. My parents (...) felt responsible for keeping me in touch with Japanese values. I do have a distinct background. I think differently, my perspectives are slightly different." In a 1990 interview, Ishiguro said, "If I wrote under a pseudonym and got somebody else to pose for my jacket photographs, I'm sure nobody would think of saying, 'This guy reminds me of that Japanese writer.'" Although some Japanese writers have had a distant influence on his writing—Jun'ichirō Tanizaki is the one he most frequently cites—Ishiguro has said that Japanese films, especially those of Yasujirō Ozu and Mikio Naruse, have been a more significant influence.

In 1989 he released his book The Remains of the Day, set in the large country house of an English lord in the period surrounding World War II. The book received widespread acclaim as well as the Booker Prize for Fiction. The novel was adapted by Merchant Ivory and made into a 1993 film of the same name starring Anthony Hopkins and Emma Thompson.

=== 1995–2018: Established career and acclaim ===
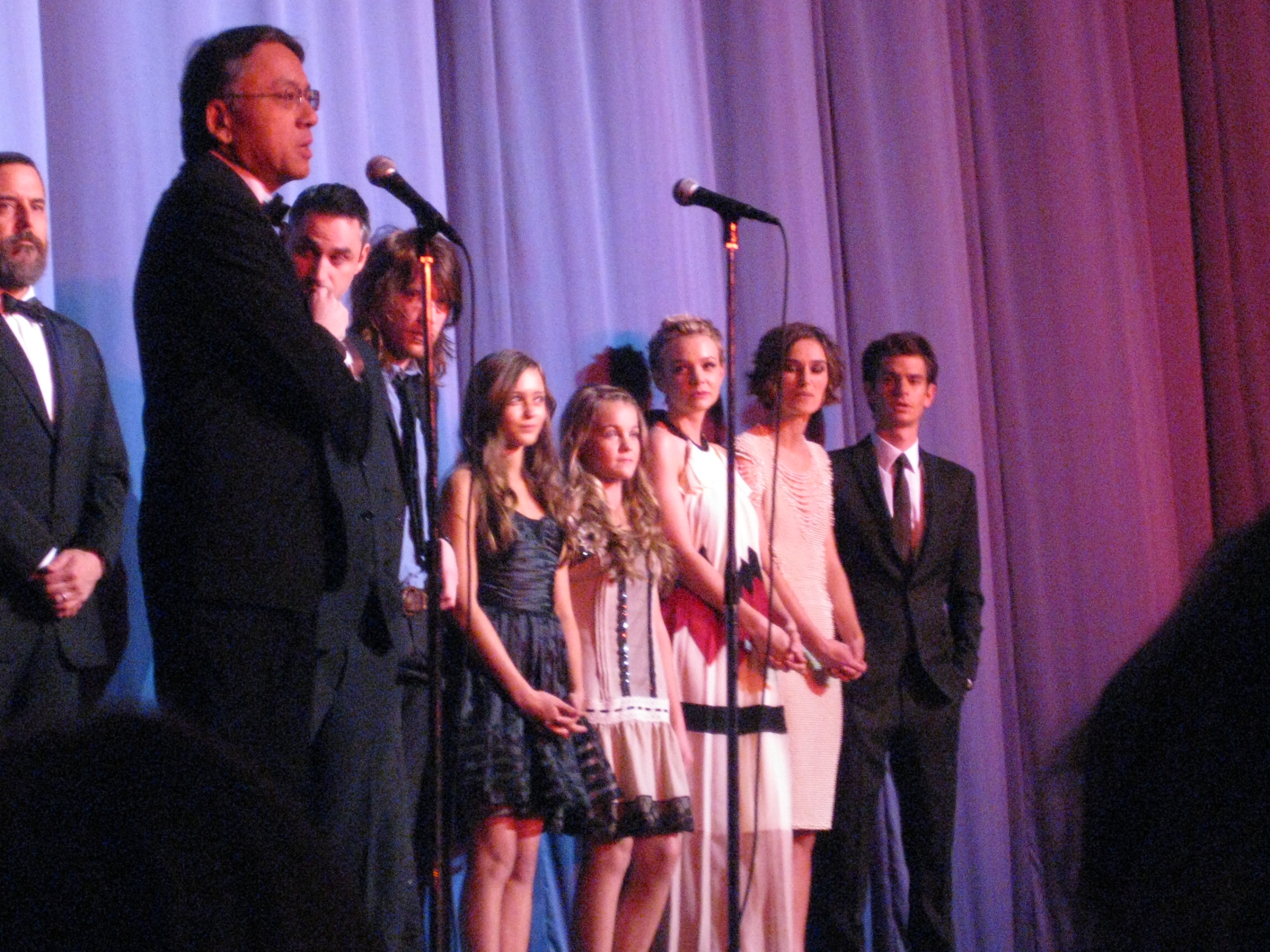
Ishiguro (front) with the cast of the Never Let Me Go film in 2010

His fourth novel, The Unconsoled (1995), takes place in an unnamed Central European city. It received the Cheltenham Prize for Literature. A 2006 poll of various literary critics voted the novel as the third "best British, Irish, or Commonwealth novel from 1980 to 2005", tied with Anthony Burgess's Earthly Powers, Salman Rushdie's Midnight's Children, Ian McEwan's Atonement, and Penelope Fitzgerald's The Blue Flower.

Some of Ishiguro's novels are set in the past. Never Let Me Go (2005) has science fiction qualities and a futuristic tone; however, it is set in the 1980s and 1990s, and takes place in a parallel world very similar to ours. Time magazine named it the best novel of 2005 and included the novel in its "100 Best English-language novels published since 1923". The novel was adapted into the 2010 film of the same name starring Keira Knightley, Andrew Garfield, and Carey Mulligan. With the exception of The Buried Giant (2015), Ishiguro's novels are written in the first-person narrative style.

In 2017, Ishiguro was awarded the Nobel Prize in Literature (see below). Ishiguro was appointed Knight Bachelor for services to literature in the 2018 Birthday Honours and was later appointed to the Order of the Companions of Honour in the 2024 New Year Honours.

=== Nobel Prize in Literature ===
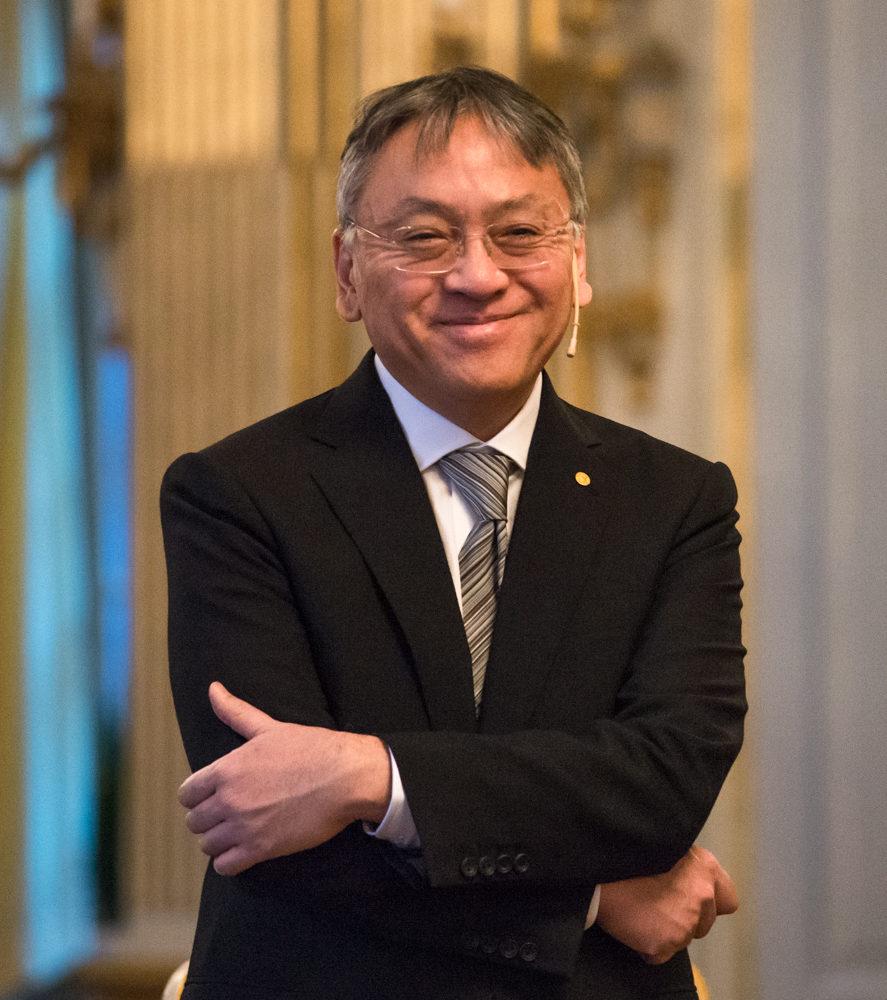
Kazuo Ishiguro at the press conference in Stockholm 6 December 2017

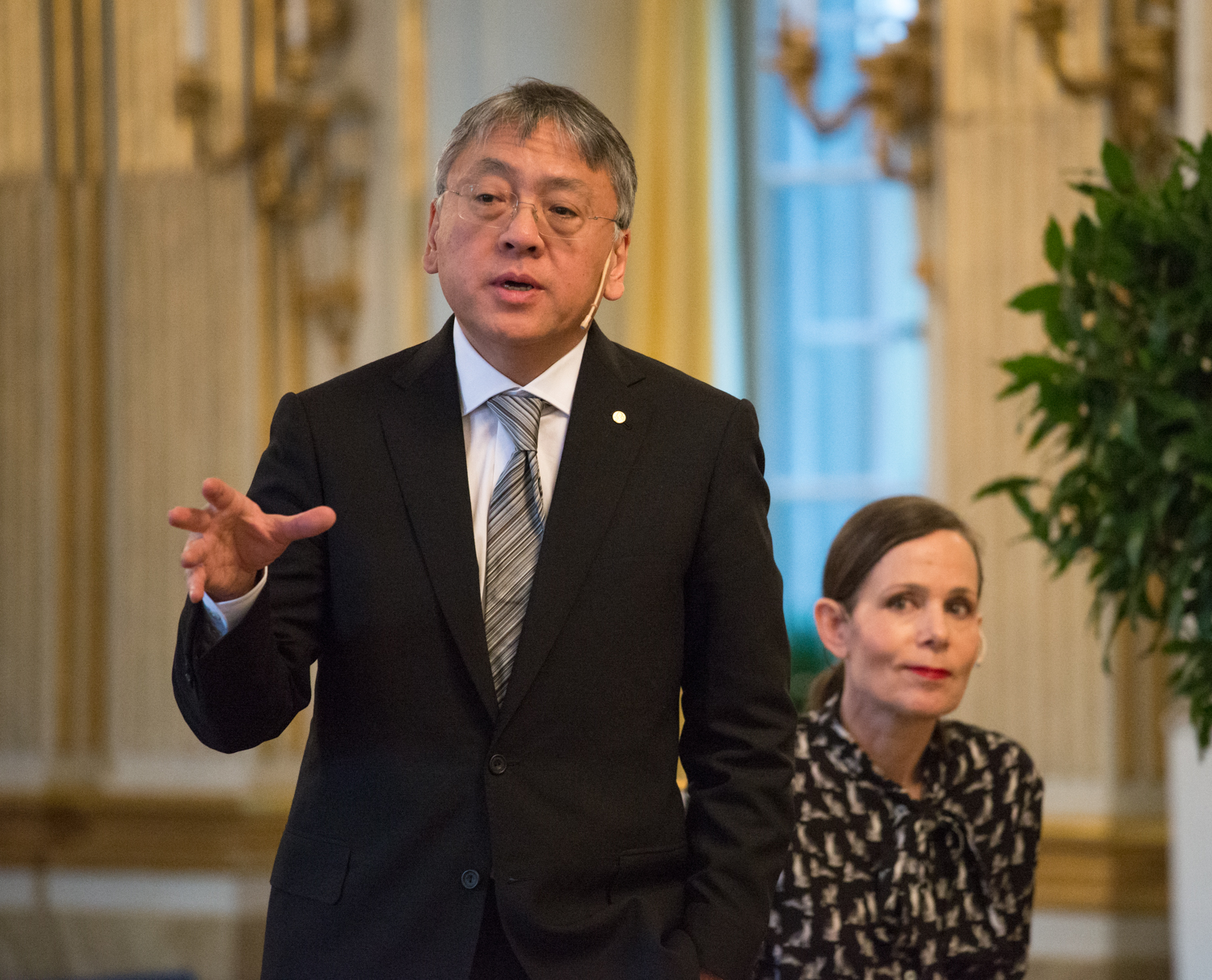
Kazuo Ishiguro with the permanent secretary of the Swedish Academy, Sara Danius

In 2017, Ishiguro was awarded the Nobel Prize in Literature with the motivation "in novels of great emotional force, [he] has uncovered the abyss beneath our illusory sense of connection with the world". Ishiguro was seen as a surprise choice by many observers, but the choice was generally well received. "The Swedish Academy has made some dubious – and last year attention-seeking – decisions in recent years, but this year its 18 voters have got it right", John Mullan, professor of English at University College London, wrote in The Guardian, "It is because he writes for all times, using such carefully controlled means, rigorous yet utterly original, that Ishiguro is such a worthy winner."

Salman Rushdie said “Many congratulations to my old friend Ish, whose work I’ve loved and admired ever since I first read A Pale View of Hills". In response to receiving the award, Ishiguro stated:

It's a magnificent honour, mainly because it means that I'm in the footsteps of the greatest authors that have lived, so that's a terrific commendation. The world is in a very uncertain moment and I would hope all the Nobel Prizes would be a force for something positive in the world as it is at the moment. I'll be deeply moved if I could in some way be part of some sort of climate this year in contributing to some sort of positive atmosphere at a very uncertain time.

At the award ceremony in Stockholm on 10 December 2017, Sara Danius, permanent secretary of the Swedish Academy, compared his writing to 19th century writers such as Jane Austen, Charles Dickens, Charlotte Brontë and George Eliot mixed with influences from Franz Kafka, and said:

Ishiguro too is an innovator, always taking risks. With every new book he investigates a new genre-mix, with elements of the detective story, science fiction, myth ... The window of the novel has always been wide. Ishiguro has widened it even more."

=== 2021–present: Klara and the Sun and Living ===
Ishiguro's eighth novel, Klara and the Sun, was published by Faber and Faber on 2 March 2021. Rumaan Alam of The New Republic wrote it is "more simple than it seems, less novel than parable". It was longlisted for the 2021 Booker Prize. In this novel, narrated from the perspective of an "Artificial Friend" named Klara, he discusses subjects such as the dangers of technological advancement, the future of our world, and the meaning of being human that he also broached in his earlier books.

Ishiguro adapted the screenplay for the 2022 British film Living, directed by Oliver Hermanus and starring Bill Nighy, from the 1952 Japanese film Ikiru directed by Akira Kurosawa. In 2023, Living was nominated for an Academy Award in the Best Adapted Screenplay category.

In 2026, Klara and the Sun was adapted into a science fiction film by Taika Waititi (see Klara and the Sun (film)). The film received overwhelming negative reviews and claims from critics that Waititi 'does not understand Ishiguro's book'. Ishiguro has not commented publicly on the reception to the film adaptation of his novel.

== Musical work ==
Ishiguro has co-written several songs for the jazz singer Stacey Kent with Kent's husband, saxophonist Jim Tomlinson. Ishiguro contributed lyrics to Kent's 2007 Grammy-nominated album Breakfast on the Morning Tram, including its title track, her 2011 album, Dreamer in Concert, her 2013 album The Changing Lights, and her 2017 album, I Know I Dream. Ishiguro also wrote the liner notes to Kent's 2002 album In Love Again. Ishiguro first met Kent after he chose her recording of "They Can't Take That Away from Me" as one of his Desert Island Discs in 2002 and Kent subsequently asked him to write for her.

Ishiguro has said of his lyric writing that "with an intimate, confiding, first-person song, the meaning must not be self-sufficient on the page. It has to be oblique, sometimes you have to read between the lines" and that this realisation has had an "enormous influence" on his fiction writing.

In March 2024, Faber & Faber published Ishiguro's book The Summer We Crossed Europe in the Rain: Lyrics for Stacey Kent, a collection of 16 of his lyrics for Kent, with illustrations by Italian-French artist Bianca Bagnarelli.

== Influences ==
Ishiguro counts Dostoyevsky and Proust among his influences. His works have also been compared to Salman Rushdie, Jane Austen, and Henry James, though Ishiguro himself rejects these comparisons. When asked who his favourite novelist is, he says "Charlotte Brontë's recently edged out Dostoevsky ... I owe my career, and a lot else besides, to Jane Eyre and Villette."

== Personal life ==
Ishiguro has been married to Lorna MacDougall, a social worker, since 1986. They met at the West London Cyreneans homelessness charity in Notting Hill, where Ishiguro was working as a residential resettlement worker. The couple live in Golders Green, North London. Their daughter Naomi Ishiguro is also an author, and has published three books, including the short story collection Escape Routes.

He describes himself as a "serious cinephile" and "great admirer of Bob Dylan". On Desert Island Discs, he chose Dylan's "Tryin' to Get to Heaven" as his favourite song. His book choice was the Collected Short Stories of Anton Chekhov.

Ishiguro has criticized Donald Trump, stating: "In the post-truth Trump era, there’s this relentless attack on accredited news media. It’s not just Trump: it’s a general atmosphere that whatever the evidence, if you don’t like it, you can just claim some alternative emotional truth for yourself. The whole status of what might be true has got very blurred lately." He is also critical of the rise of artificial intelligence, claiming that it "will become very good at manipulating emotions. I think we’re on the verge of that. At the moment we’re just thinking of AI crunching data or something. But very soon, AI will be able to figure out how you create certain kinds of emotions in people – anger, sadness, laughter.”

== Honours and awards ==
=== National or state honours ===
- 1995: Appointed Officer of the Order of the British Empire for services to literature
- 1998: Chevalier de l'Ordre des Arts et des Lettres by the French government
- 2018: Order of the Rising Sun, 2nd Class, Gold and Silver Star by the Japanese government
- 2018: Appointed Knight Bachelor for services to literature
- 2024: Appointed Member of the Order of the Companions of Honour for services to literature

=== Literary awards ===
- 1982: Winifred Holtby Memorial Prize for A Pale View of Hills
- 1986: Whitbread Prize for An Artist of the Floating World
- 1989: Booker Prize for The Remains of the Day
- 1989: Elected Fellow of the Royal Society of Literature
- 2017: Nobel Prize in Literature
- 2017: American Academy of Achievement's Golden Plate Award
- 2019: Bodley Medal

Except for A Pale View of Hills and The Buried Giant, all of Ishiguro's novels and his short story collection have been shortlisted for major awards. Most significantly, An Artist of the Floating World, When We Were Orphans, and Never Let Me Go were all short-listed for the Booker Prize—as was The Remains of the Day, which won it. A leaked account of a judging committee's meeting revealed that the committee found itself deciding between Never Let Me Go and John Banville's The Sea before awarding the prize to the latter.

=== Other distinctions ===
- 1983: Published in the Granta Best Young British Novelists issue
- 1993: Published in the Granta Best Young British Novelists issue
- 2005: Never Let Me Go named on Time magazine's list of the 100 greatest English language novels since the magazine's formation in 1923.
- 2008: The Times ranked Ishiguro 32nd on their list of "The 50 Greatest British Writers Since 1945".
- 2018: Ishiguro was awarded a Knighthood for Services to Literature
- 2023: Living was nominated for the 2023 Academy Award for Best Adapted Screenplay. With the nomination, Ishiguro became the 6th Nobel Prize recipient to earn an Academy Award nomination. Only 2 individuals, George Bernard Shaw and Bob Dylan, have won both. Ishiguro was also nominated for the 2022 BAFTA Award for Best Adapted Screenplay and BAFTA Award for Outstanding British Film.

== Works ==
=== Novels ===
- A Pale View of Hills (1982)
- An Artist of the Floating World (1986)
- The Remains of the Day (1989)
- The Unconsoled (1995)
- When We Were Orphans (2000)
- Never Let Me Go (2005)
- The Buried Giant (2015)
- Klara and the Sun (2021)
- Miss Lambert Steps Aboard Danger (2027)

=== Short-story collections ===
- Nocturnes: Five Stories of Music and Nightfall (2009)

=== Screenplays ===
- A Profile of Arthur J. Mason (television film for Channel 4) (1984)
- The Gourmet (television film for Channel 4) (1987)
- The Saddest Music in the World (2003)
- The White Countess (2005)
- Living (2022)

=== Short fiction ===
- "A Strange and Sometimes Sadness", "Waiting for J" and "Getting Poisoned" (in Introduction 7: Stories by New Writers, 1981)
- "A Family Supper" (in Firebird 2: Writing Today, 1983)
- "Summer After the War" (in Granta 7, 1983)
- "October 1948" (in Granta 17, 1985)
- "A Village After Dark" (in The New Yorker, May 21, 2001)

=== Lyrics ===
- "The Ice Hotel"; "I Wish I Could Go Travelling Again"; "Breakfast on the Morning Tram", and "So Romantic"; Jim Tomlinson / Kazuo Ishiguro, on Stacey Kent's 2007 Grammy-nominated album, Breakfast on the Morning Tram.
- "Postcard Lovers"; Tomlinson / Ishiguro, on Kent's album Dreamer in Concert, (2010).
- "The Summer We Crossed Europe in the Rain"; "Waiter, Oh Waiter", and "The Changing Lights"; Tomlinson / Ishiguro, on Kent's album The Changing Lights (2013).
- "Bullet Train"; "The Changing Lights", and "The Ice Hotel"; Tomlinson / Ishiguro, on Kent's album I Know I Dream: The Orchestral Sessions (2017).
- "The Ice Hotel"; Tomlinson / Ishiguro – Quatuor Ébène, featuring Stacey Kent, on the album Brazil (2013).
- "I Wish I Could Go Travelling Again" (Jim Tomlinson / Kazuo Ishiguro) on Kent's album Songs From Other Places (2021).
- "Craigie Burn", (Jim Tomlinson / Kazuo Ishiguro) on Kent's album Songs From Other Places (2021).
- 'Postcard Lovers" on Kent's album Summer Me, Winter Me (2023).
- The Summer We Crossed Europe in the Rain: Lyrics for Stacey Kent, a collection of 16 of his lyrics for Kent, with illustrations by Italian-French artist, Bianca Bagnarelli.

=== Adaptations ===
- The Remains of the Day (1993 film)
- The Remains of the Day (2010 musical), Union Theatre, London
- Never Let Me Go (2010 film)
- Never Let Me Go (2016 TV miniseries)
- An Artist of the Floating World (2019 TV movie)
- A Pale View of Hills (2025 film)
- Klara and the Sun (2026 film)

== See also ==
- List of Academy Award winners and nominees from Great Britain
