= Bianca Bagnarelli =

Italian artist

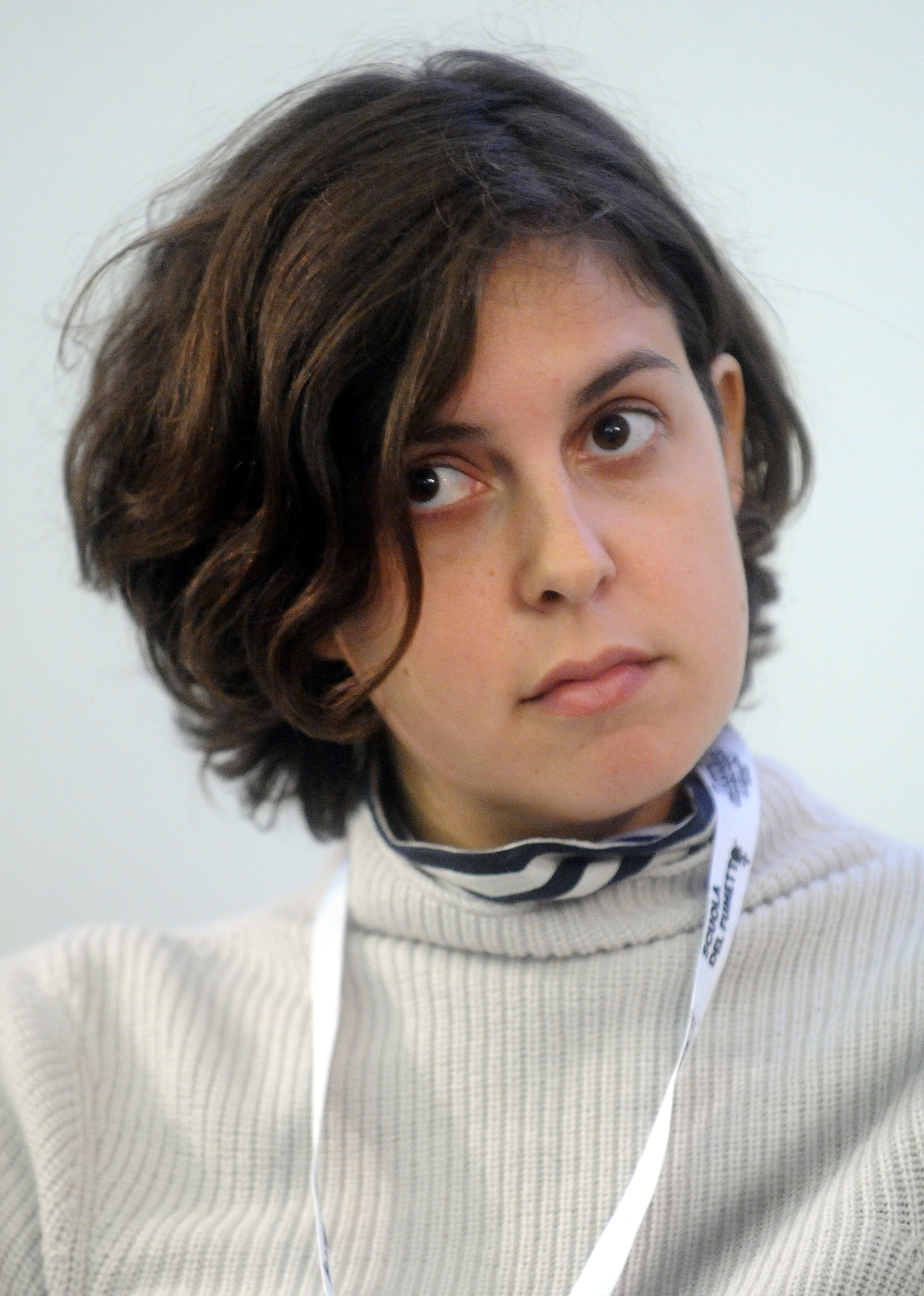
Bagnarelli in 2017

Bianca Bagnarelli (born 21 May 1988 in Milan, Italy) is an Italian artist, writer, illustrator and cartoonist. In 2015, the Society of Illustrators awarded her the gold medal in the short form category of their juried Comic and Cartoon Art Competition for her short graphic novel Fish. In 2016, she won the Lorenzo Bartoli prize for the most promising Italian cartoonist.

Bagnarelli was raised in Milan, and then spent a year studying comics and illustration at the Accademia di Belle Arti di Bologna. In 2010, Bagnarelli founded Delebile, a small independent label that publishes short comic stories by Italian and foreign artists.

Bagnarelli regularly contributes illustrations to The New York Times and The New Yorker. In 2017, she provided the cover art for the fiftieth issue of McSweeney's, and her work was chosen for The New York Times collection "The Year in Illustration 2017". In 2018 she provided illustrations for, among other things, Haruki Murakami's story "The Wind Cave" and an Italian version of Kazuo Ishiguro's story "Crooner" (from his short story collection Nocturnes). In 2020 she contributed a comic and two illustrations to an article in a special issue of National Geographic.

In 2023, Bagnarelli's work first appeared on the cover of The New Yorker.
