= Cheltenham Prize for Literature =

The Cheltenham Prize is awarded at the English Cheltenham Literature Festival to the author of any book published in the relevant year which "has received less acclaim than it deserved".

== Past winners ==
- 1979: Angela Carter for The Bloody Chamber
- 1980: Thomas Pakenham for The Boer War
- 1981: D. M. Thomas for The White Hotel
- 1982: Simon Gray for Quartermaine's Terms
- 1983: Alasdair Gray for Unlikely Stories, Mostly
- 1984: Beatrix Campbell for Wigan Pier Revisited
- 1985: Frank McLynn for The Jacobite Army of England: 1745, The Final Campaign
- 1986: Frank McGuiness for Observe the Sons of Ulster Marching Towards the Somme
- 1987: James Kelman for Greyhound for Breakfast
- 1988: Peter Robinson for The Other Life
- 1989: Medbh McGuckian for On Ballycastle Beach
- 1990: Hilary Mantel for Fludd
- 1991: Marius Kociejowski for Coast
- 1993: R. S. Thomas for Mass for Hard Times
- 1994: Lyndall Gordon for Charlotte Brontë: A Passionate Life
- 1995: Kazuo Ishiguro for The Unconsoled
