= When We Were Orphans =

2000 novel by Kazuo Ishiguro

- First edition
- Author: Kazuo Ishiguro
- Language: English
- Genre: Detective novel
- Set in: Shanghai, London
- Publisher: Faber and Faber
- Publication date: 2000
- Publication place: United Kingdom
- Pages: 313
- ISBN: 0-571-20516-X
- OCLC: 50915706

When We Were Orphans is the fifth novel by Nobel Prize-winning British author Kazuo Ishiguro, published in 2000. It is loosely categorised as a detective novel. When We Were Orphans was shortlisted for the 2000 Booker Prize.

== Plot ==
Christopher Banks, the novel's English narrator, grows up in the Shanghai International Settlement in China during the early 1900s, spending much time playing with his Japanese friend Akira, who lives next door. When he is about ten, his father, who is involved in the British opium trade, mysteriously disappears. Soon after, Christopher is taken on a shopping expedition by his father’s colleague Philip ('Uncle Philip'), who abruptly abandons him in a busy part of the city. Upon returning home, Christopher finds that his mother, an outspoken critic of the opium trade, has also vanished.

Christopher is sent to live with his aunt in England. He receives a regular allowance which pays for his schooling and his Cambridge education. Christopher becomes a successful private detective, becoming well known and much in demand at social gatherings in London. He develops a complex relationship with Sarah Hemmings, a social climber, but never marries, instead choosing to adopt an orphaned girl named Jennifer.

In 1937, Christopher returns to Shanghai to solve what he considers to be the most important case of his life: the disappearance of his parents. Through an old detective, he identifies a house at which his parents may have been held. Reaching it is difficult and dangerous, though, due to the ongoing Second Sino-Japanese War. Christopher tries but fails to meet with someone known as the Yellow Snake, whom he believes to be responsible for his parents' disappearance.

Christopher's memory becomes increasingly unreliable, and the boundaries between fact and imagination begin to evaporate. He convinces himself that if he solves this case, some unspecified world catastrophe will be averted.

Sarah, now unhappily married and living in Shanghai, proposes that they should run away together. She makes all the arrangements, and they meet at a secret location. Christopher says that he has to "pop out for a second", and leaves her waiting while he sets out alone to embark on his personal quest to locate the house. Though the disappearances happened a quarter of a century earlier, Christopher believes that his parents will be there and that nothing whatsoever is as important as finding them. Disregarding all warnings, he persuades the Chinese commander of a war-torn police station to guide him. When the commander realises they are in mortal danger from Japanese soldiers and refuses to go any further, Christopher tells him that he will proceed alone, angrily adding that when he gives his public speech at the official ceremony to celebrate his parents' rescue, he no longer intends to mention the man's name in a complimentary light.

He meets an injured Japanese soldier whom he believes to be his childhood friend Akira. They reach the house, but his parents are not there. Japanese soldiers take them away. As a non-combatant, Christopher is well looked after by his captors, and is released to the British Consulate.

Christopher is at last granted a meeting with the Yellow Snake, who turns out to be his Uncle Philip. Philip tells him that that his father had run away to Hong Kong with his lover and that, a few weeks later, after his mother had insulted the Chinese warlord Wang Ku, she was seized to be the warlord's concubine. Philip had known about the kidnapping and, unable to prevent it, had tried to protect Christopher by making sure he was not present when it took place. He had negotiated with Wang Ku for the boy to be paid an allowance. Christopher learns that his father died of typhoid many years ago, but Philip does not know whether his mother is still alive.

Ten years later, Christopher hears that Sarah is living in Malaya with a French Count. Eventually, he locates his mother, now living under another name in a care home in Hong Kong. When he visits, she does not know who he is, but she does respond when he uses his childhood nickname, "Puffin". He asks her to forgive him, but she is confused as to what Puffin should need forgiveness for. Christopher takes this as confirmation that she has always loved him.

== Reception ==
Despite being short-listed for the Booker Prize, When We Were Orphans was criticised for banality by some reviewers, and Ishiguro himself said that "It's not my best book".

For the Guardian, Philip Hensher wrote that "The single problem with the book is the prose, which, for the first time, is so lacking in local colour as to be entirely inappropriate to the task in hand." He concludes that "The resolution is moving and graceful, but the problem of the voice is a universal one, present and incredible in every sentence".

For the New York Times, Michiko Kakutani said that "Mr. Ishiguro simply ran the notion of a detective story through the word processing program of his earlier novels, then patched together the output into the ragged, if occasionally brilliant, story we hold in our hands."
