= Klara and the Sun =

2021 novel by Kazuo Ishiguro

- First edition
- Author: Kazuo Ishiguro
- Language: English
- Genre: Science fiction; dystopian
- Publisher: Faber and Faber
- Publication date: 2 March 2021
- Publication place: United Kingdom
- Media type: Print
- Pages: 307
- ISBN: 978-0-571-36487-9 (Hardback)
- OCLC: 1158700107
- Dewey Decimal: 823/.914
- LC Class: PR6059.S5 K57 2021
- Website: www.klaraandthesun.com

Klara and the Sun is the eighth novel by the Japanese-British writer Kazuo Ishiguro, published on 2 March 2021. It is a dystopian science fiction story. Set in the U.S. in an unspecified future, the book is told from the point of view of Klara, a solar-powered AF (Artificial Friend), who is chosen by Josie, a sickly child, to be her companion. The novel was longlisted for the 2021 Booker Prize.

== Plot ==
The novel is set in a dystopian future in which some children are genetically engineered ("lifted") for enhanced academic ability. As schooling is provided entirely at home by on-screen tutors, opportunities for socialization are limited and parents who can afford it often buy their children androids as companions. The book is narrated by one such Artificial Friend (AF) called Klara. Although Klara is exceptionally intelligent and observant, her programming strictly limits her knowledge of the world.

From the window of the store in which she is for sale, Klara learns about the world outside and watches the Sun, which she always refers to as "he" and treats as a living entity. As a solar-powered AF, the Sun's nourishment is essential to her. On one occasion she notices that a beggar and his dog are not in their usual position; they are lying like discarded bags and do not move all day. It seems obvious to Klara that they have died, and she is surprised the next morning to see that they are living and that the Sun has with his great kindness saved them with a special kind of nourishment.

Klara comes to fear and hate what she calls the "Cootings Machine" (from the name printed on its side) which stands for several days in the street outside, spewing out pollution that entirely blocks the Sun's rays.

Klara is chosen by 14-year-old Josie, who lives with her mother in a remote region of prairie. Soon after joining them, Klara learns that the lifting process carries some risk: Josie's older sister Sal had earlier died, and Josie herself is gravely ill. Josie's only near neighbour and childhood friend is Rick, a boy of about her own age. Although academically able, Rick has not been lifted and faces discrimination and reduced career prospects. In spite of this, Josie and Rick have always known that they will be together forever.

From Josie's bedroom Klara has a good view of the Sun's progress across the sky, and comes to believe that he goes to his nightly rest within a farmer's barn that stands on the horizon. With Rick's help, she makes her way there one evening across the grasslands. Although surprised to find the Sun's resting place is not actually in the barn, she pleads with him to pour his special kind of nourishment onto Josie and to save her life, as he did the beggar. She offers in return to find and destroy the pollution-creating Cootings Machine.

Josie's mother unexpectedly asks Klara to imitate Josie, which due to her exceptional powers of observation she can do almost perfectly. The mother regularly takes Josie to sit for her portrait, although unknown to her daughter the artist is making not a painting but a highly-accurate AF body. She intends that Klara will integrate her intelligence into it if Josie dies, believing she will become not simply a facsimile but Josie's true continuation.

When Klara next accompanies Josie into town, she finds and destroys the Cootings Machine, sacrificing in the process some of the P-E-G Nine solution she carries in her head and accepting this loss may result in a reduction in her abilities. However, Josie's condition worsens and the Sun does not respond. Klara returns to the barn to make another plea, reminding the Sun of Josie and Rick's genuine and everlasting love. Several days later as Josie seems near death, Klara suddenly sees the dark clouds part as the Sun sends his special nourishment flooding into her sick room. Josie seems better immediately, and over the following months recovers her health.

As Josie grows older, she starts to drift away from Rick. Klara worries that she has misled the Sun, but Rick comforts her. He explains that although his and Josie's paths in life may differ, their love really was genuine and they will always, at some level, be together. Josie leaves for college and says goodbye to Klara.

Settled in a yard for scrapped AFs, Klara can no longer move around but expresses contentment with her spot and declines to socialise with other AFs. The manager of her old store visits, and Klara recounts her happy memories and the Sun's great kindness towards Josie.

== Principal characters ==
- Klara - An Artificial Friend (AF), the protagonist and narrator of the novel
- Josie - Teenage girl for whom Klara is purchased
- Rick - Josie's neighbour and childhood friend
- The Mother (Chrissie) - Josie's mother
- Melania - Housekeeper employed by Josie's family
- The Father (Paul) - Josie's father
- Manager - Unnamed manager who oversees the shop from which Klara is purchased

== Publication ==
Klara and the Sun was published on 2 March 2021 by Faber and Faber (UK) and Alfred A. Knopf (US). It debuted at number six on The New York Times fiction best-seller list for the week ending 6 March 2021.

== Reception ==
In its starred review, Kirkus Reviews compared the novel to Ishiguro's Never Let Me Go and called it a "haunting fable of a lonely, moribund world that is entirely too plausible." Publishers Weekly praised the "rich inner reflections" of Ishiguro's protagonist, writing, "Klara's quiet but astute observations of human nature land with profound gravity." Publishers Weekly proclaims, "This dazzling genre-bending work is a delight."

In a positive review, Cherwell described Ishiguro's novel as characterised by "elegance and poise", praising the narrator Klara as "a memorable first-person narrative voice, simultaneously robotic and infantile, scrupulous yet naïve." The novel's central image of the "paganistic worship of the Sun, nearly to the level of deification, by a purely mechanical vessel" is particularly celebrated. However, the book's inclusion of gene editing was criticised as "overly vague".

In her review for The New York Times, Radhika Jones said that Klara and the Sun returns to the theme of The Remains of the Day as "Ishiguro gives voice to: not the human, but the clone; not the lord, but the servant. Klara and the Sun complements his brilliant vision, though it doesn't reach the artistic heights of his past achievements. . .when Klara says, 'I have my memories to go through and place in the right order', it strikes the quintessential Ishiguro chord."

Anne Enright, writing in The Guardian, found parallels with a different work by the author: "The themes of replication and authenticity are similar to those in Kazuo Ishiguro's Never Let Me Go, published in 2005. Both novels are set in a speculative future that feels quite like the present. Both also contain a secret moral shift: an advance in technology that has changed people's sense of what it is to be human, and the emotional punch of Klara, as with Never Let Me Go, comes from the fact that the central character doesn't know what is going on." Enright added: "The novel requires the reader to ask and settle, over and again, while the philosophical content quietly takes hold. Klara and the Sun is a book about what it is to be human. The fact that Ishiguro can make such huge concerns seem so essential and so simple is just one of the reasons he was awarded the Nobel prize. [...] People will absolutely love this book, in part because it enacts the way we learn how to love. Klara and the Sun is wise like a child who decides, just for a little while, to love their doll. 'What can children know about genuine love?' Klara asks. The answer, of course, is everything."

The Economist praised the book, stating that it effects "a cross between Never Let Me Go and The Remains of the Day, with Klara in the place of Stevens, the butler whose first-person narration provided a between-the-lines portrait of morality among the English upper crust in the interwar years."

The novel was longlisted for the 2021 Booker Prize and the 2022 Andrew Carnegie Medal for Excellence in Fiction. It was selected for The Washington Post's "10 Best Books of 2021" list. The novel was also featured in "The 33 best books of 2021" list in The Times and Barack Obama's summer 2021 reading list.

== Scholarly assessments ==
Below is critical commentary produced pertaining to this novel by scholars.

- Lombardo, William (2021). "Losing Ourselves". The New Atlantis (65): 110–116. JSTOR 27020763.
- Poskanzer, Deborah (2023). "Not Your Father's Turing Test". Issues in Science and Technology. 39 (3): 92–95. doi:10.58875/LYNY2964. JSTOR 27379558.
- Mejia, Santiago; Nikolaidis, Dominique (2022). "Through New Eyes". Journal of Business Ethics. 178 (1): 303–306. doi:10.1007/s10551-022-05062-9. JSTOR 48756223.
- Podgajna, Patrycja (2026). "More Natural than Unnatural? Posthuman Narrators in Ros Anderson's The Hierarchies and Kazuo Ishiguro's Klara and the Sun". Journal of Narrative Theory. 56 (1): 50–73. doi:10.1353/jnt.2026.a991126. JSTOR 27490745.

== Adaptations ==
The novel was read on BBC Radio 4 by actress Lydia Wilson, abridged by Richard Hamilton. It was broadcast in ten parts between 7 March and 19 March 2021.

=== Film ===
In July 2020, Sony's 3000 Pictures acquired the screen rights to the novel. In March 2021, Dahvi Waller was set to write the script, while Ishiguro was set to serve as an executive producer. In May 2023, it was announced that Taika Waititi would direct the film. In February 2024, it was announced that Jenna Ortega was cast as Klara, with Amy Adams as Josie's mother. Mia Tharia and Aran Murphy were later announced to have joined the project as Josie and Rick, respectively. The film premiered on October 15, 2026.

=== Music ===
The novel is one of the main influences for electronic duo Sun Lo's debut album Shapes in My Head. Singer Richard Walters noted the novel as the jumping off point for main idea of the album, and Attlas added that he felt it connected to many of the new ways that AI was becoming a part of people's lives during the pandemic and into the 2020s.
