= Bossa Nova Stories =

2008 studio album by Eliane Elias

Studio album by Eliane Elias
- Released: 24 June 2008
- Studio: Avatar (New York City); Abbey Road (London)
- Genre: Brazilian jazz; bossa nova
- Length: 59:09
- Label: Blue Note
- Producer: Eliane Elias; Steve Rodby

Eliane Elias chronology
Something for You: Eliane Elias Sings & Plays Bill Evans (2008)	Bossa Nova Stories (2008)	Eliane Elias Plays Live (2009)

Professional ratings
Review scores
Source	Rating
AllMusic	4/5 stars
All About Jazz	5/5 stars
The Buffalo News	3/4 stars
Jazzwise	4/5 stars
Tom Hull	B+

Bossa Nova Stories is the nineteenth studio album by Brazilian jazz artist Eliane Elias, released on 24 June 2008 by Blue Note Records. The album is a tribute to celebrate the 50th anniversary of the bossa nova music style.

== Reception ==
Cristophen Loudon of Jazz Times wrote, "Chronologically, she is two years younger than the bossa nova and two years older than Antonio Carlos Jobim and Vinicius de Moraes' iconic 'The Girl From Ipanema,' the song that ignited the worldwide bossa-nova craze. Musically, with her honeyed voice, dense and luxurious as the finest Aubusson carpet, her equally sumptuous appeal as a pianist and her skill for subtle, cozy arrangements, Elias seems the living, breathing extension of the oxymoronic plush minimalism that defines bossa nova."

Ken Dryden of AllMusic stated, "Eliane Elias returns to the music of her native Brazil with this collection of bossa nova favorites, though there are a few American standards and pop songs recast as bossa novas as well. The pianist has grown in confidence as a vocalist over the course of several CDs, developing a sexy yet never overdone style that beautifully complements the music. With her husband Marc Johnson (who has also been her longtime bassist of choice), drummer Paulo Braga, either Oscar Castro-Neves or Ricardo Vogt on acoustic guitar, and a pair of guests, Elias proves herself as a talented singing pianist, effortlessly switching between English and Portuguese lyrics."

== Track listing ==
No.	Title	Writer(s)	Length
1.	"The Girl From Ipanema"	Norman Gimbel	5:22
2.	"Chega de Saudade"	Antônio Carlos Jobim	3:22
3.	"The More I See You"	Mack Gordon / Harry Warren	4:13
4.	"They Can't Take That Away from Me"	George Gershwin / Ira Gershwin	3:47
5.	"Desafinado"	Antonio Carlos Jobim / Newton Mendonça	4:27
6.	"Estate"	Bruno Brighetti / Bruno Martino	5:20
7.	"Day In Day Out"	Rube Bloom / Johnny Mercer	4:21
8.	"I'm Not Alone (Who Loves You?)"	Will Jennings / Ivan Lins	4:50
9.	"Too Marvelous for Words"	Johnny Mercer / Richard A. Whiting	3:55
10.	"Superwoman"	Stevie Wonder	3:39
11.	"Falsa Baiana"	Geraldo Pereira	4:01
12.	"Minha Saudade"		2:11
13.	"A Rã"	Caetano Veloso	4:14
14.	"Day by Day"	Sammy Cahn / Axel Stordahl / Paul Weston	5:27
Total length:			59:09

== Personnel ==
- Eliane Elias – vocals and piano
- Oscar Castro Neves – guitar (except tracks 7 and 13)
- Ricardo Vogt – guitar (tracks 7, 13)
- Marc Johnson – bass
- Paulo Braga – drums and percussion
- Toots Thielemans – harmonica (tracks 6, 10)
- Ivan Lins – vocal (track 8)
- Rob Mathes – orchestra arranging and conducting (tracks 1, 3, 5, 6, 8, 9, 14)

== Charts ==
=== Weekly charts ===
Weekly chart performance for Bossa Nova Stories
Chart (2009)	Peak position
French Albums (SNEP)	47
US Heatseekers Albums (Billboard)	20
US Top Jazz Albums (Billboard)	2
US Traditional Jazz Albums (Billboard)	2

=== Year-end charts ===
Year-end chart performance for Bossa Nova Stories
Chart (2009)	Position
US Top Jazz Albums (Billboard)	47
