= Steve Rodby =

American jazz bassist and producer (born 1954)

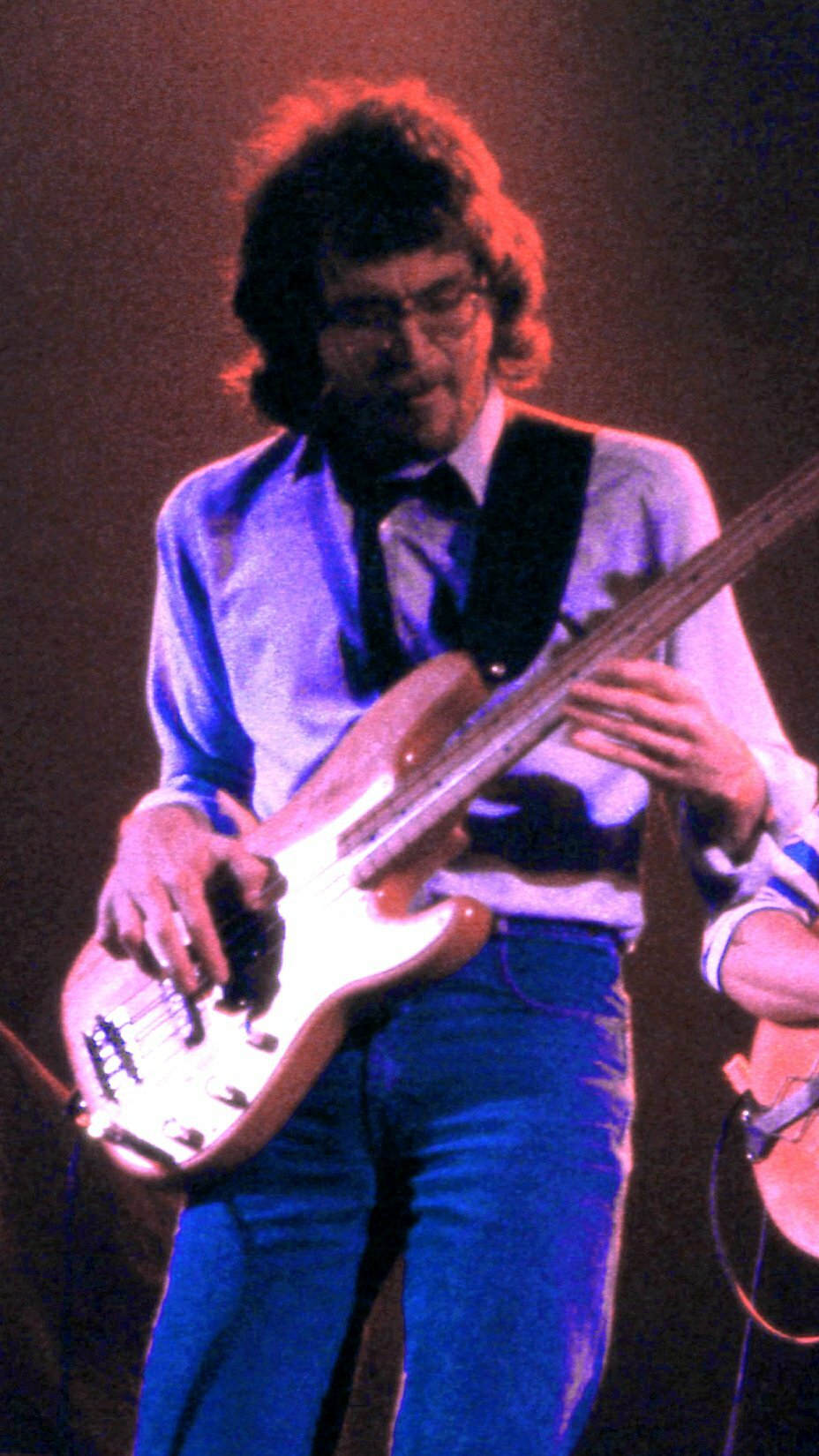
- Rodby performing. Photo by Pino d'Amico

Background information
- Born: December 9, 1954 (age 71); Joliet, Illinois, U.S.
- Genre: Jazz
- Occupations: Musician; producer
- Instrument: Bass
- Years active: 1975–present
- Labels: Geffen; Warner Bros.; Nonesuch; Naim; Basho
- Website: www.steverodby.com

Steve Rodby (born December 9, 1954, in Joliet, Illinois) is an American jazz bassist and producer known for his time with the Pat Metheny Group.

== Biography ==
Rodby was born in Joliet, Illinois, into a musical family. His father was a music teacher who bought him an acoustic bass, electric bass, and amp when he was 12. He heard classical music from a young age and was educated in classical until high school when he learned jazz. During high school summers, he went to jazz camps, where he met Pat Metheny, Lyle Mays, and Danny Gottlieb, three of the original four members of the Pat Metheny Group.

Rodby played acoustic bass until he graduated from Northwestern University in 1977, when he taught himself how to play electric. He performed in the house band at the Jazz Showcase in Chicago, with local and visiting musicians such as Milt Jackson, Joe Henderson, and Art Farmer. He joined the Pat Metheny Group in 1981, starting on electric bass before spending most of his time on acoustic. He spent the next thirty years at Metheny's side, touring, recording, and producing, in Group projects and in Metheny's other projects. With Metheny he earned multiple Grammy awards and nominations, and admiration from critics, magazines, and reader polls.

Rodby collaborated with Fred Simon and Paul McCandless on two albums: Since Forever and Remember the River. In 2011 he collaborated with Paul Wertico, a former drummer for the Metheny Group, and with Israeli musicians Danny Markovitch and Dani Rabin on Marbin's album Breaking the Cycle.

Since 2018, Rodby has held a position as artist of residence in the faculty of Jazz Studies at the University of Washington in Seattle.

== Discography ==
With Ross Traut

- Great Lawn (Columbia, 1987)
- The Duo Life (Columbia, 1991)

== As sideman ==
With Pat Metheny Group

- Offramp (ECM, 1982) – bassist
- Travels (ECM, 1983) – bassist
- First Circle (ECM, 1984) – bassist
- The Falcon and the Snowman (EMI, 1985) – bassist, conductor
- Still Life (Talking) (Geffen Records, 1987) – bassist, co-producer
- Letter from Home (Geffen Records, 1989) – bassist, co-producer
- The Road to You (Geffen Records, 1993) – bassist, co-producer
- We Live Here (Geffen Records, 1995) – bassist, co-producer
- Quartet (Geffen Records, 1996) – bassist, co-producer
- Imaginary Day (Warner Bros, 1997) – bassist, co-producer
- Speaking of Now (Warner Bros, 2002) – bassist, co-producer
- The Way Up (Nonesuch, 2005) – bassist, co-producer

With Pat Metheny

- Secret Story (Geffen Records, 1992) – bassist, co-producer
- A Map of the World (Warner Bros, 1999) – bassist, co-producer
- Trio 99 → 00 (Warner Bros, 2000) – co-producer
- Trio → Live (Warner Bros, 2000) – co-producer
- Day Trip (Nonesuch, 2008) – co-producer
- Tokyo Day Trip (Nonesuch, 2008) – co-producer
- Orchestrion (Nonesuch, 2010) – co-producer
- Unity Band (Nonesuch, 2012) – co-producer
- The Orchestrion Project (Nonesuch, 2013) – co-producer
- KIN (←→) (Nonesuch, 2014) – co-producer
- The Unity Sessions (Nonesuch, 2016) – co-producer
- From This Place (Nonesuch, 2020) − co-producer

With Simon & Bard Group

- Musaic (Flying Fish, 1980) – bassist
- Tear It Up (Flying Fish, 1982) – bassist
- The Enormous Radio (Flying Fish, 1984) – bassist

With Michael Brecker

- Nearness of You: The Ballad Book (Verve Records, 2001) – co-producer
- Pilgrimage (Heads Up, 2007) – co-producer

With Eliane Elias

- Dreamer (Bluebird, 2004) – co-producer
- Something for You: Eliane Elias Sings & Plays Bill Evans (Blue Note, 2007) – co-producer
- Bossa Nova Stories (Blue Note, 2009) – co-producer
- Light My Fire (Concord Picante, 2011) – co-producer
- I Thought About You (Concord Jazz, 2013) – co-producer
- Made In Brazil (Concord Jazz, 2015) – co-producer, recorded
- Dance of Time (Concord Jazz, 2017) – co-producer
- Love Stories (Concord Jazz, 2019) – co-producer
- Mirror Mirror (Candid, 2021) – co-producer
- Quietude (Candid, 2022) – co-producer
- Time and Again (Candid, 2024) – co-producer

With Lyle Mays

- Street Dreams (Geffen Records, 1988) – bassist, co-producer, conductor
- Fictionary (Geffen Records, 1993) – co-producer
- Solo (Improvisations For Expanded Piano) (Geffen Records, 2000) – co-producer
- Eberhard (KMG Distribution, 2021) – bassist, co-producer

With Pat Coil

- Schemes And Dreams (Sheffield Lab, 1994) – bassist, co-producer
- Gold (Sheffield Lab, 1996) – bassist

With Fred Simon

- Usually/Always (Windham Hill Records, 1988) – bassist, producer, editing
- Open Book (Columbia, 1991) – bassist, co-producer
- Remember the River by (Naim, 2004) – bassist
- Since Forever (Naim, 2009) – bassist, producer, editing

With Steve Cole

- Spin (Narada Jazz, 2005) – bassist
- True (Narada Jazz, 2005) – bassist

With Paul McCandless

- Heresay (Windham Hill Records, 1988) – bassist
- Premonition (Windham Hill Records, 1992) – bassist, producer
- Navigator (Landslide Records, 1994) – bassist

With others

- Madelaine, Who Is She... (United Artists Records, 1978) – bassist
- John Prine, Bruised Orange (Asylum Records, 1978) – bassist
- Jimmy Raney, For You To Play . . . Ten Favorite Jazz Standards, Volume 20 (JA Records, 1979) – bassist
- Jamey Aebersold, Gettin' It Together (JA Records, 1979) – bassist
- Ramsey Lewis, Ramsey (Columbia, 1979) – bassist
- Tyrone Davis, I Just Can't Keep On Going (Columbia, 1980) – bassist
- Ross Traut, Ross Traut (Headfirst, 1981) – bassist
- Chuck Mangione, Save Tonight For Me (Columbia, 1986) – bassist
- Tom Paxton, And Loving You (Flying Fish, 1986) – bassist
- Fareed Haque, Voices Rising (PAND, 1988) – bassist
- Toninho Horta, Moonstone (Verve/Forecast, 1989) – bassist
- Montreux, Let Them Say (Windham Hill Records, 1989) – mixing, producer
- Michael Manring, Drastic Measures (Windham Hill Records, 1991) – bassist, producer
- Noa, Noa (Geffen Records, 1994) – bassist, co-producer
- Clifford Carter, Walkin' Into The Sun (Soul Coast, 1994) – bassist
- Kim Pensyl, Quiet Cafe (Fahrenheit Records, 1998) – bassist
- Jim Hall & Pat Metheny, (Telarc, 1999) – co-producer
- Oregon, Oregon in Moscow (Intuition, 2000) – producer
- Brian Culbertson, Come On Up (Warner Bros. Records, 2003) – bassist
- Simon Apple, River To The Sea (Trunk Records, 2004) – bassist
- Lisa Lauren, Loves The Beatles (Planet Jazz Records, 2006) – bassist
- Charlie Haden, Rambling Boy (Universal, 2008) – co-producer
- Esperanza Spalding, Radio Music Society (Heads Up, 2012) – mix preparation
- Ryan Cohan, The River (Motéma Music, 2013) – producer
- Marbin, Last Chapter Of Dreaming (Moonjune Records, 2013) – bassist
- The Impossible Gentlemen, Internationally Recognized Aliens (Basho, 2013) – bassist, producer
- Tyrone Davis, Love And Touch (Solid Records, 2015) – strings
- John Moulder, Earthborn Tales Of Soul And Spirit (Origin Records, 2016) – bassist

== Grammy Awards ==
With Pat Metheny Group:

- Best Jazz Fusion Performance, Vocal or Instrumental – Offramp
- Best Jazz Fusion Performance, Vocal or Instrumental – Travels
- Best Jazz Fusion Performance, Vocal or Instrumental – First Circle
- Best Jazz Fusion Performance, Vocal or Instrumental – Still Life (Talking)
- Best Jazz Fusion Performance – Letter From Home
- Best Contemporary Jazz Performance Instrumental – The Road to You
- Best Contemporary Jazz Performance Instrumental – We Live Here
- Best Contemporary Jazz Performance – Imaginary Day
- Best Rock Instrumental Performance – "The Roots of Coincidence"
- Best Contemporary Jazz Album – Speaking of Now
- Best Contemporary Jazz Album – The Way Up
