= Mirror Mirror (Eliane Elias album) =

Studio album by Eliane Elias
- Released: September 10, 2021
- Studio: The Bunker Studios and Yamaha Artist Services, NYC
- Genre: Jazz
- Length: 47:46
- Label: Candid
- Producer: Eliane Elias, Marc Johnson, Steve Rodby

Eliane Elias chronology
Love Stories (2019)	Mirror Mirror (2021)	Quietude (2022)

Professional ratings
Review scores
Source	Rating
All About Jazz	4.5/5 stars
AllMusic	4/5 stars
The Arts Desk	5/5 stars
DownBeat	4/5 stars
Jazzwise	4/5 stars
Tom Hull	B+

Mirror Mirror is a studio album by jazz pianist Eliane Elias consisting of duets Elias performs with pianists Chick Corea and Chucho Valdés. Candid released the album on September 10, 2021.

== Background ==
Mirror Mirror is the Elias' first piano-only album since her 1995 release Solos and Duets with Herbie Hancock. The present album features an alternating series of duets of Elias with Corea (tracks 1 3 5 7) and Valdés (tracks 2 4 6). In the sleeve-note Elias calls the duets "very special". The compositions are jazz standards and two originals by Corea. As Corea died unexpectedly in February 2021, Elias had to finalise the record with Valdés. Recording took place in New York City at the Yamaha Artist Services in Manhattan with Corea and at the Bunker Studios in Brooklyn with Valdés.

Elias commented, "The title Mirror Mirror wasn't chosen simply because it was one of the songs Chick and I recorded... It was all about the two pianos facing each other like a beautiful mirror image, and how in each duet we reflected each other's thoughts and ideas back and forth. To me, the piano is an extension of my body, heart and soul and is at the centre of everything I do. I will always be proud and grateful for the opportunity to have registered these special musical encounters with these two master musicians."

== Reception ==
Edward Blanco of All About Jazz stated, "Pianist and composer Eliane Elias reveals a wonderful reflection of piano madness on the dazzling Mirror Mirror, capturing the mastery of two piano legends and the fabulous key work of a third legend in the making. One can simply not go wrong listening to the late great Chick Corea and Cuban-born master Chucho Valdes providing amazing call and respond to Elias's own keyboard play. The result is compelling, tasteful, light jazz performed with elegance and grace." Matt Collar of AllMusic added, "Adding to the album's timely atmosphere is the loss of Corea, who died in 2021 soon after the album was recorded. Mirror Mirror is an album of effortless virtuosity rife with a vibrant, in-the-moment energy." Peter Quinn of Jazzwise commented, "Usually combining her mellifluous, understated vocals with her towering pianism, this is Elias's first piano-only recording since her 1995 album with Herbie Hancock, Solos and Duets. It's an album that immediately installs itself as one of the brightest jewels in her remarkable discography." Kira Grunenberg of DownBeat added, "The chemistry between Eliane Elias, Chucho Valdés and Chick Corea on Mirror Mirror is an artistic marvel. Each individual's style is fascinating enough to tempt meticulous analysis, but the album's contextual background encourages an experiential than theory-minded ear."

Mirror Mirror won the Best Latin Jazz Album for the 64th Annual Grammy Awards.

== Track listing ==
No.	Title	Writer(s)	Length
1.	"Armando's Rhumba"	Chick Corea	6:07
2.	"Esta Tarde Vi Llover"	Armando Manzanero	6:26
3.	"Blue Bossa"	Kenny Dorham	5:47
4.	"Corazón Partío"	Alejandro Sanz	11:33
5.	"Mirror Mirror"	Chick Corea	4:53
6.	"Sabor a Mí"	Alvaro Carrillo	6:45
7.	"There Will Never Be Another You"	Harry Warren	6:15
Total length:			47:46

== Personnel ==
Band

- Eliane Elias – piano (tracks 1–7)
- Chick Corea – piano (tracks 1, 3, 5, 7)
- Chucho Valdés – piano (tracks 2, 4, 6)

Production

- Marc Johnson – producer
- Steve Rodby – producer
- Joseph Branciforte – recording engineer
