= Café (musician) =

- Birth name: Edson Aparecido da Silva
- Born: December 31, 1949 (age 75); Vila Maria, São Paulo, Brazil
- Origin: Rio de Janeiro, Brazil
- Genres: Jazz, Afrobeat, Brazilian,
- Occupation(s): Musician, singer, composer
- Instrument: Percussion
- Years active: c. 1975

Café is the stage name of Edson Aparecido da Silva, sometimes credited as Edson da Silva or Café da Silva, a percussionist, singer, composer, and music producer born in Villa Maria, São Paulo, Brazil. He moved to the U.S. in 1985.

He has recorded with Chuck Mangione, Steve Winwood, Jon Lucien, Dave Liebman, Eliane Elias, Rob Mounsey's Flying Monkey Orchestra, Edu Lobo, Batacoto, Gilberto Gil with Ernie Watts, Paquito d'Rivera, David Byrne, Steve Khan, Baden Powell, Tom Harrell, Richard Stoltzman, Joyce Moreno, Judy Niemack, Danny Gottlieb, Herbie Mann, Ana Caram, Bireli Lagrene, James Taylor, Djavan with Stevie Wonder, Sérgio Mendes, Randy Brecker, Nilson Matta, Roni Ben-Hur, and Rachel Portman.

He has appeared with Chico Buarque, Milton Nascimento, Simone, James Last, Philippe Saisse, Sadao Watanabe, the New York Samba Band, Roberta Flack, David Byrne, Tania Maria, Herbie Mann, Larry Coryell, Mor Thiam, Gato Barbieri, Vinx, Pepeu Gomes, Michael Franks, Harry Belafonte, Mick Jagger, Margareth Menezes, Ashford & Simpson with Maya Angelou, Michael Brecker, Paul Winter, Astrud Gilberto, Jose Neto, Betty Buckley, Onaje Allan Gumbs, Alex Foster, Lew Soloff, Manfredo Fest, David Kikoski, Aydin Esen, Vinicius Cantuaria, Claudio Roditi, Tony Cedras, and Dianne Reeves.

He composed the piece "Three Express", which he performed with Nilson Matta, Roni Ben-Hur, and Victor Lewis on their 2011 Motéma Music release, Mojave. The same year, he released his first album as leader, Meditations with the Orishas.

== Biography ==
da Silva was born in Villa Maria in the state of São Paulo. He became interested in percussion at the age of 8 when he heard Afro-Brazilian music at the spiritual gatherings he attended with his parents. He trained classically for the Municipal Orchestra of São Paulo, but began to follow his passion, playing jazz and popular music at clubs. He then studied theatre technique at the Villa Lobos School in Rio de Janeiro and performed for the Ministry of Education and Culture of Brazil in the National Arts Program, "Seis e Meia." In 1980, he began touring with notable jazz artists.

He is a founding member of three music acts, Café Quintet, Fôlia de Reis, and Ave. Brazil. He also manufactures his own metallic percussion instruments for sale to other musicians. He also has his own record label, Café Percussion Records.

== Discography ==
=== As leader ===
- Meditations with the Orishas (2011)

=== As sideman ===
- Djavan – Luz (CBS, 1982)
- Marcio Montarroyos – Samba Solstice (Black Sun, 1993)
- Sérgio Mendes – Sérgio Mendes (A&M, 1983)
- Kleiton & Kledir – Kleiton & Kledir (Ariola, 1983)
- Dalto – Pessoa (EMI, 1983)
- Ivan Lins – Juntos (Philips, 1984)
- Alex Malheiros – Atlantic Forest (Milestone, 1985)
- Bireli Lagrene – Inferno (Blue Note, 1987)
- Danny Gottlieb – Aquamarine (Atlantic, 1987)
- Astrud Gilberto Plus James Last Orchestra (1987)
- Eliane Elias – Cross Currents (Denon, 1988)
- Bernard Lavilliers – O Gringo (Barclay, 1989)
- Danny Gottlieb – Whirlwind (Atlantic, 1989)
- Eliane Elias – So Far So Close (Blue Note, 1989)
- Herbie Mann – Caminho De Casa (Chesky, 1990)
- Joyce – Music Inside (Verve Forecast, 1990)
- Roseanna Vitro – Reaching for the Moon (1991)
- David Byrne – Uh-Oh (Luaka Bop, 1992)
- Sophie B. Hawkins – Tongues and Tails (Columbia, 1992)
- Paul Winter / The Paul Winter Consort – Solstice Live! (Living Music, 1993)
- Eliane Elias – Paulistana (Blue Note, 1993)
- Nando Lauria – Points of View (1994)
- Flying Monkey Orchestra – Mango Theory (Monkeyville, 1995)
- William Galison and Toninho Horta – "Ave Maria" on The Carols of Christmas: A Windham Hill Collection (Windham Hill, 1996)
- Eliane Elias – The Three Americas (Blue Note, 1996)
- Nick Brignola – Poinciana (Reservoir, 1997)
- Eliane Elias – Eliane Elias Sings Jobim (Blue Note, 1998)
- Rachel Portman – Beloved (soundtrack) (1999)
- Saudacão Aos Orixás featuring Vera Mara – Orixás / Pancho / Siku (Ibadan, 1999)
- Chuck Mangione – The Feeling's Back (Chesky, 1999)
- Submission– "Women Beat Their Men" (Dripping Wet, 2000)
- Bernadette Brown – Love Life (2000)
- Nancy Monroe - The Love Within, (mja Records, 2001)
- Nicki Parrott and Lisa Parrott – The Awabakal Suite (2001)
- Michelle Pirret – Somewhere in the World (2002)
- Bob Baldwin – Standing Tall (2002)
- Michael Franks – "Somewhere in the Rain" on Over The Sky – Yuming International Cover Album (Toshiba EMI, 2003)
- Do Swing – Kiroron 1 –Kiroro Melodies– (441, 2003)
- Arkady Shilkloper – Presente Para Moscou (2003)
- Bob Baldwin – Brazil Chill (2004)
- Chris McNulty – Time for Love (2004)
- Gretchen Parlato – Gretchen Parlato (2005)
- Chris McNulty – Dance Delicioso (2005)
- Bob Baldwin – All in a Day's Work (2007)
- Sérgio Mendes – Timeless (Concord, 2008)
- Nilson Matta/Roni Ben-Hur – Mojave (Motéma, 2011)
- Wataru Uchida – Blue Morpho – To Baden Powell with Love (2011)
- Dennis Angel – I Need Smooth Jazz (2011)
- Bob Baldwin - Twenty (2013)
- Bob Baldwin - The Brazilian-American Soundtrack (2016)
- Bob Baldwin - Henna (2020)
- Bob Baldwin - Songs My Father Would Dig (2024)
