= Pedrito Martinez =

American drummer

- Born: September 12, 1973 (age 53); Havana, Cuba
- Genres: Afro-Cuban; Jazz; Latin Jazz; Afro-Beat; Timba
- Occupations: Percussionist, singer
- Instruments: Percussion, bata, cajon, quinto, timbales, maracas, congas, cowbell, shekere, guiro, clave, snare drum, cymbals
- Labels: Motéma, ABKCO, Sony Masterworks, Mack Avenue Records Immediate Family Records
- Website: pedritomartinezmusic.com

Pedrito Martinez is a Cuban percussionist, singer, dancer and songwriter. He was born and raised in Havana, Cuba. He is a Cuban conguero performing classic Cuban rumbas, Afro-Cuban folkloric and religious music. He is a santería priest. He came to the United States of America from Havana in 1998. He plays the batá drum, conga, cajón, timbales, and bongo drums, among other percussion instruments. Pedrito learned his craft from the streets of Havana, Cuba. He has performed with Paquito D'Rivera, Arturo O'Farrill, Brian Lynch, and Bruce Springsteen. He settled in the New York City, New Jersey area, in 1998.

He is a founding member of the band Yerba Buena. They recorded two albums. In 2003, President Alien, and in 2005 their album Island Life was No. 62 on the Billboard Top Latin Albums Chart.

He is a member of the Nuevo Jazz Latino program which is a part of Jazz at Lincoln Center.

Martinez became leader of the Pedrito Martinez Group in 2005. Their first album The Pedrito Martinez Group was released in 2013, with guest artists Wynton Marsalis, John Scofield, and Steve Gadd.

On Martinez's 2016 album titled Habana Dreams, the guest artists were Wynton Marsalis, Ruben Blades, Angélique Kidjo, and Issac Delgado.

== Early life ==
Pedro Pablo "Pedrito" Martinez was born in Havana, Cuba, September 12, 1973 in the Cayo Hueso neighborhood of Old Havana. Cayo Hueso is a neighborhood known for African-derived rumba rhythms. He grew up near the Palacio de la Rumba theater and watched renowned artists rehearse and perform as a child. The house he grew up in was across the street from a park where he became fascinated by men playing percussion, singing and dancing Cuban rumba, a foundational folkloric music and dance with deep roots in Africa. He began his musical career at the age of eleven performing with Cuban artist Tata Guines, and Los Muñequitos de Matanzas as a teenager. Pedrito steeped himself in this style, eventually achieving the status of "rumbero". He was then introduced to Lukumí culture (the culture of Yoruba people in the diaspora) another Afro-Cuban folkloric tradition of great significance. The music of the Lukumí has its own powerful style of music involving ceremonial drums called batá. Martinez mastered the extremely complex rhythms played on the batá as well as the litany of Orisha songs associated with the religion. In 1996, Canadian bandleader Jane Bunnett, while visiting Cuba, had occasion to see Pedrito play and returned two years later to bring him to play in Montreal with her band Spirit of Havana.

== Career ==
By the fall of 1998, Martinez had settled in New York City and very shortly thereafter, won first prize in the prestigious Thelonious Monk Competition for Afro Latin Hand Percussion, presented at the Kennedy Center in Washington, DC. In 2000, he was featured in the important documentary film on Cuban music, "Calle 54". He has performed with Wynton Marsalis, Paquito D'Rivera, Bruce Springsteen, Paul Simon, James Taylor, Sting, Steve Turre, Bill Summers, Cassandra Wilson, Joe Lovano, Brian Lynch (musician), Stefon Harris, Jane Bunnett, Issac Delgado, Eliane Elias, Stefon Harris, Angélique Kidjo, Gonzalo Rubalcaba, Conrad Herwig, Edie Brickell, Rubén Blades, Eddie Palmieri, Esperanza Spalding, Alfredo Rodríguez (pianist born 1985), Elton John, and Los Hombres Calientes and has contributed to well over 50 albums.

Pedrito Martinez was a founding member of the highly successful Afro-Cuban/Afro-Beat band Yerba Buena, which was formed in 2004, and with which he recorded two albums and toured the world. His career as a bandleader, of the Pedrito Martinez Group, began in 2005 in NYC with a four-night a week residency at Guantanamera, a restaurant in midtown Manhattan, where, once word spread, began attracting musicians like Eric Clapton, Paul Simon, Steve Winwood, Taj Mahal, and Roger Waters. The Pedrito Martinez Group, the first album recorded by Pedrito as a leader, was released October 2013 on Motema Music. The album was nominated for a Grammy for Best Latin Jazz Album and was chosen among NPR's Favorite Albums of 2013 and the Boston Globe Critics "Top Ten Albums of 2013". Wynton Marsalis, John Scofield, and Steve Gadd appeared as special guests. Around the same time, an album of flamenco music, Rumba de la Isla was recorded with a different set of musicians, distributed by Sony Masterworks. Habana Dreams, the second album by the Pedrito Martinez Group, was recorded largely in Cuba and was released June 10, 2016 on Motema Music. Guests include Ruben Blades, Issac Delgado, Wynton Marsalis, and Angelique Kidjo. In February 2019, Pedrito Martinez and Cuban pianist, Alfredo Rodriguez released a duo album called Duologue which was selected by NPR for a First Listen: https://www.npr.org/2019/01/24/687794667/first-listen-alfredo-rodr-guez-pedrito-martinez-duologue .

In February 2019, NPR released a performance of the Pedrito Martinez Group that was filmed in January for the Tiny Desk Series. https://www.npr.org/2019/02/14/694731448/the-pedrito-martinez-group-tiny-desk-concert . In February 2021 Martinez announced that he would be releasing a new album entitled 'Acertijos' (Riddles) on March 19 with special guests including Eric Clapton, Jon Faddis, Gilberto Santa Rosa, Isaac Delgado, and more through his label Eshuni Records and Immediate Family Records.

== Credits ==
Year	Album	Artist	Instrument
2025	Ilusión Óptica	The Pedrito Martinez Group, Cory Henry, Yomil y el Dany, Alexander Abreu	Bata, Congas, Cymbals, Keyboard, Piano, Percussion, Vocals, Snare Drum
2021	Acertijos	The Pedrito Martinez Group	Bata, Congas, Percussion, Vocals, Snare Drum
2019	Duologue	Alfredo Rodriguez and Pedrito Martinez	Congas, Bata, Snare drum, Cymbals, percussion, vocals
2017	(U)nity Is Power	New Cuba (U)nity	Featured artist
2017	MONK'estra, Vol. 2	John Beasley	Bata, Congas, Guest Artist
2016	Spirits of Havana/Chamalongo	Jane Bunnett	Vocals
2016	Habana Dreams	The Pedrito Martinez Group	Producer, Liner Notes, Vocals, Congas, Group Member, Arranger, Bata, Composer
2016	New Direction	Herlin Riley	Congas
2016	Cosmic Adventure	Scott Tixier	Congas
2016	Madera Latino: A Latin Jazz Interpretation on the Music of Woody Shaw	Brian Lynch	Congas, Timbales, Soloist
2015	No Limits for Tumbao	Kamarata Jazz / Orozco / César Orozco	Maracas, Vocals (Background), Bongos, Vocals
2015	The Bronx Pyramid	Carlos Henriquez	Bata, Featured Artist
2015	L'ó Dá Fún Bàtá	Román Díaz	Producer, Arranger, Liner Notes, Itotele
2014	Boardwalk Empire, Vol. 3: Music from HBO Series	HBO series	Percussion, Primary Artist
2014	Juice	Medeski	Congas, Guiro
2014	First Class to Havana	Aymee Nuviola	Featured Artist
2013	Far from Finished	Bill Cosby	Congas
2013	La Noche Más Larga	Concha Buika	Percussion, Vocals (Background)
2013	Rumba de la Isla	Pedrito Martínez	Primary Artist, Arranger, Vocals, Congas, Cowbell, Vocals (Background), Chekere, Composer
2013	The Pedrito Martinez Group	The Pedrito Martinez Group	Composer
2013	Elevator Dubs	Umberto Echo	Bata, Percussion
2012	Bamako by Bus	Daniel Freedman	Main Personnel, Cajon, Congas, Featured Artist, Vocals
2013	La Rumba is a Lovesome Thing: A Tribute To Billy Strayhorn	Paul Carlon	Bata, Congas, Vocals
2011	A Foreign Affair	Spyro Gyra	Congas
2011	Chico & Rita	Bebo Valdés	Primary Artist, Vocals
2011	Light My Fire	Eliane Elias	Congas
2010	Amarte	Afrodita / Afrodita	Cajon, Quinto, Shekere, Vocals, Vocals (Background)
2010	Timbasa	Mark Weinstein	Producer, Congas, Bata, Timbales, Percussion, Composer
2009	Ancients Speak	Melvin Gibbs	Vocals
2009	Jazz Clazz	Paquito D'Rivera / Sabine Meyer	Cajon, Percussion
2009	Gives You Now Vs Now	Jason Lindner	Congas, Vocals
2008	In These Shoes	Claudia Acuña / Arturo O'Farrill	Main Personnel, Vocals, Percussion
2007	Con Alma	Mark Weinstein	Main Personnel, Congas
2005	Slave to Africa		
2003	President Alien	Yerba Buena	Composer

== Festivals ==
- 2023 JazzFest Ottawa, Ontario
- 2018 - BRIC JazzFest in Brooklyn, New York
- 2017 - Jazz Fest, New Orleans, Louisiana
- 2017 - Spoleto Festival, Charleston, South Carolina
- 2014-15 - Jazz at Lincoln Center season world premiere of Ochas for a big band with Afro-Cuban percussionist Pedrito Martinez with the Jazz at Lincoln Center Orchestra.
- 2012 - Newport Jazz Festival in Newport, Rhode Island.

== Awards and nominations ==
- 2000 - Thelonious Monk Jazz Competition - Pedrito Martinez - Afro-Latin Hand Drumming Award - 1st place
- 2004 Grammy Awards President Alien (Yerba Buena) - Best Latin Rock, Urban or Alt Album[3] - Nominated
- 2014 Grammy Awards La Noche Más Larga (Concha Buika) - Best Latin Jazz Album[19] - Nominated
- 2016 - Boston Globe's World Music Albums
- 2016 - #1 Latin Jazz Album - NPR Critics Top Jazz Album
