= Love Stories (album) =

Studio album by Eliane Elias
- Released: August 30, 2019
- Studio: Abbey Road Studios; Dissenso Estudios, São Paulo, Brasil; Montauk Studio; Samurai Hotel Studios; Sear Sound
- Genre: Jazz
- Length: 43:35
- Label: Concord Jazz
- Producer: Eliane Elias, Marc Johnson, Steve Rodby

Eliane Elias chronology
Music from Man of La Mancha (2018)	Love Stories (2019)	Mirror Mirror (2021)

Professional ratings
Review scores
Source	Rating
AllMusic	4/5 stars
All About Jazz	4.5/5 stars
DownBeat	5/5 stars
Jazz Journal	2/5 stars
Jazzwise	4/5 stars
Tom Hull	B+

Love Stories is a studio album by Brazilian jazz pianist and singer Eliane Elias. The album was released by Concord on August 30, 2019.

== Background ==
The label's site mentions that Love Stories is an orchestral album, demonstrating Elias’ mastery and preeminence as a multifaceted artist—a vocalist, pianist, arranger, composer, lyricist, and producer. The vocal parts are sung almost entirely in English. The album contains three original compositions as well as seven standards, including songs by Frank Sinatra and Antonio Carlos Jobim, of whom Elias is a celebrated interpreter.

== Reception ==
Kerille McDowall of DownBeat awarded the album five stars out of five and wrote, "Elias’ intoxicating vocals emote the ambient calm of a forest after a soft rain; her vibrancy is a force unto itself. With powerful artistry, her naturally prodigious talent is even stronger as the years pass—a feat capable only by the true elites of the music world." Andrew Gilbert of JazzTimes stated "Intimate and sweeping, Love Stories offers a vivifying reminder of the still unplumbed depths of this particular well, and demonstrates how a master of quietude can transform just about any song into a bossa nova vehicle." Derek Ansell writing for Jazz Journal commented, "...a soft-focus Brazilian crooning style with the strings sweeping around her and the occasional snippet of a brass or reed solo."

== Track listing ==
No.	Title	Writer(s)	Length
1.	"A Man and a Woman"	Pierre Barouh, Jerry Keller, Francis Lai	3:16
2.	"Baby Come to Me"	Rod Temperton	5:12
3.	"Bonita"	Ray Gilbert, Antônio Carlos Jobim, Gene Lees	5:52
4.	"Angel Eyes"	Earl K. Brent, Matt Dennis	5:25
5.	"Come Fly With Me"	Sammy Cahn, James Van Heusen	5:52
6.	"Simplest Things"	Eliane Elias, Marc Johnson	3:59
7.	"Silence"	Eliane Elias, Marc Johnson	4:04
8.	"Little Boat"	Ronaldo Bôscoli, Roberto Menescal	5:48
9.	"The View"	Eliane Elias, Marc Johnson	4:17
Total length:			43:35

== Personnel ==
- Eliane Elias – vocals and piano
- Marc Johnson – bass
- Mark Kibble – background vocals (2)
- Marcus Teixeira – guitar (1–3, 6, 9)
- Daniel Santiago – guitar (2)
- Roberto Menescal – guitar (8)
- Edu Ribeiro – drums (1–3, 9)
- Rafael Barata – drums (5, 8)
- Paulo Braga – drums (4)
- Celso De Almeida – drums (6)
- Rob Mathes – orchestra conductor
