= Made in Brazil (album) =

Studio album by Eliane Elias
- Released: 31 March 2015; 25 March 2015JP
- Studio: Abbey Road Studios, London; NeCena, Sao Paulo, Brasil; Samurai Hotel Studios, NYC
- Genre: Jazz, Brazilian jazz
- Length: 57:39
- Label: Concord Jazz
- Producer: Steve Rodby, Eliane Elias, Marc Johnson

Eliane Elias chronology
I Thought About You (2013)	Made in Brazil (2015)	Dance of Time (2017)

Professional ratings
Review scores
Source	Rating
AllMusic	3.5/5 stars
All About Jazz	5/5 stars
The Buffalo News	2.5/4 stars
Jazz Forum	4/5 stars
Jazzwise	4/5 stars
Tom Hull	B+

Made in Brazil is a 2015 studio album by Brazilian jazz pianist Eliane Elias and the first of her albums in thirty years to be recorded in her home country, Brazil. The album earned Elias a Grammy Award for Best Latin Jazz Album.

== Reception ==
Eric Ford of LondonJazz noted, "Whilst the cover of this CD looks like it might be aiming directly at the easy listening/music for seduction end of the spectrum, the CD itself is a subtle masterclass in phrasing, groove, taste, rhythmic suppleness, harmonic sophistication and songwriting. Three generations of Brazilian songwriters are represented". The Buffalo News review by Jeff Simon noted, "A couple of her solos are impressive here. But at this stage of musical history, with so many classic Bossa Nova and Brazilian music discs available, there is almost no getting around the monotony of the bossa nova over the course of a whole new disc."

Judy Cantor-Navas of Billboard wrote "Sensual and breezy, the set—which includes classics "Waters of March" and "Aquarela do Brasil", as well as six of her own compositions—transmits Elias' delight at recording in her homeland with local musicians."

== Track listing ==
No.	Title	Writer(s)	Length
1.	"Brasil" (Aquarela do Brasil)	Ary Barroso	4:40
2.	"Você"	Ronaldo Bôscoli / Ray Gilbert / Roberto Menescal	5:19
3.	"Águas de março" (Waters of March)	Antônio Carlos Jobim	5:52
4.	"Searching"	Eliane Elias	4:52
5.	"Some Enchanted Place"	Elias / Marc Johnson	5:02
6.	"Incendiando"	Elias / Johnson	4:50
7.	"Vida" (If Not You)	Elias	4:41
8.	"Este Seu Olhar / Promessas"	Antônio Carlos Jobim	3:29
9.	"Driving Ambition"	Elias / Johnson	5:29
10.	"Rio"	Ronaldo Bôscoli / Roberto Menescal	4:50
11.	"A Sorte do Amor" (The Luck of Love)	Elias	3:47
12.	"No Tabuleiro da Baiana"	Ary Barroso	4:48
Total length:			57:39

== Personnel ==
- Eliane Elias – vocals, piano, keyboards, producer
- Marc Johnson – double bass, producer
- Rob Mathes – orchestra, conductor
- Steve Rodby – producer

== Chart positions ==
Chart (2015)	Peak position
French Albums (SNEP)	134
