= Time and Again (Eliane Elias album) =

Studio album by Eliane Elias
- Released: 28 June 2024
- Studios: Dissenso Studio (São Paulo), Em Casa (Rio de Janeiro), Sear Sound (NYC)
- Genre: Jazz
- Length: 38:12
- Label: Candid
- Producers: Eliane Elias; Marc Johnson; Steve Rodby

Eliane Elias chronology
Quietude (2022)	Time and Again (2024)

Professional ratings
Review scores
Source	Rating
All About Jazz	3.5/5 stars
Jazzwise	4/5 stars
Tom Hull	B+

Time and Again is a studio album by Brazilian jazz pianist Eliane Elias. Candid released the album on 28 June 2024. This is her third recording for Candid Records. The album consists of eight tracks: jazz, R&B, and popular song. All the songs are originals written by Elias and her husband Marc Johnson. Elias sings in both English and Brazilian Portuguese.

== Backgroud ==
Time and Again is the Elias's third recording for Candid. It was recorded at Dissenso Studio in São Paulo, with additional recording at Em Casa in Rio de Janeiro and Sear Sound in New York City. The album was produced by Elias alongside her long-standing collaborators Marc Johnson (her partner and recording bassist) and Steve Rodby. This production team has worked with Elias on numerous previous projects, including her Grammy and Latin Grammy Award-winning releases. Also, Time And Again returns to collaboration with arranger Mark Kibble, recreating the rich vibes first heard some nine years ago for the Grammy-winning album Made in Brazil.

Elias sings on the album in both English and Brazilian Portuguese, exploring themes of love, joy, and life's transitions. The album is notable for its collection of eight original compositions, all written by Elias and Johnson. It also includes three tracks that Elias reimagined from her previous instrumental works, infusing them with new lyrics, tempos, and arrangements. This revisiting of earlier material was influenced by her collaboration with poet Vinicius de Moraes, adding emotional lyrical depth to the reworked pieces.

== Reception ==
Edward Blanco of All About Jazz stated, "Whether one is a fan of the Brazilian genre or not, Elias' Time and Again is without question one of the most pleasurable and enticing vocal jazz albums one will encounter without regret." A review by Yoshi's mentioned, "The music on Time and Again reflects the level of artistry and ingenuity Elias has demonstrated throughout her career." Peter Quinn of Jazzwise added that "her latest album Time And Again beautifully showcases her skills as pianist, vocalist, and composer." Blair Ingenthron of BroadwayWorld commented, "Produced by Eliane with her long-standing team of Marc Johnson and Steve Rodby TIME AND AGAIN showcases Elias' exceptional songwriting with 8 original compositions. The music on TIME AND AGAIN reflects the level of artistry and ingenuity Elias has demonstrated throughout her career."

== Track listing ==
Time and Again track listing
No.	Title	Length
1.	"At First Sight"	5:24
2.	"Falo Do Amor"	3:58
3.	"It's Time"	3:56
4.	"How Many Times"	5:27
5.	"Sempre" (featuring Djavan)	4:24
6.	"A Volta"	4:50
7.	"Making Honey"	5:25
8.	"Too Late"	4:48
Total length:		38:12

Music and lyrics for tracks 2 3 5 6 are written by Elias. For tracks 1 4 7 8 music is written by Elias and lyrics is written by Elias and Marc Johnson.

== Personnel ==
- Eliane Elias – keyboards, lyrics, piano, producing, vocals, arranging, composing
- Bill Frisell – guitar
- Conrado Goys – guitar
- Cuca Teixeira – drums
- Daniel Santiago – guitar
- Davi Vieira – percussion
- Djavan – vocals
- Edú Ribeiro – drums
- Marc Johnson – acoustic bass, composing, lyrics, producing
- Marcelo Mariano – electric bass
- Marcus Teixeira – guitar
- Marivaldo Dos Santos – percussion
- Mark Kibble – vocal arrangement, background vocals
- Mike Mainieri – vibraphone
- Peter Erskine – drums
