= Oscar Castro-Neves =

Brazilian guitarist, arranger, and composer

- Photo from official website

Background information
- Born: Carlos Oscar de Castro-Neves; May 15, 1940; Rio de Janeiro, Brazil
- Died: September 27, 2013 (aged 73) Los Angeles, California
- Genres: Bossa nova, Latin jazz, new age
- Occupation: Musician
- Instrument: Guitar
- Years active: 1955–2013
- Formerly of: Paul Winter Consort, Sérgio Mendes

Oscar Castro-Neves (May 15, 1940 – September 27, 2013), was a Brazilian guitarist, arranger, and composer who is considered a founding figure in bossa nova.

== Biography ==
He was born in Rio de Janeiro as one of triplets and formed a band with his brothers in his youth.

At 16 he had a national hit with Chora Tua Tristeza. In 1962 he was in a bossa nova concert at Carnegie Hall, and later he toured with Stan Getz and Sérgio Mendes. He went on to work with musicians from different genres, including Billy Eckstine, Yo Yo Ma, Michael Jackson, Barbra Streisand, Stevie Wonder, João Gilberto, Eliane Elias, Lee Ritenour, Airto Moreira, Toots Thielemans, John Klemmer, Carol Welsman, Stephen Bishop, and Diane Schuur.

During the 1970s and early 1980s he was member of the Paul Winter Consort. With Mendes, Castro-Neves, was a key guitarist in the A&M release "Fool on the Hill" and continued with the classic "Stillness" which was to see the last Brasil '66 grouping. Castro-Neves re-appeared with Sergio Mendes & Brasil 77 on the Vintage '74 album.

He lived in Los Angeles, California where he worked as an orchestrator for several films including Blame it on Rio and Sister Act 2: Back in the Habit.

He died of cancer in Los Angeles on September 27, 2013.

== Discography ==
=== As leader ===
- Tristeza with Luis Bonfa, Lalo Schifrin (Verve, 1963)
- Alaide Costa and Oscar Castro Neves (Odeon, 1973)
- Um Encontro with Lee Ritenour (Evento, 1974)
- Oscar! (Living Music, 1987)
- Brazilian Scandals (JVC, 1987)
- Maracujá (JVC, 1989)
- More Than Yesterday (JVC, 1991)
- Tropical Heart (JVC, 1996)
- Simpatico with John Klemmer (JVC, 1997)
- Brazilian Days with Paul Winter (Living Music, 1998)
- Playful Heart (Mack Avenue, 2003)
- All One (Mack Avenue, 2006)
- Live at Blue Note Tokyo (Zoho, 2012)

=== As sideman ===
With Eliane Elias

- 1996 The Three Americas
- 1998 Eliane Elias Sings Jobim
- 2004 Dreamer
- 2006 Around the City
- 2008 Bossa Nova Stories
- 2011 Light My Fire
- 2013 I Thought About You
- 2022 Quietude

With Antônio Carlos Jobim

- 1974 Elis & Tom
- 1979 Miúcha & Tom Jobim
- 1980 Terra Brasilis

With John Klemmer

- 1977 Arabesque
- 1978 Simpatico
- 1979 Brazilia

With Sergio Mendes

- 1968 Fool on the Hill
- 1969 Crystal Illusions
- 1969 Ye-Me-Lê
- 1970 Stillness
- 1971 Pais Tropical
- 1972 Primal Roots
- 1973 Love Music
- 1976 Homecooking
- 1977 Pelé
- 1977 Sergio Mendes & the New Brasil '77
- 1978 Brasil '88
- 1984 Confetti

With Airto Moreira

- 1986 Aqui Se Puede
- 2003 Life After That

With Flora Purim

- 1974 Stories to Tell
- 1978 Everyday Everynight
- 2001 Perpetual Emotion
- 2003 Speak No Evil

With Lee Ritenour

- 1979 Rio
- 1989 Color Rit
- 2003 World of Brazil

With Diane Schuur

- 2003 Midnight
- 2005 Schuur Fire

With Paul Winter

- 1978 Common Ground
- 1985 Canyon
- 1985 Concert for the Earth
- 1986 Wintersong
- 1987 Earthbeat
- 1998 Brazilian Days
- 2005 Silver Solstice

With others

- 1962 Luiz Bonfá Plays and Sings Bossa Nova, Luiz Bonfá
- 1970 A Bad Donato, João Donato
- 1976 The Best of Two Worlds, Stan Getz
- 1978 Manifestations, Manfredo Fest
- 1978 Tudo Bem!, Joe Pass
- 1979 Dream Master, Bill Hughes
- 1980 This Time, Al Jarreau
- 1981 Cycles, David Darling
- 1981 Ella Abraça Jobim, Ella Fitzgerald
- 1982 Moments Like This, Bobby Short
- 1983 Don Grusin, Don Grusin
- 1987 Brasil, The Manhattan Transfer
- 1988 September Ballads, Mark Murphy
- 1989 Urban Daydreams, David Benoit
- 1992 The Brasil Project, Toots Thielemans
- 1993 The Brasil Project Vol. 2, Toots Thielemans
- 1994 Double Rainbow: The Music of Antonio Carlos Jobim, Joe Henderson
- 1995 Vanessa Rubin Sings, Vanessa Rubin
- 1996 The Heart Speaks, Terence Blanchard
- 2000 Brazil, Rosemary Clooney
- 2003 New York, New Sound, Gerald Wilson
- 2003 The Language of Love, Carol Welsman
