= Quietude (Eliane Elias album) =

Studio album by Eliane Elias
- Released: October 14, 2022
- Recorded: 2019–2020
- Studio: São Paulo
- Genre: Jazz
- Length: 41:29
- Label: Candid
- Producer: Eliane Elias, Marc Johnson, Steve Rodby

Eliane Elias chronology
Mirror Mirror (2021)	Quietude (2022)	Time and Again (2024)

Professional ratings
Review scores
Source	Rating
All About Jazz	4/5 stars
AllMusic	4/5 stars
Jazzwise	4/5 stars
Tom Hull	B+

Quietude is a studio album by Brazilian jazz pianist Eliane Elias. Candid Records released the album on October 14, 2022. DownBeat identifies the record as her 31st album.

== Background ==
The album contains 11 songs mostly recorded in São Paulo during 2019–2020. To record the compositions Elias invited prominent guitarists. Oscar Castro-Neves joined Elias in the studio to record the track "Tim-Tim Por Tim-Tim" before his passing in 2013. All the tracks are sung in Brazilian Portuguese. Elias explained, "I like to make music that I personally would like to hear. This album makes me feel good, at peace and relaxed and I hope that listeners feel the same." She also mentioned that "two current albums of the pandemic moment represent two different facets of her talent. Mirror Mirror was exclusively piano, while Quietude concentrates on her singing."

Elias was born in São Paulo but focuses Quietude on Rio de Janeiro, where bossa nova music was born, and on the northeastern state of Bahia, where some of the great Brazilian composers prospered. She said, "I’ve always had a love affair with Bahia... Brazil’s music came from there, and the best composers live there. And the music is always active with new movements like Tropicalia. Unlike São Paulo, the people are very calm there, the culture is influenced by Africa." For the album’s cover photo Elias also made the point visually by posing relaxingly in a Bahia sunny seaside.

== Reception ==
Marc Myers of The Wall Street Journal wrote "The album’s spare instrumentation places the emphasis on Ms. Elias’s seductive singing voice and the accompanying guitars. Her deep, warm tone imbues songs with a hushed yearning and traces of nostalgia. Most remarkable is that Ms. Elias sings without vocal affectation. Notes aren’t drawn out or fortified with vibrato. Instead, they simply are sung and swung like notes played on a piano without the sustaining pedal, perfectly articulating bossa nova’s syncopated appeal." Michael Major of BroadwayWorld stated, "With her intoxicating vocals on this vibrant bossa nova journey, Eliane has masterfully told these calming musical stories to her listeners. Her artistry demonstrates that alongside her many accolades as a brilliant pianist, Eliane can also wear the crown as the reigning queen of the bossa nova." Matt Collar of AllMusic commented that the "album put Elias' immense jazz, Latin, and classical keyboard skills on display. While she does play some piano here, Quietude intentionally spotlights her voice, pairing the Brazilian-born performer with several of her closest guitar friends on a handful of her favorite songs from her homeland."

JazzTimes included the album in The Top 40 Jazz Albums of 2022, giving it place #33. The album is also a 2023 Latin Grammy nominee as the Best Engineered Album.

== Track listing ==
No.	Title	Writer(s)	Length
1.	"Você e Eu (You and I)"	Carlos Lyra, Vinicius de Moraes	4:54
2.	"Marina"	Dorival Caymmi	3:37
3.	"Bahia Com H (Bahia with H)"	Denis Brean	4:16
4.	"Só Tinha De Ser Com Você (This Love That I've Found)"	Antonio Carlos Jobim	3:02
5.	"Olha (Look)"	Erasmo Carlos, Roberto Carlos	4:20
6.	"Bahia Medley: Saudade Da Bahia / Você Já Foi À Bahia ?"	Dorival Caymmi	5:53
7.	"Eu Sambo Mesmo (I Really Samba)"	Janet de Almeida	3:30
8.	"Bolinha De Papel (Little Paper Ball)"	Geraldo Pereira	2:31
9.	"Tim-Tim Por Tim-Tim"	Haroldo Barbosa, Geraldo Jacques	2:30
10.	"Brigas Nunca Mais (No More Fighting)"	Antonio Carlos Jobim	3:26
11.	"Saveiros"	Nelson Motta, Dori Caymmi	3:30
Total length:			41:29

== Personnel ==
Band

- Eliane Elias – piano, vocals
- Marcus Teixeira – guitar
- Lula Galvão – guitar
- Oscar Castro-Neves – guitar
- Marc Johnson – bass
- Celso de Almeida – drums and percussion
- Paulo Braga – drums and percussion
- Emílio Martins – percussion
- Dori Caymmi – voice

Production

- Rodrigo de Castro Lopes – recording
- Paul Blakemore – mastering
- Pete Karam – mixing
- Gabriel Teixeira – assistant engineer
