= Around the City =

Studio album by Eliane Elias
- Released: August 22, 2006
- Studios: Avatar Studios (New York, New York); Chez Elias (New York, New York); Fun Machine; Henson (Hollywood, California); Magic Shop (New York, New York); Westlake (Los Angeles, California)
- Genre: Brazilian jazz
- Length: 53:37
- Label: RCA Victor
- Producers: Eliane Elias, Lester Mendez, Andres Levin, Stephen Ferrera

Eliane Elias chronology
Dreamer (2004)	Around the City (2006)	Something for You (2008)

Professional ratings
Review scores
Source	Rating
AllMusic	3.5/5 stars
All About Jazz	4.5/5 stars

Around the City is the eighteenth studio album by Brazilian jazz pianist and singer Eliane Elias. It was released on August 22, 2006, by RCA Victor. The track list below is for the European release, which is different from that in the US. The song "Running" form the album was featured on ABC's TV series Brothers and Sisters.

== Recording locations ==
The recording locations for this album were: Avatar Studios, New York; Chez Elias, New York; Fun Machine; Henson Recording Studios, Hollywood; The Magic Shop, New York; and Westlake Audio, Hollywood.

== Reception ==
Patrick Ambrose of The Morning News stated, " In her latest album, Around the City, Elias shows signs she is making the radical change many great artists experience at some point in their careers. With this collection of cover songs and vignettes about city life, Elias has blended the spontaneity of acoustic improvisation with the sculpted perfectionism of the urban-contemporary soundscape." Bridget A. Arnwine of All About Jazz commented, "Elias is creative in her approach on Around the City, where she uses the music to illustrate how the makeup of a city can be a metaphor for life. These songs represent perseverance and forgiveness, fun times and celebration, and love—just as cities include business districts, working-class neighborhoods and all-night party spots."

The album was named Latin Jazz Album of the Year 2007 by Billboard.

== Track listing ==
No.	Title	Writer(s)	Length
1.	"Tropicalia"	Beck Hansen	4:24
2.	"A Vizinha Do Lado (The Next Door Neighbor)"	Dorival Caymmi	3:03
3.	"Save Your Love for Me"	Buddy Johnson	4:01
4.	"Chiclete Com Banana"	Almira Castilho	3:08
5.	"Segredos (Secrets)"	Elias	4:15
6.	"Oye Como Va"	Elias, Tito Puente	4:15
7.	"Slide Show"	Elias, Andres Levin	4:17
8.	"Around the City"	Lauren Christy, Elias, Lester Mendez	4:30
9.	"Jamming"	Bob Marley	5:31
10.	"Running"	Christy, Elias, Mendez	3:49
11.	"We're So Good"	Christy, Elias, Mendez	4:41
12.	"Another Day"	Elias	4:59
13.	"Segredos (Secrets) Part 2"	Elias	2:35
Total length:			53:37

== Chart positions ==
Chart (2006)	Peak position
French Albums (SNEP)	64

== Personnel ==
- Eliane Elias – organ, piano, synthesizer, vocals, producer
- Marc Johnson - double bass
- Adam Rodgers – guitar
- Amanda Elias Brecker – clapping
- Andres Levin – guitar, producer
- Dave Valentin – flute
- Gene Lake – drums
- Gilmar Gomes – percussion
- Oscar Castro-Neves – guitar (acoustic)
- Paulinho Braga – drums
- Paulinho Da Costa – percussion
- Randy Brecker – trumpet
- Vicente Amigo – guitar (acoustic)
