= Dreamer (Eliane Elias album) =

Studio album by Eliane Elias
- Released: May 4, 2004
- Studio: Avatar (New York, New York)
- Genre: Contemporary Jazz
- Length: 53:23
- Label: Bluebird
- Producer: Eliane Elias, Marc Johnson, Steve Rodby

Eliane Elias chronology
Brazilian Classics (2003)	Dreamer (2004)	Around the City (2006)

Professional ratings
Review scores
Source	Rating
AllMusic	3/5 stars
The Penguin Guide to Jazz Recordings	2.5/4 stars

Dreamer is the sixteenth studio album by Brazilian jazz pianist Eliane Elias. It was released on May 4, 2004 by Bluebird. This is the second release on the Bluebird label supported by a full orchestra, with arrangements by conductor Rob Mathes.

== Reception ==
John Bush of Allmusic stated "Her solos, though beautiful and contemplative, are short and usually hug the shore. As an overall musician, Elias has sure instincts when playing or singing, and compensates for her lack of vocal strength by rarely lingering on her notes." A Billboard's reviewer commented, "It's a tasteful album, made so by Elias' seductive, husky vocals, the subtle string orchestration and an overall Brazilian feel." Dave Gelly of The Guardian added, "Superficially, this is a vocal-and-piano album - ballads and bossas with light rhythm accompaniment, plus added colour from a string section - but the minute perfection of touch, timbre and timing sets it apart." Christopher Loudon of JazzTimes wrote, "Elias’ piano work on these 11 tracks is as effortlessly elegant as ever."

== Track listing ==
No.	Title	Writer(s)	Length
1.	"Call Me"	Tony Hatch	4:10
2.	"Baubles, Bangles And Beads"	Alexander Borodin, George Forrest, Robert Wright	5:00
3.	"Photograph (Fotografia)"	Antonio Carlos Jobim, Ray Gilbert	3:45
4.	"Movin' Me On"	Eliane Elias, Marc Johnson	4:08
5.	"So Nice" (Samba de Verão)	Paulo Valle, Marcos Valle, Norman Gimbel	5:13
6.	"That's All"	Alan Brandt, Bob Haymes	5:39
7.	"Tangerine"	Johnny Mercer, Victor Schertzinger	6:42
8.	"Dreamer" (Vivo Sonhando)	Antonio Carlos Jobim, Gene Lees	3:32
9.	"Time Alone"	Eliane Elias	6:38
10.	"Doralice"	Antonio Almeida, Dorival Caymmi	2:57
11.	"A House Is Not a Home"	Burt Bacharach, Hal David	5:20
Total length:			53:23

== Personnel ==
- Eliane Elias – piano, vocals
- Michael Brecker – tenor saxophone
- Mike Mainieri – vibraphone
- Guilherme Monteiro – guitar
- Oscar Castro-Neves – guitar
- Marc Johnson – bass guitar
- Paulo Braga – drums
- Diva Gray – backing vocals
- Martee Lebow – backing vocals
- Vaneese Thomas – backing vocals

== Chart positions ==
Chart (2004)	Peak position
French Albums (SNEP)	37
Belgian Albums (Ultratop Wallonia)	74
