= Something for You: Eliane Elias Sings & Plays Bill Evans =

Studio album by Eliane Elias
- Released: 15 January 2008
- Studios: Avatar (New York, New York)
- Genres: Jazz, post-bop
- Length: 1:03:05
- Label: Blue Note 50999 5 11795 2 6
- Producers: Eliane Elias, Marc Johnson, Steve Rodby

Eliane Elias chronology
Around the City (2006)	Something for You: Eliane Elias Sings & Plays Bill Evans (2008)	Bossa Nova Stories (2008)

Professional ratings
Review scores
Source	Rating
AllMusic	4.5/5 stars
All About Jazz	4.5/5 stars
The Buffalo News	3/4 stars
PopMatters	5/10 stars
The Guardian	4/5 stars
Tom Hull	B+

Something for You: Eliane Elias Sings & Plays Bill Evans is the eighteenth studio album by Brazilian jazz artist Eliane Elias. It was released on 15 January 2008 via the Blue Note label.

== Background ==
This is one of Elias's most critically acclaimed albums, with both AllMusic and All About Jazz giving it 4½ stars out of five. The album includes two Bill Evans compositions recently discovered by her husband, bassist Marc Johnson, on a cassette that Evans gave him shortly before he died: "Evanesque" and "Here Is Something for You." Elias actually recreated "Evanesque" from the elements of Evans's original composition. She also wrote lyrics to the song "Here Is Something for You," incorporating allusions to other tunes and pieces associated with Evans, such as "Time Remembered." She performs vocal parts on six of the seventeen cuts and noted, "I think that I'm more proud of what I've done vocally on this record than anything I've done before." Johnson plays Scott LaFaro's bass on the cover of "My Foolish Heart"; it was the first recording made with that instrument since LaFaro's death in 1961. The final track is Evans's own demo recording of "Here Is Something for You," which segues into Elias's version.

== Reception ==
Doug Ramsey of Jazz Times wrote "Like so many jazz pianists of her generation, Eliane Elias formed her musical sensibility under the spell of Bill Evans. In this collection, she makes plain the extent and depth of his influence as well as her own expressive growth in the three decades since she first heard Evans. She demonstrates both aspects in a reduction of "I Love My Wife." Less than half as long as Evans' 1978 recording, the Elias performance does not reach his rhythmic intensity. But she finds the song's emotional core and manages to approximate on one piano much of the harmonic density and complexity of line that Evans achieved by overdubbing three piano tracks." The Buffalo News review by Jeff Simon noted, "There's certainly a lot of charm to her singing here, as well as her playing."

Ken Dryden of AllMusic noted, "Eliane Elias' return to the Blue Note label after a decade working elsewhere is a triumph. This salute to the late pianist Bill Evans, one of her favorite players, explores a number of songs he recorded, including both standards and originals. Evans' bassist from his final trio, Marc Johnson, is not only a long-time collaborator with Elias but also her husband; drummer Joey Baron rounds out the band. While Elias is influenced by Evans' playing style, his arrangements are only a launching pad for her approach to each tune; never does she sound like an obvious Evans clone."

== Track listing ==
No.	Title	Writer(s)	Length
1.	"You and the Night and the Music"	Arthur Schwartz, Howard Dietz	3:16
2.	"Here Is Something For You"	Eliane Elias, Bill Evans	2:55
3.	"A Sleepin' Bee"	Harold Arlen, Truman Capote	2:49
4.	"But Not for Me"	George Gershwin, Ira Gershwin	3:49
5.	"Waltz for Debby"	Bill Evans, Gene Lees	4:03
6.	"Five"	Bill Evans	4:58
7.	"Blue in Green"	Miles Davis, Bill Evans	4:49
8.	"Detour Ahead"	Herb Ellis, John Frigo, Lou Carter	4:30
9.	"Minha (All Mine)"	Francis Hime, Ruy Guerra	3:10
10.	"My Foolish Heart"	Victor Young, Ned Washington	5:01
11.	"But Beautiful / Here's that Rainy Day"	James Van Heusen, Johnny Burke	4:22
12.	"I Love My Wife"	Cy Coleman, Michael Stewart	2:53
13.	"For Nenette"	Bill Evans	2:50
14.	"Evanesque"	Bill Evans, Eliane Elias	3:20
15.	"Solar"	Miles Davis	3:08
16.	"After All"	Eliane Elias	4:25
17.	"Introduction To "Here Is Something For You""	Bill Evans, Eliane Elias	2:13
Total length:			1:03:05

== Credits ==
Band

- Eliane Elias – piano, vocals, producer
- Marc Johnson – bass, co-producer
- Joey Baron – drums
- Bill Evans – piano (track 17)

Production

- Kaoru Taku – art direction
- Steve Rodby – co-producer
- Ken Arai – coordinator
- Hitoshi Namekata – executive producer
- Don Heckman – liner notes
- Mark Wilder – mastering
- Al Schmidt – recording

== Chart positions ==
Chart (2008)	Peak position
French Albums (SNEP)	56
Spanish Albums (Promusicae)	99
