= Eliane Elias Plays Jobim =

Studio album by Eliane Elias
- Released: 1990
- Recorded: December 1989
- Genre: Contemporary jazz
- Length: 57:43
- Label: Blue Note CDP 7 93089 2
- Producers: Eliane Elias, Randy Brecker

Eliane Elias chronology
So Far So Close (1987)	Eliane Elias Plays Jobim (1990)	A Long Story (1991)

Professional ratings
Review scores
Source	Rating
AllMusic	4/5 stars
Tom Hull	B−
The Penguin Guide to Jazz on CD	2.5/4 stars

Eliane Elias Plays Jobim is the fifth studio album by Brazilian jazz artist Eliane Elias. It was released in 1990 via Blue Note label.

== Background ==
Eliane Elias is considered one of the great interpreters of Antonio Carlos Jobim's music.^{ref?} She has recorded two albums solely dedicated to the works of the composer: Eliane Elias Plays Jobim and Eliane Elias Sings Jobim. The musicians that joined her for this record were Eddie Gomez on bass, Jack DeJohnette on drums, and Nana Vasconcelos on percussion. While most of her records had previously been instrumental, Elias introduced her voice on this album and has employed vocals ever since.

== Reception ==
Alvaro Neder of AllMusic stated, "This is not an album for those die-hard bossa fans. These popular Jobim tunes all were revisited by Elias with the goal of bridging the gap between Brazilian music and jazz; that goal was achieved. She affirms herself in this complex idiom, resulting in an album that can be enjoyed by any jazz connoisseur."

== Track listing ==
No.	Title	Writer(s)	Length
1.	"Waters of March/Agua de Beber"	Antônio Carlos Jobim, Vinicius de Moraes	4:45
2.	"Sabiá"	Chico Buarque, Norman Gimbel, Antônio Carlos Jobim	3:01
3.	"Passarim"	Antônio Carlos Jobim, Paulo Jobim	5:10
4.	"Don't Ever Go Away"	Dolores Durán, Ray Gilbert, Antônio Carlos Jobim	8:26
5.	"Desafinado"	Antônio Carlos Jobim, Gene Lees	6:30
6.	"Angela"	Antônio Carlos Jobim	5:30
7.	"Children's Games"	Antônio Carlos Jobim, Gene Lees	8:51
8.	"Dindi"	Ray Gilbert, Antônio Carlos Jobim	5:45
9.	"Zingaro"	Chico Buarque, Antônio Carlos Jobim	2:23
10.	"One Note Samba"	Jon Hendricks, Antônio Carlos Jobim, Newton Mendonça	4:23
11.	"Don't Ever Go Away"	Dolores Durán, Antônio Carlos Jobim	2:59
Total length:			57:43

== Personnel ==
Band

- Eliane Elias – piano, vocals, editing, producing
- Eddie Gómez – bass
- Jack DeJohnette – drums
- Naná Vasconcelos – percussion

Production

- James Farber – recording engineer
- Malcolm Pollack – editing
- Randy Brecker – producer
- Christine Martin – executive producer
