= Marc Johnson (jazz musician) =

American jazz bass player, composer and band leader

- Born: Marc Alan Johnson; October 21, 1953 (age 72); Omaha, Nebraska, U.S.
- Genres: Jazz
- Occupations: Musician, producer
- Instrument: Double bass
- Labels: Verve, ECM, JMT, Milestone, Blue Note, Concord

Marc Alan Johnson (born October 21, 1953, in Omaha, Nebraska) is an American jazz bass player, composer and band leader. Johnson was born in Nebraska and grew up in Texas. He is married to the Brazilian jazz pianist and singer Eliane Elias.

== Career ==
At the age of 19, Johnson was working professionally with the Fort Worth Symphony, and while at the University of North Texas, he played in the One O'Clock Lab Band and was also the principal bassist in the NTSU Symphony.

In 1978, Johnson joined pianist Bill Evans in what would be Evans's last trio. Johnson toured and recorded with Evans until the death of the pianist in 1980. In 2007 he released the tribute album Something For You—a tribute to Evans—together with his wife, pianist Eliane Elias.

His credits since then include albums with Joe Lovano, Michael Brecker, Stan Getz, Bob Brookmeyer, Gary Burton, John Abercrombie, Bill Frisell, Pat Metheny, Lyle Mays, Eliane Elias, Enrico Pieranunzi, Joey Baron, Philly Joe Jones, Jack DeJohnette, Peter Erskine, Paul Motian, Steps Ahead and many others. He has also appeared as a leader of his own bands, starting with Bass Desires, a quartet that featured Bill Frisell and John Scofield on electric guitar, with Peter Erskine on drums, which gained international recognition following two ECM recordings in the mid-1980s. He also recorded two albums of his group Right Brain Patrol for JMT Records, followed by his Sound of Summer Running release on Verve. His ECM release Shades of Jade was featured in Time's October 17, 2005, issue "5 CDs That Really Swing", as one of the five top jazz releases of the season. It was selected by the Chicago Tribune as one of the 10 best jazz recordings of 2005 and also received the Danish Music Award for Best Foreign Release in 2005. It features his wife Eliane Elias on piano, Joe Lovano on tenor saxophone, John Scofield on guitar and Joey Baron on drums.

As a follow-up to Shades of Jade, in 2012, the ECM recording Swept Away was released. This album is a collaboration with pianist/composer Eliane Elias. It includes Joe Lovano on tenor saxophone and Joey Baron on drums. The music consists of all original compositions. As a producer, Johnson won two Grammy Awards for co-producing Eliane Elias' albums Made in Brazil (2016) and Dance of Time (2017) on Concord Records.

== Discography ==
=== As leader ===
- Bass Desires (ECM, 1986)
- Second Sight (ECM, 1987)
- Two by Four (EmArcy, 1989)
- Right Brain Patrol (JMT, 1992)
- Magic Labyrinth (JMT, 1995)
- The Sound of Summer Running (Verve, 1997)
- If Trees Could Fly (Intuition, 1998)
- Shades of Jade (ECM, 2005)
- Swept Away with Eliane Elias (ECM, 2012)
- Overpass (ECM, 2021)

With John Abercrombie & Peter Erskine

- Current Events (ECM, 1986)
- John Abercrombie / Marc Johnson / Peter Erskine (ECM, 1989)
- November (ECM, 1993)

=== As sideman ===
With John Abercrombie

- Getting There (ECM, 1988)
- Cat 'n' Mouse (ECM, 2002)
- Class Trip (ECM, 2004)
- The Third Quartet (ECM, 2007)

With Patricia Barber

- A Distortion of Love (Antilles, 1992)
- Nightclub (Premonition, 2000)

With Michel Camilo

- Michel Camilo (Portrait 1988)
- On Fire (Epic, 1989)

With Eddie Daniels

- Breakthrough (GRP, 1986)
- Benny Rides Again (GRP, 1992)

With Eliane Elias

- A Long Story (Manhattan, 1991)
- Fantasia ( (Blue Note, 1992)
- Paulistana (Blue Note, 1993)
- The Three Americas (Blue Note, 1997)
- Eliane Elias Sings Jobim (Blue Note, 1998)
- Everything I Love (Blue Note, 1999)
- Kissed by Nature (Bluebird, 2002)
- Dreamer (Bluebird, 2004)
- Portrait of Bill Evans (JVC, 2004)
- Around the City (RCA Victor, 2006)
- Something for You: Eliane Elias Sings & Plays Bill Evans (Somethin' Else, 2007)
- Bossa Nova Stories (Blue Note, 2009)
- Eliane Elias Plays Live (Blue Note, 2010)
- Light My Fire (Concord Picante, 2011)
- I Thought About You (Concord Jazz, 2013)
- Made in Brazil (Concord Jazz, 2015)
- Music from Man of La Mancha (Concord Jazz, 2018)
- Love Stories (Concord, 2019)
- Quietude (Candid, 2022)
- Time and Again (Candid, 2024)

With Peter Erskine

- Motion Poet (Denon, 1988)
- Sweet Soul (Novus/RCA, 1992)
- Behind Closed Doors Vol. 1 (Fuzzy Music, 1998)

With Bill Evans

- Affinity (Warner Bros., 1979)
- We Will Meet Again (Warner Bros., 1980)
- The Paris Concert: Edition One (Elektra Musician, 1983)
- The Paris Concert: Edition Two (Elektra Musician, 1984)
- His Last Concert in Germany (West Wind, 1989)
- Consecration I (Timeless, 1990)
- Consecration II (Timeless, 1990)
- Live in Buenos Aires 1979 (Yellow Note, 1990)
- Someday My Prince Will Come (Alfa, 1991)
- In Buenos Aires Vol. 3 (Jazz Lab, 1991)
- Turn Out the Stars: The Final Village Vanguard Recordings (Dreyfus, 1992)
- Letter to Evan (Dreyfus, 1992)
- Homecoming (Milestone, 1999)
- The Last Waltz: The Final Recordings (Milestone, 2000)
- Complete Live at Ronnie Scott's 1980 (Gambit, 2006)
- Live in Montreal 1980 (2019)

With Stan Getz

- Pure Getz (Concord, 1982)
- Blue Skies(Concord Jazz, 1995)
- Stan Getz Quartet Live in Paris (Dreyfus, 1996)

With Jimmy Gourley

- No More (Musica, 1981)
- The Jazz Trio (Bingow, 1983)
- The Left Bank of New York (Uptown, 1986)

With Woody Herman

- Jazz Jamboree 77 Vol. 2 (Polskie Nagrania Muza, 1977)
- Chick, Donald, Walter & Woodrow (Century, 1978)
- Road Father (Century, 1978)

With Philly Joe Jones

- Advance! (Galaxy, 1979)
- Drum Song (Galaxy, 1985)

With Andy LaVerne

- Plays the Music of Chick Corea (Jazzline, 1988)
- Frozen Music (SteepleChase, 1989)
- True Colors (Jazz City, 1988)

With John Lewis

- The John Lewis Album for Nancy Harrow (Finesse, 1981)
- Kansas City Breaks (Finesse, 1982)
- Slavic Smile (Baystate, 1983)
- J.S. Bach Preludes and Fugues from the Well Tempered Clavier Book 1 (Philips, 1985)
- The Bridge Game Vol. 2 Based On the Well Tempered Clavier Book 1 (Philips, 1986)
- The Garden of Delight Delaunay's Dilemma (EmArcy, 1988)
- Vol. 3 Preludes and Fugues Based On the Well Tempered Clavier Book 1 (Philips, 1989)

With Pat Martino

- Interchange (Muse, 1994)
- Nightwings (Muse, 1996)
- The Maker (Paddle Wheel, 1995)
- Givin' Away the Store (Jazz Heritage Society, 2001)

With Lyle Mays

- Lab' 75! (NTSU Jazz Lab, 1974)
- Lyle Mays (Geffen, 1986)
- Street Dreams (Geffen, 1988)
- The Tale of Peter Rabbit, The Tale of Mr. Jeremy Fisher & The Tale of Two Bad Mice (Windham Hill, 1988)
- Fictionary (Geffen, 1993)
- The Ludwigsburg Concert (Jazzhaus, 2015)

With Wolfgang Muthspiel

- Air, Love & Vitamins (Quinton, 2004)
- Real Book Stories (Quinton, 2001)
- Perspective (Amadeo, 1996)

With Enrico Pieranunzi

- Deep Down (Soul Note, 1987)
- No Man's Land (Soul Note, 1990)
- The Dream Before Us (IDA, 1992)
- In That Dawn of Music (Soul Note, 1993)
- Untold Story (IDA, 1994)
- The Night Gone by (Alfa, 1996)
- The Chant of Time (Alfa, 1997)
- Racconti Mediterranei (Egea, 2000)
- Play Morricone (CAM Jazz, 2001)
- Current Conditions (CAM Jazz, 2003)
- Trasnoche (Egea, 2003)
- Les Amants (Egea, 2004)
- Play Morricone 2 (CAM Jazz, 2004)
- Ballads (CAM Jazz, 2006)
- Live in Japan (CAM Jazz, 2007)
- As Never Before (CAM Jazz, 2008)
- Yellow & Blue Suites (Challenge, 2008)
- Dream Dance (CAM Jazz, 2009)
- Live at the Village Vanguard (CAM Jazz, 2013)

With John Scofield

- Meant to Be (Blue Note, 1991)
- The John Scofield Quartet Plays Live (Jazz Door, 1993)
- Steady Groovin' (Blue Note, 2000)

With Toots Thielemans

- Ne Me Quitte Pas (Milan, 1987)
- Only Trust Your Heart (Concord Jazz, 1988)
- Do Not Leave Me (Stash, 1989)
- The Brasil Project (Private Music, 1992)
- The Brasil Project Vol. 2 (Private Music, 1993)

With others

- Rez Abbasi, Third Ear (Cathexis, 1995)
- Sezen Aksu, Deliveren (Post Muzik, 2000)
- Warren Bernhardt, Hands On (DMP, 1987)
- Randy Bernsen, Calling Me Back Home (101 South, 1993)
- Paul Bley, Paul Plays Carla (SteepleChase, 1992)
- Salvatore Bonafede, Salvatore Bonafede Trio Plays (Bellaphon/Ken Music 1991)
- Bob Brookmeyer, Through a Looking Glass (Finesse, 1981)
- Gary Burton, Times Like These (GRP, 1988)
- Vinicius Cantuaria, Vinicius (Transparent Music, 2001)
- Chamber Music Society of Lincoln Center, Serenade, K. 361 Gran Partita & A Musical Joke, K. 522 (Arabesque, 1991)
- Chris Cheek, A Girl Named Joe (Fresh Sound, 1998)
- John D'earth, One Bright Glance (Enja, 1990)
- Harold Danko, Alone but Not Forgotten (Sunnyside, 1989)
- Trudy Desmond, Make Me Rainbows (Koch, 1995)
- Bill Evans (saxophonist), Summertime (Jazz City 1989)
- Al Di Meola, Orange and Blue (Bluemoon, 1994)
- Kurt Elling, Flirting with Twilight (Blue Note, 2001)
- Dominick Farinacci, Lovers Tales & Dances (Koch, 2009)
- Mitchel Forman, Train of Thought (Magenta, 1985)
- Michael Franks, Abandoned Garden (Warner Bros., 1995)
- Don Friedman, Don Friedman (Swedisc, 1980)
- Carlos Franzetti, New York Toccata (Verve, 1985)
- Jamey Haddad, Names (Ananda, 1983)
- Fred Hersch, Horizons (Concord Jazz, 1985)
- Fred Hersch, Evanessence (Evidence, 1991)
- George Jinda, Between Dreams (Shanachie, 1996)
- Rodney Jones, Dreams and Stories (Savant, 2005)
- Dick Katz, In High Profile (Bee Hive, 1984)
- Lee Konitz, The New York Album (Soul Note, 1988)
- Lee Konitz, Sound of Surprise (BMG, 1999)
- T Lavitz, Mood Swing (Nova, 1991)
- Nguyen Le, Miracles (Musidisc, 1996)
- Nguyen Le, Three Trios (ACT, 1997)
- Mel Lewis, Make Me Smile & Other New Works by Bob Brookmeyer (Finesse, 1982)
- Mel Lewis, Mellifluous (Gatemouth, 1981)
- Charles Lloyd, Lift Every Voice (ECM, 2002)
- Chuck Loeb, Balance (DMP, 1991)
- Joe Lovano, Village Rhythm (Soul Note, 1989)
- Joe Lovano, Landmarks (Blue Note, 1991)
- Mike Mainieri, An American Diary (NYC, 1997)
- Adam Makowicz, The Name Is Makowic (Sheffield Lab, 1983)
- Rick Margitza, Color (Blue Note, 1989)
- Rick Margitza, Hope (Blue Note, 1991)
- Jill McManus, Symbols of Hopi (Concord Jazz, 1984)
- Jim McNeely, From the Heart (Owl, 1985)
- Jim McNeely, East Coast Blow Out (Lipstick, 1991)
- Vince Mendoza, Instructions Inside (Manhattan, 1991)
- Jon Metzger, Out of the Dark (V.S.O.P. 1986)
- Bob Mintzer, Hymn (Owl, 1991)
- Silvano Monasterios, Roads Not Taken (Forever Music 1997)
- Paul Motian, Bill Evans (JMT, 1990)
- Night Ark, In Wonderland (EmArcy, 1997)
- Makoto Ozone, Walk Alone (Victor 2000)
- Makoto Ozone, Now You Know (2007)
- Eugene Pao, This Window (SME, 1999)
- Jackie Paris, Jackie Paris (Audiophile, 1993)
- Kim Pensyl, Eyes of Wonder (GRP, 1993)
- Jim Pugh, The Pugh-Taylor Project (DMP, 1984)
- The Rembrandts, Untitled (ATCO, 1992)
- Ryuichi Sakamoto, Beauty (Virgin, 1989)
- Dino Saluzzi, Cite De La Musique (ECM, 1997)
- Don Sebesky, I Remember Bill (RCA Victor, 1998)
- Cathy Segal-Garcia, Song of the Heart (Sunshine, 2002)
- Martial Solal, Balade Du 10 Mars (Soul Note, 1999)
- Martial Solal, Triangle (JMS, 1995)
- Kenneth Sivertsen, Remembering North (NORCD, 1993)
- Steps Ahead, Holding Together (NYC, 2002)
- John Taylor, Rosslyn With Marc Johnson, Joey Baron (ECM, 2003)
- Ralph Towner, Lost and Found (ECM, 1996)
- Chinary Ung, Grand Spiral (Composers, 1996)
- Roseanna Vitro, The Time of My Life: Roseanna Vitro Sings the Songs of Steve Allen (Sea Breeze, 1999)
- Eric Vloeimans, Bitches and Fairy Tales (Challenge, 1998)
- Eric Vloeimans, North Sea Jazz Legendary Concerts (Bob City, 2013)
- Sadao Watanabe, A Night with Strings (Elektra 1993)
- Kenny Werner, Unprotected Music (Double-Time, 1998)
- Tom Wopat, Tom Wopat Sings Harold Arlen (Hyena, 2005)
- Akiko Yano, Granola (Midi, 1987)

== See also ==
- List of jazz bassists
