= Music from Man of La Mancha =

Man of La Mancha

Studio album by Eliane Elias
- Released: April 13, 2018
- Recorded: 1995
- Studio: Power Station, New York City
- Genre: Jazz
- Length: 53:25
- Label: Concord Jazz
- Producer: Mitch Leigh, Eliane Elias

Eliane Elias chronology
Dance of Time (2017)	Man of La Mancha (2018)	Love Stories (2019)

Professional ratings
Review scores
Source	Rating
AllMusic	4/5 stars
Jazz Forum	3/5 stars
Jazzwise	4/5 stars
Tom Hull	B+

Music from Man of La Mancha is a studio album by Brazilian jazz pianist and singer Eliane Elias. The album was recorded in 1995 but released by Concord only on April 13, 2018.

== Background ==
Music from Man of La Mancha is Elias' 26th full-length album. The tracks for the album were recorded as early as in 1995 and produced by Elias together with Mitch Leigh, the late composer of the music for the Broadway musical Man of La Mancha that premiered in 1964. The production was inspired by an earlier, 1959 non-musical stage production, I, Don Quixote, itself inspired by Miguel de Cervantes' 17th-century masterpiece Don Quixote. The album was not released for so long because of contractual limitations; Leigh passed in 2014 and never saw its release.

== Chart performance ==
The album debuted at No. 1 on the Billboard magazine Traditional Jazz Chart and No. 20 on Top Heatseekers one week after its release.

== Reception ==
Bobby Reed of DownBeat stated, "Melodies, melodies, sumptuous melodies. That's the central attraction of Eliane Elias' new album, which also features dazzling bouts of improvisation... Elias and her collaborators recorded this material in 1995, but due to contractual obstacles, it was never released. Now, with the blessing of the Leigh family, this gem finally is available. One need not have any familiarity with the stage or film versions of Man of La Mancha to enjoy this excellent album, which is filled with hummable melodies and Elias' impressive, right-hand improv flourishes. Deftly avoiding sentimentality and cliché, the pianist has crafted a compelling samba arrangement of "The Impossible Dream" (one of the show's most often-interpreted tunes). Elias utilized the Brazilian rhythm of frevo in her arrangement of "A Little Gossip," which is spiced with an agile solo by Johnson. "I'm Only Thinking of Him," which features Gomez and DeJohnette, feels completely fresh in 2018."

Christopher Loudon of JazzTimes commented "...it is an immensely lush album, a vibrant fusion of Elias' Brazilian verve and the music's Latin-meets-Broadway zest—from a shimmering "Dulcinea," gently roiling "It's All the Same" and stirringly contemplative "The Barber's Song," to a fiery, passionate "To Each His Dulcinea" and the Carnaval-esque rumpus of "A Little Gossip." And, yes, "Dream" is here: freed of the bombast pop vocalists have typically lent it, masterfully reimagined as a spirited samba".

== Track listing ==
All music is composed by Mitch Leigh.

No.	Title	Length
1.	"To Each His Dulcinea"	5:42
2.	"Dulcinea"	5:34
3.	"What Does He Want of Me"	6:43
4.	"The Barber's Song"	5:08
5.	"It's All the Same"	7:17
6.	"I'm Only Thinking of Him"	5:04
7.	"Man of La Mancha (I, Don Quixote)"	7:41
8.	"The Impossible Dream"	5:48
9.	"A Little Gossip"	4:31
Total length:		53:25

== Personnel ==
Band

- Eliane Elias – piano, arranger, liner notes, producer
- Eddie Gomez – bass
- Marc Johnson – bass
- Jack DeJohnette – drums
- Satoshi Takeishi – drums
- Manolo Badrena – percussion

Production

- Paul Blakemore – mastering
- Mitch Leigh – producer
- Hans Liebert – engineer
- Christine Martin – executive producer
- Steve Rodby – digital mastering
- Priscila Silvestre – photography
- Carrie Smith – layout
