= Dance of Time (album) =

Studio album by Eliane Elias
- Released: March 24, 2017
- Studio: Dissenso Studio & NaCena Studios, São Paulo, Brazil
- Genre: Jazz
- Length: 56:37
- Label: Concord Jazz
- Producer: Marc Johnson, Steve Rodby, Eliane Elias

Eliane Elias chronology
Made in Brazil (2015)	Dance of Time (2017)	Music from Man of La Mancha (2018)

Professional ratings
Review scores
Source	Rating
All About Jazz	5/5 stars
AllMusic	4/5 stars
The Guardian	4/5 stars
Evening Standard	4/5 stars
Jazzwise	4/5 stars
Record Collector	3/5 stars
The Times	4/5 stars
Tom Hull	B+

Dance of Time is a 2017 studio album by Brazilian jazz musician Eliane Elias. The album was recorded in Brazil and released on March 24, 2017 via Concord Records. This is her 25th album as a leader. Dance of Time received the Latin Grammy for Best Latin Jazz Album at the 18th Annual Latin Grammy Awards.

== Background ==
Guest musicians include pianist Amilton Godoy, Brazilian guitarists João Bosco and Toquinho, trumpeter Randy Brecker, vibraphonist Mike Mainieri, and singer Mark Kibble. The album celebrates the samba, a genre originating in Bahia via Africa as the last year marked the 100th anniversary of "Pelo Telefone", the first recorded samba track. Eliane's style of samba greatly borrows from choro, a tango influenced, slower type of samba that emerged in the 1930s. The album contains skillfully arranged classic tracks and contemporary samba compositions.

== Reception ==
Peter Jones of London Jazz News noted, "As smooth as a smoothie made of liquid silk, singer and pianist Eliane Elias has spent the last three decades flying the flag for the kind of Brazilian music that first became internationally popular in the late 1950s. But far from being a mere nostalgist, she keeps it alive and kicking with her bold, contemporary arrangements... On this new album she focuses on the samba, with a side order of bossa nova. But what makes it the best collection of hers that I've ever heard (and I must admit, I haven't heard all 23 albums) is the inclusion of some astoundingly good sidemen."

John Fordham of The Guardian wrote, "As a vocalist, the Brazilian Eliane Elias radiates as much starry smooth-jazzy hipness as Diana Krall, but as an improvising pianist she's in a different league: a wellspring of polished bebop lines and skittish flourishes... Elias's trumpeter ex-husband Randy Brecker and Steps Ahead vibraphone partner Mike Mainieri are in the lineup, and the songs embrace jazz standards, Brazilian classics and poignant originals such as the dreamy Little Paradise." Dance of Time received the Latin Grammy for Best Latin Jazz Album and was nominated for Best Engineered Album at the 18th Annual Latin Grammy Awards.

== Track listing ==
No.	Title	Writer(s)	Length
1.	"O Pato"	Jayme Silva, Neuza Teixeira	4:18
2.	"You're Getting to Be a Habit with Me"	Al Dubin, Harry Warren	3:52
3.	"Copacabana"	João de Barro, Albert Ribiero	5:22
4.	"Coisa Feita"	Aldir Blanc, João Bosco, Paulo Emilio	5:02
5.	"By Hand (Em Mãos)"	Eliane Elias	5:17
6.	"Sambou Sambou"	João Donato	3:52
7.	"Little Paradise"	Eliane Elias	5:00
8.	"Speak Low"	Ogden Nash, Kurt Weill	6:33
9.	"Samba de Orly"	Chico Buarque, Vinícius de Moraes, Toquinho	3:22
10.	"Na Batucada Da Vida"	Ary Barroso, Luiz Peixoto	5:39
11.	"An Up Dawn"	Eliane Elias	4:25
12.	"Not to Cry (Pra Não Chorar)"	Eliane Elias, Toquinho	3:55
Total length:			56:37

== Personnel ==
Band

- Eliane Elias – piano, vocals, producer
- Randy Brecker – flugelhorn
- Amilton Godoy – piano
- Mike Mainieri – vibraphone
- João Bosco – guitar, vocals
- Conrado Goys – electric guitar
- Marcus Teixeira – acoustic guitar
- Toquinho – guitar, vocals
- Marcelo Mariano – bass guitar
- Celso de Almeida – drums
- Edú Ribeiro – drums
- Gustavo Di Dalva – percussion
- Marivaldo Dos Santos – percussion
- Mark Kibble – background vocals

Production

- Paul Blakemore – mastering
- Rodrigo de Castro Lopes – engineer
- Chris Dunn – A&R
- Mary Hogan – A&R
- Marc Johnson – producer
- Pete Karam – mixing
- Bryan Pugh – vocal engineer
- Steve Rodby – producer
- Philppe Salomon – photography
- Carrie Smith – package design
- Bob Wolfenson – photography
