= Everything I Love (Eliane Elias album) =

Studio album by Eliane Elias
- Released: February 15, 2000
- Recorded: May–June 1999
- Studio: Avatar (New York, New York)
- Genre: Contemporary Jazz
- Length: 1:02:27
- Label: Blue Note 5208272; EMI 520-8272
- Producer: Eliane Elias, Marc Johnson

Eliane Elias chronology
Eliane Elias Sings Jobim (1998)	Everything I Love (2000)	Kissed By Nature (2002)

Professional ratings
Review scores
Source	Rating
AllMusic	3/5 stars
The Virgin Encyclopedia of Jazz	4/5 stars
The Penguin Guide to Jazz Recordings	3.5/4 stars

Everything I Love is the fourteenth studio album by Brazilian jazz artist Eliane Elias. The album was released on February 15, 2000, via Blue Note and EMI labels.

== Reception ==
Josef Woodard of Jazz Times wrote "The Brazilian-American pianist has been considering her roots on recent albums, drawing through lines from Brazil to jazz and back. The concept album basis takes a holiday, though, on her latest, Everything I Love. The title is not, in fact, a summation of the aesthetic program, as a sweeping statement of her musical affinities, but just the title song. The album is just an unpretentious and flowingly realized song set, on which the pianist spins off the familiar themes. ... Periodically, Elias slips into her relaxed phrasing as a vocalist ... but her voice, nice as it is, is an adjunct to the main message here: the continuing maturation of an expressive jazz pianist, stretching out, assuredly and artfully, in trio territory."

Jim Santella in his review for All About Jazz commented, "Her light singing voice and light piano touch go hand in hand. Always clear and vibrant, pianist Eliane Elias creates modern mainstream quality every time out. This one is a love letter that she's put together to honor those who have inspired her." A writer of CMJ New Music Report stated, "Everything I Love is a blend of the mainstream, the high-quality artistry that is straight-ahead jazz playing (and occasionally singing) and the spirited, romantic quality that is her hallmark."

== Track listing ==
No.	Title	Writer(s)	Length
1.	"Bowing to Bud"	Eliane Elias	5:14
2.	"Nostalgia in Times Square"	Charles Mingus	4:18
3.	"The Beat of My Heart"	Harold Spina, Johnny Burke	2:18
4.	"I Fall in Love Too Easily"	Jule Styne, Sammy Cahn	3:51
5.	"Everything I Love"	Cole Porter	5:21
6.	"Introduction #1/ If I Should Lose You"	Eliane Elias / Ralph Rainger, Leo Robin	7:24
7.	"They Say It's Wonderful"	Irving Berlin	3:07
8.	"I Love You"	Cole Porter	4:51
9.	"That's All It Was"	Eliane Elias	4:39
10.	"Introduction #2/ Alone Together"	Eliane Elias/ Arthur Schwartz, Howard Dietz	7:55
11.	"Woody 'n' You"	Dizzy Gillespie	4:05
12.	"Blah Blah Blah"	George Gershwin, Ira Gershwin	2:45
13.	"Introduction #3 / Autumn Leaves"	Eliane Elias / Joseph Kosma, Johnny Mercer, Jacques Prévert	6:39
Total length:			01:02:27

== Credits ==
- Eliane Elias – piano, vocals
- Rodney Jones – guitar
- Christian McBride – bass (1, 2, 11, 12)
- Marc Johnson – bass (3–10, 13)
- Carl Allen – drums (1, 2, 3, 11, 12)
- Jack DeJohnette – drums (4–10)
