= I Thought About You (Eliane Elias album) =

Studio album by Eliane Elias
- Released: May 28, 2013
- Studio: Avatar (New York, New York); Montauk Sound (Long Island, New York)
- Genre: Jazz
- Length: 54:42
- Label: Concord Records CJA-34191-02
- Producer: Marc Johnson, Steve Rodby, Eliane Elias

Eliane Elias chronology
Light My Fire (2011)	I Thought About You (2013)	Made in Brazil (2015)

Professional ratings
Review scores
Source	Rating
AllMusic	3/5 stars
All About Jazz	4/5 stars
The Buffalo News	3.5/4 stars
Jazzwise	4/5 stars
Tom Hull	B+

I Thought About You: A Tribute to Chet Baker is the twenty-second studio album by Brazilian jazz pianist and singer Eliane Elias. It was released on May 28, 2013, via Concord Picante label. The album is dedicated to American jazz trumpeter and vocalist Chet Baker. On this record she performs famous jazz standards and compositions.

== Reception ==
Christopher Loudon of Jazz Times stated "Its release timed to coincide with the 25th anniversary of Chet Baker’s death, Eliane Elias’ I Thought About You is the most satisfying of the many Baker tributes that have surfaced of late, because the Brazilian pianist and vocalist so keenly appreciates a key shared attribute. Like the perennially misunderstood Baker, wrongfully pegged as a tragedian, Elias is first and foremost a sensualist". Matt Collar of Allmusic wrote "Pianist and vocalist Eliane Elias pays tribute to legendary jazz trumpeter/vocalist Chet Baker on her 2013 album I Thought About You. Featuring a selection of standards strongly associated with Baker, Elias mixes her native Brazilian bossa nova with swing, straight-ahead jazz, and even a few bluesy flourishes with much aplomb. " Jeff Simon of The Buffalo News commented, "Her slow sinuous version of Neal Hefti’s “Girl Talk” is among the many jazz versions which will never begin to equal Ray Bryant's, but it's hard not to love it anyway."

== Track listing ==
No.	Title	Writer(s)	Length
1.	"I Thought About You"	Jimmy Van Heusen, Johnny Mercer	4:56
2.	"There Will Never Be Another You"	Harry Warren, Mack Gordon	4:42
3.	"This Can't Be Love"	Richard Rodgers, Lorenz Hart	3:53
4.	"Embraceable You"	George Gershwin, Ira Gershwin	5:04
5.	"That Old Feeling"	Sammy Fain, Lew Brown	3:52
6.	"Everything Depends on You"	Charles Carpenter, Earl Hines, Louis Dunlap	3:57
7.	"I've Never Been in Love Before"	Frank Loesser	3:54
8.	"Let's Get Lost"	Frank Loesser, Jimmy McHugh	4:18
9.	"You Don't Know What Love Is"	Gene de Paul, Don Raye	5:13
10.	"Blue Room"	Richard Rodgers, Lorenz Hart	2:11
11.	"Just Friends"	John Klenner, Sam M. Lewis	3:30
12.	"Girl Talk"	Neal Hefti, Bobby Troup	3:50
13.	"Just in Time"	Jule Styne, Betty Comden, Adolph Green	2:37
14.	"I Get Along Without You Very Well"	Hoagy Carmichael	3:05
Total length:			54:42

== Personnel ==
- Eliane Elias – piano, vocals
- Randy Brecker – trumpet, flugelhorn
- Steve Cardenas – electric guitar
- Oscar Castro-Neves – acoustic guitar
- Marc Johnson – double bass
- Rafael Barata – drums
- Victor Lewis – drums
- Marivaldo Dos Santos – percussion

== Chart positions ==
Chart (2013)	Peak position
French Albums (SNEP)	155
Belgian Albums (Ultratop Wallonia)	173
