= Paulistana (album) =

Studio album by Eliane Elias
- Released: October 5, 1993
- Genre: Latin jazz
- Length: 51:02
- Label: Blue Note CDP 0777 7 89544 2 2
- Producer: Eliane Elias

Eliane Elias chronology
Fantasia (1992)	Paulistana (1993)	On the Classical Side (1993)

Professional ratings
Review scores
Source	Rating
AllMusic	3/5 stars
The Buffalo News	3.5/4 stars
The Penguin Guide to Jazz on CD	3/4 stars
The Virgin Encyclopedia of Jazz	3/5 stars

Paulistana is the eighth studio album by Brazilian jazz pianist, composer, and singer Eliane Elias. The record was released on October 5, 1993, via Blue Note label. The side musicians for this album include her long-time collaborators: Eddie Gomez and Marc Johnson on bass, Jack Dejohnette and Peter Erskine on drums, and Nana Vasconcelos on percussion. The vocal parts were performed by herself, her daughter Amanda Elias-Brecker, and Ivan Lins.

== Reception ==
A reviewer of Bristol Jazz Crew stated "Her favoured piano trio is the format of choice here, with Elias keen to hint at Bill Evans, as well as showcasing her own sound, with many tracks benefitting from some soulful and rhythmic percussion. On the downside, a handful of tracks also unweildily gain some of Elias’ vocals. Not to say that her voice is bad though - in fact its limited range is heightened by the warm and sensuous tone she brings to the lyrics – but its occasional lead means that her own piano playing, her greatest asset, is at times greatly reduced. A warm and enjoyable listening experience, the recasting of these classics in a jazz format is a winning success, and Elias’ own pieces here, including the title track, are also much stronger than before, blending nicely with the well-chosen covers. And even despite the small flaws, ‘Paulistana’ is a great uplifting jazz record that sits nicely in Eliane Elias’ discography." The Buffalo News review by Mary Kunz noted, "When you're as talented and good-looking a musician as she is, you can do whatever you want. Elias comes from Brazil, and her sound is rhythmic and tropical."

== Track listing ==
No.	Title	Writer(s)	Length
1.	"Brazil"	Ary Barroso, Bob Russell	4:59
2.	"Jazz Influence" (Influencia Do Jazz)	Carlos Lyra	3:18
3.	"Paulistana"	Eliane Elias	4:37
4.	"Black Orpheus"	Luiz Bonfá, Antônio Maria	6:38
5.	"Iluminados"	Ivan Lins, Vítor Martins	3:11
6.	"Carioca Nights" (Noites Cariocas)	Jacob do Bandolim	5:08
7.	"So in Love"	Eliane Elias	5:05
8.	"Jet Samba" (Samba Do Avião)	Antônio Carlos Jobim	5:13
9.	"Wild Flower"	Eliane Elias	7:41
10.	"Old Companion"	Cláudio Nucci	2:43
11.	"Who Knows" (Quem Diz Que Sabe)	João Donato	2:29
Total length:			51:02

== Personnel ==
Band

- Eliane Elias – piano, synthesizer (1, 3), vocals (5, 8, 10)
- Jim Beard – synthesizer (5)
- Marc Johnson – acoustic bass (1, 3, 6, 8, 9)
- Eddie Gómez – acoustic bass (4, 5, 7)
- Peter Erskine – drums (1, 6, 8, 9)
- Portinho – drums (3)
- Jack DeJohnette – drums (4, 5, 7)
- Café – percussion (1, 3, 6)
- Naná Vasconcelos – percussion (9)
- Ivan Lins – vocals (5)
- Amanda Elias Brecker – vocals (8)

Production

- Producer and Arrangements – Eliane Elias
- Associate Producer on Tracks 4, 6, 7 & 9 – Steve Khan
- Executive Producers – Christine Martin and Hitoshi Namekata
- Mixing – Malcolm Pollack (Tracks 1, 3, 5, 8 & 10); Paul Wickliffe (Tracks 2 & 11); James Farber (Tracks 4, 6, 7 & 9).
