= A Long Story (Eliane Elias album) =

Studio album by Eliane Elias
- Released: 1991
- Recorded: 1991
- Genre: Latin jazz
- Length: 49:22
- Label: Manhattan Records CDP 7 95476 2
- Producer: Jim Beard, Eliane Elias

Eliane Elias chronology
Eliane Elias Plays Jobim (1990)	A Long Story (1991)	Fantasia (1992)

Professional ratings
Review scores
Source	Rating
AllMusic	2/5 stars

A Long Story Eliane Elias is the sixth studio album by Brazilian jazz artist Eliane Elias. The record was released in 1991 via Manhattan Records label.

== Reception ==
Scott Yanow of Allmusic gave this album a negative review, stating "Eliane Elias is a very talented acoustic pianist whose style at times hints at Herbie Hancock and Chick Corea, but sounds quite individual. Unfortunately, this set is extremely lightweight. Most numbers have Elias doubling on synthesizers, with over half of the selections also including her wordless vocals; her voice is average at best. The tunes are moderately pop-ish without being memorable and Elias' piano playing is secondary to the weak melodies (all but "Let Me Go" are her originals) and so-so grooves. Eliane Elias is capable of so much better. Fortunately, there are many better Elias recordings available than this misfire."

== Track listing ==
All tracks are written by Eliane Elias, except track 10 written by Eliane Elias and Chico Novarro.

No.	Title	Length
1.	"Back in Time"	5:09
2.	"A Long Story"	5:04
3.	"Horizonte"	5:04
4.	"Just Kidding"	3:47
5.	"Life Goes On"	5:41
6.	"The Nile"	6:26
7.	"Get It"	4:19
8.	"Just for You"	4:55
9.	"Karamuru"	6:36
10.	"Let Me Go"	2:21
Total length:		49:22

== Personnel ==
- Eliane Elias – piano, synthesizer, vocals (tracks 1–7, 10), arrangements
- Anthony Jackson – bass (tracks: 5)
- Jeff Andrews – bass (tracks: 6 9)
- Lincoln Goines – bass (tracks: 2 4 7)
- Marc Johnson – bass (tracks: 1 3 8)
- Dave Weckl – drums (tracks: 4 7)
- Peter Erskine – drums (tracks: 1 to 3, 5, 6, 8, 9)
- Jon Herington – guitar (tracks: 1 2 3 5 6 8)
- Mino Cinelu – percussion (tracks: 1 2 3 5 6 8 9)
- Othello Molineaux – steel drums (tracks: 9)
- Bob Berg – tenor saxophone (tracks: 6 7 9)
- Mark Ledford – vocals (tracks: 1 4 6 7)
