= Fantasia (Eliane Elias album) =

Studio album by Eliane Elias
- Released: 1992
- Recorded: March 1992
- Studio: Sound on Sound Recording, New York City
- Genre: Bossa nova, smooth jazz
- Length: 47:30
- Label: Blue Note CDP 0777 7 96146 2 2
- Producer: Eliane Elias

Eliane Elias chronology
A Long Story (1991)	Fantasia (1992)	Paulistana (1993)

Professional ratings
Review scores
Source	Rating
AllMusic	4.5/5 stars
The Penguin Guide to Jazz on CD	3/4 stars
The Virgin Encyclopedia of Jazz	3/5 stars

Fantasia is the seventh studio album by Brazilian jazz artist Eliane Elias. The record was released in March, 1992 via Blue Note label. The vocal parts were performed by herself, her daughter Amanda Elias Brecker, and Ivan Lins. This record is one of her most acclaimed albums; Allmusic gave it 4½ stars out of five.

== Reception ==
Ron Wynn of Allmusic wrote "Eliane Elias continues exploring Brazilian music on this latest release, doing both classics such as "The Girl From Ipanema" and a Milton Nasciemento medley, plus several Ivan Lins tunes. She uses alternating bassists and drummers, with Eddie Gomez, Marc Johnson, Jack DeJohnette, and Peter Erskine dividing time, plus Nana Vasconcelos on percussion, with Lins helping out on vocals."

== Track listing ==
No.	Title	Writer(s)	Length
1.	"The Girl from Ipanema (Garôta de Ipanema)"	Antônio Carlos Jobim, Vinícius de Moraes, Norman Gimbel	6:30
2.	"Wave"	Antônio Carlos Jobim	3:44
3.	"Milton Nascimento Medley: Ponta de Areia / Canção do Sal / Cravo e Canela"	Milton Nascimento, Fernando Brant (1) / Ronaldo Bastos (3)	7:49
4.	"Sabe Você"	Carlos Lyra, Vinícius de Moraes	5:28
5.	"Bahia (Na Baixa do Sapateiro)"	Ary Barroso	5:48
6.	"Fantasia (To Amanda)"	Eliane Elias	2:28
7.	"No More Blues (Chega de Saudade)"	Antônio Carlos Jobim, Vinícius de Moraes, Jon Hendricks, Jesse Cavanaugh	8:38
8.	"Ivan Lins Medley: Coragem Mulher / Choro das Aguas / Presença / Coragem Mul"	Ivan Lins, Vítor Martins	7:05
Total length:			47:30

== Personnel ==
Band

- Piano, vocals, arrangements Producer – Eliane Elias
- Bass – Eddie Gómez (tracks: 2, 4, 6, 7, 8), Marc Johnson (3, 5)
- Drums – Jack DeJohnette (2, 4, 7, 8), Peter Erskine (3, 5)
- Percussion – Naná Vasconcelos (1, 3, 5, 8)
- Vocals – Amanda Elias Brecker (3), Ivan Lins (8)

Production

- Producer – Eliane Elias
- Recording engineer – James Farber
- Mastering – Yoshio Okazaki
- Art direction – Kaoru Taku
