= On the Classical Side =

Studio album by Eliane Elias
- Released: October 5, 1993
- Recorded: December 1992 and January–February 1993
- Studio: BMG Studios, New York City
- Genre: Classic music
- Length: 64:48
- Label: EMI
- Producer: Eliane Elias

Eliane Elias chronology
Paulistana (1993)	On the Classical Side (1993)	Solos and Duets (1995)

Professional ratings
Review scores
Source	Rating
AllMusic	4/5 stars

On the Classical Side is the ninth studio album by Brazilian jazz pianist and composer Eliane Elias. The record was released on October 5, 1993 via EMI Classics label. She plays 20 classical compositions of Heitor Villa-Lobos, Maurice Ravel, Johann Sebastian Bach, Frédéric Chopin.

== Reception ==
Ken Dryden of Allmusic stated:

Eliane Elias is best known for her work as a jazz pianist, though in her native Brazil, classical studies came first before her discovery of jazz. When she moved to the U.S. in 1981 to join the jazz fusion group Steps Ahead, she continued her classical studies for a time at Juilliard. Therefore, this all-classical solo piano CD, recorded in late 1992 and early 1993, should not come as a surprise. Like all virtuoso classical pianists, Elias doesn't play the compositions as if they are museum pieces not open to interpretation. Purists will marvel at the delicacy of her touch when playing Maurice Ravel's "Sonatine." Because Johann Sebastian Bach was a renowned improviser, Elias is naturally drawn to his works, in this case, a formidable performance of his "French Suite No. 5 in G Major." Elias dives headlong into the rich music of Chopin, especially "Mazurka Op. 56, No. 2 in C Major." But she is at her very best bringing life to the music of fellow countryman Heitor Villa-Lobos, playing individual selections from several longer pieces.
