= Chega de Saudade =

Brazilian bossa nova jazz standard by Antônio Carlos Jobim

Song by Elizeth Cardoso

from the album Canção do Amor Demais
- Language: Portuguese
- English title: "No More Blues"
- Released: 1958
- Recorded: 1957
- Genre: Bossa nova
- Composer: Antônio Carlos Jobim
- Lyricist: Vinícius de Moraes

"Chega de Saudade" (Brazilian Portuguese: [ˈʃeɡɐ dʒi sawˈdadʒi]), also known as "No More Blues", is a bossa nova song. It is often considered the first bossa nova song to have been recorded. "Chega de Saudade" and "The Girl from Ipanema" were both composed by Antônio Carlos Jobim with lyrics by Vinícius de Moraes.

== Overview ==
The song was first recorded in 1957 by Brazilian singer Elizeth Cardoso and released on her 1958 album Canção do Amor Demais. However, her release of the song received little attention. João Gilberto made the second recorded version of the song, also in 1958. Released as a single, Gilberto's version became a hit and consolidated bossa nova as a permanent genre in the Latin music lexicon. In addition to its release as a single, the song also appeared on Gilberto's first album, Chega de Saudade.

The title can be translated roughly as "enough longing", though the Portuguese word saudade carries a more complex meaning than "longing". The word implies an intensity of heartfelt connection that is yearned for passionately, not unlike feeling withdrawal symptoms from a drug that makes one feel good. Another good analogy for saudade might be an intense homesickness. Chega de, in this case, means "enough of, no more of", and has an implication similar to the colloquial expressions "enough with ..." or "enough already".

The song's form is 68 measures long; 32 measures in a minor key are followed by 36 measures in the parallel major key. (Cardoso's recording, for example, begins in D minor and moves to D major.)

It has been recorded by jazz and rock performers, with the English language title "No More Blues". English lyrics were written by Jon Hendricks and "Jessie Cavanaugh" (actually a pseudonym for music publisher Howard S. Richmond).

== Recognition ==
In 2000, the João Gilberto version was inducted to the Grammy Hall of Fame. A year later, Gilberto's album Chega De Saudade was inducted to the first Latin Grammy Hall of Fame.

The song was voted by the Brazilian edition of Rolling Stone as the 6th greatest Brazilian song.

== Covers and versions ==
Rosa Passos, Stan Getz, Dizzy Gillespie, Toninho Horta, Joe Henderson, The Hi-Lo's, Carmen McRae, and César Camargo Mariano are artists who have covered the song.. Others who have recorded the song are:

- Quincy Jones recorded a version for his "Big Band Bossa Nova" album in 1962.
- The song was recorded by cellist Yo-Yo Ma for his album Obrigado Brazil.
- American jazz vibraphonist Gary Burton also recorded the composition for his 1966 album The Time Machine, and his solo album Alone at Last (Atlantic, 1971).
- In 1984, under the English-language title "No More Blues", it was the opening track on singer Roseanna Vitro's debut LP, Listen Here.
- The song was performed by Brazilian metal band Angra at a live acoustic set at the auditorium of the Paris FNAC Forum in 1995. The recording was later featured on their EP "Live Acoustic at FNAC" in 1998.
- The Game Boy Color version of Grand Theft Auto 2 has a chiptune arrangement of the song as its character selection music, composed by Anthony Paton.
- Also recorded by Caroll Vanwelden on Portraits of Brazil (2016).
- Katie Noonan & Karin Schaupp covered the song on their album Songs of the Latin Skies (2017).
- Zule Guerra recorded it for her EP Tres de tres: Brazilian.
- A version of the song was recorded by Geoff Knorr for the soundtrack of Civilization V as the musical theme for the Brazilian civilization.
- Persona 5 Royal's No More What Ifs, composed by Shoji Meguro in 2020, resembles Chega de Saudade.
- Eliane Elias included the song in her albums Fantasia (1992), The Three Americas (1996), and Brazilian Classics (2003).
- Emmet Cohen and his trio performed an arrangement of the song featuring Spanish singer Mar Vilaseca and guitarist Yotam Silberstein.
- In 2016, American rapper Azealia Banks released a cover version of the song on her SoundCloud page.
