= Shades of Jade =

Studio album by Marc Johnson
- Released: September 17, 2005
- Recorded: January–February 2004
- Studios: Avatar, New York City
- Genre: Jazz
- Length: 60:44
- Labels: ECM; ECM 1894
- Producers: Manfred Eicher, Eliane Elias

Marc Johnson chronology
| Bass and Cello (2004) | Shades of Jade (2005) | Swept Away (2012) |

Shades of Jade is a studio album by American jazz bassist Marc Johnson, recorded in early 2004 and released on ECM September the following year—his first release for the label since 1987. The album's title is a reference to, Scott La Faro's "Jade Visions," first featured on Sunday at the Village Vanguard; both La Faro and Johnson came to prominence as the bassist in Bill Evans' Trio.

Professional ratings
Review scores
| Source | Rating |
|---|---|
| All About Jazz | 4.5/5 stars |
| The Buffalo News | 4/4 stars |
| Guardian | 4/5 stars |
| PopMatters | 6/10 stars |
| Tom Hull | B+ |
| The Penguin Guide to Jazz Recordings | 3.5/4 stars |

== Reviews ==
All About Jazz's critic John Kelman stated, "Some would argue that it's impossible to call a recording classic until sufficient time has passed to determine its true staying power. Still, one can say that a recording has the makings of a classic—especially in its ability to be simultaneously of its time and timeless."

Mike Shanly in his review for JazzTimes wrote, "In fact, Elias could almost be the de facto leader of the session."

Jeff Simon of The Buffalo News noted "When you hear the gorgeous, summer-afternoon trance tune that gives the disc its title, you'll know how very much about beauty Johnson learned as the bassist for both Bill Evans and Stan Getz, once upon a time... A gorgeous disc."

BBC music critic Peter Marsh wrote: "But it's the ballads (and especially Elias's poised, emotionally charged soloing) that stay in the memory long after the CD's finished. While this music might not change your world, it'll feel like a better place while you're listening to it. That can't be bad."

The Guardian reviewer awarded the album four stars.

== Track listing ==
All pieces by Marc Johnson (1, 3, 5, 7-8) and Eliane Elias (1-4, 6, 9).

1. "Ton sur ton" (5:55)
2. "Apareceu" (6:04)
3. "Shades of Jade" (7:40)
4. "In 30 Hours" (6:10)
5. "Blue Nefertiti" (7:14)
6. "Snow" (8:24)
7. "Since You Asked" (3:18)
8. "Raise" (6:35)
9. "All Yours" (4:11)
10. "Don't Ask of Me" (5:13)

== Personnel ==
- Marc Johnson – double bass
- Joe Lovano – tenor saxophone (except tracks 6, 7 & 10)
- John Scofield – guitar (tracks 1, 3, 5, 8)
- Eliane Elias – piano (except tracks 7 & 10)
- Joey Baron – drums
- Alain Mallet – organ (tracks 8 & 10)
