= Swept Away (Marc Johnson album) =

Studio album by Marc Johnson and Eliane Elias
- Released: September 7, 2012
- Recorded: February 2010
- Studio: Avatar (New York, New York)
- Genre: Jazz
- Length: 1:08:26
- Label: ECM; ECM 2168
- Producer: Eliane Elias, Marc Johnson

Marc Johnson and Eliane Elias chronology
Shades of Jade (2005)	Swept Away (2012)

Professional ratings
Review scores
Source	Rating
Allmusic	4/5 stars
All About Jazz	5/5 stars
The Buffalo News	3/4 stars
Financial Times	4/5 stars
The Guardian	4/5 stars
The Irish Times	5/5 stars
Jazz Forum	5/5 stars
Jazzwise	4/5 stars
Tom Hull	B+

Swept Away is a studio album by a quartet led by double bassist Marc Johnson and pianist Eliane Elias, with tenor saxophonist Joe Lovano and drummer Joey Baron, recorded in February 2010 and released on ECM in September 2012.

== Reception ==
Both The Guardian and AllMusic gave the album four stars. In The Guardian, critic John Fordham sees the influence of Bill Evans and Keith Jarrett and praises the album's intimacy. At AllMusic, Rick Anderson calls it "ECM jazz" for the melancholy and spaciousness which are characteristic of many albums in the label's catalogue.

Cormac Larkin of The Irish Times gave the album five stars, stating it was even better than Johnson and Elias's last collaboration, and crediting Elias in particular for "really lift[ing] Swept Away to another level." Phil Johnson of The Independent commented "Bassist Johnson and pianist Elias are partners in life as well as music, and this delightfully dreamy album of 11 songs suggests the domestic scale and unforced intimacy of an interior by the French painter Pierre Bonnard... As sensitive, small-group jazz goes, this is close to definitive." Jeff Tamarkin writing for JazzTimes added, "Although Johnson shares top billing with Elias, his role is largely confined to locking in with Baron and too infrequently unfurling a faultlessly framed solo..."

== Track listing ==
All tracks except for "Shenandoah" were composed by Eliane Elias (1–3, 5, 7, 8, 10) and Marc Johnson (4, 6, 8–10).

1. "Swept Away" – 6:18
2. "It's Time" – 5:49
3. "One Thousand and One Nights" – 8:18
4. "When the Sun Comes Up" – 6:36
5. "B Is for Butterfly" – 8:05
6. "Midnight Blue" – 6:00
7. "Moments" – 5:50
8. "Sirens of Titan" – 5:55
9. "Foujita" – 6:36
10. "Inside Her Old Music Box" – 5:27
11. "Shenandoah" (Traditional) – 4:35

== Personnel ==
- Eliane Elias – piano
- Marc Johnson – double bass
- Joe Lovano – tenor saxophone
- Joey Baron – drums

== Chart positions ==
Chart (2008)	Peak position
Swedish Albums (Sverigetopplistan)	51
Belgian Albums (Ultratop Flanders)	148
