= Eliane Elias Sings Jobim =

Studio album by Eliane Elias
- Released: July 28, 1998
- Genre: Contemporary jazz
- Length: 50:59
- Label: Blue Note CDP 7243 4 95050 2 5
- Producer: Eliane Elias, Oscar Castro-Neves

Eliane Elias chronology
Impulsive! (1997)	Eliane Elias Sings Jobim (1998)	Everything I Love (2000)

Professional ratings
Review scores
Source	Rating
AllMusic	3/5 stars
All About Jazz	4/4 stars
The Penguin Guide to Jazz Recordings	3.5/4 stars
The Virgin Encyclopedia of Jazz	3/5 stars
Tom Hull	A−

Eliane Elias Sings Jobim is the thirteenth studio album by Brazilian jazz artist Eliane Elias. It was released on July 28, 1998 via Blue Note label. This is her second album solely dedicated to the works of Antônio Carlos Jobim after Eliane Elias Plays Jobim released in 1990.

== Reception ==
David Zych of Jazz Times stated "On the heels of her successful Eliane Elias Plays Jobim comes this new outing, and it is a winner. Elias’s touch on the keyboard is gentle and deliberate, making every note count and never letting one go to waste. But that delightful touch that she projects with such seeming ease also shines in the swing department. Her reading of “So Danso Samba,” for example, is a great example of how she can deftly turn up the wick and have a ball. And her voice is every bit up to the challenge of Tom Jobim’s glorious music. Soft and velvety, her Portuguese is a treat to listen to as she delves into this music she obviously loves, treating it with empathy and feeling, and backed by a great band. Joining her are Marc Johnson on bass, Michael Brecker, naturally, on tenor, and Brazilian colleagues Paulo Braga, one of Jobim’s longest serving durmmers, and guitarist Oscar Castro-Neves. Elias does herself proud as a singer, and her playing is straight from the heart."

A reviewer of Dusty Groove stated "Eliane Elias really shows off her vocal skills here – singing the music of Antonio Carlos Jobim at a level that really recalls some of the best breathy singers of the 60s – a mode that was especially rare at the time this set was recorded! Eliane definitely references Astrud Gilberto a lot in her approach, but also finds here own level too – a sound that's also shaped by her own work on the record on piano, in a group that also features Oscar Castro Neves on guitar and Michael Brecker on tenor sax".

== Track listing ==
No.	Title	Writer(s)	Length
1.	"Garota De Ipanema"	Antônio Carlos Jobim, Vinícius de Moraes, Norman Gimbel	3:53
2.	"Samba De Uma Nota So"	Antônio Carlos Jobim, Newton Mendonça, Jon Hendricks	3:02
3.	"Só Danço Samba"	Antônio Carlos Jobim, Vinícius de Moraes	2:07
4.	"Ela é Carioca"	Antônio Carlos Jobim, Vinícius de Moraes, Ray Gilbert	3:00
5.	"Anos Dourados"	Antônio Carlos Jobim, Chico Buarque	2:46
6.	"Desafinado"	Antônio Carlos Jobim, Newton Mendonça	3:23
7.	"Falando De Amor"	Antônio Carlos Jobim	3:06
8.	"Samba do Avião"	Antônio Carlos Jobim	3:00
9.	"A Felicidade"	Antônio Carlos Jobim, Vinícius de Moraes	4:02
10.	"Por Toda A Minha Vida"	Antônio Carlos Jobim, Vinícius de Moraes	2:51
11.	"How Insensitive"	Antônio Carlos Jobim, Norman Gimbel	2:56
12.	"Esquecendo Voce"	Antônio Carlos Jobim	4:16
13.	"Pois é"	Antônio Carlos Jobim, Chico Buarque	1:35
14.	"Amor Em Paz"	Antônio Carlos Jobim, Vinícius de Moraes, Ray Gilbert	4:42
15.	"Modinha"	Antônio Carlos Jobim, Vinícius de Moraes	2:25
16.	"Caminhos Cruzados"	Antônio Carlos Jobim, Vinícius de Moraes	4:02
Total length:			50:59

== Personnel ==
- Eliane Elias – voice and piano
- Michael Brecker – tenor sax
- Amanda Elias Brecker – background vocal
- Oscar Castro-Neves – guitar
- Marc Johnson – bass
- Paulo Braga – drums
- Café – percussion
