= The Three Americas =

Studio album by Eliane Elias
- Released: 1996
- Recorded: 1996
- Genre: Contemporary jazz
- Length: 52:21
- Label: Blue Note CDP-553328
- Producer: Eliane Elias, Christine Martin

Eliane Elias chronology
Solos and Duets (1994)	The Three Americas (1996)	Impulsive! (1997)

Professional ratings
Review scores
Source	Rating
AllMusic	3/5 stars
Entertainment Weekly	B+
The Penguin Guide to Jazz Recordings	3/4 stars
The Penguin Guide to Jazz on CD	3.5/4 stars

The Three Americas is the eleventh studio album by Brazilian jazz artist Eliane Elias. The record was released in 1996 via Blue Note label. The name of the album is explained by Elias in the notes:"My intention for this recording is not only to present some of the innumerable sounds and rhythms of North, Central and South America but also to capture the musical essence of each America and combine their various rhythms and sounds to beat as one heart."

== Reception ==
Josef Woodard of Entertainment Weekly wrote "Brazilian-born jazz pianist Eliane Elias has lived in the States for nearly half her 37 years, and her impressive new album, The Three Americas, is a kind of homecoming, nodding to the Americas North, South, and Central. The concept flies. Elias ventures from the Brazilian turf of her infectious opener, ”An Up Dawn,” to a quasi-tango, ”Chorango,” to the urbane, New York-ish swagger of ”Jumping Fox,” all with her commanding touch."

Scott Yanow of Allmusic stated "Two sides of Eliane Elias are on display on this CD. She is heard as an effective soft-toned singer of bossa nova and (particularly on the last few numbers) as a strong post-bop jazz pianist. The bossas (which often feature guitarist Oscar Castro-Neves and flutist Dave Valentin) are enjoyable, if a bit lightweight, and "Chorango" (which has Gil Goldstein on accordion and violinist Mark Feldman) is a modern tango. But it is as a pianist that Elias is most significant, and fortunately, there are enough instrumentals on this release to make it worth picking up by jazz listeners."

== Track listing ==
All tracks are written by Eliane Elias except where noted.

No.	Title	Writer(s)	Length
1.	"An Up Dawn"		3:34
2.	"The Time Is Now"		4:36
3.	"Caipora"		4:44
4.	"Chorango"		7:05
5.	"Chega de Saudade"	Antônio Carlos Jobim, Vinícius de Moraes	3:49
6.	"Crystal and Lace"		4:12
7.	"Brigas, Nunca Mais"	Antônio Carlos Jobim, Vinícius de Moraes	2:29
8.	"Introduction to Guarani"		2:48
9.	"O Guarani"		5:56
10.	"Jungle Journey"		6:45
11.	"Missing You"		1:30
12.	"Jumping Fox"		4:53
Total length:			52:21

== Credits ==
- Accordion (guest artist) – Gil Goldstein
- Arranged By, Producer – Eliane Elias
- Bass (Acoustic) – Marc Johnson (tracks: 1, 2, 3, 4, 6, 9, 10, 12)
- Drums – Satoshi Takeishi (tracks: 1, 2, 3, 4, 6, 9, 10, 12)
- Executive Producer – Christine Martin
- Flutes – Dave Valentin (tracks: 1, 2, 3, 6)
- Guitar (Acoustic) – Oscar Castro-Neves (tracks: 1, 5, 7)
- Percussion – Café (tracks: 1, 3, 6, 7), Manolo Badrena (tracks: 2, 9, 10)
- Piano – Eliane Elias (tracks: 1, 2, 3, 4, 5, 6, 8, 9, 10, 11, 12)
- Vocals – Eliane Elias (tracks: 1, 3, 5, 7, 10)
