= Solos and Duets (Eliane Elias album) =

Studio album by Eliane Elias
- Released: 1994
- Studio: Solo piano parts recorded at Elias Studio, Sao Paulo, in December 1994. Duets recorded at Hit Factory, New York, on November 18, 1994
- Genre: Jazz
- Length: 54:05
- Label: Blue Note
- Producer: Eliane Elias, Christine Martin

Eliane Elias chronology
On the Classical Side (1993)	Solos and Duets (1994)	The Three Americas (1996)

Professional ratings
Review scores
Source	Rating
AllMusic	4.5/5 stars
The Penguin Guide to Jazz on CD	3.5/4 stars

Solos and Duets is the tenth studio album by Brazilian jazz artist Eliane Elias. The record was released in 1994 by Blue Note Records.

== Background ==
This record is one of her most acclaimed albums; Allmusic gave it 4.5 stars out of five. The album consists of 11 solo and duet compositions performed by herself and Herbie Hancock in a manner of friendly piano duel. On duet compositions, Eliane Elias' part appears on the left channel, and that of Herbie Hancock on the right one. There was no overdubbing used to record the album.

== Reception ==
Scott Yanow of Allmusic wrote "This release is a change of pace for Eliane Elias. Instead of interpreting Brazilian songs, fusion, or modern bop, Elias shows off her classical technique on a set of acoustic solos plus six duets with Herbie Hancock. She really digs into the standards (sometimes sounding a little like Keith Jarrett) and creates some fairly free and unexpected ideas while putting the accent on lyricism. Some of the music is introspective, and there are wandering sections, but the net results are logical and enjoyable. As for the duets, Elias and Hancock mostly stay out of each other's way, which is an accomplishment when one considers that the four-part "Messages" is a series of free improvisations. There are playful spots (particularly on the adventurous ten-minute rendition of "The Way You Look Tonight") and, since Elias knows Hancock's style well (and was clearly thrilled to have him on the date), their collaborations work quite well. A successful outing."

== Track listing ==
No.	Title	Writer(s)	Length
1.	"Autumn Leaves"	Joseph Kosma, Johnny Mercer, Jacques Prévert	4:50
2.	"The Masquerade Is Over"	Herbert Magidson, Allie Wrubel	5:12
3.	"The Way You Look Tonight"	Dorothy Fields, Jerome Kern	10:05
4.	"All the Things You Are"	Oscar Hammerstein II, Jerome Kern	3:22
5.	"Joy Spring/Have You Met Miss Jones"	Clifford Brown, Eliane Elias, Lorenz Hart, Richard Rodgers	4:54
6.	"Just Enough"	Herbie Hancock	5:44
7.	"Asa Branca"	Luiz Gonzaga	6:06
8.	"Messages"	Eliane Elias, Herbie Hancock	3:37
9.	"Messages, Pt. 2"	Eliane Elias, Herbie Hancock	2:36
10.	"Messages, Pt. 3"	Eliane Elias, Herbie Hancock	5:59
11.	"Messages, Pt. 4"	Eliane Elias, Herbie Hancock	1:40
Total length:			54:05

== Awards ==
In 1995, the album was nominated for the Grammy Award in the "Best Jazz Solo Performance" category.

== Personnel ==
- Executive Producer – Christine Martin
- Piano – Eliane Elias, Herbie Hancock (tracks: 3 6 8 9 10 11)
- Producer – Eliane Elias
- Recorded By – Stelio Carlini
- Technician [Piano] – Dirk Dickten (tracks: 3 6 8 9 10 11), Giovanni Aronne (tracks: 1 2 4 5 7)
