= Light My Fire (Eliane Elias album) =

Studio album by Eliane Elias
- Released: May 31, 2011
- Recorded: Avatar (New York, New York)
- Genre: Jazz
- Length: 54:29
- Label: Concord Picante
- Producer: Eliane Elias, Marc Johnson

Eliane Elias chronology
Eliane Elias Plays Live (2009)	Light My Fire (2011)	I Thought About You (2013)

Professional ratings
Review scores
Source	Rating
AllMusic	3/5 stars
All About Jazz	3.5/5 stars
The Guardian	4/5 stars
Jazzwise	4/5 stars
Tom Hull	B+

Light My Fire is the twenty-first studio album by Brazilian jazz pianist and singer Eliane Elias. It was released on May 31, 2011 by Concord Picante. On this record she performs mostly Brazilian songs, but also adds a couple of jazz standards and one or two famous rock and pop compositions. The Elias's song "What About the Heart (Bate Bate)" received a Grammy nomination for "Best Brazilian Song" in September 2011.

== Reception ==
Matt Collar of Allmusic wrote, "Brazilian jazz pianist, vocalist Eliane Elias' 2011 Concord Picante debut Light My Fire is a romantic and sultry affair that showcases her knack for traditional bossa nova tunes as well as few inspired covers. Joining Elias here are a few special guests including Brazil legend Gilberto Gil, who sings on three tracks, as well as singer Amanda Brecker (Elias' daughter with trumpeter Randy Brecker) who appears on "Toda Menina Baiana." Also backing Elias are a bevy of talented individuals, including producer/bassist Marc Johnson, guitarist Oscar Castro-Neves, percussionists Rafael Barata and Paulo Braga, and trumpeter Brecker."

Charles J. Gans of The Press of Atlantic City stated, "Light My Fire" showcases her talents as a four-tool player—singer, pianist, arranger and songwriter—with a romantic collection of classic Brazilian songs, American pop and jazz standards set to Brazilian grooves, and original tunes... Elias' personal Brazilian jazz blend shines through on her own compositions with lyrics in both Portuguese and English".

== Track listing ==
No.	Title	Writer(s)	Length
1.	"Rosa Morena"	Dorival Caymmi	4:18
2.	"Stay Cool"	Kenny Dorham, Eliane Elias	4:03
3.	"Aquele Abraço"	Gilberto Gil	5:18
4.	"Light My Fire"	John Densmore, Robby Krieger, Ray Manzarek, Jim Morrison	5:38
5.	"Isto Aqui O Que É" (Silver Sandal)	Ary Barroso	4:00
6.	"My Chérie Amour"	Henry Cosby, Sylvia Moy, Stevie Wonder	4:31
7.	"Toda Menina Baiana"	Gilberto Gil	4:23
8.	"Bananeira"	João Donato, Gilberto Gil	3:28
9.	"Made in Moonlight"	Eliane Elias, Gonzaguinha	5:12
10.	"Turn to Me (Samba Maracatú)"	Eliane Elias	3:39
11.	"Take Five"	Paul Desmond	5:13
12.	"What About the Heart (Bate Bate)"	Eliane Elias	4:46
Total length:			54:29

== Personnel ==
- Eliane Elias – piano, vocals
- Randy Brecker – trumpet, flugelhorn
- Lawrence Feldman – flute
- Oscar Castro-Neves – acoustic guitar
- Romero Lubambo – acoustic guitar
- Ross Traut – electric guitar
- Marc Johnson – bass guitar
- Rafael Barata – drums, percussion
- Paulo Braga – drums
- Pedrito Martinez – congas
- Marivaldo Dos Santos – percussion
- Paulo Braga – percussion
- Amanda Brecker – vocals
- Gilberto Gil – vocals

== Chart positions ==
Chart (2011)	Peak position
French Albums (SNEP)	65
