= Dalto (composer) =

- Born: Dalto Roberto Medeiros; 22 June 1949 (age 77)
- Origin: Niterói, RJ, Brazil
- Genres: Pop music, MPB
- Occupations: Singer and composer
- Instruments: Singing, classic guitar

Dalto Roberto Medeiros, stage name Dalto (born in Niterói, Rio de Janeiro (state), 22 June 1949) is a Brazilian composer and singer.

== Biography ==
In the beginning of the 1970s, Dalto has actuated as vocalist of the Niterói's rock band Os Lobos, recording the compact Fanny by the label Top Tape. After this beginning of career, he quit the group to study to be a doctor, until graduating. In 1974, he started his solo career recording a compact for Odeon. The success however only would appear in the 1980s, precisely in 1981, with the song Bem-te-vi, in partnership with Cláudio Rabelo but sung by Renato Terra, which sold 250 thousand copies.

In the next year, he already composing and singing, had his biggest hit, Muito Estranho, released in compact and LP record by EMI-Odeon.

Another big hit of the composer is the song "Anjo", recorded in 1983 by the group Roupa Nova, composed in partnership with Cláudio Rabello and Renato Correa.

Recently Dalto composed to the sound track of the soap opera Viver a Vida with the song "Faça um Pedido".

== Discography ==
- 1974 — Leila Ly/Flash back, Odeon (Compact)
- 1982 — Muito estranho, EMI-Odeon (LP)
- 1983 — Pessoa, Dalto, EMI-Music Brasil(LP)
- 1985 — Kama Sutra, Odeon (LP)
- 1987 — Um coração em mil (Quase não dá para ser feliz), 3M (LP)
- 1994 — Guru, EMI (LP/CD)
- 1996 — Meus momentos, série EMI Music (CD 852468 2)
- 2000 — Cachorro fujão, Casa Jorge Discos (CD)
- 2003 — 2 in 1 series: Muito estranho (1982) & Pessoa, Dalto (1983), EMI Music (CD 584519 2)

== See also ==
- Música popular brasileira
