= Ronaldo Bôscoli =

Brazilian composer (1928–1994)

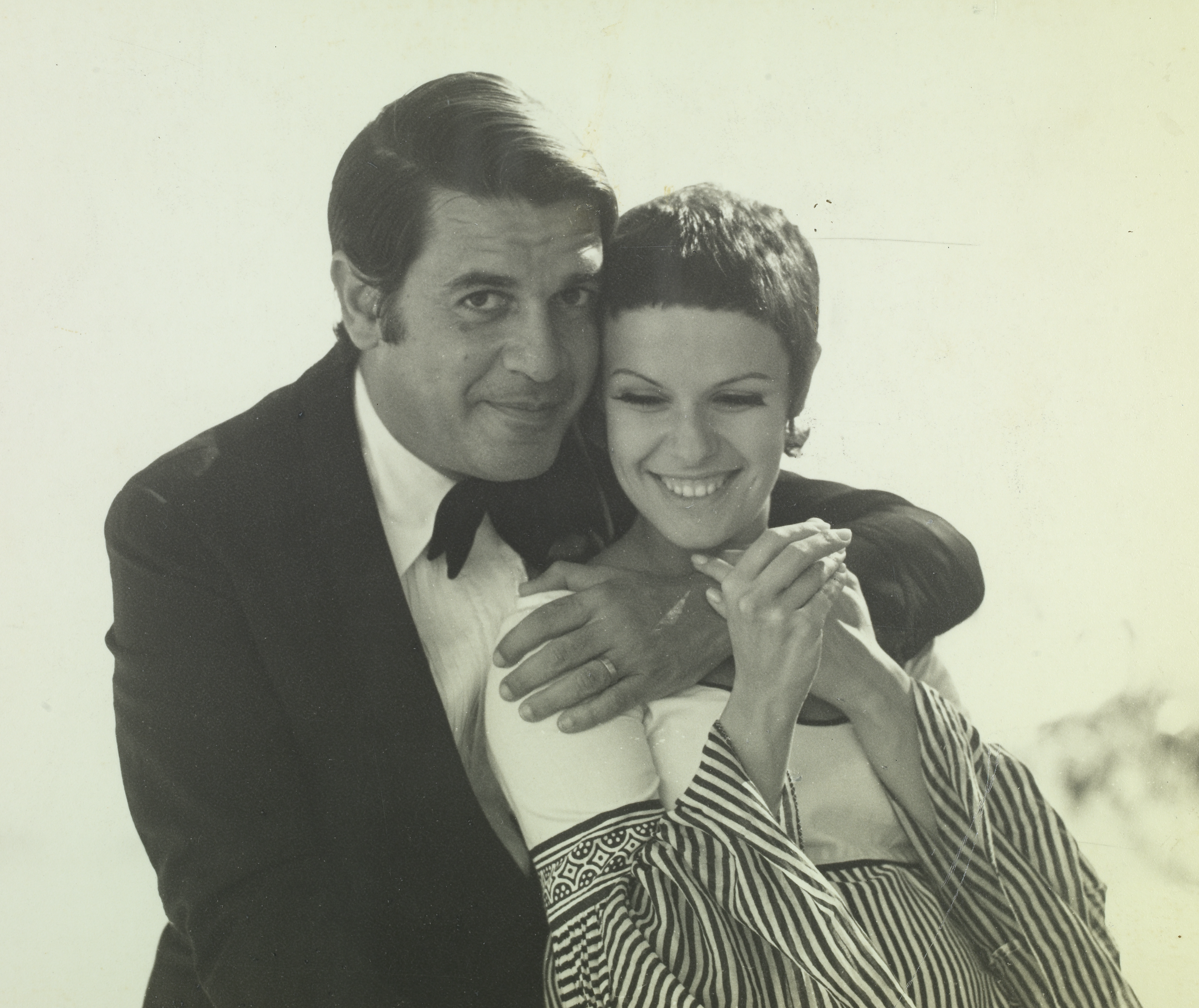
- Boscoli and wife Elis Regina in 1970

Background information
- Born: Ronaldo Fernando Esquerdo Bôscoli; 28 October 1928; Rio de Janeiro, Brazil
- Died: 18 November 1994 (aged 66) Rio de Janeiro, Brazil
- Genres: Bossa nova
- Occupations: Journalist, songwriter, musician, composer, artistic director
- Years active: 1957–1994

Ronaldo Fernando Esquerdo Bôscoli, usually known as Ronaldo Bôscoli, or just Bôscoli (28 October 1928 – 18 November 1994) was a Brazilian composer, songwriter, record producer and journalist.

He was very active and significant in the creation and development of the Bossa nova style in Brazil.
