= Geraldo Pereira (musician) =

- Birth name: Geraldo Theodoro Pereira
- Born: April 23, 1918; Juiz de Fora, Brazil
- Died: May 8, 1955 (aged 37); Rio de Janeiro, Brazil
- Genres: samba
- Occupation(s): singer, songwriter
- Instrument(s): vocal, guitar
- Years active: 1938–1954

Geraldo Theodoro Pereira, known as Geraldo Pereira, (Juiz de Fora, April 23, 1918 – Rio de Janeiro, May 8, 1955) was a Brazilian singer and samba composer. He was a major figure in the development of samba in Rio de Janeiro.
