= Eliane Elias =

Brazilian jazz musician (born 1960)

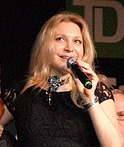
- Elias in 2004

Background information
- Born: 19 March 1960 (age 66); São Paulo, Brazil
- Genres: Jazz, bossa nova, Brazilian and Latin jazz
- Occupations: Musician, pianist, composer, arranger, producer
- Instruments: Piano, vocals
- Years active: 1981–present
- Labels: Denon, Blue Note, EMI, RCA, Sony/BMG, ECM, Concord, Candid
- Website: Official site

Eliane Elias (born 19 March 1960) is a Brazilian jazz pianist, singer, composer and arranger.

== Biography ==
Eliane Elias was born in São Paulo, Brazil, on 19 March 1960. She started studying piano when she was seven, and at age twelve she was transcribing solos from jazz musicians. She began teaching piano when she was fifteen, and began performing at seventeen with Brazilian singer-songwriter Toquinho and touring with the poet Vinicius de Moraes. At that age, she was also invited to tour with Antônio Carlos Jobim, considered the pioneer of bossa nova music.

In 1981. she moved to New York City, where she attended The Juilliard School of Music. A year later she became part of the group Steps Ahead. In 1993, Elias signed with EMI Classics to record classical pieces, which were released on On the Classical Side.

In 2001, Calle 54, a documentary film by Spanish director Fernando Trueba, included Elias performing "Samba Triste." In 1990, she released Eliane Elias Plays Jobim dedicated to the works of Antônio Carlos Jobim. Her thirteenth album, Eliane Elias Sings Jobim, is a second round of Jobim's music. It was released on July 28, 1998 via Blue Note label. In 2002, she recorded The Lost Days with Denyce Graves, for whom she wrote a composition entitled "HaabiaTupi." In 2002, Elias signed with RCA/Bluebird, which issued Kissed by Nature. Dreamer was released in 2004 and received the Gold Disc Award, as well as being voted Best Vocal Album in Japan. It reached No. 3 on the pop charts in France and No. 4 on the Billboard magazine charts in the U.S. Around the City was released by RCA Victor in August 2006. In 2007, Elias released Something for You, which won Best Vocal Album of the Year and the Gold Disc Award in Japan. Something for You reached No. 1 on the U.S. jazz charts, No. 8 on Billboard, and No. 2 on the French jazz charts. In 2008, she recorded Bossa Nova Stories to celebrate the 50th anniversary of bossa nova.

In 2009, EMI Japan released Eliane Elias Plays Live. Light My Fire, released in 2011, features four compositions written or co-written by Elias and includes covers of songs by the Doors, Stevie Wonder, and Paul Desmond. In September 2011, her song "What About the Heart (Bate Bate)" was nominated for a Latin Grammy in the category of Best Brazilian Song. In 2012, she collaborated with bassist Marc Johnson on the album Swept Away, the Editor's and Critics' choice in 2012 DownBeat and Jazztimes magazines, respectively. Her 2013 release, I Thought About You, reached No. 1 on the U.S. and French Amazon.com websites; No. 2 on iTunes U.S., France and Brazil; and No. 4 on Billboard.

Made in Brazil was followed by Dance of Time, which debuted at No. 1 on two Billboard: jazz and world music. Both Made in Brazil and Dance of Time debuted at No. 1 on iTunes in seven countries and won Grammy awards for Best Latin Jazz Album of the Year.

Her 2019 album Love Stories reached the No. 1 position as Best Seller Amazon.com Latin Jazz, No. 1 Best Seller Amazon.com Brazilian Jazz and No. 2 Best Seller Amazon.com Orchestral.

Her 2021 album Mirror, Mirror, which she recorded with Chick Corea and Chucho Valdés, won the Grammy Award for Best Latin Jazz Album.

== Personal life ==
Elias is Brazilian, of Lebanese descent.

She was married to American trumpeter Randy Brecker, with whom she has a daughter, the singer/songwriter Amanda Elias Brecker, born in 1984.

Elias married Marc Johnson in 1999, who plays bass in her band and co-produces her recordings.

== Awards ==
- 1995: Grammy nomination, Best Jazz Solo Performance, Solos and Duets with Herbie Hancock
- 1997: Best Jazz Album, DownBeat magazine Readers' Poll, The Three Americas
- 1998: Grammy nomination, Best Large Jazz Ensemble, Impulsive with Bob Brookmeyer and The Danish Radio Jazz Orchestra
- 2002: Grammy nomination, Best Latin Jazz Album, Calle 54
- 2011: Latin Grammy nomination, Best Brazilian Song, What About the Heart (Bate Bate)
- 2015: Latin Grammy nomination for Best Engineered Album, Made in Brazil
- 2016: Grammy Award winner for Best Latin Jazz Album, Made in Brazil
- 2017: Latin Grammy nomination for Best Engineered Album, Dance of Time
- 2017: Latin Grammy Award winner for Best Latin Jazz/Jazz Album, Dance of Time
- 2017: Libera Awards Nominee for Best Latin Jazz Album Dance of Time
- 2018: Winner of the Edison Lifetime Achievement Award (Holland)
- Five times Gold Disc Awards (Japan)
- 2019: Masterpiece award "Love Stories" (5 stars by DownBeat magazine)
- 2021: Masterpiece award "Mirror Mirror" (5 stars by DownBeat magazine)
- 2022: Grammy Award winner for Best Latin Jazz Album, Mirror Mirror
- 2022: Latin Grammy Award winner for Best Latin Jazz/Jazz Album, Mirror Mirror
- 2023: Libera Awards Nominee for Best Latin Jazz Album Quietude
- 2023: Latin Grammy Award nomination for Best Engineered Album Quietude
- 2025: Grammy Award nomination for Best Latin Jazz AlbumTime and Again

== Discography ==
=== As leader ===
- Amanda with Randy Brecker (Passport Jazz, 1985)
- Illusions (Denon, 1986)
- Cross Currents (Denon, 1987)
- So Far So Close (Blue Note, 1989)
- Eliane Elias Plays Jobim (Blue Note, 1990)
- A Long Story (Manhattan, 1991)
- Fantasia (Blue Note, 1992)
- Paulistana (Blue Note, 1993)
- On the Classical Side (EMI Classics, 1993)
- Solos and Duets with Herbie Hancock (Blue Note, 1995)
- Impulsive! with Bob Brookmeyer & Danish Radio Jazz Orchestra (Stunt, 1997)
- The Three Americas (Blue Note, 1997)
- Eliane Elias Sings Jobim (Blue Note, 1998)
- Everything I Love (Blue Note, 2000)
- Kissed by Nature (Bluebird, 2002)
- Portrait of Bill Evans (JVC, 2002) [2 tracks]
- Brazilian Classics (Blue Note, 2003)
- Dreamer (Bluebird, 2004)
- Around the City (RCA Victor, 2006)
- Something for You: Eliane Elias Sings & Plays Bill Evans (Blue Note, 2007)
- Bossa Nova Stories (Blue Note, 2008)
- Eliane Elias Plays Live (Blue Note, 2009)
- Light My Fire (Concord Picante, 2011)
- Swept Away with Marc Johnson (ECM, 2012)
- I Thought About You (Concord Jazz, 2013)
- Made in Brazil (Concord Jazz, 2015)
- Dance of Time (Concord Jazz, 2017)
- Music from Man of La Mancha (Concord Jazz, 2018)
- Love Stories (Concord Jazz, 2019)
- Mirror Mirror with Chick Corea and Chucho Valdés (Candid, 2021)
- Quietude (Candid, 2022)
- Time and Again (Candid, 2024)

With Steps Ahead

- Steps Ahead (Elektra Musician, 1983)
- Holding Together (NYC, 2002)

=== As guest ===
- Brecker Brothers, Out of the Loop (GRP, 1994)
- Urszula Dudziak, Sorrow Is Not Forever...But Love Is (Keytone, 1983)
- Peter Erskine, Motion Poet (Denon, 1988)
- Michael Franks, Abandoned Garden (Warner Bros., 1995)
- Denyce Graves, The Lost Days (BMG, 2002)
- Joe Henderson, Double Rainbow: The Music of Antonio Carlos Jobim (Verve, 1995)
- Toninho Horta, Moonstone (Verve Forecast, 1989)
- Marc Johnson, Shades of Jade (ECM, 2005)
- Earl Klugh, Midnight in San Juan (Warner, 1991)
- Ivo Perelman, Ivo (King, 1989)
- Andy Summers, World Gone Strange (Private Music, 1991)
- Toots Thielemans, The Brasil Project (Private Music, 1992)
- Toots Thielemans, The Brasil Project Vol. 2 (Private Music, 1993)
- Ornella Vanoni, Ornella &... (CGD, 1986)

== See also ==
- List of jazz arrangers
