= Brazilian jazz =

Genre of music

Brazilian jazz can refer to both a genre, largely influenced by bossa nova and samba, that exists in many nations and the jazz music of Brazil itself.

== Música instrumental Brasileira ==
The term "música instrumental Brasileira", which literally means "Brazilian instrumental music", is used in Brazil as an umbrella term to refer to jazz as well as several instrumental forms of art music drawing on national styles such as choro, samba and bossa nova. The term's ambiguity allows for the fact that Brazilian musicians themselves do not always have much in common with each other and might be willing to play in several genres. Terms for subgenres such as brazuca, ecm, and fusion are more specific to jazz.

Examples of musicians associated with this instrumental style include Hermeto Pascoal, Egberto Gismonti, Moacir Santos, and Zimbo Trio.

Jazz or jazz-influenced music has at times been controversial for being seen as representing a foreign "contamination" of native forms like choro. On the other hand bossa nova, a jazz influenced form of Brazilian music, was popular among the upper-class and sometimes faced criticism for being "bourgeois."

== Bossa nova and jazz ==
Bossa's relationship to jazz, and popularity with American jazz musicians, led to Brazilian musicians, such as Airto Moreira and Flora Purim, spending time in the United States and connecting to its jazz scene. This, combined with earlier collaborations between America jazz musicians and bossa nova artists, also led to "Brazilian jazz" as a kind of genre American musicians, notably Stan Getz and Charlie Byrd played.

== See also ==
- Bossa nova
- Samba-jazz
