= Candid Records (UK) albums discography =

British jazz record label (founded 1989)

Candid Records (UK)
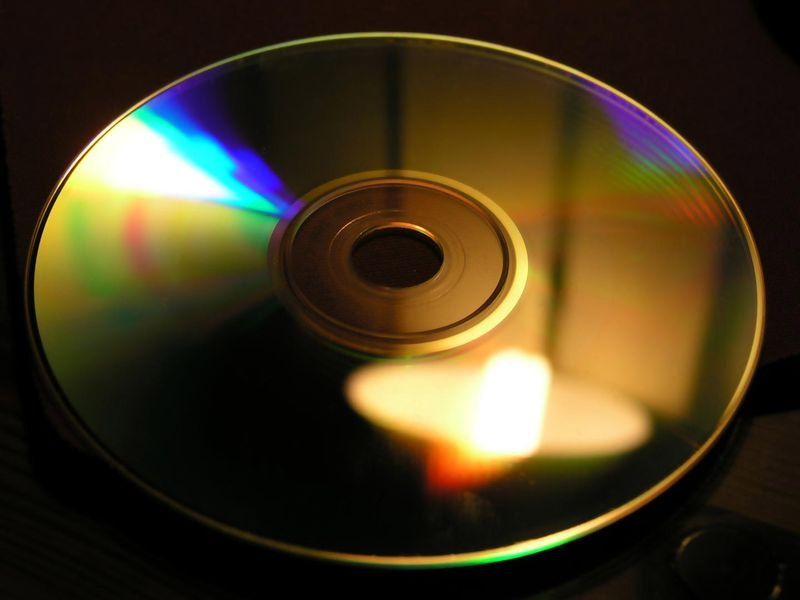
- Parent company: Black Lion Records
- Founded: 1989
- Founder: Alan Bates
- Genre: Jazz, world music
- Country of origin: United Kingdom
- Location: London
- Official website: propermusic.com/collections/candid-records

In 1989, Archie Bleyer's early-1960s Candid Records catalog was bought by Black Lion Productions based in London, which reissued the label's legacy vinyl records into the Compact Disc format, and further adapted its distribution towards music download technology in the succeeding decades. The revitalized Candid Records (UK) subsequently produced new, contemporary jazz recordings to further expand its line.

Artist	Album	Catalog	Year of CD release
Abbey Lincoln	Straight Ahead	CCD 79015	2000
Air, featuring Henry Threadgill	Air Song	WNCD 79403	2009
Air, featuring Henry Threadgill	Air Raid	WNCD 79413	2010
Al Haig & Jimmy Raney	Freedom Jazz Dance	CHCD 71010	2010
Alec Dankworth	If You're Passing By	CCD 79773	2003
Alex Wilson	Afro Saxon	BCCD 79201	1998
Alex Wilson	Anglo Cubano	BCCD 79205	1999
Alex Wilson	R & B Latino	ZOCD 78502	2001
Art Hodes	Keepin' Out of Mischief Now	CCD 79717	1995
Art Hodes	Pagin' Mr. Jelly	CCD 79037	1989
As Meninas	Bon Dia	CCD 79207	2000
Barry Harris Kenny Barron Quartet	Confirmation	CCD 79519	1992
Ben Webster	In a Mellotone	CCS 79106	2012
Benny Bailey	Big Brass	CCD 79011	2002
Bill Evans Trio	Autumn Leaves	CCD 79565	2014
Bill Perkins	Spring Swing	CCD 79752	2013
Bill Perkins With The Metropole Orchestra	I Wished on the Moon	CCD 79524	1992
Blue Mitchell	Stablemates	CCD 79553	
Bob Brookmayer & Tom Harrell	Shadow Box	CHCD 71021	
Bob Dorough	Small Day Tomorrow	CCD 79844	
Booker Ervin	That's It!	CCD 79014	1988
Booker Little	Out Front	CCD 79027	1989
Brian Trainor	Portraits	CCD 79731	1996
Bruce Forman	Coast To Coast	CHCD 71026	
Bud Shank	I Told You So!	CCD 79533	1993
Bud Shank	Live At The Haig	CHCD 71030	2007
Bud Shank	New Gold	CCD 79707	
Bud Shank	The Doctor Is In	CCD 79520	
Buddy Childers Big Band	Just Buddy's	CCD 79761	2001
Buddy Childers Big Band	What's Happening Now!	CCD 79749	2000
Buddy Childers with the Russ Garcia Strings	Artistry in Jazz	CCD 79735	1996
Buddy deFranco	Free Fall	CHCD 71008	1996
Buddy deFranco	Lush Life	CHCD 71017	
Buddy Featherstonhaugh & The Radio Rhythm Club Sextet	RAF Bomb	CYCD 74508	
Buddy Greco	Jazz Grooves	CCD 79755	
Buddy Greco	Route 66: A Tribute to Nat King Cole	CYCD 71901	
Cal Massey	Blues to Coltrane	CCD 79029	
Cameron Pierre	Friday Night	CCD 79743	1997
Cameron Pierre	Return To The Source	BCCD 79202	
Cameron Pierre	The Other Side of Notting Hill	BCCD 79211	2002
Candid Jazz Masters	For Miles	CCD 79710	1995
Carol Sloane	Something Cool	CHCD 71025	
Catherine Tuttle	What They Will Find	ZOCD 78505	
Cecil Taylor	Jumpin' Punkins	CCD 79013	2000
Cecil Taylor	The World Of Cecil Taylor	CCD 79006	1989
Cecil Taylor	Air	CCD 79046	1990
Cecil Taylor All Stars featuring Buell Neidlinger	New York City R & B	CCD 79017	1989
Cecil Taylor All Stars featuring Buell Neidlinger	Cell Walk For Celeste	CCD 79034	2000
Chamber Jazz Sextet	Plays Pal Joey	CCD 79030	1989
Charles Mingus	Reincarnation Of A Love Bird	CCD 79026	1988
Charles Mingus	Charles Mingus Presents Charles Mingus	CCD 79005	1989
Charles Mingus	Mysterious Blues	CCD 79042	1990
Charles Mingus	Charles Mingus and the Newport Rebels	CCD 79022	1991
Charles Mingus	Mingus	CCD 79021	1999
Charles Sullivan	Re-Entry	WNCD 79409	
Chet Baker	Milestones	CHCD 71042	2010
Chico Freeman	Lord Riff And Me	WNCD 79421	2010
Chuck Wayne & Joe Puma	Interactions	CHCD 71004	
Clare Teal	That's The Way It Is	CCD 79767	2001
Clare Teal	Orsino's Songs	CCD 79783	2002
Clare Teal	The Road Less Travelled	CCD 79794	2003
Clark Terry	Color Changes	CCD 79009	2000
Clark Terry	The Hymn	CCD 79770	2001
Clark Terry	The Incomparable	CCD 71808	2015
Claudio Roditi	Milestones	CCD 79515	1992
Claudio Roditi	Two of Swords	CCD 79804	
Cormac Kenevey	The Art of Dreaming	CCD 79853	
Cormac Kenevey	This Is Living	CCD 79846	
Count Basie, The Atomic Band	In A Mellotone	CCD 79558	2012
Craig Bailey	A New Journey	CCD 79725	1995
Dave Brubeck featuring Paul Desmond	Gone with the Wind	CCD 79563	2013
Dave Liebman	Classic Ballads	CCD 79512	1991
Dave Liebman	Joy: The Music of John Coltrane	CCD 79531	1993
Dave O'Higgins	Big Shake Up	BCCD 79208	
Dave O'Higgins	Fast Foot Shuffle	CCD 79772	2002
David Jean-Baptiste	Feeling Tones	CCD 79744	1997
David Jean-Baptiste	Neuriba	BCCD 79204	1998
David "Fathead" Newman Quintet plus Clifford Jordan	Blue Head	CCD 79041	1990
David Newton	12TH of the 12TH, A Portrait of Frank Sinatra	CCD 79728	1995
David Newton	DNA	CCD 79742	1997
David Newton Trio	In Good Company	CCD 79714	1995
Dimitri Vassilakis	Across The Universe	ZOCD 78507	2010
Dimitri Vassilakis	Labyrinth / Daedalus Project	CCD 79776	2001
Dimitri Vassilakis	Parallel Lines	CCD 79792	2005
Dimitri Vassilakis	Secret Path	CCD 79765	1998
Dizzy Gillespie Big Band	Groovin' High	CCD 79556	2011
Don Bennett	Chicago Calling	CCD 79713	1995
Don Bennett	Simplexity	CCD 79733	
Don Bennett	Solar	CCD 79723	
Don Ellis	How Time Passes	CCD 79004	2006
Don Ellis	Out of Nowhere	CCD 79032	1989
Don Pullen	Plays Monk	WNCD 79418	
Donald Harrison	For Art's Sake	CCD 79501	1991
Donald Harrison	Kind Of New	CCD 79768	2002
Donald Harrison, Jr.	Spirits Of Congo Square	CCD 79759	2000
Donald Harrison featuring Dr. John	Indian Blues	CCD 79514	1992
Donald Smith	Luv	WNCD 79411	
Dr. John Meets Donald Harrison	New Orleans Gumbo	CCD 71806	2013
Duke Ellington	Flying Home	CCD 79557	2011
Eddie Daniels with Bucky Pizzarelli	Blue Bossa	CHCD 71002	2004
Elisabetta Antonini	The Beat Goes On	CCD 79868	2015
Eric Dolphy	Candid Dolphy	CCD 79033	1989
Erica Lindsay	Dreamer	CCD 79040	1989
Erroll Garner Trio	Coast To Coast	CCD 79566	2014
Flip Philips	Spanish Eyes	CHCD 71013	
Gary Bartz	There Goes the Neighborhood!	CCD 79806	
Gary Bartz	West 42nd Street	CCD 79049	
Gene DiNovi	Live At The Montreal Bistro	CCD 79726	1995
Gene DiNovi	Renaissance Of Jazz	CCD 79708	
Geoff Gascoyne	Keep It To Yourself	CCD 79798	2007
George Cables	Why Not?	WNCD 79402	
George Melly	Ultimate Melly	CCD 79843	
Gerry Mulligan Quartet	Moonlight in Vermont	CCD 79559	2011
Get The Blessing	All Is Yes	CACD 78550	2008
Get The Blessing	Bugs in Amber	CACD 78558	2009
Gilson	Lampiao	CCD 79790	2005
Greg Abate Quartet	Bop City, Live at Birdland	CCD 79513	1991
Greg Abate	Straight Ahead	CCD 79530	
Greg Abate Quintet featuring Richie Cole	Dr. Jekyll & Mr. Hyde	CCD 79715	1995
Guillermo Klein	El Minotauro	CCD 79706	
Gustavo Marques y Pororocas	Jazz Popular Brasileira	CCD 79793	2005
Harry Edison	Swing Summit	CCD 79050	
Hector Martignon	A Portrait In Black & White	CCD 79727	1996
Hector Martignon	Foreign Affair	CCD 79746	
Hendrik Meurkens	Dig This Samba	CCD 79747	1998
Hilton Ruiz	Live At Birdland	CCD 79532	1992
Ingrid Laubrock	Who Is It?	CCD 79745	1998
Ingrid Laubrock	Some Times	CCD 79774	2001
Irene Kral	The Gentle Rain	CHCD 71020	2001
Irene Kral	Where Is Love?	CHCD 71012	
Jacqui Dankworth	As The Sun Shines Down On Me	CCD 79788	2001
Jacqui Dankworth	Detour Ahead	CCD 79796	2004
Jaki Byard	Blues for Smoke	CCD 79018	1989
Jamie Cullum	Pointless Nostalgic	CCD 79782	2002
Jamie Cullum & Friends	Devil May Care	CCD 79351	2010
Jazz Artists Guild	Newport Rebels	CCD 79022	
Jeff Jerolamon	Introducing	CCD 79522	1992
Jeff Jerolamon	Swing Thing!	CCD 79538	
Jessica Williams	Ain't Misbehavin	CCD 79763	2000
Jessica Williams	Gratitude	CCD 79721	1996
Jessica Williams	Higher Standards	CCD 79736	1997
Jessica Williams	Jazz In The Afternoon	CCD 79750	
Jim Tomlinson	Only Trust Your Heart	CCD 79758	1999
Jim Tomlinson	Brazilian Sketches	CCD 79769	2001
Jimmy Giuffre	The Train And The River	CHCD 71011	
Jimmy Rowles Trio	The Chess Players	CHCD 71023	
Jimmy Rowles Trio	Jam Face	CHCD 71014	
Joanne Brackeen	Six Ate	CHCD 71009	
Joanne Brackeen	Tring-a-Ling	CHCD 71016	2009
Joanne Brackeen	Meets Eddie Gomez	CHCD 71024	
Joe Chambers	Phantom of the City	CCD 79517	1992
Joe Lee Wilson	Feelin' Good	BCCD 79210	
Joe Lee Wilson	Shout For Trane	WNCD 79408	
Joe Stilgoe	I Like This One	CCD 79851	2008
Johnny Alegre	Jazzhound	CCD 79842	2005
Joseph Bonner	Triangle	WNCD79405	
Kenny Barron	Confirmation	CCD 79819	
Kenny Barron	Flight Path	CCD 71809	
Kenny Barron	Live!	WNCD 79417	2010
Kenny Barron	Rhythm-a-Ning	CCD 79044	
Kenny Barron Trio	Lemuria Seascape	CCD 79508	1991
Klaus Ignatzek	All Systems Go!	CCD 79738	1997
Klaus Ignatzek	Return Voyage	CCD 79716	
Klaus Ignatzek	Silent Horns	CCD 79729	
Klaus Ignatzek	The Answer	CCD 79534	
Kyle Eastwood	Paris Blue	CCD 79789	2005
Kyle Eastwood	NOW	CCD 79845	2006
Kyle Eastwood	Metropolitain	CCD 79856	2009
Kyle Eastwood	Songs From The Chateau	CCD 79867	2011
Ladine Roxas	How Can I Make You Love Me?	ZOCD 74501	2002
Larry Gales	A Message From Monk	CCD 79503	1991
Lee Konitz	Lullaby of Birdland	CCD 79709	1995
Lee Konitz	Wild As Springtime	CCD 79734	
Lee Konitz	Tenorlee	CHCD 71019	2000
Lee Morgan with Art Blakey & The Jazz Messengers	I Remember Clifford	CCD 79555	2011
Leee John	Feel My Soul	CCD 79787	2005
Lenny Popkin	317 East 32ND	CHCD 71027	
Léo Gandelman	Bossa Rara	CCD 79994	2005
Lester Young	Too Marvellous For Words	CCD 79560	
Lezlie Anders	With Love, Lezlie	CYCD 74801	
Lightnin' Hopkins	Lightnin' In New York	CCD 79010	1989
Luis Bonilla	Escucha!	CCD 79748	1999
Luis Bonilla & The Latin Jazz All-Stars	Pasos Gigantes	CCD 79507	1991
Louis Hayes	The Crawl	CCD 79045	
Lucky Thompson	Lord, Lord, Am I Ever Gonna Know?	CCD 79035	1997
Marco Marconi	Mosaico	CCD 79991	2015
Mark Morganelli	Speak Low	CCD 79054	2000
Mark Morganelli	Speak Low	CCD 79054	
Marty Paich	The Picasso Of Big Band Jazz	CCD 79031	
Max Roach	Candid Roach	CCD 79038	2009
Max Roach	We Insist!	CCD 79002	
Memphis Slim	A Tribute To Big Bill Broonzy	CCD 79023	2001
Memphis Slim	Memphis Slim, U.S.A.	CCD 79024	2000
Manhattan Graffiti Four (MG4)	Manhattan Graffiti Four	WNCD 79419	1988
Mike Cain	Strange Omen	CCD 79505	1991
Mike Cain	What Means This?	CCD 79529	1992
Mina Agossi	Simple Things	CCD 79864	
Mina Agossi	Well You Needn't	CCD 79841	
Mina Agossi	Who Wants Love	CCD 79855	
Mina Agossi	Zaboum!	CCD 79800	2005
Mishka Adams	God Bless The Child	CCD 79799	2005
Mishka Adams	Space	CCD 79847	2007
Mishka Adams	Stranger On The Shore	CCD 79858	2012
Mishka Adams	Willow Weep For Me	CCD 79352	
Modern Jazz Quartet	Round Midnight	CCD 79564	
Mongo Santamaria	Brazilian Sunset	CCD 79703	1995
Monica Vasconcelos & Nóis	Oferenda	CCD 79791	2002
Monty Waters	The Black Cat	WNCD 79406	2010
Muhal Richard Abrams	Afrisong	WNCD 79404	2009
Nancy Harrow	Wild Women Don't Have The Blues	CCD 79008	
Nate Najar Trio	This Is Nate Najar	CCD 79979	2016
Nate Najar Trio	Aquarela do Brasil	CCD 79988	2014
Nate Najar Trio	A Collection of Classic Love Songs	CCD 79992	2013
Nate Najar Trio	Blues For Night People	CCD 79992	2012
Nelli Rees	Jazz Noir	ZOCD 78503	2003
Neil Cowley Trio	Loud Louder Stop	CACD 78551	2008
Nicki Leighton-Thomas	Forbidden Games	CCD 79778	2001
Nóis 4	Bom Dia	CCD 79779	
Nóis 4	Gente	CCD 79784	2005
Olga Konkova	Her Point of View	CCD 79757	1999
Olga Konkova	Some Things From Home	CCD 79777	
Olga Konkova, Per Mathisen	Northern Crossings	CCD 79766	2000
Omar Valle	Españolada Con Swing	BCCD 79203	
Otis Spann	Otis Spann Is the Blues	CCD 79001	1989
Otis Spann	Walking the Blues	CCD 79025	
Paquito D'Rivera	Who's Smoking?!	CCD 79823	2007
Pee Wee Russell - Coleman Hawkins	Jazz Reunion	CCD 79020	2000
Phil Woods	Rights of Swing	CCD 79016	
Quincy Jones Big Band	Free And Easy! Live in Sweden 1960	CCD 79561	2013
Ray Crawford	Smooth Groove	CCD 79028	
Richard Williams	New Horn In Town	CCD 79003	1989
Rickey Woodward	California Cooking!	CCD 79509	1991
Rickey Woodward	California Cooking #2	CCD 79762	2001
Rickey Woodward	Tokyo Express	CCD 79527	
Ricky Ford	American-African Blues	CCD 79528	1993
Ricky Ford	Ebony Rhapsody	CCD 79053	1990
Ricky Ford	Hot Brass	CCD 79518	1992
Ricky Ford	Manhattan Blues	CCD 79036	1989
Robun McKelle	Introducing	CCD 79996	
Rod Blake	Step Into The Light	BCCD 79206	
Roger Kellaway	Ain't Misbehavin'	CHCD 71033	2009
Roland Hanna	Sir Elf	CHCD 71003	
Roland Hanna	Sir Elf Plus One	CHCD 71018	2013
Roland Kirk	Gifts And Messages	CCS 79105	2010
Ronnie Scott	Secret Love	CCS 79103	
Ruby Braff	As Time Goes By	CCD 79741	2000
Sarah Mitchell	You Give Me Something	CCD 79857	2009
Seldon Powell	End Play	CCD 79732	
Shanti Paul Jayasinha	Round Trip	CCD 79848	
Sheila Cooper	Tales Of Love And Longing	CCD 79849	
Shirley Scott	À Walking Thing	CCD 79719	1996
Shirley Scott	Blues Everywhere	CCD 79525	1992
Shirley Scott Trio	Skylark	CCD 79705	2000
Shorty Rogers, Bud Shank, & The Lighthouse All Stars	Eight Brothers	CCD 79821	1992
Shorty Rogers, Bud Shank, & The Lighthouse All Stars	America The Beautiful	CCD 79810	1991
Sonny Fortune	Invitation	WNCD 79420	2010
Stacey Kent	Close Your Eyes	CCD 79737	1997
Stacey Kent	Love Is...The Tender Trap		1999
Stacey Kent	Let Yourself Go: Celebrating Fred Astaire	CCD 79764	2000
Stacey Kent	Dreamsville	CCD 79775	2001
Stacey Kent	In Love Again: The Music of Richard Rodgers	CCD 79786	2002
Stacey Kent	Collection	CCD 79999	2002
Stacey Kent	The Boy Next Door	CCD 79797	2003
Stacey Kent	The Boy Next Door (Special Edition)	CCD 79993	2003
Stacey Kent	Collection II	CCD 79997	2007
Stacey Kent	Collection III	CCD 79995	2009
Stacey Kent & Jim Tomlinson	A Fine Romance	CCD 79354	2010
Stacey Kent	Hushabye Mountain	CCD 71804	2011
Stacey Kent	Candid Moments	CCD 79901	2011
Stacey Kent	It's A Wonderful World	CSET 70501	2012
Stan Getz	Born To Be Blue	CCD 79562	2013
Stan Kenton	One Night Stand	CHCD 71051	2002
Steve Hobbs	On The Lower East Side	CCD 79758	1993
Steve Hobbs	Second Encounter	CCD 79760	2001
Sumi Tonooka	Here Comes Kai	CCD 79516	1992
Sumi Tonooka	Taking Time	CCD 79502	
Ted Curson	Blue Piccolo	WNCD 79410	2010
Terell Stafford	Centripetal Force	CCD 79718	1997
Terell Stafford	Time To Let Go	CCD 79702	2000
The Basie Alumni	Swing For The Count	CCD 79724	
The Great British Jazz Band	A British Jazz Odyssey	CCD 79740	1999
The Great British Jazz Band	Jubilee	CCD 79720	1995
The Great British Jazz Band	Swing That Music!	CCD 79780	
The New York Guitar Ensemble	Four On Six	CHCD 71031	
The Ryoko Trio	Bonsai Bop	CCD 79852	2008
Thelonious Monk	The Classic Quartet	CCD 79551	2006
Toshiko-Mariano Quartet	The Toshiko–Mariano Quartet	CCD 79012	2001
Tom Richards	Smoke And Mirrors	CCD 79850	
Toots Thielemans	Images	CHCD 71007	2001
Tubby Hayes	Inventivity	CCS 79101/2	2010
Tubby Hayes	Tubby's New Groove	CCD 79554	2011
Tubby Hayes	Night And Day	CCD 79108	2013
Various Artists	Big City Grooves	BCCD 71200	2000
Various Artists	Cool Jazz for Hot Nights	CCD 71802	2000
Various Artists	Green Cuts (A Selection Of Tracks From Jazz On The Green)	CCD 71801	1998
Various Artists	A Bossa Nova Love Affair	CCD 71805	2013
Various Artists	The Magic of Jobim: The Enchanting Melodies of Antonio Carlos Jobim	CCD 71807	2014
Vic Lewis The West Coast All-Stars	Shake Down The Stars: The Music of Jimmy Van Heusen	CCD 79526	1992
Vic Lewis The West Coast All-Stars	Plays Bill Hollman	CCD 79535	1993
Vic Lewis	Presents A Celebration Of Contemporary West Coast Jazz	CCD 79711/12	1994
Vic Lewis The West Coast All-Stars	Me & You!	CCD 79739	1997
Vic Lewis	The Golden Years	CCD 79754	1999
Victor Feldman with Tom Scott	Seven Steps To Heaven	CHCD 71005	2009
Victor Feldman	Swinging On A Star	CCD 79107	2013
Walt Dickerson	1976	WNCD 79414	
Walt Dickerson	Tell Us Only The Beautiful Things	WNCD 79401	
Wes Montgomery	Body And Soul	CCS 79104	2010
New York Jazz Guitar Ensemble	Four On Six: A Tribute To Wes Montgomery	CHCD 71031	2012
Wilton "Bogey" Gaynair	Africa Calling	CCD 79552	2006
Woody Herman	One Night Stand	CHCD 71053	
Zoot Sims	Getting' Sentimental	CHCD 71006	
