= Dreamer In Concert =

Dreamer in Concert

Live album by Stacey Kent
- Released: March 27, 2012
- Recorded: May 30–31, 2011
- Genre: Vocal Jazz
- Length: 1:10:47
- Label: Blue Note
- Producer: Jim Tomlinson

Stacey Kent chronology
Raconte-moi... (2010)	Dreamer in Concert (2012)	The Changing Lights (2013)

Dreamer in Concert is a 2011 live album by Stacey Kent. This was Kent's first live album, and was recorded at the La Cigale theatre in Paris.

== Reception ==
John Fordham writing in The Guardian gave the album three stars out of five and commented that the loudest sounds on the album are "the audience cheering" and praised Kent's vocal abilities, highlighting her "expressive delicacy at low volumes, flexible phrasing and instinctive dialogues with her saxophonist husband, Jim Tomlinson". Fordham commented that "But Kent's rare and almost defiant sustained note at the close of the French-language Samba Saravah, a gritty robustness on If I Were a Bell, and the occasional Madeleine Peyroux-like elision on The Best Is Yet to Come give this set extra intrigue – even if devotees of edgier jazz will grumble that it's like having chocolate poured in your ear."

Writing for the Jazz Times, Christopher Loudon also positively reviewed Dreamer in Concert saying that "...it's hardly surprising to discover that she sounds as warm and inviting onstage as she does in the studio." Loudon singled out "O Comboio" and "Postcard Lovers" for special praise.

== Track listing ==
1. "It Might as Well Be Spring" (Oscar Hammerstein II, Richard Rodgers) – 7:29
2. "Ces Petits Riens" (Serge Gainsbourg) – 4:01
3. "Postcard Lovers" (Kazuo Ishiguro, Jim Tomlinson) – 6:19
4. "If I Were a Bell" (Frank Loesser) – 4:07
5. "Quiet Nights of Quiet Stars" (Antonio Carlos Jobim, Gene Lees) – 5:33
6. "Waters of March" (Jobim) – 3:59
7. "The Best Is Yet to Come" (Cy Coleman, Carolyn Leigh) – 3:36
8. "O Comboio" (Antonio Ladeira, Tomlinson) – 4:27
9. "Dreamer" (Jobim, Gene Lees) – 5:16
10. "Breakfast on the Morning Tram" (Ishiguro, Tomlinson) – 5:28
11. "They Can't Take That Away from Me" (George Gershwin, Ira Gershwin) – 5:19
12. "Samba Saravah" (Pierre Barouh, Vinícius de Moraes, Baden Powell) – 4:55
13. "Jardin D'Hiver" (Benjamin Biolay, Keren-Ann Zeidel) – 4:31
14. "They Say It's Wonderful" (Irving Berlin) – 5:47

== Personnel ==
Performance

- Stacey Kent – vocals, guitar
- Jim Tomlinson – arranger, percussion, producer, soprano saxophone, tenor saxophone
- Jeremy Brown – double bass
- Matt Skelton – drums, percussion
- Graham Harvey – fender rhodes, piano, inside photo

Production

- Nicolas Pflug – A&R
- Jean-Louis Duralek – artwork, photography
- João Paulo Nogueira – engineer
- Angloma – make-up
- Curtis Schwartz – mastering, mixing
