= The Lyric (album) =

2006 album by Jim Tomlinson, Stacey Kent

Studio album by Jim Tomlinson, Stacey Kent
- Released: September 12, 2006
- Recorded: August 9-10, 2005
- Genre: Jazz

Jim Tomlinson, Stacey Kent chronology
The Boy Next Door (2003)	The Lyric (2006)	Breakfast on the Morning Tram (2007)

The Lyric is a 2006 jazz album by saxophonist and percussionist Jim Tomlinson and vocalist Stacey Kent, who sings on ten of the thirteen tracks.

The Lyric won the Album of the Year award at the 2006 BBC Jazz Awards. The BBC's Gordon Miller recommended the album for its "craft, dedication and integrity". John Fordham of The Guardian described it as "a repertoire of standards and sambas" characterized by the artists' "musicianly and understatedly spontaneous take on smooth jazz".

== Track listing ==
1. "Manhã de Carnaval” (Luiz Bonfá and Antonio Maria) - 4:05
2. “Corcovado” (Antônio Carlos Jobim, Gene Lees) - 3:46
3. “I've Grown Accustomed To His Face” (Frederick Loewe, Alan Jay Lerner) - 4:51
4. “If I Were A Bell” (Frank Loesser) - 3:55
5. “I Got Lost In His Arms” (Irving Berlin) - 5:12
6. “What Are You Doing the Rest of Your Life?” (Michel Legrand, Alan Bergman, Marilyn Bergman) – 6:28
7. “Cockeyed Optimist” (Richard Rodgers, Oscar Hammerstein II) – 4:37
8. “My Heart Belongs to Daddy” (Cole Porter) – 3:41
9. “The Surrey With The Fringe On Top” (Richard Rodgers, Oscar Hammerstein ?) – 4:34
10. “Outra Vez” (Antônio Carlos Jobim) – 4:51
11. “Jardin D'hiver” (Keren Ann Zeidel, Benjamin Biolay) – 3:17
12. “Something Happens To Me” (Jack Segal, Marvin Fisher) – 3:51
13. “Stardust” (Hoagy Carmichael, Mitchell Parish) – 5:09

== Personnel ==
- Jim Tomlinson – tenor saxophone, percussion
- David Newton - piano
- Dave Chamberlain – double bass
- Matt Skelton - drums
- Stacey Kent – vocals (except 1 & 10), whistling (11)

Recorded at Curtis Schwartz Studios, 9–10 August 2005
