= Brazilian Sketches =

Studio album by Jim Tomlinson
- Released: April 22, 2003
- Recorded: April 13–14, 2001
- Genre: Jazz
- Length: 51:22
- Label: Candid
- Producer: Jim Tomlinson

Professional ratings
Review scores
Source	Rating
The Penguin Guide to Jazz Recordings	2.5/4 stars

Brazilian Sketches is an album by British saxophonist Jim Tomlinson that was released in 2003. The album features Stacey Kent on vocals. The album contains cover versions of songs by Antonio Carlos Jobim, Vinícius de Moraes, Marcos Valle, and Luiz Bonfá.

== Track listing ==
No.	Title	Writer(s)	Length
1.	"Dreamer"	Antônio Carlos Jobim	5:03
2.	"Caminhos Cruzados"	Jobim	4:13
3.	"Ligia"	Jobim	4:41
4.	"So Nice"	Marcos Valle	4:36
5.	"Só Danço Samba"	Jobim/Vinícius de Moraes	5:18
6.	"Once I Loved"	Jobim/de Moraes/Ray Gilbert	4:31
7.	"I Concentrate on You"	Cole Porter	6:34
8.	"Portrait in Black and White"	Jobim/Chico Buarque	3:37
9.	"She's a Carioca"	Jobim	3:40
10.	"The Gentle Rain"	Luiz Bonfá/Matt Dubey	4:23
11.	"No More Blues (Chega de Saudade)"	Jobim/de Moraes/Jon Hendricks/Jesse Cavanaugh	4:46

== Personnel ==
- Jim Tomlinson – tenor saxophone
- Stacey Kent – vocals
- Colin Oxley – guitar
- John Pearce – piano
- David Newton – piano
- Simon Thorpe – double bass
- Chris Wells – drums
