= Vivo Sonhando =

1962 bossa nova song by Antônio Carlos Jobim

Song by Os Cariocas

from the album Mais Bossa Com Os Cariocas
- Released: 1963
- Genre: Bossa nova
- Length: 2:35
- Label: Philips
- Songwriter: Antônio Carlos Jobim

"Vivo Sonhando" (a.k.a. "Dreamer", translated literally as "I Live Dreaming") is a bossa nova song from 1962 with words and music by Antônio Carlos Jobim. English lyrics were added later by Gene Lees.

In 1990, for a Brazilian album project, Susannah McCorkle received permission from Jobim to compose new lyrics in English, entitling her version, "Living on Dreams."

The first recording of "Vivo Sonhando" was by Os Cariocas in 1963. Jobim recorded an instrumental version the same year for his debut album, The Composer of Desafinado Plays, and recorded a vocal version in English on his 1980 album, Terra Brasilis.

== Recorded versions ==
- Os Cariocas - Mais Bossa Com Os Cariocas (1963)
- Antônio Carlos Jobim - The Composer of Desafinado Plays (1963), and Terra Brasilis (1980)
- Marcos Valle - Samba "Demais" (1963)
- Leny Andrade - A Arte Maior de Leny Andrade (1963)
- Eumir Deodato – Inútil Paisagem – As Maiores Composições de Antonio Carlos Jobim (1964)
- Stan Getz & João Gilberto (with Jobim) – Getz/Gilberto (1964)
- Sergio Mendes & Art Farmer (with Jobim) – The Swinger from Rio (1964)
- Dick Farney – Dick Farney (1965)
- Wanda Sá - Wanda Vagamente (1964), and Softly (1965)
- Sylvia Telles - Bossa Session: Sylvia Telles, Lúcio Alves, Roberto Menescal e Seu Conjunto (1964), and The Music of Mr. Jobim (1966)
- Dom Um Romão – Dom Um (1964)
- Astrud Gilberto (with Jobim) - The Astrud Gilberto Album (1965))
- Walter Wanderley – O Autêntico Walter Wanderley (1965)
- Billy Eckstine – Momento Brasileiro (1979)
- Sarah Vaughan – Copacabana (1979)
- Ella Fitzgerald – Ella Abraça Jobim (1981)
- Susannah McCorkle – Sabia (1990)
- Joe Henderson - Double Rainbow: The Music of Antonio Carlos Jobim (1995)
- João Donato - Só danço samba (1999)
- Ivan Lins - Jobiniando (2001)
- Jaques Morelenbaum, Paula Morelenbaum, and Ryuichi Sakamoto - Casa (2001)
- Jim Tomlinson - Brazilian Sketches (2003)
- Eliane Elias - Dreamer (2004)
- Stacey Kent – Dreamer In Concert (2011)
- Bebel Gilberto – Tudo (2014)
- Vinicius Cantuária – Vinicius Canta Antonio Carlos Jobim (2015)
