= The Gentle Rain =

1965 bossa nova composition by Luiz Bonfá

"The Gentle Rain" ("Chuva Delicada" in Portuguese) is a 1965 bossa nova composition by Brazilian guitarist Luiz Bonfá, with lyrics by Matt Dubey. Originally written in A minor, this song was first released as part of the motion picture soundtrack of the 1966 film The Gentle Rain by the American director Burt Balaban. The music of this film was a collaboration of Bonfá as composer and Eumir Deodato as orchestra arranger and director.

== Other recorded versions ==
It has become a jazz standard recorded instrumental, featured on the following albums:

- 1965: Quincy Jones and His Orchestra, Quincy Plays for Pussycats (Mercury)
- 1966: Scott Walker, Solo John/Solo Scott (Philips), and in the US, Portrait
- 1966: Ramsey Lewis, The Movie Album (Cadet)
- 1967: Joe Pass, Simplicity (World Pacific)
- 1968: Jimmy Smith, Livin' it Up! (Verve)
- 1969: George Shearing, The Fool on the Hill (Capitol)
- 1971: George Benson, Beyond the Blue Horizon (CTI)
- 1971: Oscar Peterson and The Singers Unlimited, In Tune (MPS)
- 1972: Art Farmer, Gentle Eyes (Mainstream)
- 1975: Toots Thielemans, Old Friend (Polydor)
- 1978: Joe Pass and Paulinho da Costa, Tudo Bem! (Pablo)
- 1979: Charlie Byrd, Sugarloaf Suite (Concord Jazz Picante)
- 1989: Kenny Drew Trio, Recollections (Timeless)
- 1991: Akio Sasajima and Ron Carter, Akioustically Sound (Muse)
- 2002: Joe Beck Trio, Just Friends (Whaling City Sound)
- 2003: John Etheridge, Chasing Shadows (Dyad)
- 2008: Ron Thomas and Paul Klinefelter, Blues for Zarathustra (Art of Life)
- 2018: Houston Person and Ron Carter, Remember Love (HighNote)

Astrud Gilberto recorded the song in 1965 on The Shadow of Your Smile. It is also reported to be one of Tony Bennett's favorites and recorded on his 1966 album The Movie Song Album featuring Luiz Bonfá on guitar. Other recordings were by Sarah Vaughan (on the 1976 album Copacabana), Irene Kral with pianist Alan Broadbent (on the 1978 album Gentle Rain), Shirley Horn (on the 1978 album A Lazy Afternoon), Diana Krall (on the 1997 album Love Scenes), Stacey Kent featuring vocals with the saxophonist Jim Tomlinson (on the 2003 album Brazilian Sketches), Ranee Lee (on the 2003 album Maple Groove), Barbra Streisand (on the 2009 album Love is the Answer), and Don Burrows.

Lynda Day George, who made her screen debut in the film in which "The Gentle Rain" first appeared, sings the song in a 1972 episode of Mission: Impossible "Trapped" (season six, episode 22). It was also played at the funeral of Irish guitarist Louis Stewart in 2016 in the presence of the president of the Irish Republic but misattributed to a non-Brazilian composer in The Irish Times's obituary.
