= (Love Is) The Tender Trap =

Song by Debbie Reynolds and Frank Sinatra

from the album The Tender Trap
- B-side: "Canoodlin' Rag"
- Released: 1955
- Genre: Traditional pop, big band
- Label: MGM
- Songwriter: Sammy Cahn
- Composer: Jimmy Van Heusen

"(Love Is) The Tender Trap" is a popular song composed by Jimmy Van Heusen, with lyrics by Sammy Cahn.

It was written for the 1955 film The Tender Trap, where it was introduced by Debbie Reynolds and Frank Sinatra, who each sing the song separately. It was nominated for the Academy Award for Best Original Song, but lost to "Love Is a Many-Splendored Thing" from the film of the same name.

A version by Frank Sinatra became a major hit in the United Kingdom, peaking at no. 2 in February 1956. It reached no. 7 in the US charts.

== Other recordings ==
- Bing Crosby recorded the song in 1955 for use on his radio show and it was subsequently included in the box set The Bing Crosby CBS Radio Recordings (1954–56) issued by Mosaic Records (catalog MD7-245) in 2009.
- Debbie Reynolds (1956).
- Denny Dennis (1956).
- Ella Fitzgerald (1956).
- Frank Sinatra recorded it again in 1962 for his album Sinatra–Basie: An Historic Musical First.
- Sammy Davis Jr. – for his album The Wham of Sam (1961)
- Billy Eckstine – for his album Don't Warry bout me (1962) "The Wham of Sam – Sammy Davis Jr.
- Robert Palmer – from the album Robert Palmer (1992), which was also used on the soundtrack of the film True Romance.
- Stacey Kent – included in her album Love Is...The Tender Trap (1998)
- Steve Lawrence – for his album Academy Award Losers (1964).
