= Close Your Eyes (Bernice Petkere song) =

Song
- Published: 1933
- Songwriter: Bernice Petkere

"Close Your Eyes" is a popular song written by American composer Bernice Petkere. The song was published in 1933 and first recorded that year by Freddy Martin & His Orchestra.

== Recorded versions ==
- Ruth Etting (1933)
- Al Bowlly (1933)
- Comedian Harmonists (1934), German version (as "Komm im Traum")
- Johnny Bode (1934), Swedish version
- Harry Belafonte (1949)
- Tony Bennett (1954)
- Humphrey Lyttelton (1956)
- Ella Fitzgerald (1957)
- Art Blakey and the Jazz Messengers (1959 [2020]) Just Coolin' album
- Oscar Peterson (1959)
- Gene Ammons (1960) Boss Tenor album
- Vic Damone (1962) Linger Awhile with Vic Damone album
- Michel Legrand (1962) Bravissimo album
- Doris Day (1957) Day By Night album, and (1962) Duet album
- Peggy Lee (1963)
- Nancy Wilson (1964)
- Arthur Prysock (1964) Everlasting Songs For Everlasting Lovers album
- Herb Ellis & Remo Palmier (1978) Windflower album
- Toni Tennille (1988) Do It Again album
- Kurt Elling (1995)
- Liza Minnelli (1996)
- Betty Carter (1996)
- Stacey Kent (1997) Close Your Eyes album
- Don Tiki (1997)
- Ray Barretto (2003) Homage To Art album
- Queen Latifah (2004)
- Roy Hargrove (2007 [2010]) Live at the New Morning DVD release
- Terez Montcalm (2007)
- Loston Harris (2008)
- Nellie McKay (2009)
- Alexis Cole (2013)
- Liv Stoveland (2010)
- Leonardo Zurita (2021)

== In popular culture ==
The song is featured in the film The Abominable Dr. Phibes (1971), during a murder scene, and in the 1996 BBC TV detective series The Mrs Bradley Mysteries, which starred Diana Rigg. The song was the end of transmission tune of Radio MonteCarlo in the 1960s.
