= Raconte-moi... =

Studio album by Stacey Kent
- Released: March 30, 2010
- Recorded: 2010
- Genre: Vocal jazz
- Length: 47:25
- Label: Blue Note
- Producer: Jim Tomlinson

Stacey Kent chronology
Breakfast on the Morning Tram (2007)	Raconte-moi... (2010)	Dreamer In Concert (2011)

Raconte-moi... is a 2010 album by jazz singer Stacey Kent. This was Kent's first album recorded in the French language and featured mostly songs by French writers as well as songs from the Great American Songbook and Bossa Nova catalogue.

On the Billboard charts Raconte-moi featured in the European Top 100 Albums and the top French Albums and reached 13 on the Jazz Albums chart.

== Reception ==
Michael G. Nastos reviewed the album for AllMusic and wrote that "...Kent here fancies herself as a modern-day Edith Piaf, with a very low-key, late-night, romantic approach. Her thin, wispy voice rides very much under the radar of these selections...Harvey's pristine piano is the telling factor on how this music inspires Kent to dig deep into her soul without pulling in demons or being extroverted. ...it is heartfelt and purely soulful no matter the lyrics or language."

== Track listing ==
1. "Les Eaux de Mars" (Antônio Carlos Jobim, Georges Moustaki) – 3:38
2. "Jardin d'Hiver" (Benjamin Biolay, Keren Ann) – 3:34
3. "Raconte-moi..." (Bernie Beaupère, Jean-Karl Lucas, Emilie Satt) – 3:42
4. "L'Étang" (Paul Misraki) – 4:24
5. "La Vénus du Mélo" (Bernie Beaupère, Jean-Karl Lucas, Emilie Satt) – 3:47
6. "Au Coin du Monde" (Benjamin Biolay, Keren Ann) – 4:14
7. "C'est le Printemps" (Oscar Hammerstein II, Richard Rodgers, Jean Sablon) – 4:28
8. "Sait-on Jamais?" (Camille Davila, Jim Tomlinson) – 4:12
9. "Les Vacances au Bord de la Mer" (Pierre Grosz, Michel Jonasz) – 3:29
10. "Mi Amor" (Claire Denamur) – 3:58
11. "Le Mal de Vivre" (Barbara) – 4:44
12. "Désuets" (Pierre-Dominique Burgaud, André Manoukian) – 3:09

== Personnel ==
- Stacey Kent – vocals, whistling
- Jim Tomlinson – soprano saxophone, tenor saxophone, baritone saxophone, clarinet, kalimba [Sansula]
- Graham Harvey – piano
- John Parricelli – guitar
- Jeremy Brown – bass
- Matt Skelton – drums, percussion

== Charts ==
=== Weekly charts ===
Weekly chart performance
Chart (2010)	Peak position
Belgian Albums (Ultratop Wallonia)	37
Canadian Albums (Nielsen SoundScan)	38
French Albums (SNEP)	10
German Albums (Offizielle Top 100)	95
Greek Albums (IFPI)	42
Portuguese Albums (AFP)	18
Spanish Albums (Promusicae)	63
Swiss Albums (Schweizer Hitparade)	65
UK Jazz & Blues Albums (Official Charts)	16
US Top Jazz Albums (Billboard)	13

=== Year-end charts ===
Year-end chart performance
Chart (2010)	Position
French Albums (SNEP)	102

== Certifications ==
Certifications
Region	Certification	Certified units/sales
France (SNEP)	Gold	50,000^{*}
Germany (BVMI)	Gold	10,000^{^}
^{*} Sales figures based on certification alone.^{^} Shipments figures based on certification alone.
