= I Guess I'll Have to Change My Plan =

1929 popular song

Sheet music, 1929

"I Guess I'll Have to Change My Plan" is a popular song published in 1929, with music by Arthur Schwartz and lyrics by Howard Dietz.

== Camp song ==
It originally was a summer camp song titled "I Love to Lie Awake in Bed," with Schwartz's music set to lyrics by Lorenz Hart. Both young men worked at Brant Lake Camp in the Adirondacks; Schwartz as music counselor and Hart as director of the camp's stage productions. The original lyrics were as follows:

I love to lie awake in bed
Right after taps I pull the flaps above my head
And watch the stars upon my pillow
Oh what a light the moonbeams shed
I feel so happy I could cry
And tears are born right in the corner of my eye
To be at home with Ma was never like this
I could live forever like this
I love to lie awake a while
And go to sleep with a smile

== The Little Show ==
The ballad, with new lyrics by Howard Dietz, was introduced by Clifton Webb in the 1929 Broadway revue The Little Show. Dressed in white-tie-and-tails, Webb sang of his stunned disappointment upon learning that the woman he worshipped from afar was married. It was given the subtitle "The Blue Pajama Song" because of a suggestive line in the second refrain: "I guess I'll have to change my plan / I should have realized there'd be another man / Why did I buy those blue pajamas / before the big affair began?" The full song was in five parts—Verse 1, Refrain 1, Refrain 2, Verse 2 and Refrain 3.

== Use in films ==
The song was famously performed by Fred Astaire and Jack Buchanan in the 1953 musical film, The Band Wagon. Dressed in white-tie-and-tails and top hats and leaning on canes, the men sang in unison as if they were competing suitors both rejected by the same woman. They sang the song's first refrain and a sanitized second refrain, and then danced to an instrumental refrain.

The tune was the opening theme and used repeatedly in the 1932 William Powell film Lawyer Man. It was used as incidental music in the 1946 film The Big Sleep

Under the musical direction of Ray Heindorf, brief fragments of the tune can be heard in the background music score for the Joan Crawford film 'Goodbye My Fancy', with a slow, almost complete, version played about 40-minutes from the beginning. The song was sung by Marsha Mason and Kristy McNichol in the 1981 Neil Simon comedy-drama film Only When I Laugh (the motion picture version of Simon's Broadway play The Gingerbread Lady).

== Recordings ==
The song has become a pop standard, recorded by many artists:

- Rudy Vallee and his Connecticut Yankees – this was a major hit in 1932.
- Guy Lombardo and his Royal Canadians – recorded August 17, 1932 for Brunswick Records (catalog 6363). This also reached the charts of the day.
- Layton & Johnstone (1933).
- Ambrose and his orchestra (1933).
- Bing Crosby recorded the song in 1954 for use on his radio show and it was subsequently included in the box set The Bing Crosby CBS Radio Recordings (1954–56) issued by Mosaic Records (catalog MD7-245) in 2009.
- Lester Young – The Jazz Giants '56 (1956).
- Jaye P. Morgan – included in her album Jaye P. Morgan (1956).
- Frank Sinatra – A Swingin' Affair! (1957).
- Julie London – Julie Is Her Name, Volume II (she sings about "black pajamas") (1958).
- Patti Page – for her album Patti Page – The West Side (1958).
- Tony Bennett – Basie Swings, Bennett Sings (1959).
- Anthony Newley – included in his album Love Is a Now and Then Thing (1960).
- Bobby Darin – recorded for his album Love Swings (1961).
- Kay Starr – for her album Back to the Roots (1975).
- Stacey Kent – Let Yourself Go: Celebrating Fred Astaire (2000).
- Seth MacFarlane – No One Ever Tells You (2015).
- Bob Dylan – Triplicate (2017).
