= Bold as Brass =

Bold as Brass may refer to:

- A phrase, meaning very bold or impudent, popularly said to have originated in reference to Brass Crosby
- Bold as Brass (album), a 2010 studio album by Cliff Richard
- "Bold as Brass" (song), a single recorded by Split Enz for the 1977 album Dizrythmia
