= How Insensitive =

"Insensatez"

Song by Antônio Carlos Jobim

from the album The Composer of Desafinado, Plays
- Language: Portuguese
- English title: "How Insensitive"
- Released: 1963
- Genre: Bossa nova
- Length: 2:53
- Label: Verve
- Composer: Antônio Carlos Jobim
- Lyricists: Vinícius de Moraes; Norman Gimbel (English lyrics)
- Producer: Creed Taylor

The Composer of Desafinado, Plays track listing
- 12 tracks: 1. "The Girl from Ipanema"; 2. "O Amor em Paz"; 3. "Agua de Beber"; 4. "Vivo Sonhando"; 5. "O Morro Não Tem Vez"; 6. "Insensatez"; 7. "Corcovado"; 8. "One Note Samba"; 9. "Meditação"; 10. "Só Danço Samba"; 11. "Chega de Saudade"; 12. "Desafinado"

"How Insensitive" (Portuguese: Insensatez) is a bossa nova and jazz standard song composed by Brazilian musician Antônio Carlos Jobim. The original lyrics are by Vinícius de Moraes (in Portuguese); an English version was written by Norman Gimbel. Jobim recorded the song in 1994 with Sting on lead vocals for his last studio album Antônio Brasileiro.

== Background ==
In Brazil the song goes by the title "Insensatez", which translates more accurately to "Foolishness". The beginning of the song resembles Chopin's prelude in E minor.

== Recorded versions ==
The song has been performed and recorded often by a diverse group of singers, such as:

- Frank Sinatra and Antônio Carlos Jobim on their 1967 album Francis Albert Sinatra & Antonio Carlos Jobim
- Peggy Lee on her 1964 album In Love Again!
- Andy Williams on his 1966 album The Shadow of Your Smile
- Vic Damone on his 1966 album Stay with Me
- Nancy Wilson on her 1968 album Easy
- Shirley Bassey on her 1979 album The Magic Is You
- Olivia Newton-John on her 2004 release Indigo: Women of Song
- Petula Clark on her 1967 album These Are My Songs
- William Shatner as part of a medley on his 1968 The Transformed Man
- Iggy Pop on his 2009 release Préliminaires
- Sinéad O'Connor on her 1992 album Am I Not Your Girl?
- Robert Wyatt on his 2003 release Cuckooland
- Pat MacDonald on his 2004 album In the Red Room

Musicians who covered the composition in the jazz genre:

- Joao Gilberto
- Laurindo Almeida
- Stan Getz & Luiz Bonfá on their 1963 album Jazz Samba Encore!
- Wes Montgomery on his 1966 album Tequila
- Sergio Mendes on his 1967 album Quiet Nights
- Stacey Kent on her 2013 album The Changing Lights
- George Shearing on his 1985 album Grand Piano
- Diana Krall on her 2006 album From This Moment On
- Pat Martino on his 1972 album The Visit
- Pat Metheny
- Larry Coryell and Emily Remler on their 1985 album Together
- Roy Hargrove on his 2000 release Moment to Moment

== See also ==
- Jazz standard
