= The Best Is Yet to Come =

Original song composed by Cy Coleman with words by Carolyn Leigh

Song
- Published: 1959 by Edwin H. Morris & Co.
- Genre: Jazz
- Composer: Cy Coleman
- Lyricist: Carolyn Leigh

"The Best Is Yet to Come"

Song by Frank Sinatra

from the album It Might as Well Be Swing
- Released: August 1964
- Recorded: June 9, 1964
- Genre: Jazz; traditional pop; swing
- Length: 3:10
- Label: Reprise
- Composer: Cy Coleman
- Lyricist: Carolyn Leigh
- Producer: Sonny Burke

Frank Sinatra singles chronology
"I Wanna Be Around" (1964)	"The Best Is Yet to Come" (1964)	"The Good Life" (1964)

"The Best Is Yet to Come" is a 1959 song composed by Cy Coleman to lyrics by Carolyn Leigh. It is associated with Frank Sinatra, who recorded it on his 1964 album It Might as Well Be Swing accompanied by Count Basie under the direction of Quincy Jones. It was the last song Sinatra sang in public, on February 25, 1995, and the words "The Best is Yet to Come" were etched on Sinatra's original tombstone until it was replaced in 2020 (for reasons never officially explained by the Sinatra family) with a new stone that reads "Sleep Warm, Poppa". Although Sinatra made it popular, the song was written for and introduced by Tony Bennett.

Before it was recorded by Sinatra, the song's debut was sung and played by Cy Coleman on Hugh Hefner's Playboy's Penthouse variety show.

== Notable recordings ==
- Tony Bennett (I Left My Heart in San Francisco) (1962)
- Tony Bennett and Diana Krall (Duets: An American Classic) (2006)
- Tony Bennett and Diana Krall in Tony Bennett: An American Classic. Documentary directed by Rob Marshall (2006)
- Michael Bublé (Call Me Irresponsible) (2007)
- James Darren (This One's from the Heart) (1999)
- Blossom Dearie (May I Come In?) (1964)
- Matt Dusk (Back in Town) (2006)
- Bob Dylan (Triplicate) (2017)
- Ella Fitzgerald (The Best Is Yet to Come) (1982)
- Stacey Kent (The Boy Next Door) (2003)
- Chaka Khan (ClassiKhan) (2004)
- Peggy Lee (Sugar 'N' Spice) (1962)
- Diane Schuur (In Tribute) (1992)
- Frank Sinatra (It Might As Well Be Swing) (1964)
- Lisa Stansfield (Swing: Original Motion Picture Soundtrack) (1999)
- Nancy Wilson (Yesterday's Love Songs/Today's Blues) (1963)
- Bobby Caldwell - Come Rain or Come Shine (1999)
- Sarah Vaughan (You're Mine You) (1962)

== In popular culture ==
- In February 1999, James Darren and Avery Brooks sang the song in the final scene of "Badda-Bing Badda-Bang", a seventh-season episode of the syndicated science fiction television series Star Trek: Deep Space Nine.
- The song was played as a wake-up call for the crew of Apollo 10 on May 22, 1969. The historic day marked the first time that the Lunar Module flew solo in lunar orbit as it made man's closest approach to the lunar surface to date.
