= Tony Dudley-Evans =

British jazz promoter

Tony Dudley-Evans is Jazz Adviser to the Jazzlines programme at Town Hall/Symphony Hall Birmingham and Programme Adviser to the Cheltenham Jazz Festival.

He now sees himself as a jazz promoter, but he was for many years a British linguist and expert in English for Specific Purposes. One of the most influential authors in the development of the modern notion of genre, he is usually grouped together with John Swales and Vijay Bhatia as the driving force behind recent developments in ESP.

Tony Dudley-Evans was educated at King Edward's School, Birmingham. Having gained a BA in Arabic (University of London), a PGCE in teaching English as a Foreign Language (University of Wales) and an MA in Applied English Linguistic (University of Birmingham), Tony pursued a career as a researcher and lecturer until his retirement in 2001. Among his best-known books are Developments in English for Specific Purposes, authored with Maggie Jo St John, and The Language of Economics, co-edited with economist Willie Henderson.

Despite the demands of his 'day-job', he was from 1985, chair of Birmingham Jazz, an organisation which promoted up to 100 concerts a year at Symphony Hall, the CBSO Centre, the Adrian Boult Hall, mac, The Drum, the Fiddle and Bone and the Glee Club. In Birmingham alone he has promoted around 1000 jazz events since 1985. A popular promotion is the weekly free Friday evening session, now known as the Jazzlines Free Gigs, held in Symphony Hall Café Bar showcasing emerging and established jazz musicians to regular audiences of hundreds.

In 2012 the work of Birmingham Jazz was transferred to Jazzlines, Town Hall and Symphony Hall's dynamic programme of live jazz performances and education projects across the city. Tony became Jazz Adviser and works closely with Jazzlines Programme Manager, Mary Wakelam-Sloan. Jazzlines is now the major jazz promoter in Birmingham and a key national jazz organisation.

As a promoter Tony has commissioned composers including Mike Gibbs, Tim Berne, Julian Joseph, Iain Ballamy, Tom Bancroft, Barbara Thompson, Billy Jenkins, Mark-Anthony Turnage, Liam Noble, Hans Koller, Ingrid Laubrock and many more. He received one of the BBC Jazz Awards in 2005 for services to jazz. He is also an honorary Fellow of the Birmingham Conservatoire.

Tony has been involved with the Cheltenham Jazz Festival since its beginnings 20 years ago, initially as Chair of the Jazz Advisory Group, then as artistic director and, finally, for the last three years as Programme Advisor, working closely with Ian George, Director, and firstly Philip Woods and for the last two years Emily Jones as Jazz Managers. This programming team has built Cheltenham Jazz Festival up into one of the leading jazz festivals in Europe.

Tony has also supported the Birmingham Conservatoire's BMus Jazz course and has until recently co-ordinated the Performance Platform class for third year and final-year students. Tony has also been a member of the Arts Council's Music Panel and was on the Board of both Birmingham Arts Marketing and JazzDev. He is now a member of Jazz Services Touring Panel and is widely consulted about jazz promotion.

He is married to Maggie Jo St. John, and has two grown up children, Stephanie and Adrian. He supports West Bromwich Albion F.C. and Leeds Rhinos.
