= The Changing Lights =

2013 album by Stacey Kent

Studio album by Stacey Kent
- Released: 2013
- Recorded: November 2012 and April 2013
- Studio: Curtis Schwartz Studios

Stacey Kent chronology
Dreamer In Concert (2011)	The Changing Lights (2013)	Tenderly (2015)

The Changing Lights is a 2013 album by Stacey Kent.

== Track listing ==
1. "This Happy Madness" (Antônio Carlos Jobim, Vinicius de Moraes, Gene Lees) – 5:37
2. "The Summer We Crossed Europe In The Rain" (Kazuo Ishiguro, Jim Tomlinson) – 5:31
3. "One Note Samba" (Antônio Carlos Jobim, Newton Mendonça) – 3:02
4. "Mais Uma Vez" (António Ladeira, Jim Tomlinson) – 5:54
5. "Waiter, Oh Waiter" (Kazuo Ishiguro, Jim Tomlinson) – 5:08
6. "O Barquinho" (Ronaldo Bôscoli, Roberto Menescal) – 3:06
7. "The Changing Lights" (Kazuo Ishiguro, Jim Tomlinson) – 6:18
8. "How Insensitive" (Antônio Carlos Jobim, Vinicius de Moraes, Norman Gimbel) – 4:03
9. "O Bêbado E A Equilibrista / Smile" (Aldir Blanc, João Bosco / Charles Chaplin, Geoffrey Parsons, John Turner – 4:24
10. "Like A Lover" (Nelson Motta, Dori Caymmi, Alan and Marilyn Bergman) – 3:37
11. "The Face I Love" (Marcos Valle, Paulo Sérgio Valle, Carlos Pingarilho, Ray Gilbert) – 4:07
12. "A Tarde" (António Ladeira, Jim Tomlinson) – 2:52
13. "Chanson Légère" (António Ladeira, Jim Tomlinson) – 4:04

== Personnel ==
Performance

- Stacey Kent – vocals, guitar
- Jim Tomlinson – tenor sax, soprano sax & flute
- Graham Harvey – piano
- Roberto Menescal -guitar
- John Parricelli – guitar
- Jeremy Brown – guitar
- Matt Home – drums
- Joshua Morrison – drums
- Raymundo Bittencourt – ganzá

Recorded November 2012 and April 2013 at the Curtis Schwartz Studios, Ardingley, Sussex, UK

== Charts ==
=== Weekly charts ===
Chart (2013)	Peak position
Belgian Albums (Ultratop Flanders)	72
Belgian Albums (Ultratop Wallonia)	26
French Albums (SNEP)	16
Portuguese Albums (AFP)	2
Swiss Albums (Schweizer Hitparade)	98
US Top Jazz Albums (Billboard)	49

=== Year-end charts ===
Chart (2013)	Position
French Albums (SNEP)	181
