= BBC Jazz Awards =

Former British music awards

- Awarded for: Jazz music
- Venue: Various
- Country: United Kingdom
- First award: 2001; 25 years ago
- Final award: 2011; 15 years ago (as The British Jazz Awards)
- Website: Official website

Television/radio coverage
- Network: BBC Radio 2 and BBC Radio 3

The BBC Jazz Awards were set up in 2001 and had the status of one of the premier jazz awards in the United Kingdom (among those presenting the awards were Denis Lawson, Sue Mingus, Humphrey Lyttelton, Ian Carr, Clive James, Mike Gibbs, Julian Joseph, Moira Stuart, Annie Whitehead, Mark Knopfler, Dave Brubeck, and Kenneth Clarke). There were awards for Best Musician, Best Vocalist, Rising Star, Best Album, Jazz Innovation, Radio 2 Jazz Artist, Services to Jazz, Best of Jazz and others.

Programmes linked to the awards were broadcast on both Radio 2 and Radio 3. In March 2009, the BBC announced that the Jazz Awards were closed. It briefly returned in 2011 as The British Jazz Awards but has not been held since.

== Winners ==
=== 2001 ===
The winners were:

- Best Band: Courtney Pine Band
- Rising Star: Alex Wilson
- Best Instrumental: Alan Barnes
- Best Vocalist: Norma Winstone
- Best Album: Jean Toussaint's Nazaire - Street Above The Underground
- Best New Work: Chris Batchelor
- Jazz Innovation: Iain Ballamy
- Services to Jazz: Pete King (Ronnie Scott's)
- International Award: Clark Terry
- Lifetime Achievement: Humphrey Lyttelton

=== 2002 ===
The winners were:

- Best Album: Brian Kellock Trio Live At Henry's
- Best Band: Jazz Jamaica All Stars
- Best Vocalist: Stacey Kent
- Best Instrumentalist: John Surman
- Rising Star: Soweto Kinch
- Best New Work: John Taylor, Green Man Suite
- Jazz Innovation: Matt Bourne
- Services to Jazz: Chris Hodgkins
- International Award of the Year: Hugh Masekela
- Jazz Heritage Award: Chris Barber
- Lifetime Achievement 1: Cleo Laine & John Dankworth
- Lifetime Achievement 2: Stan Tracey

=== 2003 ===
The winners were:

- Best Band: Guy Barker's International Septet
- International Artist: Esbjorn Svensson Trio
- Lifetime Achievement: George Shearing
- Best CD: Exile by Gilad Atzmon's Orient House Ensemble
- Best Vocalist: Claire Martin
- Rising Star: Jamie Cullum
- Jazz Heritage Award: The Merseysippi Jazz Band
- Best Instrumentalist: Brian Kellock
- Best New Work: Interrupting Cutler by Brian Irvine
- Jazz Innovation: Byron Wallen
- Services to Jazz: Tony Dudley-Evans

=== 2004 ===
The winners were:

- Best Album: The Journey Home by Colin Steele
- Best Band: Soweto Kinch
- Best Vocalist: Ian Shaw
- Best Instrumentalist: Soweto Kinch
- Rising Star: Seb Rochford
- Best New Work: Cheltenham "Jerwood Rising Stars" Commission - Richard Fairhurst
- Jazz Innovation: F-IRE Collective
- Services to Jazz: Jed Williams
- International Award of the Year: Wynton Marsalis
- Jazz Heritage Award: Keith Nichols
- Lifetime Achievement: George Melly

=== 2005 ===
The winners were:

- Album of the Year: All Is Know by Tony Kofi
- Best Band: Acoustic Ladyland
- Best Vocalist: Liane Carroll
- Best Instrumentalist: Peter King
- Rising Star: Gwilym Simcock
- Artist of the Year: Jamie Cullum
- Services to Jazz: John Cumming
- Lifetime Achievement: Oscar Peterson
- Innovation Award: Huw Warren
- Best of Jazz: Liane Carroll
- Gold Award: Acker Bilk

=== 2006 ===
The winners were:

- Album of the Year: The Lyric by Jim Tomlinson
- Best of Jazz: Anita Wardell
- Radio 2 Jazz Artist of the Year: Jools Holland
- Radio 3 Jazz Line-Up award for Best Band: Dennis Rollins' Badbone and Co
- Radio 3 Jazz on 3 award for Innovation or Achievement in New Music: Tim Garland's Lighthouse Project
- Rising Star: Andrew McCormack
- Best Instrumentalist: Alan Barnes
- Best Vocalist: Clare Teal
- Services to Jazz in the UK: Ian Carr
- Lifetime Achievement: Quincy Jones

=== 2007 ===
The winners were:

- Album of the Year: Displaced by Neil Cowley Trio
- Best Band: Finn Peters' Finntet
- Best Vocalist: Ian Shaw
- Best Instrumentalist: Julian Siegel
- Rising Star: Simon Spillett
- Artist of the Year: Curtis Stigers
- International Artist: Madeleine Peyroux
- Services to Jazz: Gary Crosby
- Lifetime Achievement: Dave Brubeck
- Innovation Award: Tom Bancroft
- Heart of Jazz: Martin Taylor

=== 2008 ===
The winners were:

- Album of the Year: All is Yes by The Blessing
- Best Band: Tom Cawley's Curios
- Best Vocalist:Christine Tobin
- Best Instrumentalist: Tony Kofi
- Rising Star: Kit Downes
- Artist of the Year: Humphrey Lyttelton
- International Artist: Charlie Haden
- Services to Jazz: Alan Bates
- Lifetime Achievement: Return to Forever
- Innovation Award: Fraud
- Heart of Jazz: Tommy Smith
- Gold Award: Cleo Laine and John Dankworth

=== 2011 ===
The winners were:

- Album of the Year: Exile by Gilad Atzmon's Orient House Ensemble
- Best Band: Guy Barker's International Septet
- Best Vocalist: Claire Martin
- Best Instrumentalist: Brian Kellock
- Rising Star: Jamie Cullum
- International Artist: Esbjörn Svensson Trio
- Services to Jazz: Tony Dudley-Evans
- Lifetime Achievement: George Shearing
- Innovation Award: Byron Wallen
- Jazz Heritage: The Merseysippi Jazz Band
- Best New Work: Interrupting Cutler, Brian Irvine
