= Breakfast on the Morning Tram =

2007 album by Stacy Kent

Studio album by Stacey Kent
- Released: 2007
- Genre: Jazz
- Label: Blue Note

Stacey Kent chronology
The Lyric (2006)	Breakfast on the Morning Tram (2007)	Raconte-moi... (2010)

Professional ratings
Review scores
Source	Rating
The Penguin Guide to Jazz Recordings	3/4 stars
The Guardian	3/5 stars

Breakfast on the Morning Tram is an album by American jazz singer Stacey Kent that was nominated for the Grammy Award for Best Jazz Vocal Album in 2009. It was her first album for Blue Note Records. The album features four songs with lyrics written by novelist Kazuo Ishiguro.

== Track listing ==
No.	Title	Writer(s)	Length
1.	"The Ice Hotel"	Jim Tomlinson, Kazuo Ishiguro
2.	"Landslide"	Stevie Nicks
3.	"Ces Petits Riens"	Serge Gainsbourg
4.	"I Wish I Could Go Travelling Again"	Tomlinson/Ishiguro
5.	"So Many Stars"	Sérgio Mendes, Alan Bergman, Marilyn Bergman
6.	"Samba Saravah"	Baden Powell, Vinicius de Moraes, Pierre Barouh
7.	"Breakfast on the Morning Tram"	Tomlinson/Ishiguro
8.	"Never Let Me Go"	Jay Livingston, Ray Evans
9.	"So Romantic"	Tomlinson/Ishiguro
10.	"Hard Hearted Hannah"	Milton Ager, Jack Yellen, Bob Bigelow, Charles Bates
11.	"La Saison des Pluies"	Serge Gainsbourg, Elek Bacsik
12.	"What a Wonderful World"	Bob Thiele, George David Weiss

== Musicians ==
- Stacey Kent – vocals
- Jim Tomlinson – tenor sax, alto sax, soprano sax, flute
- Graham Harvey – piano, Fender Rhodes
- John Parricelli – guitar
- Dave Chamberlain – bass
- Matt Skelton – drums, percussion

== Charts ==
=== Weekly charts ===
Weekly chart performance
Chart (2007)	Peak position
Belgian Albums (Ultratop Flanders)	68
Belgian Albums (Ultratop Wallonia)	80
Canadian Albums (Nielsen SoundScan)	62
French Albums (SNEP)	11
Polish Albums (ZPAV)	43
UK Jazz & Blues Albums (Official Charts)	8
US Top Jazz Albums (Billboard)	21

=== Year-end charts ===
2007 year-end chart performance
Chart (2007)	Position
French Albums (SNEP)	72

2008 year-end chart performance
Chart (2008)	Position
French Albums (SNEP)	107

== Certifications ==
Certifications
Region	Certification	Certified units/sales
France (SNEP)	Platinum	100,000^{*}
Germany (BVMI)	3× Gold	30,000^{^}
^{*} Sales figures based on certification alone.^{^} Shipments figures based on certification alone.
