= Lisa Casalino =

American singer (born 1972)

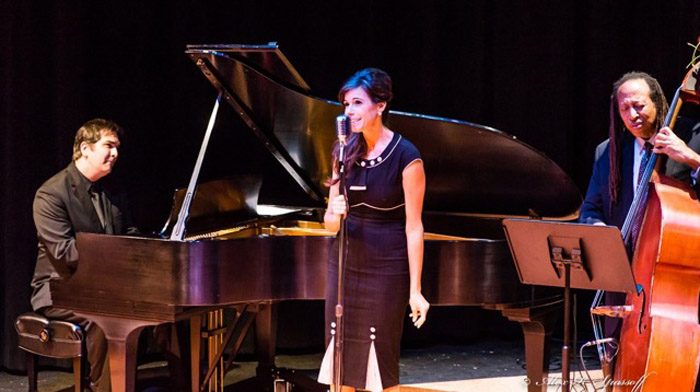
- Casalino at the Ybor Jazz Festival, Tampa, Florida, 2012

Background information
- Born: Lisa Anna Hertzner; August 21, 1972 (age 54); Long Island, New York, U.S.
- Genre: Jazz
- Occupation: Singer
- Website: lisacasalino.com

Lisa A. Hertzner (born August 21, 1972), known professionally as Lisa Casalino, is an American jazz singer and songwriter.

== Early life and education ==
Born in Long Island, New York, Casalino expressed interest in music as a child, learning both hands on and scholastically. In addition to vocals she is versed in multiple instruments, notably keyboards and acoustic guitar. After high school graduation, earning a Regents diploma with Honors from Johnsburg Central, class of 1990, she studied music education and underwent classical vocal training at the Crane School of Music (SUNY at Potsdam), receiving bachelor's and master's degrees in 1994 and 1995, respectively. Soon after college she accepted a position at Hillsborough County Public Schools in Florida as a music instructor and choral director at Durant High School. She moved to Tampa and began to develop the music program, which included writing the school's song.

== Career ==
In 2004, she left education to pursue a full-time singing career.

Over the next several years Casalino gained popularity throughout Tampa Bay and central Florida while working on a music style that incorporated jazz standards and her compositions. She began performing more frequently at larger events such as jazz festivals, fundraisers, and football and baseball games.

Casalino has performed on television, including multiple live performances on CBS affiliate WTSP Studio 10. She has also appeared on NBC affiliates WFLA Daytime, and WTVJ "6 in the Mix," the later being based in Miami.

In 2011, she released her debut album, Introducing Lisa Casalino, which was recorded at NOLA Studios in New York City with jazz musicians Harry Allen, Nate Najar, Chuck Redd, Jon-Erik Kellso, and Rossano Sportiello. A video for her song "The Good Stuff" was featured at the Gasparilla Film Festival in 2013. Also in 2013, she was the opening act for Joey Dee at The Festa Italiana, for Chicago at The Clearwater Jazz Holiday, and she performed on the HSN televised special A Mary Christmas with Mary J. Blige and David Foster.

To support the release of her second album, I'm Old Fashioned (2014), she performed a sold-out concert at the Palladium Theater in St. Petersburg, Florida. The album featured Kenny Drew Jr., Nate Najar, Jeff Rupert, and John Lamb. Her recordings have been featured on Music Choice, Satellite TV, Pandora, and worldwide jazz radio.

== Discography ==
Year	Album/Work
2011	"Never Looking Back" (Film) Duplicitous Behavior
2011	Introducing Lisa Casalino
2012	Christmas Is Still Christmas
2014	I'm Old Fashioned
