= In Love Again: The Music of Richard Rodgers =

Studio album by Stacey Kent
- Released: 2002
- Recorded: 2002
- Genre: Vocal jazz
- Length: 53:49
- Label: Candid
- Producer: Jim Tomlinson

Stacey Kent chronology
Dreamsville (2001)	In Love Again: The Music of Richard Rodgers (2002)	The Boy Next Door (2003)

In Love Again: The Music of Richard Rodgers is a 2002 studio album by Stacey Kent, of the songs of the American composer Richard Rodgers.

== Reception ==
Professional ratings
Review scores
Source	Rating
Allmusic	3/5 stars
The Penguin Guide to Jazz Recordings	3/4 stars

David R. Adler writing on Allmusic.com gave the album three stars out of five. Adler said the "burlesque-ish 6/8 middle section" of "I'm Gonna Wash That Man Right Outa My Hair" works "amazingly well". He went on to say: "The sound of the disc is strong, highlighting the nicely varied arrangements and the innate charm of Kent's puckish voice." However, he criticized an "aimless bossa nova reading of 'It Might as Well Be Spring,' and a general overabundance of ballads".

== Track listing ==
1. "Shall We Dance?" (Oscar Hammerstein II) – 3:42
2. "Bewitched, Bothered and Bewildered" (Lorenz Hart) – 5:05
3. "My Heart Stood Still" (Hart) – 2:57
4. "It Never Entered My Mind" (Hart) – 4:39
5. "I Wish I Were in Love Again" (Hart) – 4:06
6. "Thou Swell" (Hart) – 4:52
7. "It Might as Well Be Spring" (Hammerstein) – 4:39
8. "Nobody's Heart (Belongs to Me)" (Hart) – 3:48
9. "I'm Gonna Wash That Man Right Outta My Hair" (Hammerstein) – 4:35
10. "This Can't Be Love" (Hart) – 3:07
11. "Easy to Remember" (Hart) – 4:57
12. "Manhattan" (Hart) – 4:22
13. "Bali Ha'i" (Hammerstein) – 3:00

All music composed by Richard Rodgers, lyricists indicated.

== Personnel ==
Performance

- Stacey Kent – vocals, arranger
- Jim Tomlinson – flute, tenor saxophone, arranger, producer
- David Newton – piano
- Colin Oxley – guitar
- Simon Thorpe – double bass
- Jesper Kviberg – drums

Production

- Curtis Schwartz – engineer, mixing
- Alan Bates – executive producer, liner notes
- Mental Block – design
- Kate Messer – make-up
