= Let Yourself Go: Celebrating Fred Astaire =

Studio album by Stacey Kent
- Released: March 28, 2000
- Recorded: 2000
- Genre: Vocal jazz
- Length: 54:41
- Label: Candid
- Producer: Jim Tomlinson

Stacey Kent chronology
Love Is...The Tender Trap (1999)	Let Yourself Go: Celebrating Fred Astaire (2000)	Dreamsville (2001)

Let Yourself Go: Celebrating Fred Astaire is a 2000 studio album by Stacey Kent.

This was Kent's third studio album, and was recorded in tribute to the dancer and singer Fred Astaire, who introduced many of the songs on this album.

== Reception ==
Professional ratings
Review scores
Source	Rating
Allmusic	3/5 stars
The Penguin Guide to Jazz Recordings	3.5/4 stars

Dave Nathan, writing on Allmusic.com gave the album three stars out of five. Nathan said that it was "another excellent album" by Kent and it was "happily recommended". Nathan praised Kent's interplay with pianist David Newton on "Isn't This a Lovely Day" and "They Can't Take That Away From Me", and guitarist Colin Oxley on "A Fine Romance". David Adler in All About Jazz wrote that Jim Tomlinson's tenor saxophone breaks on "He Loves and She Loves" are "exquisite". He praised Kent's delivery as "charming and infectious...She pours her heart out on two devastatingly sad numbers, "By Myself" and "I Guess I'll Have to Change My Plan"".

== Track listing ==
1. "Let Yourself Go" (Irving Berlin) – 3:48
2. "They Can't Take That Away from Me" (George Gershwin, Ira Gershwin) – 5:09
3. "I Won't Dance" (Dorothy Fields, Otto Harbach, Oscar Hammerstein II, Jerome Kern, Jimmy McHugh) – 4:37
4. "Isn't This a Lovely Day?" (Berlin) – 3:58
5. "They All Laughed" (G. Gershwin, I. Gershwin) – 4:31
6. "He Loves and She Loves" (G. Gershwin, I. Gershwin) – 4:26
7. "Shall We Dance?" (G. Gershwin, I. Gershwin) – 3:03
8. "One for My Baby (and One More for the Road)" (Harold Arlen, Johnny Mercer) – 5:57
9. "'S Wonderful" (G. Gershwin, I Gershwin) – 6:01
10. "A Fine Romance" (Fields, Kern) – 3:02
11. "I Guess I'll Have to Change My Plan" (Howard Dietz, Arthur Schwartz) – 2:37
12. "I'm Putting All My Eggs in One Basket" (Berlin) – 3:44
13. "By Myself" (Dietz, Schwartz) – 3:48

== Personnel ==
Performance

- Stacey Kent – vocals, arranger
- Jim Tomlinson – clarinet, alto saxophone, tenor saxophone, arranger, producer
- David Newton – piano
- Colin Oxley – guitar
- Simon Thorpe – double bass
- Steve Brown – drums
- Simon Woolf – arranger

Production

- Curtis Schwartz – engineer, mixing
- Alan Bates – executive producer
- Paul Rider – photography
