= Close Your Eyes (Stacey Kent album) =

Studio album by Stacey Kent
- Released: September 16, 1997
- Recorded: November 18–19, 1996
- Genre: Vocal jazz
- Length: 53:21
- Label: Candid (UK)/Koch International (USA)
- Producer: Alan Bates

Stacey Kent chronology
Close Your Eyes (1997)	Love Is...The Tender Trap (1999)

Close Your Eyes is jazz singer Stacey Kent's debut album, released in 1997 by Candid Records.

It was produced by Alan Bates and features her husband, tenor saxophonist Jim Tomlinson. Kent celebrated the release of Close your Eyes with a performance at the Birdland jazz club in New York City in September 1997. Close Your Eyes was the best-selling British jazz album of 1997.

In an interview with Billboard to promote the album Kent said: "With this album, I was trying to give a mixture of things that people know and gems that got lost, songs that might get missed out of the great standard repertoire."

== Reception ==
Professional ratings
Review scores
Source	Rating
AllMusic	3/5 stars
The Penguin Guide to Jazz Recordings	3/4 stars

Scott Yanow, writing on AllMusic, said: "Stacey Kent has a very appealing voice, and her delivery is full of joy, enthusiasm, and subtle creativity....Jim Tomlinson contributes some tenor solos reminiscent in tone of Stan Getz, and pianist David Newton and guitarist Colin Oxley also get some solo space." Yanow concluded by calling Kent "a voice to look for in the future".

== Track listing ==
1. "More Than You Know" (Edward Eliscu, Billy Rose, Vincent Youmans) - 5:30
2. "Dream Dancing" (Cole Porter) - 4:21
3. "Close Your Eyes" (Bernice Petkere) - 5:19
4. "There's a Lull in My Life" (Mack Gordon, Harry Revel) - 4:22
5. "Its Delovely" (Porter) - 3:21
6. "There's No You" (Tom Adair, Hal Hopper) - 6:09
7. "I'm Old Fashioned" (Jerome Kern, Johnny Mercer) - 2:53
8. "You Go to My Head" (J. Fred Coots, Haven Gillespie) - 7:01
9. "Little White Lies" (Walter Donaldson) - 4:10
10. "Sleep Warm" (Alan Bergman, Marilyn Bergman, Lew Spence) - 4:30
11. "Day In - Day Out" (Rube Bloom, Mercer) - 5:45

== Personnel ==
Performance

- Stacey Kent – vocals, arranger
- Jim Tomlinson - tenor saxophone, arranger
- David Newton - piano
- Colin Oxley - guitar, arranger
- Andrew Cleyndert - double bass
- Steve Brown - drums

Production

- Curtis Schwartz - engineer, mixing
- Alan Bates - producer
- Humphrey Lyttelton - liner notes
