= David Newton (pianist) =

Scottish jazz pianist, composer, and educator

- Born: 2 February 1958 (age 68); Glasgow, Scotland
- Genres: Jazz
- Occupations: Musician, composer, arranger, educator
- Instrument: Piano
- Labels: Linn, Candid
- Website: davidnewtonjazzpiano.com

David Newton (born 2 February 1958) is a Scottish jazz pianist, composer, arranger and educator.

== Early life ==
Newton was born in Glasgow on 2 February 1958. He played clarinet, bassoon and piano, and studied piano at Leeds School of Music.

== Later life and career ==
Newton had a trio in Bradford in 1978 and worked in a theatre in Scarborough. He returned to Scotland in the early 1980s. He gained a reputation as an accompanist to visiting American musicians before launching his own solo career. In 1986, he made his recording debut, with Buddy DeFranco. He moved to London the following year, where he worked with Alan Barnes and toured with Martin Taylor's Quartet (including [a] trip to India) from 1989 to 1991. He was vocalist Carol Kidd's musical director in the 1990s. He also accompanied several other singers.

Newton recorded three albums as a leader for Linn Records in the early 1990s: the trio records Eyewitness and Victim of Circumstance, and the solo piano Return Journey. He then moved to Candid Records and recorded another trio album, In Good Company, for them in 1994. He had a solo piano tour the following year and toured with Bud Shank. In addition to leading his own bands of various sizes, he has also done a lot of freelance playing. In the early to mid-2000s, he also recorded for Bright New Day, including one album with an orchestra.

Newton became a fellow of Leeds College of Music in 2003, where he is a principal lecturer in jazz piano.

== Discography ==
=== As leader ===
Year recorded	Title	Label	Personnel/Notes
1990	Eyewitness	Linn	Trio, with Dave Green (bass), Allan Ganley (drums)
1990	Victim of Circumstance	Linn	Trio; most tracks with Alec Dankworth (bass), Clark Tracey (drums); one track with Dave Green (bass), Allan Ganley (drums)
1992	Return Journey	Linn	Solo piano
1994	In Good Company	Candid	Trio, with Dave Green (bass), Allan Ganley (drums)
1995	Twelfth of the Twelfth	Candid	Solo piano
1996	DNA	Candid	With Iain Dixon (tenor sax), Matt Miles (bass), Steve Brown (drums)
1996	Meets Brian Lemon to Play Hoagy Carmichael	Zephyr	Duo, with Brian Lemon (piano)
2000?	Halfway to Dawn	Concord Jazz	Trio, with Matt Miles (bass), Steve Brown (drums)
2002?	Bootleg Eric	ASC	
2003	Pacific Heights	Bright New Day	Trio, with Dave Chamberlain (bass), Colin Oxley (guitar)
2004	Inspired	Bright New Day	Trio, with Matt Miles (bass), Steve Brown (drums)
2006	Portrait of a Woman	Bright New Day	With Jim Mullen (guitar), Andrew Cleyndert (bass), Steve Brown (drums), orchestra
2011?	Inside Out	Woodville	
2013?	Out of This World		Trio, with Andrew Cleyndert (bass), Colin Oxley (guitar)

=== As sideman ===
With Stacey Kent

- 1997: Close Your Eyes (Candid)
- 1999: Love Is...The Tender Trap (Candid)
- 2000: Let Yourself Go: Celebrating Fred Astaire (Candid)
- 2001: Dreamsville (Candid)
- 2002: In Love Again: The Music of Richard Rodgers (Candid)
- 2003: The Boy Next Door (Candid)

With Ray Gelato and Claire Martin

- 2016: We've Got a World That Swings (Linn)
