= Alex Wilson (musician) =

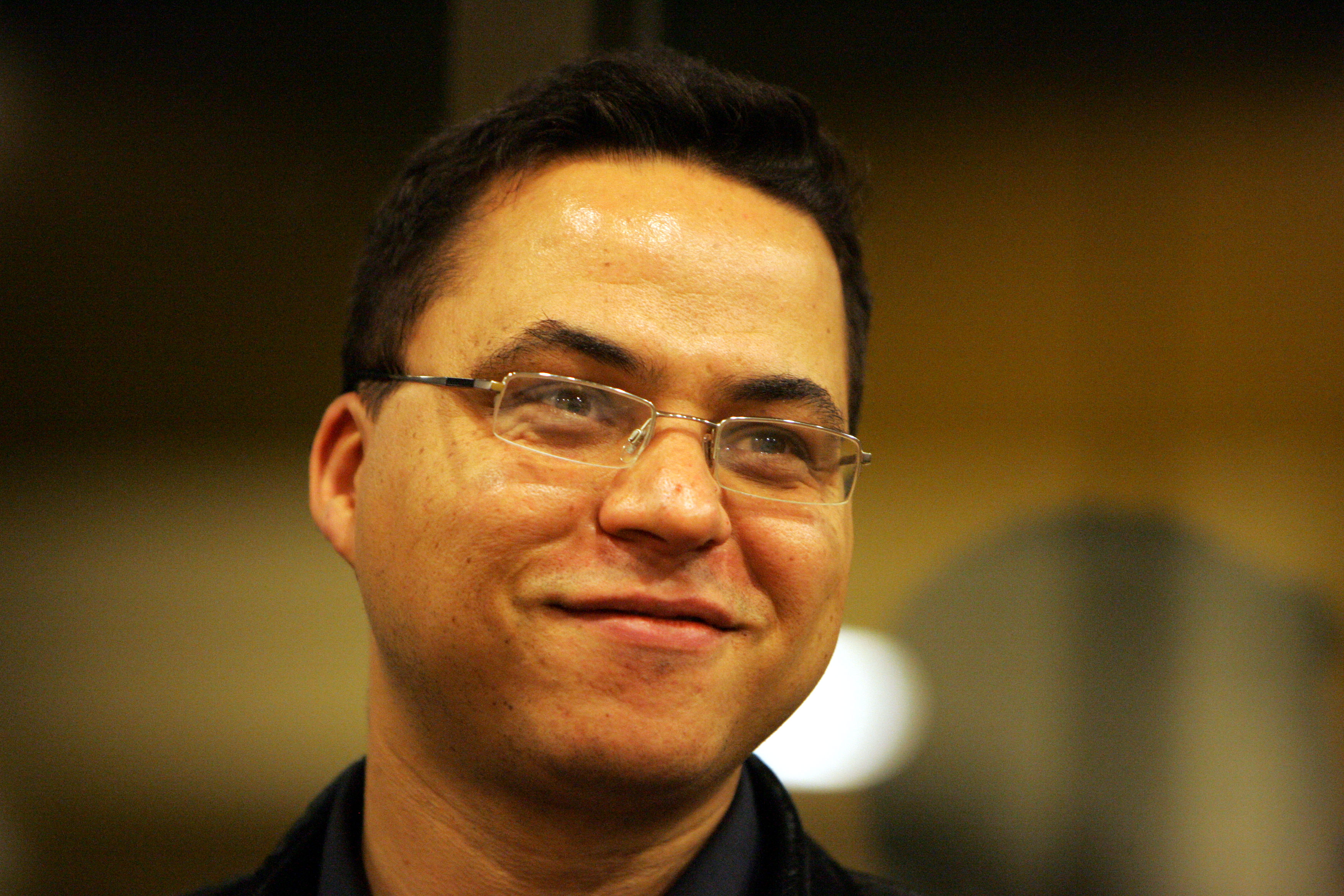
Alex Wilson

Alex Wilson (born 21 November 1971) is a British pianist, composer, producer, arranger, and educator.

== Biography ==
Alex Wilson was born in the UK and was brought up in Sierra Leone, UK, Austria and Switzerland.

In 1993, after gaining a degree in electronics from the University of York, he embarked on a professional career as a pianist, performing and recording with Courtney Pine, Jazz Jamaica, Sandra Cross, Adalberto Santiago and Jocelyn Brown, Wynton Marsalis, Hugh Masakela & Ernest Ranglin quickly being signed to the Candid label. He won the Rising Star award at the 2001 BBC Jazz Awards.

To date, he has released eight solo albums in a Latin Jazz and salsa vein; he also composes commissions, produces Latin hip hop, runs a 12-piece salsa band, works as a session keyboard player and works in educational institutions. His commissions include NITRO (a British black theatre company), the Royal Opera House, the Royal Northern College of Music, and several library music companies. He also works with in schools in London such as Essex Primary School.

Wilson is Special Lecturer in the Department of Music at University of Nottingham.

In 2011, Wilson was invited to be pianist, arranger and musical director for guitar duo Rodrigo y Gabriela on their album Area 52 which was recorded in Havana, Cuba, with C.U.B.A., a 13-piece Cuban orchestra, and special guest musicians (Anoushka Shankar on sitar and Le Trio Joubran on oud). The album was released in January 2012. The project toured the world in 2012, during which Wilson continued his role as pianist and musical director.

2013 saw the release of his first album for the trio with Davide Mantovani on bass, and Frank Tontoh and Tristan Banks on drums. The album, Trio, was released on Alex Wilson Records.

== Discography ==
- Anglo Cubano (Candid Records, 1999)
- Afro-Saxon (Candid Records, 2001)
- R&B Latino (Candid Records, 2002)
- Aventuras (Alex Wilson Records, 2005)
- Inglaterra (Alex Wilson Records, 2007)
- Salsa con Soul (Alex Wilson Records, 2008)
- Mali Latino (Alex Wilson Records, 2010)
- Alex Wilson presents Salsa Veritas (Salsa Veritas GmbH 2011)
- Alex Wilson - Trio (Alex Wilson Records, 2013)

Selected Discography as sidesman
1997 Migrations Gary Crosby's Nu Troop 1998 Dreams Come True Sandra Cross
1999 Just a Dream Sandra Cross
2001 Victory's Happy Songbook Cleveland Watkiss
2004 Massive Jazz Jamaica pianist / arranger
2005 Tears of Joy Antonio Forcione
2005 Motor City Roots Jazz Jamaica pianist / arranger
2007 I Love Louis Gwyn Jay Allen musical director, arranger, producer
2007 Boulevard de l’Independence Toumani Diabate
2008 Afropeans Courtney Pine featured guest
2008 Transition in Tradition Courtney Pine
2012 Area 52 Rodrigo y Gabriela - pianist/arranger
2012 Diaspora Wilber Calver - pianist/arranger/producer
