= Dreamsville =

Studio album by Stacey Kent
- Released: May 2001
- Recorded: June 19–21, 2000
- Genre: Vocal jazz
- Length: 54:14
- Label: Candid
- Producer: Alan Bates

Stacey Kent chronology
Let Yourself Go: Celebrating Fred Astaire (2000)	Dreamsville (2001)	In Love Again: The Music of Richard Rodgers (2002)

Dreamsville is a studio album by jazz singer Stacey Kent. It was released in 2001 by Candid Records.

This was Kent's fourth studio album, it was produced by Alan Bates and features her husband, tenor saxophonist Jim Tomlinson.

== Reception ==
Professional ratings
Review scores
Source	Rating
Allmusic	3/5 stars
The Penguin Guide to Jazz Recordings	3/4 stars

David R. Adler, writing on Allmusic.com gave the album three stars out of five. In his review, Adler said that "...Kent may or may not be "the greatest ballad singer in half a century," as her PR claims, but her straightforward renditions of these by-request ballads are not at all generic...There's a certain brassiness, a trumpet-like pointedness, in her voice, as well as a host of endearing idiosyncrasies.

Adler reserves praise for Kent's accompanists, describing Jim Tomlinson's clarinet solo on "Polka Dots and Moonbeams" as "sumptuous" and the interplay of the band on "Little Girl Blue".

== Track listing ==
1. "I've Got a Crush on You" (George Gershwin, Ira Gershwin) - 4:43
2. "When Your Lover Has Gone" (Einar Aaron Swan) - 4:35
3. "Isn't It a Pity?" (G. Gershwin, I. Gershwin) - 5:34
4. "You Are There" (Dave Frishberg, Johnny Mandel) - 2:27
5. "Under a Blanket of Blue" (Jerry Livingston, Al J. Neiburg, Marty Symes) - 4:03
6. "Dreamsville" (Ray Evans, Jay Livingston, Henry Mancini) - 5:35
7. "Polka Dots and Moonbeams" (Johnny Burke, Jimmy Van Heusen) - 4:34
8. "Hushabye Mountain" (Richard M. Sherman, Robert B. Sherman) - 2:38
9. "Little Girl Blue" (Lorenz Hart, Richard Rodgers) - 5:38
10. "You're Looking at Me" (Bobby Troup) - 4:31
11. "Violets for Your Furs" (Tom Adair, Matt Dennis) - 5:44
12. "Thanks for the Memory" (Ralph Rainger, Leo Robin) - 4:12

== Personnel ==
Performance

- Stacey Kent – vocals, arranger
- Jim Tomlinson - tenor saxophone, clarinet, flute, arranger
- David Newton - piano
- Colin Oxley - guitar, arranger
- Simon Thorpe - double bass
- Jasper Kviberg - drums

Production

- Curtis Schwartz - engineer, mixing
- Alan Bates - producer
