= They Can't Take That Away from Me =

1937 song by George and Ira Gershwin

Song by Fred Astaire
- B-side: "(I've Got) Beginner's Luck"
- Published: February 27, 1937 by Gershwin Publishing Corp., New York
- Released: April 1937
- Recorded: March 14, 1937
- Studio: Los Angeles, California
- Genre: Jazz; pop Vocal
- Label: Brunswick 7855
- Composer: George Gershwin
- Lyricist: Ira Gershwin

Fred Astaire singles chronology
"Never Gonna Dance" (1936)	"They Can't Take That Away from Me" (1937)	"They All Laughed" (1937)

"They Can't Take That Away from Me" is a 1937 popular song with music by George Gershwin and lyrics by Ira Gershwin. It was introduced by Fred Astaire in the 1937 film Shall We Dance and gained huge success.

== Overview ==
The song is performed by Astaire on the lonely foggy deck of a ferry from New Jersey to Manhattan. It is sung to Ginger Rogers, who remains silent listening throughout. No dance sequence follows, which was unusual for the Astaire-Rogers numbers. Astaire and Rogers did dance to it later in their last movie The Barkleys of Broadway (1949) in which they played a married couple with marital issues. The song, in the context of Shall We Dance, notes some of the things that Peter (Astaire) will miss about Linda (Rogers). The lyrics include "the way you wear your hat, the way you sip your tea", and "the way you hold your knife, the way we danced till three". Each verse is followed by the line "no, no, they can't take that away from me". The basic meaning of the song is that even if the lovers part, though physically separated the nostalgic memories cannot be forced from them. Thus, it is a song of mixed joy and sadness.

The verse references the song "The Song Is Ended (but the Melody Lingers On)" by Irving Berlin:

Our romance won't end on a sorrowful note, though by tomorrow you're gone. The song is ended, but as the songwriter wrote, 'the melody lingers on'. They may take you from me, I'll miss your fond caress, but though they take you from me I'll still possess...

George Gershwin died two months after the film's release, and he was posthumously nominated for the Academy Award for Best Original Song at the 1937 Oscars but lost out to "Sweet Leilani" which had been made tremendously popular by Bing Crosby.

The song is featured in Kenneth Branagh's musical version of Shakespeare's Love's Labour's Lost (2000), in Stephen Herek's Mr. Holland's Opus (1995), and in Barry Levinson's Rain Man (1988). The melodic hardcore band Strung Out also sampled the song for the intro of "Analog", the opening track on their 2004 album Exile in Oblivion.

== Other recordings ==
- Fred Astaire with Johnny Green and His Orchestra – recorded March 14, 1937
- Billie Holiday – recorded in New York on April 1, 1937
- Artie Shaw – Hollywood, July 14, 1945
- Bing Crosby (recorded November 12, 1947) – included in the album Bing Crosby Sings Songs by George Gershwin.
- Charlie Parker – July 5, 1950, Charlie Parker with Strings
- Mary Lou Williams – The London Sessions (1953)
- Erroll Garner – recorded in Carmel-by-the-Sea, 1955, in Concert By The Sea
- Ella Fitzgerald – recorded in 1956 with Louis Armstrong for Ella and Louis and in 1959 for Ella Fitzgerald Sings the George and Ira Gershwin Songbook
- Mel Tormé – Mel Tormé Sings Fred Astaire (1956)
- Oscar Peterson – Pastel Moods (1956)
- June Christy – for June's Got Rhythm recorded in 1958
- Lester Young with Roy Eldridge and Harry "Sweets" Edison – Laughin' to Keep from Cryin' (1958)
- Frank Sinatra - for his 1954 album Songs for Young Lovers and for his 1962 album Sinatra and Swingin' Brass
- Sam Cooke - for his 1959 album Tribute to the Lady.
- Zoot Sims - for his 1975 album Zoot Sims and the Gershwin Brothers
- Patti Austin - The Real Me (1988)
- Tony Bennett – for Steppin' Out (1993), a Fred Astaire tribute album; a duet with Elvis Costello on Bennett's MTV Unplugged (1994); a duet with Diana Krall on Bennett and Krall's Love Is Here to Stay (2018)
- Lisa Stansfield - for The Glory of Gershwin (1994)
- Tina May – It Ain't Necessarily So (1995)
- Diana Krall – Love Scenes (1997)
- Janet Seidel - The Way You Wear Your Hat (1998)
- Robbie Williams with Rupert Everett – Swing When You're Winning (2001)
- Rod Stewart – It Had to Be You: The Great American Songbook (2002)
- Eliane Elias – Bossa Nova Stories (2008)
- Brian Wilson – Brian Wilson Reimagines Gershwin (2010)
- Cliff Richard – Bold As Brass (2010)
- Stacey Kent – Dreamer In Concert (2011)
- Gloria Estefan - for her 2013 album The Standards
- Van Morrison - for his 2017 album Versatile

== See also ==
- List of 1930s jazz standards
- Great American Songbook
- 1937 in music
