= Nate Najar =

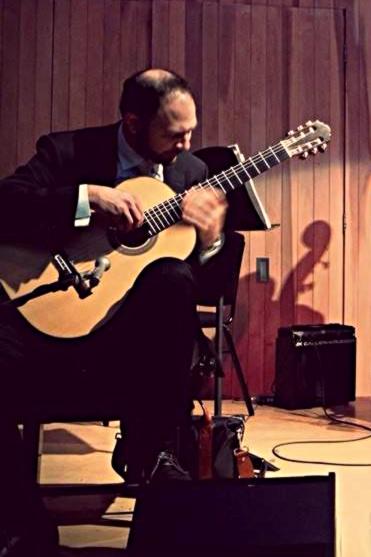
- Nate Najar Trio, London Jazz Festival, 2013 (Najar at left)

Background information
- Born: Nathaniel Bernard Najar; August 28, 1981; St. Petersburg, Florida, U.S.
- Genre: Jazz
- Occupation: Musician
- Instrument: Guitar
- Website: natenajar.com

Nathaniel Bernard Najar (born August 28, 1981), known professionally as Nate Najar, is an American guitarist, music producer, and composer who plays classical guitar within the jazz tradition.

== Early life ==
A native of St. Petersburg, Florida, Najarr studied classical guitar in his teens with Frank Mullen.

== Career ==
Najar has worked with Ken Peplowski, John Lamb, Bucky Pizzarelli, Eric Darius, Chuck Redd, Buster Cooper, Cindy Bradley, Jessy J, and Jonathan Fritzén.

Najar's musical style is influenced by Charlie Byrd, a fingerstyle guitarist who played bossa nova and Brazilian jazz. Najar plays one of Byrd's instruments, a 1974 Ramírez 1A classical guitar.

In addition to local and international festivals and concerts Najar has performed on television composed for films.

Najar has been ranked multiple times on the jazz music charts, including a top ten spot in 2011 for the song "Groove Me", on which he collaborated with singer Melba Moore.

As producer and composer, Najar has worked and recorded throughout the U.S. and abroad at venues and studios such as Nola studios in New York City, where he recorded an album by Lisa Casalino.

== Discography ==
- Jazz Impressions (Blue Line Music, 2002)
- The Cool Sounds of Nate Najar (Blue Line Music, 2003)
- Like Coolsville (Orchard, 2004)
- Swinging with the Nate Najar Quartet (Blue Line Music, 2006)
- I'm All Smiles (Blue Line Music, 2006)
- Christmas with the Nate Najar Trio (Blue Line Music, 2007)
- Until Now (Blue Line Music, 2009)
- Aquarela Do Brasil (Candid, 2014)
- Under Paris Skies (Woodward Avenue Records)
- This Is (Candid, 2015)
- So What's New
- Meet the Graingers (Copanema Records)
- Jazz Samba pra Sempre (Blue Line Records)
- Christmas in December (Woodward Avenue Records)
- Blues for Night People: The Nate Najar Trio Remembers Charlie Byrd (Candid, 2012)
