= Mina Agossi =

French singer-songwriter

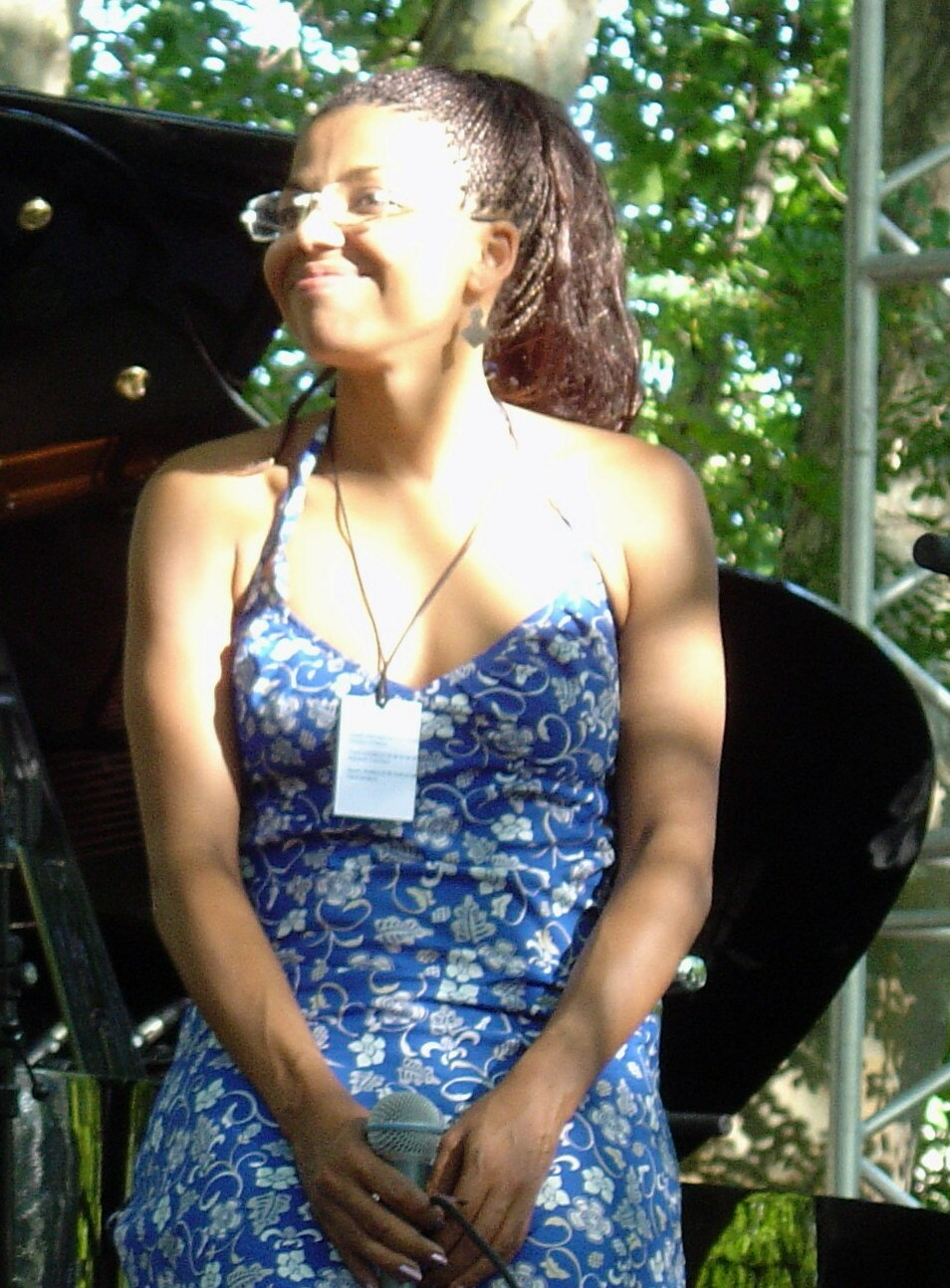
- Mina Agossi
- Born: 6 January 1972 (age 54); Besançon, France
- Notable work: Voice & Bass
- Style: Jazz

Mina Agossi (6 January 1972, Besançon) is a French singer-songwriter.

== Biography ==
Agossi, whose mother is from France and whose father is from Benin, began her career as the protégé of Archie Shepp. In her youth, she lived with her mother, a mathematics professor, in Niger, Morocco and the Ivory Coast. She began her career as a theater actress; in 1993 she sang in a swing and New Orleans jazz band, with whom she toured in France and Ireland. She later shifted to modern jazz and henceforth sang under her own name. Since then, she has worked in a trio composed of vocals, bass and drums and linked her jazz with different musical elements, such as chanson and rock music. Aside from their own compositions, they also covered Thelonious Monk's "Well You Needn't", Jimi Hendrix's "Voodoo Child", Pink Floyd's "Money" and The Beatles's "And I Love Her". After years in Spain she returned to France and then moved to Great Britain in 1993, where she worked with Vincent Guérin.

After the album Voice & Bass, she became increasingly famous in the French jazz scene and also appeared in the United States. Her album EZ Pass to Brooklyn was recorded with Alexander Hiele (bass) and Bertrand Perrin (drums) in New York in 2001, which was influenced by the 11 September 2001 attacks. This album was a stylistic blend of hip-hop and R&B. Since her album Well You Needn't (2005), she performed for Candid and was accompanied by Ichiro Onoe (drums) and Eric Jacot (bass). She performed at the Festival International de Jazz de Montréal in 2007 and in the Blue Note in New York. In 2010 she worked on Just Like a Lady with guitarist and composer Phil Reptil.

She co-produced the music documentary Mina Agossi, une voix nomade (2007) with Arte, which shows her on two international tours with Jean-Henri Meunier, where they also visited their fathers in their homeland.

== Awards ==
Agossi was nominated for the ADAMI in 2005 and for the Victoires du Jazz in 2006. In December 2010 she was knighted as a Chevalier dans l'ordre national du Mérite.

== Discography ==
- 1995 : Les pantalons gris (with Gilles Blandin) (Lord's Records)
- 1997 : Voice and Bass (with Vincent Guérin und Loïc Roignant)
- 2001 : Alkemi (with Philippe Combelle, Eigenproduktion)
- 2001 : E.Z. pass to Brooklyn (live) (Cristal Records)
- 2004 : Carrousel (Cristal Records)
- 2005 : Well You Needn't (Candid)
- 2007 : Who Wants Love? Live at Jazz Standard, New York City (Candid)
- 2008 : Simple Things ? (Candid)
- 2010 : Just Like a Lady (Naïve Records)
- 2011 : Red Eyes (Naïve Records) – featuring Archie Shepp
