= Bold as Brass (album) =

2010 studio album by Cliff Richard

Studio album by Cliff Richard
- Released: 11 October 2010 (UK)
- Recorded: 2009
- Studio: SoundHouse, Nashville, US
- Genre: Traditional pop
- Length: 56:06
- Label: EMI
- Producer: Michael Omartian

Cliff Richard chronology
Reunited – Cliff Richard and The Shadows (2009)	Bold as Brass (2010)	Soulicious (2011)

Bold as Brass is a studio album by Cliff Richard, of songs from the Great American Songbook. It reached No. 3 on the UK Albums Chart.

The album features classic songs written by the like of George Gershwin, Richard Rodgers, Lorenz Hart and Cole Porter.

Following his sold-out concerts around the world in 2009/10, he performed a series of six sold-out shows at London's Royal Albert Hall. Both the concerts and album received positive critical reviews and commercial success. A DVD was released of Bold as Brass, as well as a specially pressed limited edition bonus package.

== Track listing ==
No.	Title	Writer(s)	Length
1.	"Love Me or Leave Me"	Walter Donaldson, Gus Kahn	3:48
2.	"(Up A) Lazy River"	Hoagy Carmichael, Sidney Arodin	3:28
3.	"I've Got You Under My Skin"	Cole Porter	3:19
4.	"I Just Want to Make Love to You"	Willie Dixon	3:55
5.	"They Can't Take That Away from Me"	George Gershwin, Ira Gershwin	4:33
6.	"Let's Fall in Love"	Harold Arlen, Ted Koehler	3:55
7.	"I Didn't Know What Time It Was"	Richard Rodgers, Lorenz Hart	3:40
8.	"Ac-Cent-Tchu-Ate the Positive"	Harold Arlen, Johnny Mercer	3:16
9.	"Teach Me Tonight"	Gene de Paul, Sammy Cahn	3:34
10.	"Don't Get Around Much Anymore"	Duke Ellington, Bob Russell	3:40
11.	"Night and Day"	Cole Porter	3:53
12.	"Bewitched, Bothered and Bewildered"	Richard Rodgers, Lorenz Hart	3:49
13.	"When I Take My Sugar to Tea" (double disc extra)	Irving Kahal, Sammy Fain, Pierre Norman	3:40
14.	"Ev'ry Time We Say Goodbye" (double disc extra)	Cole Porter	3:54

=== Chart positions ===
Chart (2009/2010)	Peak position
Welsh Albums Chart	3
Dutch Albums Chart	79
European Top 100 Albums	13
Danish Albums Chart	23
Australian Albums Chart	244
New Zealand	13
Scottish Albums Chart	8
Belgium Albums Chart	99
UK Albums Chart	3

== Concerts ==
Bold as Brass
- Tour by Cliff Richard
- Start date: 11 October 2010
- End date: 17 October 2010
- Legs: 1
- No. of shows: 6

Cliff Richard concert chronology
- The Final Reunion Tour Cliff Richard and The Shadows (2009-10); Bold as Brass (2010); Soulious (2011)

The six concerts accompanying the release of Bold as Brass centred on Richard's 70th birthday, on 14 October 2010. To celebrate this, Richard was accompanied by a swing band to perform tracks from his album of swing songs, as well as distinguished classics from his 52-year career. Performed at the Royal Albert Hall, London, where he holds the record for playing the most sold-out shows in one run (32), the concerts took over £2m at the box office.

== Tour dates ==
Date	City	Country	Venue	Tickets available
11 October 2010	London	England	Royal Albert Hall	27,000
12 October 2010	London	England	Royal Albert Hall	27,000
13 October 2010	London	England	Royal Albert Hall	27,000
15 October 2010	London	England	Royal Albert Hall	27,000
16 October 2010	London	England	Royal Albert Hall	27,000
17 October 2010	London	England	Royal Albert Hall	27,000

== Tour statistics ==
Region	Cities	Venues	Shows	Tickets available
England	1	1	6	27,000
