= Love Is...The Tender Trap =

Studio album by Stacey Kent
- Released: January 12, 1999
- Recorded: 1999
- Genre: Vocal jazz
- Length: 54:30
- Label: Candid (UK)/Chiaroscuro (USA)
- Producer: Jim Tomlinson

Stacey Kent chronology
| Close Your Eyes (1997) | Love Is...The Tender Trap (1999) | Let Yourself Go: Celebrating Fred Astaire (2000) |

Love Is...The Tender Trap is a 1999 studio album by Stacey Kent.

Kent's second studio album, it was produced by and features her husband, tenor saxophonist Jim Tomlinson. In an interview with Billboard magazine to promote the album Kent said that "Even when I'm singing of unrequited love, it may not reflect my life, but the quality of the song allows me to deliver it truthfully".

== Reception ==
Professional ratings
Review scores
| Source | Rating |
|---|---|
| AllMusic | 3/5 stars |
| The Penguin Guide to Jazz Recordings | 3.5/4 stars |

Scott Yanow, writing for AllMusic, thought that Kent "has an attractive voice and a lightly swinging style." He added that she "uplifts each of the familiar tunes slightly but does not add much of herself to the material," and concluded by remarking on her future potential.

== Track listing ==
1. "The Tender Trap" (Sammy Cahn, Jimmy Van Heusen) – 4:42
2. "I Didn't Know About You" (Duke Ellington, Bob Russell) – 4:43
3. "Comes Love" (Lew Brown, Sam H. Stept, Charles Tobias) – 4:04
4. "In the Still of the Night" (Cole Porter) – 5:08
5. "Fools Rush In (Where Angels Fear to Tread)" (Rube Bloom, Johnny Mercer) – 4:43
6. "East of the Sun" (Brooks Bowman) – 6:36
7. "Zing! Went the Strings of My Heart" (James F. Hanley) – 4:14
8. "They Say It's Wonderful" (Irving Berlin) – 4:57
9. "Don't Be That Way" (Benny Goodman, Mitchell Parish, Edgar Sampson) – 4:22
10. "They All Laughed" (George Gershwin, Ira Gershwin) – 4:01
11. "In the Wee Small Hours of the Morning" (Bob Hilliard, David Mann) – 4:59
12. "It's a Wonderful World" (Harold Adamson, Jan Savitt, Johnny Watson) – 4:21

== Personnel ==
Performance

- Stacey Kent – vocals, arranger
- Jim Tomlinson – tenor saxophone, arranger, producer
- David Newton – piano
- Colin Oxley – guitar, arranger
- David Green – double bass
- Jeff Hamilton – drums, arranger

Production

- Curtis Schwartz – engineer, mixing
- Alan Bates – executive producer
- Jay Livingston – liner notes
- Jennifer Abbott – photography
