= Klaus Ignatzek =

German jazz pianist, composer and band leader

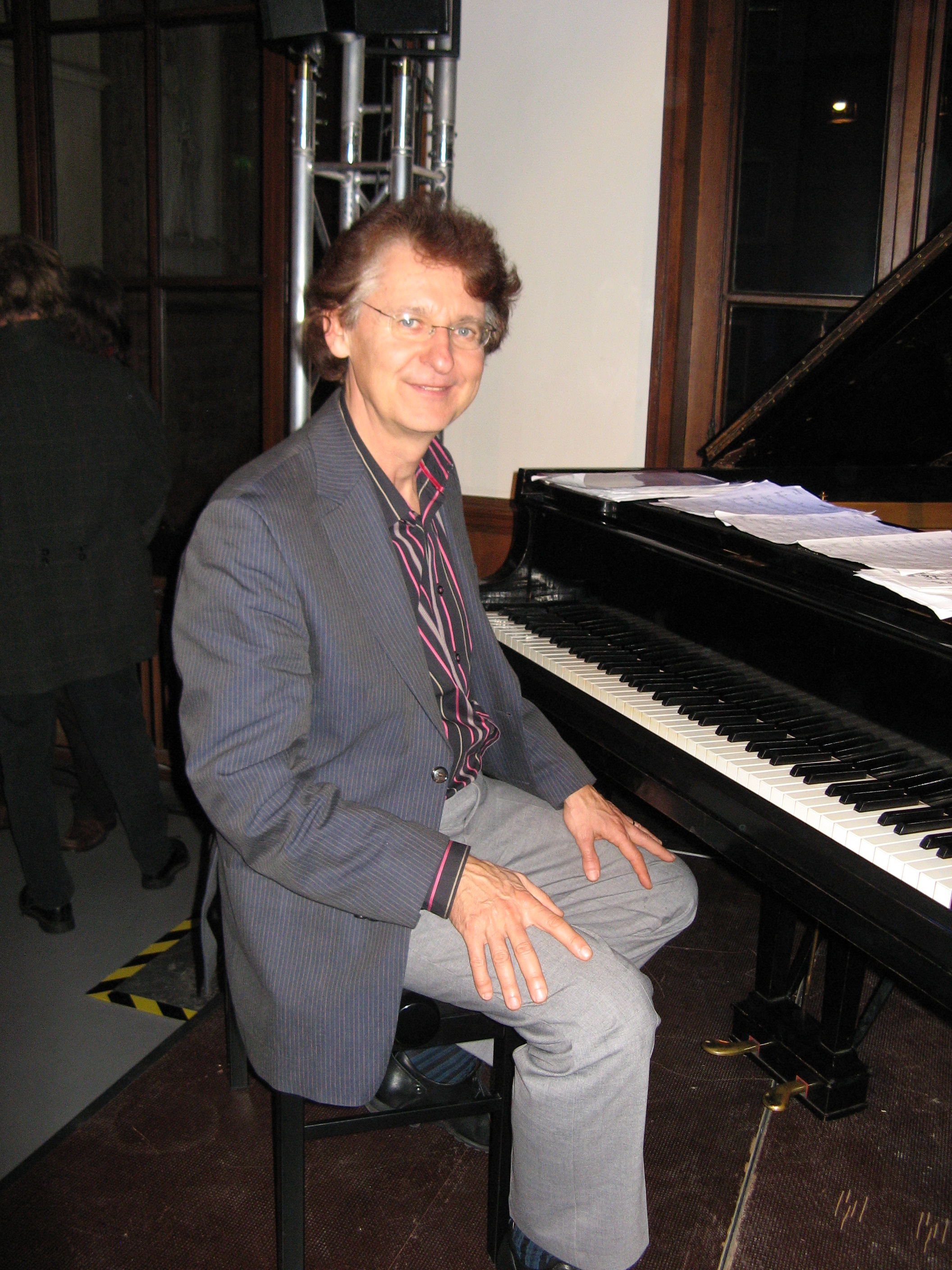
Klaus Ignatzek.

Klaus Ignatzek is a German jazz pianist, composer and band leader who has recorded as leader for Nagel-Heyer Records, Red Records, Timeless Records, and Candid Records.

Ignatzek was born November 4, 1954, in Wilhelmshaven, Germany. As jazz pianist he has been part of the formations Crossing, Jazzwheel, Klaus Ignatzek / Florian Poser Duo, Klaus Ignatzek / Martin Wind Duo, Klaus Ignatzek Group, Klaus Ignatzek Quartet, Klaus Ignatzek Quintet, Klaus Ignatzek Trio, The Klaus Ignatzek Jazztet, Voss Ignatzek Duo.
