= The Boy Next Door (album) =

Studio album by Stacey Kent
- Released: August 26, 2003
- Recorded: February 18–22, 2003; Curtis Schwartz Studios, Ardingly, England
- Genre: Vocal jazz
- Language: English
- Label: Candid Records (UK)
- Producer: Alan Bates

Stacey Kent chronology
Christmas Song (2003)	The Boy Next Door (2003)	Shall We Dance? (2004)

The Boy Next Door is a 2003 album by jazz singer Stacey Kent. The songs were chosen to reflect male singers that Kent admires.

== Reception ==
Professional ratings
Review scores
Source	Rating
The Penguin Guide to Jazz Recordings	3/4 stars

David Jeffries, reviewed the album for AllMusic and wrote that "With a gentle conviction akin to early Blossom Dearie without the cheeky flair, the album makes for breezy listening. ...individual moments of warm openhearted excellence make it worthwhile.". Jeffries highlighted Kent's performances on "Bookends" and "'Tis Autumn", and reserved praise for drummer Matt Home. Jeffries described the guitarist Colin Oxley's solo "Too Darn Hot" as the album's "greatest moment".

== Track listing ==
No.	Title	Writer(s)	Length
1.	"The Best Is Yet to Come"	Cy Coleman, Carolyn Leigh	3:24
2.	"The Boy Next Door"	Hugh Martin, Ralph Blane	3:38
3.	"The Trolley Song"	Martin, Blane	4:00
4.	"Say It Isn't So"	Irving Berlin	4:39
5.	"Too Darn Hot"	Cole Porter	3:25
6.	"Makin' Whoopee"	Walter Donaldson, Gus Kahn	3:03
7.	"What the World Needs Now Is Love"	Burt Bacharach, Hal David	4:07
8.	"You've Got a Friend"	Carole King	4:18
9.	"I Got It Bad"	Duke Ellington, Paul Francis Webster	4:52
10.	"Ooh-Shoo-Be-Doo-Bee"	Joe Carroll, Bill Graham	3:01
11.	"People Will Say We're in Love"	Richard Rodgers, Oscar Hammerstein II	3:42
12.	"'Tis Autumn"	Henry Nemo	4:26
13.	"All I Do Is Dream of You"	Nacio Herb Brown, Arthur Freed	3:22
14.	"I Get Along Without You Very Well"	Hoagy Carmichael	3:23
15.	"You're the Top"	Porter	2:26
16.	"Bookends"	Paul Simon	1:06

== Musicians ==
- Stacey Kent - vocals
- Jim Tomlinson – saxophones, backing vocals
- Curtis Schwartz - backing vocals
- Colin Oxley - guitar
- David Newton – piano, keyboards, backing vocals
- Dave Chamberlain – double bass
- Matt Home - drums
