= Jim Tomlinson =

British musician (born 1966)

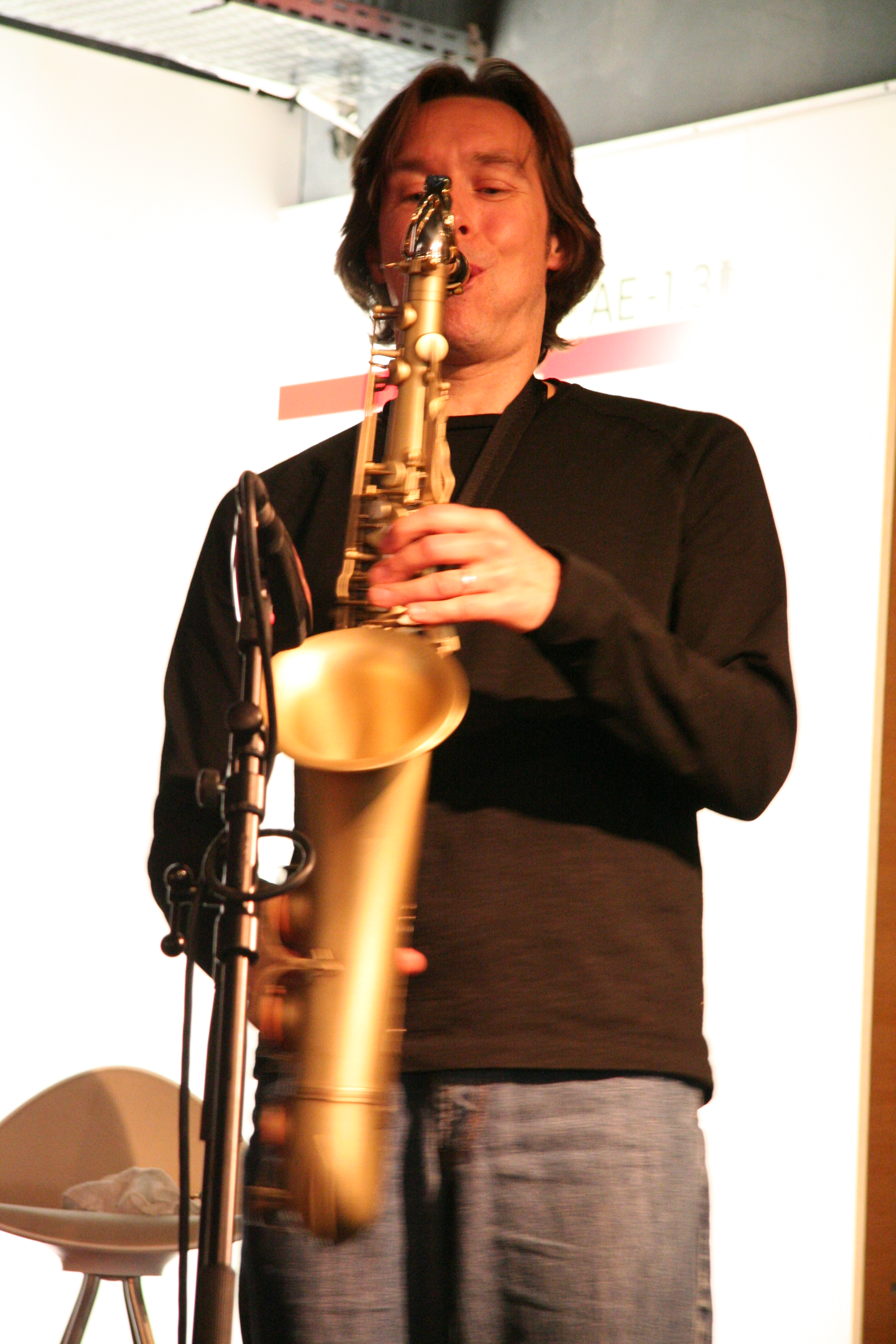
- Tomlinson at Fnac, Montparnasse, Paris, in 2007

Background information
- Born: 9 September 1966 (age 60); Sutton Coldfield, Warwickshire, England
- Genres: Jazz; bossa nova; latin jazz; Adult contemporary; smooth jazz; easy listening
- Occupations: Musician, arranger, composer
- Instruments: Tenor saxophone, clarinet, flute
- Years active: 1990–present
- Labels: Candid, O-Plus
- Website: www.jimtomlinson.net

Jim Tomlinson (born 9 September 1966) is a British tenor saxophonist, clarinetist, flautist, producer, arranger and composer. He is married to singer Stacey Kent.

== Early life ==
Tomlinson was born in Sutton Coldfield, Warwickshire, England. He grew up in Northumberland, then attended Oxford University where he studied philosophy, politics, and economics. Meanwhile, he was playing clarinet and saxophones, mostly the tenor, and developing his interest in jazz. In his postgraduate year, he studied at London's Guildhall School of Music and Drama and began to establish himself on the local jazz scene. His reputation quickly spread, and he was soon working with noted musicians, including Matt Wates, Humphrey Lyttelton, and Michael Garrick,. With Garrick, he recorded For Love Of Duke And Ronnie.

In the 90s, Tomlinson was frequently leader of his own quartet, touring extensively in the UK. He is also well known for his work as the counter-voice to singer and wife Stacey Kent, whom he married on 9 August 1991 and whose albums he has produced since 1997. In 2006, he began composing with Nobel Prize winning novelist Kazuo Ishiguro, who writes fanciful, mildly surreal lyrics to Tomlinson's music. Tomlinson and Ishiguro have co-written several songs for Kent's albums from 2007 on.

== Early career ==
Tomlinson did not study music formally until well into his 20s. He played saxophone and ran a band as a hobby whilst studying for his degree in Politics, Philosophy and Economics at University College, Oxford. It was only after graduating and finding himself drawn to London's jazz scene that he enrolled at the Guildhall School of Music and Drama in 1990.

The release of his debut album as leader, Only Trust Your Heart (Candid 2000), received widespread acclaim. His follow-up CD, Brazilian Sketches (2003), was named Jazz CD Of The Week by the Observer newspaper in the UK.

Since then, Tomlinson has worked in a wide variety of groups, from Bryan Ferry to the experimental big band of composer Michael Garrick. Tomlinson's own quartet has appeared at clubs and festivals across Europe. Most recently, he has toured almost exclusively with Stacey Kent in Europe, USA, Brazil and the Far East, reserving time to perform in a quintet dedicated to the music of Lester Young with fellow saxophonist and Guildhall graduate Mark Crooks.

== Awards ==
- The Lyric (2005) featuring Stacey Kent (Token Records/Warner), "Album of the Year", BBC Jazz Awards
- In 2007, Jim produced Stacey's platinum selling, Grammy-nominated Blue Note album, Breakfast on the Morning Tram, for which he also co-wrote four songs with the Nobel prize winning author Kazuo Ishiguro Their song, "The Ice Hotel", won first prize in the jazz category of the 2007 International Songwriting Competition and "So Romantic" was a finalist in the 2008 competition.

== Personal life ==
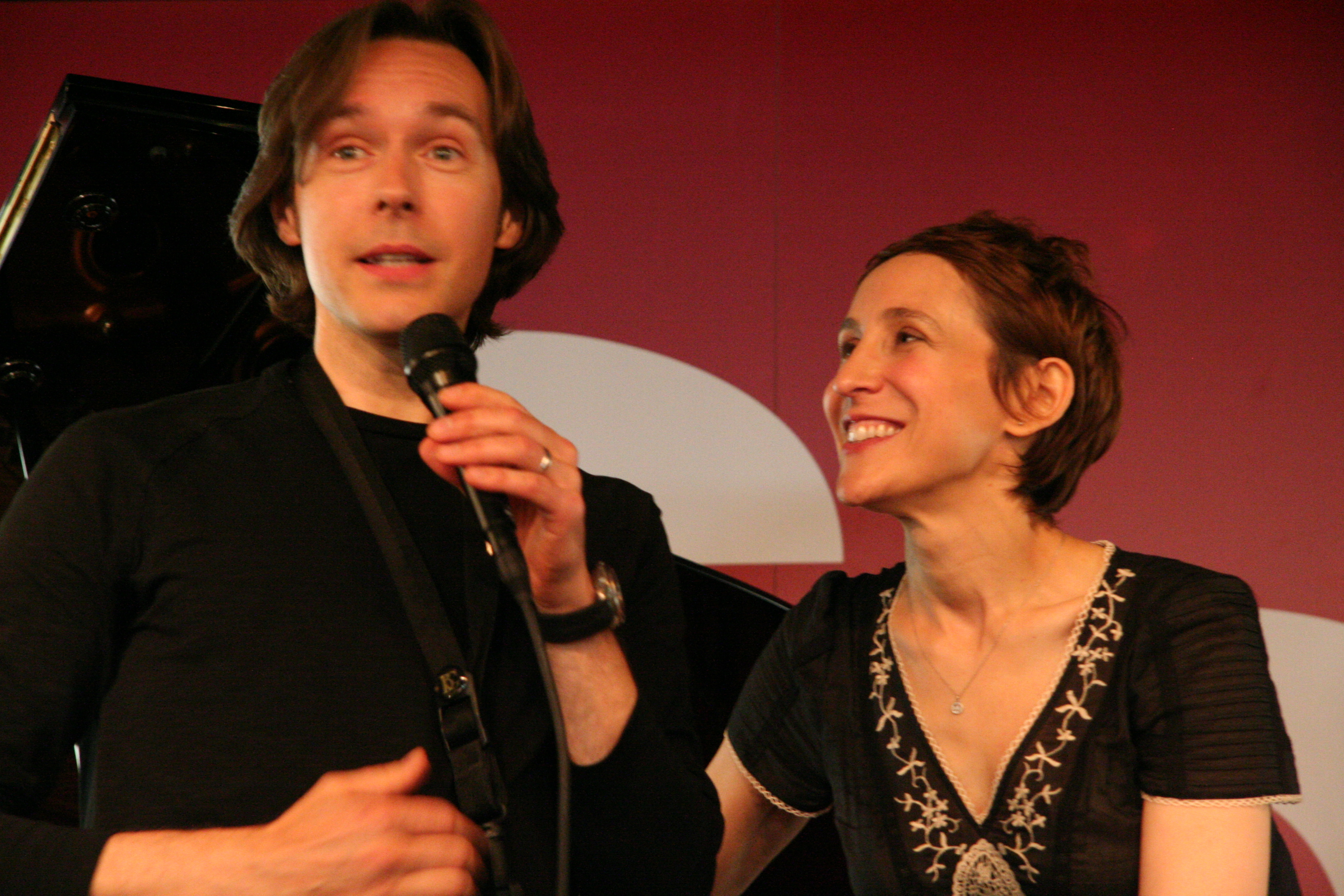
With wife Stacey Kent at the Montparnasse Fnac, Paris, France in 2007

Tomlinson married American singer Stacey Kent on 9 August 1991. They are both accomplished skiers. Only touring commitments in March 2006, 2007, 2008 and 2009 prevented them from racing in the NASTAR US Championships, for which they both qualified in consecutive seasons. Tomlinson and his wife, who are based in England, have built up large followings in France and Germany.

Their tours, since the release of Breakfast on the Morning Tram, have taken them to over 50 countries.

== Musical influences ==
Tomlinson has been greatly influenced by Stan Getz and Lester Young. Tomlinson and Kent have said that the early bossa nova recordings of João Gilberto, Astrud Gilberto, Antonio Carlos Jobim and Stan Getz remain the foundation of what they do. In the liner notes to one of his CDs, Tomlinson wrote: "As a fourteen year old saxophonist living in the far north of England, keen to expose himself to the world of jazz, I had a little option when shopping for records but to operate on the rule of thumb, 'if there is a saxophone on the cover, buy it.' This is how I chanced upon the cover of Getz/Gilberto. Neither of the names meant anything to me, but I was intrigued that the saxophonist on the back cover had a handkerchief stuffed down the bell of his horn (I still am!) and I bought the record. Suffice it to say that twenty years later, the music of Stan Getz is a continuing source of inspiration to me and my passion for bossa nova is unabated."

== Discography ==
- 2000: Only Trust Your Heart, Candid Records
- 2003: Brazilian Sketches, Candid Records
- 2006: The Lyric, Token Records/Warner

== Discography as producer / performer ==
- Close Your Eyes (Candid, 1997), performer, producer for Stacey Kent
- Love Is...The Tender Trap (Candid, 1999), performer, producer for Stacey Kent
- Let Yourself Go: Celebrating Fred Astaire (Candid, 2000), Performer, producer for Stacey Kent
- Dreamsville (Candid, 2001), performer, producer for Stacey Kent
- In Love Again: The Music of Richard Rodgers (Candid, 2002), Performer, producer for Stacey Kent
- The Boy Next Door (Candid, 2003), performer, producer for Stacey Kent
- The Lyric, Jim Tomlinson (Token Records/Warner, 2005), Producer.
- Breakfast on the Morning Tram (Blue Note/EMI, 2007), performer, producer for Stacey Kent
- Raconte-moi... (Blue Note/EMI, 2010), performer, producer for Stacey Kent
- Dreamer in Concert (Blue Note/EMI, 2011), performer, producer for Stacey Kent
- The Changing Lights (2013, Parlophone/Warner, 2013), performer, producer for Stacey Kent
- Ao Vivo with Marcos Valle (Sony, 2013) Performer, Co-producer.
- Brazil with Quatuor Ébène, Bernard Lavilliers (Erato/Warner, 2014) Performer.
- Tenderly (Sony, 2015) Performer, producer for Stacey Kent
- I Know I Dream: The Orchestral Sessions (Sony, 2017) Performer, producer, conductor, co-arranger for Stacey Kent

== Songwriting ==
- "The Ice Hotel", Jim Tomlinson / Kazuo Ishiguro, on Stacey Kent's 2007 Grammy-nominated album, Breakfast on the Morning Tram.[17].
- "I Wish I Could Go Travelling Again", Jim Tomlinson / Kazuo Ishiguro – Stacey Kent's album, Breakfast on the Morning Tram.[17] (2007).
- "Breakfast on the Morning Tram", Jim Tomlinson / Kazuo Ishiguro – Stacey Kent's album, Breakfast on the Morning Tram.[17] (2007).
- "So Romantic", Jim Tomlinson / Kazuo Ishiguro – Stacey Kent's album, Breakfast on the Morning Tram.[17] (2007).
- "Sait-on Jamais?", Jim Tomlinson / Camille d"Avril – Stacey Kent's album, Raconte-moi, (2010).
- "Postcard Lovers", Jim Tomlinson / Kazuo Ishiguro – Stacey Kent's album, "Dreamer in Concert", (2011).
- "O Comboio", Jim Tomlinson / António Ladeira – Stacey Kent's album, "Dreamer in Concert", (2011).
- "The Summer We Crossed Europe in the Rain", Jim Tomlinson / Kazuo Ishiguro – Stacey Kent's album, The Changing Lights.[18] (2013.)
- "Waiter, Oh Waiter", Jim Tomlinson / Kazuo Ishiguro – Stacey Kent's album, The Changing Lights.[18] (2013.)
- "The Changing Lights", Jim Tomlinson / Kazuo Ishiguro – Stacey Kent's album, The Changing Lights.[18] (2013.)
- "Chanson Legère, Jim Tomlinson / Bernie Beaupère – Stacey Kent's album, The Changing Lights.[18] (2013.)
- "A Tarde", Jim Tomlinson / António Ladeira – Stacey Kent's album, The Changing Lights.[18] (2013.)
- "Bullet Train", Jim Tomlinson / Kazuo Ishiguro – Stacey Kent's album, I Know I Dream: The Orchestral Sessions (2017).
- "The Ice Hotel", Jim Tomlinson / Kazuo Ishiguro – Stacey Kent's album, I Know I Dream: The Orchestral Sessions, (2017).
- "The Ice Hotel", Jim Tomlinson / Kazuo Ishiguro – Quatuor Ébène, featuring Stacey Kent, album, “Brazil” (2013).
- "The Changing Lights", Jim Tomlinson / Kazuo Ishiguro – Stacey Kent's album, I Know I Dream: The Orchestral Sessions, (2017).
- "I Know I Dream", Jim Tomlinson / Cliff Goldmache – Stacey Kent's album, "I Know I Dream: The Orchestral Sessions", (2017).
- "Make It Up", Jim Tomlinson / Cliff Goldmache – Stacey Kent's album, "I Know I Dream: The Orchestral Sessions", (2017).
