= Stacey Kent =

American jazz singer (born 1965)

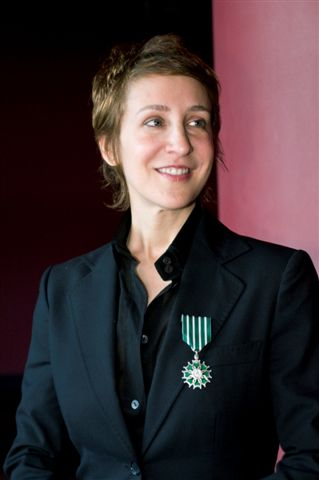
- Kent in 2009

Background information
- Born: March 27, 1965 (age 61); South Orange, New Jersey, U.S.
- Genres: Jazz, vocal jazz
- Occupation: Singer
- Years active: 1996–present
- Labels: Candid, Blue Note, Warner, Sony, Naïve
- Website: staceykent.com

Stacey Kent (born March 27, 1965) is an American jazz singer from South Orange, New Jersey.

Kent was nominated for a Grammy Award and was awarded the Chevalier de l'Ordre des Arts et des Lettres (Order of Arts and Letters) by the French Minister of Culture in 2009. She is married to saxophonist and composer Jim Tomlinson, who produces Kent's albums and writes songs for her with his lyricist partner, novelist Kazuo Ishiguro.

== Early life and education ==
Kent was born in South Orange, New Jersey. Her paternal grandfather grew up in France. After graduating from Sarah Lawrence College, she traveled to England to study music at the Guildhall School of Music and Drama in London, where she met saxophonist Jim Tomlinson, whom she married on August 9, 1991. Kent also attended Middlebury College Language Schools in Middlebury, Vermont for eight summers, enrolled in the Italian, German, Portuguese and French programs.

== Career ==
Kent began her professional career in the 1990s, singing at Café Bohème in London's Soho. After two or three years, she began opening for established acts at Ronnie Scott's Jazz Club in London. In 1995, she appeared in Richard Loncraine's film Richard III (starring Ian McKellen), singing "The Passionate Shepherd to His Love" (Come Live with Me and Be My Love) with lyrics by Christopher Marlowe and composed by Trevor Jones, at the Grand Ball celebrating the Yorkist triumph in the Wars of the Roses. Her first album, Close Your Eyes, was released in 1997.

Novelist Kazuo Ishiguro wrote the liner notes to Kent's 2002 album, In Love Again. Ishiguro met Kent after he chose her recording of "They Can't Take That Away from Me" as one of his Desert Island Discs in 2002. In 2006, Tomlinson and Ishiguro began to write songs for her. Ishiguro has said of his lyric writing that "with an intimate, confiding, first-person song, the meaning must not be self-sufficient on the page. It has to be oblique, sometimes you have to read between the lines" and that this realization has had an "enormous influence" on his fiction writing. In March, 2024, Ishiguro published a book entitled The Summer We Crossed Europe in the Rain: lyrics for Stacey Kent, containing 16 of his lyrics for Kent, with illustrations by Italian-French artist, Bianca Bagnarelli, (Faber & Faber).

Tomlinson and Ishiguro co-wrote four songs on the album Breakfast on the Morning Tram. The first of their songs, "The Ice Hotel", won first prize in the International Songwriting Competition in April 2008. Kent recorded several more Tomlinson/Ishiguro songs on Dreamer In Concert, The Changing Lights, and I Know I Dream: The Orchestral Sessions.

Tomlinson and Ishiguro subsequently wrote songs for her albums Dreamer, The Changing Lights and I Know I Dream, and continue to write for her.

=== Popular success ===
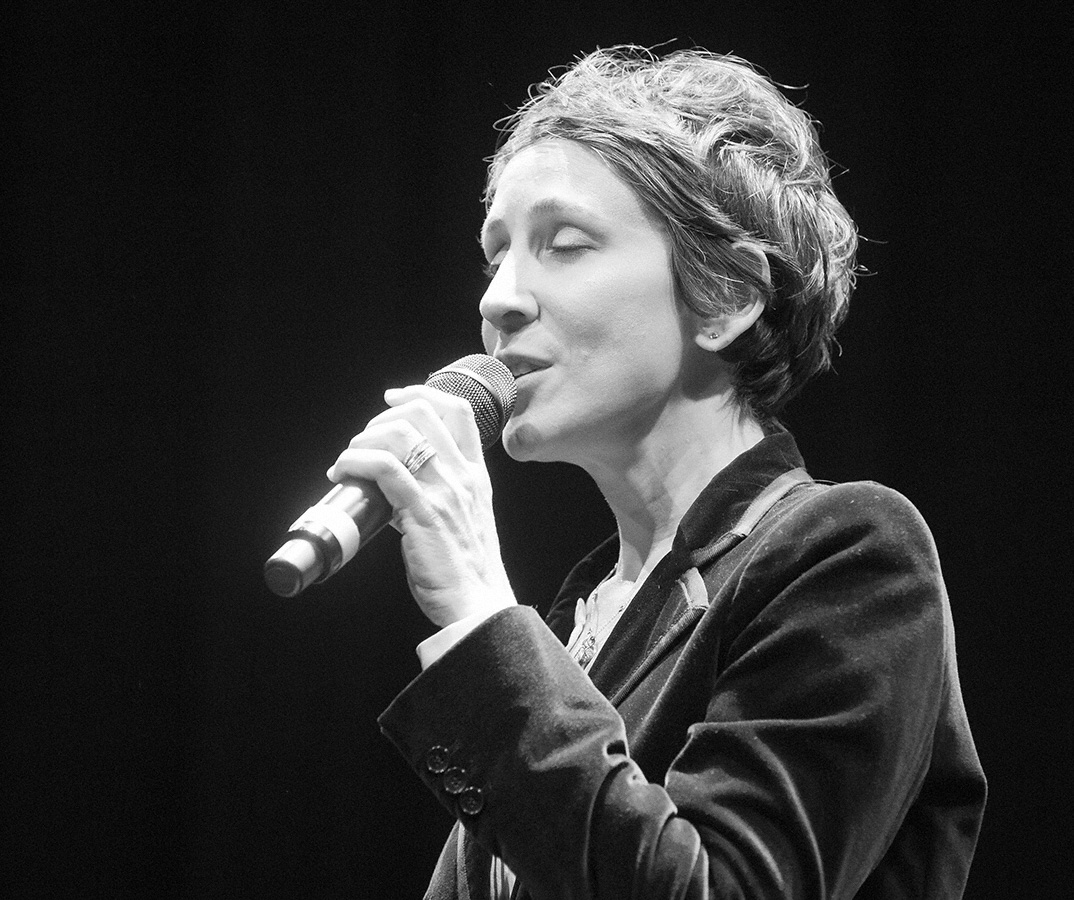
Stacey Kent onstage in 2016

Kent's album The Boy Next Door achieved Gold album status in France in September 2006. Breakfast on the Morning Tram (2007) achieved Platinum album status in France in November 2007 and Double Gold status in Germany in February 2008. Raconte-moi... was recorded in French and achieved Gold status in both France and Germany and became the second best selling French-language album worldwide in 2010.

Dreamer In Concert (2011) was recorded in May, 2011 at La Cigale in Paris. It includes three songs previously unrecorded by Kent: "Waters of March" by Antônio Carlos Jobim, "Postcard Lovers" by Jim Tomlinson with lyrics by Kazuo Ishiguro, and "O Comboio" by Portuguese poet António Ladeira.

In 2013, Kent released The Changing Lights, a Brazilian-tinged album, covering bossa nova classics such as Jobim's "How Insensitive" and again collaborating with Tomlinson and Ishiguro. In 2014, she left Warner Bros. and signed with Sony. Sony released Tenderly, an album of standards with Roberto Menescal, one of the founders of bossa nova. She met Menescal in Brazil in 2011 at the 80th birthday celebration of the Christ the Redeemer statue. They discovered they were fans of each other's work and collaborated on an album of standards inspired by Menescal's admiration for the duo of Julie London and Barney Kessel.

In 2014, Marcos Valle invited her to tour in celebration of the 50th anniversary of his career. They recorded the album Ao Vivo and a DVD that was recorded live at the Birdland club in New York City and the Blue Note in Tokyo.

In 2017, Kent recorded her next album for Sony, I Know I Dream: The Orchestral Sessions, her first album with an orchestra, comprising 58 musicians with arrangements by Tommy Laurence, with music from the Great American Songbook, French chansons, songs by Edu Lobo, Jobim, Tomlinson, Ishiguro, Ladeira and his songwriting partner, Cliff Goldmacher from Nashville. Tomlinson and Goldmacher wrote the title song.

In 2020, Kent released a series of singles and EPs, including "Christmas in the Rockies", "Three Little Birds", "Lovely Day", "Landslide", "I Wish I Could Go Travelling Again", "Bonita" and "Craigie Burn" as a duet with her longtime pianist Art Hirahara. Several of these singles become part of an album released in October 2021, "Songs From Other Places", for which Kent won Best Vocal Performance at the Jazz Music Awards in Atlanta, Georgia in October 2022.

Kent has sold more than 2 million albums worldwide, with more than one billion streams.

== Awards and honors ==
- British Jazz Award, 2001
- BBC Jazz Award, Best Vocalist, 2002
- Backstage Bistro Award, 2004
- BBC Jazz Award, Album of the Year, The Lyric, 2006
- Grammy Award nomination, Best Vocal Jazz Album, Breakfast on the Morning Tram, 2009
- Chevalier dans l'Ordre des Arts et des Lettres, 2009
- Jazz Japan Award for 'Best Vocal Album', I Know I Dream: The Orchestral Sessions, 2018
- Winner of 'Best Vocal Performance' at the Jazz Music Awards for Songs From Other Places, 2022
- Winner of 'Prix Ella Fitzgerald' at the Montreal International Jazz Festival, 2023
- Award "La Granada del Festival de Jazz”, Granada International Jazz Festival, 2023

== Discography ==
- Stacey Kent Sings (July 1995, possible demo recording)
- Close Your Eyes (Candid, 1997)
- Love Is...The Tender Trap (Candid, 1998)
- Let Yourself Go: Celebrating Fred Astaire (Candid, 1999)
- Dreamsville (Candid, 2000)
- In Love Again: The Music of Richard Rodgers (Candid, 2002)
- The Boy Next Door (Candid, 2003)
- The Lyric, Stacey Kent with Jim Tomlinson (Token, 2006)
- Breakfast on the Morning Tram (EMI/Blue Note, 2007)
- Raconte-moi... (EMI/Blue Note, 2010)
- Dreamer In Concert (EMI/Blue Note, 2011)
- The Changing Lights (EMI/Blue Note/Warner, 2013)
- Tenderly (Sony/Okeh, 2015)
- I Know I Dream: The Orchestral Sessions (Sony/Okeh, 2017)
- Christmas in the Rockies (Candid/Token, 2020) 2020)
- Songs from Other Places (Believe/Candid/Token, 2021)
- Summer Me, Winter Me (Naïve Records, 2023)
- A Time for Love (Naïve Records, 2026)

=== Singles ===
- Three Little Birds (Single, Exceleration/Token 2020)
- Lovely Day (Single, Exceleration/Token 2021)
- I Wish I Could Go Travelling Again (Single, from "Songs From Other Places" series. Exceleration/Token 2021)
- Landslide (Single, from "Songs From Other Places" series. Exceleration/Token 2021)
- Bonita (Single, from "Songs From Other Places" series. Exceleration/Token 2021)
- Craigie Burn (Single, from "Songs From Other Places" series. Exceleration/Token 2021)
- American Tune (Single, from "Songs From Other Places" series. Exceleration/Token 2021)
- The Shadow of Your Smile (Single, from "A Time For Love”. naïve/Token 2025)

== As featured vocalist ==
- Eau Calme with enzo enzo (2020) - one song
- Frenchy with Thomas Dutronc (Sony, 2019) - one song
- Danilo Caymmi Canta Jobim with Danilo Caymmi (Sony, 2013) - one song
- Ao Vivo DVD with Marcos Valle (Sony, 2015) - full DVD
- Ao Vivo with Marcos Valle (Sony, 2013) - full album
- Brazil with Quatuor Ébène, Bernard Lavilliers (Erato/Warner, 2014) - six songs
- Fiction with Quatuor Ébène, (Erato/Warner, 2012) - one song
- Jan Lundgren Trio Plays the Music of Victor Young with Jan Lundgren Trio, (Sittel, 2001) - three songs
