= Sinatra–Jobim Sessions =

Sinatra-Jobim Sessions

Compilation album by Frank Sinatra & Antônio Carlos Jobim
- Released: 1979
- Recorded: 1967, 1969
- Genre: Jazz; bossa nova
- Length: 50:27
- Label: WEA Brasil

Frank Sinatra chronology
Portrait of Sinatra – Forty Songs from the Life of a Man (1977)	Sinatra-Jobim Sessions (1979)	Trilogy: Past Present Future (1980)

Antônio Carlos Jobim chronology
Urubu (1976)	Sinatra-Jobim Sessions (1979)	Terra Brasilis (1980)

The Sinatra–Jobim Sessions is a 1979 double LP compilation album of American singer Frank Sinatra's work with Antônio Carlos Jobim. The album was published only in Brazil by producer Roberto Quartin, and had never been re-released on vinyl or CD until 2010 when it was re-mastered and released under The Frank Sinatra Collection and became available worldwide.

All but three songs recorded by Sinatra and Jobim in 1967 and 1969 were released on Francis Albert Sinatra & Antônio Carlos Jobim (1967) and Sinatra & Company (1971). The tracks "Bonita", "Sabiá", and "Off Key (Desafinado)", however, were originally only available on the 8-track Sinatra-Jobim (1969), which was quickly pulled from release. The first two of these tracks later appeared on the 1977 UK compilation album Portrait of Sinatra, but were also included on Sinatra-Jobim Sessions, making it eagerly sought by collectors. "Off Key (Desafinado)" was not included here and remained largely unavailable until Sinatra's The Complete Reprise Studio Recordings was released in 1995. This collection also included two recordings which do not actually feature Jobim, "Drinking Again" and "Manhã De Carnaval". In 2010 the Concord Records label issued a new compilation entitled Sinatra/Jobim: The Complete Reprise Recordings.

Sinatra and Jobim worked together for a final time in 1994 on Duets II, recording a cover of "Fly Me to the Moon".

== Track listing ==
1. "Baubles, Bangles and Beads" (Robert C. Wright, George Forrest, Alexander Borodin) – 2:32
2. "I Concentrate on You" (Cole Porter) – 2:32
3. "Dindi" (Ray Gilbert, Antônio Carlos Jobim, Aloysio de Oliveria) – 3:25
4. "Change Partners" (Irving Berlin) – 2:40
5. "Corcovado" (Jobim, Gene Lees) – 2:45
6. "If You Never Come to Me (Inútil Paisagem)" (Jobim, Gilbert, de Oliveira) – 2:10
7. "The Girl from Ipanema" (Jobim, Norman Gimbel, Vinícius de Moraes) – 3:00
8. "Meditation" (Jobim, Gimbel, Newton Mendonça) – 2:51
9. "Once I Loved (O Amor em Paz)" (Jobim, Gilbert, de Moraes) – 2:37
10. "How Insensitive" (Jobim, Gimbel, de Moraes) – 3:15
11. "Drinking Again" (Johnny Mercer, Doris Tauber) – 3:13
12. "One Note Samba" (Jobim, Mendonça) – 2:20
13. "Don't Ever Go Away (Por Causa de Você)" (Gilbert, Dolores Duran, Jobim) – 2:28
14. "Wave" (Jobim) – 3:25
15. "Bonita" (Gilbert, Lees, Jobim) – 3:39
16. "Someone to Light Up My Life" (de Moraes, Jobim, Lees) – 2:37
17. "Drinking Water (Agua de Beber)" (de Moraes, Jobim, Gimbel) – 2:35
18. "The Song of the Sabiá (Sabiá)" (Jobim, Chico Buarque) – 3:38
19. "This Happy Madness (Estrada Branca)" (de Moraes, Jobim, Lees) – 2:57
20. "Triste" (Jobim) – 2:40
21. "Manhã De Carnaval (A Day in the Life of a Fool)" (Sigman, Bonfá) – 2:59

== Personnel ==
- Frank Sinatra – Vocals
- Antônio Carlos Jobim – Piano, Guitar, Vocals
- Claus Ogerman – Arranger, Conductor (Tracks 1–11)
- Eumir Deodato – Arranger (Tracks 12–20)
- Morris Stoloff – Conductor (Tracks 12–20)
- Don Costa – Arranger, Conductor

== See also ==
- Francis Albert Sinatra & Antonio Carlos Jobim
- Sinatra & Company
