= Sinatra/Jobim: The Complete Reprise Recordings =

Compilation album by Frank Sinatra and Antônio Carlos Jobim
- Released: May 4, 2010
- Recorded: January 30, February 1, 1967 – February 1969
- Genre: Vocal jazz; traditional pop; bossa nova
- Length: 58:14
- Label: Universal
- Producer: Charles Pignone

Frank Sinatra and Antônio Carlos Jobim chronology
Come Fly Away (2010)	Sinatra/Jobim: The Complete Reprise Recordings (2010)	The Reprise Years (2010)

Professional ratings
Review scores
Source	Rating
Allmusic	4/5 stars

Sinatra/Jobim: The Complete Reprise Recordings is a 2010 compilation album by Frank Sinatra, consisting of 20 tracks he recorded with the Brazilian musician Antônio Carlos Jobim.

== Track listing ==
1. "The Girl from Ipanema" (Antônio Carlos Jobim, Norman Gimbel, Vinícius de Moraes) – 3:20
2. "Dindi" (Ray Gilbert, Jobim, Aloysio de Oliveria) – 3:31
3. "Change Partners" (Irving Berlin) – 2:43
4. "Quiet Nights of Quiet Stars" (Jobim, Gene Lees) – 2:45
5. "Meditation" (Jobim, Gimbel, Newton Mendonça) – 2:55
6. "If You Never Come to Me" (Jobim, Gilbert, de Oliveira) – 2:11
7. "How Insensitive" (Jobim, Gimbel, de Moraes) – 3:18
8. "I Concentrate on You" (Cole Porter) – 2:39
9. "Baubles, Bangles and Beads" (Robert Wright, George Forrest, Alexander Borodin) – 2:36
10. "Once I Loved (O Amor em Paz)" (Jobim, Gilbert, de Moraes) – 2:38
11. "The Song of the Sabia (Sabiá)" – (Jobim, Chico Buarque, Gimbel) – 3:40
12. "Drinking Water (Agua de Beber)" (de Moraes, Jobim, Gimbel) – 2:37
13. "Someone to Light Up My Life" (de Moraes, Jobim, Lees) – 2:40
14. "Triste" (Jobim) – 2:42
15. "This Happy Madness (Estrada Branca)" (de Moraes, Jobim, Lees) – 2:57
16. "One Note Samba (Samba de Uma Nota So)" (Jobim, Mendonça) – 2:22
17. "Don't Ever Go Away (Por Causa de Você)" (Gilbert, Dolores Duran, Jobim) – 2:30
18. "Wave" (Jobim) – 3:21
19. "Off Key" (Desafinado)" (Lees, Jobim, Mendonça) – 3:09
20. "Bonita" (Gilbert, Jobim, Lees) – 3:40

== Personnel ==
- Frank Sinatra – vocals
- Antônio Carlos Jobim – vocals, guitar
- Claus Ogerman – arranger, conductor (Tracks 1–10)
- Eumir Deodato – arranger (Tracks 11–20)
- Morris Stoloff – conductor (Tracks 11–20)

== See also ==
- Francis Albert Sinatra & Antonio Carlos Jobim (1967)
- Sinatra & Company (1971)
