= List of Brazilian songs =

== A ==
- "A Felicidade"
- "Anna Julia"
- "Agua de Beber (Water to Drink)"
- "Águas de Março (Waters of March)"
- "Aquarela do Brasil"

== B ==
- "Bim-Bom"

== C ==
- "Chega de Saudade (No More Blues)"
- "Cidade Maravilhosa"
- "Corcovado (Quiet Nights of Quiet Stars)"

== D ==
- "Desafinado (Slightly Out of Tune)"
- "Dindi"

== F ==
Forro Dos Cumpadre

== G ==
- "Garota de Ipanema (The Girl from Ipanema)"

== H ==
- "Hino à Bandeira Nacional (Anthem to the National Flag)"
- "Hino da Independência (Anthem to the Independence)
- "Hino Nacional Brasileiro (National Anthem)"

== I ==
- "Insensatez (How Insensitive)"
- "Inútil Paisagem (If You Never Come To Me)"

== M ==
- "Manhã de Carnaval"
- "Mas Que Nada"
- "Meditação (Meditation)"

== N ==
- "Na Baixa do Sapateiro (Bahia)"

== O ==
- "Os Grillos (Crickets Sing For Anamaria)"
- "Os Quindins de Yayá"
- "Outra Vez (Once Again)"

== P ==
Pátria Que Me Pariu (Country that birthed me)

== S ==
- "Samba de Uma Nota Só (One Note Samba)"
- "Samba de Verão (Summer Samba)"
- "Se Todos Fossem Iguais A Você (Someone to Light Up My Life)"

== V ==
- "Vou te Contar (Wave)"

== X ==
- "Xangô"
