= Casa (Morelenbaum²/Sakamoto album) =

Studio album by Jaques Morelenbaum, Paula Morelenbaum and Ryuichi Sakamoto
- Released: September 2001
- Venue: Rio de Janeiro
- Studios: Residence of Antônio Carlos Jobim, Discover Studios, Mega Studios
- Genres: Bossa nova; jazz; classical
- Length: 64:22
- Label: Sony Classical
- Producers: Jaques Morelenbaum, Paula Morelenbaum, Ryuichi Sakamoto

Jaques Morelenbaum, Paula Morelenbaum and Ryuichi Sakamoto chronology
Casa (2001)	Live In Tokyo 2001 (2003)

Professional ratings
Review scores
Source	Rating
AllMusic	4/5 stars

Casa is a 2001 studio album by the trio Morelenbaum²/Sakamoto, consisting of cellist Jaques Morelenbaum, vocalist Paula Morelenbaum, and pianist Ryuichi Sakamoto. It is a tribute to Brazilian musician and composer Antônio Carlos Jobim, with most of the songs recorded in his house in Rio de Janeiro, using his grand piano. Casa featured the first recording ever of Jobim's composition entitled "Tema para Ana." The album was released in the United States by Sony Classical.

== Critical reception ==
Casa has received mostly positive reviews, with a few that were more mixed.

Richard S. Ginell at AllMusic said, "Paula's soft, dusky voice – whether singing in English or Portuguese – is the personification of the Brazilian beach itself, and Jacques' cello amplifies the element of melancholy that runs through much of Jobim. A lovely rendition of ‘Song of the Sabia’ finds Sakamoto hammering out chords that tie the song to the Chopin E minor prelude, and a nicely swinging ‘Bonita’ has sounds of the sea overdubbed."

A BBC review by Nick Reynolds claimed, "this remarkable album reinterprets Antonio Jobim's songs in a quietly radical way. It points up his similarities to classical composers like Debussy and Chopin. But it also brings out a bittersweet sadness at the heart of his music." Reynolds praised, "the deep, dark keening sound of the cello, the twilight voicings of the piano and the perfect, pure pitch of Paula Morelenbaum's creamy voice." He concluded by saying, "This is chamber music of great beauty, which should appeal to both classical music lovers and fans of bossa nova. It's a lovely album."

Jazz critic Neil Tesser, writing in Chicago Reader, said, "Paula Morelenbaum sings in tones of sweet, dark claret, tinged with saudade, the bittersweet melancholy that deepens Brazilian expressions of love and joy; the sparse accompaniment, marked by the sweeping sadness of the cello, complements this quality, and the near total absence of percussion focuses attention on the purity of the melodies, demonstrating their well-earned place not just as pop phenomena but as genuine 20th-century art songs."

Billboard called the album "intimately atmospheric" and said, "with Casa, they have done the world a favor by recording an album of rarely heard songs by bossa nova master Antonio Carlos Jobim." Billboard Editor-in-Chief Timothy White selected Casa as one of the "Best Albums of the Year" for 2001.

Music journalist Ben Ratliff at The New York Times also chose Casa as one of the "10 Best Albums" of the year, and said, "There is something very special about their recent record."

In a more mixed review, Jazziz magazine called the album "disappointingly monochromatic" and said, "Casa fails to capture the restrained, emotional essence of the bossa movement. Sakamoto's piano playing, inspired by the French impressionists, is morose and tortuous in a beautiful way. But the ever-present cello robs these tunes of some much-needed swing. Worse yet, the crystalline vocals of Paula Morelenbaum lack the overwhelming personality that defined Astrud Gilberto, Elis Regina, or Maria Creuza." The review also stated, however, that "a dedicated listener will find plenty of moments to cherish here, including the frolicsome melody of the lesser-known ‘Imagina.’ Some will even call this an excellent recording, and they might be right."

== Track listing ==
All songs written by Antônio Carlos Jobim, except "Improvisation (Morelenbaum, Sakamoto)." Lyricists indicated.

1. "As Praias Desertas" – 3:50
2. "O Amor em Paz" (Vinícius de Moraes) – 3:51
3. "Vivo Sonhando – Dreamer" (Gene Lees) – 4:30
4. "Inútil Paisagem" (Aloysio de Oliveira) – 4:29
5. "Sabiá" (Chico Buarque) – 3:49
6. "Chanson pour Michelle" – 3:10
7. "Bonita" (Lees, Ray Gilbert) – 4:22
8. "Fotografia – Photograph" (Gilbert) – 4:18
9. "Imagina" (Buarque) – 2:18
10. "Estrada Branca" (de Moraes) – 4:02
11. "O Grande Amor" (de Moraes) – 4:30
12. "Canção em Modo Menor" (de Moraes) – 2:00
13. "Tema Para Ana" – 2:07
14. "Derradeira Primavera" (de Moraes) – 2:21
15. "Esperança Perdida – I Was Just One More for You" (Billy Blanco, Gilbert) – 4:04
16. "Sem Você" (de Moraes) – 5:07

Bonus Tracks

1. "Samba do Avião" (Live) – 5:37
2. "Improvisation" (Live) (Jaques Morelenbaum, Ryuichi Sakamoto) – 7:10

== Personnel ==
- Paula Morelenbaum – vocals
- Jaques Morelenbaum – cello
- Ryuichi Sakamoto– piano
- Paulo Jobim – guitar (2,15)
- Ed Motta – vocals (9)
- Luiz Brasil – guitar (3,7,11,17)
- Zeca Assumpcao – bass (2–3,7,11)
- Marcos Suzano – percussion (3,7–8,11)

Production

- Paula Morelenbaum – producer
- Jaques Morelenbaum – producer
- Ryuichi Sakamoto – producer
- Hideki Nakajima – art direction, design
- Tomoko Yoneda – photography
