= Dez Anos Depois =

Studio album by Nara Leão
- Released: 1971
- Recorded: Paris, France; Rio de Janeiro, Brazil
- Studio: Polydor Studios, Companhia Brasileira de Discos
- Genre: Bossa nova; MPB
- Label: Philips
- Producer: Roberto Menescal

Nara Leão chronology
Coisas do Mundo (1969)	Dez Anos Depois (1971)	Meu Primeiro Amor (1974)

Dez Anos Depois (transl. Ten Years Later) is a 1971 double album of bossa nova standards by Brazilian singer Nara Leão.

The first LP is entirely acoustic. The arrangements and accompaniment, made by Brazilian guitarist Tuca, with occasional piano lines, were recorded in France; Nara was living in Paris at the time. The second LP was recorded in Rio; Nara's guitar and vocal were tracked separately from the accompaniment and orchestration, which were done at a studio with arrangers Roberto Menescal, Luiz Eça, and Rogério Duprat.

Professional ratings
Review scores
Source	Rating
Sputnikmusic	4.8/5

== Track listing of the original LP ==
Disc 1

Side A

1. "Insensatez" (Tom Jobim, Vinícius de Moraes)
2. "Samba de uma nota só" (Jobim, Newton Mendonça)
3. "Retrato em branco e preto" (Jobim, Chico Buarque)
4. "Corcovado" (Jobim)
5. "Garota de Ipanema" (Jobim, de Moraes)
6. "Pois é" (Jobim, Buarque)

Side B

1. "Chega de Saudade" (Jobim, de Moraes)
2. "Bonita" (Jobim, Gene Lees, Ray Gilbert)
3. "Você e eu" (Carlos Lyra, de Moraes)
4. "Fotografia" (Jobim)
5. "O grande amor" (Jobim, de Moraes)
6. "Estrada do sol" (Jobim, Dolores Duran)

Disc 2

Side A

1. "Por toda minha vida" (Jobim, de Moraes)
2. "Desafinado" (Jobim, Mendonça)
3. "Minha namorada" (Lyra, de Moraes)
4. "Rapaz de bem" (Johnny Alf)
5. "Vou por aí" (Baden Powell, Aloysio de Oliveira)
6. "O amor em paz" (Jobim, de Moraes)

Side B

1. "Sabiá" (Jobim, Buarque)
2. "Meditação" (Jobim, Mendonça)
3. "Primavera" (Lyra, de Moraes)
4. "Este seu olhar" (Jobim)
5. "Outra vez" (Jobim)
6. "Demais" (Jobim, de Oliveira)

== See also ==
- La question - an album by French singer Françoise Hardy, produced by Tuca, with an extremely similar atmosphere. It also has very a stripped-back production style.
