= Fotografia (Antônio Carlos Jobim song) =

1959 song by Antônio Carlos Jobim

"Fotografia" (also known as "Photograph") is a bossa nova song written and composed in 1959 by Antônio Carlos Jobim. English lyrics were published in 1965 by Ray Gilbert.

== Background ==
"Fotografia" was one of Jobim's first compositions for which he wrote the words as well as the music. According to author Ruy Castro, this came about partly because Jobim's songwriting partner, Vinicius de Moraes, had left Rio de Janeiro to take up a diplomatic post in Montevideo, Uruguay, during much of 1958 and 1959. The change allowed Jobim to work with other lyricists, such as close friend Newton Mendonça, Dolores Duran and Aloísio de Oliveira, and to try his hand at penning his own lyrics.

Jazz critic Gary Giddins, writing in The New Yorker, referred to "Fotografia" as an "ingenious" composition full of "flirtatious romance," while Mark Holston at Jazziz Magazine said the song was "mesmerizing." Thom Jurek at AllMusic called it "a tome of memory and longing."

Brazilian vocalist Flora Purim, who recorded "Fotografia" on her 2001 album Perpetual Emotion, discussed the background of the song in an interview on National Public Radio, saying, "in Brazil it's very common, all those illegal love affairs, people that are married but fall in love with other people that are married. So they would meet in the afternoon and be together until sunset, and then they'd have to go home to their families. And this song talks about a romance between two people and suddenly that kiss, you know, that goodbye kiss, 'I have to go now.' It's a song about forbidden love. . . . about love affairs in the late afternoon."

"Fotografia" has been used as the title of other Jobim-related albums, including Wanda Sá's 2014 Jobim tribute album, and a 2005 compilation from Planet Rhythm (Universal) entitled Fotografia: Os Años Dourados de Tom Jobim that includes rarities, outtakes, and previously unreleased tracks.

The first recording of "Fotografia" was by Sylvia Telles in 1959, on her album Amor De Gente Moça (Musicas De Antonio Carlos Jobim).

Jobim recorded the song himself as an English-language vocal on his 1967 album, A Certain Mr. Jobim.

== Recorded versions ==
- Sylvia Telles – Amor de Gente Moça (Musicas de Antonio Carlos Jobim) (1959)
- Astrud Gilberto – The Astrud Gilberto Album (1965)
- Antônio Carlos Jobim – A Certain Mr. Jobim (1967)
- Dick Farney – Dick Farney: Piano Orquestra: Gaya (1967); Dick Farney (1973)
- Nara Leão – Dez Anos Depois (1971)
- Elis Regina & Antônio Carlos Jobim – Elis & Tom (1974)
- Ella Fitzgerald – Ella Abraça Jobim (1981)
- Rosa Passos – Curare (1991)
- João Gilberto – Eu Sei que Vou Te Amar (1994)
- Joe Henderson – Double Rainbow: The Music of Antonio Carlos Jobim (1995)
- Gal Costa – Gal Costa Canta Tom Jobim Ao Vivo (1999)
- Dave Liebman Group – The Unknown Jobim (2001)
- Jaques Morelenbaum, Paula Morelenbaum, and Ryuichi Sakamoto – Casa (2001), A Day in New York (2003)
- Flora Purim – Perpetual Emotion (2001)
- Claudia Telles – Tributo a Tom Jobim (2001)
- Palmyra & Levita with João Donato – Here's That Rainy Bossa Day (2002)
- Eliane Elias – Dreamer (2004)
- Antonio Adolfo & Carol Saboya – Ao Vivo Live (2006)
- Lisa Ono – Music Of Antonio Carlos Jobim: Ipanema (2007)
- Mark Murphy – Lucky to Be Me (2010)
- Vanessa da Mata – Vanessa da Mata canta Tom Jobim (2013)
- Wanda Sá – Photograph: The Song Of Antonio Carlos Jobim (2014)
- Stacey Kent – I Know I Dream – The Orchestral Sessions (2017)
