= Forro =

The word forro could refer to:

- The Forro people, an ethnic group in São Tomé and Príncipe
- The Forro Creole, spoken by the Forro people
- Forró, a style of music and dance from northeastern Brazil
- Forró, a village in Hungary
- Gyula Forró, Hungarian Footballer
- Krisztián Forró, Slovak politician
- Forro in the Dark, New York based band
- Forró dos Cumpadre, song from Brazil
- Madeliene Barnothy Forro, Hungarian footballer
- Forró mezök, movie
