= Ella Abraça Jobim =

Studio album by Ella Fitzgerald
- Released: 1981
- Recorded: September 17–19, 1980, March 18–20, 1981 Hollywood, Los Angeles
- Genre: Jazz, bossa nova
- Length: 74:31
- Label: Pablo Today
- Producer: Norman Granz

Ella Fitzgerald chronology
A Perfect Match (1979)	Ella Abraça Jobim (1981)	The Best Is Yet to Come (1982)

Professional ratings
Review scores
Source	Rating
AllMusic	3/5 stars
The Penguin Guide to Jazz Recordings	2.5/4 stars
The Rolling Stone Jazz Record Guide	3/5 stars

Ella Abraça Jobim or Ella Fitzgerald Sings the Antonio Carlos Jobim Song Book is a 1981 studio album by Ella Fitzgerald, devoted to the songs of Antônio Carlos Jobim.

It was reissued on CD in 1991, although the CD version does not include the songs "Don't Ever Go Away" and "Song of the Jet".

Though it is subtitled as such, the album is not usually considered part of Fitzgerald's Song Book series, the last of the Song Book albums having been recorded in 1964.

It was Fitzgerald's first album of music devoted to a single composer since 1972's Ella Loves Cole, and it was her only album recorded entirely in the bossa nova style, though she had been singing Jobim's songs since the mid-1960s.

Fitzgerald never worked with Antônio Carlos Jobim, though she appeared alongside Frank Sinatra for a 1967 television special that also featured Jobim.

The title has a pun, as Ela (with a single l) translates as "she". It can be translated as 'She Hugs Jobim' (Ela Abraça Jobim) or 'Ella Hugs Jobim".

== Track listing ==
1. "Somewhere in the Hills (Favela)" (Vinícius de Moraes, Ray Gilbert) – 3:56
2. "The Girl from Ipanema (Garota de Ipanema)" (de Moraes, Norman Gimbel) – 3:50
3. "Dindi" (Ray Gilbert, Aloysio Oliveira) – 6:37
4. "Off Key (Desafinado)" (Newton Mendonça, Gene Lees) – 3:41
5. "Water to Drink (Água de Beber)" (de Moraes, Gimbel) – 2:44
6. "Dreamer (Vivo Sonhando)" (Lees) – 4:55
7. "Quiet Nights of Quiet Stars (Corcovado)" (Lees) – 5:40
8. "Bonita" (Gilbert, Lees) – 2:50
9. "One Note Samba (Samba de Uma Nota Só)" (Mendonça, Hendricks) – 3:51
10. "Don't Ever Go Away (Por Causa de Você)" (Gilbert, Dolores Duran) - 2:52
11. "Triste" – 4:07
12. "How Insensitive (Insensatez)" (de Moraes, Gimbel) – 3:00
13. "He's a Carioca (Ela é Carioca)" (de Moraes, Gilbert) – 5:14
14. "This Love That I've Found (Só Tinha de Ser com Você)" (Oliveira) – 5:17
15. "A Felicidade" (de Moraes) – 2:19
16. "Wave" – 5:22
17. "Song of the Jet (Samba do Avião)" (Lees) – 3:40
18. "Photograph (Fotografia)" (Gilbert) – 3:49
19. "Useless Landscape (Inútil Paisagem)" (Gilbert, Oliveira) – 7:59

All songs composed by Antônio Carlos Jobim, with lyricists indicated.

== Personnel ==
- Ella Fitzgerald - Vocals
- Clark Terry - Trumpet
- Zoot Sims - Tenor Saxophone
- Toots Thielemans - Harmonica
- Henry Trotter - Keyboards
- Mike Lang - Keyboards
- Clarence McDonald - Keyboards
- Joe Pass - Electric guitar (soloist)
- Oscar Castro-Neves - Acoustic guitar (soloist)
- Paul Jackson, Jr. - Rhythm guitar
- Mitch Holder - Rhythm guitar
- Roland Bautista - Rhythm guitar
- Abraham Laboriel - Double Bass
- Alex Acuña - Drums
- Paulinho da Costa - Percussion
- Erich Bulling - Song arrangements and conductor

== Credits ==
- Produced by Norman Granz
- Associate producer - Paulinho da Costa
- Recording – Humberto Gatica, Paul Aronoff
- Percussion overdub and remix – Allen Sides
- Mastering - Bernie Grundman (US) & Greg Fulginiti (International)
