= Sabiá (song) =

"Sabiá" (also known as "The Song of the Sabiá") is a Brazilian song composed in 1968 by Antônio Carlos Jobim, with lyrics by Chico Buarque. English-language lyrics were written later by Norman Gimbel.

In 1968, "Sabiá" won first place at Brazil’s III Festival Internacional da Canção (International Festival of Song), where it was performed by Cynara and Cybele. After Buarque wrote the original lyrics, he traveled to Italy, and, while he was away, Jobim added a last verse, which was included in the performance at the Festival but was not well received. Buarque convinced Jobim to drop the verse, and it has not been used since.

The sabiá is a songbird (Rufous-bellied thrush in English) and the national bird of Brazil. Buarque's lyrics allude to the sabiá in the famous Brazilian poem "Canção do exílio", written in 1843 by Gonçalves Dias.

== Sinatra & Jobim recording ==
In 1969, Frank Sinatra and Jobim recorded "The Song of the Sabiá" for an album entitled Sinatra-Jobim, but at the last minute, Sinatra stopped release of the record. Seven of the ten songs from those sessions were released in 1971 as Side A of Sinatra & Company, but "The Song of the Sabiá" was not used. It appeared as the B-side of Sinatra's single "Lady Day" (Reprise 0970) in December 1970, and was later included on Portrait of Sinatra – Forty Songs from the Life of a Man (1977), Sinatra–Jobim Sessions (1979) and Sinatra/Jobim: The Complete Reprise Recordings (2010).

In his book, Sinatra! The Song Is You: A Singer's Art, music critic Will Friedwald questions why "Sabiá" was ever left off the original album, calling it "a soft, mystical piece on the order of the first album's 'Dindi'.... revealing Jobim as a Brazilian Billy Strayhorn." He says that trombonist Milt Bernhart, who was on the session and had recorded with Sinatra many times dating back to 1953, thought "Sabiá" was "one of the most gorgeous things he ever heard Sinatra sing."

Charles L. Granata included "Song of the Sabiá" in his list of "Fifty Songs that Define the Essence of Sinatra" in his book Sessions with Sinatra: Frank Sinatra and the Art of Recording (Chicago Review Press, 1999).

== Other recorded versions ==
- Chico Buarque - Não Vai Passar (rec. 1968, released in 1990)
- Clara Nunes - Você passa eu acho graça (1968)
- Françoise Hardy - Françoise Hardy (1968)- as "La mésange"
- Frank Sinatra & Antônio Carlos Jobim - Sinatra/Jobim: The Complete Reprise Recordings (rec. 1969, released 2010)
- Antônio Carlos Jobim - Stone Flower (1970), Terra Brasilis (1980), and Inédito (rec. 1987, released 1995)
- Nara Leão - Dez Anos Depois (1971)
- Cedar Walton/Hank Mobley Quintet - Breakthrough! (1972)
- Elis Regina - Saudade do Brasil (1980)
- Billy Higgins - Once More (1980)
- Cedar Walton - The Maestro (1981)
- Gal Costa & Antônio Carlos Jobim - Jazzvisions: Rio Revisited (1987)
- Eliane Elias - Eliane Elias Plays Jobim (1990)
- Susannah McCorkle - Sabia (1990)
- Jaques Morelenbaum, Paula Morelenbaum, and Ryuichi Sakamoto - Morelenbaum 2/Sakamoto: A Day in New York (2003)
