= A Day in New York =

Studio album by Jaques Morelenbaum, Paula Morelenbaum, Ryuichi Sakamoto
- Released: May 27, 2003
- Recorded: November 7, 2002
- Studios: The Hit Factory, New York
- Genres: Bossa nova, Jazz
- Length: 45:18
- Label: Sony

Professional ratings
Review scores
Source	Rating
AllMusic	4/5 stars

A Day in New York is a 2003 studio album by the trio Morelenbaum²/Sakamoto, consisting of Jaques Morelenbaum, Paula Morelenbaum, and Ryuichi Sakamoto. The album was recorded live in the studio and featured songs they had been performing together on the 2002 tour for their previous album, Casa, a tribute to Antônio Carlos Jobim.

== Track listing ==
No.	Title	Writer(s)	Length
1.	"Desafinado"	Antônio Carlos Jobim, Newton Mendonça	4:03
2.	"Bim Bom"	João Gilberto	2:13
3.	"Insensatez"	Antônio Carlos Jobim, Vinicius de Moraes	4:21
4.	"Coração Vagabundo"	Caetano Veloso	4:11
5.	"Falando de Amor"	Antônio Carlos Jobim	3:50
6.	"Chora Coração"	Antônio Carlos Jobim, Vinicius de Moraes	3:50
7.	"Sabiá"	Antônio Carlos Jobim, Chico Buarque	4:56
8.	"Tango" (Versão em Português)	Sakamoto, T. Onuki	5:36
9.	"Chega de Saudade"	Antônio Carlos Jobim, Vinicius de Moraes	3:16
10.	"Samba do Avião"	Antônio Carlos Jobim	4:49
11.	"Fotografia"	Antônio Carlos Jobim	4:33

== Personnel ==
- Ryuichi Sakamoto – piano
- Jaques Morelenbaum – cello
- Paula Morelenbaum – vocals
- Luiz Brasil – guitar
- Marcelo Costa – drums, percussions
