= Sinatra & Company =

Studio album by Frank Sinatra
- Released: 1971
- Recorded: February 11, 1969 – October 29, 1970; Hollywood
- Genres: Traditional pop, bossa nova
- Length: 40:03
- Labels: Reprise; FS 1033
- Producers: Sonny Burke (tracks:1 to 7), Don Costa (tracks: 8 to 14)

Frank Sinatra chronology
Watertown (1970)	Sinatra & Company (1971)	Frank Sinatra's Greatest Hits, Vol. 2 (1972)

SinatraJobim
- The original artwork

Professional ratings
Review scores
Source	Rating
Allmusic	3.5/5 stars
Mojo	2/5 stars

Sinatra & Company is an album by American singer Frank Sinatra released in 1971.

The first side of this album is in the bossa nova style, and the second side is influenced by soft rock, featuring two songs from John Denver.

The bossa nova recordings were originally cut for a follow-up to the widely acclaimed Francis Albert Sinatra & Antonio Carlos Jobim. Arranged by Eumir Deodato, the recordings had been completed, the artwork finalized, and an 8-track tape release of the planned album, titled Sinatra–Jobim, briefly made available when the decision was made to retrench. Some of Sinatra's less mainstream albums hadn't performed well, and anxieties drove the creation of this hybrid.

Three songs recorded at the Sinatra-Jobim session – "Bonita", "Sabiá", and "Off Key (Desafinado)" – were omitted from Sinatra & Company. "Sabiá" was released in the US as the flip side of the 45 rpm single "Lady Day" (Reprise 0970) in 1970, and was included on the 1970 Warner/Reprise Loss Leaders sampler Schlagers!, as well as being issued along with "Bonita" on the 1977 compilation Portrait of Sinatra and the 1979 compilation, Sinatra–Jobim Sessions . "Off Key (Desafinado)" was unreleased until its inclusion on the box set The Complete Reprise Studio Recordings in 1995. In 2010 the Concord Records label issued Sinatra–Jobim: The Complete Reprise Recordings, a comprehensive collection of all the tracks recorded by Sinatra and Jobim.

A few 8-track versions of Sinatra–Jobim did survive, and are now eagerly sought after by collectors.

In the song "Wave," Sinatra repeatedly hits a low E flat, the lowest note he ever recorded.

== Track listing ==
1. "Drinking Water" (Vinicius de Moraes, Antônio Carlos Jobim, Norman Gimbel) – 2:35
2. "Someone to Light Up My Life" (de Moraes, Jobim, Gene Lees) – 2:37
3. "Triste" (Jobim) – 2:40
4. "Don't Ever Go Away (Por Causa de Você)" (Ray Gilbert, Dolores Durán, Jobim) – 2:28
5. "This Happy Madness (Estrada Branca)" (de Moraes, Jobim, Lees) – 2:57
6. "Wave" (Jobim) – 3:25
7. "One Note Samba (Samba de uma Nota Só)" (Jobim, Newton Mendonça, Jon Hendricks) – 2:20
8. "I Will Drink the Wine" (Paul Ryan) – 3:30
9. "(They Long to Be) Close to You" (Burt Bacharach, Hal David) – 2:34
10. "Sunrise in the Morning" (Ryan) – 2:50
11. "Bein' Green" (Joe Raposo) – 3:00
12. "My Sweet Lady" (John Denver) – 3:01
13. "Leaving on a Jet Plane" (John Denver) – 2:25
14. "Lady Day" (Bob Gaudio, Jake Holmes) – 3:41

== Charts ==
Chart (1971)	Peak position
Australia (Kent Music Report)	23
