= This Happy Madness =

1958 Antônio Carlos Jobim song

Song by Elizeth Cardoso

from the album Canção do Amor Demais
- Released: 1958
- Genre: bossa nova
- Length: 2:27
- Label: Festa
- Composer: Antônio Carlos Jobim
- Lyricist: Vinícius de Moraes

"This Happy Madness" or "Estrada Branca" (Portuguese for "white road") is a bossa nova song composed in 1958 by Antônio Carlos Jobim with lyrics by Vinícius de Moraes. English-language lyrics were added later by Gene Lees.

According to Jobim's sister, Helena, he composed "Estrada Branca" in their parents’ home in the village of Poço Fundo, and it was one of several songs inspired by the rain.

Gene Lees, who wrote the English lyrics, said, "The melody is one of Antonio Carlos Jobim’s early ones, and the song is, again, very difficult to sing." Music writer Doug Ramsey praised Lees' work on the song: "'This Happy Madness' is one of the finest sets of lyrics to grace a Jobim song in any language."

The first recording of the song was in April 1958 by Elizete Cardoso for her album Canção do Amor Demais, which bossa nova historian Ruy Castro says "inaugurated the bossa nova sound."

== Recorded versions ==
- Elizete Cardoso - Canção do Amor Demais (1958)-resissue in 1999.
- Lenita Bruno – Por Tôda Minha Vida (1959)-reissue in 2006.
- Alaíde Costa - Gosto de Você (1959)
- Frank Sinatra - Sinatra & Company (rec. 1969, released in 1971)
- Dexter Gordon - More Than You Know (1975) - with vocal by Dexter Gordon
- Antônio Carlos Jobim - Terra Brasilis (1980)
- Carlos Barbosa-Lima - Carlos Barbosa-Lima Plays Jobim & Gershwin (1982)
- Joe Henderson - Double Rainbow: The Music of Antonio Carlos Jobim (1995)
- Edu Lobo - Meia Noite (1995)
- Kenny Rankin - Here in My Heart (1997)
- Carol Saboya & Nelson Faria - Interpretam Canções de Antônio Carlos Jobim (1999)
- Jaques Morelenbaum, Paula Morelenbaum, and Ryuichi Sakamoto - Casa (2001)
- Phil Woods & Barbara Casini, with Stefano Bollani - Você e Eu (2001)
- Chico Buarque - Olha Que Coisa Mais Linda: Uma Homenagem a Tom Jobim (2004)
- Karrin Allyson - Imagina: Songs of Brasil (2008)
- Diana Panton - To Brazil with Love (2011)
- Stacey Kent - The Changing Lights (2013)
- Maria Schafer - To Know Love (2018)
