= Bonita (Antônio Carlos Jobim song) =

1963 song by Antônio Carlos Jobim

"Bonita" (meaning "Pretty" in English) is a bossa nova song composed by Antônio Carlos Jobim, with lyrics in English credited to Gene Lees and Ray Gilbert.

== Background ==
According to Brazilian author Ruy Castro, Jobim composed the song in 1963, after being inspired by "a young woman, Candice Bergen, whom he had the pleasure of meeting at the home of the president of Atlantic Records, Nesuhi Ertegun. The pleasure, by the way, was mutual."

Jobim made the first recording of the song in 1965, for his album, The Wonderful World of Antonio Carlos Jobim. In 1969, Frank Sinatra performed the song with Jobim for their planned album SinatraJobim, but at the last minute, Sinatra stopped release of the record. Seven of the ten songs from those sessions were eventually released as Side A of Sinatra & Company (1971), but "Bonita" was not included. It finally appeared in 1977 on a Reprise UK album entitled, Portrait of Sinatra – Forty Songs from the Life of a Man, and was later included on Sinatra–Jobim Sessions (1979) and Sinatra/Jobim: The Complete Reprise Recordings (2010).

Gene Lees, who had written several other English-language lyrics for Jobim, claims that "Jobim gave my lyric to Bonita, which I had written in New York, to Ray Gilbert, who altered a phrase or two and put his name on it. If you look at the credits on the back of the album titled The Wonderful World of Antonio Carlos Jobim ... you'll find that the writer credit on Bonita reads Jobim/Gilbert. Gilbert produced an album for Warner Brothers in which he again used the song, again taking credit for the lyric.... I was furious at both records and took the matter up with the American Guild of Authors and Composers. A hearing was organized, with Sheldon Harnick as its chairman, and I presented the evidence of my authorship. The committee ruled that it was indeed my lyric, solely or largely.... The contretemps over Bonita was one of the reasons I parted company with Jobim."

== Recorded versions ==
- Antônio Carlos Jobim - The Wonderful World of Antonio Carlos Jobim (1965), and A Certain Mr. Jobim (1967)
- Sérgio Mendes - The Great Arrival (1966)
- Sylvia Telles - Sylvia Telles Sings The Wonderful Songs Of Antonio Carlos Jobim (1966)
- Stanley Turrentine - The Return of the Prodigal Son (rec. 1967, released 2008)
- Roy Ayers - Daddy Bug (1969)
- Frank Sinatra & Antônio Carlos Jobim - Sinatra/Jobim: The Complete Reprise Recordings (rec. 1969, released 2010)
- Nara Leão - Dez Anos Depois (1971)
- Elis Regina & Antônio Carlos Jobim - Elis & Tom: 30th Anniversary Edition (1974) - bonus track
- Sarah Vaughan - Copacabana (1979)
- Ella Fitzgerald - Ella Abraça Jobim (1981)
- Mongo Santamaría - Brazilian Sunset (rec. 1992, released 1996)
- Gal Costa - Gal Costa Canta Tom Jobim Ao Vivo (1999)
- Ivan Lins - Jobiniando (2001)
- Jaques Morelenbaum, Paula Morelenbaum, and Ryuichi Sakamoto - Morelenbaum 2/Sakamoto: Casa (2001)
- Eliane Elias - Love Stories (2019)
