= Come Fly Away (album) =

Compilation album by Frank Sinatra
- Released: March 6, 2010
- Recorded: 1950s–1984
- Genre: Vocal jazz; traditional pop; classical
- Label: Reprise Records

Frank Sinatra chronology
36 Greatest Hits! (2010)	Come Fly Away (2010)	Sinatra/Jobim: The Complete Reprise Recordings (2010)

Come Fly Away is a 2010 compilation album by Frank Sinatra. These 16 songs have been chosen to be in the album that were taken from the Broadway musical Come Fly Away.

== Track listing ==
1. "Moonlight Becomes You" (Johnny Burke, Jimmy Van Heusen)
2. "I've Got the World on a String" (Harold Arlen, Ted Koehler)
3. "Let's Fall in Love" (Arlen, Koehler)
4. "Yes Sir, That's My Baby" (Walter Donaldson, Gus Kahn)
5. "Witchcraft" (Cy Coleman, Carolyn Leigh)
6. "Lean Baby" (Roy Alfred, Billy May)
7. "Nice 'n' Easy" (Lew Spence, Alan and Marilyn Bergman)
8. "Just Friends" (John Klenner, Sam M. Lewis)
9. "Pick Yourself Up" (Jerome Kern, Dorothy Fields)
10. "Wave" (Antônio Carlos Jobim)
11. "Let's Face the Music and Dance" (Irving Berlin)
12. "Summer Wind" (Heinz Meier, Hans Bradtke, Johnny Mercer)
13. "Body and Soul" (Frank Eyton, Johnny Green, Edward Heyman, Robert Sour)
14. "The September of My Years" (Sammy Cahn, Van Heusen)
15. "My Way" (Paul Anka, Claude François, Jacques Revaux, Gilles Thibaut)
16. "Theme from New York, New York" (Fred Ebb, John Kander)
