= A Certain Mr. Jobim =

Studio album by Antônio Carlos Jobim
- Released: August 1967
- Recorded: 1967
- Genre: Bossa nova
- Length: 26:34
- Label: Warner Bros.
- Producers: George Lee and Ray Gilbert

Antônio Carlos Jobim chronology
Francis Albert Sinatra & Antonio Carlos Jobim (1967)	A Certain Mr. Jobim (1967)	Wave (1967)

Professional ratings
Review scores
Source	Rating
Allmusic	3.5/5 stars
The Rolling Stone Jazz Record Guide	2/5 stars

A Certain Mr. Jobim is the fourth album by Antônio Carlos Jobim. It was released in 1967 and was number 14 on the US Jazz Albums 1968 year-end chart.

== Track listing ==
All tracks are written by Antônio Carlos Jobim, except where noted.

No.	Title	Writer(s)	Length
1.	"Bonita"	Jobim, Gene Lees, Ray Gilbert	2:58
2.	"Se Todos Fossem Iguais a Você"	Jobim, Vinicius de Moraes	2:18
3.	"Off-Key (Desafinado)"	Jobim, Lees, Newton Mendonça	3:08
4.	"Photograph"	Jobim, Gilbert	2:12
5.	"Surfboard"		2:48
6.	"Outra Vez ("Once Again")"		2:09
7.	"I Was Just One More for You ("Esperança Perdida")"	Jobim, Billy Blanco, Gilbert	2:26
8.	"Estrada do Sol"	Antônio Carlos Jobim, Dolores Duran	3:31
9.	"Por Causa de Você (Don't Ever Go Away)"	Jobim, Duran, Gilbert	2:48
10.	"Zingaro"		2:16

== Personnel ==
- Antônio Carlos Jobim – piano, guitar, organ, vocals
- Claus Ogerman – arranger/conductor
- Dom Um Romão – drums
- George Lee and Ray Gilbert – producers
