= Kinda Latin =

1966 studio album by Cliff Richard

Studio album by Cliff Richard
- Released: May 1966
- Recorded: October 1965
- Studio: EMI Abbey Road
- Genre: Traditional pop, bossa nova
- Label: Columbia - SCX 6039
- Producer: Norrie Paramor

Cliff Richard chronology
Love is Forever (1965)	Kinda Latin (1966)	Finders Keepers (1966)

Kinda Latin is the tenth studio album by Cliff Richard, released in 1966. It is his seventeenth album overall. The album reached number 9 in the UK Album Charts in a 12 week run in the top 30.

== Reception ==
Professional ratings
Review scores
Source	Rating
AllMusic	4.5/5 stars
Record Mirror	4/5 stars

The album was reviewed by Dave Thompson at AllMusic who wrote that "It's a terrific album, and no mistake". Thompson felt that in comparison to his albums recorded in Italian and Spanish, "Left to his own English language devices, however, Richard's natural vocal powers can scarcely be faulted - even the most practiced rehearsal can sound like an ad lib, and it doesn't matter how many times you catch that chuckle at the end of "Blame It on the Bossa Nova," it still seems as natural as breathing".

== Track listing ==
1. "Blame It on the Bossa Nova" (Cynthia Weil, Barry Mann)
2. "Blowin' In the Wind" (Bob Dylan)
3. "Quiet Nights of Quiet Stars" (Antonio Carlos Jobim, Gene Lees)
4. "Eso Beso" (Noel Sherman, Joe Sherman)
5. "The Girl from Ipanema" (Jobim, Norman Gimbel)
6. "One Note Samba" (Jobim, Jon Hendricks)
7. "Fly Me to the Moon (In Other Words)" (Bart Howard)
8. "Our Day Will Come" (Bob Hilliard, Mort Garson)
9. "Quando, Quando, Quando" (Tony Renis, Emilio Pericoli, Alberto Testa)
10. "Come Closer to Me" (Osvaldo Farrés, Al Stewart)
11. "Meditation" (Jobim, Gimbel)
12. "Concrete and Clay" (Tommy Moeller, Brian Parker)
