= Canção do Amor Demais =

Studio album by Elizete Cardoso
- Released: 1958
- Recorded: 1958
- Genre: Bossa nova
- Label: Festa

Professional ratings
Review scores
Source	Rating
PopMatters	7/10 stars

Canção do Amor Demais is a 1958 album by Elizete Cardoso. It is often considered the first bossa nova album, and contains the first recordings of João Gilberto's guitar beat, which became a staple of bossa nova. Gilberto played guitar on "Chega de Saudade" and "Outra Vez".

The music was composed by Vinícius de Moraes and Tom Jobim. Despite its historical importance, and although it was noticed by prominent people in the recording industry, the album's commercial impact was limited. It was released on the small Festa label, which had previously primarily made recordings featuring spoken poetry, and only two thousand copies were initially pressed. Cardoso was already recognized as one of the best singers Brazil had produced, but was not usually classified as a bossa singer; she was later featured on the legendary Black Orpheus soundtrack, another bossa landmark. The album was reissued in 1999.

The album was listed by Rolling Stone Brazil as one of the 100 best Brazilian albums in history.

== Track listing ==
1. Chega de Saudade
2. Serenata do Adeus
3. As Praias Desertas
4. Caminho de Pedra
5. Luciana
6. Janelas Abertas
7. Eu Não Existo Sem Você
8. Outra Vez
9. Medo de Amar
10. Estrada Branca
11. Vida Bela
12. Modinha
13. Canção do Amor Demais

Tracks #2 and #9 by Vinicius de Moraes, #3 and #8 by Tom Jobim. All other tracks by Tom Jobim/Vinicius de Moraes.

== Performer credits ==
- Elizete Cardoso - vocal
- Antonio Carlos Jobim - arrangements, direction, and piano
- João Gilberto - guitar
- Irany Pinto - violin and conductor
- Nicolino Copia (Copinha) - flute
- Gaúcho & Maciel - trombones
- Herbert - trumpet
- Vidal - bass
- Juquinha - drums
- Seven violins, two violas, and two cellos, unidentified
- J. Gilberto, A.C. Jobim, and Walter Santos - chorus on "Chega de Saudade"
