= Double Rainbow: The Music of Antonio Carlos Jobim =

1995 studio album by Joe Henderson

Studio album by Joe Henderson
- Released: 1995
- Recorded: September 19–20 & November 5–6, 1994
- Genre: Jazz
- Length: 62:25
- Label: Verve
- Producer: Oscar Castro-Neves & Richard Seidel

Joe Henderson chronology
So Near, So Far (Musings for Miles) (1993)	Double Rainbow: The Music of Antonio Carlos Jobim (1995)	Big Band (1996)

Double Rainbow: The Music of Antonio Carlos Jobim is a 1995 album by jazz saxophonist Joe Henderson, released on Verve Records. It contains Henderson's arrangements of music by Brazilian composer Antonio Carlos Jobim.

The album was originally intended to be a collaboration between Henderson and Jobim, but the plan was changed following Jobim's death. Musicians include pianists Eliane Elias and Herbie Hancock, bassist Christian McBride and drummer Jack DeJohnette.

== Reception ==
Professional ratings
Review scores
Source	Rating
AllMusic	4.5/5 stars
The Penguin Guide to Jazz Recordings	3/4 stars

Like his previous two albums for Verve Records, Double Rainbow received excellent reviews and relatively good sales for a jazz album in 1995. Reviewer Scott Yanow called the album "very accessible yet unpredictable". The Penguin Guide to Jazz awarded the album three stars and described it as "essentially high-calibre light-jazz".

== Track listing ==
All compositions are by Antonio Carlos Jobim.

1. "Felicidade" – 4:45
2. "Dreamer" – 5:24
3. "Boto" – 6:35
4. "Ligia" – 4:31
5. "Once I Loved" – 5:22
6. "Triste" – 5:28
7. "Photograph" – 5:01
8. "Portrait in Black and White (A.K.A. Zingaro)" – 5:17
9. "No More Blues" – 6:39
10. "Happy Madness" – 3:12
11. "Passarim" – 5:38
12. "Modinha" – 4:33

== Personnel ==
- Joe Henderson – tenor saxophone
- Eliane Elias – piano (tracks 1–4)
- Herbie Hancock – piano (tracks 6–11)
- Oscar Castro-Neves – guitar (tracks 1, 2, 5)
- Nico Assumpção – bass (tracks 1–4)
- Christian McBride – bass (tracks 6–9, 11, 12)
- Paulo Braga – drums (tracks 1–4)
- Jack DeJohnette – drums (tracks 6–7, 9, 11)
