= O Amor, o Sorriso e a Flor =

Studio album by João Gilberto
- Released: 1960
- Genre: Bossa nova
- Length: 21:03
- Label: Odeon
- Producer: Aloysio de Oliveira

João Gilberto chronology
Chega de Saudade (1959)	O Amor, o Sorriso e a Flor (1960)	Getz/Gilberto (1964)

O Amor, o Sorriso e a Flor is a studio album by João Gilberto, released in Brazil in the Odeon label in 1960. The Portuguese title translates to The Love, the Smile and the Flower and is taken from the original lyrics of Antônio Carlos Jobim and Newton Mendonça's "Meditação", which is included in the album.

The album was released almost simultaneously in the United States in 1960 as Brazil's Brilliant João Gilberto (Capitol ST 10280).

Richard S. Ginell, writing in AllMusic, says, "This vitally important record introduced João Gilberto, Antonio Carlos Jobim and thus, bossa nova to the United States in 1961, a year before Stan Getz scored a hit with "Desafinado.... Several Jobim standards-in-waiting -- "One Note Samba," "Corcovado," "Meditation," "Outra Vez"—were heard for the first time in North America on this LP."

== Track listing ==
#	Title	Songwriters	Length
1.	"Samba de Uma Nota Só"	Antônio Carlos Jobim, Newton Mendonça	1:38
2.	"Doralice"	Antônio Almeida, Dorival Caymmi	1:27
3.	"Só em Teus Braços"	Antônio Carlos Jobim	1:48
4.	"Trevo de Quatro Folhas" (I'm Looking Over a Four Leaf Clover	Mort Dixon, Harry M. Woods, Nilo Sérgio	1:23
5.	"Se é Tarde, Me Perdoa"	Carlos Lyra, Ronaldo Bôscoli	1:45
6.	"Um Abraço no Bonfá"	João Gilberto	1:36
7.	"Meditação"	Antônio Carlos Jobim, Newton Mendonça	1:46
8.	"O Pato"	Jayme Silva, Neuza Teixeira	2:00
9.	"Corcovado"	Antônio Carlos Jobim	1:56
10.	"Discussão"	Antônio Carlos Jobim, Newton Mendonça	1:49
11.	"Amor Certinho"	Roberto Guimarães	1:52
12.	"Outra Vez"	Antônio Carlos Jobim	1:51

== Credits ==
- Artwork - César Gomes Villela
- Photography - Francisco Pereira
- Producer - Aloysio de Oliveira
