= Once I Loved =

1960 bossa nova jazz standard

Song by Agostinho dos Santos

from the album Agostinho Sempre Agostinho
- Language: Portuguese
- English title: Once I Loved
- Written: 1960
- Released: 1960
- Genre: Bossa nova
- Length: 2:51
- Label: RGE
- Composer: Antônio Carlos Jobim
- Lyricist: Vinícius de Moraes

"Once I Loved" ("O Amor Em Paz") is a bossa nova and jazz standard composed in 1960 by Antônio Carlos Jobim, with lyrics by Vinícius de Moraes. Words in English were later added by Ray Gilbert. In a few early cases, the song was also known as "Love in Peace", a translation into English of the original Portuguese title.

The first recording was in 1960 by Agostinho dos Santos, followed by João Gilberto's version on his self-titled album João Gilberto (Brasil, Odeon 3202). Jobim recorded an instrumental version of the song in 1963 on his debut album, The Composer of Desafinado Plays.

In The Jazz Standards: A Guide to the Repertoire, jazz critic Ted Gioia credits Frank Sinatra and his version with Jobim on their joint album Francis Albert Sinatra & Antonio Carlos Jobim for the popularity of the song. "Even during the height of the bossa nova craze, which peaked around 1964-65, 'Once I Loved' was not widely known and it is conspicuously missing from most of the bossa nova theme albums of the day. But after Sinatra's 1967 recording, the song became one of Jobim's best-known and most-covered compositions."

Describing the uniqueness of the song, Gioia writes, "[T]here are a handful of songs in the standard repertoire that convey a sense of introspection and quiet soul-searching. For the most part, they are slow pieces, delicate ballads that sacrifice rhythmic drive in exchange for a ruminative self-questioning. But 'Once I Loved' is that rarity--a melancholy soliloquy that shouldn't be played too slowly. The composition works best at a medium tempo, almost as if the lingering nostalgia of the lyrics needs to tussle with the forward momentum of the bossa nova beat."

== Recorded versions ==
- Wanda de Sah - Softly! (1965)
- Cannonball Adderley – Cannonball's Bossa Nova (1962)
- Gene Ammons – Brasswind (1974)
- Chet Baker & Steve Houben – Chet Baker Steve Houben (1980)
- Charlie Byrd – Brazilian Byrd (1965)
- Luz Casal – Alma (2013)
- Rosemary Clooney – Brazil (2000)
- Perry Como – Lightly Latin (1966)
- Chick Corea & Gary Burton – Hot House (2012)
- Gal Costa – Gal Bossa Tropical (2002)
- Vic Damone – Stay with Me (1966)
- Eumir Deodato – Inútil Paisagem – As Maiores Composições de Antonio Carlos Jobim (1964)
- Eliane Elias – Eliane Elias Sings Jobim (1998)
- Herb Ellis – Roll Call (1991)
- Clare Fischer – Só Danço Samba (1964)
- Jacob Fischer – Black Orpheus (2014)
- Ella Fitzgerald & Joe Pass – Take Love Easy (1973)
- Hal Galper – Dreamsville (1987)
- Astrud Gilberto – The Astrud Gilberto Album (1965)
- João Gilberto – The Legendary João Gilberto (1961)
- Eddie Gómez, Alberto Medina & Pablo Prieto – Trilogy (2016)
- Stéphane Grappelli & Baden Powell – La Grande Reunion (1974)
- Vince Guaraldi – An Afternoon with the Vince Guaraldi Quartet (1967), The Eclectic Vince Guaraldi (1969)
- Joe Henderson – The Kicker (1967)
- Joe Henderson – with Oscar Castro-Neves, Double Rainbow: The Music of Antonio Carlos Jobim (1995)
- Jon Hendricks – ¡Salud! João Gilberto, Originator of the Bossa Nova (1961) – as "Love in Peace (O Amor em Paz)"
- Shirley Horn – Close Enough for Love (1989)
- Toninho Horta – Once I Loved (1992)
- Milt Jackson – Soul Fusion (1977)
- Antônio Carlos Jobim – The Composer of Desafinado Plays (1963)
- Elvin Jones – The Prime Element (rec. 1969 – released in 1976)
- Karin Krog/Jacob Young – Where Flamingo Fly (2002)
- Patrizia Laquidara – Cara! (2013)
- Ivan Lins – Olha Que Coisa Mais Linda: Uma Homenagem a Tom Jobim (2001)
- Yo-Yo Ma – Obrigado Brazil (2003)
- Herbie Mann – Do the Bossa Nova with Herbie Mann (1963)
- Pat Martino – El Hombre (1967)
- Ronnie Mathews, Ray Drummond, Kenny Washington – Song For Leslie (1980)
- Mina – L'allieva (2005)
- Wes Montgomery – Goin' Out of My Head (1966)
- Jaques Morelenbaum, Paula Morelenbaum, and Ryuichi Sakamoto – Casa (2001)
- Frank Morgan – Love, Lost & Found (1995)
- Gerry Mulligan, with Jane Duboc – Paraiso (1993)
- Nara Leão – Dez Anos Depois (1971)
- Os Cariocas – A Bossa Dos Cariocas (1963)
- Horace Parlan – Hi-Fly (1978)
- Duke Pearson – I Don't Care Who Knows It (rec. 1969 – released in 1996)
- Bill Perkins – Bossa Nova With Strings Attached: The Tenor of Bill Perkins (1963)
- Dianne Reeves – When You Know (2008)
- Frank Sinatra & Antônio Carlos Jobim – Francis Albert Sinatra & Antonio Carlos Jobim (1967)
- Sylvia Telles – Bossa, Balanço, Balada (1963)
- Jim Tomlinson – Brazilian Sketches (2003)
- McCoy Tyner – Trident (1975)
- Cedar Walton – The Trio 3 (1985)
- The Tony Williams Lifetime – Turn It Over (1970)
- Kai Winding – Penny Lane & Time (1967)
- Chrissie Hynde – Valve Bone Woe (2019)
- Shigeharu Mukai – Hip Cruiser (1979)
