= 36 Greatest Hits! =

36 Greatest Hits

Compilation album by Frank Sinatra
- Released: January 25, 2010
- Recorded: 1960–1979
- Genres: Vocal jazz; traditional pop
- Label: Reprise

Frank Sinatra chronology
Sinatra: New York (2009)	36 Greatest Hits (2010)	Sinatra/Jobim: The Complete Reprise Recordings (2010)

36 Greatest Hits! is a 2010 box set by American singer Frank Sinatra. This box set contains 36 songs he recorded for his own label, Reprise.

== Track listing ==
=== Disc one ===
1. "I've Got You Under My Skin" (Cole Porter) - 3:26
2. "All or Nothing at All" (Jack Lawrence, Arthur Altman) - 3:57
3. "For Once in My Life" (Ron Miller, Orlando Murden) - 2:50
4. "I Never Knew" (Ted Fio Rito, Gus Kahn)
5. "Moon River" (Henry Mancini, Johnny Mercer) - 3:20
6. "The Lady Is a Tramp" (Richard Rodgers, Lorenz Hart) - 2:58
7. "Night and Day" (Porter) - 3:37
8. "I Get a Kick Out of You" (Porter) - 3:14
9. "Born Free" (Don Black, John Barry) - 2:05
10. "Hello, Dolly!" (Jerry Herman) - 2:45
11. "Something" (George Harrison) - 4:42
12. "My Way" (Paul Anka, Claude Francois, Jacques Revaux, Gilles Thibaut) - 4:36

=== Disc two ===
1. "Ring-A-Ding-Ding" (Jimmy Van Heusen, Sammy Cahn)
2. "Summer Wind" (Mercer, Hanz Bradtke, Heinz Meyer)
3. "Swinging on a Star" (Van Heusen, Johnny Burke)
4. "I Wished on the Moon" (Dorothy Parker, Ralph Rainger)
5. "Then Suddenly Love" (Ray Alfred, Paul Vance)
6. "Love Me Tender" (Vera Matson, Elvis Presley)
7. "The Continental" (Herb Magidson, Con Conrad)
8. "I'll Never Smile Again" (Ruth Lowe)
9. "It's a Wonderful World" (Adamson, Jan Savitt, Johnny Watson)
10. "Send in the Clowns" (Stephen Sondheim)
11. "Pocketful of Miracles" (Cahn, Van Heusen)
12. "Softly, as I Leave You" (Hal Shaper, Antonio DeVito, Giorgio Calabrese)

=== Disc three ===
1. "Strangers in the Night" (Bert Kaempfert, Charles Singleton, Eddie Snyder)
2. "Witchcraft" (Cy Coleman, Carolyn Leigh)
3. "Nancy (With the Laughing Face)" (Phil Silvers, Van Heusen)
4. "Star!" (Cahn, Van Heusen)
5. "Gentle On My Mind" (John Hartford)
6. "That's Life" (Kelly Gordon, Dean Thompson)
7. "Are You Lonesome Tonight?" (Roy Turk, Lou Handman)
8. "The Look of Love" (Cahn, Van Heusen)
9. "The Very Thought of You" (Ray Noble)
10. "Without a Song" (Vincent Youmans, Billy Rose, Edward Eliscu)
11. "Young at Heart" (Leigh, Johnny Richards)
12. "Put Your Dreams Away (For Another Day)" (Paul Mann, Stephen Weiss, Lowe)
