= La question (album) =

Studio album by Françoise Hardy
- Released: October 16, 1971
- Studios: Studio CBE; Studio Davout; Paris, France
- Genres: French pop; bossa nova
- Length: 32:25
- Language: French
- Label: Sonopresse

Françoise Hardy chronology
Soleil (1970)	La question (1971)	4th English Album (1971)

Singles from La question
- 1. "Le martien" / "Chanson d'O" Released: Summer 1971; 2. "Même sous la pluie" / "La question" Released: October 1971; 3. "Rêve" / "Poisson" Released: March 1972

La question (pronounced [la kɛstjɔ̃]; French for "The question") is the eleventh studio album by French singer-songwriter Françoise Hardy, released in October 1971 on Sonopresse. Like many of her previous records, it was originally released without a title and came to be referred to, later on, by the name of its most popular song. It is her second album produced under Hypopotam, a production company she established in 1970. The music on the album was almost entirely composed by the Brazilian musician Tuca, who supervised the project and participated as a guitarist.

One of her most sparsely produced albums, La question combines Hardy's sensual vocals with bossa nova-tinged guitar playing, touches of bass and subtle string arrangements. Lyrically, it encompasses themes of love, anxiety, eroticism and fear, attributed to instabilities in her relationship with Jacques Dutronc at that time. While the album was not well received by French audiences and radio stations upon release, it earned the acclaim of critics and came to be viewed as a turning point in Hardy's career, in which she moved toward a less commercial and more mature style. The album has since attained cult status, and is celebrated as one of the most important works in Hardy's discography.

== Background ==
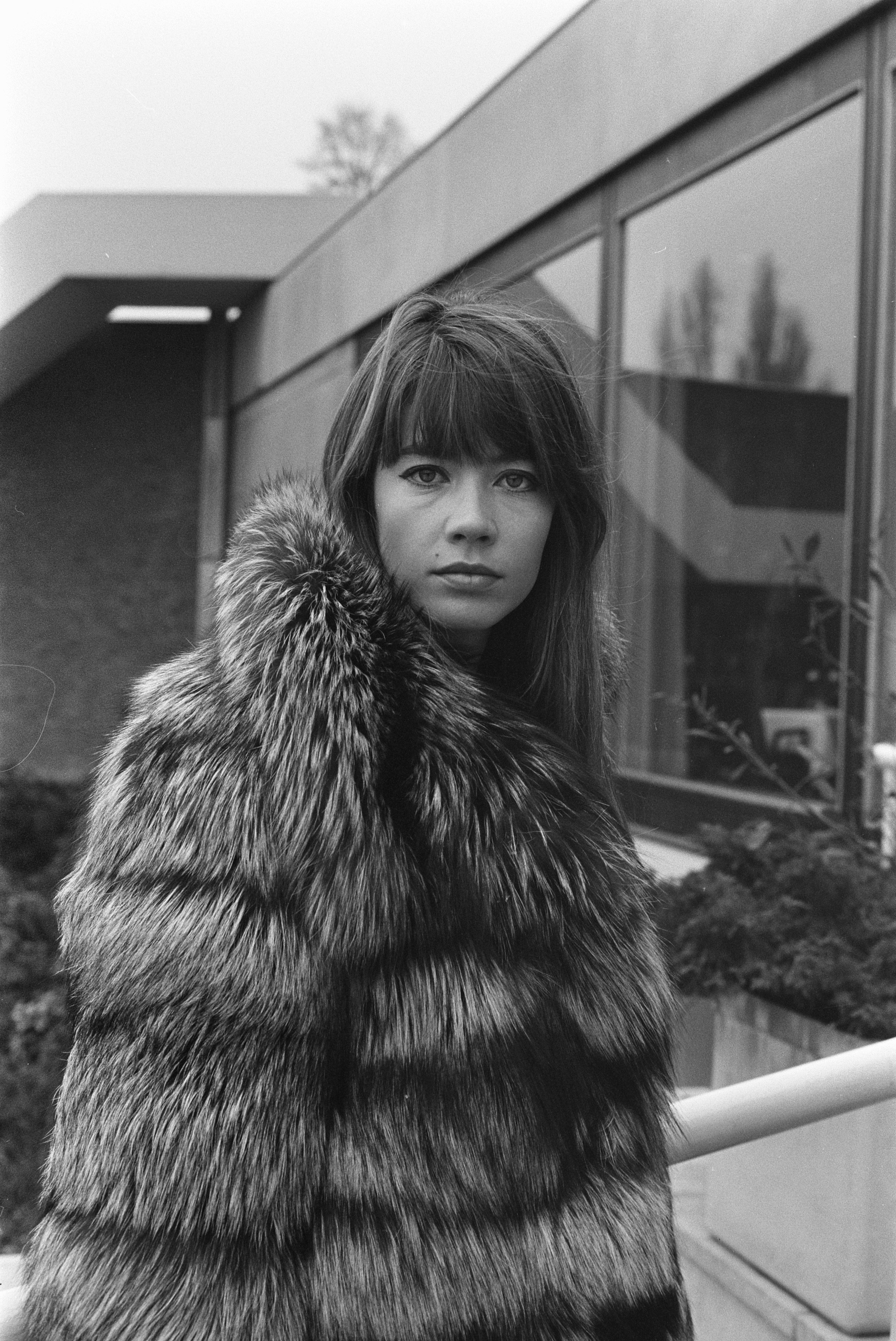
Hardy in December 1969

Hardy made her musical debut in the early 1960s on Disques Vogue and was an immediate success as one of the most prominent figures of the yé-yé phenomenon. During the decade, she "found herself at the very forefront of the French music scene", and became "France's most exportable female singing star", recording in various languages, appearing in several movies, touring throughout Europe, and gaining admiration from musicians such as Bob Dylan and Mick Jagger. In 1962, the singer met photographer Jean-Marie Périer, with whom she engaged in a romantic relationship until 1967. Périer - who has been described as "a veritable Pygmalion for the young singer" - helped her to develop a more modern personal style and persuaded her to begin modelling; Hardy soon became a popular fashion icon as well. In 1969, she became embroiled in a lengthy legal battle with her record label, Disques Vogue, and saw the closure of her own production company, Productions Aspargus. The company had faced the resistance of the label's executives, and Hardy's decision to no longer perform live as well as sign with Sonopresse further aggravated the situation. As the yé-yé era drew to a close in the late 1960s, Hardy sought to reinvent herself, beginning by casting off the fashionable girl next door image that Périer had created for her. In an effort to reflect her inner self to a greater extent, the singer also abandoned the "cute" and catchy compositions that had characterized her repertoire up to that point. In the albums that immediately preceded La question, Hardy had begun to work with more accomplished songwriters such as Leonard Cohen, Serge Gainsbourg, and Patrick Modiano. In 1970, she founded the production company Hypopotam, and its first album, Soleil, was released the same year.

== Development ==
"Usually, when we record an album, we do not have time to rework the songs before with the composer. We ended up learning them alone in a corner and running the risk of acquiring bad habits which it would later be difficult to get rid of. Then we sang for the first time in the recording studio without being necessarily well prepared, and the recording of a song took only an hour or two at most. With Tuca, everything was different."

— Françoise Hardy, 2008.

Towards the early 1970s, Hardy met Valeniza Zagni da Silva - known by the pseudonym Tuca - a Brazilian singer and guitarist based in Paris, who performed every night at a Brazilian restaurant called La Feijoada. They met through Lena, another Brazilian woman based in Paris and an intimate friend of the singer. Lena comforted Hardy as she went through a "[tormenting]" period caused by instabilities in her relationship with fellow musician Jacques Dutronc. Among the personnel listed on the album's liner notes, the name "Pinocchio" is credited as "catalyzer". This period also marked the beginning of Hardy's renowned involvement with astrology, partly also thanks to the support of the Brazilian. Tuca and Hardy connected very well; the singer later described their meeting as "love at first sight, personally and artistically speaking." After attending the Festival Internacional da Canção in Rio de Janeiro – and having come into contact with the music of Brazil – Hardy decided to work with Tuca. The singer was particularly infatuated with "Même sous la pluie", a song Tuca had made for another artist but eventually gave to Hardy.

Tuca wound up composing the music for all but one song in the album, "Doigts", and rehearsed them with Hardy every day for a month before entering the studio. This was an atypical process for Hardy, as "all [her] previous albums were developed in the studio, leaving no time for [the singer] to work with the composer and explore different interpretive paths." She recorded the album with Tuca on guitar, Guy Pedersen on bass, and Bernard Estardy behind the console, finishing each track after three takes. At the time of the recording, Tuca was also suffering from an unrequited love that would shape the album's content, as she wanted to be with the Italian actress Lea Massari, who was not a lesbian. After the recording sessions, the duo took a break in Corsica, returning later to compose the string arrangements. For this, Tuca played different themes on a piano for Hardy; once they were chosen, Raymond Donnez was asked to write them. Thus, the making of La question also marked the first time Hardy "participated in such a crucial choice." Catherine Lara – a violinist the singer met through Claude Nougaro – contacted the Orchestra of Paris, where she performed, to play the string arrangements. Lara was a close friend of Hardy, and continued to collaborate with her throughout that decade.

== Composition ==
"Chanson d'O"
A representative of the album's sound, "Chanson d'O" features erotic, wordles vocals, a "weightless melody", and guitar playing reminiscent of bossa nova.

"Rêve"
"Heard by itself, it might understandably be too MOR for many listeners. Heard in the context of La question, where it closes an album where spare, acoustic-flavored arrangements anchor some of Hardy's most frankly sexual deliveries, it makes an appropriately grand finale, as if bringing a love story to a happy final-credits ending."
– Richie Unterberger, 2015

La question is one of Hardy's "most sparsely produced efforts," the result of Tuca's "characteristically delicate and uncluttered arrangements" that accompany the singer with an acoustic guitar, touches of bass, and subtle orchestration. It showcases a distancing from the usual pop framework of Hardy's earlier releases, adopting "richer melodies and unexpected variations in rhythm." Through Tuca's guitar playing, the album incorporates elements of Brazilian music, most notably bossa nova. Nevertheless, Hardy was reluctant to produce an album of pure Brazilian music, stating that she disliked traditional music. Jean-Emmanuel Deluxe, writing for the Red Bull Music Academy, described the album as "a marvellous dialogue between French pop and Brazilian saudade". Writing for PopMatters, Matt James felt that with La question - and albums Soleil (1970) and If You Listen (1972) - Hardy "smartly [reinvented] herself as an elusive folk rock jazz chanteuse." Raymond Donnez's string arrangements have been described as "lush", "dark" and "intense". The singer's vocals have been called "sultry" and "breathy", at times "[substituting] melodic humming in the place of singing, wordlessly articulating the emotional essence of the song." According to The Guardian, "La question defines the sound that polite people call 'after hours'." The record's lyrics - the work of Hardy, Pascal Bilat, Franck Gérald and G.G. - address themes of love, anxiety, eroticism, and fear. The instabilities in the relationship between the singer and her future husband, Jacques Dutronc, have been identified as being responsible for the adoption of this tone.

=== Songs ===
The album opens in a "dramatic" tone with "Viens" ("Come"), which was "designed to grab the listener's attention." Its lyrics are "a first-person plea for passionate love", with Hardy singing: "Come/My heart has always given its all/I've been burned many times/But I'm not afraid of suffering [again]." The song has been noted for its "ambitious use of the strings," used to reflect the tension expressed in its lyrics. Regarding the track, 50thirdand3rd considered that: "The intensity of the string arrangement reflects both the inner tension and desire, the bass echoes the throbbing beat of a heart in heat, but what really makes this song is Françoise Hardy's wordless vocalizations." "Viens" is followed by the title track, which "[establishes] the album's elegant dreamlike mood." Hardy's lyrics deal with uncertainty, reflecting on the "distance that develops between two people despite one's best efforts." Expressing a sense of misfortune, and the inability to remedy it, she sings: "I don't know why I stay in a sea that makes me drown/I don't know why I stay in air that will get me choked/You're the blood of my wound, you're the fire of my burns/You're my question without an answer, my mute cry and my silence." These last lines stress the narrator's "existential isolation". Her phrasing is much more flexible than in her previous pop songs, as she "[elongates] and [spaces] syllables behind and ahead of the beat", while Tuca's offbeat guitar is "syncopated to the natural flow of emotion instead of paying strict attention to the bars or the time signature." Hardy chose to abandon the lyrics for "Chanson d'O" ("Song of O"), opting for what have been described as "ecstatic vocalizations", including "sighs, growls and groans of pleasure." The song is considered a reference to Histoire d'O, an erotic novel published in 1954 that dealt with female submission. "Le martien" ("The Martian") has a "dreamy" and surreal atmosphere, with an "otherworldly" background created through breaths and traditional instruments. The lyrics for the song are about a Martian who descends from the sky to ask for the hand of the narrator.

Written by Hardy, the lyrics of "Mer" ("Sea") concern suicide in a gentle manner, as she intones: "I would love to fall asleep in the sea—magical, original, in its essential rhythm. I would love the sea to take me back to be reborn—elsewhere than inside my head, somewhere other than the earth, where without my love I can do nothing." The song's string arrangements imitate the tide of the sea, "both menacing and welcoming", like the possibility of killing oneself. Similarly to "Viens", the lyrics on "Oui, je dis adieu" ("Yes, I Say Goodbye") describe the rupture of a couple, as Hardy sings: "Your show and your emptiness/Your weaknesses and your tiredness/Don't mean anything to me anymore/With you I am not anything", and "Without a future or present/I don't feel like it anymore/That waste of my time". "Doigts" ("Fingers") has been considered the most sensual song in the album, as its lyrics "describe the art of communication through touch." It is followed by "La maison" ("The House"), an "[intensely melancholic]" track in which Hardy combines singing with spoken word. The main melody of "Si mi caballero" ("Yes My Gentleman") is both sung and whistled. "Bâti mon nid" ("Built My Nest") has been described as "a lively Brazilian jazz piece featuring a female-male vocal duet, an energetic double bass line and wonderful syncopation." With its "la-la-la" chorus, the song presents a "particularly catchy" moment of the album. Closing track "Rêve" ("Dream") is a cover of "A transa", a song by Taiguara. Author Richie Unterberger felt that "Hardy curbs the fussiest excesses of the original, and adds some pretty enchanting cloud-drifting scat vocals through most of the arrangement." It also features a "la-la-la" refrain, followed by Hardy's lyrics: "You marvel me like a dream/That finally came true/And you hurt me like a dream/I shall awake from". The "progrescent passage" of the almost instrumental track has been noted for its resemblance to "The Court of the Crimson King", a 1969 song by King Crimson.

== Release ==
La question was released as a LP record on October 16, 1971, on Sonopresse. That year, the album was also released in Spain on Hispavox, in Mexico on Gamma, in Australia on Interfusion, in the Netherlands on CBS, and in Canada on Reprise Records. Due to its sensuality – and consequent associations with the erotic novel Histoire d'O – the track "Chanson d'O" was threatened with prohibition in Spain, prompting an irritated Hardy to state: "How could I do porn? It is absurd." In South Africa, the album was released under the title Rêve on MVN. The album received the title Un recueil de mes poésies ("A collection of my poems") in Japan, where it was released in 1974 on Epic. Sonopresse released three 7" record singles from La question: "Le martien" and "Même sous la pluie" in 1971, and "Rêve" in 1972. The latter contained "Poisson" as its B-side, a previously unreleased track written by Jacques Blanchard. The album was first reissued as a compact disc (CD) in 1988 on record label Flarenasch, under the title Viens.

== Reception ==
Professional ratings
Review scores
Source	Rating
AllMusic	4.5/5 stars
Encyclopedia of Popular Music	4/5 stars
MusicHound Rock	4/5 stars
Music Story	3/5 stars
Nightfall.fr	5/5 stars
Pitchfork	9.0/10

La question was highly acclaimed by the French press upon its initial release. However, it sold poorly in comparison to other works by the singer, as it received little promotion in television, and failed to gain traction in radio stations and among audiences at the time. According to Radio France Internationale, the singer "appeared to be completely unperturbed by poor album sales, preferring to find an audience who respected her true self rather than millions of adoring fans who were seduced by a superficial image." In her autobiography, Hardy wrote:

"This record seemed to me to be more homogeneous, with more class and sophistication than the others, and if it did not find, unlike the others, the success of the general public, I pretend to believe it reached another. An example: in the 1980s, I quickly met Suzanne Vega and she recognized me thanks to that album that her brother often listened to. On another occasion, I was going to Japan and journalists confessed their predilection for this album. An ambitious album is more or less unnoticed on its release, but it continues to exist for a long time."

In retrospect, La question has continued to receive generally positive reviews. Writing for AllMusic, Richie Unterberger lauded the album, choosing "La question", "Le martien" and "Bâti mon nid" as the album's most representative tracks, and writing: "As fireside romantic music goes, it beats the hell out of José Feliciano." In 2015, he also stated that La question is "easily her strongest post-mid-1960s album, not to mention one of the all-time makeout records." The Quietus, Télérama, PopMatters, Pitchfork and Indie Hoy agreed to call it Hardy's masterpiece. Writing for the Brazilian online magazine Obvious, Vitor Dirami considered it "one of the most sophisticated and conceptual records of her career." French website Nightfall.fr gave La question a five-out-of-five stars rating, describing it as "an album whose beauty is more than resplendent." Qobuz Magazine considered that the album remains Hardy's best effort, as did Ferran Llauradó of Rockdelux.

== Legacy ==
"La question transformed French perceptions of Françoise Hardy; the sweet girl next door had become a woman—vibrant, alive and wise beyond her years. With [the album, she] took a risk she did not have to take: she could have easily continued recording nice pop tunes until she reached her sworn retirement age of fifty. Fortunately for us, the connection she made with Tuca triggered the dormant potential inside, and together they created a timeless work of art—erotic, sensual and intensely beautiful."

— 50thirdand3rd reviewing the album in 2015.

Despite its poor commercial performance upon release, La question has generated a dedicated cult following over the years, remaining a classic among her fans for its "lyrical sensuality and sophisticated arrangements." It is considered Hardy's artistic peak and "an unquestionable member of the French pop canon". Matt James of PopMatters felt that something in the album "remains magical, untouchable, consistently influential and thus perhaps even quietly revolutionary." Indie Hoy described it in 2021 as a "cult record still unfairly underrated by Anglo-centric music critics and undoubtedly a culminating work of French pop of all time." Reissuing the album in 2016, EMI stated: "La question has become a virtual calling-card for Hardy and has proven to be extremely influential on the modern French pop scene." The review also read: "Although she's had albums that were more successful, sales-wise, [the album] continues to be embraced by new generations of music fans." Writer Syd Fablo felt that the album "[puts] forward [a musical persona] that [was] unique to the heyday second-wave feminism—not in terms of overt feminist militancy but instead (and somewhat paradoxically) by being unassuming thinking-woman's music of a kind that simply wasn't given much of an airing in prior times."

Writers agree that the album represents an important turning point in Hardy's career, moving towards a more mature style and abandoning her more commercial efforts of her yé-yé period. Pitchfork's Jazz Monroe wrote that the "spare, haunting [album] might be the first truly personal Françoise Hardy record." The singer has acknowledged this, stating: "I was never as proud of a work as with this record, it was my best album, classic and sophisticated." She also reflected in a 2012 interview:

"[During the 1960s] radios were practicing a real hype, much more than today. We, the singers were far, far fewer than today - and there were fewer radios. It was also the heyday of Salut les copains, and the press played an extremely important role, it could promote beginners. [...] At the same time, fashion had become increasingly important, it had never been. [...]

However, I felt that we were not very popular with the previous generation, or with some journalists. I never felt a great sympathy, a great receptivity in someone like Denise Glaser especially. Or Pierre Dumayet (among others), who wanted to pinch us over our ignorance—we often came from relatively poor working classes, while the next wave of Alain Souchon, Véronique Sanson, Michel Berger, Julien Clerc came from... the bourgeoisie. I felt oddly legitimized in the early 1970s, when I made [La question]. This album did not work at all but I felt that I was moved to another stage, and I was interesting people I had never interested before."

The album was influential to Greg Gonzalez, leader of the American dream pop group Cigarettes After Sex, who cited Hardy as his favorite singer and stated: "La question is just so perfect, I wanted that kind of beauty." Musicians Suzanne Vega and Keren Ann have also expressed their admiration for the album, and Alison Goldfrapp of the English electronic music duo Goldfrapp stated that it directly influenced the writing of their 2013 album Tales Of Us. American singer-songwriter Alyssa Graham called Hardy a "constant source of inspiration," and wrote: "La question is brilliantly produced and offers everything you could ever want from this dreamy and stunning artist." British publication The Guardian included the album in its list of the "1000 Albums to Hear Before You Die," describing it as "the most sensual record in the whole canon." Belgian music journalist Gilles Verlant listed La question as one of the 300 Best Albums in the History of Rock.

== Track listing ==
Side A
No.	Title	Lyrics	Music	Length
1.	"Viens"	Pascal Bilat	Tuca	2:11
2.	"La question"	Françoise Hardy	Tuca	3:00
3.	"Même sous la pluie"	Franck Gérald	Tuca	2:01
4.	"Chanson d'O"	Bob du Pac	Tuca	3:14
5.	"Le martien"	Franck Gérald	Tuca	2:44
6.	"Mer"	Françoise Hardy	Tuca	2:04
Total length:				15:14

Side B
No.	Title	Lyrics	Music	Length
1.	"Oui, je dis adieu"	Françoise Hardy	Tuca	4:02
2.	"Doigts"	Françoise Hardy	Françoise Hardy	1:25
3.	"La maison"	G. G.	Tuca	2:51
4.	"Si mi caballero"	Franck Gérald	Tuca	3:00
5.	"Bâti mon nid"	Franck Gérald	Tuca	2:53
6.	"Rêve"	Françoise Hardy	Taiguara	3:00
Total length:				17:11

== Personnel ==
Credits adapted from La question's liner notes and AllMusic, except where otherwise noted.

- Françoise Hardy – primary artist, composer, vocals
- Tuca – composer, guitar, artistic direction
- Raymond Donnez – arranger
- Francis Moze – bass
- Guy Pedersen – bass
- Bernard Estardy – engineer
- René Ameline – engineer
- Orchestre de Paris - string instruments
- Jean-Marie Périer – front photography
- Catherine Rotulo – back photography
- Gilbert Moreau – back photography
- Pinocchio – catalyzer [sic]

== See also ==
- 1971 in music
- Dez anos depois – studio album by Nara Leão, also released in 1971 and recorded with Tuca in Paris
- Chamber folk
- Songs about heartache
