= Tuca (musician) =

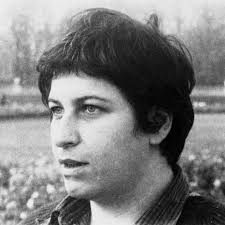

Background information
- Born: Valeniza Zagni da Silva; October 17, 1944; São Paulo, Brazil
- Died: May 8, 1978 (aged 33) São Paulo, Brazil
- Genres: Bossa nova; MPB
- Instruments: Vocals; guitar
- Years active: 1966-1974

Tuca (born Valeniza Zagni da Silva, 17 October 1944 - 8 May 1978) was a Brazilian guitarist, songwriter, and singer. She is best known for her collaborations with Françoise Hardy on Hardy's album La Question, and with Nara Leao on Leao's album Dez Anos Depois, both released in 1971.

== Career ==
Tuca studied classical music at the Musical and Dramatic Conservatory of São Paulo. As a young woman, she released two albums in Brazil: Meu, Eu in 1966, and Eu, Tuca on the Philips label in 1968. Neither sold well, and in 1969 she moved to France to escape Brazil's repressive military regime. She was playing and singing in a Brazilian restaurant in Paris called La Feijoada when Françoise Hardy first encountered her music. As critic Diego Olivas wrote, “A brief trip to Brazil had shown Françoise that through Brazilian music she could escape her cutesy, pop image. With Tuca she could really explore new boundaries.”

Tuca played guitar, co-arranged, and co-wrote most of the songs on Hardy's 1971 album La Question. After a month of rehearsal, Hardy and Tuca recorded the album in Paris in a few days. Although it sold poorly at the time, La Question has gone on to become perhaps Hardy's best-known record. Richie Unterberger quoted Hardy as saying, “It’s the only album that I re-listen to regularly, and I find that it still holds a punch.”

That same year, Tuca played guitar and did arrangements on Dez Anos Depois by Nara Leão, another Brazilian musician who had exiled to Paris for political reasons. The Slipcue Guide to Brazilian Music asserted that “the spare arrangements and distinctive acoustic accompaniment by guitarist Tuca make this one of the best latter-day bossa nova records out there.”

According to Hardy, Tuca became “besotted with a young Brazilian who would prove fatal to her,” and returned to Brazil. She signed with the Brazilian Som Livre label, but recorded her last album, Dracula, I Love You, at the Château D’Hérouville Studios outside of Paris. As Diego Olivas wrote, “Given free reign[sic] to sing and play how she wanted to … Tuca crafted and vocalized songs that spoke of a far more intense pain than anything she had let on in the work of Françoise and Nara, with orchestration that roared around her.”

== Personal life ==
Tuca was lesbian. Françoise Hardy noted that she was infatuated with Italian actress Lea Massari, who was heterosexual and in a relationship.

== Death ==
Tuca was obese for most of her life. As Françoise Hardy recounted in her autobiography, “Tuca came up with the following equation: ‘You don’t eat: you die. You eat: you die. I eat.’ Unfortunately, when she returned to Brazil ... she gained 90 extra pounds and decided to lose them. An unscrupulous doctor helped her lose weight too fast, her potassium rate fell, and she died before she knew what was happening.” She died in 1978 at 33 years old.

== Discography ==
- 1966: Meu, Eu (guitar, vocals, songwriting, arrangements)
- 1968: Eu, Tuca (guitar, vocals, songwriting, arrangements)
- 1971: Dez Anos Depois by Nara Leão (guitar, songwriting, arrangements)
- 1971: La Question by Françoise Hardy (guitar, songwriting, arrangements)
- 1974: Dracula, I Love You (guitar, vocals, songwriting, arrangements)
