= Francis Albert Sinatra & Antonio Carlos Jobim =

Studio album by Frank Sinatra and Antônio Carlos Jobim
- Released: Late March 1967
- Recorded: January 30 and February 1, 1967, at United Western Recorders, Hollywood, Los Angeles
- Genre: Bossa nova
- Length: 28:05
- Languages: English and Portuguese
- Labels: Reprise; FS 1021
- Producer: Sonny Burke

Frank Sinatra chronology
That's Life (1966)	Francis Albert Sinatra & Antonio Carlos Jobim (1967)	The World We Knew (1967)

Antônio Carlos Jobim chronology
Love, Strings and Jobim (1966)	Francis Albert Sinatra & Antonio Carlos Jobim (1967)	A Certain Mr. Jobim (1967)

Professional ratings
Review scores
Source	Rating
AllMusic	4.5/5 stars
Billboard	"Spotlight" pick

Francis Albert Sinatra & Antonio Carlos Jobim is a 1967 album by Frank Sinatra and Antônio Carlos Jobim. The tracks were arranged and conducted by Claus Ogerman, accompanied by a studio orchestra. Along with Jobim's original compositions, the album features three standards from the Great American Songbook, ("Change Partners", "I Concentrate on You", and "Baubles, Bangles and Beads") arranged in the bossa nova style.

Sinatra and Jobim followed up this album with sessions for a second collaboration, titled Sinatra-Jobim. That album was briefly released on 8-track tape (Reprise 8FH 1028) in 1969 before being taken out of print at Sinatra's behest, due to concerns over its sales potential. Several of the Sinatra-Jobim tracks were subsequently incorporated in the Sinatra & Company album (1971) and the Sinatra–Jobim Sessions compilation (1979). In 2010 the Concord Records label issued a new, comprehensive compilation titled Sinatra/Jobim: The Complete Reprise Recordings.

At the 10th Annual Grammy Awards in 1968, Francis Albert Sinatra & Antonio Carlos Jobim was nominated for the Grammy Award for Album of the Year, but lost to the Beatles' Sgt. Pepper's Lonely Hearts Club Band. Sinatra had won the previous two Grammy awards for album of the year, in 1967 and 1966, and Jobim 1965. It was also nominated in the category of Best Vocal Performance, Male, eventually losing to Glen Campbell's recording of "By the Time I Get to Phoenix."

Jobim had to wait for Sinatra to return from a holiday in Barbados where he was taking a mutually agreed break from his marriage to Mia Farrow.

Guitarist Al Viola played on "Change Partners" due to Jobim's difficulty with the track, but is not credited on the album. Lyricists Aloysio de Oliveria and Ray Gilbert were also present at the sessions.

The album was recorded on January 30 and February 1, 1967, at United Western Recorders in Hollywood, Los Angeles. Later in the evening of February 1, Sinatra and his daughter, Nancy, recorded their single "Somethin' Stupid".

== Track listing ==
No.	Title	Writer(s)	Length
1.	"The Girl from Ipanema"	Antônio Carlos Jobim, Norman Gimbel, Vinícius de Moraes	3:00
2.	"Dindi"	Ray Gilbert, Jobim, Aloísio de Oliveira	3:25
3.	"Change Partners"	Irving Berlin	2:40
4.	"Quiet Nights of Quiet Stars (Corcovado)"	Jobim, Gene Lees	2:45
5.	"Meditation (Meditação)"	Jobim, Gimbel, Newton Mendonça	2:51
6.	"If You Never Come to Me (Inútil Paisagem)"	Jobim, Gilbert, de Oliveira	2:10
7.	"How Insensitive (Insensatez)"	Jobim, Gimbel, de Moraes	3:15
8.	"I Concentrate on You"	Cole Porter	2:32
9.	"Baubles, Bangles and Beads"	Robert C. Wright, George Forrest	2:32
10.	"Once I Loved (O Amor em Paz)"	Jobim, Gilbert, de Moraes	2:37

== Personnel ==
- Frank Sinatra – vocal
- Antônio Carlos Jobim – piano, acoustic guitar, backing vocals
- Claus Ogerman – arranger, conductor

== Charts ==
Chart (1967)	Peak position
US Billboard 200	19
US Top Jazz Albums (Billboard)	4
