= Portrait of Sinatra – Forty Songs from the Life of a Man =

Portrait of Sinatra - Forty Songs from the Life of a Man
- Cover artwork from the 1977 UK album release

Compilation album by Frank Sinatra
- Released: 1977
- Recorded: 1961–1977
- Genre: Jazz
- Label: Reprise; K 64039

Frank Sinatra chronology
The Main Event – Live (1974)	Portrait of Sinatra - Forty Songs from the Life of a Man (1977)	Sinatra–Jobim Sessions (1979)

Portrait of Sinatra – Forty Songs from the Life of a Man is a 1977 compilation (Gatefold) album by American singer Frank Sinatra that consists of 40 songs that were recorded for Reprise Records. It spent a total of eighteen non-consecutive weeks in the UK Albums Chart, reaching number-one for two weeks on 2 April 1977. It became Sinatra's fourth album to top the British charts, his first since 1957's A Swingin' Affair! to claim pole position, and also his most recent chart-topping album in the UK.

The sleeve design was illustrated by English portrait painter Michael Noakes, who won a platinum disc for his work. The artwork on the back cover of the gatefold album shows an outline charcoal drawing of Sinatra's face; one of the inside sleeves shows a partially painted version of that same outline charcoal drawing; the other inside sleeve lists the album's tracks and several tributes to Sinatra from artists such as Frankie Valli, Hoagy Carmichael; Bing Crosby, Nelson Riddle, Count Basie and Antonio Carlos Jobim; and the front cover itself shows the fully completed portrait of Sinatra's face. The album was not issued in the U.S & has never had an official release on CD in the UK.

== Track listing ==
=== Side One ===
1. "Let's Face the Music and Dance"
2. "Nancy (With the Laughing Face)" - 2:31
3. "I've Got You Under My Skin" - 3:26
4. "Let Me Try Again (Laisse Moi Le Temps)" - 3:31
5. "Fly Me to the Moon" - 2:29
6. "All or Nothing at All" - 3:57
7. "For Once in My Life" - 2:50
8. "Bonita" - 3:39
9. "My Kind of Town" - 3:10
10. "Call Me Irresponsible" - 2:56

=== Side Ttwo ===
1. "All the Way" - 3:26
2. "Strangers in the Night" - 2:36
3. "Didn't We?"
4. "Come Fly with Me" - 3:11
5. "The Second Time Around" - 3:03
6. "In the Wee Small Hours of the Morning" - 2:53
7. "Bad, Bad Leroy Brown"
8. "Softly, as I Leave You"
9. "Cycles"
10. "Send in the Clowns" - 3:39

=== Side Three ===
1. "That's Life" - 3:07
2. "Little Green Apples" - 5:00
3. "The Song of the Sabiá"
4. "Goody Goody" - 1:47
5. "Empty Tables"
6. "I Believe I'm Gonna Love You"
7. "Stargazer"
8. "I Sing the Songs (I Write the Songs)"
9. "You Are the Sunshine of My Life" - 2:37
10. "It Was a Very Good Year" - 4:25

=== Side Four ===
1. "Somethin' Stupid" (with Nancy Sinatra) - 2:45
2. "Young at Heart" - 2:52
3. "You Make Me Feel So Young" - 3:21
4. "Yesterday" - 3:56
5. "Pennies from Heaven"
6. "If"
7. "Something" - 3:34
8. "Star!"
9. "Love's Been Good to Me"
10. "My Way" - 4:35

== Charts ==
=== Weekly charts ===
Chart (1977–78)	Peak position
Australian Albums (Kent Music Report)	83
UK Albums (OCC)	1

=== Year-end charts ===
Chart (1977)	Position
UK Albums (OCC)	13

== Certifications and sales ==
Region	Certification	Certified units/sales
United Kingdom (BPI)	Platinum	300,000^{^}
^{^} Shipments figures based on certification alone.
