= Madeleine Barnothy Forro =

Hungarian physicist (1904–1995)

- Barnóthy Forró Magdolna
- Born: August 21, 1904; Zsambok, Kingdom of Hungary, Austria-Hungary
- Died: February 1995 (aged 90); Evanston, Illinois, U.S.
- Education: Royal Hungarian University (PhD)
- Spouse: Jeno M. Barnothy (m. 1938)
- Scientific career
- Fields: Astrophysics; Biophysics
- Workplaces: Royal Hungarian University; Barat College; Northwestern University; University of Illinois Chicago

Madeleine Barnothy Forro (Hungarian: Barnóthy Forró Magdolna; August 21, 1904 – February 1995) was a Hungarian-American physicist and astrophysicist. Her work included research on cosmic ray physics, gravitational lensing, and the biophysics of magnetic fields.

== Life and career ==
Madeleine Forro was born in the village of Zsámbok, Hungary, on August 21, 1904, to Margit (née Somlo) and Robert Forro. She was awarded a doctorate in physics in 1927 from the Royal Hungarian University in Budapest for work measuring dielectric constants. Forro was the first woman to earn a doctorate in physics at the university. She then lectured at the university and undertook research on cosmic rays. She was appointed an associate professor in 1936. In 1938 she married her colleague, Jeno M. Barnothy. Madeleine Forro and Jeno M. Barnothy were early pioneers in cosmic ray research, designing large Geiger-Müller counters and building one of the first cosmic ray telescopes to study cosmic ray isotropy, time patterns, and high-energy spectra. Her research in the late 1930s observing cosmic rays, helped to reveal the nature of electrons, pions and muons.

The Barnothys struggled to reestablish cosmic ray research after the Second World War and in 1948 they emigrated to the United States, with Forro taking a professorship at Barat College, Illinois. In 1953 she began working as a research associate at Northwestern University. She became a naturalized U.S. citizen in 1954. In 1955 she began working for the University of Illinois Chicago, becoming a professor of physics in 1964.

In the 1960s Forro researched the biological effects of strong magnetic fields. In the 1960s and 1970s she co-authored about 40 papers with Barnothy on the effects of gravitational lensing on quasars. They proposed that quasars are amplified images of Seyfert galaxies due to gravitational lensing, which has since been shown to be the case for a small fraction of quasars.

Madeleine Forro was active in many professional organizations ranging from the American Astronomical Society and the American Physical Society to the German Astronomical Society and International Astronomical Union.

Forro died in February 1995 in Evanston, Illinois at the age of 90.

== Publications ==
- Barnothy, Madeleine F. (1964). Biological Effects of Magnetic Fields. Vol. 1. New York: Plenum Press.
- —————————— (1969). Biological Effects of Magnetic Fields. Vol. 2. New York: Plenum Press.
