= Someone to Light Up My Life =

Song by Antônio Carlos Jobim for the play Orfeu da Conceição

Song
- Composer: Antônio Carlos Jobim
- Lyricists: Vinicius de Moraes (Original); Gene Lees (English)

"Someone to Light Up My Life" (Portuguese: "Se Todos Fossem Iguais A Você", "If Everyone Was Like You") is a song composed by Antônio Carlos Jobim, with lyrics by Vinicius de Moraes. It was written for the play Orfeu da Conceição (1956). English lyrics were added by Gene Lees.

== Notable recordings ==
- Elizete Cardoso – Noturno (1957)
- Sylvia Telles – Caricia (1957)
- Charlie Byrd – Brazilian Byrd (1965)
- Vic Damone – Stay with Me (1966)
- Antônio Carlos Jobim – A Certain Mr. Jobim (1967), Terra Brasilis (1980)
- Jack Wilson – Song for My Daughter (1969).
- Frank Sinatra and Antônio Carlos Jobim – Sinatra & Company (rec. 1969, released 1971)
- Vinicius de Moraes – En La Fusa con Maria Creuza y Toquinho (1970).
- Tony Bennett – The Good Things in Life (1972).
- Dick Farney – Noite (1981)
- Sylvia Syms – Syms by Sinatra (1982) (orchestrated by Frank Sinatra)
- Kenny Burrell – Groovin' High (1984)
- Mark Murphy – Brazil Songs (1984).
- Gal Costa – Gal Costa Canta Tom Jobim ao Vivo (1999).
- Toninho Horta – To Jobim with Love (2008).

== See also ==
- List of Brazilian songs
