= Adalberto Bravo =

- Born: Adalberto H Bravo Jr. February 1, 1965
- Origin: Brooklyn, New York, U.S.
- Died: April 19, 2026 (aged 61)
- Genres: Latin jazz; salsa; merengue; bolero
- Occupations: Musician; songwriter; record producer
- Instruments: Guitar; piano; bass; mandolin; cuatro
- Years active: 1980s–2026
- Label: Bravo Records
- Website: www.bravoproductionent.com

Adalberto Bravo (February 1, 1965 – April 19, 2026), was an American musician, bandleader, composer, and multi-instrumentalist.

== Early life ==
Bravo was born in Brooklyn, New York to parents of Puerto Rican and Venezuelan heritage. He graduated from Hillcrest High School in 1983. Bravo also spent much of his time living in Venezuela and Puerto Rico to study music. In the early 1980s, Bravo and his family moved to Miami, Florida, eventually relocating to Orlando, where he continued his music studies at University of Central Florida, mastering his skills in guitar, piano, and composing/arranging. Bravo later recorded his first album, Cuanto Te Amo, in 1986 under Lybel Records.

== Career ==
Throughout the late 1980s and early 1990s, Bravo collaborated with numerous artists, including Tito Puente, Carlos Santana, and performed with other bands such as El Gran Combo de Puerto Rico and Son By Four. Bravo also formed his own band, "Adalberto Bravo y su Orquesta La Identidad" (later shortened to remove "La Identidad" from its name to avoid confusion with a similarly-named Colombian band), backing artists such as Tito Nieves, Oscar D'León, Melina León, Gisselle, Frankie Negron, Jose Feliciano, and many others during their performances in Florida. Bravo and his band released their first CD, Te Quiero, in March 2000. In 2004, Bravo released his second solo guitar album, Smooth Passions, consisting of his cover versions of compositions by Antônio Carlos Jobim and Ruben Fuentes among others. Bravo returned to recording in 2014, releasing a tribute album to the late Cheo Feliciano, who died earlier that year. Bravo continued performing with his band and as a solo guitarist in numerous venues and events throughout Central Florida, including the House of Blues and Bongos Cuban Cafe at Walt Disney World until his retirement due to health issues in early 2026.

== Personal life ==
=== Marriage and family ===
Bravo has been married to Maria Rivera since 2002 until his death in 2026, and has resided in Kissimmee, Florida. Bravo's two younger brothers, Richard and Jerry, are also musicians that have shared the stage with numerous A-list celebrity artists.

=== Death ===
Bravo died on April 19, 2026 at the age of 61 due to complications from late-stage prostate cancer.

== Discography ==
- 1986: Cuanto Te Amo
- 2000: Te Quiero
- 2004: Smooth Passions
- 2014: Recordando a Cheo Feliciano
