= Don't Ever Go Away (Por Causa de Você) =

1957 song by Antônio Carlos Jobim

"Don't Ever Go Away (Por Causa de Você)" aka "Por Causa de Você (Because of You)" is a bossa nova song composed in 1957 by Antônio Carlos Jobim, with original lyrics by Dolores Duran. English lyrics were later added by Ray Gilbert. A version in French was written by Serge Rohde.

== Background ==
Bossa nova historian Ruy Castro relates a story of how Jobim and Duran wrote the song: "The two of them had met by chance at Rádio Nacional, and Jobim had shown her the song, which didn't yet have any lyrics--Vinícius de Moraes was supposed to be taking care of that. When Dolores heard the music, she took her eyebrow pencil out of her pocket, rapidly scribbled a few lines on a paper napkin, and showed them to Jobim. He liked them and sighed: 'What do you think this music would sound like with Sinatra?'"

As it turned out, Frank Sinatra recorded the song with Jobim in 1969, under the title "Don't Ever Go Away (Por Causa de Você), which appeared on his album Sinatra & Company (1971).

The first recording of the song was in 1957 by Sylvia Telles. In 1960, she recorded the first version in French as "Gardez Moi Pour Toujours."

== Recorded versions ==
- Sylvia Telles - Carícia (1957) and Amor em Hi-Fi (1960)
- Dolores Duran - Dolores Duran Canta Para Você Dançar... (1957)
- Maysa - Convite para ouvir Maysa n. 2 (1958)
- Agostinho dos Santos - Antonio Carlos Jobim e Fernando Cesar na voz de Agostinho dos Santos (1958)
- Antônio Carlos Jobim - A Certain Mr. Jobim (1967), and Inédito (1987)
- Frank Sinatra & Antônio Carlos Jobim - Sinatra & Company (rec. 1969, released 1971)
- Baden Powell - Solitude on Guitar (1971)
- Ella Fitzgerald - Ella Abraça Jobim (1981) - released on the original LP but left off the 1991 CD version
- Paulinho Nogueira - Tom Jobim – Retrospectiva (1981)
- Eliane Elias - Eliane Elias Plays Jobim (1990) - instrumental and vocal versions
- Paul Winter with Oscar Castro-Neves - Brazilian Days (1998)
- Gal Costa - Gal Costa Canta Tom Jobim Ao Vivo (1999)
- Rosa Passos & Ron Carter - Entre Amigos (2003)
- Vanessa da Mata - Vanessa da Mata Canta Tom Jobim (2013)
- Carminho - Carminho canta Tom Jobim (2016)
