= Forró dos Cumpadre =

Humorous song from Minas Gerais, Brazil

Song
- Released: 1970
- Genre: Forró
- Songwriters: Nelio Guerson; Carlos Guerson

Forró dos Cumpadre is a song from Minas Gerais, Brazil. It started as a joke in 1970 and was recorded in one take without a rehearsal. It became a hit in the Steel Valley, Governador Valadares.

Forró Dos Cumpadre is a humorous song and odd compared with the other kinds of forró in Brazil. It is played with two acoustic guitars instead of accordion, a zabumba, and a metal triangle, and talks about nonsense things imitating animals. The music is based on the culture of the region.

The authors of this Brazilian music, Nelio Guerson and Carlos Guerson, members of The Fire Boys, a band from Governador Valadares, have been covered by newspapers, radios stations and television stations
