= One Note Samba =

Bossa nova song composed by Antonio Carlos Jobim

"Samba de uma Nota Só"

Song
- Genre: Bossa nova, jazz standard
- Composer: Antônio Carlos Jobim
- Lyricists: Newton Mendonça (Portuguese); Jon Hendricks (English)

"Samba de uma Nota Só", known in English as "One Note Samba", is a bossa nova and jazz standard song composed by Antônio Carlos Jobim with Portuguese lyrics by Newton Mendonça. The English lyrics were written by Jon Hendricks. It was first recorded by João Gilberto in 1960 for his album O Amor, o Sorriso e a Flor.

The song title refers to the main melody line, which at first consists of a long series of notes of a single tone (typically D, as played in the key of G) played over a descending chord progression in a bossa nova rhythm. The first eight measures consist of D, followed by four measures of G, and then four measures of D. This is followed by eight measures of a more conventional, scalar melody line.

This song first reached a wide audience on the Grammy-winning bossa nova LP Jazz Samba (Getz/Byrd/Betts), which reached the number one spot on the Billboard 200 in 1963. Another well-known release is the Sergio Mendes-Brasil '66 version, in medley with "Spanish Flea".

The song was featured in a prominent scene of "A Man Without a Skin", a 1963 episode of Naked City. The song was mentioned in the song "Astrud" by Basia. Rogério Skylab parodied the song as "Samba de uma Nota Só ao Contrário" on his 2009 live album Skylab IX.

== Notable recordings ==
- João Gilberto – The Legendary Joao Gilberto (1960)
- Sylvia Telles – Amor em Hi–Fi (1960)
- Dizzy Gillespie – New Wave (1962)
- Stan Getz and Charlie Byrd – Jazz Samba (1962)
- Quincy Jones – Big Band Bossa Nova (1962)
- Herbie Mann – Brazil, Bossa Nova & Blues (1962)
- Herbie Mann and Tom Jobim – Do the Bossa Nova with Herbie Mann (1962)
- Eydie Gormé – Blame It on the Bossa Nova (1963)
- Antônio Carlos Jobim – The Composer of Desafinado, Plays (1963)
- Aliza Kashi – A Internacional Aliza Kashi (1963)
- Lambert, Hendricks & Bavan – "Recorded "Live" at Basin Street East" (1963)
- Peggy Lee - I'm A Woman (1963)
- Clare Fischer – So Danço Samba (1964)
- Preben Kaas and Jørgen Ryg – Hvad Skal Vi Med Kvinder (1964)
- Modern Jazz Quartet and Laurindo Almeida on Collaboration (1964)
- June Christy – Something Broadway, Something Latin (1965)
- Percy Faith – Latin Themes for Young Lovers (1965)
- Vince Guaraldi and Bola Sete — The Navy Swings (1965)
- Sérgio Mendes – Herb Alpert Presents Sérgio Mendes & Brasil '66 (1966)
- Cliff Richard – Kinda Latin (1966)
- Charlie Byrd – More Brazilian Byrd (1967)
- Blossom Dearie – Sweet Blossom Dearie (1967)
- Perrey and Kingsley – Kaleidoscopic Vibrations: Spotlight on the Moog (1967)
- Caterina Valente – Caterina Valente Live 1968
- Duke Ellington – Alive and Rare (1969)
- Nara Leão – Dez Anos Depois (1971)
- Frank Sinatra and Antonio Carlos Jobim – Sinatra & Company (1971)
- Joe Pass and Ella Fitzgerald – Fitzgerald and Pass... Again (1976)
- Barbra Streisand (in a medley with "Johnny One Note") – Barbra Streisand...And Other Musical Instruments (1973)
- Ella Fitzgerald – Ella Abraça Jobim, Pablo (1981)
- Kate Ceberano – Kate Ceberano and her Septet (1986)
- Rosemary Clooney & John Pizzarelli – Brazil (2000)
- Eumir Deodato & Barbara Mendes – soundtrack from Bossa Nova (2000)
- Al Jarreau – Expressions (2001)
- Adalberto Bravo – Smooth Passions (2004)
- Royce Campbell – A Tribute to Charlie Byrd (2004)
- Sitti Navarro – Café Bossa (2006)
- Olivia Ong – A Girl Meets BossaNova 2 (2006)
- The Postmarks – By the Numbers (2008)
- Stacey Kent – The Changing Lights (2013)

== See also ==
- List of bossa nova standards
