= Carol Saboya =

Brazilian jazz singer (born 1975)

- Born: Carol Saboya; March 10, 1975
- Genre: Jazz music
- Instrument: Vocals
- Years active: 1983–present

Carol Saboya (March 10, 1975) is a Brazilian jazz singer. She is the daughter of composer Antônio Adolfo.

== Life ==
Saboya first participated in the compact cassette A menina e a TV by Miéle at the age of eight. Other appearances followed on albums by musicians Erasmo Carlos and Ângela Ro Ro. Beside this she participated in the musical Verde que te quero ver. She studied singing in the United States and around this time was credited on Sérgio Mendes' Brasileiro. Back in Brazil she collaborated with pianist Joyce Collin and Aldir Blanc, recording the song "Carta de pedra at Canecã". Saboya released her debut album, Dança da voz, in 1998. The album was produced by Almir Chediak and brought her that year the Sharp Award for Best Brazilian New Female Vocalist. In 1999 she and guitarist Nelson Faria backed Tom Jobim on his Janelas abertas. After recording her second album, Sessão Passatempo, in 2000, Saboya performed at the Brazilian Music Festival. Her next albums were Presente (2003) and Antonio Adolfo e Carol Saboya ao vivo/live (2007), the latter recorded in Festival Miami. She covered songs by Mário Sève on her 2008 album Chão aberto and collaborated with Adolfo on his Lá e Cá, which fuses Brazilian and American standards by Jobim, Cole Porter and other artists. In 2012 her Belezas – The Music of Ivan Lins and Milton Nascimento was released for the first time in the US. The album was produced and arranged by Adolfo. The bilingual recording was sung in Portuguese and English. Comprising songs by Ivan Lins and Milton Nascimento, Belezas features acoustic and electric guitarist Claudio Spiewak, bassist Jorge Helder, drummer and percussionist Rafael Barata, soprano and tenor saxophonist Dave Liebman, and harmonicist Hendrik Meurkens.

== Awards ==
- Best Brazilian New Female Vocalist – Sharp Award – 1998
- Tabaiba de Oro – Spain Brazilian International Press Award – 2007
