= Luiz Brasil =

Brazilian guitarist

Luiz Brasil (born Luiz Alberto Brasil de Carvalho in Salvador, Bahia, Brazil, on April 21, 1954) is a Brazilian guitarist. He is best known as a guitarist who has performed with Caetano Veloso, Gilberto Gil, Gal Costa, Nando Reis, Cássia Eller, and many other vocalists.

He was born into a musical family: his mother played piano, his brothers Jorge and Marcelo became drummers, and his brother Mou became a jazz guitarist. More recently, his daughter Tamima Brasil is a percussionist.

His early career included stints as guitarist with the rock group Mar Revolto, Scorpius (1970–1974), Zezé Motta (1978–1980), and the carnaval Trio elétrico of Armandinho. More recently he has performed as a multi-instrumentalist (including mandolin and percussion instruments), arranger, composer, teacher, and occasional singer. His recent collaborators include Jaques Morelenbaum, Ryuichi Sakamoto, Jussara Silveira, and Rita Ribeiro.

His first solo album was Brasilêru, released in 2005. His second solo album, Beira, was released in 2011.
