= Meditation (Antônio Carlos Jobim song) =

Jazz standard by Antônio Carlos Jobim and Newton Mendonça

"Meditação"

Song
- Language: Portuguese
- English title: Meditation
- Genre: Bossa nova; Jazz standard
- Composers: Antônio Carlos Jobim; Newton Mendonça
- Lyricists: Norman Gimbel (English); Saukki (Finnish)

"Meditation" ("Meditação" in Portuguese) is a bossa nova and jazz standard song composed by Antônio Carlos Jobim and Newton Mendonça. The English version has lyrics by Norman Gimbel. In Finland, the song was recorded in 1963 by Olavi Virta with lyrics by Saukki under the title "Hymy, kukka ja rakkaus". Erkki Liikanen recorded the song in 1967 with lyrics by Aarno Raninen under the title "Taas on hiljaisuus".

== Recordings ==
- Maysa on Maysa é Maysa... é Maysa, é Maysa! (1959)
- João Gilberto on O Amor, o Sorriso e a Flor (1960)
- Cal Tjader on Cal Tjader Plays the Contemporary Music of Mexico and Brazil (1962)
- Herbie Mann on Right Now! (Atlantic 1962)
- Charlie Byrd on Bossa Nova Pelos Passaros (Riverside 1962)
- Antônio Carlos Jobim on The Composer of Desafinado, Plays (1963)
- Pat Boone released this song as a single in 1963, reaching number 91 on the Billboard Hot 100, and number 70 on Cash Box.
- Cliff Richard on Kinda Latin (Columbia EMI, 1965)
- Doris Day on Latin for Lovers (1965)
- Astrud Gilberto on The Astrud Gilberto Album (1965)
- Vic Damone on Stay with Me (1966)
- Andy Williams on The Shadow of Your Smile (1966)
- Frank Sinatra on the album Francis Albert Sinatra & Antonio Carlos Jobim (1967)
- Claudine Longet recorded the song for her A&M debut album Claudine (1967), and was her first single for the label. This recording reached #98 on the Hot 100.
- Blossom Dearie recorded the song for her 1967 album Soon It's Gonna Rain
- Jack Jones; featured as the B-side of Kapp 45 Far Away (1968)
- Dexter Gordon on More Power! (Prestige 1969)
- Jazz Guitarist Joe Pass on Intercontinental (1970),and on Meditation: Solo Guitar (Pablo 2002)
- Johnny Hartman on I've Been There (1973)
- Antônio Carlos Jobim & Ana Caram on Rio After Dark (Chesky Records 1989)
- Adalberto Bravo on Smooth Passions (2004)
- Nellie McKay recorded the song for her 2009 album Normal as Blueberry Pie – A Tribute to Doris Day
- Jazz pianist Gene Harris on Another Night in London (2010)

== Charts ==
Pat Boone version

Chart (1960)	Peak position
US Billboard Hot 100	91
US Cash Box	70

Claudine Longet version

Chart (1967)	Peak position
US Billboard Hot 100	98

== See also ==
- List of bossa nova standards
