= Corcovado (song) =

1960 bossa nova song by Antônio Carlos Jobim

"Quiet Nights Of Quiet Stars (Corcovado)"

Song by Antonio Carlos Jobim
- Released: 1960
- Genre: Bossa nova, jazz
- Length: 2:25
- Songwriter: Antônio Carlos Jobim

"Corcovado" (known in English as "Quiet Nights of Quiet Stars") is a bossa nova song and jazz standard written by Antônio Carlos Jobim in 1960. English lyrics were later written by Gene Lees. The Portuguese title refers to the Corcovado mountain in Rio de Janeiro.

Tony Bennett recorded the first popular English cover of "Quiet Nights" with new lyrics by Buddy Kaye in 1963. Numerous English cover recordings then followed, sometimes credited to Lees and/or Kaye and Lees, including the Andy Williams recording of the song with English lyrics, reaching number 92 in the Billboard Hot 100 and number 18 in the Hot Adult Contemporary Tracks chart in 1965. Also receiving air-play, contemporaneously with Andy Williams' recording of "Quiet Nights," was Kitty Kallen's version. Her album, titled "Quiet Nights," was released by 20th Century-Fox Records in 1964.

== Notable recordings ==
It is now considered a jazz standard, having been recorded on albums by:

- João Gilberto – O Amor, o Sorriso e a Flor (1960)
- Sylvia Telles – Amor em Hi-Fi (1960)
- Cannonball Adderley and Sérgio Mendes – Cannonball's Bossa Nova (1962)
- Miles Davis – Quiet Nights (1962)
- Stan Getz, Antônio Carlos Jobim, João Gilberto and Astrud Gilberto – Getz/Gilberto (1963)
- Tony Bennett – I Wanna Be Around... (1963)
- Charlie Byrd – Brazilian Byrd (1964)
- Oscar Peterson – We Get Requests (1964), and Travelin' On (1968)
- Blossom Dearie – May I Come In? (1964)
- Robert Goulet – My Love Forgive Me (1964)
- Nancy Wilson – How Glad I Am (1964)
- Sarah Vaughan – Viva! Vaughan (Remastered) (1965)
- Doris Day – Latin for Lovers (1965)
- Henry Mancini – The Latin Sound of Henry Mancini (1965)
- Grant Green – I Want to Hold Your Hand (1965)
- Cliff Richard – Kinda Latin (1965)
- Monica Zetterlund — Ett lingonris som satts i cocktailglas (1965)
- Tommy Leonetti – Trombones, Guitars and Me (1966)
- Vic Damone – Stay with Me (1966)
- Frank Sinatra and Antônio Carlos Jobim – Francis Albert Sinatra & Antonio Carlos Jobim (1967)
- Engelbert Humperdinck – Release Me (1967)
- Ella Fitzgerald – Ella Abraça Jobim (1981)
- Everything but the Girl – Red Hot + Rio (1996)
- Stacey Kent and Jim Tomlinson – The Lyric (2005)
- Theresa Sokyrka – These Old Charms (2005)
- Art Garfunkel – Some Enchanted Evening (2007)
- Queen Latifah – Trav'lin' Light (2007)
- Diana Krall – Quiet Nights (2009)
- Andrea Bocelli with Nelly Furtado – Passione (2013)

== See also ==
- List of bossa nova standards
