= Paula Morelenbaum =

Brazilian singer (born 1962)

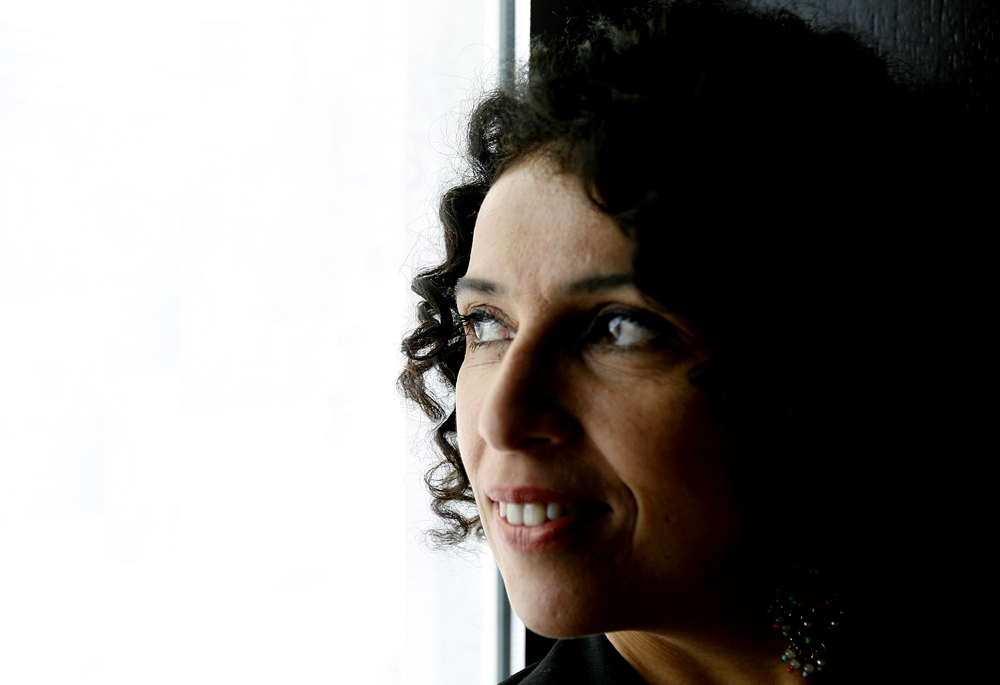
- Born: Regina Paula Martins; July 31, 1962 (age 64); Rio de Janeiro, Brazil
- Occupation: Singer
- Years active: 1981–present
- Spouse: Jaques Morelenbaum

Regina Paula Martins Morelenbaum (Portuguese pronunciation: [ˈpawlɐ moɾelẽˈbɐ̃w], born July 31, 1962) is a Brazilian singer, born in Rio de Janeiro. She and her husband Jaques Morelenbaum were in the band that toured with Antonio Carlos Jobim from 1984 to 1994.

In addition to Jobim's group, Paula Morelenbaum has been part of Quarteto Jobim-Morelenbaum, with her husband Jaques, Jobim's son Paulo, and his son Daniel. She has also been in the trio Morelenbaum2/Sakamoto, also with her husband, and with Japanese composer/keyboardist Ryuichi Sakamoto.

Her daughter, Dora Morelenbaum, is also a musician. She's a member of Bala Desejo and has a solo career, as well.

== Selected discography ==
- Céu da Boca – Céu da Boca, 1981 LP (Polygram)
- show habia, Japan with A.C. JOBIM,1987
- Céu da Boca – Baratotal, 1982 LP (Polygram)
- Nova Banda – Amazonas Família Jobim 1991 (MoviePlay/Som Livre)
- Paula Morelenbaum – Paula Morelenbaum, 1992 (Independente/Camerati)
- Quarteto Jobim-Morelenbaum – Quarteto Jobim-Morelenbaum, 1999 (Velas/Sony Music)
- Céu da Boca – Millennium, 2000 (Universal Music)
- Morelenbaum²/Sakamoto – Casa, 2001 (Kab/Universal Music)
- Morelenbaum²/Sakamoto – Live in Tokyo 2001, 2001 (Warner Music Japan)
- Morelenbaum²/Sakamoto – A Day in New York, 2003 (Kab/Universal Music/Sony Classical)
- Paula Morelenbaum – Berimbaum, 2004 (Mirante/Farol Musica/Universal Music)
- Paula Morelenbaum – Telecoteco, 2008
- SWR Bigband & Paula Morelenbaum – Bossarenova, 2009
- Paula & Donato – Água, 2010
