= Jaques Morelenbaum =

Brazilian instrumentalist, composer, and conductor

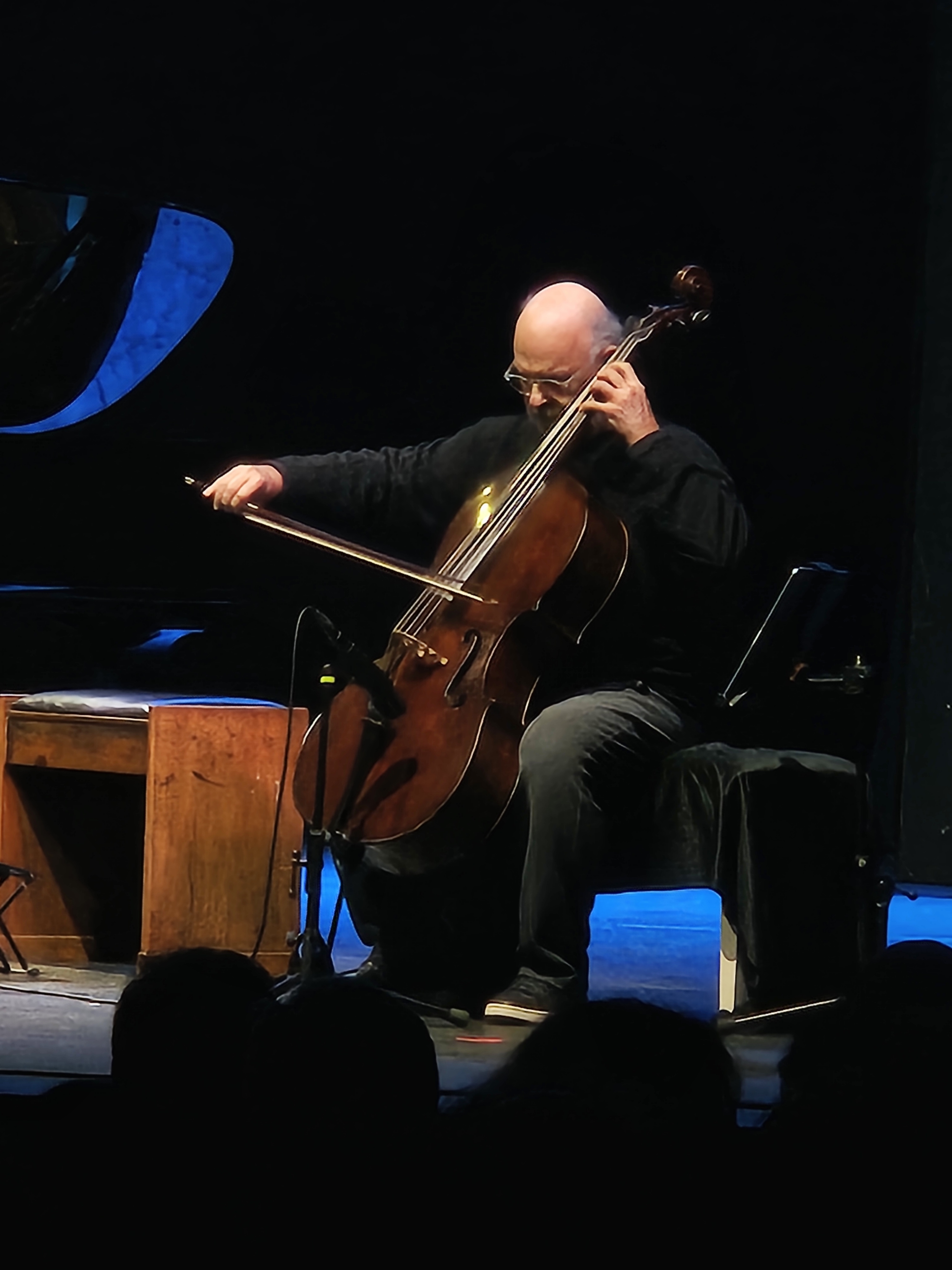
Jaques Morelenbaum 2025

Jaques Morelenbaum ((Portuguese pronunciation: [ˈʒakiz moɾelẽˈbɐ̃w]) born 18 May 1954) is a Brazilian instrumentalist, arranger, conductor, composer and music producer.

Morelenbaum was born in Rio de Janeiro, the son of conductor Henrique Morelenbaum and piano teacher Sarah Morelenbaum. His siblings are Lucia Morelenbaum, clarinetist in the Brazilian Symphony Orchestra, and Eduardo Morelenbaum, conductor, arranger and instrumentalist. He is married to singer Paula Morelenbaum.

He started his musical career as part of the group A Barca do Sol, and participated in the Nova Banda that performed live with Antonio Carlos Jobim and in recordings that led to a Grammy win for the CD Antonio Brasileiro. As a cellist, he studied music in Brazil and later attended the New England Conservatory of Music. In 1995, with Paula Morelenbaum, Paulo Jobim and Daniel Jobim he created the Quarteto Jobim Morelenbaum. The group has toured Europe several times, including an appearance at the Expo'98 held in Lisbon. They have also toured the United States and Brazil, and have recorded a CD (Quarteto Jobim Morelenbaum).

== Nordeste Já (Northeast Now) ==
Morelenbaum sang in the choir of the Brazilian equivalent of We Are the World, the hit American song that raised funds for African relief via USA for Africa. The project Nordeste Já (1985), embraced the cause of those affected by the drought in Northeastern Brazil. 155 voices joined in the recording of the songs Chega de mágoa and Seca d´água. While he was praised for his individual interpretations, he was also criticized for failing to harmonize the voices and their framework in chorus.

As an arranger, he worked alongside Tom Jobim (Passarim, O tempo e o vento, Tom Jobim: inédito and Antônio Brasileiro), Caetano Veloso (Circuladô, Circuladô vivo, Fina estampa', Fina estampa, ao vivo, Tieta do agreste, Prenda minha, Livro and Homaggio a Fellini e Giulieta), Gal Costa (Mina d'água do meu canto), Paula Morelenbaum, Ivan Lins, Barão Vermelho and Skank, among others, as well as in the album Piazzollando (honoring the work of Ástor Piazzolla) in which Morelenbaum also served as instrumentalist, conductor, and producer. The disc was considered by Argentina as one of the 10 best of 1992. He wrote arrangements for records by Marisa Monte and Carlinhos Brown and for an acoustic disc by the Brazilian rock group Titãs, which sold 1.5 million copies.

With Gilberto Gil and Bem Gil, Morelenbaum toured the US in March 2010 as "The String Concert featuring Jacques Morelenbaum & Bem Gil."

== International partners ==
Morelenbaum has provided musical arrangements for works by international artists such as Portuguese band Madredeus, Portuguese singer Dulce Pontes, Japanese group Gontiti, Angolan composer Paulo Flores, Scottish/American musician David Byrne, Cape Verdean singer Cesária Évora and pianist and composer Ryuichi Sakamoto, among others. One of his best known works is Transparente, in partnership with Mariza. In 2001, he participated as cellist on the recording of the DVD All this time, by Sting. In 2008, he produced and arranged for Mexican singer Julieta Venegas in MTV Unplugged. In 2010, he was the arranger for Omar Sosa's Ceremony album (World Village WVF479042) with the NDR Bigband and in 2016, he took part in Suite Três Rios, released by Dan Costa (Composer) and in Eros, featuring Paolo Fresu, Omar Sosa and Natacha Atlas.

== Movies ==
Morelenbaum appears alongside Caetano Veloso in a cameo role in Talk to Her (Spanish: Hable con ella), by Pedro Almodóvar. In partnership with Antonio Pinto, he composed the soundtrack to the film Central Station (Portuguese: Central do Brasil) which received the Prêmio Sharp (Sharp Award) for Best Soundtrack. Orfeu, Tieta of Agreste, and O Quatrilho are among his other works for the cinema.

In addition, he conducted the symphony orchestras of Bahia and Brasília in some presentations.

As part of the Morelenbaum/Sakamoto ensemble, he released the CD Casa in 2002 with Paula Morelenbaum, guitarist Luiz Brasil, and pianist Ryuichi Sakamoto. The project was recorded at the house of Tom Jobim, composer of all the songs on the disc. They performed in jazz festivals at Montreux, Vienna, Lisbon, Porto, Rome, and Milan, among others, and in 2003 they released a live album, A Day in New York.
