= Dolores Duran =

Brazilian singer and songwriter

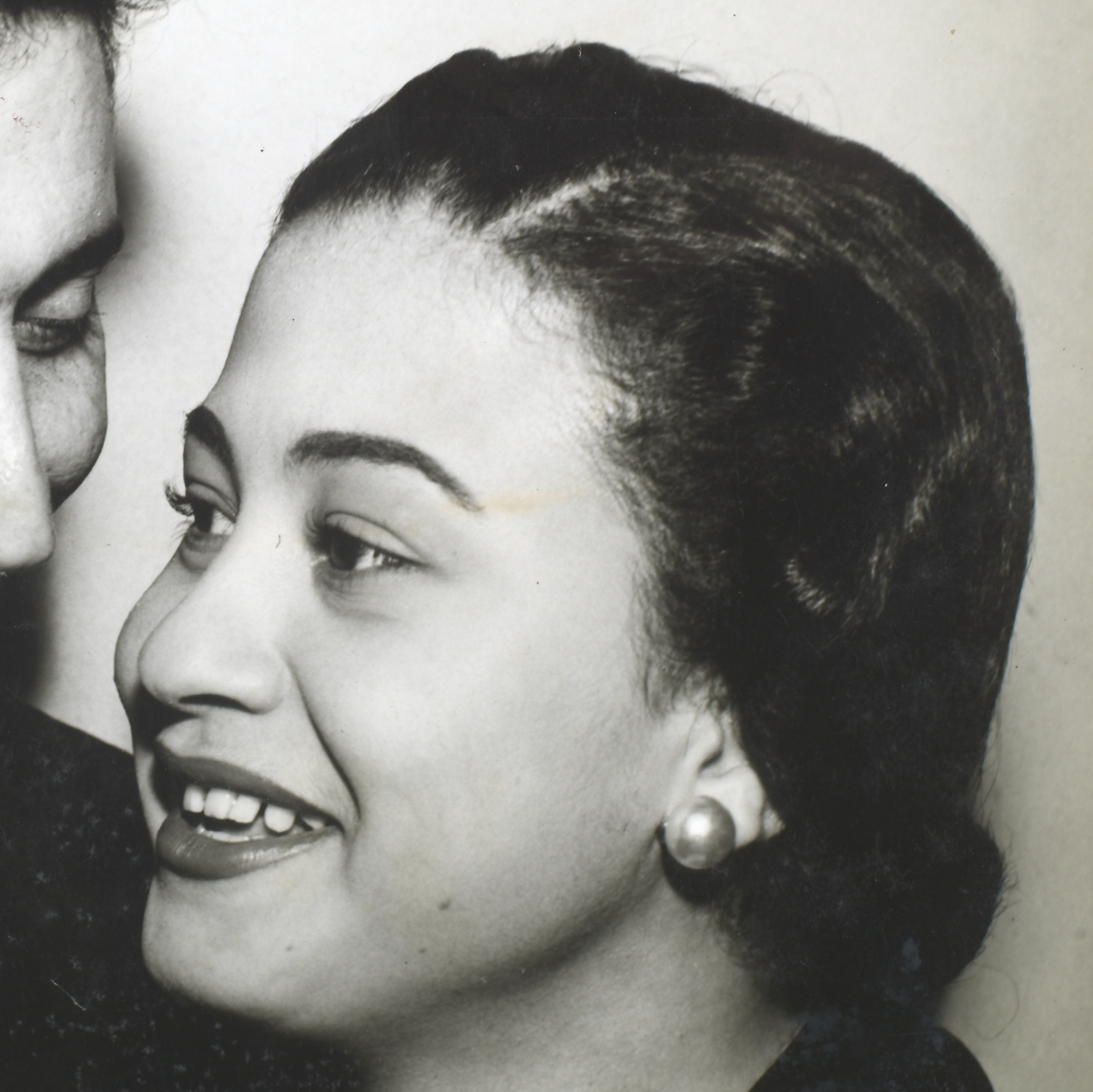
- Macedo Neto and Dolores Duran (1955)

Background information
- Born: Adiléia Silva da Rocha; 7 June 1930; Rio de Janeiro, Brazil
- Died: 24 October 1959 (aged 29)

Dolores Duran (Adiléia Silva da Rocha; 7 June 1930 – 24 October 1959) was a Brazilian singer and songwriter.

== Life ==
Adiléia Silva da Rocha was born on 7 June 1930 in Rio de Janeiro, Brazil. During childhood, she suffered from rheumatic fever that left serious heart complications. At around age 10, she won the singing contest Calouros em Desfile on Rádio Tupi, hosted by Ary Barroso, which helped launch her artistic career.

=== Career ===
By her mid-teens, she began performing professionally on Rádio Tupi and in theater productions at Teatro Carlos Gomes to support her family following her father's passing.

She adopted the stage name Dolores Duran inspired by American actress Dolores Moran, and began recording in the 1950s. She sang in Italian, French, English and Portuguese.

=== Death ===
After a late-night performance at the Little Club and subsequent socializing, Dolores Duran returned home in the early hours of 24 October 1959. Following a light-hearted remark to her housemaid that she was so tired she might "sleep until I die," she died in her sleep from a heart attack at age 29.

== Songs ==
- "Por Causa de Você (Don't Ever Go Away)"
- "Estrada do Sol"
- "Se É Por Falta de Adeus"
- "Fim de Caso"
- "A Noite do Meu Bem"
- "Solidão"
- "Ternura Antiga"
- "Castigo"
- "Pela Rua"
- "Idéias Erradas"
- "Quem Sou Eu"
- "Se Eu Tiver"
