= Gene Lees =

Canadian music critic, biographer, lyricist, and journalist

- Born: Frederick Eugene John Lees; February 8, 1928; Hamilton, Ontario, Canada
- Died: April 22, 2010 (aged 82); Ojai, California, U.S.
- Occupations: Music critic; biographer; lyricist; journalist
- Spouses: Micheline Ducreux (m. 1956) Janet Suttle (m. 1971)
- Children: Philip Lees (1957-)

Frederick Eugene John Lees (February 8, 1928 – April 22, 2010) was a Canadian music critic, biographer, lyricist, and journalist. Lees worked as a newspaper journalist in his native Canada before moving to the United States, where he was a music critic and lyricist. His lyrics for Antonio Carlos Jobim's "Corcovado" (released as "Quiet Nights of Quiet Stars"), have been recorded by such singers as Frank Sinatra, Peggy Lee, Queen Latifah, and Diana Krall.

== Biography ==
Born in Hamilton, Ontario, Canada, Lees was the eldest of four children born to Harold Lees, a violinist, and Dorothy Flatman. His sister, Victoria Lees, is the former Secretary General of Montreal's McGill University, and his brother, David Lees, is an investigative journalist and science writer.

Beginning his writing career as a newspaper reporter in his native Canada, between 1948 and 1955 Lees contributed to The Hamilton Spectator, the Toronto Telegram, and the Montreal Star, and first worked as a music critic in the United States for the Louisville (Kentucky) Times between 1955 and 1959 and was editor of the jazz magazine Down Beat between 1959 and 1962.

As a freelance writer, Lees wrote for the American high fidelity magazines Stereo Review and High Fidelity (often using his column to defend jazz and older popular music while blasting "that rock junk"), the Canadian magazine Maclean's, the Toronto Star, the Toronto Globe and Mail, and The New York Times.

Lees wrote nearly one hundred liner notes for artists as diverse as Stan Getz, John Coltrane, George Barnes (musician), and Quincy Jones. His first novel And Sleep Until Noon was published in 1967. The second, Song Lake Summer, was published in 2008.

Lees won the first of five ASCAP-Deems Taylor Awards in 1978 for a series of articles published in High Fidelity about US music. Lees' famous monthly Jazzletter was established in 1981, and contains musical criticism by Lees and others.

== Author ==
Lees wrote a rhyming dictionary in the 1980s, and published three compilations of pieces from his Jazzletter: Singers and the Song (1987), Meet Me at Jim & Andy's (1988), and Waiting for Dizzy (1991). As a biographer, Lees has written about Oscar Peterson, the partnership of Alan Jay Lerner and Frederick Loewe, Woody Herman, and has collaborated with Henry Mancini on Mancini's autobiography Did They Mention the Music? (1989). Lees wrote about racism in jazz music in Cats of Any Color: Jazz Black and White (1994) and on the effect of racism on the careers of Dizzy Gillespie, Clark Terry, Milt Jackson and Nat King Cole in You Can't Steal a Gift: Dizzy, Clark, Milt and Nat (2001). A memoir entitled Friends Along the Way: A Journey Through Jazz was published in 2003.

== Songwriting ==
Lees studied composition by correspondence with the Berklee College of Music, in the early 1960s and piano with Tony Aless and guitar with Oscar Castro-Neves in New York City. Lees became a lyricist in the 1960s, writing many of the English language lyrics for Bossa Nova songs, translating them from their original Portuguese. Lees wrote the lyrics for the Antonio Carlos Jobim songs; "Quiet Nights of Quiet Stars", "Agua de Beber", Someone to Light Up My Life", "Song of the Jet", "This Happy Madness" and "Dreamer". "Quiet Nights of Quiet Stars" (originally "Corcovado") has been recorded by many artists, artists as diverse as Frank Sinatra and Queen Latifah. "Quiet Nights" was Lees' first professional lyric, written on a bus going to Belo Horizonte, while Lees was on a United States State Department tour of South America with the Paul Winter Sextet, in 1961. Sinatra recorded four songs by Jobim with lyrics by Lees, Sinatra's recording of "Quiet Nights" (from Francis Albert Sinatra & Antonio Carlos Jobim, 1967), is considered by Lees to be definitive. Lees also wrote the lyrics for Charles Aznavour's, "Paris Is at Her Best in May" and "Venice Blue", and Aznavour's 1965 Broadway concert, The World of Charles Aznavour. Lees contributed lyrics to "Bridges" by Milton Nascimento; "Yesterday I Heard the Rain" by Armando Manzanero; and Bill Evans' "Waltz for Debby". Poems by Pope John Paul II were translated by Lees and recorded by Sarah Vaughan as part of a song cycle on her album The Planet Is Alive...Let it Live! (1984).

== Recording/broadcasting ==
Lees briefly returned to Canada in the early 1970s and recorded the LP Bridges: Gene Lees Sings the Gene Lees Songbook on Kanata Records, a Toronto company of which he became president from 1971 to 1974. Lees briefly had his own late-night CBC TV show in 1971, appeared as a commentator or singer on other CBC Toronto and Ottawa TV and radio series, and was host 1973–4 for Toronto radio station CKFM-FM's Gene Lees and Friends. Lees released a second album in 1998, Gene Lees Sings Gene Lees and recorded Leaves on the Water with pianist Roger Kellaway, and a third, "Yesterday I Heard The Rain", with a group of jazz all-stars led by Don Thompson.

== Death ==
Lees died of a stroke on April 22, 2010, at his home in Ojai, California. His wife, Janet, planned to continue the Jazzletter after his death, but this did not materialize. She died in 2013.

== Bibliography ==
- The Modern Rhyming Dictionary: How to Write Lyrics A Practical Guide to Lyric Writing for Songwriters and Poets (1987), ISBN 978-0-89524-317-1
- Meet Me at Jim & Andy's: Jazz Musicians and Their World (1988), ISBN 0-19-504611-0
- Waiting for Dizzy (1991), ISBN 0-19-505670-1
- Cats of Any Color: Jazz Black and White (1994), ISBN 978-0-19-508448-1
- You Can't Steal a Gift: Dizzy, Clark, Milt and Nat (2001), ISBN 0-8032-8034-3
- Friends Along the Way: A Journey Through Jazz (2003), ISBN 0-300-09967-3
- Arranging the Score: Portraits of the Great Arrangers (2000) ISBN 0304704881
- Singers & The Song (1987), ISBN 0-19-504293-X

=== Biographies ===
- Johnny Mercer – Portrait of Johnny: The Life of John Herndon Mercer (2004), ISBN 978-0-375-42060-3
- Oscar Peterson – Oscar Peterson: The Will to Swing (1988, revised 2000), ISBN 978-0-8154-1021-8
- Alan Jay Lerner, Frederick Loewe – Inventing Champagne: The Worlds of Lerner and Loewe (1990), ISBN 978-0-312-05136-5
- Woody Herman – Leader of the Band: The Life of Woody Herman (1995), ISBN 978-0-19-505671-6

=== Biographies as co–author ===
- Henry Mancini – Did They Mention the Music?: The Autobiography of Henry Mancini (1989), ISBN 978-0-8154-1175-8

=== Novel ===
- And Sleep Till Noon (1967)
- Song Lake Summer (2008), adapted for the screen by Steven Kunes (2009)

== Discography as a singer ==
- 1970s: Gene Lees Sings the Gene Lees Songbook
- 1998: Gene Lees Sings Gene Lees
- 1999: Leaves on the Water (with Roger Kellaway)
- 2000: Yesterday I Heard the Rain (with Don Thompson)
