= Grammy Award for Best Jazz Fusion Performance =

Honor presented to recording artists for quality jazz fusion performances

- Awarded for: Quality jazz fusion performances
- Country: United States
- Presented by: National Academy of Recording Arts and Sciences
- First award: 1980
- Final award: 1991
- Website: www.grammy.com

The Grammy Award for Best Jazz Fusion Performance was an award given to a song or album for excellence in the jazz fusion genre, a combination of rock and jazz. It was given at the Grammy Awards, which began in 1958 under the name Gramophone Awards. Honors in several categories are presented at the ceremony annually by the National Academy of Recording Arts and Sciences of the United States to "honor artistic achievement, technical proficiency and overall excellence in the recording industry, without regard to album sales or chart position".

Originally called the Grammy Award for Best Jazz Fusion Performance, Vocal or Instrumental, the award was first presented to the jazz band Weather Report at the 22nd Grammy Awards in 1980 for the album 8:30. In 1988, the category name changed to Best Jazz Fusion Performance and was moved to a newly created Fusion field. The category name was retired before the 33rd Grammy Awards (1992) with the addition of the award for Best Contemporary Jazz Performance (currently known as Best Contemporary Jazz Album).

The Pat Metheny Group holds the record for the most wins in this category, with a total of five. David Sanborn is the only other musician to win the award more than once, with two. The composition "Birdland", written by Weather Report, earned two musicians the award: The Manhattan Transfer won in 1981 and Quincy Jones won in 1991 for the version that appears on the compilation album Back on the Block. The award went to artists or groups originating from the United States each year it was presented. Lyle Mays holds the record for the most nominations, with eight (including five with the Pat Metheny group, two as a solo artist, and one shared with Metheny, of which five came in consecutive nominations between 1981 and 1985). The group Spyro Gyra holds the record for the most nominations without a win, with six. In 1990, Terri Lyne Carrington became the first solo female artist to be nominated for the award. No female artists were nominated in 1991, the final year the award was presented, making Carrington the only female solo artist to be nominated throughout the category's lifetime.

== Recipients ==
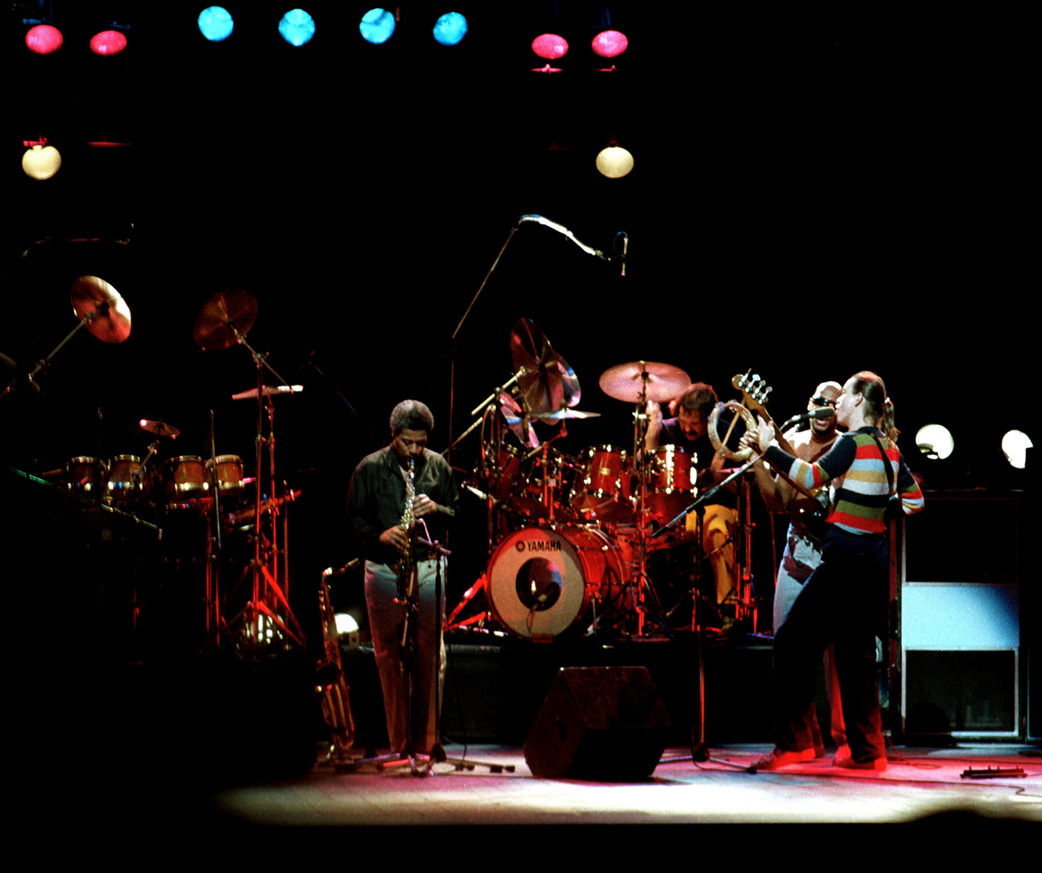
1980 award-winning group Weather Report, performing in 1981

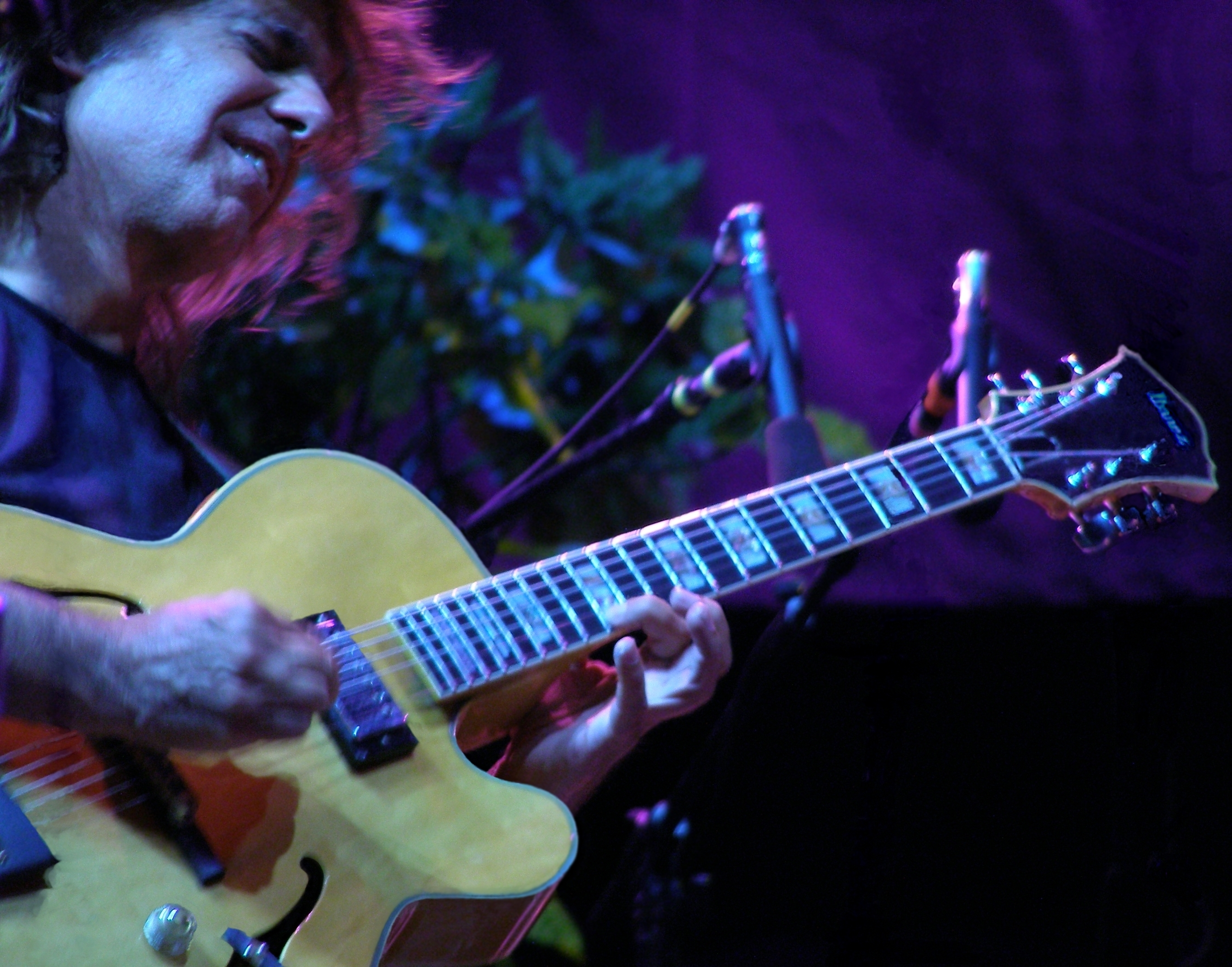
Five-time award recipient Pat Metheny performing in 2008

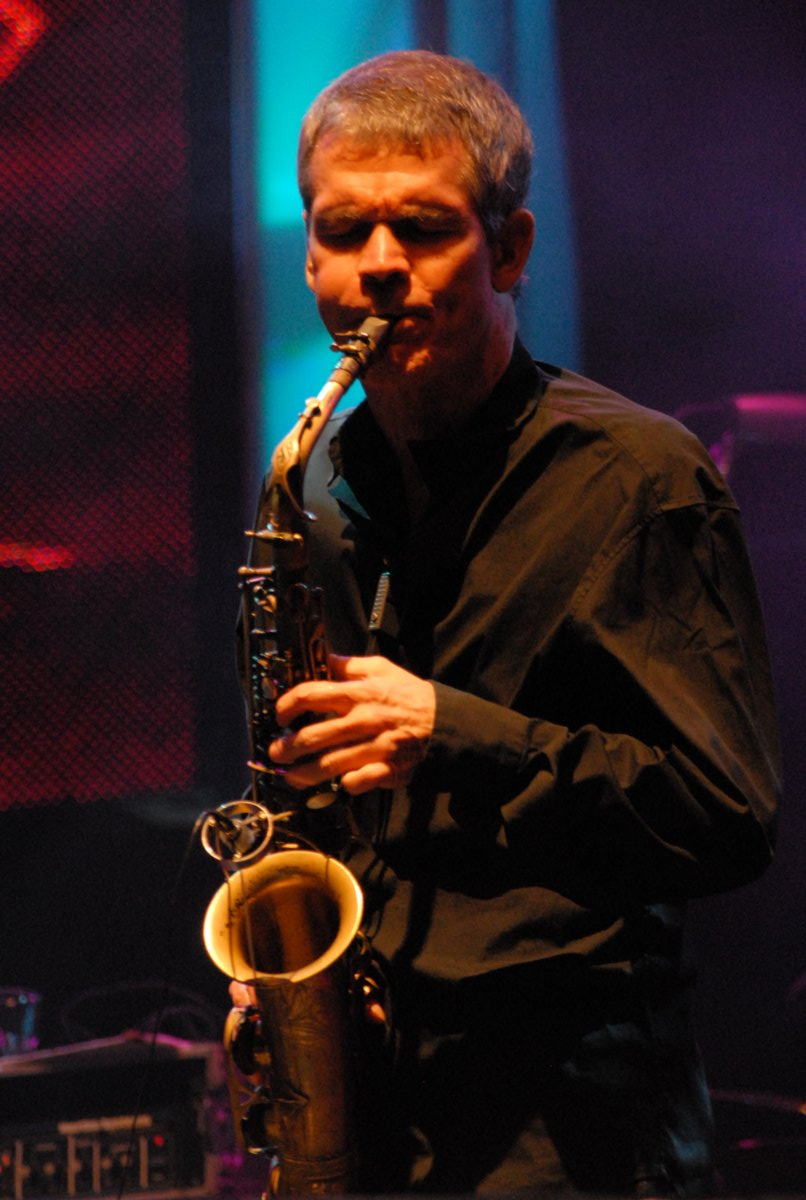
Two-time award winner David Sanborn performing in 2008

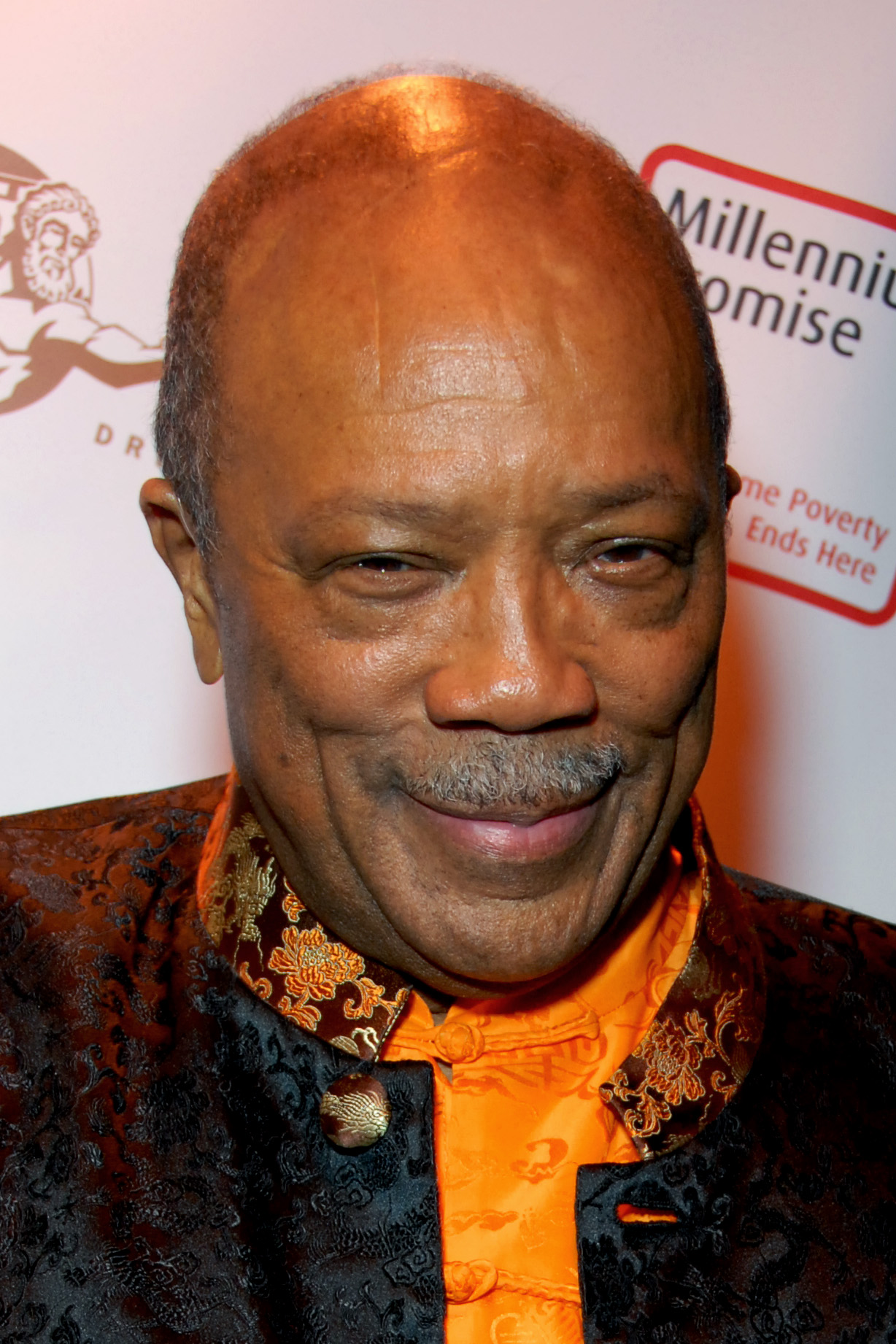
1991 award recipient Quincy Jones in 2008

Year^{[I]}	Performing artist(s)	Work	Nominees	Ref.
1980	Weather Report	8:30	George Benson – Livin' Inside Your Love; Chick Corea – Secret Agent; Don Sebesky – Three Works for Jazz Soloists and Symphony Orchestra; Stanley Turrentine – Betcha	
1981	The Manhattan Transfer	"Birdland"	Earl Klugh – Dreams Come True; Chuck Mangione – Fun and Games; Pat Metheny Group – American Garage; Spyro Gyra – Catching the Sun; Patrick Williams – An American Concerto	
1982	Grover Washington, Jr.	Winelight	Miles Davis - The Man with the Horn; Pat Metheny and Lyle Mays – As Falls Wichita, so Falls Wichita Falls; Tom Scott – Apple Juice; Weather Report – Night Passage	
1983	Pat Metheny Group	Offramp	David Sanborn – As We Speak; Tom Scott – Desire; Spyro Gyra – Incognito; Weather Report – Weather Report	
1984	Pat Metheny Group	Travels	Miles Davis – Star People; Spyro Gyra – City Kids; Yellowjackets – Mirage a Trois; Weather Report – Procession	
1985	Pat Metheny Group	First Circle	Miles Davis – Decoy; Earl Klugh – Wishful Thinking; David Sanborn – Backstreet; Spyro Gyra – Access All Areas	
1986	David Sanborn	Straight to the Heart	Miles Davis – You're Under Arrest; Wayne Shorter – Atlantis; Spyro Gyra – Alternating Currents; Stanley Jordan Group – Magic Touch; Weather Report – Sportin' Life	
1987	Bob James and David Sanborn	Double Vision	Chick Corea – The Chick Corea Elektric Band; Clare Fischer and His Latin Jazz Sextet – Free Fall; Lyle Mays – Lyle Mays; Lee Ritenour – Earth Run	
1988	Pat Metheny Group	Still Life (Talking)	George Benson and Earl Klugh – Collaboration; Larry Carlton – Discovery; David Sanborn – A Change of Heart; Yellowjackets – Four Corners	
1989	Yellowjackets	Politics	David Benoit – Every Step of the Way; Lyle Mays – Street Dreams; John Patitucci – John Patitucci; Tom Scott – "Amaretto" from Streamlines	
1990	Pat Metheny Group	Letter from Home	Larry Carlton – On Solid Ground; Terri Lyne Carrington – Real Life Story; Miles Davis – Amandla; John Patitucci – On the Corner; Joe Sample – Spellbound	
1991	Quincy Jones	"Birdland"	Chick Corea Elektric Band – Inside Out; Stan Getz – Apasionado; Lee Ritenour – Stolen Moments; Spyro Gyra – Fast Forward	

^{^[I]} Each year is linked to the article about the Grammy Awards held that year.

== See also ==
- List of Grammy Award categories
- List of jazz fusion musicians
- List of jazz fusion recordings
