= Are You Going with Me? =

1981 song by the Pat Metheny Group

"Are You Going with Me?" is a song by American contemporary jazz ensemble the Pat Metheny Group; it was composed by Metheny and keyboardist Lyle Mays. It was originally recorded in October 1981 for the band's third studio album Offramp.

== Background and production ==
The guitarist wrote in the Pat Metheny Songbook that the idea for "Are You Going with Me?" came to him while he was walking in the woods one summer day. He returned home and composed the piece on a Synclavier essentially as it had first come to him.

The song features a Latin inflection with a simple chord scheme played over a "gently percolating bass vamp". It also features two solos: the first by Mays, a "synthed-harmonica melody"; and a longer second solo by Metheny, played on a Roland GR-300. Metheny's sound on the Roland (which he also plays when the song is performed live) has been compared with wind instruments such as the flute, but most commonly with the trumpet.

A music video was produced by Robin Young in Los Angeles, prior to Young's move back to Boston to work for WHDH.

== Reception and influence ==
At the time of the song's recording, the influence of Brazilian music on the Pat Metheny Group was becoming more pronounced as Brazilian musician Nana Vasconcelos started to work with them. The "Brazilian" quality of "Are You Going with Me?" is frequently noted; and it has been considered by some to be "obviously samba-based".

The song was nominated for Best Instrumental Composition at the 1983 Grammy Awards; the Boston Globe added: "It's also our choice for the best fusion ballad of the year." Many critics continue to praise it: The Guinness Encyclopedia of Popular Music calls it "wonderfully contagious and arresting"; the Berliner Morgenpost, in 2010, called it a "heart-rending standard".

American jazz pianist Brad Mehldau, who first heard "Are You Going with Me?" when he was 13, described listening to it as "one of maybe five or six life-changing moments for me as a listening musician". The Los Angeles Lakers used it as background music for a slow-motion highlight film after winning an NBA championship.

The song is a regular part of Metheny’s performances. In 2002 Polish singer Anna Maria Jopek performed it with Metheny as part of her album Upojenie.

English drum and bass musician Goldie released a cover of the song (retitled "Tu viens avec moi?") on his 2017 album The Journey Man.
