= First Circle (album) =

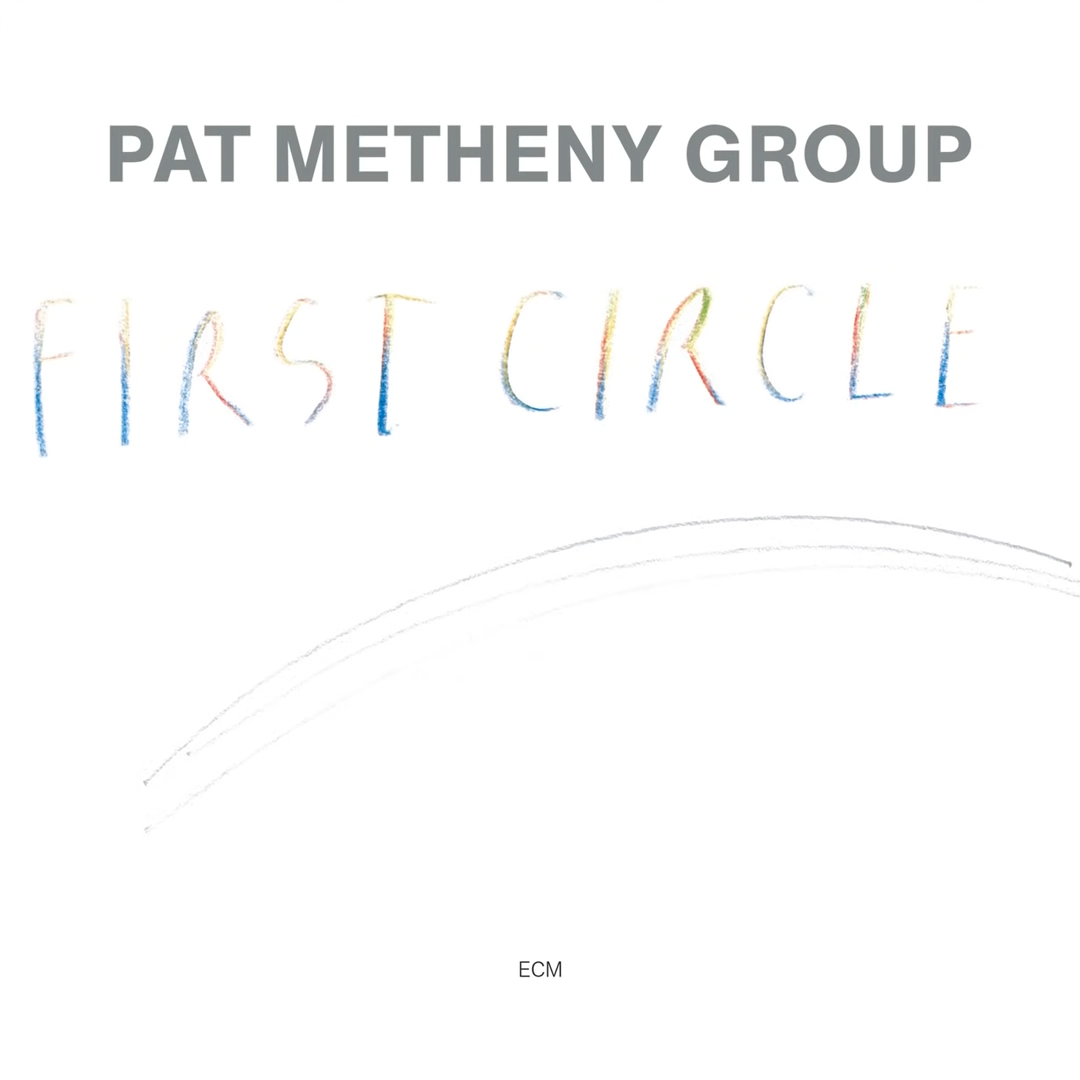

Studio album by the Pat Metheny Group
- Released: 1984
- Recorded: February 15–19, 1984
- Studios: Power Station, New York City
- Genre: Jazz fusion
- Length: 49:54
- Label: ECM
- Producer: Pat Metheny

Pat Metheny chronology
Rejoicing (1983)	First Circle (1984)	The Falcon and the Snowman (1985)

Professional ratings
Review scores
Source	Rating
AllMusic	4/5 stars
The Penguin Guide to Jazz Recordings	2.5/4 stars
The Rolling Stone Jazz Record Guide	2/5 stars

First Circle is the fourth studio album by the Pat Metheny Group. It was recorded over four days in February 1984 and released on ECM later that year. Metheny is joined by Lyle Mays on keyboards, Steve Rodby on bass, Paul Wertico on drums, and Pedro Aznar on vocals, percussion, and guitar. First Circle won the Grammy Award for Best Jazz Fusion Performance.

== History ==
Two personnel changes occurred. Drummer Danny Gottlieb was replaced by Paul Wertico, and the Group was joined by multi-instrumentalist Pedro Aznar, who had already established himself with the band Serú Girán in his native Argentina.

On First Circle, the Group used instruments it hadn't recorded with before, including the sitar ("Yolanda, You Learn"), trumpet ("Forward March"), and agogo bells ("Tell It All"). The first song, "Forward March", with Lyle Mays on trumpet, uses dissonant, out-of-tune chords and shifting time signatures. On putting the song first, Metheny remarked that it "seemed like a good idea at the time."

This was the first Group album to feature a song with written lyrics, "Más Allá," by Aznar.

First Circle expanded the scope of the Group's music. In a podcast retrospective, Metheny remarked that the album brought the Group to a creative high that he had been seeking since its foundation. "With the record, First Circle, I finally felt like the Group was what I hoped it might be someday...there was this feeling of, 'Okay, we've done it. We can go anywhere now.'" He stated that First Circle, Still Life (Talking), and Letter from Home, among the Group's most popular albums, were part of a trilogy connected by their musical explorations and accessibly melodic personalities.

Along with "Phase Dance" and "Are You Going With Me?", the album's title track, "The First Circle", became one of the Group's most popular songs.

== Track listing ==
All tracks are written by Pat Metheny and Lyle Mays except where noted.

Side one
No.	Title	Writer(s)	Length
1.	"Forward March"	Metheny	2:47
2.	"Yolanda, You Learn"	Mays	4:43
3.	"The First Circle"		9:10
4.	"If I Could"	Metheny	6:54

Side two
No.	Title	Writer(s)	Length
1.	"Tell It All"		7:55
2.	"End of the Game"		7:57
3.	"Más Allá (Beyond)"	Metheny, Pedro Aznar	5:37
4.	"Praise"		4:19

== Personnel ==
- Pat Metheny – electric guitar, acoustic six-and twelve-string guitars, slide guitar, Synclavier guitar, Danelectro sitar guitar
- Lyle Mays – piano, synthesizers, Oberheim, organ, agogô bells, trumpet
- Steve Rodby – acoustic and electric bass, kick drum
- Paul Wertico – drums, field drum, cymbals
- Pedro Aznar – vocals, percussion, glockenspiel, acoustic, electric and twelve-string guitars, whistle

== Charts ==
Year	Chart	Position
1984	Billboard Jazz Albums	2
1984	Billboard Top 100	102

== Awards ==
Grammy Awards

Year	Category
1985	Grammy Award for Best Jazz Fusion Performance
