= Lyle Mays (album) =

Studio album by Lyle Mays
- Released: 1986
- Recorded: 1985
- Studio: Power Station, New York City
- Genre: Jazz; jazz fusion
- Length: 48:20
- Label: Geffen; GED24097
- Producer: Lyle Mays; Steven Cantor

Lyle Mays chronology
Lyle Mays (1986)	Street Dreams (1988)

Lyle Mays is the debut album by Pat Metheny Group keyboardist Lyle Mays, recorded at The Power Station in New York in 1985, and released by Geffen Records in 1986. The album has been reissued multiple times, including to digital formats in 2010.

== Reception ==
Professional ratings
Review scores
Source	Rating
AllMusic	4.5/5 stars

The AllMusic review by Richard S. Ginell awards the album 4.5 stars and states:

Lyle Mays waited a long, long time before straying from the Pat Metheny Group to issue his first solo album, but when he did, the results were at once removed but not totally untethered to the Metheny sound and feeling. On his own, Mays' synthesizer solos and textures are close in sound to what he was doing in the Metheny group, but the turns of phrases in his acoustic piano solos reflect the heavy shadow of Keith Jarrett... Although the 14-minute "Alaskan Suite" forms the centerpiece of the LP's side two, the entire side could be considered a suite as a whole, with a ruminative piano solo "Mirror of the Heart" preceding "Alaskan Suite," and "Close to Home" reprising the twinkling, burbling shafts of synthesizer of "Alaskan Suite"'s opening.

== Track listing ==
All music is composed by Lyle Mays.

Side I
No.	Title	Length
1.	"Highland Aire"	7:04
2.	"Teiko"	7:24
3.	"Slink"	8:18

Side II
No.	Title	Length
1.	"Mirror of the Heart"	5:04
2.	"Alaskan Suite: Northern Lights"	3:17
3.	"Alaskan Suite: Invocation"	3:57
4.	"Alaskan Suite: Ascent"	6:58
5.	"Close to Home"	6:13

== Personnel ==
- Lyle Mays – piano, synthesizer, autoharp
- Alejandro N. Acuña – drums
- Billy Drewes – alto & soprano saxophones
- Bill Frisell – guitar
- Marc Johnson – acoustic bass
- Nana Vasconcelos – percussion
- Ted Jensen at Sterling Sound, NYC – mastering

== Charts ==
Chart	Peak position
US Billboard Jazz Albums	12
