= Peperina (album) =

1981 studio album by Serú Girán

Studio album by Serú Girán
- Released: 31 August 1981
- Recorded: 1981
- Studio: ION Studios (Buenos Aires); Wacameca Studios (Buenos Aires)
- Genre: Art rock; progressive rock; jazz fusion
- Length: 40:02
- Label: SG Discos
- Producer: Serú Girán

Serú Girán chronology
Bicicleta (1980)	Peperina (1981)	Serú '92 (1992)

Peperina is the fourth studio album released by the Argentinian rock group Serú Girán, released in 1981. It was Serú Girán's last album until the 1992 reunion. The group released four successful singles from the album: "Peperina", "Cinema Verité", "Esperando nacer" and "Salir de la melancolía".

== Overview ==
Peperina was recorded in early 1981, mainly at the ION Studios and then, some tracks at Wacameca Studios. The title-song is about a journalist writing from Expreso Imaginario magazine, called Patricia Perea, who rated the Serú Girán shows in Cordoba as embarrassing. Charly García wrote the song as a response to her attack on the band. Reportedly, upon first listening to the song, Perea remarked that she still did not like Serú Girán, but that García was "a good sociologist". The record has featured in numerous publications' lists of the best Argentine Rock discs. Many consider Peperina to be the band's finest album, due to the sound quality.

By 1981, the band had achieved considerable commercial success in Argentina, including several hits, so it made sense to present the album at the Estadio Obras, on 4, 5 and 6 September of that same year. Also, Serú Girán performed at the Teatro Coliseo during the Christmas' week between 25, 26 and 27 December, with the three shows sold out.

== Track listing ==
- All songs written by Charly García, except as noted.

=== Side one ===
1. "Peperina" - (3:42)
2. "Llorando en el espejo" (Crying in the mirror) - (4:03)
3. "Parado en medio de la vida" (Standing in the middle of life) (David Lebón) - (2:22)
4. "Cara de velocidad" (Speed face) (Lebón) - (2:40)
5. "Esperando nacer" (Waiting to be born) (García/Lebón) - (5:44)
6. "20 trajes verdes" (20 green suits) - (2:05)

=== Side two ===
1. "Cinema Verité" - (4:55)
2. "En la vereda del sol" (On the sidewalk of the sun) (García/Lebón) - (5:22)
3. "José Mercado" - (3:32)
4. "Salir de la melancolía" (Getting out of melancholy) - (2:07)
5. "Lo que dice la lluvia" (What the rain says) (Pedro Aznar) - (5:07)

== Personnel ==
Serú Girán

- Charly García – keyboards, organ, piano Yamaha CP-70, acoustic piano, Wurlitzer electric piano, Clavinet piano, Minimoog, Moog Satellite and vocals.
- David Lebón – electric and acoustic guitars, tumbadoras, timbales, percussion and vocals.
- Pedro Aznar – bass, fretless bass, double bass, Moog bass, Oberheim OBX synthesizer, Brass OBX, piano, acoustic guitar and backing vocals.
- Oscar Moro – drums, percussion.

Additional personnel

- Produced by Serú Girán.
- Engineer – Amílcar Gilabert.
- Cover Design – The Image Bank.
- Photography – Andy Cherniavsky.
