= Rejoicing (album) =

Studio album by Pat Metheny
- Released: 1984
- Recorded: November 29–30, 1983
- Studios: Power Station, New York City
- Genre: Jazz
- Length: 43:53
- Label: ECM
- Producer: Manfred Eicher

Pat Metheny chronology
Travels (1983)	Rejoicing (1984)	First Circle (1984)

Rejoicing is an album by American jazz guitarist Pat Metheny recorded over two days in November 1983 and released on ECM the following year. The trio features rhythm section Charlie Haden and Billy Higgins, both of whom played with Ornette Coleman in the late 1950s and early 1960s.

== Background ==
In addition to his own compositions, Metheny plays three compositions by Coleman, and Horace Silver's "Lonely Woman" (not to be confused with the Coleman composition of the same title, which Metheny does not play on the album).

== Reception ==
Professional ratings
Review scores
Source	Rating
AllMusic	4.5/5 stars
The Penguin Guide to Jazz Recordings	3.5/4 stars
The Rolling Stone Jazz Record Guide	4/5 stars
DownBeat	4.5/5 stars
Tom Hull	B

Scott Yanow of AllMusic wrote: "Throughout this excellent set, Metheny and his sidemen engage in close communication and create memorable and unpredictable music."

== Track listing ==
Side one
No.	Title	Writer(s)	Length
1.	"Lonely Woman"	Horace Silver	6:50
2.	"Tears Inside"	Ornette Coleman	3:50
3.	"Humpty Dumpty"	Ornette Coleman	5:42
4.	"Blues for Pat"	Charlie Haden	6:06
5.	"Rejoicing"	Ornette Coleman	3:24

Side two
No.	Title	Writer(s)	Length
1.	"Story from a Stranger"	Pat Metheny	5:53
2.	"The Calling"	Pat Metheny	9:52
3.	"Waiting for an Answer"	Pat Metheny, Charlie Haden	2:16

== Personnel ==
- Pat Metheny – acoustic and electric guitars, guitar synthesizer
- Charlie Haden – double bass
- Billy Higgins – drums

=== Technical staff ===
- Manfred Eicher – producer
- Jan Erik Kongshaug – recording engineer
- Rob Van Petten – photography
- Barbara Wojirsch – Design

== Charts ==
Chart (1984)	Peak position
Canada Top Albums/CDs (RPM)	94
US Billboard 200	116
