= Offramp (album) =

Studio album by the Pat Metheny Group
- Released: May 1982
- Recorded: October 1981
- Studio: Power Station, New York City
- Genre: Jazz fusion
- Length: 42:22
- Label: ECM
- Producer: Manfred Eicher

Pat Metheny chronology
As Falls Wichita, So Falls Wichita Falls (1981)	Offramp (1982)	Travels (1983)

Offramp is the third studio album by the Pat Metheny Group, recorded in October 1981 and released on ECM in May of the following year. The performers are Pat Metheny, Lyle Mays, Steve Rodby and Danny Gottlieb along with percussionist and vocalist Naná Vasconcelos.

== Background ==
Offramp is the first studio album on which Metheny used a guitar synthesizer—the Roland GR-300—which would become one of his signature instruments.

Offramp is also the first Pat Metheny Group album to include vocals, which became a fundamental component of the band's sound. When Metheny and Lyle Mays partnered with Brazilian percussionist Naná Vasconcelos on the album As Falls Wichita, So Falls Wichita Falls, they sought to expand the potential of the recording studio as an ensemble instrument and experiment with sounds they hadn't previously utilized. Some of the innovations introduced on Wichita carried over into Offramp, namely Vasconcelos's vocals and percussion.

Bassist Mark Egan was replaced by Steve Rodby, who remained with the Group well into the 2000s and became an important partner in the compositional and production processes between Metheny and Mays.

The Group pays tribute to one of Metheny's biggest influences, pioneering free jazz instrumentalist Ornette Coleman, on the title track, and singer-songwriter James Taylor served as the inspiration for the sixth track, "James."

== Reception ==
Professional ratings
Review scores
Source	Rating
AllMusic	4.5/5 stars
The Encyclopedia of Popular Music	5/5 stars
The Penguin Guide to Jazz Recordings	2.5/4 stars
The Rolling Stone Jazz Record Guide	3/5 stars

Offramp was critically acclaimed and commercially successful at the time of its release. Billboard wrote that Metheny had "forged his own distinct ensemble style" with Offramp with "his supple guitar style with an increasingly suave use of synthesizers and sonic effects".

It won the Playboy Readers Poll for Best Jazz Album and the 1983 Grammy Award for Best Jazz Fusion Performance, the Group's first of ten Grammys.

It was voted number 669 in the third edition of Colin Larkin's All Time Top 1000 Albums (2000).

== Track listing ==
All tracks are written by Pat Metheny and Lyle Mays, except as noted.

Side I
No.	Title	Writer(s)	Length
1.	"Barcarole"	Metheny; Mays; Naná Vasconcelos	3:17
2.	"Are You Going with Me?"		8:47
3.	"Au lait"		8:32

Side II
No.	Title	Writer(s)	Length
1.	"Eighteen"	Metheny; Mays; Vasconcelos	5:08
2.	"Offramp"		5:59
3.	"James"		6:47
4.	"The Bat Part II"		3:50
Total length:			42:20

=== Note ===
- "The Bat Part II" is a reworking of "The Bat", from Metheny's 80/81 (1980)

== Personnel ==
Pat Metheny Group

- Pat Metheny – electric and acoustic guitar, guitar synthesizer, Synclavier
- Lyle Mays – piano, synthesizers, autoharp, electric organ, Synclavier
- Steve Rodby – electric and acoustic bass
- Danny Gottlieb – drums
- Naná Vasconcelos – percussion, voice, berimbau

Technical staff

- Manfred Eicher – producer
- Jan Erik Kongshaug, Gragg Lunsford – recording engineer
- Barry Bongiovi – assistant engineer
- Dieter Rehm – design
- Gerd Winner – cover graphics
- Deborah Feingold – photography

== Charts ==
Chart (1982)	Peak position
US Billboard 200	50
US Billboard Jazz LPs	1
US Top R&B/Hip-Hop Albums (Billboard)	43

== Awards ==
Grammy Awards

Year	Category
1983	Grammy Award for Best Jazz Fusion Performance
