= As Falls Wichita, So Falls Wichita Falls =

Studio album by Pat Metheny & Lyle Mays
- Released: April 27, 1981
- Recorded: September 1980
- Studio: Talent, Oslo, Norway
- Genre: Jazz fusion
- Length: 43:34
- Label: ECM
- Producer: Manfred Eicher

Pat Metheny chronology
80/81 (1980)	As Falls Wichita, So Falls Wichita Falls (1981)	Offramp (1982)

Professional ratings
Review scores
Source	Rating
AllMusic	4/5 stars
DownBeat	5/5 stars
The Encyclopedia of Popular Music	4/5 stars
The Penguin Guide to Jazz Recordings	2.5/4 stars
Rolling Stone	4/5 stars
The Rolling Stone Jazz Record Guide	2/5 stars

As Falls Wichita, So Falls Wichita Falls is an album by jazz guitarist Pat Metheny and jazz pianist Lyle Mays, recorded in September 1980 and released on ECM in April 1981. The trio features percussionist Naná Vasconcelos.

== Background ==
The title of the album was suggested by a friend of Metheny, who thought that it was the only title that fit the "vagueness of the music". As Falls Wichita, So Falls Wichita Falls comprises a 20 minute title track and four additional shorter compositions. Over the span of five years, Metheny and Mays had pieced together remnants of compositions that they deemed unsuitable for the Pat Metheny Group. After three years, they had settled on enough material to warrant the creation of an album. Metheny commented that As Falls Wichita, So Falls Wichita Falls marked the first time that synthesizers were used extensively on one of his albums.

It's only been in the last three or four years that synthesizers have gotten to the point where they really sound good. As that's been happening, Lyle and I have been trying to incorporate them with acoustic instruments in such a way that you can't tell which is which.

— Pat Metheny

Throughout the album, Metheny acts as the lead guitarist, accompanying guitarist, and bassist using the overdubbing technique. The track "September Fifteenth" is in reference to September 15, 1980, the day the American jazz pianist Bill Evans died. Metheny and Mays cite Evans as a main influence. "September Fifteenth" and "It's for You," as well as "Farmers' Trust" from Metheny's 1983 live album Travels, appear in the score for the 1985 film Fandango. "It's for You" was later covered by Akiko Yano, with Metheny on guitar, for her 1989 album, Welcome Back.

A section of the title track (starting at 14:56) has been used by Christian Dior for the Fahrenheit perfume and cologne ads since 1988.

== Track listing ==
All music is composed by Pat Metheny and Lyle Mays.

Side one:
No.	Title	Length
1.	"As Falls Wichita, So Falls Wichita Falls"	20:44

Side two:
No.	Title	Length
1.	"Ozark"	4:03
2.	"September Fifteenth" (dedicated to Bill Evans)	7:45
3.	"'It's for You'"	8:20
4.	"Estupenda Graça"	2:40

== Personnel ==
- Pat Metheny – electric and acoustic 6- and 12-string guitars, bass guitar
- Lyle Mays – piano, Prophet 5 & Oberheim FVS synthesizers, electric organ, autoharp
- Naná Vasconcelos – berimbau, percussion, drums, vocals

Technical staff

- Manfred Eicher – producer
- Jan Erik Kongshaug – recording engineer
- Bob Ludwig – mastering
- Klaus Frahm – cover photography
- Rob Van Patten – photography
- Barbara Wojirsch – design

== Charts ==
Year	Chart	Position
1981	Billboard Jazz Albums	1
1981	Billboard Pop Albums	50
