= This Is Not America =

Song by David Bowie

Single by David Bowie and the Pat Metheny Group

from the album The Falcon and the Snowman: Original Motion Picture Soundtrack
- B-side: "This Is Not America" (instrumental)
- Released: 28 January 1985
- Genre: Jazz
- Length: 3:51
- Label: EMI America
- Songwriters: David Bowie; Pat Metheny; Lyle Mays
- Producers: David Bowie; Pat Metheny

David Bowie singles chronology
"Tonight" (1984)	"This Is Not America" (1985)	"Loving the Alien" (1985)

"This Is Not America" is a song by the English singer David Bowie and American jazz fusion band the Pat Metheny Group, taken from the soundtrack to the 1985 film The Falcon and the Snowman. It was released as a single in February 1985, reaching number 14 in the United Kingdom and number 32 in the United States.

== Background and recording ==
Having finished his 1984 album Tonight and being dissatisfied with it, Bowie began a series of soundtrack projects (Labyrinth, Absolute Beginners and When the Wind Blows, all in 1986) that started with this collaboration with the Pat Metheny Group. Recorded in late 1984, "This Is Not America" was released as a single in early 1985 and on the soundtrack to the movie.

Metheny had written an instrumental piece for the movie called "Chris" and wanted to turn it into a full-length song; "This Is Not America" was the result of their collaboration. Bowie watched an early screening of The Falcon and the Snowman and took notes on lines and themes that they might use; "This is not America" is a line said by one character to another, and both Bowie and Metheny agreed it was interesting.

Despite Metheny being known as a jazz musician, the song was described by Bowie biographer Chris O'Leary as "hardly a jazz piece", as Metheny plays a simple rhythm guitar throughout the song, with no solos or improvisations. Metheny later noted that Bowie's lyrics were "profound and meaningful—and absolutely perfect for the film."

Bowie does not appear in the corresponding music video for the single as it was made up entirely of clips from the movie.

== Critical reception ==
Cashbox called "This Is Not America" a "brooding pop tune", saying that the song's "light Calypso beat punctuates Metheny's moody synthesizer (Note: The liner notes for The Falcon and the Snowman: Original Motion Picture Soundtrack credit Lyle Mays with keyboards rather than Metheny) backing, as Bowie's ever dramatic ballad style surges with characteristic verve." They concluded that the song was "a radio attention-getter" with "melodic hooks for CHR". Billboard magazine characterised the song as "an enigmatic mood piece with the singer in his West-End-musical mode." Reviewing the single for Music Week, Jerry Smith described it as a "dramatic track" that possessed "yet another fine vocal performance from Bowie with a moody cinematic style backing". He felt that the song was "not immediately memorable" after the first listen but was "unforgettable" after a few plays.

== Other appearances ==
The song appeared on The Singles Collection (1993). The 1995 reissue of Bowie's 1984 album Tonight includes "This Is Not America" as a bonus track. "This Is Not America" appears as a B-side to Bowie's 1997 single "I Can't Read". It was also released on Best of Bowie (2002), appearing on all but the Australian and Japanese pressings of that album, The Platinum Collection (2005), The Best of David Bowie 1980/1987 (2007), Nothing Has Changed (2014; two-disc and three-disc editions), Bowie Legacy (2016; two-disc edition), and Loving the Alien (1983–1988) (2018; box set).

A remix by the Scumfrog was released on Club Bowie (2003), and the song was also performed in Bowie's musical Lazarus (2016). A cast recording from the musical, which also included a performance of the song, was released in October 2016.

== Live versions ==
The Pat Metheny Group recorded the song live for the 1995 DVD We Live Here, with band members replacing Bowie on vocals. Bowie recorded a performance of the song at the BBC Radio Theatre in London on 27 June 2000, and it was released on the bonus disc accompanying the first release of Bowie at the Beeb; a remastered and complete version of that show was re-released in 2021 as part of the Bowie box set Brilliant Adventure (1992-2001). Another version featuring Anna Maria Jopek and Pat Metheny was recorded live in Warsaw in 2002 and is included on the album Anna Maria Jopek and Pat Metheny Live in Warsaw 2002.

== "American Dream" ==
Bowie performs a variation of "This Is Not America" on the P. Diddy song "American Dream" for the soundtrack to the 2001 film Training Day. Bowie said, "This version's definitely got a menace. ... There's a fast techno flavour to it. It's got an aggression to it that really reflects the movie."

== Track listing ==
- 7-inch and 12-inch single

A. "This Is Not America" – 3:51
B. "This Is Not America" (instrumental) – 3:51

== Personnel ==
Personnel are adapted from the liner notes of The Falcon and the Snowman: Original Motion Picture Soundtrack.

- David Bowie – vocals, songwriting
- Pat Metheny – guitars, production, songwriting
- Lyle Mays – keyboards, production, songwriting
- Steve Rodby – bass
- Paul Wertico – drums, percussion
- Bob Clearmountain – mixing
- Bob Ludwig – mastering engineering

== Charts ==
=== Weekly charts ===
1985 weekly chart performance for "This Is Not America"
Chart (1985)	Peak position
Australia (Kent Music Report)	33
Austria (Ö3 Austria Top 40)	5
Belgium (Ultratop 50 Flanders)	2
Canada Top Singles (RPM)	23
Europe (European Top 100 Singles)	13
Finland (Suomen virallinen lista)	16
Greece (IFPI)	3
Ireland (IRMA)	9
Israel (Israeli Singles Chart)	1
Italy (Musica e dischi)	3
Netherlands (Dutch Top 40)	1
Netherlands (Single Top 100)	2
New Zealand (Recorded Music NZ)	12
Norway (VG-lista)	3
Sweden (Sverigetopplistan)	2
Switzerland (Schweizer Hitparade)	6
UK Singles (Official Charts)	14
US Billboard Hot 100	32
US 12-inch Singles Sales (Billboard)	42
US Top Rock Tracks (Billboard)	7
West Germany (GfK)	5

2016 weekly chart performance for "This Is Not America"
Chart (2016)	Peak position
France (SNEP)	92

=== Year-end charts ===
Year-end chart performance for "This Is Not America"
Chart (1985)	Position
Austria (Ö3 Austria Top 40)	26
Belgium (Ultratop 50 Flanders)	28
Netherlands (Dutch Top 40)	21
Netherlands (Single Top 100)	23
West Germany (Media Control)	24
