= Quartet (Pat Metheny album) =

Studio album by Pat Metheny Group
- Released: November 1996
- Recorded: May 1996
- Studios: Right Track, New York City
- Genres: Jazz, jazz fusion
- Length: 66:01
- Label: Geffen
- Producer: Pat Metheny

Pat Metheny chronology
We Live Here (1995)	Quartet (1996)	Beyond the Missouri Sky (Short Stories) (1997)

Professional ratings
Review scores
Source	Rating
AllMusic	3/5 stars
The Penguin Guide to Jazz Recordings	3/4 stars

Quartet (1996) is the eighth studio album by the Pat Metheny Group. The album features Pat Metheny on guitar, Lyle Mays on keyboards, Steve Rodby on bass, and Paul Wertico on drums. The approach for the album was to not write lengthy compositions before recording but instead use merely sketches and rely mostly on improvisation in a setting with just acoustic instruments, a departure from the usual thoroughly orchestrated sound using synthesizers and sequencing the Group is usually known for. The result is experimental, moody, and loose, even dark in some moments. The instrumentation relies mostly on acoustic instruments including various keyboard instruments such as the spinet piano, Harmonium, Fender Rhodes, autoharp and various guitars including the 42-string Pikasso guitar. The Roland GR-300 guitar synthesizer makes appearances on "Oceania" and "Language of Time".

With the exception of "When We Were Free" on the Group's final Songbook Tour, the Group itself never played these songs live. "When We Were Free" however has been played in various other trios and groups centered around Metheny including a version recorded on Day Trip. Michael Brecker recorded versions of "As I Am" (on Time Is of the Essence), "Seven Days" and "Sometimes I See" (on Nearness of You: The Ballad Book).

== Track listing ==
All tracks are written by Pat Metheny except where noted.

No.	Title	Writer(s)	Length
1.	"Introduction"		0:56
2.	"When We Were Free"		5:39
3.	"Montevideo"	Metheny, Mays, Rodby, Wertico	2:55
4.	"Take Me There"	Metheny, Mays	3:39
5.	"Seven Days"		4:04
6.	"Oceania"	Mays	3:47
7.	"Dismantling Utopia"	Metheny, Mays, Rodby, Wertico	6:52
8.	"Double Blind"	Mays	4:15
9.	"Second Thought"		2:50
10.	"Mojave"		3:37
11.	"Badland"	Metheny, Mays, Rodby, Wertico	7:31
12.	"Glacier"	Mays	1:25
13.	"Language of Time"	Metheny, Mays	7:33
14.	"Sometimes I See"		6:01
15.	"As I Am"		5:04

== Personnel ==
- Pat Metheny – acoustic and electric guitars, guitar synthesizer, 12-string guitar, slide guitar, 42-string Pikasso guitar
- Lyle Mays – autoharp, celeste, clavichord, harmonium, piano, electric piano
- Steve Rodby – double bass, piccolo bass
- Paul Wertico – drums, percussion
