= Alas (Argentine band) =

Agentine progressive rock band

Alas was a mid-1970s, mostly instrumental progressive rock group in Argentine rock. They were also one of the major players in the tango-rock movement in Argentina during that period, alongside Rodolfo Mederos's group Generación Cero.

== History ==
Gustavo Moretto had left Alma y Vida to pursue other musical projects. He was eventually joined by drummer Carlos Riganti (formerly of Materia Gris), and by Alex Zuker, which became the original line up for Alas. They made their live debut at the IFT Theater in 1975.

By the end of the year they released a single: "Rincón, mi viejo rincón", which the track "Aire (surgente)" on the back side.

Their self-titled first studio album came out in 1976. It featured two extended compositions, in turn subdivided into smaller passages. The album contains the songs "Buenos Aires sólo es piedra" and "La muerte contó el dinero". For this album, the band was joined by bandoneón player Daniel Binelli.

Following this album, Alex Zuker left Alas and Pedro Aznar joined the group. Aznar worked on the group's second album, Pinta Tu Aldea, which was on track to be released in 1977.

Yet the album opener "A Quiénes Sino" is generally seen as the best Alas track ever; the rest of the first half is an exquisite blend of tango-rock with jazz incursions. In the second half, the band does not sound as tight or in control of the music.

Alas broke up in 1978. In 2003, the original trio was reunited, along with Martín Moretto on guitar and Héctor del Curto on bandoneón for a few shows in the United States. They were joined by Aznar and Binelli for their 2005 album, Mimame Bandoneón, which featured an even greater tango influence.

== Members ==
- Gustavo Moretto: keyboards, wind instruments and voice (1974–1978, 2003–2005)
- Alex Zuker: guitar and bass (1974–1977, 2003–2005)
- Carlos Riganti: drums and percussion (1974–1977, 2003–2005)
- Pedro Aznar: bass (1977–1978)

Guests

- Daniel Binelli: bandoneon (1977, 2005)
- Néstor Marconi: bandoneon (1977)
- Cecilia Tanconi: flute (1977)
- Héctor Del Curto: bandoneón (2003–2005)
- Martín Moretto: guitarra (2003–2005)

== Discography ==
- Aire (surgente) / Rincón, mi viejo rincón (1975)
- Alas (1976)
- Pinta tu aldea (1977, released in 1983)
- Mimame bandoneón (2005)
