= La Grasa de las Capitales =

Studio album by Serú Girán
- Released: 19 August 1979
- Recorded: June–August 1979
- Venue: ION Studios, Buenos Aires
- Genre: Progressive rock, jazz-fusion, progressive pop
- Length: 43:43
- Label: Sazam
- Producer: Charly García

Serú Girán chronology
Serú Girán (1978)	La Grasa de las Capitales (1979)	Bicicleta (1980)

La Grasa de las Capitales is the second album by the Argentine progressive rock supergroup Serú Girán, released in 1979. After its deeply criticized debut album Serú Girán, the band distanced themselves from symphonic rock and moved closer to traditional rock and pop while keeping a considerable jazz fusion element in the music, which also was present in the debut album.

The word "grasa" means "grease" in Spanish, but in Argentina it is also slang for "tacky". As such, the title of the album was a criticism of the superficiality of Argentine society at the time (which was living under a military dictatorship following the 1976 coup) among other aspects what it was considered then "commercial" music (as opposed to the more elaborate lyrics and musicianship supposedly present in genres such as prog rock) with disco music being parodied in the opening title track. The cover of the album is a spoof of popular gossip magazine Gente, with members of the band presented as improbable celebrities (Aznar an obscure office worker, Moro a butcher, Lebon a rugby player and Garcia a petrol station worker – a criticism to petrol companies who "stuff themselves with money and run the world" according to Garcia) one of the headlines announcing a romance between Aznar and "Olivia Neutron-Bomb" (cf Olivia-Newton John, the star of that year's blockbuster musical "Grease").

The album spawned three hit singles. Pedro Aznar's "Paranoia y Soledad" (Paranoia and Loneliness) which was a cryptically metaphoric song talking about a man's descent into insanity; "La Grasa de Las Capitales" (The Grease/Tackiness of the Capitals) which presented a sharp criticism on the paparazzi and the frivolous magazines (as showed on the album cover) and briefly parodied disco music, and the final track, "Viernes, 3 A.M." (Friday, 3 A.M.) which had lyrics graphically depicting a man's suicide, which was banned from radio play by the dictatorship due to it "encouraging suicide". Luis Alberto Spinetta later referred to the track as "something even Lennon and McCartney would've wanted to write".

In 2007, the Argentine edition of Rolling Stone ranked it 17 on its list of "The 100 Greatest Albums of National Rock". In 2019, the album was remastered and reissued for its 40th anniversary.

== Background and recording ==
After Serú Girán's first album (1978), the band solidified its sound and recorded a new album. La Grasa De Las Capitales (The Grease of the Capitals) garnered equally unconditional admirers and detractors. On one hand, there were those who welcomed a García who had abandoned complexity and returned to the social criticism he had previously developed so effectively. On the other, there were those who condemned this simplicity as a lack of progression. The songs offer an social commentary on the superficiality and consumerism of urban culture and the psychological toll of living under the dictatorship, among other aspects of Argentine life during the time of its release, while exploring such irritating existential themes as death, abandonment, paranoia, societal alienation, and heartbreak, and which stood at the opposite end of the musical spectrum from the group's previous work. Their songs—compared to those mentioned above—might be considered lightweight or frivolous. In addition to the lyrics, it's worth highlighting the remarkable synchronization with which the four members worked musically, each contributing their own unique style.

The truth is that Serú Girán produced one of the most accomplished works of that year. The title track is the most politically engaged song on the entire album and presented a sharp criticism on the paparazzi and the frivolous magazines while also offering an open and unflinching critique of the most deplorable and decadent aspects of large cities and their polluting elements. "San Francisco Y El Lobo" (Saint Francis and the Wolf) is an acoustic ballad sung by a finely tuned Lebón and uses the traditional Catholic story of the Wolf of Gubbio as a basis for commentary on human hypocrisy and social conflict. "Perro Andaluz" (Andalusian Dog/Un chien andalou) is a song by García that presents a simple love story in which disillusionment gives way to a latent threat. "Frecuencia Modulada" ((Frequency Modulation/FM) is an attack against the emptiness and mocks the commercial, superficial pop music that was gaining popularity on FM radio stations at the time of its release in the late 1970s. It is followed by "Paranoia Y Soledad" (Paranoia and Loneliness), a song by Pedro Aznar in which he plays all the instruments and displays a wide vocal range. The lyrics are described as cryptically metaphoric, illustrating a individual's personal psychological struggle before descend into insanity.

The second side features the album's strongest and most polished songs. "Noche De Perros" (Dog Night) is a beautiful melody built upon the unmistakable sound of an inspired Aznar's fretless bass, with a crescendo that explodes into David Lebón's vigorous guitar and describe profound loneliness, despair, and disorientation, using metaphors like "night of dogs" to depict inner turmoil and the struggle to find solace in an urban setting. "Viernes, 3 A.M." (Friday 3.A.M.) is a song that immediately captivates the listener with its melody. It's one of García's most accomplished compositions in recent times. The lyrics graphically depict an man's suicide and speak of anguish, alienation, and depression and has a nostalgic Buenos Aires feel, underscored by the backing vocals and piano. The album closes with "Los Sobrevivientes" (The Survivors), a kind of self-portrait of young people's lives during the winter of the dictatorship, and Cancion de Hollywood" (Hollywood Song), a sharp depiction of the decline of a "star in ruins" that recalls the cinematic atmosphere of some songs on La Máquina De Hacer Pájaros' album Películas.

== Track listing ==
Side one
No.	Title	Writer(s)	Length
1.	"La Grasa de las Capitales (The Tacky Capitals)"	Charly García	4:37
2.	"San Francisco y el Lobo (Saint Francis and the Wolf)"	David Lebón, Charly García	2:23
3.	"Perro Andaluz (Andalusian Dog/Un chien andalou)"	García	4:59
4.	"Frecuencia Modulada (Frequency Modulation/FM)"	García, Lebón	3:20
5.	"Paranoia y Soledad (Paranoia and Loneliness)"	Pedro Aznar	6:52

Side two
No.	Title	Writer(s)	Length
1.	"Noche de Perros (Dog Night)"	Lebón, García	6:34
2.	"Viernes, 3 A.M. (Friday, 3 A.M.)"	García	4:18
3.	"Los Sobrevivientes (The Survivors)"	García	3:51
4.	"Canción de Hollywood (Hollywood Song)"	García	4:54

== Personnel ==
Serú Girán

- Charly García – Fender Rhodes electric piano, Yamaha CP-70, Minimoog, mellotron, lead vocals, Moog bass in "Los Sobrevivientes"
- David Lebón - electric guitar, acoustic guitar, lead vocals in "San Francisco y el lobo", "Frecuencia modulada" and "Noche de perros"
- Pedro Aznar - bass guitar, fretless bass, Minimoog, acoustic guitar, lead vocal, tubular bells on "Paranoia y Soledad"
- Oscar Moro - drums, percussion

Production staff

- Produced by Charly García.
- Executive produced by Oscar López.
- Recorded by Amílcar Gilabert
- All arrangements by Serú Girán.
- Artwork by Rodolfo Bozzolo.
- Front cover photographed by Rubén Andón.

== Charts ==
2020 reissue
Chart	Position
Argentina (CAPIF)	1
