= Nearness of You: The Ballad Book =

Studio album by Michael Brecker
- Released: June 19, 2001
- Recorded: December 18–20, 2000
- Studio: Right Track Recording (New York, NY)
- Genre: Jazz
- Length: 60:23
- Label: Verve
- Producer: Pat Metheny: Steve Rodby

Michael Brecker chronology
Time Is of the Essence (1999)	Nearness of You: The Ballad Book (2001)	Directions in Music: Live at Massey Hall (2002)

Professional ratings
Review scores
Source	Rating
AllMusic	4.5/5 stars
The Penguin Guide to Jazz Recordings	3/4 stars

Nearness of You: The Ballad Book is the seventh studio album by saxophone player Michael Brecker. Accompanied by Herbie Hancock on piano, Pat Metheny on guitars, Charlie Haden on bass, Jack DeJohnette on drums, and a special guest appearance by James Taylor, the album was released by Verve Records on June 19, 2001.

Brecker was awarded his eighth Grammy for Best Jazz Instrumental Solo on "Chan's Song". Taylor also won his fourth Best Male Pop Vocal Performance Grammy for "Don't Let Me Be Lonely Tonight". With his win, he became the first American recording artist to garner a win in that category since Michael Bolton in 1992.

== Track listing ==
No.	Title	Writer(s)	Length
1.	"Chan's Song"	Herbie Hancock	5:15
2.	"Don't Let Me Be Lonely Tonight"	James Taylor	4:43
3.	"Nascente"	Murilo Antunes, Flavio Venturini	6:18
4.	"Midnight Mood"	Joe Zawinul	6:22
5.	"The Nearness of You"	Hoagy Carmichael, Ned Washington	4:37
6.	"Incandescence"	Michael Brecker	5:21
7.	"Sometimes I See"	Pat Metheny	5:26
8.	"My Ship"	Kurt Weill, Ira Gershwin	7:10
9.	"Always"	Irving Berlin	5:37
10.	"Seven Days"	Metheny	5:32
11.	"I Can See Your Dreams"	Brecker	3:50

== Personnel ==
=== Musicians ===
- Michael Brecker – tenor saxophone
- Herbie Hancock – grand piano
- Pat Metheny – guitars
- Charlie Haden – bass
- Jack DeJohnette – drums
- Dave Samuels – additional percussion
- James Taylor – vocals (tracks 2, 5)

=== Technical personnel ===
- Pat Metheny – producer
- Steve Rodby – co-producer, digital assembly
- Richard Seidel – executive producer
- James Farber – recording and mixing
- Andrew Fellus – assistant engineer
- Paul Gregory – assistant engineer
- Timmy Olmstead – assistant engineer
- Jason Stasium – assistant engineer
- Pete Karam – technical assistance
- Carolyn Chrzan – technical coordinator
- David Oakes – technical coordinator
- Tom Sheehan – piano tuning and technician
- Greg Calbi – mastering at Sterling Sound, New York City, USA
- Stephanie Faraci – project coordinator
- Darryl Pitt – project coordinator
- David Sholemson – project coordinator
- Carrie D'Amelio – release coordinator
- Theodora Kuslan – release coordinator
- Gil Goldstein – music preparation
- Hollis King – art direction
- Rebecca Meek – design
- Sylvia Otti – cover photography
- Michael Piazza – photography
- Ken Takewaki – photography

== Charts ==
Chart (2001)	Peak position
US Billboard Top Jazz Albums	5

== Awards ==
2001 - 44th Annual GRAMMY Awards

Year	Winner	Title	Category
2001	Michael Brecker	"Chan's Song"	Best Jazz Instrumental Solo
2001	James Taylor	"Don't Let Me Be Lonely Tonight"	Best Male Pop Vocal Performance
