= Alma y Vida =

Argentinian musical group

Alma y Vida were a musical group in Argentina during the first half of the 1970s. Composed of jazz musicians that turned to rock music in the late 1960s (Carlos Mellino was a member of The Seasons), while other future members were regular visitors at the historic La Cueva club, Alma y Vida were pioneers in Argentina of jazz-rock in the vein of Blood, Sweat & Tears, group whose music influenced the band's formative sound.

== Original members ==
- Carlos Mellino: voice and keyboards
- Juan Barrueco: guitar
- Alberto Hualde: drums
- Bernardo Baraj: saxophone
- Carlos Villalba: bass
- Mario Salvador: horns

== History ==
Once they settled on a style, Alma y Vida recorded their debut single: "Niño de color cariño" b/w "He comprendido", for the Mandioca label. Soon after, Gustavo Moretto replaced Mario Salvador on the horns, which would in hindsight be an important development. Alma y Vida then proceeded to sign with RCA to release their first self-titled album.

Alma y Vida was to be influenced by the huge success of Chicago's similar music proposal. 1971's homonymous debut featured hit songs "Mujer, gracias por tu llanto", "Veinte monedas" (with superb guitar) and "Lágrima de ciudad".

The band was increasingly popular in not-so-rock circles, particularly in so-called "trendy" clubs, yet only mildly received in the rock industry. But the strength of their sound would begin to reach crossover audiences, particularly after their 2nd full-length Alma y Vida II (another influence of Chicago was the title of the records). The track "Hoy Te Vamos a Cantar" was a significant hit.

Their third album, 1973's Del Gemido de un Gorrión, was arguably their strongest and one of the best rock releases of the period. It was sophisticated music, as much rock as mature melodies with some political leanings (to the left), predicting Argentine rock trends by about three years.

Alma y Vida released self-titled number IV for RCA in 1974. "Salven a Sebastián" ("Save Sebastian"), is widely seen as the biggest single in the group's catalog. And the rest of the album remains strong, the culmination of a half-decade of strong musical output that by 1975 had won rockers and music hall listeners alike.

But by then Gustavo Moretto gave the announcement he was stepping aside from Alma y Vida to pursue new musical horizons (he would form prog-rock act ALAS).

A now five member group released Alma y Vida V (number five), in early 1976. But the album showed clear signs of fatigue, in spite of a solid single in "Le daré su mano a Dios". That would be the end of the road for the group, with Carlos Mellino also leaving, but not before Alma y Vida left a delightful and gratifying sounding mark in the landscape of music of their time.
