= Street Dreams (Lyle Mays album) =

Studio album by Lyle Mays
- Released: 1988
- Genre: Jazz, jazz fusion
- Length: 50:37
- Label: Geffen
- Producer: Lyle Mays, Steven Cantor

Lyle Mays chronology
Lyle Mays (1986)	Street Dreams (1988)	Fictionary (1993)

Street Dreams is the second solo album by keyboardist Lyle Mays, released in 1988 by Geffen Records.

== Reception ==
Professional ratings
Review scores
Source	Rating
AllMusic	4/5 stars

The AllMusic review by Richard S. Ginell awards the album 4 stars and states "There's a lot of inventive, mostly easygoing music here, though if one must choose, the level is not as consistently high as on Mays' first album."

== Track listing ==
All tracks are written by Lyle Mays, except where noted.

No.	Title	Writer(s)	Length
1.	"Feet First"		4:24
2.	"August"		5:02
3.	"Chorinho"		4:17
4.	"Possible Straight"	Lyle Mays, Pat Metheny	3:20
5.	"Hangtime"		4:21
6.	"Before You Go"		6:53
7.	"Newborn"		1:39
8.	"Street Dreams 1"		1:42
9.	"Street Dreams 2"		11:04
10.	"Street Dreams 3"		3:07
11.	"Street Dreams 4"		4:48
Total length:			50:37

== Personnel ==
- Lyle Mays – piano, keyboards
- Marc Johnson – bass (2, 4, 5, 8, 9, 10, 11)
- Steve Rodby – bass (1, 6), conductor (8, 9, 10, 11)
- Peter Erskine – drums (5, 8, 9, 10, 11)
- Steve Gadd – drums (1)
- Steve Jordan – drums (4)
- Bill Frisell – guitar (2, 5, 7, 8, 9, 10, 11)
- Glen Velez – percussion (8, 9, 10, 11)
- Vicki Randle – percussion (8, 9, 10, 11), vocoder (6), voice (8, 9, 10, 11)
- David Taylor – bass trombone (1, 4, 6, 8, 9, 10, 11)
- Bob Malach – tenor saxophone (1, 4, 6, 8, 9, 10, 11), flute (1, 4, 6, 8, 9, 10, 11)
- Bob Mintzer – tenor saxophone (1, 4, 6, 8, 9, 10, 11), flute (1, 4, 6, 8, 9, 10, 11)
- Dave Bargeron – trombone (1, 4, 6, 8, 9, 10, 11)
- Keith O'Quinn – trombone (1, 4, 6, 8, 9, 10, 11)
- Chris Gekker – trumpet (8, 9, 10, 11)
- Chris Seiter – trombone (4)
- Laurie Frink – trumpet (1, 4, 6, 8, 9, 10, 11)
- Robert Millikan – trumpet (1, 4, 6, 8, 9, 10, 11)
- Randy Brecker – trumpet (4)
- Stephen Taylor – English horn (8, 9, 10, 11)
- Liz Mann – flute (8, 9, 10, 11)
- William Blount – bass clarinet (8, 9, 10, 11)
- Mayuki Fukuhara – violin (8, 9, 10, 11), concertmaster (8, 9, 10, 11)
- Masako Yanagita – violin (8, 9, 10, 11)
- Robin Bushman – violin (8, 9, 10, 11)
- Paul Peabody – violin (8, 9, 10, 11)
- Marilyn Reynolds – violin (8, 9, 10, 11)
- Mineko Yajima – violin (8, 9, 10, 11)
- Erica Kiesewetter – violin (8, 9, 10, 11)
- Eriko Sato – violin (8, 9, 10, 11)
- Mitsuru Tsuboka – violin (8, 9, 10, 11)
- Rob Shaw – violin (8, 9, 10, 11)
- Martin Agee – violin (8, 9, 10, 11)
- Laura Seaton – violin (8, 9, 10, 11)
- Aloysia Friedmann – violin (8, 9, 10, 11)
- Jill Levy – violin (8, 9, 10, 11)
- Louise Schulman – viola (8, 9, 10, 11)
- Jennie Hansen – viola (8, 9, 10, 11)
- Stephanie Fricker – viola (8, 9, 10, 11)
- Ron Lawrence – viola (8, 9, 10, 11)
- Richard Locker – cello (8, 9, 10, 11)
- Rosalyn Clarke – cello (8, 9, 10, 11)
- Eric Samuels – cello (8, 9, 10, 11)
- Joshua Gordon – cello (8, 9, 10, 11)
- Jonathan Spitz – cello (8, 9, 10, 11)
- Lutz Rath – cello (8, 9, 10, 11)
- Erich Kory – cello (8, 9, 10, 11)
- Astrid Schween – cello (8, 9, 10, 11)
- Yari Bond – cello (8, 9, 10, 11)

Production

- Lyle Mays – producer
- Steven Cantor – producer
- Steve Rodby – additional production
- Pat Metheny – executive producer
- Rob Eaton – mixing engineer, recording engineer
- Alex Haas – mixing engineer (assistant), recording engineer (assistant)
- Bill Kipper – mastering engineer
- David Sholemson – project coordinator
- Jeri Heiden – art direction, design
- Bradford Fowler – photography
- David Cantor – photography
