= The Falcon and the Snowman (album) =

Soundtrack album by Pat Metheny Group
- Released: February 22, 1985
- Recorded: September 1984
- Studios: Odyssey Studios, London
- Genre: Jazz fusion
- Length: 38:23
- Label: EMI America
- Producers: Pat Metheny, Lyle Mays

Pat Metheny chronology
First Circle (1984)	The Falcon and the Snowman (1985)	Song X (1986)

Singles from The Falcon and the Snowman
- 1. "This Is Not America" Released: January 28, 1985

Professional ratings
Review scores
Source	Rating
AllMusic	4.5/5 stars

The Falcon and the Snowman is the soundtrack album to the film The Falcon and the Snowman (1985), composed and produced by Pat Metheny and Lyle Mays and performed by the Pat Metheny Group. It includes the song "This Is Not America", a major hit sung by David Bowie. The music is performed by the Pat Metheny Group with occasional orchestra and choir.

== Track listing ==
All songs written by Pat Metheny and Lyle Mays except "This Is Not America", lyrics by David Bowie.

Side one:
No.	Title	Length
1.	"Psalm 121/Flight of the Falcon"	4:09
2.	"Daulton Lee"	5:59
3.	"Chris"	3:21
4.	"The Falcon" (Note: The title of this track is enclosed in quotation marks in the recording's track listing, presumably not a typographical oversight.)	5:02

Side two:
No.	Title	Length
1.	"This Is Not America"	3:55
2.	"Extent of the Lie"	4:18
3.	"The Level of Deception"	5:49
4.	"Capture"	4:03
5.	"Epilogue (Psalm 121)"	2:16

== Personnel ==
- Pat Metheny – acoustic and electric guitars, guitar synthesizer
- Lyle Mays – piano, synthesizers
- Steve Rodby – acoustic and electric bass
- Paul Wertico – drums, percussion
- Pedro Aznar – vocals on "Daulton Lee" and "The Falcon"
- David Bowie – vocals and lyrics on "This Is Not America"
- National Philharmonic Orchestra (conducted by Steve Rodby) on "Flight of the Falcon", "Extent of the Lie", "The Level of Deception", and "Capture"
- Ambrosian Choir (conducted by John McCarthy) on "Psalm 121" and "Epilogue (Psalm 121)"

== Charts ==
Chart (1985)	Peak position
Canada Top Albums/CDs (RPM)	52
Dutch Albums (Album Top 100)	46
German Albums (Offizielle Top 100)	44
US Billboard 200	54
