= Bicicleta (album) =

Studio album by Serú Girán
- Released: November 1980
- Recorded: September–October 1980
- Studios: Estudios ION, Del Cielito Studios and Pedro Aznar's house
- Genres: Jazz fusion, progressive rock
- Length: 41:10
- Producer: Serú Girán

Serú Girán chronology
La Grasa de las Capitales (1978)	Bicicleta (1980)	Peperina (1981)

Bicicleta is the third studio album recorded by the Argentinian rock group Serú Girán, released in 1980. The album is widely considered by fans and critics alike to be one of the group's finest, and subsequently went on to be ranked by the Rolling Stone as the 68th best Argentinian album of all time.

The album described with delicate and admirable accuracy the Argentine social and political times under the dictatorship. "Canción de Alicia en el país" ("Song of Alice in the Land") and "Encuentro con el diablo" ("Encounter with the Devil") are the songs that best described that social reality according to music historian, Sergio Pujol. To avoid censorship, "Canción de Alicia en el país" painted Argentina's reality using metaphors inspired on the book Alice in Wonderland. Charly García described the feelings of young and middle-aged adults in the songs "A los jóvenes de ayer" ("To the Youth of Yesterday") and "Mientras miro las nuevas olas" ("While I Watch the New Waves") who were ambivalent or critical about old tango idols and emerging New Wave music respectively.

Bicicleta - which was also the initial name proposed by Charly for the band but was rejected by the rest of the group - was officially launched at the Estadio Obras Sanitarias stadium on June 6 and 7, 1980. For the concerts, the stage was adorned with wheels of bicycles, rabbits and flowers. The scenery made an impact on the attendants and on the media, being Serú Girán the first group that put some thought about the staging. Serú Girán had delegated scenic responsibility to choreographer Renata Schussheim, who was an old friend of Charly. Bicicleta marked the beginning of Serú Girán's successful shows.

On December 30, 1980, the group gave a historic free concert in La Rural, which was organized by the public TV channel ATC as part of its series of concerts named "Música prohibida para mayores" ("Music Forbidden for Adults"). The concert drew more than 60,000 attendants, making Serú the first Argentine band to have such live venue audience

== Track listing ==
Side one

1. "A los jóvenes de ayer" [To yesterday's youth] (García) - (9:25)
2. "Cuánto tiempo más llevará" [How much longer will it take] (Lebón) - (3:56)
3. "Canción de Alicia en el país" [Song of Alice in the Land] (García) - (4:26)
4. "La luna de marzo" [The moon of March] (Aznar)- (3:28)

Side two

1. "Mientras miro las nuevas olas" [While I watch the new waves] (García) - (3:58)
2. "Desarma y sangra" [Disarm and bleed] (García) - (3:39)
3. "Tema de Nayla" [Nayla's song] (Lebón) - (6:54)
4. "Encuentro con el Diablo" [Meeting with the devil] (García/Lebón) - (5:05)

== Personnel ==
- Charly García – Lead vocals(tracks 1, 3, 5, 6), piano, Yamaha CP-70 Electric grand piano, Wurlitzer electric piano, Minimoog, Moog Opus 3, electric guitar, acoustic guitar, backing vocals
- David Lebón – Lead vocals (tracks 2, 7, 8), electric guitar, acoustic guitar, Percussion, backing vocals
- Pedro Aznar – electric and fretless bass, Oberheim OB-X, backing vocals, guitar
- Oscar Moro – drums, Percussion

=== Additional Musicians ===
- Diego Rapoport – Fender Rhodes solo on "Tema de Nayla"
- Benny Izaguirre, Bernardo Baraj, Luis Casalla - horns on "Encuentro con El Diablo"
