= Serú Girán (album) =

Studio album by Serú Girán
- Released: November 1978
- Genre: Symphonic rock, progressive rock
- Length: 30:46
- Label: Music Hall

Serú Girán chronology
Serú Girán (1978)	La Grasa de las Capitales (1979)

Serú Girán is the debut album by the eponymous band, brainchild of Charly García. It was recorded partly in Brazil and in the United States, and was released in 1978.

Although initially poorly received by critics and fans, in part due to its unconventional symphonic rock influences, the album is now considered one of the finest progressive rock albums in Spanish, containing many Argentine rock standards.

== Track listing ==
- All songs written and composed by Charly García, except where noted.

Side one

1. "Eiti-Leda" - 7:05
2. "El Mendigo en el Andén" [The Beggar on the Platform] (David Lebón, Charly García) - 3:53
3. "Separata" - 1:36
4. "Autos, Jets, Aviones, Barcos" [Cars, Jets, Planes, Boats] - 4:15

Side two

1. "Serú Girán" - 6:55
2. "Seminare" - 3:27
3. "Voy a Mil" [I'm Going at a Thousand] (David Lebón, Charly García) - 3:06
4. "Cosmigonón" (David Lebón) - 1:33

== Personnel ==
- Charly García – piano, Yamaha CP-70 Electric grand piano, Minimoog, string synthesizer, acoustic guitar, lead vocals (on "Eiti-Leda", "Separata" and "Serú Girán")
- David Lebón – electric guitar, acoustic guitar, lead vocals (except on "Eiti-Leda", "Separata" and "Cosmigonon")
- Pedro Aznar – electric and fretless bass, backing vocals
- Oscar Moro – drums, percussion
