= Letter from Home (album) =

Studio album by Pat Metheny Group
- Released: June 29, 1989
- Recorded: Spring 1989
- Studios: Power Station, New York City
- Genres: Jazz fusion, smooth jazz
- Length: 61:39
- Label: Geffen
- Producer: Pat Metheny

Pat Metheny chronology
Still Life (Talking) (1987)	Letter from Home (1989)	Question and Answer (1990)

Professional ratings
Review scores
Source	Rating
AllMusic	4.5/5 stars

Letter from Home is the sixth studio album by the Pat Metheny Group. It was released in 1989 by Geffen Records. In 1990, the album won the Grammy Award for Best Jazz Fusion Performance, and it was certified Gold by the RIAA on July 23, 1998.

The album marked the return of Pedro Aznar, who first appeared on the album First Circle.

== Awards ==
Grammy Awards

Year	Category
1990	Grammy Award for Best Jazz Fusion Performance

== Track listing ==
All tracks are written by Pat Metheny except where noted.

Side one:
No.	Title	Writer(s)	Length
1.	"Have You Heard"		6:25
2.	"Every Summer Night"		7:13
3.	"Better Days Ahead"		3:02
4.	"Spring Ain't Here"		6:55
5.	"45/8"	Metheny, Mays	0:56
6.	"5-5-7"	Metheny, Mays	7:54

Side two:
No.	Title	Writer(s)	Length
1.	"Beat 70"	Metheny, Mays	4:53
2.	"Dream of the Return"	Spanish lyrics by Pedro Aznar	5:25
3.	"Are We There Yet"	Mays	7:55
4.	"Vidala"	Pedro Aznar	3:04
5.	"Slip Away"		5:24
6.	"Letter from Home"		2:33

== Personnel ==
- Pat Metheny – acoustic and electric guitars, guitar synthesizer, 12-string guitar, soprano guitar, tiple, Synclavier
- Lyle Mays – piano, organ, accordion, trumpet, Synclavier
- Steve Rodby – acoustic and electric bass
- Paul Wertico – drums, caja, percussion
- Pedro Aznar – vocals, guitar, marimba, vibraphone, tenor saxophone, charango, melodica, pan pipe, percussion
- Armando Marçal – percussion

== Charts ==
Chart (1989)	Peak position
Canada Top Albums/CDs (RPM)	81
US Billboard 200	66
US Top Contemporary Jazz Albums (Billboard)	1

== Certifications ==
Region	Certification	Certified units/sales
United States (RIAA)	Gold	500,000^{^}
^{^} Shipments figures based on certification alone.
