= Travels (Pat Metheny Group album) =

Live album by Pat Metheny Group
- Released: 1983
- Recorded: July–November 1982
- Venue: Philadelphia, Dallas, Sacramento, Hartford, Nacogdoches
- Genre: Jazz fusion
- Length: 96:26
- Label: ECM
- Producer: Manfred Eicher, Pat Metheny

Pat Metheny chronology
Offramp (1982)	Travels (1983)	Rejoicing (1984)

Travels is a live double album by the Pat Metheny Group recorded in July, October, and November 1982 and released on ECM the following year. The quintet features pianist Lyle Mays and rhythm section Steve Rodby and Dan Gottlieb, with guest Nana Vasconcelos.

It won the Grammy Award for Best Jazz Fusion Performance.

== Background ==
The eleven tracks were recorded in Philadelphia, Dallas, Sacramento, Hartford, and Nacogdoches, Texas, while on tour in America for Offramp (1982).

== Reception ==
Professional ratings
Review scores
Source	Rating
AllMusic	4/5 stars
The Encyclopedia of Popular Music	4/5 stars
The Penguin Guide to Jazz Recordings	3/4 stars
The Rolling Stone Jazz Record Guide	3/5 stars

It was voted number 570 in the third edition of Colin Larkin's All Time Top 1000 Albums (2000).

== Track listing ==
All tracks are written by Pat Metheny and Lyle Mays except where noted.

Side I
No.	Title	Writer(s)	Length
1.	"Are You Going with Me?"		9:19
2.	"The Fields, the Sky"	Metheny	7:46
3.	"Goodbye"	Metheny	8:16

Side II
No.	Title	Writer(s)	Length
1.	"Phase Dance"		8:03
2.	"Straight on Red"		7:26
3.	"Farmer's Trust"	Metheny	6:25

Side III
No.	Title	Writer(s)	Length
1.	"Extradition"	Metheny	5:45
2.	"Goin' Ahead/As Falls Wichita, So Falls Wichita Falls"		16:22

Side IV
No.	Title	Writer(s)	Length
1.	"Travels"		5:03
2.	"Song for Bilbao"	Metheny	8:28
3.	"San Lorenzo"		13:35

== Personnel ==
=== Pat Metheny Group ===
- Pat Metheny – acoustic and electric guitars, guitar synthesizer
- Lyle Mays – piano, synthesizers, electric organ, autoharp, Synclavier
- Steve Rodby – acoustic and electric bass, bass synthesizer
- Danny Gottlieb – drums
- Nana Vasconcelos – percussion, voice, berimbau

=== Technical personnel ===
- Manfred Eicher, Pat Metheny – producer
- Jan Erik Kongshaug – mixing engineer
- Randy Ezratty – live recording engineer
- Gary Geller – assistant live recording engineer
- Dieter Rehm – design
- Dieter Rehm, Milan Horacek, Jähnig – cover photographs
- Ron Pownall – liner photographs

== Charts ==
Chart (1983)	Peak position
US Billboard 200	62
US Traditional Jazz Albums (Billboard)	8

== Awards ==
Grammy Awards

Year	Category
1984	Grammy Award for Best Jazz Fusion Performance
