= Alex Zuker =

Argentine musician

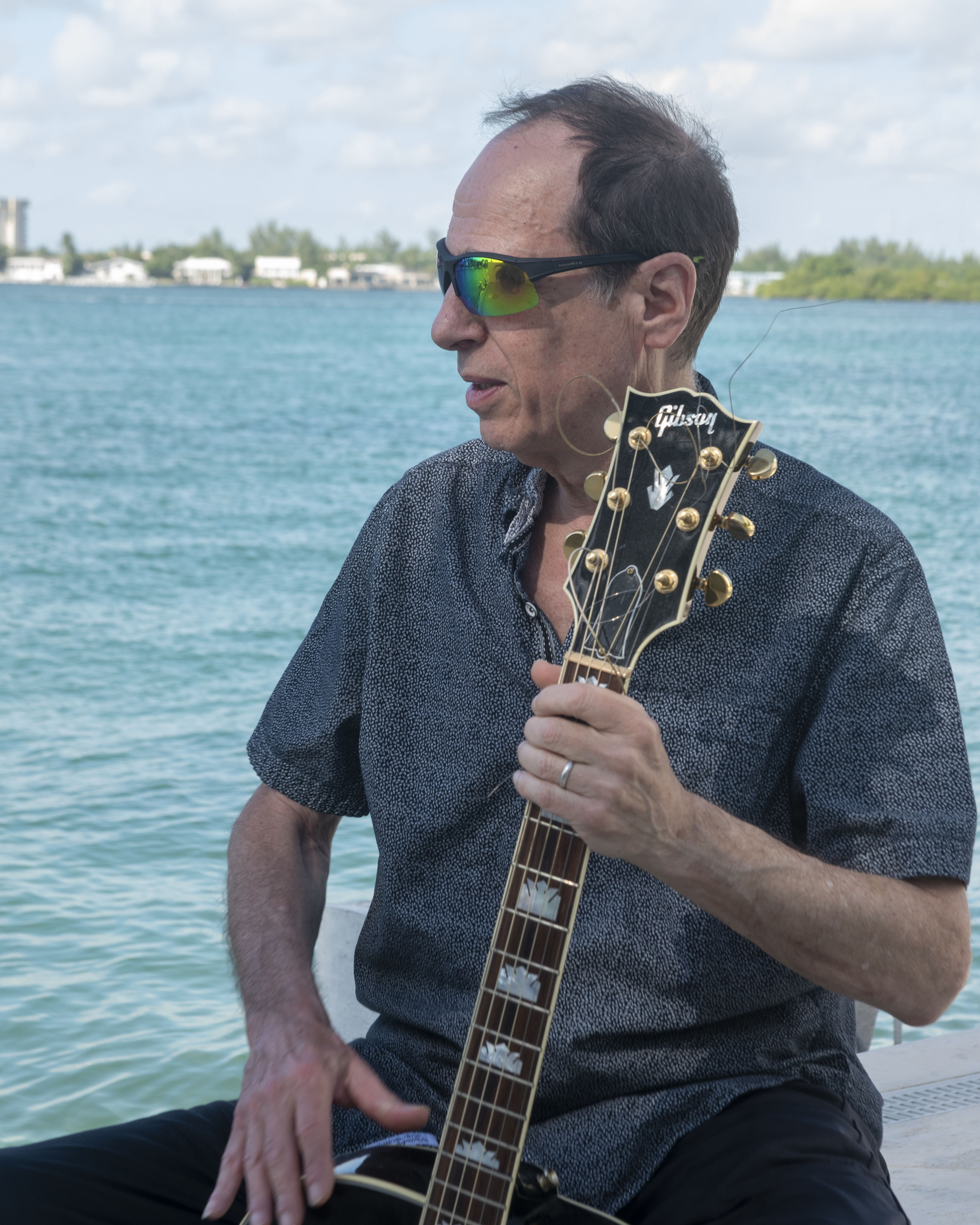
- Zucker in 2021

Background information
- Born: 25 April 1951 (age 75); Buenos Aires, Argentina
- Genres: Nuevo tango
- Occupations: Musician; composer
- Instrument: Bass guitar
- Years active: 1960s–present
- Formerly of: Alas

Alejandro "Alex" Zuker (born 25 April 1951 in Buenos Aires) is an Argentine bassist and composer.

== Early work and education ==
Born in Buenos Aires, Argentina, Alex Zuker began his musical studies at Buenos Aires' Conservatorio di Musica Santa Cecilia at age 8. He started his recording career as a bassist and composer around age 15 and has since toured and recorded with prominent Argentine groups, including Pedro y Pablo (Trova) and Mahatma (PolyGram). He later traveled to the United States, where he attended composition courses at the Berklee College of Music. He returned to Argentina in 1974 and formed the tango fusion band Alas together with Gustavo Moretto and Carlos Gustavo Riganti. Zuker was Alas's original bass guitar player and co-arranger; they toured extensively throughout South America. In 1980, he had a personal encounter with John Lennon, the details of which have been retold by the media through different sources like Universo Beat Radio, Página 12, and Breakfast with the Beatles. As guest bassist, he toured the USA with the tango fusion group Tanghetto in July 2018, culminating in a sold-out performance at New York City's Lincoln Center.

== Career and present work ==
Zuker has also worked as a bassist and composer with musicians including Edgar Winter, Steve Katz, Miguel Cantilo, Nito Mestre, Excalibur, the Innocents, Beledo, Alias4, Cumbo, Los Iracundos, and others. He has recorded sixteen albums, written children's and film music, and produced other artists' music.

== Discography ==
- Los Shimmy Devines, Estoy En La Carcel (Ion, 1968)
- Pedro y Pablo, Conesa (Trova, 1971)
- Mahatma, Descalzos En El Espacio (PolyGram, 1972)
- Alas, Aire/Mi Viejo Rincon (EMI, 1974)
- Alas, Alas (EMI, 1975)
- Melange, The Game (Josandra, 1980)
- Excalibur, Love Above All (Blue Sky, 1983)
- Edgar Winter Group, Come On (Blue Sky, 1986)
- Innocents, Living In Argentina (Evolution, 1995)
- Innocents, Innocents (Evolution, 1996)
- Almango, Baila Tango (Parker, 2000)
- Alas, Pinta Tu Aldea (Indy, 2002)
- Alas, Mimame Bandoneon (Sonoram, 2003)
- Alias4, Realidad y Supersticion (Park Slope, 2004)
