= Power Station (recording studio) =

Recording studio in Manhattan, New York City, US

Coordinates: 40°45′59″N 73°59′22″W

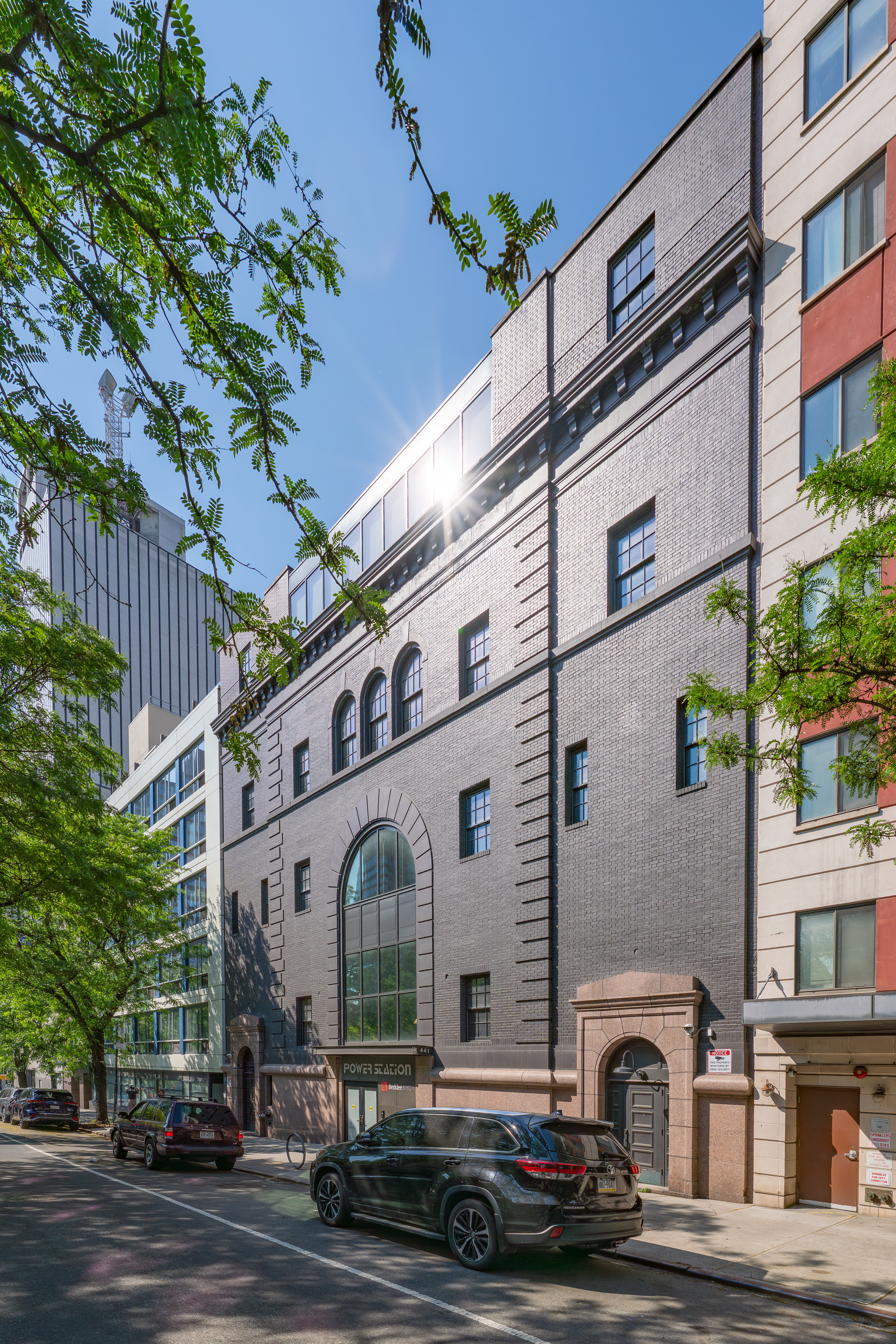
- Type: Recording studio
- Industry: Music
- Founded: 1977
- Headquarters: 441 West 53rd Street, New York City, U.S.
- Owner: Tony Bongiovi; Bob Walters
- Website: powerstation.nyc

Power Station at BerkleeNYC is a recording studio located at 441 West 53rd Street in the Hell's Kitchen neighborhood of Midtown Manhattan in New York City. It was originally founded in 1977 as Power Station and known as Avatar Studios from 1996 to 2017. Renowned for its exceptional acoustics, the studio has been the site of hundreds of gold, platinum, and Grammy Award-winning recordings.

== History ==
=== Background ===
Producer Tony Bongiovi and former Mediasound Studios co-worker engineer Bob Walters partnered to open the recording studio, putting together a team of people that included engineer Ed Stasium, Ed Evans, and Bob Clearmountain. They located an abandoned building at 441 West 53rd Street, between Ninth and Tenth avenues, in New York City's Hell's Kitchen neighborhood, which Bongiovi purchased from New York City for $360,000 as part of a building rehabilitation program. Bongiovi, Walters, and their team worked with Stephen B. Jacobs Associates to design a studio that would apply Bongiovi's ideas regarding acoustics, naming the new studio Power Station in acknowledgment of the building's origins as a former Consolidated Edison power station.

=== Power Station (1977–1996) ===
Power Station opened in 1977, The studio's largest room, Studio A, is a pine-paneled 52-by-48-foot (16 by 15 m) space with 35-foot (11 m) ceilings and several isolation booths and a control room equipped with a 40-channel Neve 8068 mixing console.

The new studio became a favorite for the Nile Rodgers/Bernard Edwards project Chic, which recorded several hit albums with Clearmountain at Power Station in the late 1970s. Chic's production team also collaborated on Sister Sledge's hit album We Are Family and Diana Ross' best-selling album Diana at the studios. In 1979, Ian Hunter recorded his album You're Never Alone with a Schizophrenic at the studio with members of Bruce Springsteen's E Street Band as the backing band. In 1979 Springsteen himself came to the Power Station to work on his album The River. Other albums recorded at the studio in 1980 included David Bowie's Scary Monsters (and Super Creeps), Carly Simon's Come Upstairs, Suicide's Ric Ocasek-produced sophomore album, and Dire Straits' Making Movies, co-produced by a young Jimmy Iovine.

Choosing Nile Rodgers to produce his next album, David Bowie returned to Power Station to record Let's Dance, which became Bowie's best-selling album. Dire Straits returned to the studio for Love over Gold (1982), and John Waite recorded his debut solo album there the same year. Roxy Music recorded Avalon at Power Station with Clearmountain, and Pat Metheny Group recorded the first of many albums they would record at the studios. In 1982, Jim Steinman produced two songs at Power Station that would simultaneously top the Billboard charts the following year: Bonnie Tyler's biggest career hit, "Total Eclipse of the Heart" and Air Supply's "Making Love Out of Nothing at All".

Mark Knopfler returned to the studio to record his award-winning soundtrack album Local Hero, and Bob Dylan recorded Infidels at Power Station in 1983. 1984 marked the recording of Bon Jovi's debut studio album, the band's frontman no other than studio co-founder Bongiovi's cousin Jon Bon Jovi, who had been working at the studio since 1980. The same year, Bruce Springsteen recorded much of his hit album Born in the U.S.A. at Power Station, and Madonna chose to record Like a Virgin with Nile Rodgers at the studio. In 1984, a supergroup composed of Robert Palmer, Chic drummer Tony Thompson, and Andy and John Taylor of Duran Duran came to the studio to record a one-off album, subsequently naming both the group and its debut album The Power Station after the studio where it was recorded. In 1986, Cyndi Lauper recorded True Colors and Peter Gabriel recorded So at Power Station. Other artists recording at the studio in the 1980s included Keith Jarrett, Bill Frisell, Grace Jones, Lou Reed, James Taylor, Bobby McFerrin, and Eurythmics.

In the 1990s, Jim Steinman returned to Power Station with Meat Loaf for the recording of Bat Out of Hell II: Back into Hell, and the studio became popular with jazz musicians, including John Scofield, Joshua Redman, and Diana Krall. By 1995, over 400 gold and platinum records had been recorded at Power Station, and that year, 9 of the 13 major Grammy award winners were recorded and/or mixed at Power Station.

=== Avatar Studios (1996–2016) ===
In May 1996, Chieko and Kirk Imamura bought the entire building from Bongiovi in a bankruptcy auction for $5.4 million, and continued to run the business as Avatar Studios (under the Avatar Entertainment Corporation).

In 2015, the studio was up for sale again, but the owners would only consider offers from buyers who want to keep it as a recording studio.

=== Power Station at BerkleeNYC (2017–present) ===
In September 2017, with the support of the New York City Mayor's Office of Media and Entertainment and the Economic Development Corporation, Pete Muller with Berklee College of Music acquired the studios and renamed them Power Station at BerkleeNYC. The studio reopened in 2020 after a full renovation, while maintaining the studio spaces.

== Power Station New England ==
In 1995, Sonalysts, which had begun as an underwater acoustics research company, licensed the Power Station's design and naming rights from Bongiovi and Walters. The company built a perfect replica of the original Studio A in Waterford, Connecticut, as a part of the new Power Station New England.

== Selected list of albums recorded at Power Station/Avatar (by year) ==
- Chic: Chic – 1977
- Chic: C'est Chic – 1978
- Chic: Risqué – 1979
- Ian Hunter: You're Never Alone with a Schizophrenic – 1979
- Sister Sledge: We Are Family – 1979
- Blondie : Eat to the Beat - 1979
- Bruce Springsteen: The River – 1980
- Carly Simon: Come Upstairs – 1980
- David Bowie: Scary Monsters (and Super Creeps) – 1980
- Diana Ross: Diana – 1980
- Dire Straits: Making Movies – 1980
- Suicide: Suicide: Alan Vega and Martin Rev – 1980
- Diana Ross: Why Do Fools Fall in Love – 1981
- Billy Squier: Don't Say No - 1981
- Aerosmith: Rock in a Hard Place – 1982
- David Bowie: Let's Dance – 1982
- Dire Straits: Love over Gold – 1982
- John Waite: Ignition – 1982
- Pat Metheny Group: Offramp (album) – 1982
- Roxy Music: Avalon – 1982
- Bob Dylan: Infidels – 1983
- Bonnie Tyler: Faster Than the Speed of Night – 1983
- Keith Jarrett: Standards, Vol. 1 – 1983
- Keith Jarrett: Changes – 1983
- Keith Jarrett: Standards, Vol. 2 – 1983
- Mark Knopfler: Local Hero (soundtrack) – 1983
- Bon Jovi: Bon Jovi – 1984
- Bruce Springsteen: Born in the U.S.A. – 1984
- Madonna: Like a Virgin – 1984
- Pat Metheny Group: First Circle – 1984
- The Power Station: The Power Station – 1984
- Stevie Ray Vaughan and Double Trouble: Couldn't Stand the Weather – 1984
- Bill Frisell: Rambler (1985)
- Grace Jones: Slave to the Rhythm – 1985
- Cyndi Lauper: True Colors – 1986
- Lou Reed: Mistrial – 1986
- Peter Gabriel: So – 1986
- Bill Frisell: Lookout for Hope (1988)
- James Taylor: Never Die Young – 1987
- Pat Metheny Group: Still Life (Talking) – 1987
- Bobby McFerrin: Simple Pleasures – 1988
- Eurythmics: We Too Are One – 1989
- Pat Metheny Group: Letter from Home – 1989
- Carly Simon: My Romance – 1990
- John Scofield: Time on My Hands – 1990
- John Scofield: Meant to Be – 1991
- Keith Jarrett: "Bye Bye Blackbird" – 1991
- Pat Metheny Group: Secret Story – 1992
- John Scofield Quartet: What We Do – 1993
- Joshua Redman: Joshua Redman – 1993
- Meat Loaf: Bat Out of Hell II: Back into Hell – 1993
- Joshua Redman Quartet: MoodSwing – 1994
- Diana Krall: Only Trust Your Heart – 1995
- Joshua Redman: Freedom in the Groove – 1996
- Michael Brecker: Tales from the Hudson – 1996 (2 Grammys)
- Journey: Trial By Fire – 1996
- Aerosmith: Nine Lives – 1996
- Gary Burton with Chick Corea, Pat Metheny, Roy Haynes, Dave Holland: Like Minds – 1998
- Michael Brecker: Two Blocks from the Edge – 1998
- The Black Crowes: By Your Side – 1999
- Joe Jackson: Symphony No. 1 – 1999
- Michael Brecker: Time Is of the Essence – 1999
- Little Steven: Born Again Savage – 1999
- Ryo Fukui: Ryo Fukui in New York – 1999
- Journey: Arrival – 2001
- Björk: Vespertine – 2001
- Natalie Cole: Ask a Woman Who Knows – 2002
- Hiromi: Another Mind – 2002
- Norah Jones: Feels like Home – 2004
- Anthrax: The Greater of Two Evils – 2004
- John Mayer: Continuum – 2006
- John Patitucci: Line by Line – 2006
- Deborah Cox: Destination Moon – 2007
- Dream Theater: Systematic Chaos – 2007
- Herbie Hancock: River: The Joni Letters – 2007

== Producers and engineers associated with Power Station/Avatar ==
- Tony Bongiovi (co-founder, producer and engineer)
- Bob Clearmountain (engineer)
- Nile Rodgers
- Bruce Springsteen (producer)
- Jim Steinman (producer and songwriter)
- Josh Abbey
- Jimmy Iovine (producer)
- Jeff Bova
- Neil Dorfsman (engineer)
- Scott Litt (engineer)
- Jeff Hendrickson (engineer)
- Roy Hendrickson (engineer)
- Bruce Lamcov (engineer)
- Dave O'Donnell (engineer)
- Jason Cosaro (engineer)
- Larry Alexander (engineer)
- Malcolm Pollack (engineer)
- Bill "Bear" Scheniman (engineer)
- James Farber (engineer)
- Garry Rindfuss (engineer)
- Steve Boyer (engineer)
- Kevin Shirley
