= Barbara Wojirsch =

German graphic designer

Barbara Wojirsch (born 1940) is a German graphic designer known primarily for developing the visual style for album covers released by ECM Records.

== Early life ==
Wojirsch studied painting at the Stuttgart Academy of Fine Arts. A realization that there are many good painters in the world led her to take up advertising for a short time, but she was disillusioned with the idea of telling people "things that aren't true."

== ECM Records ==
In 1970, Wojirsch and her husband Burkhardt began designing covers for ECM (Edition of Contemporary Music), Manfred Eicher's newly formed jazz recording label headquartered in Munich. The couple jointly signed their work B & B Wojirsch in a collaboration that continued until Burkhardt's untimely death in the mid 1970s. After her husband's death, Wojirsch continued to work for ECM. In 1978 photographer Dieter Rehm joined ECM's staff. By the time Wojirsch retired in the mid 1990s, she had designed more than 200 covers for ECM recording artists including Chick Corea, David Holland, Keith Jarrett, Pat Metheny and Steve Reich.

Wojirsch's distinct aesthetic approach rooted in minimalism and modernism complemented the clear, pristine sounds that are Eicher's signature. The influence of modern artists including Cy Twombly is evident in some of her designs, particularly on covers like Pat Metheny's Rejoicing and Jan Garbarek's It's OK to Listen to the Gray Voice. Her distinct handwriting serves as the central graphic for a variety of albums including 80/81 by Pat Metheny Group and Tribute by Keith Jarrett, Gary Peacock and Jack DeJohnette. In 1978, Wojirsch's design for the Steve Kuhn album, Non-Fiction, was a nominee in the 21st Grammy Awards.
