= Still Life (Talking) =

Studio album by Pat Metheny Group
- Released: July 7, 1987
- Recorded: March–April 1987
- Studios: Power Station, New York City
- Genre: Jazz fusion
- Length: 42:30
- Label: Geffen
- Producer: Pat Metheny

Pat Metheny chronology
Song X (1986)	Still Life (Talking) (1987)	Letter from Home (1989)

Professional ratings
Review scores
Source	Rating
AllMusic	4.5/5 stars
The Encyclopedia of Popular Music	4/5 stars
The Penguin Guide to Jazz Recordings	2.5/4 stars

Still Life (Talking) is the fifth studio album by the Pat Metheny Group. It was released in 1987 on Geffen Records. It won the Grammy Award for Best Jazz Fusion Performance and was certified gold by the RIAA on July 2, 1992.

In 2015, "Last Train Home" was used as the ending theme for "Battle in Egypt", the second half of the anime series JoJo's Bizarre Adventure: Stardust Crusaders.

== Track listing ==
All tracks are written by Pat Metheny except where noted.

Side one:
No.	Title	Writer(s)	Length
1.	"Minuano (Six Eight)"	Metheny, Mays	9:28
2.	"So May It Secretly Begin"		6:25
3.	"Last Train Home"		5:41

Side two:
No.	Title	Writer(s)	Length
1.	"(It's Just) Talk"		6:17
2.	"Third Wind"	Metheny, Mays	8:37
3.	"Distance"	Mays	2:45
4.	"In Her Family"		3:17

== Personnel ==
- Pat Metheny – acoustic and electric guitars, guitar synthesizer
- Lyle Mays – piano, keyboards
- Steve Rodby – acoustic and electric bass
- Paul Wertico – drums
- Armando Marçal – percussion, backing vocals
- Mark Ledford – vocals
- David Blamires – vocals

== Charts ==
Years	Chart	Position
1987	Billboard Jazz Albums	1
1987	Billboard Black Albums	43
1987	Billboard Pop Albums	86

== Certifications ==
Region	Certification	Certified units/sales
United States (RIAA)	Gold	500,000^{^}
^{^} Shipments figures based on certification alone.

== Awards ==
Grammy Awards

Year	Category
1988	Grammy Award for Best Jazz Fusion Performance
