= Serú Girán =

Argentine rock band

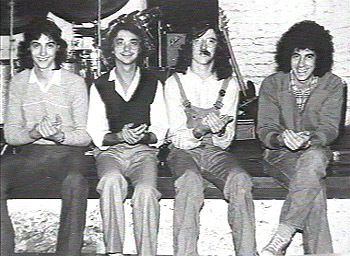
- Serú Girán, 1978

Background information
- Origin: Buenos Aires, Argentina
- Genres: Progressive rock; jazz fusion; symphonic rock; progressive pop
- Years active: 1978–1982; 1992–1993
- Labels: Music Hall Records; Sony Music
- Past members: Charly García; David Lebón; Pedro Aznar; Oscar Moro

Serú Girán was an Argentine rock supergroup. Formed in 1978, the group consisted of Charly García (keyboards, synthesizers and vocals), David Lebón (guitars and vocals), Oscar Moro (drums and percussion), and Pedro Aznar (electric and fretless bass and vocals). Prior to this, the first three were already consecrated musicians through their previous bands. It is considered one of the best in the history of rock en español, both musically and conceptually, including the staging.

== History ==
=== Formation, beginnings and first album (1978) ===
Serú Girán was born after the separation of the band La Máquina de Hacer Pájaros which Charly García had organized in his early post-Sui Generis. Along with David Lebón, Charly García traveled to Búzios (Brazil) in 1978, with the idea of writing songs for a new album. After their return to Buenos Aires, García met the young and talented bass player Pedro Aznar. They were then joined by Oscar Moro, who was the drummer of La Máquina de Hacer Pájaros and formerly of the legendary group Los Gatos.

The band Billy Bond and the Jets was formed by Charly García, Billy Bond, David Lebón, Pedro Aznar and Oscar Moro. They released a single album with tracks like "Discoshock", "Toda la Gente" ("Everybody"), and "Loco, ¿No te sobra una moneda?" ("Man, don't you have a coin to spare?"). Finally Billy Bond dismantled the project, and the rest of its members formed Serú Girán.

The beginnings of the band were difficult. Its first album, Serú Girán (released in 1978), did not have a good reception even though some of its songs (notably "Seminare" and "Eiti Leda") would become public anthems. The first public appearance of the band was in a boat over the Riachuelo river. What inspired García to do this was the revolutionary band "Los Jóvenes de Ayer". In its debut, the band was joined by the orchestral collaborations of Daniel Goldberg, who recorded with 24 musicians in United States.

The official presentation of the debut album Serú Girán was held in Estadio Obras Sanitarias on November 3, 1978 with an orchestra of 24 musicians (string section and wind) and closed circuit television. In the back of the stage, a giant screen showed the musicians on stage. Lebón, Aznar and Moro were dressed in white, while Charly chose a jacket, a black mesh bag and sneakers. The beginning of the recital, with the full orchestra playing the powerful intro of the song "Serú Girán", presaged an unforgettable night. However, it did not go well. The audience didn't get the satire behind the song "Discoshock", which is about the disco music in vogue at the time, and was taken aback. Amid a chorus of whistles, the crowd asked the musicians to play "Blues del levante", a song written by García at the end of his Sui Generis tenure. The rest of the concert went to general indifference.

=== La Grasa de las Capitales (1979) ===
Serú Girán released La Grasa de las Capitales a year later in 1979. The word "grasa" means "grease" in Spanish, but in Argentina it is also slang for "tacky". As such, the title of the album was a criticism of Argentine society at the time (which was living under a military dictatorship following the 1976 coup) specially critical of what it was considered then "commercial" music (as opposed to the more elaborate lyrics and musicianship supposedly present in genres such as prog-rock) with disco music being parodied in the self-titled first track, the cover of the album itself being a spoof of popular Gente magazine. "Viernes 3 A.M." (Friday 3 A.M,) and "Noche de Perros" ("Dog's night") were the best performing tracks of Serú Girán's second album. "Viernes 3 AM" would be banned from the radios for a time by the dictatorship because it was considered to incite suicide. In 2007, the Argentine edition of Rolling Stone ranked it 17 on its list of "The 100 Greatest Albums of National Rock".

The official release of La Grasa de las Capitales was held at a number of venues in September and October 1979 including the Buenos Aires Auditorium (Ex - Kraft).

=== Bicicleta and success (1980) ===
In 1980, the album Bicicleta ("Bicycle") was released. The album described with delicate and admirable accuracy the Argentine social and political times under the dictatorship. "Canción de Alicia en el país" ("Song of Alice in the Land") and "Encuentro con el diablo" ("Encounter with the Devil") are the songs that best described that social reality according to music historian, Sergio Pujol. To avoid censorship, "Canción de Alicia en el país" painted Argentina's reality using metaphors inspired on the book Alice in Wonderland. Charly García described the feelings of young and middle-aged adults in the songs "A los jóvenes de ayer" ("To the Youth of Yesterday") and "Mientras miro las nuevas olas" ("While I Watch the New Waves") who were ambivalent about old tango idols and emerging New Wave music respectively.

Bicicleta, which was also the initial name proposed by Charly for the band but was rejected by the rest of the group, was officially launched at the Estadio Obras Sanitarias stadium on June 6 and 7, 1980. For the concerts, the stage was adorned with wheels of bicycles, rabbits and flowers. The scenery made an impact on the attendants and on the media, with Serú Girán being the first group that put some thought into the staging. Serú Girán had delegated scenic responsibility to choreographer Renata Schussheim, who was an old friend of Charly. Bicicleta marked the beginning of Serú Girán's successful shows.

A month later, in August 1980, Serú performed at the Monterey Jazz Festival in Rio de Janeiro. In general, the Argentine musicians going to the festival were related mostly to jazz or tango sounds, while Serú proposed a progressive rock act. That year the concert had two parts: Serú Girán, American guitarist Pat Metheny and George Duke performed in the first half. The success of the Argentine band in the first half was such that the organizers offered Serú Girán to play again in the second half along with John McLaughlin, Hermeto Pascoal Egberto Gismonti, and the group Weather Report.

García remembers about the Monterey Jazz Festival that: "When McLaughlin was playing, people skated and threw paper airplanes. I was dying of Embarrassment! If they did that to McLaughlin, they would throw more stuff at us". However, his prediction was wrong. The main reason of the public's favorable response may lie in the variety of nuances in the songs, some, with a cadence that invites to dance. At this festival, Aznar met Jaco Pastorius.

On December 30, 1980, the group gave a historic free concert in La Rural, which was organized by the public TV channel ATC as part of its series of concerts named "Music forbidden for adults". The concert drew more than 60,000 attendants, making Serú the first Argentine band to have such live audience.

=== Peperina, No llores por mí, Argentina and separation (1981–1982) ===
The next album Peperina (1981) was marked by compositions such as "Llorando en el espejo" ("Crying in the Mirror"), "Esperando Nacer" ("Waiting to be Born"), "Cinema Verité" and "Peperina". The official release of the album was held at Obras Sanitarias on 4, 5 and 6 September 1981. The album cover was designed by Clota Ponieman, with photos picked by him and Charly.

When Aznar decided to leave the band to study at Berklee College of Music (Boston, Massachusetts, USA), Serú organized a series of concerts in advance of the possible break up of the band. Serú Girán's future was uncertain. At beginning of 1982, the track recorded in these concerts, No Llores por Mí Argentina ("Don't Cry for me Argentina"), was one of the best sellers of that year.

Later this year, arguments between García, Lebón and Moro (in particular the first two) on how to replace Aznar and the group's future led the band to dissolve.

=== Comeback and Serú '92 (1992–1993) ===
Many years passed until the comeback of Serú Girán became a reality. García, Moro, Lebón and Aznar reunited in the early 1990s to make their last studio album, Serú '92 (1992), and embark on a tour that would be their last.

With the return of Serú, presentations were made in Rosario, Córdoba (in stadium Chateau Carreras), Montevideo (Centenario Stadium) and in Buenos Aires, with two performances at the stage of River Plate Stadium, the latter to gather 160.000 fans in total; the return of Serú marked a national record unthinkable for the country decades before: a local band playing a massive concert at a stadium, a place that was not the usual venue for this kind of gathering. Nevertheless, since then it has become a staple of popular rock bands in Argentina to play at soccer stadiums.

In 1993 the band released its second live album (and last live album, chronologically), En vivo ("Live").

=== Death of Oscar Moro and sporadic reunions (2006–present) ===
Drummer Oscar Moro died of a stomach hemorrhage in July 2006. The members of the band have since stated that there will not be a definitive reunion of Serú without Moro.

In late March and early April 2007, Pedro Aznar and David Lebón played a series of concerts together in the ND Ateneo theater. In their fifth show, on April 6, Charly García joined them on stage to play "Seminare". On July 26, 2007, a year after the passing of Moro, a tribute concert was organized in his honor, in which Charly García and Pedro Aznar played "Desarma y sangra" ("Disarm and bleed"), "Encuentro con el Diablo", "Mientras miro las nuevas olas" and "Esperando nacer".

On April 30, 2010, Lebón and Aznar were guest players during García's show at Luna Park Stadium to play "Seminare".

== Discography ==
=== Studio albums ===
Year	Disc	Discography
1978	Serú Girán	Music Hall
1979	La Grasa de las Capitales	Music Hall
1980	Bicicleta	SG Discos
1981	Peperina	SG Discos
1992	Serú '92	Sony Music

=== Live albums ===
Year	Disc	Discography
1982	No llores por mí, Argentina	SG Discos
1993	En vivo	Sony Music
2000	Yo no quiero volverme tan loco	Sony Music

=== Compilations ===
Year	Disc
1995	Oro (Serú Giran)
1996	El álbum
2000	Viernes 3 a.m

=== Other ===
Year	Disc	Notes
1988	Reunión secreta en TMA (Secret Meeting at TMA)	Improvisation session at a recording studio - Never officially released.

== Awards ==
They were awarded in the categories:

- Best live group,
- Best Composer (García),
- Best Keyboardist (García),
- Best guitarist (Lebón),
- Best bassist (Aznar),
- Best drummer (Moro),
- Disclosure group 1978,
- Best singer (Lebón) 1980 and 1981,
- Best song 1978 (Seminare) and 1981 (Peperina) y
- Best Album 1978 (Serú Girán)
