= Pedro Aznar =

Argentine musician and singer-songwriter (born 1959)

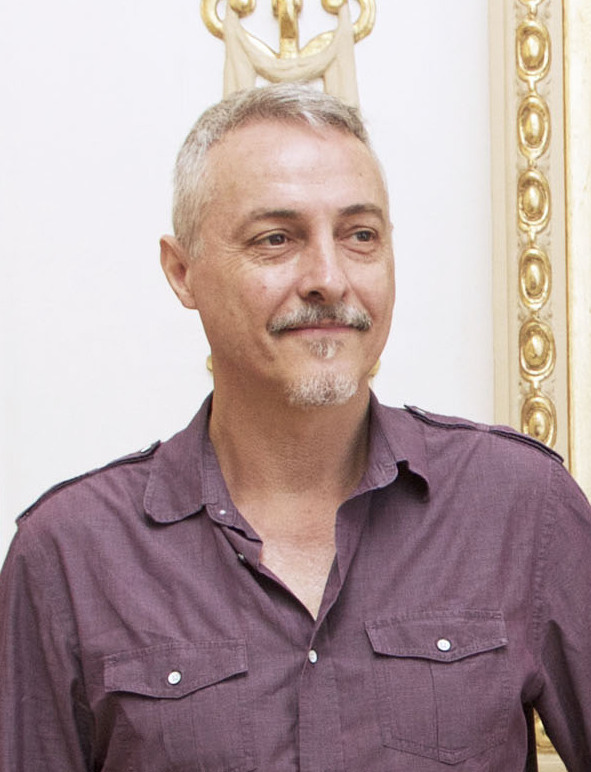
- Aznar in Mexico City, 2018

Background information
- Born: 23 July 1959 (age 67); Buenos Aires, Argentina
- Genres: Rock, jazz, folk
- Occupations: Musician, singer-songwriter
- Instruments: Vocals, bass, guitar, saxophone, steel drums, whistling.
- Label: Columbia
- Formerly of: The Pat Metheny Group
- Website: www.pedroaznar.com.ar/english/

Pedro Aznar (born 23 July 1959) is an Argentine musician and singer-songwriter. He has musical experience in jazz, Argentine folk and rock music and has a successful career as a solo artist. He is well known for giving rock songs a jazz-oriented style, by playing the fretless bass, with a big influence from Jaco Pastorius.

He is a multi-instrumentalist and the author of several books of poetry published in Argentina. He plays an important part in Argentine rock, where in the mid-1970s, he had various appearances with groups like Madre Atómica, Alas and Pastoral. He became one of four members of Serú Girán in 1978, one of the most musically influential bands that dominated Argentina's rock circuit for the next four years. In 1982 he accepted an invitation from Pat Metheny to join The Pat Metheny Group as a vocalist, with whom he recorded three Grammy Award-winning albums.

Later he began his solo career, while also working scoring music to film soundtracks. His 1991 album Tango 4 with Charly García as a duo went platinum and was named best rock album of the year in Argentina by the Argentine Association of Entertainment Critics. In 1990, he worked as a producer in Sandra Mihanovich and Celeste Carballo's album Mujer contra mujer.

== Discography ==
Album	Band	Year	Class
Pinta tu aldea	Alas	1977 (edited in 1983)	Studio
Billy Bond and the Jets	Billy Bond and the Jets	1978	Studio
Serú Girán	Serú Girán	1978	Studio
La grasa de las capitales	Serú Girán	1979	Studio
Bicicleta	Serú Girán	1980	Studio
Peperina	Serú Girán	1981	Studio
Yo no quiero volverme tan loco	Serú Girán	1981	Live (double album, released in 2000)
No llores por mí, Argentina	Serú Girán	1982	Live
Pedro Aznar	Pedro Aznar	1982	Studio
First Circle	Pat Metheny Group	1984	Studio
The Falcon and the Snowman	Pat Metheny Group	1985	Soundtrack
Contemplación	Pedro Aznar	1985	Studio
Tango	Charly García / Pedro Aznar	1986	Studio
Fotos de Tokio	Pedro Aznar	1986	Studio
Hombre mirando al sudeste	Pedro Aznar	1987	Soundtrack
Letter from Home	Pat Metheny Group	1989	Studio
Últimas imágenes del naufragio	Pedro Aznar	1990	Soundtrack
Radio Pinti	Charly García / Pedro Aznar / Enrique Pinti	1991	Studio
Tango 4	Charly García / Pedro Aznar	1991	Studio
Serú '92	Serú Girán	1992	Studio
The Road to You	Pat Metheny Group	1993	Live (recorded on European tour in 1991)
En vivo	Serú Girán	1993	Live (double album, recorded at River Plate Stadium in 1992)
El camino de los sueños	Pedro Aznar	1993	Soundtrack
David y Goliath	Pedro Aznar	1995	Studio
No te mueras sin decirme adónde vas	Pedro Aznar	1995	Soundtrack
El mundo contra mí	Pedro Aznar	1996	Soundtrack
Buenos Aires, 2067	Pedro Aznar	1997	Soundtrack
Cómplices	Pedro Aznar	1998	Soundtrack
Cuerpo y alma	Pedro Aznar	1998	Studio
Caja de música	Pedro Aznar	2000	Studio, poetry of Jorge Luis Borges
Huellas en la luz	Pedro Aznar	2001	Studio, movie soundtracks
Parte de volar	Pedro Aznar	2002	Studio
En vivo	Pedro Aznar	2002	Live
Cuando la lluvia te bese los pies	Pedro Aznar	2002	Studio (compilation – Mexico)
Mudras. Canciones de a dos	Pedro Aznar	2003	Studio
Indocumentados	Pedro Aznar	2004	Soundtrack
Un buda	Pedro Aznar	2005	Soundtrack
Aznar canta Brasil	Pedro Aznar	2005	Live
A Roar Of Southern Clouds	Pedro Aznar	2006	Studio (compilation)
Aznar – Lebón	Pedro Aznar – David Lebón	2007	Live (double album)
El Amor En Los Tiempos Del Cólera	Pedro Aznar	2007	Soundtrack
Quebrado	Pedro Aznar	2008	Studio (double album)
Quebrado vivo	Pedro Aznar	2009	Live (double album)
A solas con el mundo	Pedro Aznar	2010	Live
Ahora	Pedro Aznar	2012	Studio
Puentes Amarillos – Aznar celebra la música de Spinetta	Pedro Aznar	2012	Live (double album)
Mil noches y un instante	Pedro Aznar	2013	Live (double album)
Contraluz	Pedro Aznar	2016	Studio
Resonancia	Pedro Aznar	2017	Studio, EP
Abrazo de Hermanos	Pedro Aznar - Manuel García	2019	Studio
Utopía	Pedro Aznar - Ramiro Gallo	2020	Studio
Flor y Raíz	Pedro Aznar	2021	Studio
El mundo no se hizo en dos días	Pedro Aznar	2022	Studio (double album)
