= Lyle Mays =

American jazz musician (1953–2020)

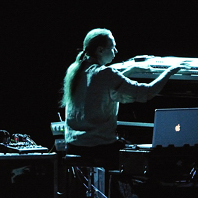
- Mays with the Pat Metheny Group in July 2010

Background information
- Born: Lyle David Mays; November 27, 1953; Wausaukee, Wisconsin, U.S.
- Died: February 10, 2020 (aged 66) Los Angeles, California, U.S.
- Genres: Jazz, Contemporary jazz
- Occupation: Musician
- Instruments: Piano, keyboards
- Years active: 1975–2020
- Labels: ECM, Geffen, Warner Bros.
- Website: lylemays.com

Lyle David Mays (November 27, 1953 – February 10, 2020) was an American jazz pianist, composer, and member of the Pat Metheny Group. Metheny and Mays composed and arranged nearly all of the group's music, for which Mays won eleven Grammy Awards.

External image
- Portrait of Lyle Mays by Michel Delsol (1988)

== Biography ==
While growing up in rural Wisconsin, Mays had a lot of curiosity but had to learn many things all by himself due to a lack of available resources and information. He had four main interests: chess, mathematics, architecture, and music. His mother Doris played piano and organ, and his father Cecil, a truck driver, taught himself to play guitar by ear. His teacher allowed him to practice improvisation after the structured elements of the lesson were completed. At the age of nine, he played the organ at a family member's wedding, and at fourteen he began to play in church. During his senior year of high school, at summer national stage band camp in Normal, Illinois, he was introduced to jazz pianist Marian McPartland.

Bill Evans at the Montreux Jazz Festival and Filles de Kilimanjaro by Miles Davis (both recorded in 1968) were important influences. He attended the University of North Texas after transferring from the University of Wisconsin–Eau Claire. He composed and arranged for the One O'Clock Lab Band and was the composer and arranger for the Grammy Award-nominated album Lab 75.

After leaving the University of North Texas, Mays toured in the US and Europe with Woody Herman's Thundering Herd (big band) for approximately eight months. In 1975, he met Pat Metheny at the Wichita Jazz Festival and soon afterward they co-founded the Pat Metheny Group. Mays served as pianist, keyboardist, sound designer, and a core contributing composer for the group over its entire thirty-three-year existence. The group was nominated for a Grammy twenty-three times and won the award eleven times.

After the Pat Metheny Group’s long-form recording The Way Up in 2005, a brief 2008-2009 Japan tour, and the "Songbook Tour" in Europe in 2010, Mays decided to retire from public music performance, although he did perform at the Western Michigan University Jazz Club in 2010 and at a Ted Talk event at Caltech in 2011 with his own groups. In an interview with JAZZIZ magazine in 2016, Mays said he had been working as a software development manager because of changes in the music industry.

== Work ==
Mays composed, orchestrated, and arranged as a core member of the Pat Metheny Group, playing piano, organ, synthesizers and, occasionally, trumpet, accordion, agogô bells, autoharp, toy xylophone, and electric guitar. He also composed, performed, and recorded dramatic scores for children's audiobooks, such as East of the Sun, West of the Moon, with text narrated by Max von Sydow; Moses the Lawgiver, told by Ben Kingsley; The Lion and the Lamb, narrated by Amy Grant and Christopher Reeve; and The Tale of Mr. Jeremy Fisher and Tale of Peter Rabbit, read by Meryl Streep. In 1985, Metheny's and Mays's compositions were performed by the Steppenwolf Theater in Chicago in the critically acclaimed production of Orphans by Lyle Kessler.

Mays was regarded by both professional musicians and music fans as one of the most innovative and creative jazz pianists and keyboardists, but he considered himself more of a serious contemporary composer with an advanced approach to classical music, harmonic aesthetics, and structural development through long forms. He composed several contemporary classical pieces, such as "Twelve Days in the Shadow of a Miracle", a piece for harp, flute, viola, and synthesizer recorded in 1996 by the Debussy Trio. Mays also composed "Distance" for Pat Metheny Group’s Grammy-winning and RIAA-certified Gold album, Still Life (Talking) (Geffen, 1987), "Mindwalk" in 2009 for marimba player Nancy Zeltsman, and previously "Somewhere in Maine" in 1988 for her duo with violinist Sharan Leventhal, Marimolin, and "Street Dreams 3" for his solo album, Street Dreams (Geffen, 1988) with top classical performers in New York City.

Apart from his work with Metheny, Mays formed his own trio with Marc Johnson (contrabass), Jack DeJohnette (drums), and Peter Erskine (drums) and formed the Lyle Mays Quartet with Marc Johnson or Eric Hochberg (contrabass), Mark Walker (drums), and Bob Sheppard (saxophone). In 2015, Naxos Germany released a live double album The Ludwigsburg Concert from their 1993 appearance (with Johnson) there.

One of Mays’ best-known compositions is "Close to Home," or "Mars" as it was initially called. He first recorded "Mars" in a 1977 session with the Dallas fusion band High Rise. The Pat Metheny Group performed the piece live between 1979 and 1982 with Metheny playing the main theme on guitar. Mays experimented widely with the introductory material, settling on the quintessential blend of synthesizer and piano for his eponymous album in 1986. Mays performed the piece on acoustic piano with his quartet as late as 1993. (See interactive timeline of his performances of "Close to Home" at this link.) The R&B/funk group Earth, Wind & Fire recorded "Close to Home" as an interlude on their 1990 album, Heritage. The prominent Brazilian singer-songwriter Milton Nascimento combined Mays' composition with Portuguese lyrics by Luis Avellar to create "Quem é Você," which was recorded on his 1991 live album, O Planeta Blue Na Estrada Do Sol. Another Brazilian singer, Zizi Possi, sang "Quem é Você" for her 1994 album, Valsa Brasileira.

Mays' Oberheim analog synthesizer and his voice counting the second hand of a clock at the recording session, "55..., 3..," which can be heard in the bridge (at 14:56) of the title track of As Falls Wichita, So Falls Wichita Falls (ECM, 1981), was used in commercials for Christian Dior's "Fahrenheit" from 1988 to 2016.

Beyond his use of Oberheim synthesizers as a signature sound, Mays collaborated with electronic keyboard instrument makers Kurzweil and Korg to develop sounds and technologies.

Since Mays was a young child, he was enthusiastic about architecture and constructed fantasy structures with LEGO bricks, keeping this passion through his later years. As an amateur architect, he designed his own house and home studio, and his sister Joan's house in Wisconsin. Mays was particularly influenced by his fellow Wisconsinian, architect and designer Frank Lloyd Wright, the father of American modernism. Much as Wright realized the innovative integration of different sources in creating his unique landscapes, Mays consistently sought to bring a deep, intellectual and organic appreciation of structural forms to his soundscape design, jazz composition and performance, and software development projects.

== Death and legacy ==
Mays died in Los Angeles at the age of 66 on February 10, 2020, "after a long battle with a recurring illness".

Mays was posthumously awarded the Grammy Award for Best Instrumental Composition at the 64th Annual Grammy Awards in 2022 for his composition "Eberhard," dedicated to the German double bassist and composer, Eberhard Weber.

== Discography ==
=== As leader ===
- Lyle Mays (Geffen, 1986)
- Street Dreams (Geffen, 1988)
- Fictionary (Geffen, 1993)
- Solo: Improvisations for Expanded Piano (Warner Bros., 2000)
- The Ludwigsburg Concert (Jazzhaus, 2015)
- Eberhard (self-released, 2021)

=== As co-leader ===
- As Falls Wichita, So Falls Wichita Falls with Pat Metheny (ECM, 1981)

=== As a member ===
One O'Clock Lab Band

- Lab 74 (NTSU Lab Jazz, 1974)
- Lab 75 (NTSU Lab Jazz, 1975)

Pat Metheny Group

- Pat Metheny Group (ECM, 1978)
- American Garage (ECM, 1979)
- Offramp (ECM, 1982)
- Travels (ECM, 1983)
- First Circle (ECM, 1984)
- The Falcon and the Snowman (EMI, 1985)
- Still Life (Talking) (Geffen, 1987)
- Letter from Home (Geffen, 1989)
- The Road to You (Geffen, 1993)
- We Live Here (Geffen, 1995)
- Quartet (Geffen, 1996)
- Imaginary Day (Warner Bros., 1997)
- Speaking of Now (Warner Bros., 2002)
- The Way Up (Nonesuch, 2005)

=== As sideman ===
With Pat Metheny

- Watercolors (ECM, 1977)
- Secret Story (Geffen, 1992)

With others

- Phil Wilson & Rich Matteson, The Sound of the Wasp (ASI, 1975)
- Steve Swallow, Home (ECM, 1980)
- Joni Mitchell, Shadows and Light (Asylum, 1980)
- Eberhard Weber, Later That Evening (ECM, 1982)
- Bob Moses, When Elephants Dream of Music (Gramavision, 1983)
- Mark Isham, Film Music (Windham Hill, 1985)
- Pedro Aznar, Contemplacion (Interdisc, 1985)
- Betty Buckley, Betty Buckley (Rizzoli, 1986)
- Bobby McFerrin, Medicine Music (EMI, 1990)
- Woody Herman, Live in Warsaw (Storyville, 1991)
- Paul McCandless, Premonition (Windham Hill, 1992)
- Igor Butman, Falling Out (Impromptu, 1993)
- Toots Thielemans, East Coast West Coast (Private Music, 1994)
- Nando Lauria, Points of View (Narada, 1994)
- Noa, Noa (Geffen, 1994)

=== Film and audiobook scoring ===
- The Tale of Mr. Jeremy Fisher & The Tale of Peter Rabbit (Rabbit Ears, 1988)
- East of the Sun, West of the Moon (Short Video) (Rabbit Ears, 1991)
- Moses the Lawgiver (Rabbit Ears, 1993)
- Mustang: The Hidden Kingdom (TV Movie documentary, 1994)
- The Lion and the Lamb (Short Animation) (Rabbit Ears, 1996)

== Transcription book ==
- The Music of Lyle Mays: Compositions, Transcriptions, and Musical Transformations - Transcribed and edited by Pierre J. Piscitelli, Lyle Mays (Author) (Independently published, 2021)
