= Roland GR-300 =

Guitar synthesizer

The Roland GR-300 is an analog guitar synthesizer manufactured by Roland Corporation. It was introduced to market in 1980.

The GR-300 was considered the first "playable" guitar synthesizer. (Its predecessor, the GR-500, was plagued with tracking problems that rendered it virtually unplayable.) The GR-300 had no MIDI (it had not been developed yet) and could initially only be played/controlled with a Roland G series guitar controller (originally offered with the G-303, G-505 and G-808, later the G-202 and it was backward-compatible with the G-707 and the GK-1 pickup system, released a few years later). Some guitar manufacturers like Gibson and Fender would later release "Roland Ready" guitars with the necessary electronics installed to use with the early Roland guitar synthesizers.

The synthesizer used internal circuitry to convert the guitar's pitch to a control voltage that would then be able to determine the pitch of the VCOs and trigger the envelope-controlled VCF, if enabled. This process required a hexaphonic pickup to be installed on the guitar, essentially sending 6 separate signals, one for each string on the guitar, to individual pitch-to-voltage conversion circuits in the synthesizer module.

The actual synthesizer module sat on the floor and had the rugged appearance of a large, bright blue guitar-type foot pedal (complete with carrying handles) and did not resemble an actual keyboard synthesizer at all. It featured six-voice polyphony, one voice per string and two oscillators per voice. Each pair of VCOs were harmonically locked to each string but could be tuned separately to play different pitches. The GR-300 also featured a VCF with variable length sweep up and down, and an LFO to add pitch vibrato to the oscillators. Each string had an enable-disable switch as well as a string sensitivity switch (basically audio compression). Built-in footswitches controlled the VCO mode (single/duet), the VCO harmonize pitch (detuning of the VCO's), and the VCF mode (on, bypass, or inverted - inverting the envelope sweep of the cutoff frequency of the VCF). There was also an expression pedal control input for the cutoff frequency of the VCF. It did not have any patch memory, other than the ability to pre-set pitches of the tunable oscillator (which was not locked to the incoming pitch of the guitar controller) with Pitch A/B footswitches - which could be set to latching or momentary. The GR-300 could output either the guitar, the synth, or a mix of the two.

== Notable users ==
- Pat Metheny
- Chuck Hammer
- Robert Fripp
- Andy Summers
- Adrian Belew
- Charly García
- Shawn Lane
- Kazumi Watanabe
- David Byrne
- Jimmy Page
- Pete Townshend
- Trevor Rabin
- Jeff Beck
- Carlos García-Vaso (Of Azul y Negro fame)
