= Pat Metheny Group =

American jazz fusion group (1977–2010)

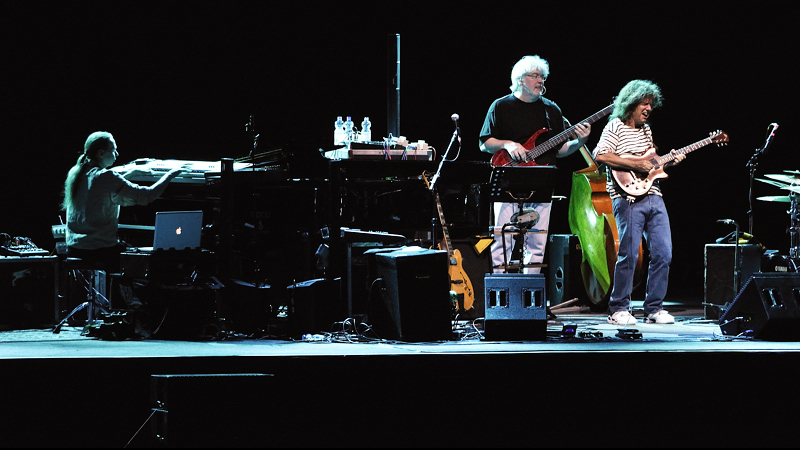
- Pat Metheny Group at Umbria Jazz, July 2010. Lyle Mays (left), Steve Rodby (middle) and Pat Metheny (right)

Background information
- Origin: Lee's Summit, Missouri, United States
- Genres: Jazz; jazz fusion
- Years active: 1977–2010
- Labels: ECM, Geffen, Warner Bros., Nonesuch
- Past members: Pat Metheny; Lyle Mays; Steve Rodby; Danny Gottlieb; Mark Egan; Naná Vasconcelos; Paul Wertico; Pedro Aznar; Antonio Sánchez; David Blamires; Mark Ledford; Armando Marçal; Richard Bona; Luis Conte; Philip Hamilton; Cuong Vu; Grégoire Maret; Nando Lauria; Jeff Haynes
- Website: www.patmetheny.com

The Pat Metheny Group was an American jazz fusion band founded in 1977 by guitarist and composer Pat Metheny, along with his core collaborating partner, pianist, keyboardist and composer Lyle Mays. Other long-standing members included bassist and producer Steve Rodby from 1981 to 2010, and drummer Paul Wertico from 1983 to 2001, after which Antonio Sanchez became the drummer from 2002 to 2010. Vocalist and multi-instrumentalist Pedro Aznar was also a long-time member, performing with the group from 1984 to 1993. In addition to a core quartet, the group was often joined by a variety of other multi-instrumentalists expanding the size to between five and eight musicians.

== History ==
=== 1970s ===
Founder Pat Metheny first emerged on the jazz scene in the mid-1970s with a pair of solo albums. First was Bright Size Life, released in 1976, a trio album with bass guitarist Jaco Pastorius and drummer Bob Moses. The next album, released in 1977, was Watercolors, featuring Eberhard Weber on bass, pianist Lyle Mays, and drummer Danny Gottlieb.

In 1977, bassist Mark Egan joined Metheny, Mays, and Gottlieb to form the Pat Metheny Group. ECM released the album Pat Metheny Group in 1978 with songs co-written by Metheny and Mays. Pat Metheny Group showcased Mays' use of the Oberheim synthesizer, which became an integral part of the group's sound. In 1979, the group's second album, American Garage, reached No. 1 on the jazz chart in Billboard magazine.

=== 1980s ===
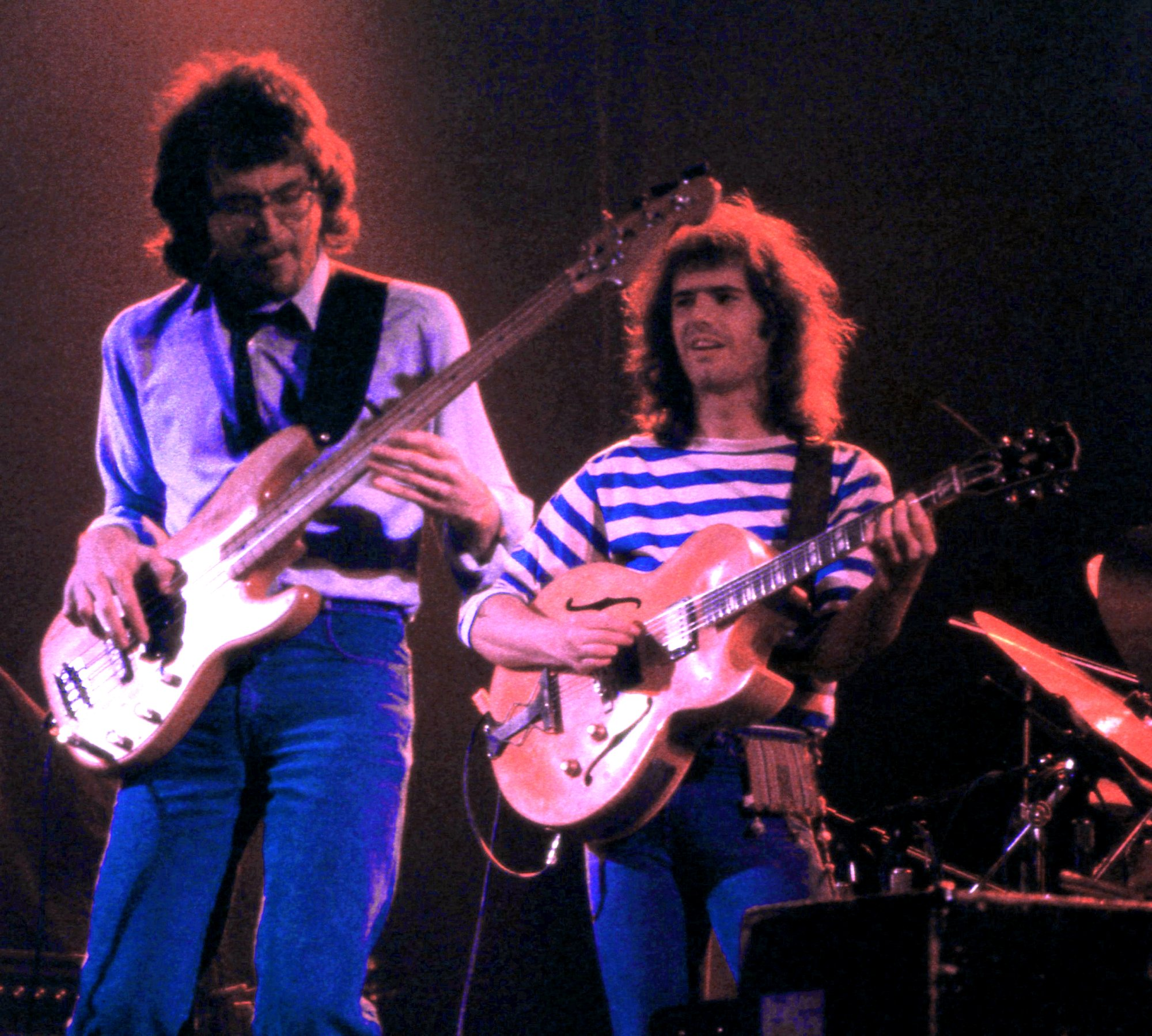
Left to right: Steve Rodby and Pat Metheny

The Pat Metheny Group released the album Offramp in 1982. Offramp marked the first recorded appearance of bassist Steve Rodby in the group (replacing Mark Egan), and also featured Brazilian guest artist Naná Vasconcelos. Vasconcelos had appeared on the Pat Metheny/Lyle Mays album As Falls Wichita, So Falls Wichita Falls in 1981, and his performance on percussion and wordless vocals marked the first addition of Latin-South American music shadings to the Group's sound. Offramp was also the group's first recording to win a Grammy Award, the first win of many for the group.

In 1983, a live album titled Travels was released. It won the Grammy Award for Best Jazz Fusion Performance in 1984, which also brought the release of First Circle, a popular album that featured compositions with mixed or odd meters. With this album, the group featured a new drummer, Paul Wertico (replacing Danny Gottlieb). Wertico and Rodby had both played with the Simon & Bard Group. A soundtrack album The Falcon and the Snowman followed in 1985. It featured the song "This Is Not America", a writing and performing collaboration with David Bowie which reached No. 14 in the UK Top 40 and No. 32 on the US Billboard Hot 100 in early 1985.

The South American influence would continue and intensify on First Circle with the addition of Argentine multi-instrumentalist Pedro Aznar. This period saw the commercial popularity of the band increase, especially thanks to the live recording Travels. First Circle would also be Metheny's last project with the ECM label; Metheny had been a key artist for ECM but left over conceptual disagreements with label founder Manfred Eicher.

The next three Pat Metheny Group releases would be based around a further intensification of the Brazilian rhythms first heard in the early '80s. Additional South American musicians appear as guests, most notably Brazilian percussionist Armando Marçal. The Group's first release on Geffen Records was Still Life (Talking) (1987). The album's first track, "Minuano (Six Eight)", represents a good example of the Pat Metheny group compositional style from this period: the track starts with a haunting minor section showing Mays' compositional influence, yielding to a jubilant major melody more typical of Metheny. A Metheny solo builds into an intricate, composed marimba section followed by a brief, but metrically and harmonically complex interlude, both characteristic of Mays, before finally leading to a reprise of the minimalistic Metheny theme. Another popular track was "Last Train Home", a rhythmically relentless Metheny piece that builds to a single point of release where wordless vocals enter.

The 1989 release Letter from Home continued this approach, with the South American influence becoming even more prevalent in its bossa nova and samba rhythms.

=== 1990s ===
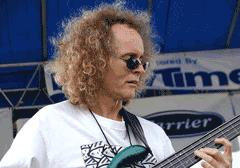
Pat Metheny Group bassist Mark Egan

Metheny subsequently concentrated on solo and other small-group projects, and four years went by before the release of the next Pat Metheny Group album. This was a live set recorded in Europe in 1993 titled The Road to You and it featured tracks from the two Geffen studio albums alongside new tunes. By this stage, the group had integrated new instrumentation and technologies into its sound, including Mays' addition of midi-controlled synthesized sounds to acoustic piano solos, accomplished via a pedal control.

Mays and Metheny refer to the following three Pat Metheny Group releases as the triptych: We Live Here in 1995, Quartet in 1996, and Imaginary Day in 1997. Moving away from the Latin style which had dominated the releases of the previous decade, these albums included hip-hop drum loops, free-form improvisation on acoustic instruments, and symphonic signatures, blues and sonata schemes. On some tunes from this era, the band also experimented with thrash metal, electronica, and folk music from parts of the world unexplored by the band in the past.

=== 2000s ===
After another hiatus, the Pat Metheny Group re-emerged in 2002 with the release Speaking of Now, marking another change in direction through the addition of younger musicians. Joining the core players (Metheny, Mays and Rodby), were drummer Antonio Sanchez from Mexico City, Vietnam-born trumpeter and vocalist Cuong Vu from Seattle, and bassist/vocalist/guitarist/percussionist Richard Bona from Cameroon.

The group's final album, The Way Up, was released on Nonesuch Records in 2005, with Swiss-American harmonica player Grégoire Maret joining the group. Although Bona had left after the 2002 tour to concentrate on his solo career, he returned as one of two guest artists—the other being mallet cymbalist Dave Samuels—for the album.

The Way Up is a long-form recording which consists of a single 68 minute-long piece split into four sections. Metheny said that one of the inspirations for the labyrinthine piece was a reaction against a perceived trend for music requiring a short attention span and which lacks nuance and detail. Many of the textures in The Way Up are created from interlocking guitar lines; Steve Reich is credited on the CD as an inspiration, along with Eberhard Weber. The piece is through-composed, tightly interleaving traditional open improvisation sections with intricate, composed group interplay. During the group's 2005 tour (when its lineup was supplemented by Brazilian multi-instrumentalist Nando Lauria), The Way Up was played in its entirety as the first half of the concert. The final performance of the piece was at a free show for more than a hundred thousand people at the close of the 2005 Montreal Jazz Festival.

The Pat Metheny Group played at the Blue Note Tokyo and Blue Note Nagoya in December 2008 and January 2009 in its core quartet of Lyle Mays, Steve Rodby and Antonio Sanchez. This quartet version of the group later toured the jazz festivals of Europe in the summer of 2010 for their "Songbook Tour". These concerts featured music from all eras of the group but no new material.

== Members ==
=== Past members ===
- Pat Metheny – acoustic and electric guitars, guitar synthesizer (1977–2010)
- Lyle Mays – piano, synthesizers (1977–2010)
- Mark Egan – fretless bass, bass guitar (1977–1980)
- Danny Gottlieb – drums (1977–1982)
- Naná Vasconcelos – percussion, vocals (1980–1982, 1986)
- Steve Rodby – double bass, bass guitar, cello (1981–2010)
- Paul Wertico – drums (1983–2001)
- Pedro Aznar – vocals, percussion, melodica, guitars, tenor saxophone (1983–1985, 1989–1991, 1992)
- David Blamires – vocals, guitar, trumpet, mellophone, violin, recorder (1986–1988, 1992, 1994–1997)
- Armando Marçal – percussion, vocals (1987–1992, 1995–1996)
- Mark Ledford – vocals, guitar, trumpet, flugelhorn, whistling (1987–1988, 1992, 1994–1998)
- Nando Lauria – guitars, vocals, percussion (1988, 2005)
- Luis Conte – percussion (1994–1995)
- Philip Hamilton – vocals, miscellaneous (1997–1998)
- Jeff Haynes – percussion (1997–1998)
- Antonio Sánchez – drums, percussion (2001–2010)
- Richard Bona – vocals, acoustic guitar, electric bass, percussion (2001–2004)
- Cuong Vu – trumpet, vocals, whistle (2001–2005)
- Grégoire Maret – harmonica (2003–2005)

=== Timeline ===
* This timeline reflects active members of the band, at either times they recorded or times they toured with the band. Members may have left the band by the time albums they performed on were released. Minor contributors to albums who did not tour with the band are not included.

== Discography ==
=== Studio albums ===
Title	Released	Label	Formats	Peak chart positions "—" indicates not released or did not chart in the region									Certifications
Title	Released	Label	Formats	UK	FRA	JPN	US	GER	SWE	ITA	POL	NLD	Certifications
Pat Metheny Group	January, 1978	ECM	CD, LP, digital download	—	—	—	123	—	—	—	—	—	
American Garage	1979	ECM	CD, LP, digital download	—	—	—	53	—	—	—	—	—	
Offramp	1982	ECM	CD, LP, digital download	—	—	—	50	—	—	—	—	—	
First Circle	1984	ECM	CD, LP, digital download	—	—	—	102	—	—	—	—	—	
Still Life (Talking)	1987	Geffen	CD, LP, digital download	—	—	—	86	—	—	—	—	—	US: Gold
Letter from Home	1989	Geffen	CD, LP, digital download	—	—	—	66	—	—	—	—	—	US: Gold
We Live Here	1995	Geffen	CD, digital download	102	—	45	83	—	23	—	—	—	
Quartet	1996	Geffen	CD, digital download	121	—	70	187	—	—	—	—	—	
Imaginary Day	October 7, 1997	Warner Bros.	CD, DVD-A, digital download	104	—	51	124	59	—	—	—	—	POL: Gold
Speaking of Now	February 12, 2002	Warner Bros.	CD, digital download	134	72	45	101	24	51	9	2	—	POL: Platinum
The Way Up	January 25, 2005	Nonesuch	CD, digital download	117	61	34	99	29	40	11	1	68	POL: Gold

=== Live albums ===
Title	Album details	Peak chart positions
Title	Album details	US
Travels	Released: 1983; Label: ECM; Formats: CD, LP, digital download	62
The Road to You	Released: 1993; Label: Geffen Records; Formats: CD, LP, digital download	170
"—" denotes a recording that did not chart or was not released in that territory.

=== Compilation albums ===
Date of release	Title	Comment
2015	Essential Collection Last Train Home	

=== Soundtracks ===
Title	Album details	Peak chart positions		
Title	Album details	GER	US	NLD
The Falcon and the Snowman	Released: 1985; Label: EMI; Formats: CD, LP, digital download	44	54	46
"—" denotes a recording that did not chart or was not released in that territory.

== Awards and nominations ==
Grammy Awards
Year	Category	Nominated work	Note
1983	Grammy Award for Best Jazz Fusion Performance	Offramp	Won
1984	Grammy Award for Best Jazz Fusion Performance	Travels	Won
1985	Grammy Award for Best Jazz Fusion Performance	First Circle	Won
1988	Grammy Award for Best Jazz Fusion Performance	Still Life (Talking)	Won
1990	Grammy Award for Best Jazz Fusion Performance	Letter from Home	Won
1994	Grammy Award for Best Contemporary Jazz Album	The Road to You	Won
1996	Grammy Award for Best Contemporary Jazz Album	We Live Here	Won
1999	Grammy Award for Best Rock Instrumental Performance	"The Roots of Coincidence"	Won
1999	Grammy Award for Best Contemporary Jazz Album	Imaginary Day	Won
2003	Grammy Award for Best Contemporary Jazz Album	Speaking of Now	Won
2006	Grammy Award for Best Contemporary Jazz Album	The Way Up	Won
