= Pat Metheny discography =

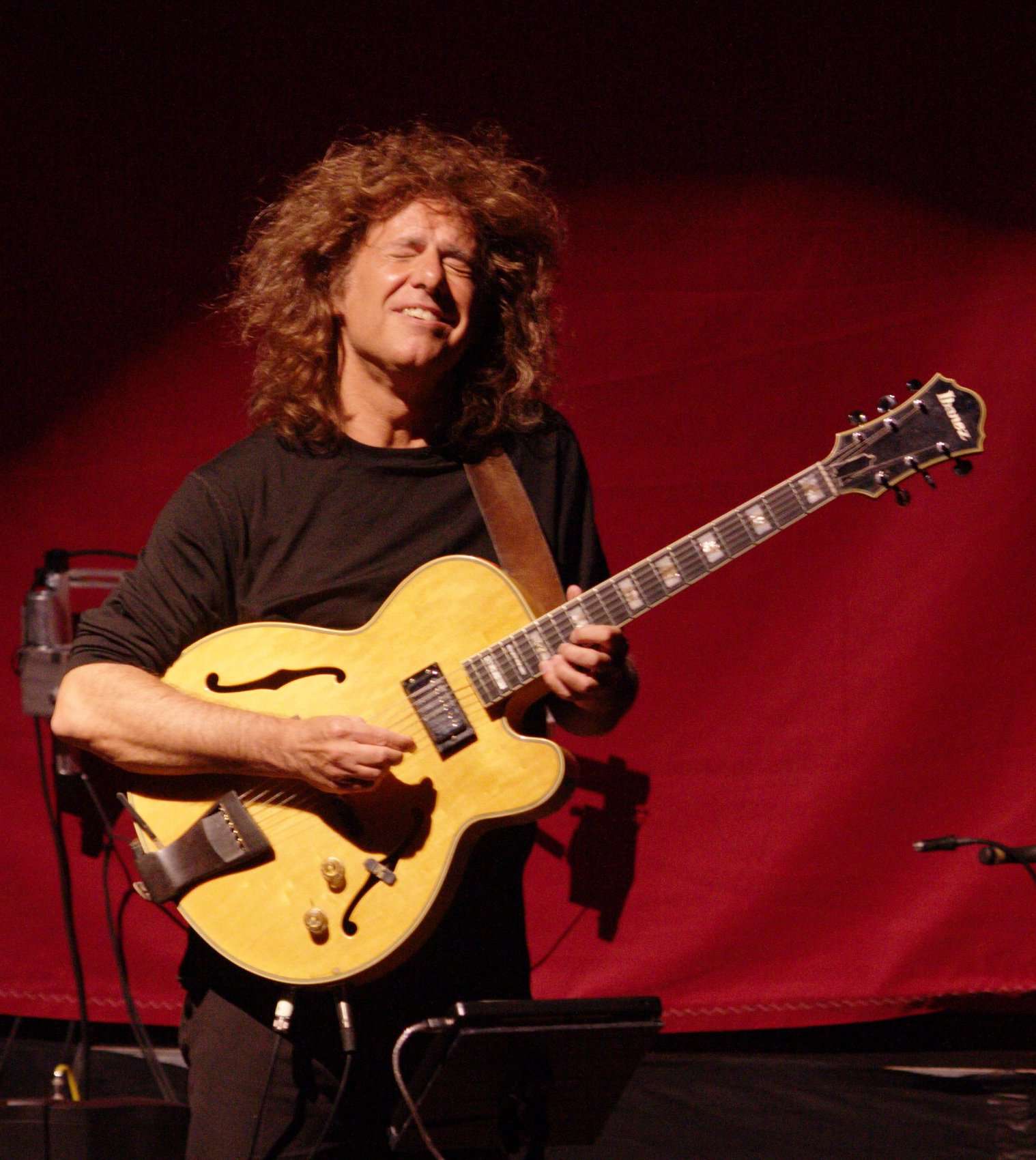
Pat Metheny, 2010

This is a discography of works by Pat Metheny.

== Studio albums ==
Title	Album details	Peak chart positions											Certifications
Title	Album details	UK	US	US Jazz	FRA	GER	JPN	SWI	NLD	BEL (FL)	BEL (WA)	POL	Certifications
Bright Size Life	Released: March 1,1976; Label: ECM; Formats: CD, digital download	—	—	28	—	—	—	—	—	—	—	—	
Watercolors	Released: June 1977; Label: ECM; Formats: CD, digital download	—	—	28	—	—	—	—	—	—	—	—	
New Chautauqua	Released: April 1979; Label: ECM; Formats: CD, digital download	—	44	3	—	—	—	—	—	—	—	—	
80/81	Released: September 1, 1980; Label: ECM; Formats: CD, digital download	—	—	—	—	—	—	—	—	—	—	—	
Secret Story	Released: July 1992; Label: Geffen; Formats: CD, digital download	—	110	—	—	—	—	—	—	—	—	—	US: Gold
Zero Tolerance for Silence	Released: 1994; Label: Geffen; Formats: CD	—	—	—	—	—	—	—	—	—	—	—	
One Quiet Night	Released: May 13, 2003; Label: Warner Bros.; Formats: CD, digital download	146	167	1	119	74	77	—	—	—	—	7	
Orchestrion	Released: January 26, 2010; Label: Nonesuch; Formats: CD, digital download	176	114	3	77	64	77	83	45	90	81	19	POL: Gold
What's It All About	Released: June 14, 2011; Label: Nonesuch; Formats: CD, digital download	164	125	1	153	53	48	80	—	—	81	11	POL: Gold
From This Place	Released: February 21, 2020; Label: Nonesuch; Formats: CD, digital download, vinyl	90	92	—	—	11	30	12	32	124	61	11	
Road to the Sun	Released: March 5, 2021; Label: Metheny Group, BMG; Formats: CD, digital download, vinyl	—	—	—	—	10	—	17	—	184	—	21	
Dream Box	Released: June 16, 2023; Label: Metheny Group, BMG; Formats: CD, digital download, vinyl	—	—	—	—	—	—	—	—	—	—	—	
MoonDial	Released: July 26, 2024; Label: Metheny Group, BMG; Formats: CD, digital download, vinyl	—	—	—	—	54	—	48	—	177	—	—	
Side-Eye III+	Released: February 26, 2026; Label: Uniquity Music; Formats: CD, digital download, vinyl	—	—	—	—	—	—	—	—	—	—	—	
"—" denotes a recording that did not chart or was not released in that territory.

== Live albums ==
Title	Album details	Peak chart positions
Title	Album details	US Jazz
Flower Hour	Released: 1992; Label: Beech Master Records; Format: CD	—
The Orchestrion Project	Released: February 11, 2013; Label: Nonesuch; Formats: CD, digital download	7
Hommage à Eberhard Weber	Released: September 11, 2015; Label: ECM; Format: CD, digital download	—
The Unity Sessions	Released: May 6, 2016; Label: Nonesuch; Format: CD, digital download	—
Side-Eye NYC (V1.IV)	Released: September 10, 2021; Label: Modern Recordings; Format: CD, LP, digital download	—
"—" denotes a recording that did not chart or was not released in that territory.

== Soundtracks ==
Title	Album details	Peak chart positions			
Title	Album details	US Cont Jazz	GER	US	NLD
The Falcon and the Snowman	Released: February 22, 1985; Label: EMI; Formats: CD, LP, digital download	—	44	54	46
Passaggio per il paradiso	Released: 1996; Label: MCA; Formats: CD	—	—	—	—
A Map of the World	Released: November 9, 1999; Label: Warner Bros; Formats: CD, digital download	7	—	—	—
"—" denotes a recording that did not chart or was not released in that territory.

== Compilation albums ==
Title	Album details
Works	Released: 1984; Label: ECM; Formats: CD, digital download
Works II	Released: 1988; Label: ECM; Formats: CD, digital download
Selected Recordings: rarum IX	Released: February 10, 2004; Label: ECM; Formats: CD
Essential Collection Last Train Home	Released: January 17, 2015; Label: Nonesuch; Formats: CD, digital download

== Other albums ==
Title	Album details	Peak chart positions			
Title	Album details	US Jazz	FRA	BEL (FL)	BEL (WA)
Tap: John Zorn's Book of Angels, Vol. 20	Released: May 20, 2013; Label: Nonesuch; Formats: CD, digital download	2	177	141	144

== Pat Metheny Group ==
Title	Album details	Peak chart positions									Certifications
Title	Album details	UK	FRA	JPN	US	GER	SWE	ITA	POL	NLD	Certifications
Pat Metheny Group	Released: January, 1978; Label: ECM; Formats: CD, LP, digital download	—	—	—	123	—	—	—	—	—	
American Garage	Released: 1979; Label: ECM; Formats: CD, LP, digital download	—	—	—	53	—	—	—	—	—	
Offramp	Released: 1982; Label: ECM; Formats: CD, LP, digital download	—	—	—	50	—	—	—	—	—	
Travels (live)	Released: 1983; Label: ECM; Formats: CD, LP, digital download	—	—	—	62	—	—	—	—	—	
First Circle	Released: 1984; Label: ECM; Formats: CD, LP, digital download	—	—	—	102	—	—	—	—	—	
Still Life (Talking)	Released: 1987; Label: Geffen Records; Formats: CD, LP, digital download	—	—	—	86	—	—	—	—	—	US: Gold
Letter from Home	Released: 1989; Label: Geffen Records; Formats: CD, LP, digital download	—	—	—	66	—	—	—	—	—	US: Gold
The Road to You (live)	Released 1993; Label: Geffen Records; Formats: CD, LP, digital download	—	—	—	170	—	—	—	—	—	
We Live Here	Released: 1995; Label: Geffen Records; Formats: CD, digital download	102	—	45	83	—	23	—	—	—	
Quartet	Released: 1996; Label: Geffen Records; Formats: CD, digital download	121	—	70	187	—	—	—	—	—	
Imaginary Day	Released: October 7, 1997; Label: Warner Bros. Records; Formats: CD, DVD-A, digital download	104	—	51	124	59	—	—	—	—	POL: Gold
Speaking of Now	Released: February 12, 2002; Label: Warner Bros. Records; Formats: CD, digital download	134	72	45	101	24	51	9	2	—	POL: Platinum
The Way Up	Released: January 25, 2005; Label: Nonesuch Records; Formats: CD, digital download	117	61	34	99	29	40	11	1	68	POL: Gold
"—" denotes a recording that did not chart or was not released in that territory.

== Pat Metheny Unity Band ==
Title	Album details	Peak chart positions								
Title	Album details	UK	US	US Jazz	FRA	GER	NLD	AUT	NOR	POL
Unity Band with Chris Potter, Ben Williams, and Antonio Sánchez	Released: June 12, 2012; Label: Nonesuch; Formats: CD, digital download	189	146	2	171	65	69	75	36	22

== Pat Metheny Unity Group ==
Title	Album details	Peak chart positions								
Title	Album details	UK	US	US Jazz	JPN	FRA	NLD	ITA	GER	POL
KIN (←→)	Released: February 3, 2014; Label: Nonesuch; Formats: CD, digital download	123	50	1	23	161	65	14	64	21

== Pat Metheny Trio ==
Title	Album details	Peak chart positions
Title	Album details	US Top Jazz
Trio 99 → 00	Released: February 8, 2000; Label: Warner Bros; Formats: CD, digital download	2
Trio → Live	Released: November 21, 2000; Label: Warner Bros; Formats: CD, digital download	3

== Collaborations ==
=== With Brad Mehldau ===
Title	Album details	Peak chart positions						
Title	Album details	US Jazz	JPN	FRA	NLD	ITA	GER	POL
Metheny Mehldau	Released: September 12, 2006; Label: Nonesuch; Formats: CD, digital download	3	44	60	96	10	98	11
Metheny Mehldau Quartet	Released: March 13, 2007; Label: Nonesuch; Formats: CD, digital download	2	75	124	—	—	—	—
"—" denotes a recording that did not chart or was not released in that territory.

=== Duets ===
Title	Album details	Peak chart positions				Certifications
Title	Album details	US	US Jazz	SWE	POL	Certifications
As Falls Wichita, So Falls Wichita Falls with Lyle Mays	Released: May 1981; Label: ECM; Formats: CD, digital download	50	1	—	—	
Song X with Ornette Coleman	Released: June 1986; Label: Geffen; Formats: CD, digital download	—	9	—	—	
I Can See Your House from Here with John Scofield	Released: April 5, 1994; Label: Blue Note; Formats: CD, digital download	181	1	—	—	
Beyond the Missouri Sky (Short Stories) with Charlie Haden	Released: February 25, 1997; Label: Verve; Formats: CD, digital download	—	1	42	—	POL: Gold
Jim Hall & Pat Metheny with Jim Hall	Released: April 27, 1999; Label: Telarc; Formats: CD, digital download	—	2	—	—	
Upojenie with Anna Maria Jopek	Released: December 1, 2002; Label: Warner Poland Music; Formats: CD, digital download	—	—	—	1	POL: Platinum
"—" denotes a recording that did not chart or was not released in that territory.

=== Trios ===
Title	Album details	Peak chart positions								
Title	Album details	US	US Jazz	US Cont Jazz	JPN	UK	FRA	ITA	GER	POL
Rejoicing with Charlie Haden and Billy Higgins	Released: 1984; Label: ECM; Formats: CD, digital download	116	4	—	—	—	—	—	—	—
Question and Answer with Dave Holland and Roy Haynes	Released: 1990; Label: Geffen; Formats: CD, digital download	154	3	—	—	—	—	—	—	—
Day Trip with Antonio Sánchez and Christian McBride	Released: January 29, 2008; Label: Nonesuch; Formats: CD, digital download	—	—	1	45	197	73	18	68	16
Tokyo Day Trip with Antonio Sánchez and Christian McBride	Released: May 20, 2008; Label: Nonesuch; Formats: CD, digital download	—	—	6	135	—	—	—	—	—
"—" denotes a recording that did not chart or was not released in that territory.

=== Quartets ===
Title	Album details
Jaco with Jaco Pastorius, Paul Bley, and Bruce Ditmas	Released: 1974; Label: Improvising Artists; Formats: CD
The Sign of 4 with Derek Bailey, Gregg Bendian, and Paul Wertico	Released: 1997; Label: Knitting Factory Works; Formats: CD

=== With The Heath Brothers ===
Title	Album details
All The Things You Are with The Heath Brothers, Gary Burton, Ahmad Jamal, and Trio Hum	Released: 1999; Label: Fruit Tree; Formats: CD
Move to the Groove with The Heath Brothers	Released: 2000; Label: West Wind; Formats: CD
A Sassy Samba with The Heath Brothers	Released: 2000; Label: Past Perfect/Silver Line; Formats: CD
Parallel Universe with The Heath Brothers	Released: 2001; Label: TKO Magnum Music; Formats: CD
Luminescence: Kool Jazz At Midem with The Heath Brothers, Dave Brubeck, Bill Smith, and B.B. King Orchestra	Released: 2001; Label: TKO Magnum Meteor, U.K.; Formats: CD

=== Gary Burton projects ===
Title	Album details	Peak chart positions		
Title	Album details	US Jazz	US Top Jazz	JPN
Ring (Gary Burton Quintet with Eberhard Weber)	Released: 1974; Label: ECM; Formats: CD, digital download	—	—	—
Dreams So Real – Music of Carla Bley (Gary Burton Quintet)	Released: 1976; Label: ECM; Formats: CD, digital download	25	—	—
Passengers (Gary Burton Quartet with Eberhard Weber)	Released: 1977; Label: ECM; Formats: CD, digital download	25	—	—
Reunion with Pat Metheny, Mitchel Forman, Will Lee, and Peter Erskine	Released: 1990; Label: GRP; Formats: CD, digital download	1	—	—
Like Minds with Chick Corea, Pat Metheny, Dave Holland, and Roy Haynes	Released: November 3, 1998; Label: Concord Jazz; Formats: CD, digital download	—	5	—
Quartet Live with Pat Metheny, Steve Swallow, and Antonio Sánchez	Released: May 26, 2009; Label: Concord Jazz; Formats: CD, digital download	—	4	100
"—" denotes a recording that did not chart or was not released in that territory.

== Appearances ==
Title	Year	Notes
Shadows and Light	1980	Joni Mitchell album with Lyle Mays, Jaco Pastorius, Michael Brecker, and Don Alias
The Song Is You	1981	Chick Corea album with Anthony Braxton, Lee Konitz, Miroslav Vitous, and Jack DeJohnette
Day In – Night Out	1986	Mike Metheny album with Dick Odgren, Rufus Reid, and Tommy Ruskin
Michael Brecker	1987	Michael Brecker album with Kenny Kirkland, Charlie Haden, and Jack DeJohnette
Electric Counterpoint	1989	Steve Reich album with Kronos Quartet
Parallel Realities	1990	Jack DeJohnette album with Herbie Hancock
Till We Have Faces	1992	Gary Thomas album with Tim Murphy, Anthony Cox, Ed Howard, Steve Moss, and Terri Lyne Carrington
Wish	1993	Joshua Redman album with Charlie Haden and Billy Higgins
Parallel Realities Live...	1993	Jack DeJohnette album with Herbie Hancock and Dave Holland
Fictionary	1993	Lyle Mays album with Marc Johnson and Jack DeJohnette
Noa	1994	Achinoam Nini album with Gil Goldstein, Lyle Mays, Rob Eaton, Gil Dor, Steve Rodby, Steve Ferrone, Luis Conte, Dave Samuels, Bill Evans, and Danny Gottlieb
Dream Teams	1994	Sonny Rollins album with Alphonso Johnson and Jack Dejohnette Disc: 2 Charlie Haden album with Billy Higgins
Te Vou!	1994	Roy Haynes album with David Kikoski, Christian McBride, and Donald Harrison
Blues for Pat: Live In San Francisco	1995	The Joshua Redman Quartet album with Christian McBride and Billy Higgins
Pursuance	1996	Kenny Garrett album with Rodney Whitaker and Brian Blade
Tales from the Hudson	1996	Michael Brecker album with Joey Calderazzo, McCoy Tyner, Dave Holland, Don Alias, and Jack DeJohnette
Wilderness	1996	Tony Williams album with Michael Brecker, Stanley Clarke, and Herbie Hancock
The Sound of Summer Running	1998	Marc Johnson album with Bill Frisell and Joey Baron
The Elements: Water	1998	Dave Liebman album with Cecil McBee and Billy Hart
Time Is of the Essence	1999	Michael Brecker album with Larry Goldings, Bill Stewart, Elvin Jones, and Jeff "Tain" Watts
Nearness of You: The Ballad Book	2001	Michael Brecker album with Herbie Hancock, Charlie Haden, James Taylor, and Jack DeJohnette
Portrait of Jaco: The Early Years, 1968-1978	2003	Interview and live performance with Jaco Pastorius (b) and Bob Moses (dr)
Live at the Jazz Baltica 2003	2003	Esbjörn Svensson Trio album with Schleswig-Holstein Chamber Orchestra
The Montreal Tapes (With Pat Metheny & Jack DeJohnette)	2007	Charlie Haden album with Jack DeJohnette
Pilgrimage	2007	Michael Brecker album with Brad Mehldau, Herbie Hancock, John Patitucci, and Jack DeJohnette
Shift	2016	Logan Richardson album with Jason Moran, Harish Raghavan, and Nasheet Waits
Cuong Vu Trio Meets Pat Metheny	2016	Cuong Vu album with Stomu Takeishi and Ted Poor

=== Other ===
As sideman	Year	Album
"Prato Feito" ("Today's Special"), "Manuel o Audaz" ("Manuel the Brave")	1980	Toninho Horta – Toninho Horta
"Mutação" ("Mutation")	1981	Celia Vaz – Mutação
"That Summer Something"	1981	Ross-Levine Band – That Summer something
n/a (guest soloist)	1983	Jerry Goldsmith – Under Fire – Original Motion Picture Soundtrack
"Vidro e Corte" ("Glass and Cut")	1985	Milton Nascimento – Encontros e Despedidas
"Verano en Nueva Inglaterra", "23"	1985	Pedro Aznar – Contemplación
"Overtue Go Down Moses", "Song of Moses"	1986	Bob Moses – The Story of Moses
"Terra Azul" ("Blue Earth")	1988	Ricardo Silveira – Long Distance
"Summertime"	1988	Mark Ledford – Miles 2 Go
"Moonstone"	1989	Toninho Horta – Moonstone
"Depois da Paixão" ("After the Passion")	1989	Túlio Mourão – Teia de Renda
"O Fundo" ("The Background")	1989	Leila Pinheiro – Olho Nu
"It's for You", "How Beautiful", "Watching You"	1989	Akiko Yano – Welcome Back
"Tell Me Where You're Going"	1990	Silje Nergaard – Tell Me Where You're Going
"Liko Liko (Good Girl)", "Ai Wa Tacusan (Lots of Love)", "Love Life"	1991	Akiko Yano – Love Life
"Let Joy and Innocence Prevail"	1992	Toys: Music from the Original Motion Picture Soundtrack
"Third Stone from the Sun"	1993	Stone Free: A Tribute to Jimi Hendrix
"Harbor Lights", "Talk of the Town", "China Doll" and "The Tide Will Rise"	1993	Bruce Hornsby – Harbor Lights
"Don't Look Back"	1993	Paul Wertico – The Yin and the Yout
"Vera Cruz", "Novena", "Amor Amigo" ("Friend Love")	1994	Milton Nascimento – Angelus
"Manini", "Crazy Saints"	1994	Trilok Gurtu – Crazy Saints
"The Eternal Triangle", "How Insensitive"	1994	The Carnegie Hall Salutes the Jazz Masters
"White Wheeled Limousine", "Walk in the Sun", "The Changes", "Country Doctor" and "The Longest Night"	1995	Bruce Hornsby – Hot House
"Throw It Away", "Avec le temps", "Should've Been", "Being Me",	1995	Abbey Lincoln – A Turtle's Dream
"I'm So Lonesome I Could Cry", "Brooklyn Bridge"	1997	Akiko Yano – Oui Oui
"Django"	1998	Jim Hall – By Arrangement
"Sky and Sea (Blue in Green)"	1999	Cassandra Wilson – Traveling Miles
"Sounds Like Winter", "Simply Said"	1999	Kenny Garrett – Simply Said
"Something to Remind You"	1999	Philip Bailey – Dreams
"Reverence (The Story of a Miracle)"	2001	Richard Bona – Reverence
"Noche de ronda (Night of Wandering)"	2001	Charlie Haden – Nocturne
"Ta Ta for Now"	2001	Mike Metheny – Close Enough for Love
"Cantaloupe Island"	2002	Milton Nascimento – Pieta
"Generalife", "Donde habite el olvido"	2005	Enrique Morente – Morente sueña la Alhambra
"Never Was Love"	2005	Russ Long, Gerald Spaits, Ray Demarchi – Time to Go
"Shirk", "Article 3"	2005	Meshell Ndegeocello – The World Has Made Me the Man of My Dreams
"Arena (Sand)", "Solar"	2007	Antonio Sanchez – Migration
"Is This America? (Katrina 2005)"	2008	Charlie Haden Family & Friends – Rambling Boy
"Ballad for E"	2011	Magnus Öström – Thread of Life
"Ψεύτικα"	2011	Χάρης Βαρθακούρης – Άρχοντας Του Κόσμου
"Find Me in Your Dreams (en tus sueños)"	2012	Estrella Morente – Autorretrato
"Nicaragua"	2012	Django Unchained – The Original Motion Picture Soundtrack
"No lo sé"	2013	Concha Buika – La noche más larga
"Gratitude"	2013	Will Lee – Love, Gratitude and Other Distractions
"Ankara", "Of All People"	2013	Michiel Borstlap – North Sea Jazz Legendary Concerts
"Eternity and Beauty (For Pat)"	2014	Achinoam Nini (Noa) – Love Medicine
"Saludos/Come Thou Almighty King"	2014	Jimmy Greene – Beautiful Life
"Eh Hee 2.0"	2022	Antonio Sanchez – SHIFT (Bad Hombre Vol. II)
"Lujon (Slow Hot Wind)"	2024	Henry Mancini – 100th Sessions Henry Has Company
