= The Sound of Summer Running =

Studio album by Marc Johnson
- Released: February 24, 1998
- Recorded: 1997
- Studio: Avatar, New York City
- Genre: Jazz
- Length: 53:14
- Label: Verve
- Producer: Lee Townsend

Marc Johnson chronology
Magic Labyrinth (1995)	The Sound of Summer Running (1998)	If Trees Could Fly (1998)

The Sound of Summer Running is a 1998 studio album by jazz bassist Marc Johnson released by Verve Records. It features an all-star Quartet with guitarists Pat Metheny and Bill Frisell, and John Zorn's frequent drummer Joey Baron. The title was borrowed from a story by Ray Bradbury.

== Reception ==
Scott Yanow, writing for AllMusic, awarded the album three stars out of five, stating:

This date is a surprisingly mellow and melodic affair, particularly when one considers the personnel (bassist Marc Johnson, both Bill Frisell and Pat Metheny on guitars and drummer Joey Baron). Much of the music is comprised of unclassifiable, folkish melodies filled with lyrical guitar solos. Frisell is quite restrained throughout (adding a country feel to many of the songs) and Metheny is less distinctive than usual, alternating between his electric and acoustic guitars, as well as his 42-string Pikasso guitar. The quartet performs seven Johnson originals (most memorable is "Union Pacific"), two by Frisell and one from Metheny. The overall results are pleasing and relaxed music that falls a little bit short of being the classic date one might expect; more fire was needed.

JazzTimes critic Bill Milkowski, in his review of the album wrote: "... Johnson’s Verve debut is bound to send ripples of excitement through the guitar community. “Put Frisell with just about anybody and you’re going to create something exciting,” says Johnson... Ross Porter in his book The Essential Jazz Recordings: 101 CDs praised Johnson's performance, commenting, "On The Sound of Summer Running Marc Johnson has created both a showcase for his own and others' virtuosity. He plays with warmth and poignancy, and like all great bass players knows his place, never getting in the way. Johnson has made a great record, one that is very satysfying to listen to." The Buffalo News review by Jeff Simon noted, "Irresistible -- a sunbath of a disc by the great bassist that somehow managed to pair guitarists Bill Frisell and Pat Metheny in music virtually impossible to dislike... It's the sort of jazz that has hit potential without compromising all integrity. Summery charm, after all, is the whole point of the disc."

Professional ratings
Review scores
Source	Rating
AllMusic	3/5 stars
The Buffalo News	3.5/4 stars
Entertainment Weekly	B−
The Penguin Guide to Jazz on CD	4/4 stars
Tom Hull	A−
The Virgin Encyclopedia of Jazz	4/5 stars

== Track listing ==
No.	Title	Writer(s)	Length
1.	"Faith in You"	Johnson	5:53
2.	"Ghost Town"	Bill Frisell	5:35
3.	"Summer Running"	Johnson	5:56
4.	"With My Boots On"	Johnson	4:25
5.	"Union Pacific"	Johnson	5:29
6.	"Porch Swing"	Johnson	4:12
7.	"Dingy-Dong Day"	Johnson	3:51
8.	"The Adventures of Max and Ben"	Bill Frisell	6:08
9.	"In a Quiet Place"	Eliane Elias, Johnson	5:17
10.	"For a Thousand Years"	Pat Metheny	6:28
Total length:			53:14

== Personnel ==
- Marc Johnson – double bass
- Bill Frisell – electric and acoustic guitars
- Pat Metheny – electric and acoustic guitars, 42-string Pikasso guitar
- Joey Baron – drums, tambourine

Production

- Joe Ferla – engineer
- Greg Calbi – mastering
- Lee Townsend – producer

== Notes ==
- Recorded at Avatar Studios, New York City
- Mixed at Sony Music Studios, New York City
- Mastered at Masterdisk, New York City
