= Flower Hour =

Live album by Pat Metheny
- Released: 1992
- Recorded: June 23, 1990
- Venue: Mellon Jazz Festival, Philadelphia, Pennsylvania
- Genre: Jazz
- Length: 96:44
- Label: Beech Master
- Producer: Pat Metheny

Pat Metheny chronology
Secret Story (1992)	Flower Hour (1992)	Zero Tolerance for Silence (1994)

Flower Hour, also released as Parallel Realities Live (1993) and Live in Concert (2001), is a bootleg album by Pat Metheny released in 1992.

== Track listing ==
Disc one:
No.	Title	Writer(s)	Length
1.	"Shadow Dance"	Dave Holland	15:35
2.	"Indigo Dreamscapes"	Jack DeJohnette	7:04
3.	"9 Over Reggae"	Jack DeJohnette, Pat Metheny	7:45
4.	"Solar"	Miles Davis	13:00
5.	"Silver Hollow"	Jack DeJohnette	8:24

Disc two:
No.	Title	Writer(s)	Length
1.	"The Good Life"	Ornette Coleman	6:15
2.	"Blue"	Jack DeJohnette	7:02
3.	"Eye of the Hurricane"	Herbie Hancock	15:30
4.	"The Bat"	Pat Metheny	8:25
5.	"Cantaloupe Island"	Herbie Hancock	9:44

== Personnel ==
- Pat Metheny – acoustic and electric guitars, guitar synthesizer
- Herbie Hancock – piano, keyboards
- Dave Holland – acoustic and electric bass
- Jack DeJohnette – Drums
