= Imaginary Day =

Studio album by Pat Metheny Group
- Released: October 7, 1997
- Recorded: Spring 1997
- Studios: Right Track, New York City
- Genre: Jazz fusion
- Length: 63:49
- Label: Warner Bros.
- Producers: Pat Metheny, Lyle Mays, Steve Rodby

Pat Metheny chronology
Beyond the Missouri Sky (Short Stories) (1997)	Imaginary Day (1997)	Like Minds (1998)

Professional ratings
Review scores
Source	Rating
AllMusic	4/5 stars
The Encyclopedia of Popular Music	4/5 stars
The Penguin Guide to Jazz Recordings	3/4 stars
Tom Hull	B−

Imaginary Day is the ninth studio album by the Pat Metheny Group. It was released in 1997 by Warner Bros. Records. The album was strongly inspired by world music from Iran and Indonesia, and won the 1999 Grammy Award for Best Contemporary Jazz Album. The song "The Roots of Coincidence" won a Grammy Award for Best Rock Instrumental Performance; critic Richard Ginnell of AllMusic described the song as a dramatic departure for the group: "[an] out-and-out rock piece with thrash metal and techno-pop episodes joined by abrupt jump cuts."

The album cover design by Stefan Sagmeister uses a simple pictographic substitution cipher for the name of the group and the title of the album.

Official DVD recorded live at the Mountain Winery, Saratoga, California, US in July 1998, released in 2001.

This album was also made available on DVD-Audio 5.1 multichannel, surround sound.

== History ==
This album marks the final appearance of longtime drummer Paul Wertico, who would leave in 2001 before the recording of Speaking of Now to work on other projects.

== Track listing ==
All tracks are written by Pat Metheny and Lyle Mays except where noted:

No.	Title	Writer(s)	Length
1.	"Imaginary Day"		10:11
2.	"Follow Me"		5:56
3.	"Into the Dream"	Metheny	2:27
4.	"A Story Within the Story"		8:01
5.	"The Heat of the Day"		9:44
6.	"Across the Sky" ("Across the Sky" lasts for 4:46; hidden intro for "The Roots of Coincidence" directly follows)		5:13
7.	"The Roots of Coincidence"		7:48
8.	"Too Soon Tomorrow"	Metheny	5:45
9.	"The Awakening"		9:28

== Personnel ==
- Pat Metheny – acoustic and electric guitars, guitar synthesizer, 42-string Pikasso guitar
- Lyle Mays – piano, keyboards
- Steve Rodby – acoustic and electric bass, cello
- Paul Wertico – drums
- David Blamires – vocals, electric guitar, baritone acoustic guitar, trumpet, mellophone, violin, recorder
- Mark Ledford – vocals, trumpet, flugelhorn, bass trumpet
- Dave Samuels – percussion
- Glen Velez – percussion
- Don Alias – percussion
- Mino Cinélu – percussion

=== Production ===
- Pat Metheny – producer
- Lyle Mays, Steve Rodby – co-producers
- David Oakes, Rob Eaton – associate producer
- Rob Eaton – recording, mixing
- Ted Jensen – mastering at Sterling Sound, New York City, US
- Sagmeister inc. – design
- Latifa Azhar – photography

== Certifications ==
Region	Certification	Certified units/sales
Poland (ZPAV)	Gold	50,000^{*}
^{*} Sales figures based on certification alone.

== Awards ==
Grammy Awards

Years	Winner	Title	Category
1999	Pat Metheny Group	"Imaginary Day"	Grammy Award for Best Contemporary Jazz Album
1999	Pat Metheny Group	"The Roots of Coincidence"	Grammy Award for Best Rock Instrumental Performance

== See also ==
- Pikasso guitar
