= A Map of the World (album) =

Soundtrack album by Pat Metheny
- Released: November 9, 1999
- Recorded: February 1999
- Studios: Right Track, New York City
- Genres: Jazz fusion, folk jazz
- Length: 66:26
- Label: Warner Bros.
- Producers: Pat Metheny, Steve Rodby

Pat Metheny chronology
Jim Hall & Pat Metheny (1999)	A Map of the World (1999)	Trio 99 – 00 (2000)

Professional ratings
Review scores
Source	Rating
Allmusic	4/5 stars
Encyclopedia of Popular Music	5/5 stars
The Penguin Guide to Jazz Recordings	3/4 stars

A Map of the World is a 1999 album by Pat Metheny. It is the soundtrack of the movie A Map of the World released in 1999 starring Sigourney Weaver. The movie was based on the novel A Map of the World by Jane Hamilton.

== Track listing ==
All music composed and arranged by Pat Metheny

No.	Title	Length
1.	"A Map of the World"	5:38
2.	"Family"	2:09
3.	"North"	4:19
4.	"Home"	0:42
5.	"Sisters"	4:08
6.	"Childhood"	1:26
7.	"Fall from Grace"	2:37
8.	"Memory"	0:55
9.	"Gone"	6:31
10.	"Flight"	0:54
11.	"Alone"	1:22
12.	"Outcasts"	1:30
13.	"Sunday"	1:38
14.	"Discovery"	2:34
15.	"Acceptance"	1:15
16.	"Realization"	1:23
17.	"Soliloquy"	2:52
18.	"Night"	2:00
19.	"Sunrise"	0:51
20.	"Resolution"	3:46
21.	"Pictures"	0:21
22.	"Patience"	1:22
23.	"Transition"	0:52
24.	"Reunion"	1:17
25.	"Renewal"	1:53
26.	"Homecoming"	3:25
27.	"Forgiving"	4:36
28.	"Holding Us"	4:09

== Personnel ==
- Pat Metheny – acoustic guitars, piano, keyboards
- Gil Goldstein – orchestrator, conductor, organ
- Steve Rodby – acoustic bass
- Dave Samuels – percussion

Orchestra

- Virgil Blackwell – bass clarinet
- Richard Locker – cello (as leader)
- John Moses, Paul Garment, Steven Hartman – clarinet
- William Blount – clarinet (as leader)
- John Feeney – double bass (basses, as leader)
- Brian Cassier, Jay Elfenbein, John Kulowitsch, Lewis Paer – double bass (basses)
- Melanie Feld – English horn
- Sheryl Henze – flute
- Elizabeth Mann – flute (as leader)
- Victoria Drake – harp
- Sara Cutler – harp (as leader)
- Robert Carlisle, David Wakefield, Joseph Anderer, Scott Temple – horns
- Stewart Rose – horns (as leader)
- Gordon Gottlieb – percussion (orchestral, as leader)
- Barry Centanni, Maya Gunji – percussion (orchestral)
- Alexander Rees, Ann Roggen, David Cerutti, Jill Jaffe, Liuh-Wen Ting, Lois Martin, Nicole Brockman, Ronald Lawrence, Ronald Carbone – viola
- Louise Schulman – viola (as leader)
- Anca Nicolau, Bruno Eicher, Curtis Macomber, Fritz Krakowski, Gregor Kitzis, Karl Kawahara, Krista Bennion Feeney, Mara Milkis, Marilyn Reynolds, Masako Yanagita, Mayuki Fukuhara, Mineko Yajima, Mitsuru Tsubota, Natasha Lipkina, Rebecca Muir, Rob Shaw, Robin Bushman, Sara Schwartz – violin
- Eriko Sato – violin, concertmaster

=== Production ===
- Produced by Pat Metheny and Steve Rodby
- Recorded and mixed by Rob Eaton
- Mastered by Ted Jensen at Sterling Sound, New York City
