= One Quiet Night =

Studio album by Pat Metheny
- Released: May 13, 2003
- Recorded: November 24, 2001 and January 2003
- Genre: Jazz, folk jazz, crossover jazz
- Length: 65:35
- Label: Warner Bros.
- Producer: Pat Metheny, Steve Rodby

Pat Metheny chronology
Speaking of Now (2002)	One Quiet Night (2003)	The Way Up (2005)

Professional ratings
Review scores
Source	Rating
Allmusic	4/5 stars
All About Jazz	
Encyclopedia of Popular Music	4/5 stars
The Penguin Guide to Jazz Recordings	2/4 stars

One Quiet Night is a solo acoustic guitar album by Pat Metheny that won the Grammy Award for Best New Age Album in 2004. He recorded the album at his home studio on a baritone guitar built for him by Linda Manzer.

In the liner notes, Metheny called One Quiet Night a homemade album that was recorded with one guitar, one microphone, and mistakes. Most of the album was recorded in one day, November 24, 2001, with additional recording in January 2003. He included two of his favorite songs, "My Song" by Keith Jarrett and "Ferry Cross the Mersey" by Gerry and the Pacemakers, and a more recent favorite, "Don't Know Why" by Jesse Harris, made popular by vocalist Norah Jones; "Last Train Home", which he had been playing on baritone guitar during a tour; and two new songs, "Song for the Boys" and "Over on 4th Street". Metheny produced the album and Steve Rodby was co-producer.

== Track listing ==
All tracks are written by Pat Metheny except where noted.

No.	Title	Writer(s)	Length
1.	"One Quiet Night"		5:01
2.	"Song for the Boys"		4:31
3.	"Don't Know Why"	Jesse Harris	3:08
4.	"Another Chance"		6:54
5.	"Time Goes On"		3:19
6.	"My Song"	Keith Jarrett	4:22
7.	"Peace Memory"		6:12
8.	"Ferry Cross the Mersey"	Gerry Marsden	3:58
9.	"Over on 4th Street"		3:41
10.	"I Will Find the Way"		7:51
11.	"North to South, East to West"		12:03
12.	"Last Train Home"		4:35
13.	"In All We See"		6:40

Note

- Track 13 is a bonus track available on the 2009 Nonesuch Records reissue.

== Personnel ==
- Pat Metheny – baritone guitar

=== Production ===
- Pat Metheny – producer, recording, liner notes
- Steve Rodby – co-producer
- Pete Karam – additional recording
- Rob Eaton – mixing
- Ted Jensen – mastering
- John Churchman – cover photography
- Doyle Partners – design

== Awards ==
Grammy Awards

Year	Category
2004	Grammy Award for Best New Age Album
