= Henrik Andersen (musician) =

- Born: 7 February 1966 (age 60); Copenhagen, Denmark
- Genres: Jazz, carnatic music
- Occupations: Musician, singer, songwriter
- Instrument: Guitar
- Years active: 1984–present
- Website: www.henrikandersenmusic.com

Henrik Andersen (born 7 February 1966) is a Danish jazz guitarist, singer-songwriter, multi-instrumentalist, and vocal percussionist. Among his instruments is a fifty-two string guitar made for him by Linda Manzer.

Andersen was born and raised in Copenhagen, Denmark. He graduated from the Rhythmic Music Conservatory of Copenhagen. Since the age of eighteen he has performed professionally as a guitarist and vocalist. He studied carnatic music (Indian music) with Trilok Gurtu and Pete Lockett and it became a vital element of his compositions.

He specializes in vocal percussion styles, such as beatboxing and konnakol and has taught master classes in konnakol and guitar. He performed with the jazz trio Music Spoken Here and as a soloist in The Mediterranean, a concerto for guitar and orchestra by John McLaughlin.

Andersen belonged to the World of Guitar Trio with Roman Miroshnichenko and José Antonio Rodríguez. The trio's Perfect Strangers won Best Instrumental Album in the 15th Independent Music Awards in 2016. Andersen's "Moon over Tanjore" won Best Traditional Song.

Andersen is a theatrical performer who has acted, written, and composed for shows with the Danish theater companies, TeaterTasken, Teater Refleksion, and Branar Téatars (IE). He is also a professional cartoonist.
