= Trio 99 → 00 =

Studio album by Pat Metheny
- Released: February 8, 2000
- Recorded: August 1999
- Studios: Right Track, New York City
- Genre: Jazz
- Length: 65:22
- Label: Warner Bros.
- Producers: Pat Metheny, Gil Goldstein, Steve Rodby

Pat Metheny chronology
A Map of the World (1999)	Trio 99 → 00 (2000)	Trio → Live (2000)

Professional ratings
Review scores
Source	Rating
AllMusic	4.5/5 stars
Encyclopedia of Popular Music	4/5 stars
The Penguin Guide to Jazz Recordings	3.5/4 stars

Trio 99 → 00 is an album by Pat Metheny recorded with Larry Grenadier on bass and Bill Stewart on drums and released in 2000. (The album title is often listed as "Trio 99 > 00" or "Trio 99>00".)

This trio came together as Metheny finished a two-year stretch of recording and touring around the world with his regular group. For his "vacation" period, Metheny decided to find a few like-minded younger players and continue once again to expand on his unique vision of what a guitar-led, improvisationally-driven, three-piece ensemble could suggest within this modern culture of music.

During recording, the trio "spent just a couple of days together in the studio, just for a few hours a day, just playing", according to Metheny. They did not even listen back to anything until a few weeks later.

Metheny won the 2000 Grammy Award for Best Jazz Instrumental Solo for "(Go) Get It."

== Track listing ==
All tracks are written by Pat Metheny except where noted.

No.	Title	Writer(s)	Length
1.	"(Go) Get It"		5:37
2.	"Giant Steps"	John Coltrane	7:54
3.	"Just Like the Day"		4:43
4.	"Soul Cowboy"		8:29
5.	"The Sun in Montreal"		4:36
6.	"Capricorn"	Wayne Shorter	6:19
7.	"We Had a Sister"		5:30
8.	"What Do You Want?"		5:24
9.	"A Lot of Livin' to Do"	Lee Adams, Charles Strouse	5:28
10.	"Lone Jack"	Metheny, Mays	5:31
11.	"Travels"	Metheny, Mays	5:48
Total length:			65:22

== Personnel ==
- Pat Metheny – electric and acoustic guitars
- Larry Grenadier – double bass
- Bill Stewart – drums

=== Technical personnel ===
- Pat Metheny – producer
- Gil Goldstein, Steve Rodby – co-producer
- Rob Eaton – recording, mixing
- Ted Jensen – mastering at Sterling Sound, NYC, USA
- Sagmeister inc. – artwork
- Latifa Metheny – photography

== Awards ==
Grammy Awards

Years	Winner	Title	Category
2001	Pat Metheny	"(Go) Get It."	Grammy Award for Best Jazz Instrumental Solo
