= Trio → Live =

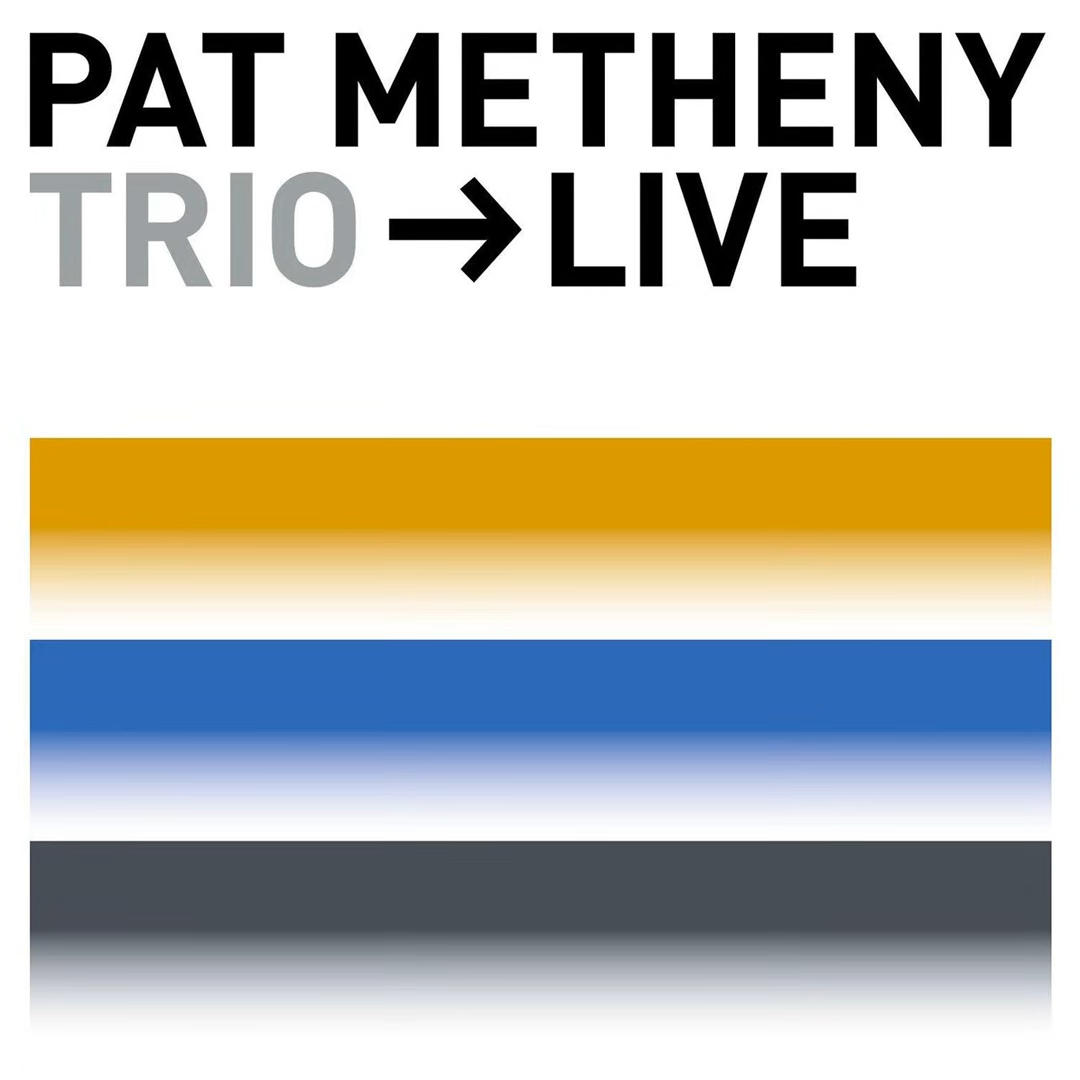

Live album by Pat Metheny
- Released: November 21, 2000
- Recorded: 1999–2000
- Studio: Right Track, New York City
- Genre: Jazz
- Length: 119:52
- Label: Warner Bros.
- Producer: Pat Metheny, Steve Rodby

Pat Metheny chronology
Trio 99→00 (2000)	Trio → Live (2000)	Speaking of Now (2002)

Professional ratings
Review scores
Source	Rating
AllMusic	4/5 stars

Trio → Live is a live album by Pat Metheny, released in 2000, recorded with Bill Stewart and Larry Grenadier. It was recorded as a live complement to the trio’s studio album Trio 99→00, released the same year. The album covers a mixture of standards, older pieces by Metheny (such as the title track from his debut album Bright Size Life) and recent compositions. It was recorded live during 1999 and 2000 on tour in Europe, Japan and the United States, and was co-produced by Steve Rodby.

== Track listing ==
All tracks are written by Pat Metheny except where noted.

Disc one:
No.	Title	Length
1.	"Bright Size Life"	4:18
2.	"Question and Answer"	19:53
3.	"Giant Steps" (John Coltrane)	9:51
4.	"Into the Dream"	4:27
5.	"So May It Secretly Begin"	7:10
6.	"The Bat"	7:28
7.	"All The Things You Are" (Oscar Hammerstein II/Jerome Kern)	9:37

Disc two:
No.	Title	Length
1.	"James" (Metheny/Mays)	6:08
2.	"Unity Village"	5:18
3.	"Soul Cowboy"	11:06
4.	"Night Turns into Day"	8:20
5.	"Faith Healer"	18:09
6.	"Counting Texas"	8:07

== Personnel ==
- Pat Metheny – acoustic and electric guitars, guitar synthesizer, 42-string Pikasso guitar, and 12-string fretless guitar
- Larry Grenadier – double bass
- Bill Stewart – drums

=== Technical personnel ===
- Pat Metheny, Steve Rodby – producer
- David Sholemson – projet coordinator
- David Oakes – recording
- Rob Eaton – mixing
- Ted Jensen – mastering at Sterling Sound, NYC, USA
- Hou Viels – photography

== Charts ==
Chart performance for Trio → Live
Chart (2000)	Peak position
US Top Jazz Albums (Billboard)	11
US Traditional Jazz Albums (Billboard)	3
