= Armando Marçal =

Brazilian percussionist (born 1956)

- Also known as: Marçalzinho
- Born: Armando de Souza Marçal; 17 December 1956 (age 69); Rio de Janeiro, Brazil
- Genres: Brazilian jazz, jazz fusion
- Occupation: Musician
- Instrument: Percussion
- Years active: 1970s–present
- Formerly of: Pat Metheny Group

Armando de Souza Marçal, better known as Marçalzinho (born 17 December 1956) is a Brazilian percussionist.

== Biography ==
Marçal started in music at 14. As the son of Mestre Marçal (1930-1994) who operated the largest Brazilian samba school GRES Portela from 1978 to 1986, while his grandfather, Armando Marçal was a famous samba composer and formed a famous samba duo together with Alcebíades Barcelos.

In the United States, Marçal worked with artists such as Pat Metheny and Paul Simon. In Brazil, he worked alongside big names in Brazilian popular music, such as Gal Costa, Jorge Ben Jor, Caetano Veloso, João Bosco, Djavan, Vanessa da Mata, Chico Buarque, 'Blitz', Ivan Lins and Elis Regina. He was introduced to percussion in Paralamas do Sucesso and was also a member of the band 'Lulu'.

== Discography ==
=== Solo albums ===
- 2007: Lado a Lado (Tratore)

=== Collaborations ===
With Julio Iglesias

- 1985: Libra (Sony)

With Pat Metheny Group

- 1987: Still Life (Talking) (Geffen)
- 1989: Letter from Home (Geffen)
- 1993: The Road to You (Geffen), recorded live in Europe

With Pat Metheny

- 1992: Secret Story (Geffen)

With Stephan Remmler

- 1988: Lotto (Mercury)

With Djavan

- 1989: Djavan (Discos CBS)

With Paul Simon

- 1991: The Rhythm of the Saints (Warner Bros)
- 1993: The Paul Simon Anthology (Warner Bros.)

With Matt Bianco

- 1991: Samba in Your Casa (East West)

With Lio

- 2005: Pop Model (ZE)

With Ivan Lins

- 2007: Saudades de Casa (Warner Music Latina)

With Stefano Bollani

- 2008: Carioca (EmArcy)

With João Bosco

- 2014: Samba Fever (ARC)
