= Linda Manzer =

Canadian master guitar-maker (born 1952)

Linda Manzer OC
- Born: July 2, 1952 (age 73)
- Occupation: Luthier
- Instrument: Guitar
- Years active: 1970s–present
- Website: www.manzer.com

Linda Jane Manzer OC (born July 2, 1952) is a Canadian master luthier renowned for her archtop, flat top, and harp guitars.

== Career ==
Manzer was a folk singer in high school and played guitar. Her career began when she wanted a dulcimer, but she could not afford to buy one, so she built one from a kit. She attended two art colleges, where she studied painting. For the craft of making flattop guitars she studied with Jean Larrivée from 1974 to 1978. She went to New York in 1983 and 1984 and studied archtop building with Jimmy D'Aquisto.

In addition to her standard models, she has designed and built by hand over 50 guitar prototypes, including soprano guitar, and an acoustic baritone guitar, she also designed the first acoustic sitar guitar plus several multinecked harp guitars.

She has designed and built over 25 instruments for jazz musician Pat Metheny, including the Pikasso, which has 42 strings and four necks. He has played the Pikasso on many albums including Imaginary Day, What's It All About, and Beyond the Missouri Sky (Short Stories). He played her baritone guitar on the album One Quiet Night. She built and co-designed with Metheny a limited edition of 30 handmade Metheny-Manzer signature models to celebrate their 30-year collaboration.

Professional musicians who own Manzer guitars include Julian Lage, Carlos Santana, Henrik Andersen, Stephen Fearing, Ted Ludwig, Tim Lerch, Milton Nascimento, Liona Boyd, Heather Bishop, Bruce Cockburn, Paul Simon, Roy Patterson, Marie-Lynn Hammond, Susan Crowe, and Gordon Lightfoot.

Her custom designs include the 52-stringed Medusa owned by Danish musician Henrik Andersen.

She was appointed as an Officer of the Order of Canada in 2023. She currently resides in both Toronto and Almonte, Ontario.

== Pikasso Guitar ==
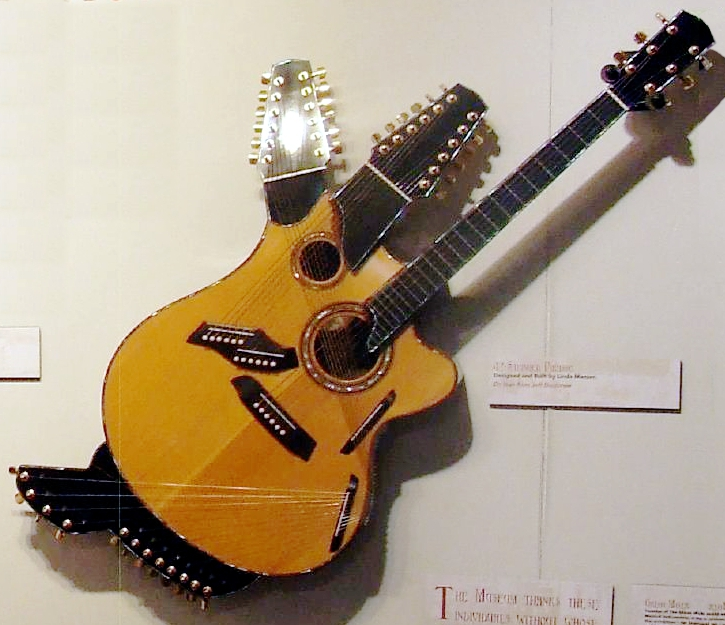
Pikasso guitar

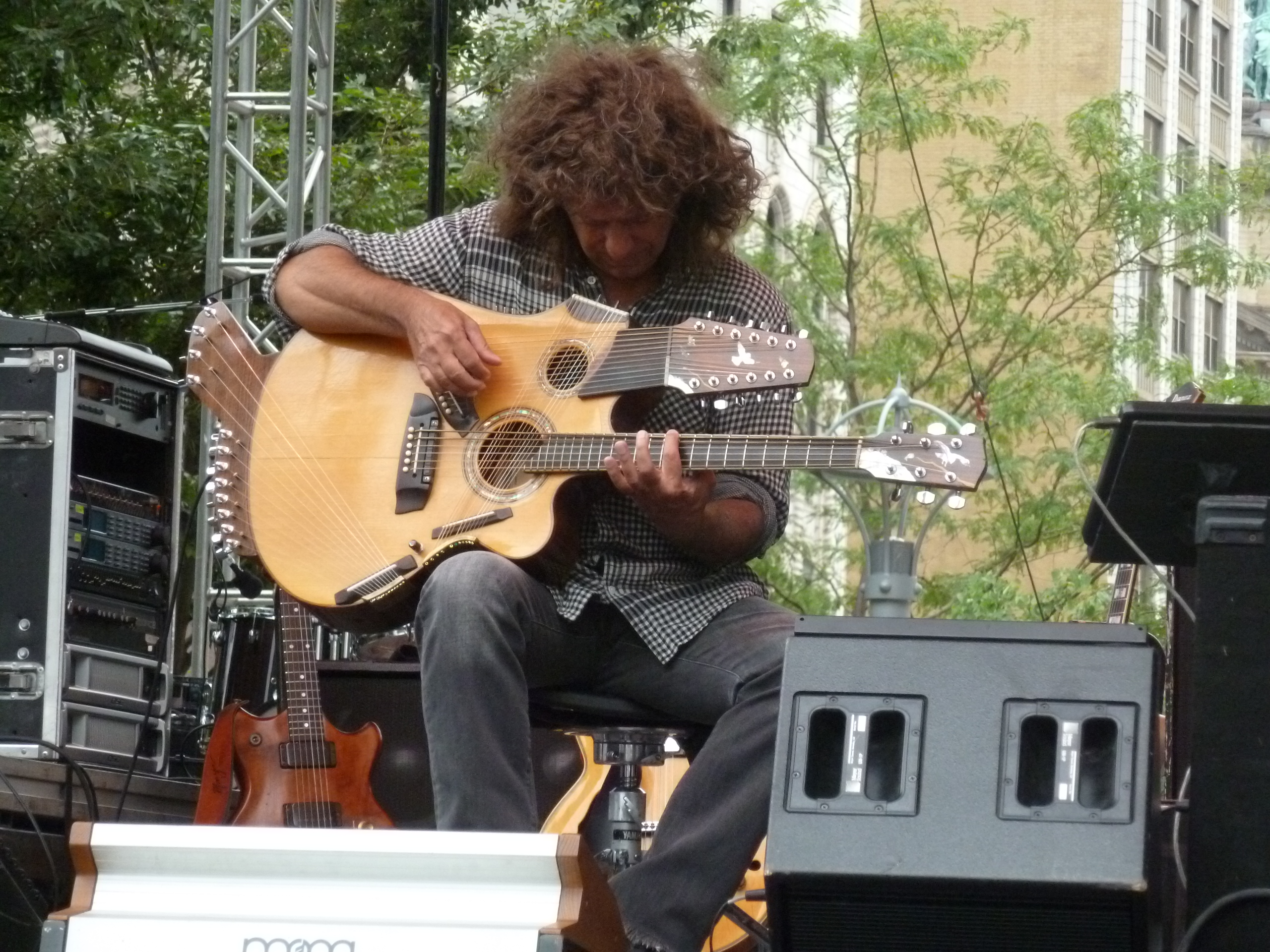
Pat Metheny with the 42-string Pikasso guitar

In 1984 Pat Metheny requested a guitar that had "as many strings as possible". Manzer came up with the Pikasso, a guitar with 42 strings arranged in four string sections, including a hexaphonic pickup to interface with Metheny's Synclavier synthesizer. The Pikasso has two holes for mounting the guitar on a stand, allowing the guitarist to play the guitar without having to hold it. Metheny plays the Pikasso on "Finding and Believing" from Secret Story, "Montevideo" and "Dismantling Utopia" from Quartet, "Into the Dream" from Imaginary Day, and "The Sound of Water" from his Quartet album with Brad Mehldau. While building the Pikasso, Manzer invented "The Wedge" body geometry: Because there were so many strings crisscrossing, Manzer wanted Metheny to be able to see all the strings while looking down at the guitar. She settled on a wedge shape, with the sides of the guitar being skinnier under the arm and wider on the knee. This enabled Metheny to have a slight aerial view of the strings because the guitar leaned back a little. The added benefit was it was more physically comfortable. In the 1980s she began using the "Manzer Wedge" design for all of her guitars.

== See also ==
- Custom-made instruments
