= Like Minds (album) =

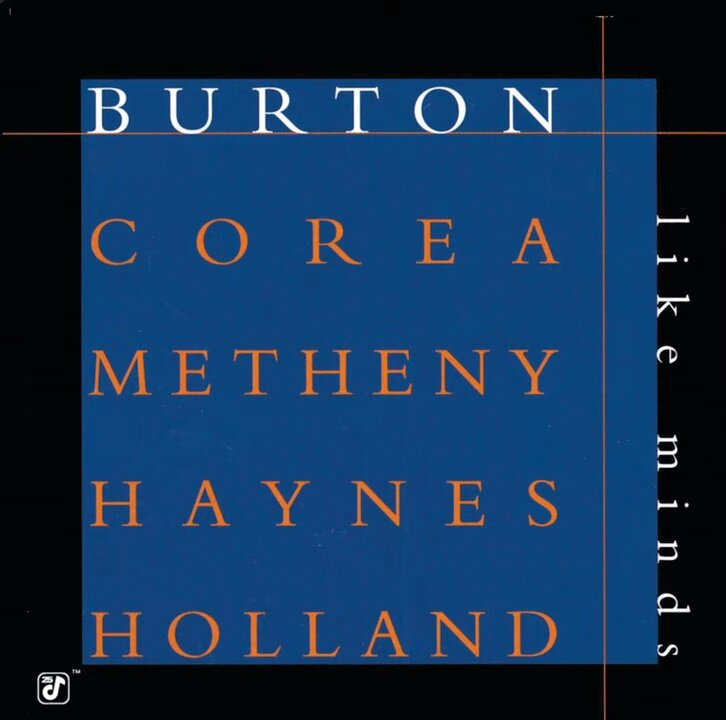

Studio album by Gary Burton with Chick Corea, Pat Metheny, Roy Haynes, Dave Holland
- Released: November 3, 1998
- Recorded: December 15–17, 1997
- Studio: Avatar, New York City
- Genre: Jazz
- Length: 68:25
- Label: Concord
- Producer: Gary Burton

Gary Burton chronology
Ástor Piazzolla Reunion (1998)	Like Minds (1998)	Libertango (2000)

Chick Corea chronology
Live at the Blue Note (1998)	Like Minds (1998)	A Week at The Blue Note (1998)

Pat Metheny chronology
Imaginary Day (1997)	Like Minds (1998)	Jim Hall & Pat Metheny (1999)

Professional ratings
Review scores
Source	Rating
AllMusic	4.5/5 stars
The Penguin Guide to Jazz Recordings	3.5/4 stars

Like Minds is a 1998 jazz album by the vibraphonist Gary Burton with the pianist Chick Corea, guitarist Pat Metheny, drummer Roy Haynes, and double bass player Dave Holland. In 1999, the album won a Grammy Award for Best Jazz Instrumental Performance, Individual or Group. The recording sessions took place at Avatar Studios in New York City.

== Track listing ==
No.	Title	Writer(s)	Length
1.	"Question and Answer"	Pat Metheny	6:24
2.	"Elucidation"	Pat Metheny	5:21
3.	"Windows"	Chick Corea	6:17
4.	"Futures"	Chick Corea	10:41
5.	"Like Minds"	Gary Burton	5:50
6.	"Country Roads"	Gary Burton	6:26
7.	"Tears of Rain"	Pat Metheny	6:33
8.	"Soon"	George Gershwin, Ira Gershwin	6:24
9.	"For a Thousand Years"	Pat Metheny	5:23
10.	"Straight Up and Down"	Chick Corea	9:02
Total length:			68:25

== Personnel ==
- Gary Burton – vibraphone
- Chick Corea – piano
- Pat Metheny – guitar
- Roy Haynes – drums
- Dave Holland – double bass

== Sources and external links ==
- Reviews at All About Jazz
- Like Minds at Discogs (list of releases)
