= Speaking of Now =

Studio album by Pat Metheny Group
- Released: February 12, 2002
- Studios: Right Track, New York City
- Genre: Jazz fusion
- Length: 72:05
- Label: Warner Bros.
- Producers: Pat Metheny and Lyle Mays

Pat Metheny chronology
Trio → Live (2000)	Speaking of Now (2002)	One Quiet Night (2003)

Professional ratings
Review scores
Source	Rating
AllMusic	4/5 stars
All About Jazz	(favorable)
The Penguin Guide to Jazz Recordings	3/4 stars

Speaking of Now is the tenth studio album by the Pat Metheny Group. It was released in 2002 by Warner Bros. The band was awarded the Grammy Award for Best Contemporary Jazz Album for the album in 2003.

Speaking of Now marks the first appearances of drummer Antonio Sánchez and multi-instrumentalist Cuong Vu as members of Metheny's band. Cameroonian musician Richard Bona also participated in the album's recording and tour, the latter of which particularly showcased his abilities on vocals and bass guitar.

In 2003, as part of the album's promotion, a concert was recorded in Japan and released on DVD and the Group performed on the PBS series Austin City Limits.

== Track listing ==
All tracks are written by Pat Metheny & Lyle Mays, except where noted.

No.	Title	Writer(s)	Length
1.	"As It Is"		7:42
2.	"Proof"		10:18
3.	"Another Life"	Metheny	7:13
4.	"The Gathering Sky"		9:27
5.	"You" (song ends at 8:25; hidden intro to "On Her Way" directly follows)	Metheny	8:57
6.	"On Her Way"		5:42
7.	"A Place in the World"		9:54
8.	"Afternoon"	Metheny	4:46
9.	"Wherever You Go"		8:04
Total length:			72:05

Bonus Track for Japan
No.	Title	Writer(s)	Length
10.	"Epilogue" (Japanese bonus track)	Metheny	4:07
Total length:			76:35

On the Japanese pressing, an extra 30 seconds of silence is added at the end of "Wherever You Go" to create a longer gap before the bonus track "Epilogue".

== Personnel ==
- Pat Metheny – acoustic and electric guitars, guitar synthesizer
- Lyle Mays – piano, keyboards
- Steve Rodby – double bass, cello (track 1)
- Richard Bona – vocals, percussion, acoustic guitar (track 4), fretless bass (tracks 7, 9)
- Cuong Vu – trumpet, vocals
- Antonio Sánchez – drums

Additional musicians

- Dave Samuels – percussion, marimba

=== Technical staff ===
- Pat Metheny – producer
- Steve Rodby, Lyle Mays – co-producer
- Rob Eaton – recording, mixing
- Ted Jensen – mastering
- Doyle Partners – artwork, design

== Charts ==
Chart performance for Speaking of Now
Chart (2002)	Peak position
French Albums (SNEP)	72
German Albums (Offizielle Top 100)	24
Hungarian Albums (MAHASZ)	32
Italian Albums (FIMI)	9
Japanese Albums (Oricon)	45
Polish Albums (ZPAV)	2
Swedish Albums (Sverigetopplistan)	51
UK Albums (Official Charts)	134
UK Jazz & Blues Albums (Official Charts)	2
US Billboard 200	101
US Top Contemporary Jazz Albums (Billboard)	1
US Top Jazz Albums (Billboard)	2

== Certifications ==
Certifications for Speaking of Now
Region	Certification	Certified units/sales
Poland (ZPAV)	Platinum	20,000^{*}
^{*} Sales figures based on certification alone.

== Awards ==
Grammy Awards

Year	Category
2003	Grammy Award for Best Contemporary Jazz Album
