= The Road to You =

Live album by Pat Metheny Group
- Released: 1993
- Venue: Italy, France
- Genre: Jazz, jazz fusion
- Length: 74:03
- Label: Geffen
- Producer: Pat Metheny

Pat Metheny chronology
Secret Story (1992)	The Road to You (1993)	Zero Tolerance for Silence (1994)

Professional ratings
Review scores
Source	Rating
AllMusic	4.5/5 stars
The Penguin Guide to Jazz Recordings	3/4 stars
Tom Hull	B

The Road to You is the second live album by the Pat Metheny Group that won the Grammy Award for Best Contemporary Jazz Performance.

The songs were recorded during concerts in Naples, Bari, Pescara, and Iesi, Italy; and Paris, Marseille, and Besançon, France. The last song is a solo guitar studio recording from the video More Travels.

== Track listing ==
All tracks are written by Pat Metheny except where noted:

Side one:
No.	Title	Writer(s)	Length
1.	"Have You Heard"		6:47
2.	"First Circle"	Metheny, Mays	9:02

Side two:
No.	Title	Writer(s)	Length
1.	"The Road to You"		5:45
2.	"Half Life of Absolution"	Metheny, Mays	15:16
3.	"Last Train Home"		5:19

Side three:
No.	Title	Writer(s)	Length
1.	"Better Days Ahead"		5:12
2.	"Naked Moon"		5:29
3.	"Beat 70"	Metheny, Mays	5:05

Side four:
No.	Title	Writer(s)	Length
1.	"Letter from Home"		2:33
2.	"Third Wind"	Metheny, Mays	9:49
3.	"Solo from More Travels"		3:42

== Personnel ==
- Pat Metheny – acoustic and electric guitar, guitar synthesizer
- Lyle Mays – piano, keyboards
- Steve Rodby – acoustic and electric bass
- Paul Wertico – drums
- Armando Marçal – percussion, timbales, congas, vocals
- Pedro Aznar – vocals, acoustic guitar, percussion, tenor saxophone, steel drums, vibraphone, marimba, melodica

== Awards ==
Grammy Awards

Year	Category
1994	Grammy Award for Best Contemporary Jazz Album
