= The Way Up =

Studio album by Pat Metheny Group
- Released: January 25, 2005
- Recorded: 2003–2004
- Studios: Right Track, New York City
- Genres: Jazz, jazz fusion
- Length: 68:07
- Label: Nonesuch
- Producer: Pat Metheny

Pat Metheny chronology
| One Quiet Night (2003) | The Way Up (2005) | Metheny/Mehldau (2006) |

Professional ratings
Review scores
| Source | Rating |
|---|---|
| Allmusic | 4.5/5 stars |
| All About Jazz | (favourable) |
| The Penguin Guide to Jazz Recordings | 3/4 stars |
| Tom Hull | B+ |

The Way Up is the eleventh and final studio album by the Pat Metheny Group. It was released in 2005 and won the Grammy Award for Best Contemporary Jazz Album in 2006. It is the last album in the prolific three-decade collaboration of Pat Metheny and Lyle Mays.

== Background ==
The album consists of one 68-minute-long piece, split into four tracks. The piece is through-composed, featuring complex shifts of dynamics and meter, and precise transitions between solo improvisation sections.

Swiss multi-instrumentalist Gregoire Maret is showcased on the harmonica and joined the Group for the album's world tour. The tour included a performance at the Montreal Jazz Festival, and an official concert recording of the Seoul, South Korea appearance was released on DVD, HD DVD, and Blu-Ray.

== Track listing ==
All tracks are written by Pat Metheny and Lyle Mays.

| No. | Title | Length |
|---|---|---|
| 1. | "Opening" | 5:17 |
| 2. | "Part One" | 26:27 |
| 3. | "Part Two" | 20:29 |
| 4. | "Part Three" | 15:54 |

== Personnel ==
- Pat Metheny – acoustic guitars, electric guitars, guitar synthesizer, slide guitar, toy guitar, producer
- Lyle Mays – piano, keyboards, toy xylophone, producer
- Steve Rodby – acoustic bass, electric bass, cello, violin, producer
- Cuong Vu – trumpet, vocals, toy whistle
- Grégoire Maret – harmonica
- Antonio Sánchez – drums, toy xylophone

Additional musicians

- Richard Bona – percussion, vocals, toy guitar
- Dave Samuels – percussion

== Awards ==
Grammy Awards

| Year | Category |
|---|---|
| 2006 | Grammy Award for Best Contemporary Jazz Album |

== Charts ==
Chart performance
| Chart (2005) | Peak position |
|---|---|
| Belgian Albums (Ultratop Flanders) | 84 |
| Belgian Albums (Ultratop Wallonia) | 86 |
| Canadian Albums (Nielsen SoundScan) | 106 |
| Dutch Albums (Album Top 100) | 68 |
| European Albums (Billboard) | 24 |
| French Albums (SNEP) | 61 |
| German Albums (Offizielle Top 100) | 29 |
| Italian Albums (FIMI) | 11 |
| Japanese Albums (Oricon) | 34 |
| Polish Albums (ZPAV) | 1 |
| Spanish Albums (Promusicae) | 79 |
| Swedish Albums (Sverigetopplistan) | 40 |
| UK Albums (Official Charts) | 117 |
| UK Jazz & Blues Albums (Official Charts) | 5 |
| US Billboard 200 | 99 |
| US Top Contemporary Jazz Albums (Billboard) | 1 |
| US Top Jazz Albums (Billboard) | 2 |

== Certifications ==
Certifications
| Region | Certification | Certified units/sales |
|---|---|---|
| Poland (ZPAV) | Gold | 5,000^{*} |
^{*} Sales figures based on certification alone.
