= We Live Here =

Studio album by Pat Metheny Group
- Released: January 1995
- Recorded: 1994
- Studios: The Hit Factory, New York City
- Genres: Jazz, jazz fusion
- Length: 67:09
- Label: Geffen
- Producers: Pat Metheny, Lyle Mays, Steve Rodby

Pat Metheny chronology
I Can See Your House from Here (1994)	We Live Here (1995)	Quartet (1996)

Professional ratings
Review scores
Source	Rating
AllMusic	3.5/5 stars
The Encyclopedia of Popular Music	4/5 stars
The Penguin Guide to Jazz Recordings	3/4 stars

We Live Here is the seventh studio album by the Pat Metheny Group. It won the Grammy Award for Best Contemporary Jazz Album in 1996. A concert film from the tour supporting the album was recorded at Gotanda U-Port Hall, Tokyo, Japan, in October 1995.

== Track listing ==
All tracks are written by Pat Metheny and Lyle Mays except where noted.

No.	Title	Writer(s)	Length
1.	"Here to Stay"		7:39
2.	"And Then I Knew"		7:53
3.	"The Girls Next Door"		5:30
4.	"To the End of the World"		12:15
5.	"We Live Here"		4:12
6.	"Episode d'Azur"	Mays	8:45
7.	"Something to Remind You"		7:04
8.	"Red Sky"		7:36
9.	"Stranger in Town"		6:11
Total length:			1:07:05

== Personnel ==
- Pat Metheny – guitars, guitar synthesizer
- Lyle Mays – piano, keyboards
- Steve Rodby – acoustic and electric bass
- Paul Wertico – drums
- David Blamires – vocals
- Mark Ledford – vocals, trumpet, Flugelhorn, Whistling
- Luis Conte – percussion

Additional musicians

- Sammy Merendino – drum programming
- Dave Samuels – cymbal rolls

== Awards ==
Grammy Awards

Year	Category
1996	Grammy Award for Best Contemporary Jazz Album
