= If Trees Could Fly =

Studio album by Marc Johnson, Eric Longsworth
- Released: 1998
- Recorded: November 26, 1996 and June 12, 1997
- Studio: Current Sounds Studio, NYC
- Genre: Post-bop, jazz
- Length: 53:33
- Label: Intuition Music INT 3228 2
- Producer: Marc Johnson, Eric Longsworth

Marc Johnson chronology
Magic Labyrinth (1995)	If Trees Could Fly (1998)	Bass and Cello (2004)

If Trees Could Fly is a studio album by the jazz acoustic bassist Marc Johnson and the electric cellist Eric Longsworth. The record was released via the Intuition Music label in 1998. It contains eleven compositions arranged and performed only on bass viol and cello.

== Reception ==
Professional ratings
Review scores
Source	Rating
AllMusic	2.5/5 stars
The Penguin Guide to Jazz	3/4 stars
PopMatters	8/10 stars

Chris Massey of PopMatters stated: "There are only two instruments present on If Trees Could Fly: bass and electric cello. This is all: Mr. Johnson on the bass, Mr. Longsworth on the electric cello. The beauty of the music upon this album is the interaction between these two unadorned sounds. The bass typically paints a rolling background, when not off on a rhythmic tangent, and Mr. Johnson is always on top of his craft. So is Mr. Longsworth. The cello is sometimes staccato, sometimes swelling, always precise. The music, of course, is more than the unadorned voices of two men and their instruments. The instrumental record finds a third voice in the mixture and interaction of both the bass and the cello... This album is aptly named—if trees could fly, it would hardly match the musical accomplishment of these two musicians".

== Track listing ==
All tracks are written by Marc Johnson and Eric Longsworth.

No.	Title	Length
1.	"Rève-À-Ça"	5:37
2.	"A Blues"	6:53
3.	"Ton Sur Ton"	6:44
4.	"Dancin' to the Coffee Machine"	5:05
5.	"Lullaby"	5:01
6.	"Longworld"	2:33
7.	"Au Clair De La Femme"	4:07
8.	"Spanish Fly"	6:13
9.	"Her Majesty (The Turtle)"	4:00
10.	"Seulement"	4:31
11.	"Ton Sur Ton – Reprise"	2:15
Total length:		53:33

== Personnel ==
Band

- Marc Johnson – bass
- Eric Longsworth – electric cello

Production

- Pierre Arpin – photography
- Bruce Rosen – cover painting
