= 80/81 =

Studio album by Pat Metheny
- Released: September 1,1980
- Recorded: May 26–29, 1980
- Studios: Talent, Oslo, Norway
- Genres: Jazz, folk jazz
- Length: 80:25
- Label: ECM
- Producer: Manfred Eicher

Pat Metheny chronology
American Garage (1979)	80/81 (1980)	As Falls Wichita, So Falls Wichita Falls (1981)

80/81 is a double album by jazz guitarist Pat Metheny recorded over four days in May 1980 and released on ECM September 1, of the same year. Metheny leads a quartet consisting of the rhythm section of Charlie Haden and Jack DeJohnette, with saxophone duties alternating between Dewey Redman and Michael Brecker.

== Background ==
Metheny toured in the U.S. in fall 1980 with a quartet including Redman, Haden and drummer Paul Motian. In the summer of 1981, he toured Europe with the full 80/81 lineup featured on the album.

== Reception ==
Professional ratings
Review scores
Source	Rating
AllMusic	4.5/5 stars
DownBeat	4/5 stars
The Penguin Guide to Jazz Recordings	3/4 stars
The Rolling Stone Jazz Record Guide	4/5 stars

Writing for High Fidelity, Don Heckman characterized the album as decidedly more jazz-oriented than Metheny's previous work, which he believed was attributed to a different slate of session musicians. He labeled Michael Brecker's saxophone playing on "Two Folk Songs: 1st" as "one of his finest recorded moments" and also thought his performance on "Every Day (I Thank You)" was of high quality. Heckman was complimentary of Metheny's approach to the material, particularly for his varied use of guitar tones and the restraint exercised in his playing, although Heckman felt that some of Metheny's guitar licks lacked cohesion.

In a review for AllMusic, Richard S. Ginell wrote that "Metheny's credibility with the jazz community went way up with the release of this package", and called the album "a superb two-CD collaboration with a quartet of outstanding jazz musicians that dared to be uncompromising at a time when most artists would have merely continued pursuing their electric commercial successes."

In an article at Between Sound and Space, Tyran Grillo called the album a "still-fresh sonic concoction", and noted that "With 80/81, Pat Metheny took one step closer to his dream of working with The Prophet of Freedom (Ornette Coleman) (a dream he finally achieved with 1985's Song X)". He concluded: "Like much of what Metheny produces, 80/81 is wide open in two ways. First in its far-reaching vision, and second it its willingness to embrace the listener. Like a dolly zoom, he enacts an illusion of simultaneous recession and approach, lit like a fuse that leads not to an explosion, but to more fuse."

JazzTimes included the album in an article titled "10 Best Jazz Albums of the 1980s: Critics' Picks", in which Philip Booth stated: "Enlisting four of the musicians he most admired... the 26-year-old guitarist successfully translated the sound in his head to beautifully open, airy, sometimes urgent recordings."

== Track listing ==
=== Original release ===
All music is composed by Pat Metheny except as noted.

Side one
No.	Title	Writer(s)	Length
1.	"Two Folk Songs: 1st"		13:17
2.	"Two Folk Songs: 2nd"	Charlie Haden	7:31

Side two
No.	Title	Writer(s)	Length
1.	"80/81"		7:28
2.	"The Bat"		5:58
3.	"Turnaround"	Ornette Coleman	7:05

Side three
No.	Title	Writer(s)	Length
1.	"Open"	Metheny; DeJohnette; Redman; Haden; Brecker	14:25
2.	"Pretty Scattered"		6:56

Side four
No.	Title	Length
1.	"Every Day (I Thank You)"	13:16
2.	"Goin' Ahead"	3:56

=== Single CD edition ===
No.	Title	Length
1.	"Two Folk Songs: One / Two"	20:52
2.	"Every Day (I Thank You)"	13:21
3.	"Goin' Ahead"	3:51
4.	"80/81"	7:34
5.	"The Bat"	6:05
6.	"Turnaround"	7:04

== Personnel ==
- Pat Metheny – acoustic and electric guitars
- Charlie Haden – double bass
- Jack DeJohnette – drums
- Dewey Redman – tenor saxophone (tracks B1, B2, C1 & C2)
- Michael Brecker – tenor saxophone (tracks A1, A2, B2, C1, C2 & D1)

=== Technical personnel ===
- Manfred Eicher – producer
- Jan Erik Kongshaug – recording engineer
- Barbara Wojirsch – design
- Dag Alveng – back photography
- Rainer Drechsler – inside photography
