= Joseph Anderer =

American classical horn player

Joseph Anderer is principal horn and a founding member of St. Luke's Chamber Ensemble and the Orchestra of St. Luke's. He has also been a member of the Metropolitan Opera Orchestra’s horn section since 1984, serving as acting Principal Horn for season 1984-5 and has been Principal Horn since 2003-2004. Before joining the Met Orchestra, he was a frequent performer with the New York Philharmonic for fourteen seasons, and participated in many concerts, recordings and tours in the US, Europe, Asia, Australia and South America. He was also a member of the Boehm Quintette for many years, and premiered many works composed for that ensemble. As soloist, he has appeared with the Orchestra of St. Luke’s in Carnegie Hall including performing as soloist in the American premier of Benjamin Britten’s “Now Sleeps the Crimson Petal”, as well as at many festivals. He holds degrees from The Juilliard School, where he was a student of Ranier DeIntinis. Mr. Anderer is active in the recording studio, performing chamber music, operas, symphonic works, solo works, TV commercials and films along with performing in recitals with singers and other musicians. He has also appeared on albums by Dawn Upshaw, Billy Joel, Mandy Patinkin, Grover Washington, Jr., Marcus Roberts and Tony Bennett & k.d. lang. He has been the Horn Coach at the Verbier Festival for many years and has been a member of the faculties of the Mason Gross School at Rutgers University and the Steinhardt School of New York University.
