= Road to the Sun =

Studio album by Pat Metheny
- Released: March 5, 2021
- Studio: John Kilgore Sound and Recording (tracks 1–4); Henson Recording Studios (tracks 5–10); 67 Studio, NYC67 Studio, NYC (track 11)
- Genre: Classical crossover; chamber jazz; chamber music
- Length: 56:39
- Label: BMG-Modern
- Producer: Pat Metheny, Steve Rodby

Pat Metheny chronology
From This Place (2020)	Road to the Sun (2021)	Side-Eye NYC (V1.IV) (2021)

Professional ratings
Aggregate scores
Source	Rating
Metacritic	81/100
Review scores
Source	Rating
AllMusic	4/5 stars
All About Jazz	5/5 stars
Tom Hull	B

Road to the Sun is a studio album by American jazz guitarist Pat Metheny, released in March 2021 on BMG's Modern Recordings label. The liner notes include credits for photos of a roseate tern and sooty tern, while the bird on the front cover most closely resembles a black-billed magpie.

== Track listing ==
All tracks are written by Pat Metheny, except the final, which is by Arvo Pärt.

Four Paths of Light
No.	Title	Length
1.	"Part 1"	4:15
2.	"Part 2"	6:22
3.	"Part 3"	5:30
4.	"Part 4"	3:10

Road to the Sun
No.	Title	Length
5.	"Part 1"	4:22
6.	"Part 2"	6:45
7.	"Part 3"	3:29
8.	"Part 4"	4:06
9.	"Part 5"	6:25
10.	"Part 6"	3:24

No.	Title	Writer(s)	Length
11.	"Für Alina"	Arvo Pärt	8:31

== Personnel ==
- Jason Vieaux – guitar (tracks 1–4)
- Los Angeles Guitar Quartet – guitars (tracks 5–10)
- Pat Metheny – guitar (tracks 6,9), 42-string Pikasso guitar (track 11)

=== Technical personnel ===
- Pat Metheny – producer
- Steve Rodby – co-producer
- Pete Karam – recording, mixing, mastering
- Doyle Partners – artwork and design
