= Mark Ledford =

American musician (1960–2004)

- Born: March 10, 1960; Detroit, Michigan, U.S.
- Died: November 1, 2004 (aged 44) Los Angeles, California
- Genres: Jazz, R&B, pop-rap, hip hop
- Occupations: Musician, singer, record producer, audio engineer
- Instruments: Vocals, trumpet, guitar
- Years active: 1982–1998

Mark Ledford (March 10, 1960 – November 1, 2004) was an American trumpeter, singer, and guitarist. He was known for his multi-instrumentalism and his membership in the Pat Metheny Group.

== Music career ==
Ledford was born and grew up in Detroit, Michigan. He studied the violin and trumpet growing up. He attended Berklee College of Music between 1978 and 1982. After he graduated, he took a job in advertising while doing session work with Stephanie Mills, Jon Hendricks, Special EFX, Michael Brecker, Kevin Eubanks, Don Byron, Living Colour, Prince, and Bill Evans. He would later contribute to the soundtracks for the Spike Lee films Mo' Better Blues and Do the Right Thing.

In 1986, he began a working relationship with Pat Metheny, appearing live with the Pat Metheny Group and on numerous recordings, including the Grammy award winning albums Secret Story and Still Life (Talking). He worked with Bobby McFerrin's a cappella group, Circle, and he played in Joe Locke's Storytelling Band.

Between 1990 and 1992, Ledford taught master classes in trumpet at the Banff Centre in Alberta, Canada. In 1998, he released a solo album, Miles 2 Go, a tribute to Miles Davis.

On November 1, 2004, Ledford died of heart failure in Los Angeles.

== Discography ==
With Uri Caine

- Love Fugue: Robert Schumann (Winter & Winter, 2000)

With Faith Evans

- Faith (Bad Boy, 1995)

With Joe Locke

- Longing (Timeless, 1990)
- Storytelling (Sirocco, 2001)

With Pat Metheny Group

- Still Life (Talking) (Geffen, 1987)
- We Live Here (Geffen, 1995)
- Imaginary Day (Warner Bros., 1997)

With Pat Metheny

- Secret Story (Geffen, 1992)

With The Rippingtons

- Black Diamond (Windham Hill, 1997)

With Special EFX

- Global Village (GRP, 1992)

With Eliane Elias

- A Long Story (Manhattan, 1991)
