= Jim Hall & Pat Metheny =

Studio album by Jim Hall and Pat Metheny
- Released: April 27, 1999
- Recorded: July–August 1998
- Venue: Manchester Craftsmen's Guild, Pittsburgh, Pennsylvania
- Studio: Right Track, New York City
- Genre: Jazz
- Length: 73:47
- Label: Telarc
- Producer: Gil Goldstein, Steve Rodby, Pat Metheny

Jim Hall chronology
By Arrangement (1998)	Jim Hall & Pat Metheny (1999)	Grand Slam: Live at the Regattabar, Cambridge Massachusetts (2000)

Pat Metheny chronology
Like Minds (1998)	Jim Hall & Pat Metheny (1999)	A Map of the World (1999)

Jim Hall & Pat Metheny is an album by jazz guitarists Jim Hall and Pat Metheny that was released by Telarc on April 27, 1999. The album contains eleven studio recording tracks and six live tracks.

== Reception ==
Professional ratings
Review scores
Source	Rating
Allmusic	4/5 stars
All About Jazz	(favorable)
The Penguin Guide to Jazz Recordings	3/4 stars

Rick Anderson, writing for AllMusic, said that Hall and Metheny "...are such a natural fit that it's amazing no one's thought of getting them together for a duo album before." He said the "...interplay is nothing short of astounding, and the five improvisational pieces...sometimes sound as organized as the standards." He said "...the complete lack of high frequencies in both guitarists' tones might leave you wondering if you've got water in your ear", but that it "really is a wonderful album."

The All About Jazz review said that "what we hear...is certainly an affinity", and that the record is "...worthy of repeated listening". They praised the composition as well, saying that they "assume a deceptive melodic simplicity deepened in profundity by unconventional intervals or modulations that proceed unhurriedly as the sound washes over the listener."

== Track listing ==
All tracks are written by Pat Metheny and Jim Hall except where noted.

No.	Title	Writer(s)	Recording	Length
1.	"Lookin' Up"	Hall	Studio	4:34
2.	"All the Things You Are"	Oscar Hammerstein II, Jerome Kern	Live	6:58
3.	"The Birds and the Bees"	Attila Zoller	Live	5:04
4.	"Improvisation, No. 1"		Studio	1:05
5.	"Falling Grace"	Steve Swallow	Studio	4:39
6.	"Ballad Z"	Metheny	Studio	4:33
7.	"Summertime"	George Gershwin, DuBose Heyward	Live	5:35
8.	"Farmer's Trust"	Metheny, Lyle Mays	Live	5:29
9.	"Cold Spring"	Hall	Live	6:29
10.	"Improvisation, No. 2"		Studio	1:11
11.	"Into the Dream"	Metheny	Studio	3:05
12.	"Don't Forget"	Metheny	Studio	4:46
13.	"Improvisation, No. 3"		Studio	3:22
14.	"Waiting to Dance"	Hall	Studio	4:38
15.	"Improvisation, No. 4"		Studio	2:37
16.	"Improvisation, No. 5"		Studio	2:08
17.	"All Across the City"	Hall	Live	7:34

- Jim Hall is featured on the left channel, Pat Metheny to the right.

== Personnel ==
- Jim Hall – electric guitar
- Pat Metheny – electric, acoustic, fretless acoustic, and 42-string Pikasso guitar

=== Technical personnel ===
- Pat Metheny, Gil Goldstein, Steve Rodby – producers
- Jay Newland – recording, mixing
- Ted Jensen – mastering at Sterling Sound, NYC, USA
- Anilda Carrasquillo – artwork
- Deborah Feingold – photography

== Charts ==
Year	Chart	Position
1999	Billboard Top Jazz Albums	2
