= I Can See Your House from Here (John Scofield and Pat Metheny album) =

I Can See Your House From Here

Studio album by John Scofield & Pat Metheny
- Released: April 5, 1994
- Recorded: December 1993
- Studio: Power Station, New York City
- Genre: Jazz, jazz fusion
- Length: 69:44
- Label: Blue Note
- Producer: Lee Townsend

John Scofield chronology
| What We Do (1993) | I Can See Your House From Here (1994) | Hand Jive (1994) |

Pat Metheny chronology
| Zero Tolerance for Silence (1994) | I Can See Your House from Here (1994) | We Live Here (1995) |

Professional ratings
Review scores
| Source | Rating |
|---|---|
| AllMusic | 4/5 stars |
| The Penguin Guide to Jazz Recordings | 3.5/4 stars |

I Can See Your House from Here is a 1994 jazz album by guitarists John Scofield and Pat Metheny. Scofield is heard on the left channel and Metheny on the right in this stereo recording. The band is rounded out by bass guitarist Steve Swallow and drummer Bill Stewart.

== Track listing ==
| No. | Title | Writer(s) | Length |
|---|---|---|---|
| 1. | "I Can See Your House from Here" | John Scofield | 7:43 |
| 2. | "The Red One" | Pat Metheny | 4:17 |
| 3. | "No Matter What" | John Scofield | 7:14 |
| 4. | "Everybody's Party" | John Scofield | 6:15 |
| 5. | "Message to My Friend" | Pat Metheny | 6:09 |
| 6. | "No Way Jose" | John Scofield | 7:18 |
| 7. | "Say the Brother's Name" | Pat Metheny | 7:18 |
| 8. | "S.C.O." | Pat Metheny | 4:41 |
| 9. | "Quiet Rising" | Pat Metheny | 5:26 |
| 10. | "One Way to Be" | John Scofield | 5:45 |
| 11. | "You Speak My Language" | John Scofield | 6:57 |

== Personnel ==
- John Scofield – electric guitar, acoustic guitar (left channel)
- Pat Metheny – electric guitar, nylon-string acoustic guitar, guitar synthesizer (right channel)
- Steve Swallow – electric bass, acoustic bass
- Bill Stewart – drums

=== Technical personnel ===
- Susan Scofield – executive producer
- Lee Townsend – producer
- James Farber – recording, mixing
- Rory Romano – assistant engineer
- Greg Calbi – mastering at Sterling Sound, NYC, USA
- Tony Gillis – mastering assistant
- Carolyn Chrzan – guitar technician
- Pat Metheny – cover interpretation
- Mark Larson – design
- Jan Staller – cover photography
- Jacques Lowe – session photography
