= New Chautauqua =

Studio album by Pat Metheny
- Released: March 1, 1979
- Recorded: August 1978
- Studio: Talent, Oslo, Norway
- Genre: Jazz fusion
- Length: 38:28
- Label: ECM
- Producer: Manfred Eicher

Pat Metheny chronology
Pat Metheny Group (1978)	New Chautauqua (1979)	American Garage (1979)

New Chautauqua is a solo album by jazz guitarist Pat Metheny, recorded in August 1978 and released on ECM in April 1979.

== Critical reception ==
Professional ratings
Review scores
Source	Rating
AllMusic	3/5 stars
DownBeat	3/5 stars
The Encyclopedia of Popular Music	4/5 stars
The Penguin Guide to Jazz Recordings	3/4 stars
Rolling Stone	(mixed)
The Rolling Stone Jazz Record Guide	2/5 stars

The Richmond Times-Dispatch wrote: "For all its delights, and they are considerable, Metheny's first solo venture is an exercise in arrangement and effect. As pure music, it drifts. The listener's attention does likewise."

== Track listing ==
All tracks are written by Pat Metheny.

Side one
No.	Title	Length
1.	"New Chautauqua"	5:19
2.	"Country Poem"	2:34
3.	"Long-Ago Child/Fallen Star"	10:19

Side two
No.	Title	Length
1.	"Hermitage"	5:39
2.	"Sueño con Mexico"	5:59
3.	"Daybreak"	8:38

== Personnel ==
- Pat Metheny – electric 6- and 12-string guitars, acoustic guitar, 15-string harp guitar, electric bass

Technical staff

- Manfred Eicher – producer
- Jan Erik Kongshaug – recording engineer
- Dieter Rehm – cover photography, design
- JoJi Sawa – back cover photography

== Charts ==
Year	Chart	Position
1979	Billboard Jazz Albums	3
1979	Billboard Pop Albums	44
