= American Garage =

Studio album by the Pat Metheny Group
- Released: November 1979
- Recorded: June 1979
- Studios: Long View Farm, North Brookfield, MA
- Genre: Jazz fusion
- Length: 35:21
- Label: ECM
- Producer: Pat Metheny

Pat Metheny chronology
New Chautauqua (1979)	American Garage (1979)	80/81 (1980)

Professional ratings
Review scores
Source	Rating
AllMusic	4.5/5 stars
The Encyclopedia of Popular Music	4/5 stars
The Penguin Guide to Jazz Recordings	3/4 stars
The Rolling Stone Jazz Record Guide	2/5 stars

American Garage is the second studio album by the Pat Metheny Group, recorded in June 1979 and released on ECM in November 1979. The quartet features rhythm section Lyle Mays, Mark Egan and Dan Gottlieb.

== Background ==
The album represented the most collaborative writing session between Pat Metheny and Lyle Mays up to that point in the band's history. According to Metheny, this yielded mixed results. He has said that the album's second track, "Airstream," is a favorite from this period. But both he and Mays have expressed less praise for the fifth and final track, "The Epic", which Metheny has claimed, "is all over the map."

== Track listing ==
All tracks are written by Pat Metheny and Lyle Mays.

Side I
No.	Title	Length
1.	"(Cross the) Heartland"	6:55
2.	"Airstream"	6:20
3.	"The Search"	4:54

Side II
No.	Title	Length
4.	"American Garage"	4:13
5.	"The Epic"	12:59

== Personnel ==
Pat Metheny Group

- Pat Metheny – 6-and 12-string electric and acoustic guitars
- Lyle Mays – piano, Oberheim synthesizer, autoharp, electric organ
- Mark Egan – bass
- Dan Gottlieb – drums

Technical personnel

- Pat Metheny – producer
- Manfred Eicher – executive producer
- Kent Nebergall – recording engineer, mixing engineer
- Jesse Henderson – assistant engineer
- Bill Kipper – mastering at Masterdisk, NYC, USA
- Basil Pao – design
- Joel Meyerowitz – cover photography
- Rob Van Petten – photography

== Charts ==
Chart (1980)	Peak position
Canada Top Albums/CDs (RPM)	88
US Billboard 200	53

== See also ==
- 1979 in jazz
