= Magic Labyrinth =

Studio album by Marc Johnson
- Released: 1995
- Recorded: June 1994
- Studio: Skyline Studios, NYC.
- Genre: Post-bop jazz
- Length: 50:28
- Label: JMT Productions
- Producer: Stefan Winter

Marc Johnson chronology
Right Brain Patrol (1992)	Magic Labyrinth (1995)	If Trees Could Fly (1999)

Magic Labyrinth is a studio album by jazz acoustic bassist Marc Johnson, and the second with his "Right Brain Patrol" trio featuring guitarist Wolfgang Muthspiel and percussionist Arto Tuncboyaciyan. It was released by JMT Productions (JMT 514 018-2) in 1995.

== Review ==
Downbeat praised the album for its "excursions to the more adventurous and angular regions of improvisational jazz".

Professional ratings
Review scores
Source	Rating
Allmusic	4/5 stars
The Penguin Guide to Jazz Recordings	3/4 stars
The Virgin Encyclopedia of Jazz	3/5 stars
Tom Hull	B+

== Reception ==
The Allmusic review by Rick Anderson awarded the album 4 stars.

== Track listing ==
No.	Title	Writer(s)	Length
1.	"Samurai Hee-Haw"	Johnson	7:34
2.	"J.P."	Tuncboyaciyan	8:31
3.	"Solar"	Miles Davis	3:17
4.	"A Paco"	Tuncboyaciyan	6:28
5.	"Forest Bower"	Johnson	2:56
6.	"Street Walk"	Tuncboyaciyan	3:57
7.	"Magic Labyrinth"	Muthspiel	5:31
8.	"Around That Time"	Muthspiel	5:25
9.	"Ne Um Talvez"	Hermeto Pascoal	6:55
Total length:			50:28

== Personnel ==
- Marc Johnson – upright bass
- Wolfgang Muthspiel – electric and acoustic guitars, guitar synthesizer
- Arto Tunçboyaciyan – percussions, vocals
