= Pat Metheny Group (album) =

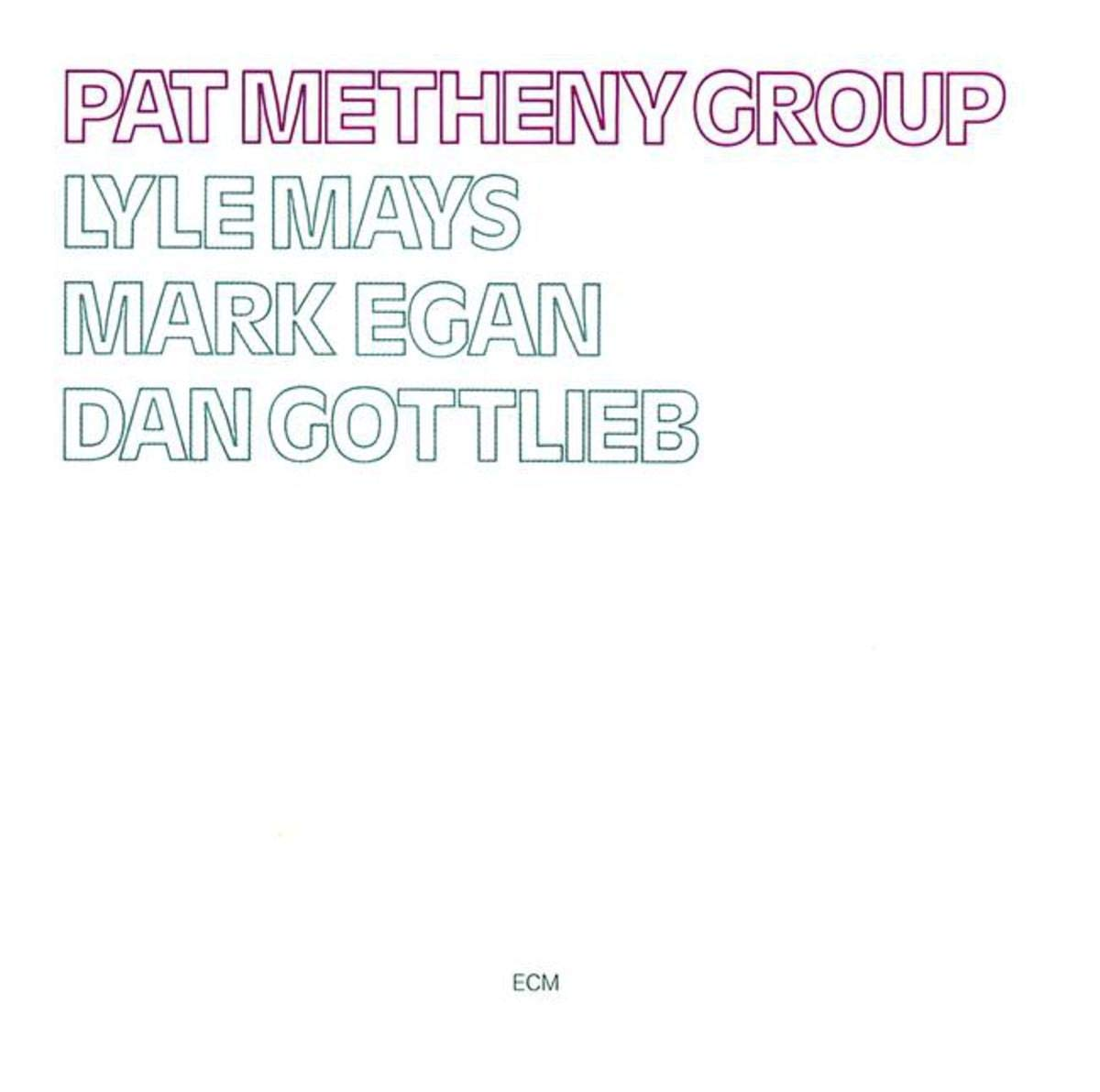

Studio album by the Pat Metheny Group
- Released: March 1978
- Recorded: January 1978
- Studio: Talent, Oslo, Norway
- Genre: Jazz fusion
- Length: 41:28
- Label: ECM
- Producer: Manfred Eicher

Pat Metheny chronology
| Watercolors (1977) | Pat Metheny Group (1978) | New Chautauqua (1979) |

Professional ratings
Review scores
| Source | Rating |
|---|---|
| All About Jazz | 4.5/5 stars |
| AllMusic | 5/5 stars |
| The Encyclopedia of Popular Music | 4/5 stars |
| The Penguin Guide to Jazz Recordings | 2.5/4 stars |
| The Rolling Stone Jazz Record Guide | 2/5 stars |

Pat Metheny Group is the debut album by the Pat Metheny Group, recorded in January 1978 and released on ECM in March that same year. The quartet features Lyle Mays, Mark Egan, and Danny Gottlieb.

== Composition and style ==
Many elements that became defining traits of the band's overall sound were in place on this album, namely Metheny's incorporation of several different guitars and Mays's fusion of electronic and acoustic keyboards to create a fuller, more harmonically sophisticated foundation for the melodies and solos. This is evidenced on "Phase Dance" where Metheny introduces the main melody on an acoustic guitar and then switches to electric to play one of the improvisational solos, with Mays providing the foundation on keyboards before playing the other solo. "Phase Dance" quickly became a signature song for the Group, most often played in concert as an introductory piece. "Jaco" is a tribute to Jaco Pastorius, who pioneered the fretless electric bass in jazz fusion.

== Track listing ==
All tracks are written by Pat Metheny, except as noted.

Side I
| No. | Title | Writer(s) | Length |
|---|---|---|---|
| 1. | "San Lorenzo" | Metheny; Mays | 10:14 |
| 2. | "Phase Dance" | Metheny; Mays | 8:18 |

Side II
| No. | Title | Writer(s) | Length |
|---|---|---|---|
| 1. | "Jaco" | | 5:34 |
| 2. | "Aprilwind" | | 2:09 |
| 3. | "April Joy" | | 8:14 |
| 4. | "Lone Jack" | Metheny; Mays | 6:41 |

== Personnel ==
Pat Metheny Group

- Pat Metheny – 6-and 12-string electric and acoustic guitars
- Lyle Mays – piano, Oberheim synthesizer, autoharp
- Mark Egan – bass
- Danny Gottlieb – drums

Technical personnel

- Manfred Eicher – producer
- Jan Erik Kongshaug – recording, mixing
- Allen Landau – mastering
- Roberto Masotti – photography
- Barbara Wojirsch – cover design

== Charts ==
| Year | Chart | Position |
|---|---|---|
| 1978 | Billboard Jazz Albums | 5 |
| 1978 | Billboard Pop Albums | 123 |
