= Pat Metheny =

American jazz guitarist and composer (born 1954)

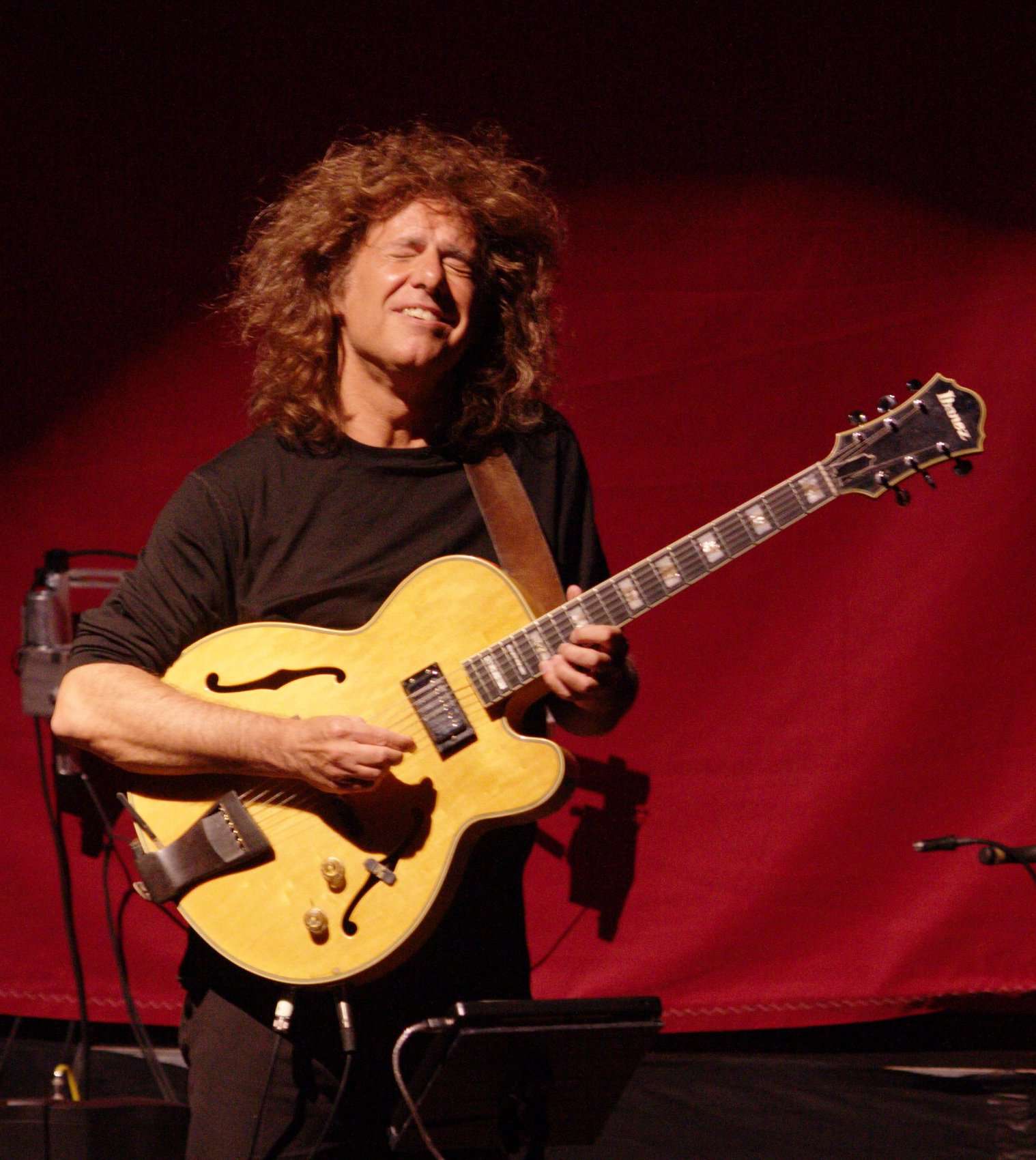
- Metheny in 2010

Background information
- Born: Patrick Bruce Metheny; August 12, 1954 (age 72); Lee's Summit, Missouri, U.S.
- Genres: Jazz; jazz fusion; Latin jazz; progressive jazz
- Occupations: Musician; composer; producer; professor
- Instruments: Guitar
- Years active: 1974–present
- Labels: ECM; Geffen; Warner; Nonesuch; Modern Recording
- Website: patmetheny.com

Patrick Bruce Metheny (/məˈθiːni/ məth-EE-nee; born August 12, 1954) is an American jazz guitarist and composer.

He was the leader of the Pat Metheny Group (1977–2010) and continues to work in various small-combo, duet, and solo settings, as well as other side projects. His style incorporates elements of progressive and contemporary jazz, Latin jazz, and jazz fusion. He has three gold albums and 20 Grammy Awards, and is the only person to have won Grammys in 10 categories.

== Biography ==
=== Early years and education ===
Metheny was born in Lee's Summit, Missouri. His father Dave played trumpet, his mother Lois sang, and his maternal grandfather Delmar was a professional trumpeter. Metheny's first instrument was the trumpet, which he was taught by his brother, Mike. Pat's brother, father, and grandfather played trios together at home. His parents were fans of Glenn Miller and swing music. They took Pat to concerts to hear Clark Terry and Doc Severinsen, but they had little respect for guitar. Pat's interest in guitar increased around 1964 when he saw the Beatles perform on TV. For his 12th birthday, his parents allowed him to buy a guitar, which was a Gibson ES-140 3/4.

Pat Metheny's life changed after hearing the album Four & More by Miles Davis. Soon after, he was captivated by Wes Montgomery's album Smokin' at the Half Note which was released in 1965. He cites the Beatles, Miles Davis, and Montgomery as having the biggest impact on his music.

When he was 15, Metheny won a scholarship from Down Beat magazine to a one-week jazz camp where he was mentored by guitarist Attila Zoller, who then invited him to New York City to meet guitarist Jim Hall and bassist Ron Carter.

While playing at a club in Kansas City, Metheny was approached by Bill Lee, a dean at the University of Miami, and offered a scholarship. After less than a week at college, Metheny realized that playing guitar all day during his teens had left him unprepared for classes. He admitted this to Lee, who offered him a job to teach as a professor, as the school had recently introduced electric guitar as a course of study.

He moved to Boston in the early 1970s to teach at the Berklee College of Music under the supervision of jazz vibraphonist Gary Burton and established a reputation as a prodigy.

=== Early recordings ===
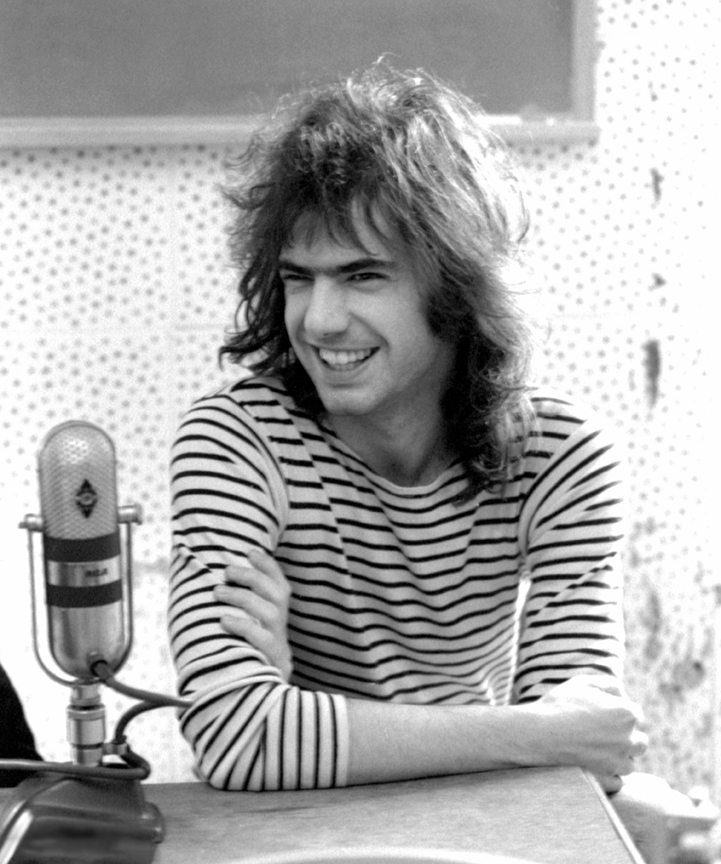
Metheny at KJAZ radio, Alameda, California, December 1980

In 1974, Metheny joined Burton's band alongside fellow guitarist Mick Goodrick, Steve Swallow and Eberhard Weber on bass, and percussionist Bob Moses. While Goodrick played 6-string electric guitar, Metheny introduced the electric 12-string guitar to the sound palette. He immediately appeared on Burton's studio recordings, from the 1974 Ring, Dreams So Real (1976), and Passengers in 1977. With Moses he had also a working trio that included their friend Jaco Pastorius on bass guitar.

In June 1974, he and Pastorius were in New York and took part in a session with pianist Paul Bley and Bruce Ditmas on drums, unaware that they were in an actual studio and were being recorded. An album with the material was released two years later on Bley's Improvising Artists label, unofficially titled Jaco.

For his debut album, Bright Size Life (1976), in December 1975 the trio flew to Europe and recorded the album during two days in Ludwigsburg (Germany) in one of the preferred studios of producer Manfred Eicher. Metheny and Moses had already been there in July for Gary Burton's Ring, also released through Eicher's label ECM. Initially they rehearsed the material for the recording with Dave Holland on bass, because Eicher refused to have an electric bass on the recording; but in the end he accepted Pastorius to play. According to Metheny, it was Burton, who was present in the studio for the trio recording and acted informally as their actual producer (without being credited).

His next album, Watercolors (ECM, 1977), was recorded with Eberhard Weber on bass and Danny Gottlieb on drums, and significantly marked Metheny's first outing with pianist Lyle Mays, who would become his key collaborator in forming the Pat Metheny Group later that year. With Mark Egan on bass, the lineup was set for the group's self-titled debut album, Pat Metheny Group (ECM, 1978).

== Pat Metheny Group ==
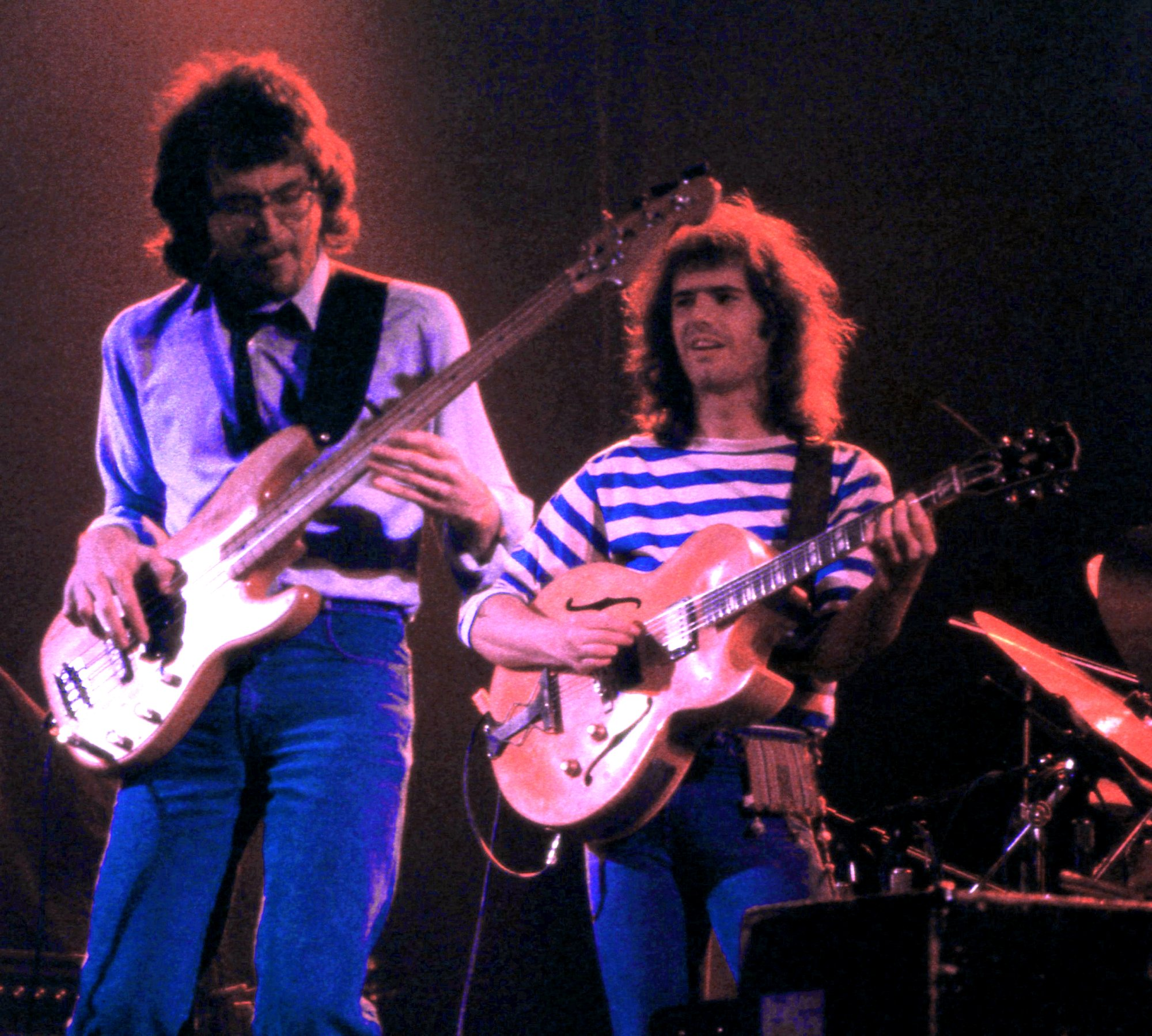
Left to right: Steve Rodby and Metheny

When Pat Metheny Group (ECM, 1978) was released, the group was a quartet comprising Metheny, Danny Gottlieb on drums, Mark Egan on bass, and Lyle Mays on piano, autoharp, and synthesizer. All but Egan had played on Metheny's album Watercolors (ECM, 1977), recorded the year before.

The second group album, American Garage (ECM, 1979), reached number 1 on the Billboard jazz chart and crossed over onto the pop charts. From 1982 to 1985, the Pat Metheny Group released Offramp (ECM, 1982), a live album, Travels (ECM, 1983), First Circle (ECM, 1984), and The Falcon and the Snowman a soundtrack album for the movie of the same name for which they collaborated on the single "This Is Not America" with David Bowie. The song reached number 14 in the British Top 40 in 1985 and number 32 in the U.S.

Offramp marked the first appearance of bassist Steve Rodby (replacing Egan) and a Brazilian guest artist, Nana Vasconcelos, on percussion and wordless vocals. On First Circle, Argentinian singer and multi-instrumentalist Pedro Aznar joined the group; as drummer, Paul Wertico replaced Gottlieb.

First Circle was Metheny's last album with ECM; he had been a key artist for the European record label but left following disagreements with the label's founder, Manfred Eicher.

Still Life (Talking) (Geffen, 1987) featured new group members: trumpeter Mark Ledford, vocalist David Blamires, and percussionist Armando Marçal. Aznar returned for vocals and guitar on Letter from Home (Geffen, 1989).

With Metheny working on multiple projects, it was four years before the release of the next group record, a live album titled The Road to You (Geffen, 1993). This release featured live versions of tracks from the two Geffen studio albums as well as previously unreleased tunes.

With Speaking of Now (Warner Bros., 2002), new group members were added: drummer Antonio Sánchez from Mexico City, Vietnamese-American trumpeter Cuong Vu, and bassist, vocalist, guitarist, and percussionist Richard Bona from Cameroon.

On The Way Up (Nonesuch, 2005), harmonica player Grégoire Maret from Switzerland was introduced as a new group member, while Bona contributed as a guest musician. The album consists of a single 68-minute-long piece—split into four sections—based on a three-note motif: the opening B, A♯, F♯, and its later variation F♯, A, B.

== Solo releases ==
Metheny has recorded albums under his solo artist billing regularly throughout his career. His solo acoustic guitar albums include New Chautauqua (ECM, 1979), One Quiet Night (Warner Bros., 2003), and What's It All About (Nonesuch, 2011).

Building on the work of his experimental quartets, Metheny further explored fringes of the avant-garde on Zero Tolerance for Silence (Geffen, 1994), a solo electric guitar outing.

For the album Orchestrion (Nonesuch, 2010) Metheny hand-crafted an array of elaborate, custom mechanical instruments which allowed him to compose and perform as a one-person orchestra. By contrast, his album Secret Story (Geffen, 1992) uses lush orchestral arrangements usually found in movie soundtracks, such as The Falcon and the Snowman (EMI, 1985) and his own A Map of the World (Warner Bros., 1999) film soundtrack.

Recent solo-billed recordings include From This Place (Nonesuch, 2020), recorded with a variety of guest artists, and the all-guitar collaboration Road to the Sun (Modern Recordings, 2021).

== Unity Band ==
In 2012, Metheny formed the Unity Band with Antonio Sánchez on drums, Ben Williams on bass and Chris Potter on saxophone. This quartet released the album Unity Band (Nonesuch, 2012) and toured Europe and the U.S. during the latter half of the year. In 2013, as an extension of the Unity Band project, Metheny announced the formation of the Pat Metheny Unity Group, with the addition of the Italian multi-instrumentalist Giulio Carmassi.

== Side projects ==
Outside the Group, Metheny has shown different sides of his musical personality. An early duo billing with Lyle Mays, As Falls Wichita, So Falls Wichita Falls (ECM, 1981), includes Brazilian percussionist and vocalist Naná Vasconcelos for an elegant set noted for its atmospheric, long-form title track. In 1983, Metheny and Mays wrote music for the Steppenwolf Theater Company's production of Lyle Kessler's play Orphans. It has remained special optional music for productions of the play around the world since.

Metheny ventured into experimental jazz with the quartet releases 80/81 (ECM, 1980), Song X (Geffen, 1986) with Ornette Coleman, and The Sign of 4 headed by Derek Bailey (Knitting Factory Works, 1997).

In 1997, Metheny recorded with bassist Marc Johnson on Johnson's release The Sound of Summer Running (Verve, 1998). The next year, he recorded a guitar duet with Jim Hall (Telarc, 1999), whose work has strongly influenced Metheny's. He collaborated with Polish jazz and folk singer Anna Maria Jopek on Upojenie (Warner Poland, 2002) and Bruce Hornsby on Hot House (RCA, 2005). He has also played on albums by his older brother, Mike Metheny, a jazz trumpeter, among them Day In – Night Out (1986) and Close Enough for Love (2001).

== Influences ==
As a young guitarist, Metheny tried to sound like Wes Montgomery, but when he was 14 or 15, he decided it was disrespectful to imitate him. In the liner notes on the 2-disc Montgomery compilation Impressions: The Verve Jazz Sides, Metheny is quoted as saying, "Smokin' at the Half Note is the absolute greatest jazz-guitar album ever made. It is also the record that taught me how to play."

Ornette Coleman's 1968 album New York Is Now! inspired Metheny to find his own direction. He has recorded Coleman's compositions on a number of albums, starting with a medley of "Round Trip" and "Broadway Blues" on his debut album, Bright Size Life (1976). He worked extensively with Coleman's collaborators, such as Charlie Haden, Dewey Redman, and Billy Higgins, and he recorded the album Song X (1986) with Coleman and toured with him.

Metheny made three albums on ECM with Brazilian vocalist and percussionist Naná Vasconcelos. He lived in Brazil from the late 1980s to the early 1990s and performed with several local musicians, such as Milton Nascimento and Toninho Horta. He played with Antônio Carlos Jobim as a tribute, in a live performance in Carnegie Hall Salutes The Jazz Masters: Verve 50th Anniversary.

He is also a fan of several pop music artists, especially singer/songwriters including James Taylor (after whom he named the song "James" on Offramp); Bruce Hornsby, Cheap Trick, and Joni Mitchell, with whom he performed on her Shadows and Light (Asylum/Elektra, 1980) live tour. Metheny is also fond of Buckethead's music. He also worked with, sponsored or helped to make recordings of singer/songwriters from all over the world, such as Pedro Aznar (Argentina), Akiko Yano (Japan), David Bowie (UK), Silje Nergaard (Norway), Noa (Israel), and Anna Maria Jopek (Poland).

Three of Metheny's albums, Secret Story (1992), The Way Up (2005) and Orchestrion (2010), show the influence of American minimalist composer Steve Reich, with rhythmic figures structured around a recurring pulse. Decades earlier, Metheny had appeared on Reich's album Different Trains (Nonesuch, 1987) performing Reich's composition, Electric Counterpoint.

== Guitars ==
=== Hollow-body electric guitars ===
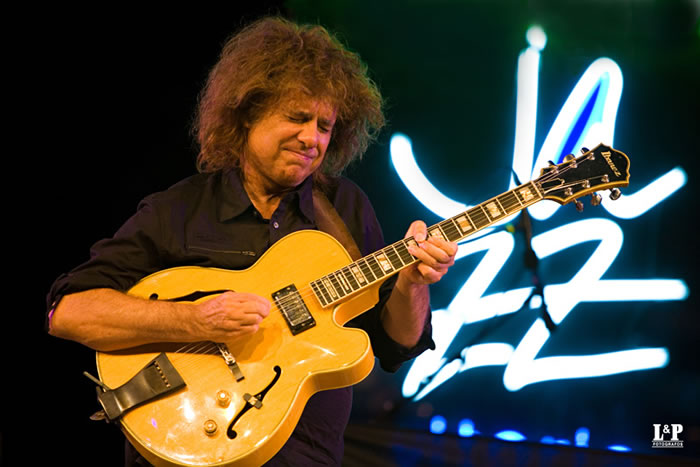
Metheny with his Ibanez PM signature model

At the age of 12, Metheny bought a natural finish Gibson ES-175 that he played throughout his early career, until it was retired in 1995. After his first tour of Japan in 1978, he began an association with Ibanez guitars, who have since produced a range of PM signature models.

=== Six-string and twelve-string electric ===
Metheny was an early proponent of the twelve-string guitar in jazz. During his 1975 tour with the Gary Burton "Quartet" (actually a quintet), he primarily played electric twelve-string guitar against the six-string work of resident guitarist Mick Goodrick.

Prior to Metheny, Pat Martino had used the electric twelve-string guitar on a studio album, Desperado, and John McLaughlin had used a double-neck electric guitar with the Mahavishnu Orchestra. Ralph Towner was perhaps the first to use acoustic twelve-string guitar extensively in jazz.

=== Guitar synthesizer ===
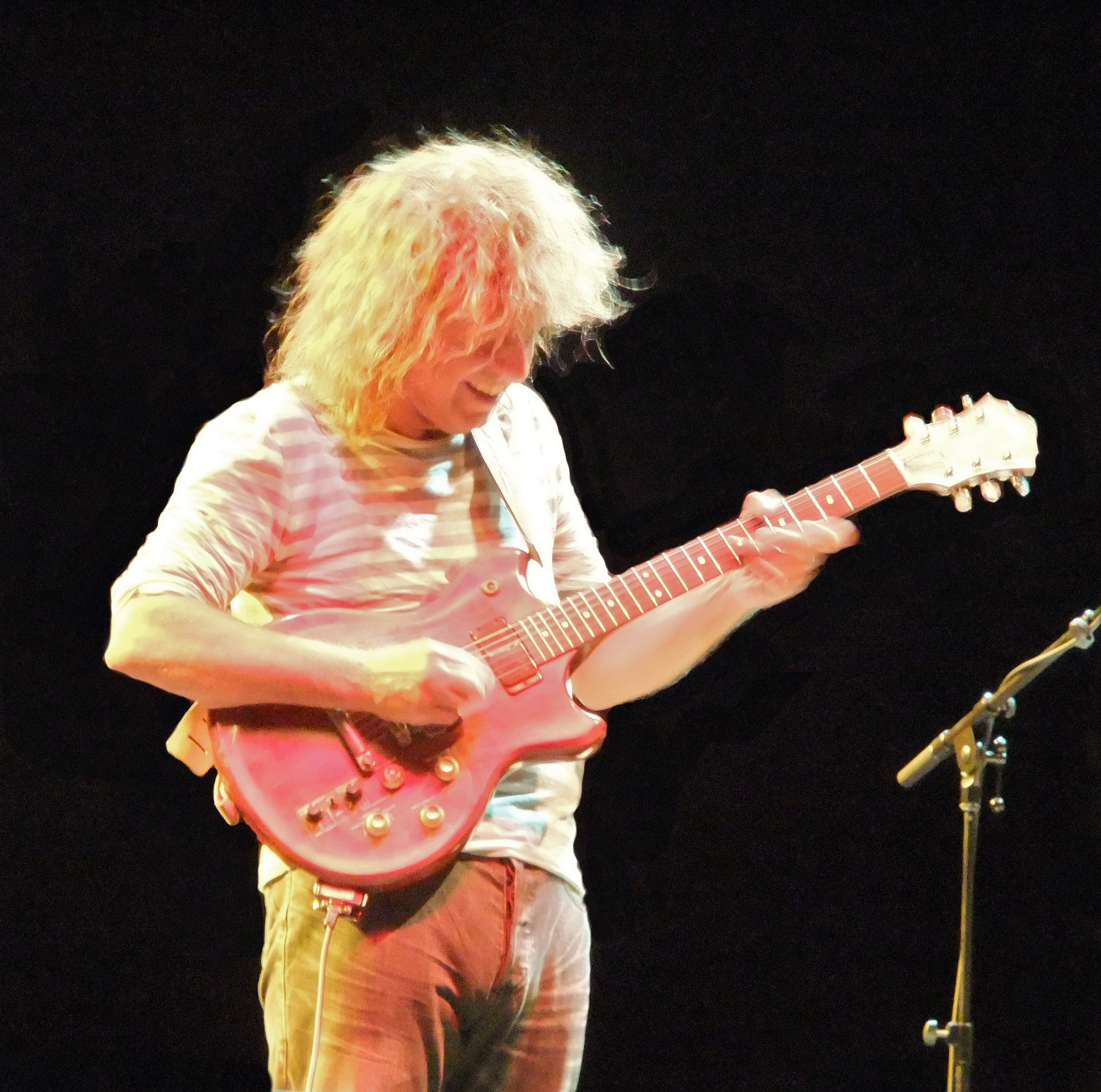
Metheny with the guitar synthesizer

Metheny was one of the first jazz guitarists to use the Roland GR-300 guitar synthesizer. He commented, "you have to stop thinking about it as a guitar, because it no longer is a guitar." He approaches it as if he were a horn player, and he prefers the "high trumpet" sound of the instrument. In addition to the Roland, he uses a Synclavier controller.

=== Pikasso ===
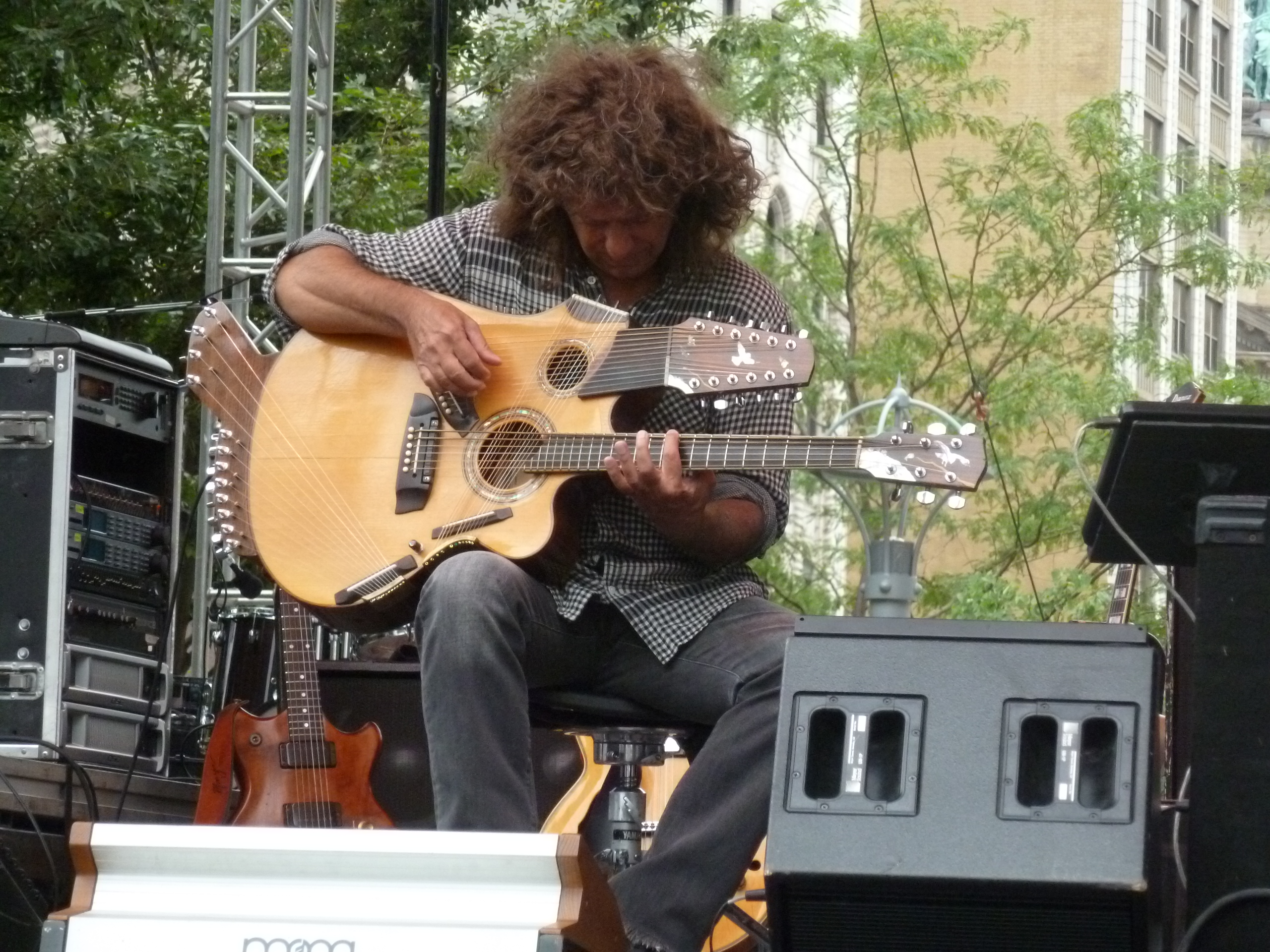
Metheny with the 42-string Pikasso

Metheny plays a custom-made 42-string Pikasso I created by Canadian luthier Linda Manzer. He plays it on "Into the Dream" and on the albums Quartet (1996), Imaginary Day (1997), Jim Hall & Pat Metheny (1999), Trio → Live (Warner Bros., 2000), and the Speaking of Now Live and Imaginary Day Live DVDs. Metheny has used the guitar in his guest appearances on other artists' albums. He used the Pikasso on Metheny/Mehldau Quartet (Nonesuch, 2007), his second collaboration with pianist Brad Mehldau and his trio sidemen Larry Grenadier and Jeff Ballard; the Pikasso is featured on Metheny's composition "The Sound of Water". Manzer has made many acoustic guitars for Metheny, including a mini guitar, an acoustic sitar guitar, and the baritone guitar, which Metheny used for the recording of One Quiet Night (2003).

== Personal life ==
Metheny is the younger brother of jazz flugelhornist Mike Metheny. He lives in New York City with his wife, Latifa (née Azhar), and three children. Latifa has been credited for album photography.

Metheny was once in a relationship with Sônia Braga.

== Awards and honors ==
=== Grammy Awards ===
Pat Metheny is the only person to have won Grammy Awards in ten different categories.

Year	Category	Title	Note
2013	Best Jazz Instrumental Album	Unity Band	With the Unity Band
2012	Best New Age Album	What's It All About	
2008	Best Jazz Instrumental Album	Pilgrimage	(Won as producer)
2006	Best Contemporary Jazz Album	The Way Up	Pat Metheny Group
2004	Best New Age Album	One Quiet Night	
2003	Best Contemporary Jazz Album	Speaking of Now	Pat Metheny Group
2001	Best Jazz Instrumental Solo	"(Go) Get It"	(Won as soloist)
2000	Best Jazz Instrumental Performance	Like Minds	With Chick Corea, Dave Holland, Gary Burton, Roy Haynes
1999	Best Rock Instrumental Performance	"The Roots of Coincidence"	Pat Metheny Group
1999	Best Contemporary Jazz Performance	Imaginary Day	Pat Metheny Group
1998	Best Jazz Instrumental Performance	Beyond the Missouri Sky	With Charlie Haden
1996	Best Contemporary Jazz Performance	We Live Here	Pat Metheny Group
1994	Best Contemporary Jazz Performance	The Road to You	Pat Metheny Group
1993	Best Contemporary Jazz Performance	Secret Story	
1991	Best Instrumental Composition	"Change of Heart"	(Won as composer)
1990	Best Jazz Fusion Performance	Letter from Home	Pat Metheny Group
1988	Best Jazz Fusion Performance	Still Life (Talking)	Pat Metheny Group
1985	Best Jazz Fusion Performance	First Circle	Pat Metheny Group
1984	Best Jazz Fusion Performance	Travels	Pat Metheny Group
1983	Best Jazz Fusion Performance	Offramp	Pat Metheny Group

=== Additional awards ===
Partial list of other (non-Grammy) awards and honors for Pat Metheny:

- DownBeat Hall of Fame, 2013
- Miles Davis Award, Montreal International Jazz Festival, 1995
- Orville H. Gibson Award, 1996
- Honorary Doctorate of Music from Berklee College of Music, 1996
- Guitarist of the Year, DownBeat Readers' Poll, 1983, 1986–1991, 2007–2016
- Best Jazz Guitarist, Guitar Player magazine, 1982, 1983, 1986
- Best Jazz Guitarist, Guitar Player magazine Readers' Poll, 1984, 1985, 2009
- Best Acoustic Guitarist, Acoustic Guitar magazine Readers' Poll, 2009
- Echo Award for Best Guitar Instrumentalist – International for TAP: John Zorn's Book of Angels Vol. 20, 2014
- Echo Award, International Ensemble of the Year, Kin, 2015
- Missouri Music Hall of Fame, 2016
- Lifetime Achievement Award, JazzFM, 2018
- Elected into Royal Swedish Academy of Music, 2018
- 2018 NEA Jazz Masters, 2017
- Honorary Doctorate of Music from McGill University, 2019

== Discography ==
- Bright Size Life (ECM, 1976) – rec. 1975
- Watercolors (ECM, 1977)
- Pat Metheny Group (ECM, 1978)
- New Chautauqua (ECM, 1979) – rec. 1978
- American Garage (ECM, 1979)
- 80/81 (ECM, 1980)
- As Falls Wichita, So Falls Wichita Falls with Lyle Mays (ECM, 1981) – rec. 1980
- Offramp (ECM, 1982) – rec. 1981
- Travels (ECM, 1983) – live rec. 1982
- Rejoicing (ECM, 1984) – rec. 1983
- First Circle (ECM, 1984)
- The Falcon and the Snowman (EMI, 1985) – soundtrack rec. 1984
- Song X with Ornette Coleman (Geffen, 1986) – rec. 1985
- Still Life (Talking) (Geffen, 1987)
- Letter from Home (Geffen, 1989)
- Question and Answer (Geffen, 1990) – rec. 1989
- Secret Story (Geffen, 1992)
- Flower Hour (Beech Master, 1992) – live rec. 1990
- The Road to You (Geffen, 1993) – live rec. 1991
- Zero Tolerance for Silence (Geffen, 1994) – rec. 1992
- I Can See Your House from Here with John Scofield (Blue Note, 1994)
- We Live Here (Geffen, 1995) – rec. 1994
- Quartet (Geffen, 1996)
- Passaggio per il paradiso (MCA, 1996) – soundtrack
- Beyond the Missouri Sky (Short Stories) with Charlie Haden (Verve, 1997)
- Imaginary Day (Warner Bros., 1997)
- Like Minds (Concord Jazz, 1998) – rec. 1997
- Jim Hall & Pat Metheny (Telarc, 1999) – rec. 1998
- A Map of the World (Warner Bros., 1999) – soundtrack
- Trio 99 → 00 (Warner Bros., 2000)
- Trio → Live (Warner Bros., 2000)
- Speaking of Now (Warner Bros., 2002)
- One Quiet Night (Warner Bros., 2003)
- The Way Up (Nonesuch, 2005) – rec. 2003–04
- Metheny/Mehldau (Nonesuch, 2006)
- Metheny Mehldau Quartet (Nonesuch, 2007)
- Day Trip (Nonesuch, 2008)
- Tokyo Day Trip (Nonesuch, 2008) – live
- Upojenie with Anna Maria Jopek (Nonesuch, 2008)
- Quartet Live with Gary Burton (Concord Jazz, 2009)
- Orchestrion (Nonesuch, 2010)
- What's It All About (Nonesuch, 2011)
- Unity Band with Chris Potter (Nonesuch, 2012)
- The Orchestrion Project (Nonesuch, 2013) – live
- Tap: Book of Angels Volume 20 (Tzadik/Nonesuch, 2013)
- KIN (←→) (Nonesuch, 2014)
- Hommage à Eberhard Weber (ECM, 2015) – live
- The Unity Sessions (Nonesuch, 2016) – live
- Cuong Vu Trio Meets Pat Metheny (Nonesuch, 2016)
- From This Place (Nonesuch, 2020)
- Road to the Sun (Modern Recordings, 2021)
- Side-Eye NYC (V1.IV) (Modern Recordings, 2021) – live rec. 2019
- Dream Box (Modern Recordings, 2023)
- MoonDial (Modern Recordings, 2024)
- Side-Eye III+ (Uniquity Music, 2026)

== Collaborators ==
The following is a partial list of Metheny's notable collaborators:

- Lyle Mays
- Bill Frisell
- Billy Higgins
- Brad Mehldau
- Charlie Haden
- Chick Corea
- Dave Holland
- Dewey Redman
- Eberhard Weber
- Herbie Hancock
- Jack DeJohnette
- Jaco Pastorius
- Jim Hall
- John Scofield
- Joni Mitchell
- David Bowie
- Joshua Redman
- Marc Johnson
- Michael Brecker
- Mick Goodrick
- Roy Haynes
- Steve Swallow
- Tony Williams
- Steve Rodby

== See also ==
- List of American Grammy Award winners and nominees
