= Zero Tolerance for Silence =

Studio album by Pat Metheny
- Released: 1994
- Recorded: December 16, 1992
- Studios: Power Station, New York City
- Genres: Avant-garde jazz, free improvisation, noise rock
- Length: 39:14
- Label: Geffen
- Producer: Pat Metheny

Pat Metheny chronology
The Road to You (1993)	Zero Tolerance for Silence (1994)	I Can See Your House from Here (1994)

Professional ratings
Review scores
Source	Rating
AllMusic	1.5/5 stars
Robert Christgau	(dud)
The Encyclopedia of Popular Music	1/5 stars
Entertainment Weekly	B−
The New York Times	unfavorable
Tom Hull	B−

Zero Tolerance for Silence is a studio album by American jazz guitarist Pat Metheny that was released by Geffen Records label in 1994. The album was recorded in one day and consists of improvised, solo electric guitar.

== Background and reception ==
Tim Griggs of AllMusic called it "semi-organized noise."

Griggs has two theories about the album's origins. The first is that Metheny was upset with Geffen, and as his contract was ending, this was his way of expressing his displeasure. In 2008, Metheny said,

That rumor was started by a journalist who was seriously not listening to the album. All it would have taken was a quick phone call [to me] to find out that that wasn't the case. Besides, I would never do something like that. It isn't the way I operate, which I think has been pretty self-evident over the years. That record speaks for itself in its own musical terms. To me, it is a 2-D view of a world in which I am usually functioning in a more 3-D way. It is entirely flat music, and that was exactly what it was intended to be.

Griggs's second theory is that Metheny simply made the kind of album he wanted to make. At All About Jazz, one critic called it "the album no one seems to understand."

The cover of Zero Tolerance for Silence carried an endorsement by Thurston Moore, guitarist for Sonic Youth, who called the album "an incendiary work by an unpredictable master." Critics have been less kind. Ben Watson of the music magazine The Wire called it "rubbish".

== Track listing ==
All tracks are credited to Pat Metheny.

No.	Title	Length
1.	"Part 1"	18:32
2.	"Part 2"	5:17
3.	"Part 3"	4:19
4.	"Part 4"	5:13
5.	"Part 5"	5:53
Total length:		39:14

== Personnel ==
- Pat Metheny – electric guitar

=== Technical staff ===
- Pat Metheny – producer
- Ben Fowler – recording, mixing
- Scott Austin – assistant engineer
- Ted Jensen – mastering
- Dennis Keeley – photography
- Kevin Reagan – design
