= Secret Story (album) =

Studio album by Pat Metheny
- Released: July 1992
- Recorded: Fall 1991 – Winter 1992
- Studios: Power Station, New York City
- Genres: Jazz, jazz fusion, world music, world fusion
- Length: 76:11
- Label: Geffen
- Producer: Pat Metheny

Pat Metheny chronology
Question and Answer (1990)	Secret Story (1992)	The Road to You (1993)

Professional ratings
Review scores
Source	Rating
AllMusic	4.5/5 stars
The Encyclopedia of Popular Music	5/5 stars
The Penguin Guide to Jazz Recordings	2/4 stars

Secret Story is an album by Pat Metheny, released in 1992. It won the Grammy Award for Best Contemporary Jazz Album in 1993.

All of the music is composed by Metheny (shared credit on one track), and it is one of his most ambitious studio ventures, integrating elements of jazz, rock, and world music. On the performing side, it includes contributions from the Pinpeat Orchestra of the Royal Ballet of Cambodia, the London Orchestra and its conductor Jeremy Lubbock, the Choir of the Cambodian Royal Palace, and jazz harmonica player Toots Thielemans. Longtime Metheny collaborator Lyle Mays plays piano on two tracks.

== Background ==
The opening song, "Above the Treetops", is an adaptation of a Cambodian spiritual song. Japanese pianist and singer Akiko Yano appears on "As a Flower Blossoms", earning the only co-writing credit on the album. Yano had previously collaborated with Metheny on her 1991 album Love Life. Orchestral arrangements for the album were conducted by Jeremy Lubbock.

Metheny took Secret Story on a concert tour, and a video recording of a live performance at New Brunswick, New Jersey, was issued. This film, also called Secret Story, was re-released on DVD in 2001.

The album was certified Gold by the RIAA on December 1, 1995.

== Remaster ==
In September 2007, the album was released again with noticeably retouched mixes and a bonus CD of five previously unreleased tracks from the same sessions. The remaster was issued on WEA and Nonesuch Records.

== Track listing ==
All tracks are written by Pat Metheny except where noted.

No.	Title	Length
1.	"Above the Treetops"	2:43
2.	"Facing West"	6:05
3.	"Cathedral in a Suitcase"	4:52
4.	"Finding and Believing"	10:00
5.	"The Longest Summer"	6:34
6.	"Sunlight"	3:53
7.	"Rain River"	7:09
8.	"Always and Forever"	5:26
9.	"See the World"	4:48
10.	"As a Flower Blossoms (I Am Running to You)" (Pat Metheny/Akiko Yano)	1:53
11.	"Antonia"	6:11
12.	"The Truth Will Always Be"	9:15
13.	"Tell Her You Saw Me"	5:11
14.	"Not to Be Forgotten (Our Final Hour)"	2:22

Note

- Bonus CD of the 2007 Deluxe Edition reissue. The numbering for bonus disc tracks 2–4 in the booklet and on the packaging is wrong. The tracklist below is as the music is presented on disc.

All music is composed by Pat Metheny.

No.	Title	Length
1.	"Back in Time"	5:22
2.	"Look Ahead"	4:05
3.	"Understanding"	2:14
4.	"A Change in Circumstance"	1:19
5.	"Et si c’était la fin (As If It Were the End)"	3:40

== Personnel ==
- Pat Metheny – guitars, bass guitar, keyboards (all tracks)
- Armando Marçal – percussion (tracks 1–7, 9, 12, 16)
- Steve Rodby – double bass, bass guitar (tracks 4–7, 9, 11, 16)
- Paul Wertico – drums (tracks 4–5, 7–9, 11, 16)
- Naná Vasconcelos – percussion (tracks 1, 4–5, and 10–12), voice (track 11)
- Steve Ferrone – drums (tracks 3–5, and 12)
- Will Lee – bass guitar (tracks 4, 6, 12, 19)
- Gil Goldstein – accordion (tracks 4, 7, and 9)
- Lyle Mays – piano (tracks 2 and 6)
- Toots Thielemans – harmonica (tracks 8, 11, and 15)
- Charlie Haden – double bass (tracks 1, 8, and 15)
- Mark Ledford – vocals (tracks 3–4, and 16)
- Danny Gottlieb – cymbal roll, percussion (tracks 3 and 11)
- Skaila Kanga – harp (track 13 and 17)
- Sammy Merendino – drums (track 6)
- Andy Findon – flute (track 7)
- Ryan Kisor – trumpet, flugelhorn (track 9)
- Mike Metheny – trumpet, flugelhorn (track 9)
- Michael Mossman – trumpet, flugelhorn (track 9)
- Dave Bargeron – trombone, tuba (track 9)
- Tom Malone – trombone (track 9)
- Dave Taylor – bass trombone (track 9)
- John Clark – French horn (track 9)
- Anthony Jackson – contrabass guitar (track 9)
- Akiko Yano – vocals (track 10)
- Paulo Braga – drums (track 19)

== Technical ==
- Pat Metheny – producer
- Steve Rodby, David Oakes – co-producers
- Mastered by Ted Jensen
- Recorded 1991–92 at the Power Station, New York City
- Orchestra recorded at Abbey Road Studio One, London, UK

== Certifications ==
Region	Certification	Certified units/sales
United States (RIAA)	Gold	500,000^{^}
^{^} Shipments figures based on certification alone.

== Awards ==
Grammy Awards

Year	Category
1993	Grammy Award for Best Contemporary Jazz Album
