= Rob Eaton =

American singer-songwriter

- Born: Robert Eaton; Mount Kisco, New York
- Genres: Folk rock, jam, bluegrass, country rock, jazz
- Occupations: Musician, singer-songwriter
- Instruments: guitar, vocals
- Years active: 1980–present
- Member of: Dark Star Orchestra

Rob Eaton is an American guitarist. He is best known for his work with the renowned Grateful Dead tribute band, Dark Star Orchestra, of which he has been a member since 2001.

== Career ==
Rob Eaton grew up in Vermont and was inspired to start playing guitar at the age of 12 after hearing the Grateful Dead's Europe '72. He joined his first band, The Peyote Ridge, in 1975 which played a combination of originals and Dead covers.

Eaton has been a member of the Grateful Dead community since the 1970s and used to tape shows. This led to him moving to New York in 1980 and getting a job in the recording industry at the Power Station recording studio. Around the same time he began playing with the Dead cover band Border Legion. He continued gigging with them until 2001 when he was offered a permanent position in Dark Star Orchestra, playing the part of Bob Weir. Since then he began putting most of his time into performing with that band as well as his new side project, Sages and Spirits. He has also produced albums for Pat Metheny and appeared as a guest on other albums such as Peter Wolf's Sleepless.

Betty Cantor-Jackson, a longtime recording engineer for the Grateful Dead in the 1970s and early 1980s, made high quality reel to reel recordings of many Grateful Dead shows. They are colloquially known as Betty Boards as many were direct feeds from the soundboard. Thousands of recordings were sold to three anonymous buyers in 1986 in a storage locker foreclosure auction. In 2014, one of those buyers asked Eaton to begin restoring and digitizing the old, sometimes moldy or disintegrating magnetic tapes. Eaton felt the work so important as, in many cases, these were the best if not the only recordings of the performances. He eventually tracked down and convinced the other two buyers to allow him to do the same.
