= 1957–58 Heart of Midlothian F.C. season =

Heart of Midlothian
1957–58 season
- Manager: Tommy Walker
- Stadium: Tynecastle Park
- Scottish First Division: 1st
- Scottish Cup: Round 3
- League Cup: Group Stage

During the 1957–58 season Hearts competed in the Scottish First Division, the Scottish Cup, the Scottish League Cup and the East of Scotland Shield.

== Fixtures ==
=== Friendlies ===
7 October 1957 Friendly	Hearts	2–4	Hibernian	Tynecastle Park
	Goal

14 October 1957 Friendly	Bolton Wanderers	1–1	Hearts	Burnden Park
	Goal

30 October 1957 Friendly	Norwich City	3–4	Hearts	Carrow Road
	Goal

4 November 1957 Friendly	Hearts	3–5	Manchester City	Tynecastle Park
	Goal

20 November 1957 Friendly	Hearts	2–2	Newcastle United	Tynecastle Park
	Goal

27 November 1957 Friendly	Newcastle United	2–0	Hearts	St James' Park
	Goal

2 December 1957 Friendly	Hearts	3–5	British Army	Tynecastle Park
	Goal

3 March 1958 Friendly	Hearts	3–2	Scotland XI	Tynecastle Park
	Goal

23 April 1958 Friendly	Hearts	3–1	British Army	Tynecastle Park
	Goal

23 May 1958 Tour	Ontario All Stars	0–6	Hearts	Varsity Stadium Toronto
	Goal

25 May 1958 Tour	Hearts	6–5	Manchester City	Ebbets Field, New York
	Goal

28 May 1958 Tour	Manitoba All Stars	2–13	Hearts	Alexander Park, Winnipeg
	Goal

31 May 1958 Tour	Hearts	3–5	Manchester City	Empire Stadium, Vancouver
	Goal

2 June 1958 Tour	British Columbia All Stars	1–4	Hearts	Empire Stadium, Vancouver
	Goal

4 June 1958 Tour	Alberta All Stars	2–13	Hearts	Renfrew Park, Edmonton
	Goal

7 June 1958 Tour	Hearts	1–7	Manchester City	Varsity Stadium, Toronto
	Goal

9 June 1958 Tour	Northern All Stars	0–10	Hearts	Sudbury
	Goal

11 June 1958 Tour	Hearts	6–0	Manchester City	Percival Molson Stadium, Montreal
	Goal

=== League Cup ===
10 August 1957 League Cup Group	Kilmarnock	2–1	Hearts	Rugby Park
				Attendance: 19,806

14 August 1957 League Cup Group	Hearts	9–2	Queen's Park	Tynecastle Park
				Attendance: 20,000

20 August 1957 League Cup Group	Dundee	2–2	Hearts	Dens Park
				Attendance: 16,200

24 August 1957 League Cup Group	Hearts	1–1	Kilmarnock	Tynecastle Park
				Attendance: 25,000

28 August 1957 League Cup Group	Queen's Park	0–0	Hearts	Hampden Park
				Attendance: 6,849

31 August 1957 League Cup Group	Hearts	4–2	Dundee	Tynecastle Park
				Attendance: 18,000

=== Scottish Cup ===
1 February 1958 Scottish Cup R1	East Fife	1–2	Hearts	Bayview Park
				Attendance: 13,750

15 February 1958 Scottish Cup R2	Hearts	4–1	Albion Rovers	Tynecastle Park
				Attendance: 23,451

1 March 1958 Scottish Cup R3	Hearts	3–4	Hibernian	Tynecastle Park
				Attendance: 41,666

=== Scottish First Division ===
7 September 1957 Scottish First Division	Hearts	6–0	Dundee	Tynecastle Park
				Attendance: 19,700

14 September 1957 Scottish First Division	Airdrieonians	2–7	Hearts	Broomfield Park
				Attendance: 14,000

21 September 1957 Scottish First Division	Hearts	3–1	Hibernian	Tynecastle Park
				Attendance: 34,000

5 October 1957 Scottish First Division	Hearts	9–0	East Fife	Tynecastle Park
				Attendance: 28,000

12 October 1957 Scottish First Division	Third Lanark	0–0	Hearts	Cathkin Park
				Attendance: 19,000

19 October 1957 Scottish First Division	Hearts	4–0	Aberdeen	Tynecastle Park
				Attendance: 35,000

26 October 1957 Scottish First Division	Rangers	2–3	Hearts	Ibrox Park
				Attendance: 62,000

2 November 1957 Scottish First Division	Hearts	2–2	Motherwell	Tynecastle Park
				Attendance: 30,000

9 November 1957 Scottish First Division	Queen of the South	1–4	Hearts	Palmerston Park
				Attendance: 9,500

11 November 1957 Scottish First Division	Partick Thistle	1–3	Hearts	Firhill Park
				Attendance: 17,000

16 November 1957 Scottish First Division	Hearts	8–0	Queen's Park	Tynecastle Park
				Attendance: 20,000

23 November 1957 Scottish First Division	Clyde	2–1	Hearts	Shawfield Stadium
				Attendance: 18,000

30 November 1957 Scottish First Division	Hearts	9–1	Falkirk	Tynecastle Park
				Attendance: 25,000

7 December 1957 Scottish First Division	Raith Rovers	0–3	Hearts	Stark's Park
				Attendance: 21,000

14 December 1957 Scottish First Division	Hearts	2–1	Kilmarnock	Tynecastle Park
				Attendance: 24,000

21 December 1957 Scottish First Division	Hearts	5–1	St Mirren	Tynecastle Park
				Attendance: 18,000

28 December 1957 Scottish First Division	Celtic	0–2	Hearts	Celtic Park
				Attendance: 43,000

1 January 1958 Scottish First Division	Hibernian	0–2	Hearts	Easter Road
				Attendance: 49,200

2 January 1958 Scottish First Division	Hearts	4–0	Airdrieonians	Tynecastle Park
				Attendance: 19,000

4 January 1958 Scottish First Division	Dundee	0–5	Hearts	Dens Park
				Attendance: 23,000

11 January 1958 Scottish First Division	Hearts	4–1	Partick Thistle	Tynecastle Park
				Attendance: 22,000

18 January 1958 Scottish First Division	East Fife	1–2	Hearts	Bayview Park
				Attendance: 10,000

25 January 1958 Scottish First Division	Hearts	7–2	Third Lanark	Tynecastle Park
				Attendance: 17,000

22 February 1958 Scottish First Division	Motherwell	0–4	Hearts	Fir Park
				Attendance: 20,000

8 March 1958 Scottish First Division	Queen's Park	0–4	Hearts	Hampden Park
				Attendance: 8,232

10 March 1958 Scottish First Division	Hearts	3–1	Queen of the South	Tynecastle Park
				Attendance: 11,000

14 March 1958 Scottish First Division	Hearts	5–3	Celtic	Tynecastle Park
				Attendance: 35,000

19 March 1958 Scottish First Division	Hearts	2–2	Clyde	Tynecastle Park
				Attendance: 34,000

22 March 1958 Scottish First Division	Falkirk	0–4	Hearts	Brockville Park
				Attendance: 18,000

29 March 1958 Scottish First Division	Hearts	4–1	Raith Rovers	Tynecastle Park
				Attendance: 9,000

5 April 1958 Scottish First Division	Kilmarnock	1–1	Hearts	Rugby Park
				Attendance: 15,865

12 April 1958 Scottish First Division	St Mirren	2–3	Hearts	St Mirren Park, Love Street
				Attendance: 22,000

16 April 1958 Scottish First Division	Aberdeen	0–4	Hearts	Pittodrie Park
				Attendance: 12,000

30 April 1958 Scottish First Division	Hearts	2–1	Rangers	Tynecastle Park
				Attendance: 30,000

== See also ==
- List of Heart of Midlothian F.C. seasons
