= 1957–58 Celtic F.C. season =

Celtic
1957–58 season
- Manager: Jimmy McGrory
- Stadium: Celtic Park
- Scottish Division One: 3rd
- Scottish Cup: Third round
- Scottish League Cup: Winners

During the 1957–58 Scottish football season, Celtic competed in Scottish Division One.

== Competitions ==
=== Scottish Division One ===
==== League table ====
Pos	Team	Pld	W	D	L	GF	GA	GR	Pts
1	Heart of Midlothian	34	29	4	1	132	29	4.552	62
2	Rangers	34	22	5	7	89	49	1.816	49
3	Celtic	34	19	8	7	84	47	1.787	46
4	Clyde	34	18	6	10	84	61	1.377	42
5	Kilmarnock	34	14	9	11	60	55	1.091	37

Source: RSSSF

==== Matches ====
7 September 1957 Division One	Falkirk	0–1	Celtic	Falkirk
15:00 GMT				Stadium: Brockville Park; Attendance: 13,000

21 September 1957 Division One	Rangers	2–3	Celtic	Glasgow
15:00				Stadium: Ibrox Park; Attendance: 60,000

12 October 1957 Division One	Celtic	1–1	Raith Rovers	Glasgow
15:00				Stadium: Celtic Park; Attendance: 20,000

26 October 1957 Division One	Third Lanark	0–2	Celtic	Glasgow
15:00 GMT				Stadium: Cathkin Park; Attendance: 24,000

2 November 1957 Division One	Celtic	4–0	Kilmarnock	Glasgow
14:45 BST				Stadium: Celtic Park; Attendance: 33,915

9 November 1957 Division One	East Fife	0–3	Celtic	Methil
15:00 BST				Stadium: Bayview Park; Attendance: 9,000

16 November 1957 Division One	Celtic	2–2	St Mirren	Glasgow
14:30 BST				Stadium: Celtic Park; Attendance: 30,000

23 November 1957 Division One	Hibernian	0–1	Celtic	Edinburgh
15:00 BST				Stadium: Easter Road; Attendance: 40,000

30 November 1957 Division One	Airdrieonians	2–5	Celtic	Airdrie
15:00 BST				Stadium: Broomfield Park; Attendance: 22,000

7 December 1957 Division One	Celtic	0–0	Dundee	Glasgow
14:15 GMT				Stadium: Celtic Park; Attendance: 12,000

14 December 1957 Division One	Clyde	3–6	Celtic	Glasgow
15:00 GMT				Stadium: Shawfield Stadium; Attendance: 26,500

21 December 1957 Division One	Celtic	2–3	Partick Thistle	Glasgow
14:15 GMT				Stadium: Celtic Park; Attendance: 22,000

25 December 1957 Division One	Celtic	1–2	Queen of the South	Glasgow
12:00 GMT				Stadium: Celtic Park; Attendance: 15,000

28 December 1957 Division One	Celtic	0–2	Hearts	Glasgow
14:15 GMT				Stadium: Celtic Park; Attendance: 43,000

1 January 1958 Division One	Celtic	0–1	Rangers	Glasgow
14:00 GMT				Stadium: Celtic Park; Attendance: 50,000

2 January 1958 Division One	Queen's Park	0–3	Celtic	Glasgow
14:15 GMT				Stadium: Hampden Park; Attendance: 8,341

4 January 1958 Division One	Celtic	2–2	Falkirk	Glasgow
14:15 GMT				Stadium: Celtic Park; Attendance: 18,000

11 January 1958 Division One	Motherwell	1–3	Celtic	Motherwell
14:30 GMT				Stadium: Fir Park; Attendance: 19,000

18 January 1958 Division One	Celtic	1–1	Aberdeen	Glasgow
14:45 GMT				Stadium: Celtic Park; Attendance: 18,000

25 January 1959 Division One	Raith Rovers	1–2	Celtic	Kirkcaldy
15:00 GMT				Stadium: Stark's Park; Attendance: 10,000

22 February 1958 Division One	Kilmarnock	1–1	Celtic	Kilmarnock
15:00 GMT				Stadium: Rugby Park; Attendance: 21,897

5 March 1958 Division One	Celtic	4–0	East Fife	Glasgow
16:15 GMT				Stadium: Celtic Park; Attendance: 4,000

8 March 1958 Division One	St Mirren	1–1	Celtic	Paisley
15:00 GMT				Stadium: St Mirren Park, Love Street; Attendance: 12,000

14 March 1958 Division One	Hearts	5–3	Celtic	Edinburgh
19:30 GMT				Stadium: Tynecastle Park; Attendance: 35,000

19 March 1958 Division One	Celtic	4–0	Hibernian	Glasgow
15:00 GMT				Stadium: Celtic Park; Attendance: 4,000

22 March 1958 Division One	Celtic	4–2	Airdrieonians	Glasgow
17:00 GMT				Stadium: Celtic Park; Attendance: 16,000

29 March 1958 Division One	Dundee	5–3	Celtic	Dundee
15:00 GMT				Stadium: Dens Park; Attendance: 20,000

5 April 1958 Division One	Aberdeen	0–1	Celtic	Aberdeen
15:00 GMT				Stadium: Pittodrie Park; Attendance: 13,000

7 April 1958 Division One	Celtic	5–1	Queen's Park	Glasgow
17:00 BST				Stadium: Celtic Park; Attendance: 4,000

9 April 1958 Division One	Celtic	6–2	Clyde	Glasgow
17:30 GMT				Stadium: Celtic Park; Attendance: 5,000

12 April 1958 Division One	Partick Thistle	0–1	Celtic	Glasgow
15:00 BST				Stadium: Firhill Park; Attendance: 26,000

16 April 1958 Division One	Queen of the South	4–3	Celtic	Dumfries
19:30 BST				Stadium: Palmerston Park; Attendance: 7,000

21 April 1958 Division One	Celtic	2–2	Motherwell	Glasgow
19:00 BST				Stadium: Celtic Park; Attendance: 5,000

30 April 1958 Division One	Celtic	4–1	Third Lanark	Glasgow
19:00 BST				Stadium: Celtic Park; Attendance: 4,000

=== Scottish Cup ===
1 February 1958 First round	Airdrieonians	3–4	Celtic	Airdrie
15:00 GMT				Stadium: Broomfield Park; Attendance: 26,000

15 February 1958 Second round	Celtic	7–2	Stirling Albion	Glasgow
15:00 GMT				Stadium: Celtic Park; Attendance: 30,200

1 March 1958 Third round	Clyde	2–0	Celtic	Glasgow
15:00 GMT				Stadium: Celtic Park; Attendance: 65,000

=== Scottish League Cup ===
10 August 1957 Group 8	Celtic	3–2	Airdireonians	Glasgow
15:00 GMT				Stadium: Celtic Park; Attendance: 38,000

14 August 1957 Group 8	East Fife	1–4	Celtic	Methil
19:00 GMT				Stadium: Bayview Park; Attendance: 10,000

17 August 1957 Group 8	Hibernian	3–1	Celtic	Edinburgh
15:00 GMT				Stadium: Easter Road; Attendance: 35,000

24 August 1957 Group 8	Airdrieonians	1–2	Celtic	Airdrie
15:00 GMT				Stadium: Broomfield Park; Attendance: 16,000

28 August 1957 Group 8	Celtic	6–1	East Fife	Glasgow
18:45 GMT				Stadium: Celtic Park; Attendance: 18,000

31 August 1957 Group 8	Celtic	2–0	Hibernian	Glasgow
15:00 GMT				Stadium: Celtic Park; Attendance: 50,000

11 September 1957 Quarter-final 1st leg	Celtic	6–1	Third Lanark	Glasgow
18:15 GMT				Stadium: Celtic Park; Attendance: 20,000

14 September 1957 Quarter-final 2nd leg	Third Lanark	0–3	Celtic	Glasgow
15:00 GMT				Stadium: Cathkin Park; Attendance: 18,000

28 September 1957 Semi-final	Celtic	4–2	Clyde	Glasgow
15:00 GMT				Stadium: Ibrox Park; Attendance: 42,000

19 October 1957 Final	Celtic	7–1	Rangers	Glasgow
14:45 GMT				Stadium: Hampden Park; Attendance: 90,185
