= Willie MacFarlane (footballer, born 1930) =

Scottish footballer and manager

Willie Macfarlane
Personal information
- Date of birth: 17 March 1930
- Place of birth: Leith, Scotland
- Date of death: 11 March 2010 (aged 79)
- Position: Defender

Senior career*
Years	Team	Apps	(Gls)
1953–1958	Hibernian	78	(2)
1958–1961	Raith Rovers	36	(1)
1961	Morton	6	(0)
Total		120	(3)

Managerial career
- 1967–1968: Hawick Royal Albert
- 1968–1969: Stirling Albion
- 1969–1970: Hibernian
- 1978–1980: Meadowbank Thistle
- * Club domestic league appearances and goals

Willie MacFarlane (17 March 1930 – 11 March 2010) was a Scottish football player and manager who played for and managed Hibernian.

== Early life and playing career ==
MacFarlane played as a full–back for Hibernian in the 1950s, when the club featured the forward line known as The Famous Five. He was born in Leith and brought up in the same area (Hutchison) as goalkeeper Tommy Younger, with whom he played for Hutchison Vale and the Army. Both players were then signed for Hibs by manager Hugh Shaw. He was taken by Hibs on a tour of Brazil in 1953 to play in three games in the Maracana stadium against Vasco da Gama, Botafogo and Fluminense. MacFarlane also played for Hibs in the first season of the European Cup, playing in five of the six matches possible. Hibs eventually lost to Stade Reims in the semi-final, where MacFarlane was pitted against Raymond Kopa.

Former teammate Tommy Preston described MacFarlane as "resolute", "strong" and capable of striking a good free kick.

MacFarlane played for Raith Rovers and Morton later in his playing career.

== Managerial career and later life ==
MacFarlane began his managerial career with East of Scotland League club Hawick Royal Albert. He joined Stirling Albion in March 1968, before taking a similar post at Hibernian in 1969. Chairman William Harrower appointed MacFarlane to replace Bob Shankly, who had resigned. Despite suffering early exits in the two cup competitions, Hibs qualified for the Inter-Cities Fairs Cup by finishing third in the Scottish League. During that first season, MacFarlane's team set a club record for consecutive wins. Hibs beat Malmö and Vitória de Guimarães to progress to the third round of the Fairs Cup, where they would lose to Bill Shankly's Liverpool side. That tie with Liverpool led to MacFarlane's departure from Hibs. Chairman Tom Hart, who had just bought the club from Harrower, overruled him on team selection and sacked MacFarlane prior to the match.

MacFarlane "oversaw the early stages of one of the finest ever Hibernian sides". Having signed Erich Schaedler in his previous managerial post at Stirling Albion, MacFarlane made Schaedler his first signing as Hibs manager. He moved John Brownlie from playing in central defence to an attacking full back role, an "inspirational" choice. Having sold Peter Marinello to Arsenal for a record transfer fee, MacFarlane then signed Falkirk player Johnny Graham, who scored a hat-trick in his first game. He also signed Arthur Duncan, who went on to set the record for most league appearances for Hibs. Former player John Fraser, who worked as a coach for MacFarlane, described him as an "enthusiastic" manager, who established a good rapport with his players.

After leaving Hibs, MacFarlane had a spell as manager of Meadowbank Thistle between 1978 and 1980. MacFarlane also ran a bookmakers business in Edinburgh and regularly attended matches at Easter Road. He was also a keen golf player and karaoke singer. MacFarlane died in hospital on the morning of 11 March 2010, after a "short illness".
