= Gerald Toto =

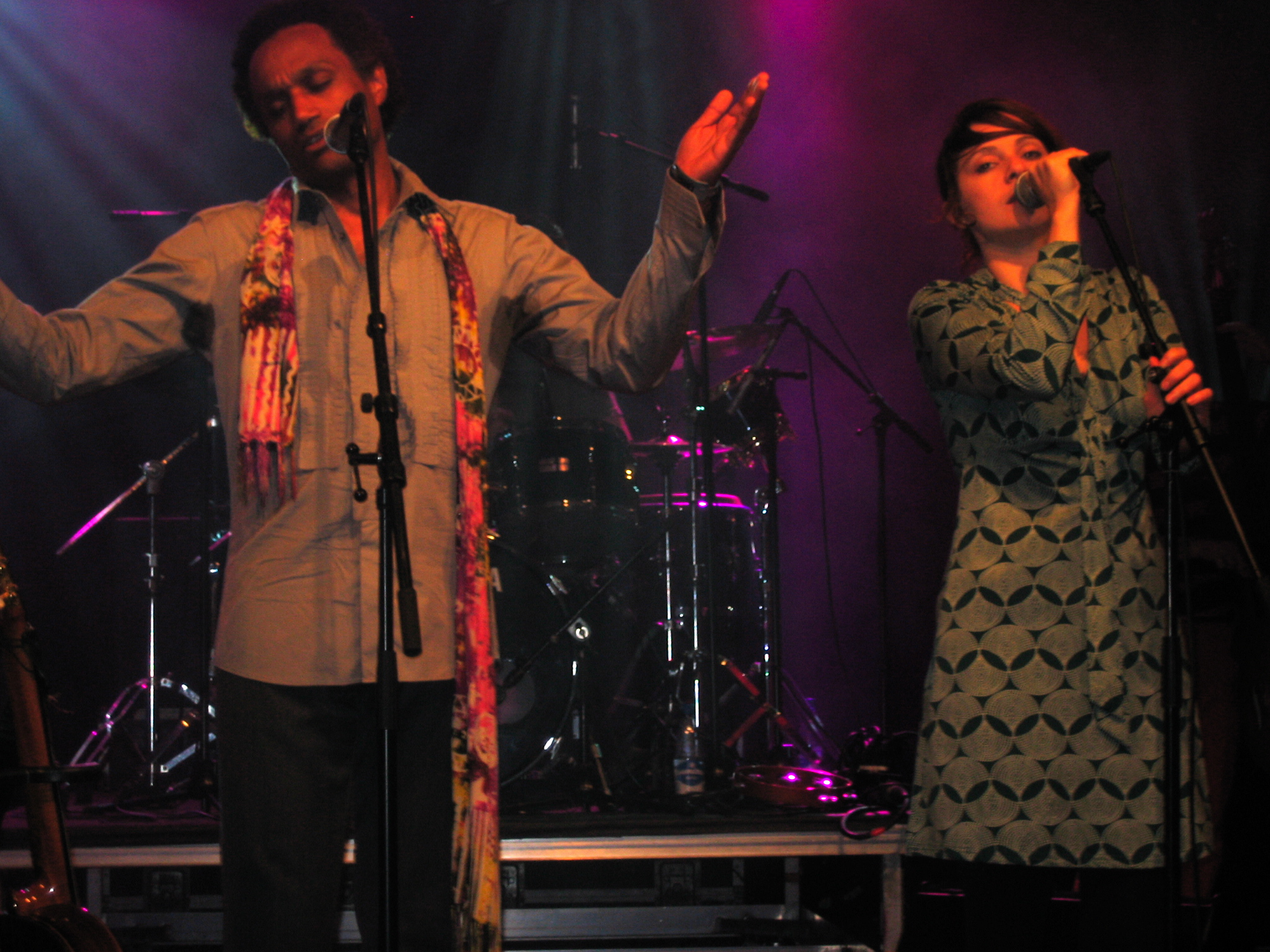
- Toto singing with Nouvelle Vague at Le Grand Rex theater in Paris in 2007

Background information
- Born: 1967 (age 57–58); Saint-Cloud, France
- Genres: Chanson
- Occupations: Singer, songwriter
- Labels: WEA, V2
- Website: http://www.geraldtoto.net

Gerald Toto (born 1967) is a French lyricist, composer, performer, multi-instrumentalist and artistic director.

== Career ==
Toto was born, Saint-Cloud, France. Part of the underground scene in the middle of the 1990s, he chose a new direction by becoming the artistic director and composer of the first album of the well known Faudel (writing songs such as "Tellement je t'aime")

On the heels of the commercial success Gerald Toto released his first album, Les Premiers Jours (Warner, 1998), a mix between cashew music and the music of Daniel Lanois.

Then came Middle Eastern electro with the band Smadj and the vocal improvisations of "Toto Bona Lokua" with Richard Bona and Lokua Kanza (No Format!, 2004).

In 2006 Toto came back with a new album, Kitchenette (V2music). He also contributed to Nouvelle Vague's album Bande à Part (Peacefrog, 2006), for which he did the covers "Don't Go" and "Heart of Glass".

His third album, Spring Fruits, with English lyrics, was released in 2011.

== Discography ==
- Les Premiers Jours (1998)
1. Les Premiers Jours
2. Y’en a qui
3. Mademoiselle
4. Bonne nuit
5. Libellules
6. Le vrai sauvage
7. If 6 was 9
8. Une scène d’amitié
9. Et si
10. Je nous aime
11. L’éléphant
12. Ta peau me manque
13. La mélopée
- Toto Bona Lokua (2004)
1. Ghana Blues (Richard Bona)
2. Kwalelo (Richard Bona)
3. Lamuka (Lokua Kanza)
4. L’endormie (Gérald Toto)
5. Flutes (Gérald Toto)
6. The front (Richard Bona)
7. Na ye (Lokua Kanza)
8. Help me (Gérald Toto)
9. Stesuff (Lokua Kanza)
10. Where i came from (Gérald Toto)
11. Seven beats (Richard Bona)
12. Lisanga (Lokua Kanza)
- Kitchenette (2007)
1. Par temps calme (Gérald Toto)
2. Tes dessous (Gérald Toto / Gérald Toto – Mike Clinton – Jérôme Boirivant)
3. Isabelle in love & pain (Gérald Toto / Gérald Toto – Paul Borg)
4. En rose ou violet (Gérald Toto)
5. Mamie Chatrou (Gérald Toto)
6. Les copines (Gérald Toto)
7. Buisson dormant (Gérald Toto)
8. No man's land (Gérald Toto)
9. L’eau martienne (Gérald Toto / Gérald Toto – Paul Borg)
10. J’fais (Gérald Toto)
11. Au cas où (Gérald Toto)
12. Tears at the end (David Parker / Gérald Toto)
13. Secrets culinaires (Gérald Toto)
- [BONUS Kitchenette: Le Dessert]

CD Bonus's name is "Le dessert" :

1. Sa nou Pe fe 3:52
2. Et Si 3:32
3. Sa nou Pe fe – Version Flutes 3:23
4. Buisson Dormant – Version Concert 4:39
5. Eau Martienne – Version Acoustique 3:28
6. Boulangerie 9:02
7. EPK + Clip Sa Nou Pe Fe 30:51
- Spring Fruits (2011)

with Alice Orpheus, Janice Leca, Mike Pelanconi, Patrick Goraguer

1. Chocolate Cake 4:19
2. Freedom 4:30
3. My Child 4:42
4. Killing Time 4:40
5. Dive 3:13
6. I Easily Get Lost 3:45
7. On Your Own 2:39
8. It's A Need 3:31
9. Mister Postman 3:10
10. Black Mary 3:21
11. I Have To Admit It 2:21
12. No Words 4:01
