= Kyrie Kristmanson =

Canadian singer-songwriter, guitarist and trumpeter (born 1989 or 1990)

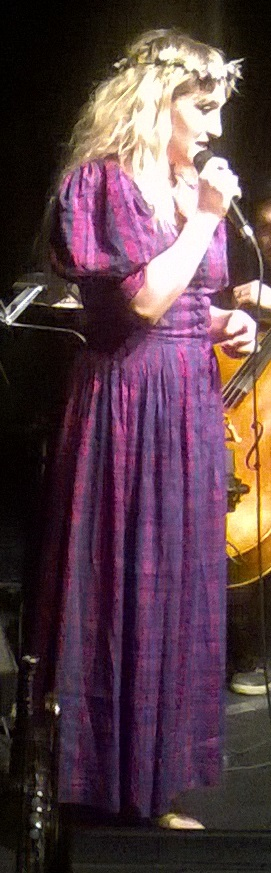
- Kristmanson in 2017

Background information
- Born: 1989 or 1990 (age 35–36); Ottawa, Ontario, Canada
- Genres: Jazz, folk, classical
- Occupation(s): Singer-songwriter, poet
- Instrument(s): Vocals, guitar, trumpet
- Labels: No Format!

Kyrie Kristmanson (born 1989 or 1990) is a Canadian singer-songwriter, guitarist and trumpeter. Born in Ottawa, Ontario, she has lived in Ontario, Quebec, New Brunswick, Saskatchewan and in France. Since appearing at the 2006 Winnipeg Folk Festival at the age of fifteen, Kristmanson has performed widely in Canada and Europe. Her performances have been broadcast nationally in Canada by CBC Radio 2, and in France by Radio France and by France Inter ("White Sessions").

She received a B.Hum. Honours degree in humanities and music from Carleton University in 2010.

== Musical career ==
She has released three albums as a solo artist, incorporating jazz, folk and classical influences into her musical style. She performs in English and French, and has toured widely in France since launching her third album Origin of Stars (No Format!/Universal, 2010) at the Eglise Saint-Eustache in Paris. She began her ongoing research of troubadour music and poetry, and particularly the female medieval troubadour tradition, during a year spent studying at the Lumière University Lyon 2. Her poetry chapbook Myths of the Body was published by In/Words Magazine and Press in September 2008, and she has contributed texts to Jowi Taylor's Six String Nation (Douglas and MacInyre, 2009) and Folk Prints magazine.

She was commissioned to write songs for CBC programs including A Continent Ago, inspired by writer Mavis Gallant, created for Canada Reads. She also contributed two songs, "Land" and "Talk", to Sound and Inspiration II, a show in which the Art of Time Ensemble performed Robert Schumann's "Piano Quintet in E flat", followed by pop and rock musicians – including Kristmanson, John Southworth, Justin Rutledge, Martin Tielli, Dave Wall and Andy Maize — performing their own original compositions inspired by the Schumann piece. In 2010, she collaborated with composer Pat Carrabré and the Afiara String Quartet on The Domna Elegies, a song cycle in which Kristmanson's troubadour-inspired songs and poetry were set to chamber music arrangements by Carrabré.

Kristmanson has opened for notable performers such as Feist (performing with Melissa Laveaux), Emily Loizeau, Sophie Hunger, Hawksley Workman and Buck 65. She was also a founding member of the indie rock band Rah Rah. She was selected to perform at the Canadian Music Café at the Toronto International Film Festival in 2008 and at South by South-East in Memphis, Tennessee.

Kristmanson plays a classical guitar created for her by Lyon-based luthier Jasper Senderowitz.

== Awards ==
In 2007, Kristmanson won the Canadian Folk Music Award for Best Young Performer. In 2009 she was awarded the Colleen Peterson Songwriting Award for her composition "Song X".

== Discography ==
- The Kyrie K Groove (2006)
- Pagan Love (2008)
- Origin of Stars (2010)
- "Thundersongs EP" (2011)
