= John Coyle =

John Coyle may refer to:

- John Coyle (footballer) (1932–2016), Scottish footballer
- John Coyle (speed skater) (born 1968), American short track speedskater
