= Toto Bona Lokua =

Studio album by Gerald Toto, Richard Bona and Lokua Kanza
- Released: April 20, 2004
- Genre: Jazz, world music
- Label: No Format!

Gerald Toto chronology
Les Premiers Jours (1998)	Toto Bona Lokua (2004)	Kitchenette (2007)

Richard Bona chronology
Munia (The Tale) (2003)	Toto Bona Lokua (2004)	Tiki (2006)

Lokua Kanza chronology
Toyebi Te (2002)	Toto Bona Lokua (2004)	Plus Vivant (2005)

Professional ratings
Review scores
Source	Rating
AllMusic	3.5/5 stars

Toto Bona Lokua is a studio album by French songwriter and multi-instrumentalist Gerald Toto, Cameroonian jazz musician Richard Bona, and Congolese singer-songwriter Lokua Kanza. It was released on April 20, 2004 through No Format!.

== Track listing ==
All tracks are written by Gerald Toto, Richard Bona and Lokua Kanza, except where noted

No.	Title	Writer(s)	Length
1.	"Ghana Blues"	Gerald Glombard, Lokua Kanza, Richard Bona	3:03
2.	"Kwalelo"	Gerald Glombard, Lokua Kanza, Richard Bona	4:14
3.	"Lamuka"		2:44
4.	"L'endormie"	Gerald Toto	2:36
5.	"Flutes"		2:52
6.	"The Front"	Richard Bona	0:21
7.	"Na Ye"		3:35
8.	"Help Me"		3:28
9.	"Stesuff"	Lokua Kanza	1:18
10.	"Where I Came From"		3:31
11.	"Seven Beats"		1:42
12.	"Lisanga"		6:48

== Chart performance ==
Chart (2013)	Peak position
US Top World Albums (Billboard)	6
