= Julia Sarr =

- Born: Dakar, Senegal
- Citizenship: Senegalese
- Occupations: Singer, Songwriter
- Years active: 1990s–present
- Known for: Mezzo-soprano vocalist; collaborations with Youssou N'Dour, Lokua Kanza, Patrice Larose
- Notable work: Set Luna (with Patrice Larose, 2005); Njaboot (solo album)

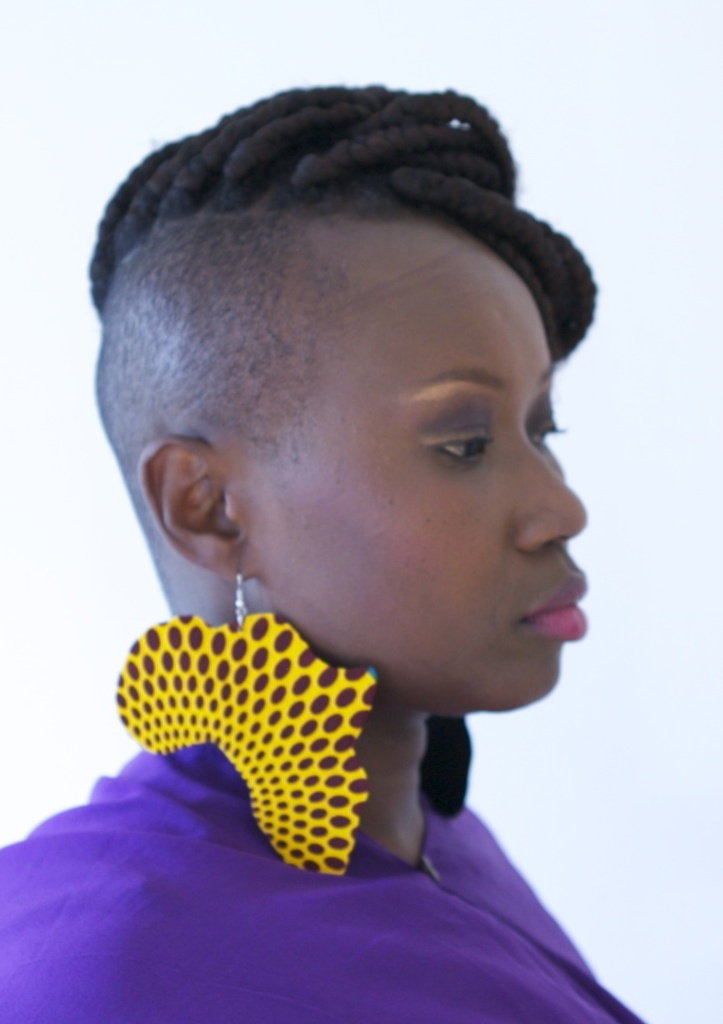
Julia Sarr (2018)

Julia Sarr is a Mezzo-soprano born in Dakar (Senegal) from the Serer ethnic group. As one of the most sought after backing vocalists, she has worked with several prominent artists over the years including Youssou N'Dour, Lokua Kanza and Patrice Larose.

== Career ==
Julia launched her singing career based on West Africa's polyrhythmic signatures rooted in her Serer heritage with Fela Kuti (Fela Anikulapo Kuti) who was a Nigerian multi-instrumentalist musician and composer as well as the pioneer of Afrobeat music.

Julia became one of the most requested backing vocalists in Paris where she has lived for over twenty years working with artists like Jean-Jacques Goldman, Michel Fugain, MC Solaar, Julio Iglesias and the Senegalese singer Youssou N’Dour.

For several years, Julia Sarr had shared the stage and studio with the Congolese singer, songwriter, guitarist and producer Lokua Kanza. She has also worked with Jean-Claude Petit (the French composer and arranger) singing in a cappella in his score for Raoul Peck's film Lumumba (2010) starring Eriq Ebouaney.

After nurturing her solo aspirations and songwriting quietly for years, Julia partnered with Patrice Larose, a flamenco-inspired French guitarist with whom she has released an album titled "Set Luna" (on the No Format! and Universal Jazz labels in Europe and on the boutique label Sunnyside Records in the United States). "Set Luna", from the Wolof language translates to "So I’ve Observed" which they performed in the United States at the Carnegie Hall on 24 October 2005 to great reviews.
