= The Ten Shades of Blues =

Studio album by Richard Bona
- Released: October 19, 2009
- Genre: Jazz, blues, world music
- Label: Universal Music Jazz France

Richard Bona chronology
Bona Makes You Sweat (2008)	The Ten Shades of Blues (2009)	Bonafied (2013)

The Ten Shades of Blues is the fifth solo studio album by Cameroonian jazz bassist and musician Richard Bona. It was released on October 19, 2009 through Universal Music Jazz France. The album has charted in France and the Netherlands.

== Album theme ==
I like each of my albums to have a theme, a project behind it. This time I chose the blues. I look at the blues from the universal angle: you can find it in Africa, in America and in India. People put a style to it, a style with guitar and vocals. But I see it first as a scale, one that’s present in different traditions and expressions in music. Ten Shades of Blues means ten nuances, ten different ways of playing the blues.

— Richard Bona

== Track listing ==
All tracks are written by Richard Bona, except where noted

No.	Title	Writer(s)	Length
1.	"Take One"		0:53
2.	"Shiva Mantra"		5:47
3.	"Good Times"	Richard Bona, Frank McComb	4:31
4.	"M'Bemba Mama"		4:04
5.	"Kurumalete"		5:02
6.	"Souleymane"		4:58
7.	"African Cowboy"		5:05
8.	"Esukudu"		4:35
9.	"Yara's Blues"	Richard Bona, Morley Kamen	4:15
10.	"Sona Moyo"		4:56
11.	"Camer Secrets"		4:47

== Personnel ==
Credits adapted from AllMusic.

- Richard Bona – vocals, backing vocals, bass, guitar, keyboards, mandolin, drums, percussion, production, engineering, sampling

Additional musicians

- Obed Calvaire – drums
- Ryan Cavanaugh – banjo
- Marshall Gilkes – trombone
- Christian Howes – fiddle
- Jojo Kuoh – drums
- Niladiri Kumar – sitar
- Sylvain Luc – guitar
- Shankar Mahadevan – vocals, backing vocals
- Grégoire Maret – harmonica
- Frank McComb – vocals, backing vocals
- Jean-Michel Pilc – piano
- Vivek Rajgopalan – ganjeera, konnakol, mridangam, vocal percussion
- Bob Reynolds – saxophone
- Nandini Srikar – vocals, backing vocals
- Satyajit Talwalkar – konnakol, tabla, vocal percussion
- Bert van den Brink – Hammond organ

Technical personnel

- Rob Eaton – mixing
- Joseph George – engineering
- Alex Lijin Jolly – engineering
- Brian Montgomery – engineering
- Greg Calbi – mastering
- Justin Gerrish – assistant engineer
- Rick Kwan – assistant engineer
- Aki Nishimura – assistant engineer
- Hyomin Kang – mixing assistant

Additional personnel

- Pascal Bod – release coordination
- Marie Carette – design
- Ingrid Hertfelder – photography

== Chart performance ==
Chart (2009)	Peak position
France (SNEP)	116
Netherlands (MegaCharts)	49
