= Maria Markesini =

Greek singer and jazz pianist

- Born: Kefalonia, Greece
- Genres: Jazz, world
- Occupations: Musician, singer
- Instrument: Piano
- Label: Universal
- Website: www.mariamarkesini.com

Maria Markesini is a Greek singer and jazz pianist who lives and works in the Netherlands. She has released two albums, her debut on Universal in 2007 and Kosmo in 2009, featuring Richard Bona and Bert van den Brink. She is currently working with Jazz Impuls.

== Discography ==
Title	Album details	Peak chart positions
Title	Album details	NLD
The Mimis Plessas Songbook – 12 Sketches	Released: 2007; Label: Universal	—
Kosmo	Released: 2009	23
Cinemapassionata	Released: October 2011; Label: Amazing Music	—
