= Bona Makes You Sweat =

Live album by Richard Bona
- Released: March 7, 2008
- Recorded: July 11–12, 2007; A 38 club, Budapest, Hungary
- Genre: Jazz, world music
- Length: 66:37
- Label: Universal Music Jazz France
- Producer: Richard Bona, Daniel Richard (exec.)

Richard Bona chronology
Tiki (2005)	Bona Makes You Sweat (2008)	The Ten Shades of Blues (2009)

Professional ratings
Review scores
Source	Rating
AllMusic	4/5 stars

Bona Makes You Sweat is the first live album by Cameroonian jazz bassist and musician Richard Bona. It was recorded in A 38 club in Budapest, Hungary in 2007, and released on March 7, 2008, through Universal Music Jazz France. The album has charted in France.

Bona said, "After every concert I’ve ever played, I get people coming up saying they’d love to have a souvenir of the show. That’s the reason I recorded this album—for my fans."

== Critical reception ==
"Bona’s fifth and latest album—his first live recording—further confirms what we already know: Bona is one of the master electric bassists in our midst, not to mention a vocal conjurer with a natural flair, but one who tends to adopt the garb of sweet-spirited, unpretentious entertainer in his role as solo artist. (...) For all his deep-dish musicality and capacity for virtuosity on tap, in his role as a bandleader, Bona likes to keep the party rolling and the material on the simple, celebratory side," wrote Josef Woodard in his review for JazzTimes.

Daniel Lieuze of RFI Musique praised Bona's vocals: "A few tracks on, with the superb Indiscretions & Please Don’t [Stop], Bona stands up there live on stage and proves3lest there should linger even the slightest doubt—that as an instrumentalist he has a voice to rival the great George Benson’s. Bona is intent on showing off the many facets of that vocal timbre on Samaouma, an ‘a cappella’ polyphony which recalls the church songs he performed as a young boy growing up in Minta, his home village in eastern Cameroon."

== Track listing ==
All tracks are written by Richard Bona, except where noted

No.	Title	Writer(s)	Length
1.	"Engingilaye & Ekwa Mwato"	Richard Bona	13:24
2.	"Kivu" & "Suninga"	Richard Bona	8:01
3.	"Kalabancoro"	Richard Bona, Salif Keita	5:25
4.	"Samaouma"	Richard Bona	6:16
5.	"O Sen Sen Sen"	Marc Berthoumieux, Richard Bona	6:48
6.	"Indiscretions" & "Please Don't Stop"	Joe Zawinul/Richard Bona	8:40
7.	"Djombwe" & "I Wish" & "Trains"	Richard Bona/Stevie Wonder/Mike Mainieri	9:50
8.	"Te Dikalo"	Richard Bona	5:41
Total length:			66:37

== Personnel ==
Credits adapted from AllMusic.

- Richard Bona – bass guitar, vocals, mixing, production

Additional musicians

- John Caban – guitar
- Taylor Haskins – trumpet
- Ernesto Simpson – drums
- Etienne Stadwijk – keyboards
- Samuel Torres – percussion

Additional personnel

- Daniel Richard – executive production
- Daniel Boivin – engineering
- Pete Karam – mixing
- Tom Arndt – release coordination
- Pascal Bod – release coordination
- Garrett Shelton – release coordination
- David Passick – representation
- Akwa Betote – photography
- Philippe Savoir – design

== Chart performance ==
Chart (2008)	Peak position
French Albums (SNEP)	167
