= Scenes from My Life =

Studio album by Richard Bona
- Released: July 20, 1999
- Recorded: November 1998–January 1999
- Studio: Manhattan Center Studios, New York City; Studio Piccolo, Paris
- Genre: Ethno jazz, world fusion
- Length: 52:34
- Label: Columbia Jazz
- Producer: Richard Bona

Richard Bona chronology
Scenes from My Life (1999)	Reverence (2001)

Professional ratings
Review scores
Source	Rating
AllMusic	4/5 stars

Scenes from My Life is the debut studio album by Cameroonian jazz bassist and musician Richard Bona. It was released on July 20, 1999 through Columbia Jazz.

== Track listing ==
All tracks are written by Richard Bona, except where noted

No.	Title	Writer(s)	Length
1.	"Dipita"		4:28
2.	"New Bell"		4:25
3.	"Souwedi Na Wengue"	Frédérique Favarel, Richard Bona	3:35
4.	"Eyala"	Pascal Danaë, Richard Bona	4:35
5.	"Djombwe"		5:30
6.	"Te Dikalo"		4:15
7.	"One Minute"	Richard Bona, Sebastien Harr	4:28
8.	"Muna Nyuwe"		3:35
9.	"Na Mala Nde"		4:21
10.	"Konda Djanea"		4:59
11.	"Eyando"		4:26
12.	"Messanga"		3:57
