= Reverence (Richard Bona album) =

Studio album by Richard Bona
- Released: September 7, 2001
- Studio: Bonayuma Recording; Sear Sound, New York City
- Genre: Ethno jazz, world fusion
- Length: 47:54
- Label: Columbia Jazz
- Producer: Richard Bona

Richard Bona chronology
Scenes from My Life (1999)	Reverence (2001)	Munia (The Tale) (2003)

Professional ratings
Review scores
Source	Rating
AllMusic	4/5 stars
JazzTimes	positive
Jazz Review	3/5 stars

Reverence is the second studio album by Cameroonian jazz bassist and musician Richard Bona. It was released on September 7, 2001, through Columbia Jazz. The song "Reverence (The Story of a Miracle)" features guest appearance by prominent jazz guitarist Pat Metheny.

In her review of the album, Hilarie Grey of JazzTimes called Reverence "a warm and often touching effort that should cement Richard Bona's reputation as one of the great talents of our time."

== Track listing ==
All tracks are written by Richard Bona, except where noted.

No.	Title	Writer(s)	Length
1.	"Invocation (A Prophecy)"		2:05
2.	"Bisso Baba (Always Together)"		4:47
3.	"Suninga (When Will I Ever See You?)"		3:59
4.	"Ekwa Mwato (Affirmation of the Spirit)"		4:57
5.	"Sweet Mary (Everyone Has a Choice)"		4:23
6.	"Reverence (The Story of a Miracle)"		4:46
7.	"Te Misea (A Scream to Save the Planet)"		5:20
8.	"Muntula Moto (The Benediction of a Long Life)"		4:05
9.	"Laka Mba (Plea for Forgiveness – With the Pride of Lions)"		4:46
10.	"Ngad'a Ndutu (Widow's Dance – Celebration of a New Life)"		4:11
11.	"Esoka (Trust Your Heart)"		1:41
12.	"Mbanga Kumba (Two Cities, One Train)"	Richard Bona, Gil Goldstein	2:51

== Personnel ==
- Richard Bona – vocals, bass guitar, flute, percussion, keyboards, electric guitar, acoustic guitar

- Jimmy Hynes – trumpet
- Michael Davis – trombone, brass arrangement
- Aaron Heick – alto and tenor saxophone
- Oz Noy – wah wah guitar
- Etienne Stadwijk – keyboards, Rhodes piano, piano
- Vinnie Colaiuta – drums
- Eriko Sato – violin
- Shmuel Katz – violin
- Louise Schulman – viola
- David Cerutti – viola
- Richard Locker – cello
- Maxime Neumann – cello
- Alan Cox – flute
- Sheryl Henze – bass flute
- John Moses – bass clarinet
- Martin Kuuskmann – bassoon
- Grace Paradise – harp
- Ari Hoenig – drums
- Gil Goldstein – orchestration, strings arrangement
- Edsel Gomes – piano
- Luisito Quintero – percussion
- Pat Metheny – acoustic guitar
- George Whitty – piano, keyboards
- Michael Brecker – tenor saxophone

== Chart performance ==
Chart (2013)	Peak position
France (SNEP)	93
