= Nkolo =

Studio album by Lokua Kanza
- Released: 2010
- Length: 42:24

Lokua Kanza chronology
| Plus Vivant (2005) | Nkolo (2010) |

Professional ratings
Review scores
| Source | Rating |
|---|---|
| The Sunday Times | 3/5 stars |

Nkolo is the seventh studio album by Congolese singer-songwriter and composer Lokua Kanza. The album ranked number three in RFI Musique's Top 10 World Music Albums of the year.
