= Munia (The Tale) =

Studio album by Richard Bona
- Released: September 22, 2003
- Genre: Jazz, world music
- Label: Universal Music France

Richard Bona chronology
Reverence (2001)	Munia (The Tale) (2003)	Toto Bona Lokua (2004)

Professional ratings
Review scores
Source	Rating
AllMusic	4/5 stars

Munia (The Tale) (also stylized as Munia: The Tale) is the third studio album by Cameroonian jazz bassist and musician Richard Bona. It was released on September 22, 2003, through Universal Music France.

== Track listing ==
All tracks are written by Richard Bona, except where noted.

No.	Title	Writer(s)	Length
1.	"Bonatology (Incantation)"		1:42
2.	"Kalabancoro"	Richard Bona, Salif Keita	4:06
3.	"Sona Mama"		4:32
4.	"Painting a Wish"		5:51
5.	"Engingilaye"		4:45
6.	"Dina Lam (Incantation)"		5:29
7.	"Balemba Na Bwemba"		5:03
8.	"Muto Bye Bye"		6:03
9.	"Bona Petit"		4:50
10.	"Couscous"		3:29
11.	"Playground"	Etienne Stadwijk	6:31

== Chart performance ==
Chart (2013)	Peak position
France (SNEP)	90
