= Minta, Cameroon =

Coordinates: 4°35′N 12°48′E

Minta
- Commune and town
- Interactive map of Minta
- Country: Cameroon
- Time zone: UTC+1 (WAT)

Minta is a town and commune in Cameroon.

Bass guitarist Richard Bona was born in the town in 1967.

== See also ==
- Communes of Cameroon
