= Lokua Kanza =

Congolese musician (born 1958)

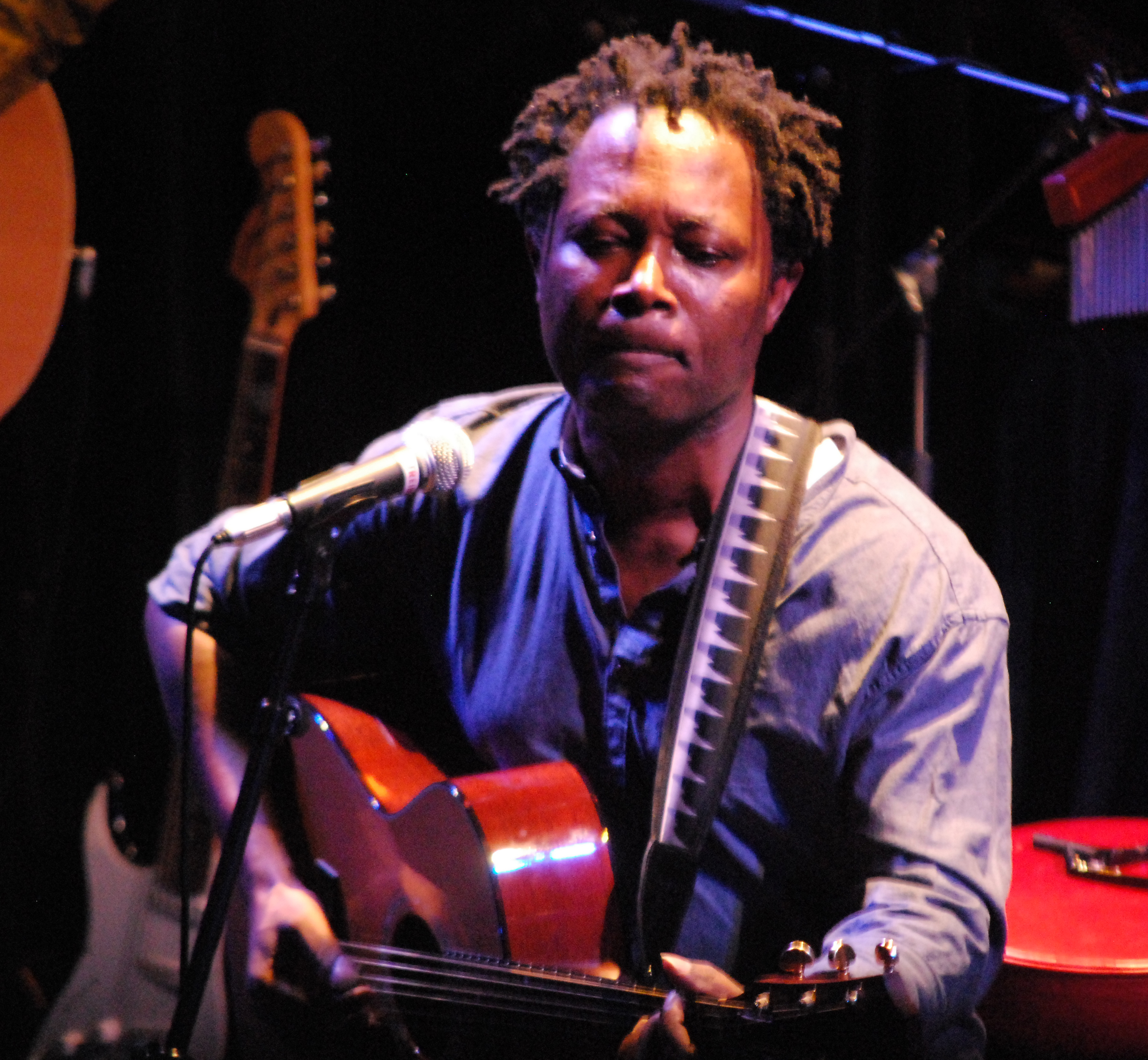
- Lokua Kanza, Innsbruck, 2010

Background information
- Born: Pascal Lokua Kanza; April 21, 1958 (age 68); Bukavu, Belgian Congo (modern-day Democratic Republic of the Congo)
- Genres: World music; chanson; jazz; R&B; rumba; samba
- Occupations: Singer; songwriter; multi-instrumentalist; philanthropist
- Instruments: Guitar, harmonica, vocals, drums, lap steel
- Years active: 1970s—present
- Labels: BMG; Universal; RCA; No Format!
- Website: www.lokua-kanza.com

Pascal Lokua Kanza (born 21 April 1958) is a Congolese singer, songwriter, arranger, producer, philanthropist, television personality, and multi-instrumentalist. He is known for his soulful, folksy sound, which is atypical of the dancefloor-friendly African rumba music. He sings in French, Swahili, Lingala, Portuguese, English, and Wolof. He was a member of the coaching panel of the Voice Afrique Francophone from 2016 to 2017.

Kanza began his career as a guitarist in Abeti Masikini's band Les Redoutables in 1977 and later moved to Ivory Coast, where he worked with Best Orchestra. In 1984, Kanza relocated to Paris, where he emerged as a significant figure within the French world music scene. His eponymous debut solo album, Lokua Kanza, released in 1992, catapulted him to stardom and won the Best African Album at the African Music Awards. Kanza's second album, Wapi Yo (1995), yielded his highest commercial success, with the lead single "Shadow Dancer" charting in several European countries. Kanza released his third album, Lokua Kanza 3, in 1998, followed by Toyebi Té (2002), Toto Bona Lokua (2004), Plus Vivant (2005), Nkolo (2010), Bondeko (2017), and Moko (2021).

== Early life and career ==
=== 1958–1992: Early life, education and music debut ===
Lokua Kanza was born Pascal Lokua Kanza on 21 April 1958, in Bukavu in South Kivu, in the eastern region of then-Belgian Congo (later the Republic of the Congo, then Zaire, and now the Democratic Republic of the Congo). He is the eldest of eight children, with a Mongo father and a Tutsi mother from Rwanda. In 1964, the family went to live in Kinshasa in a middle class area, until the day when Pascal's father, a ship's captain, died. His mother then moved to a much poorer area of the city, and Kanza had to work to feed the family as well as singing in churches.

Throughout his life in Kinshasa, Kanza received his education under his father's guidance at the National Institute of Arts (l'Institut National des Arts), which served as a hub for nurturing and training performance artists in Kinshasa, where he honed his skills. In 1977, Australian musicologist Gerhard Kubik and Malawian musician Donald Kachamba visited him and his classmate, Magongo Sanga, at the institute. They found that Kanza's father had collected 78 rpm records since 1948, which deeply influenced Kanza's skill on the guitar and his vocal harmonies in local church choirs.

After completing his secondary studies, Kanza joined Abeti Masikini's band Les Redoutables as a guitarist. Sources differ regarding the exact date of his entry into the band, with some citing 1980, while Kanza himself has stated that he joined at the age of 19, in 1977. During this period, a cultural decree promulgated by President Mobutu Sese Seko required him to abandon his Christian given forename, "Pascal", and simply go by "Lokua Kanza". Later, he moved to Ivory Coast and became a vocalist for the Best Orchestra at Hôtel Ivoire in Abidjan, a typical African band often associated with hotels and dining venues. The band's repertoire includes a medley of Anglo-Saxon covers and renowned African compositions. In 1984, Kanza relocated to Paris to advance his musical career. He enrolled in the CIM, Paris prominent operational base for Jazz and contemporary music, and fostered synergies with stars from the West Indies like Jean-Michel Cabrimol and his band the Mafia, as well as Francky Vincent.

From 1984 through the latter part of the 1980s, he performed and sang with Ray Lema, contributing to two of Lema's albums — Bwana Zoulou Gang (1987) and Nangadeef (1989), and in 1988, worked with several French musicians, including Charlélie Couture, Jacques Higelin, and Alain Bashung. He also appeared on albums by the Jazz band Sixun, Pierre Vassiliu, and Papa Wemba's Le Voyageur. In 1991, he teamed up with Cameroonian singer Manu Dibango and his Soul Makossa Gang, which helped kickstart his solo career. He started performing live and, in October 1992, opened for Beninese artist Angélique Kidjo at the Olympia Hall. During this time, he met his backing singer Julia Sarr from Senegal and percussionist Didi Ekukuan, with whom he remained closely affiliated. His unique repertoire, distinct from the typical Zairean music, won over the French audience.

=== 1993–1994: Lokua Kanza and performances ===
Kanza began working on his self-titled debut album Lokua Kanza in late 1992, recording in a modest studio loaned by a friend, without the backing of a major studio or technical team. He later explained that he chose to use his own name for the album because he struggled to find a fitting title and wanted to present himself authentically as a newcomer. Before its official release, he delivered two successful acoustic concerts at the Auditorium des Halles in Paris, alongside his brother, percussionist Didi Ekukuan, and Julia Sarr. They toured across France and Belgium before the album's release in October 1993 through YE WO Music. The album, which introduced a musical style distinct from the dominant African genres of the time, was received with widespread critical acclaim. French media outlets unanimously praised the release, and within a week it had sold 10,000 copies in Paris, an exceptional number considering that most African records sold only 3,000 to 4,000 units.

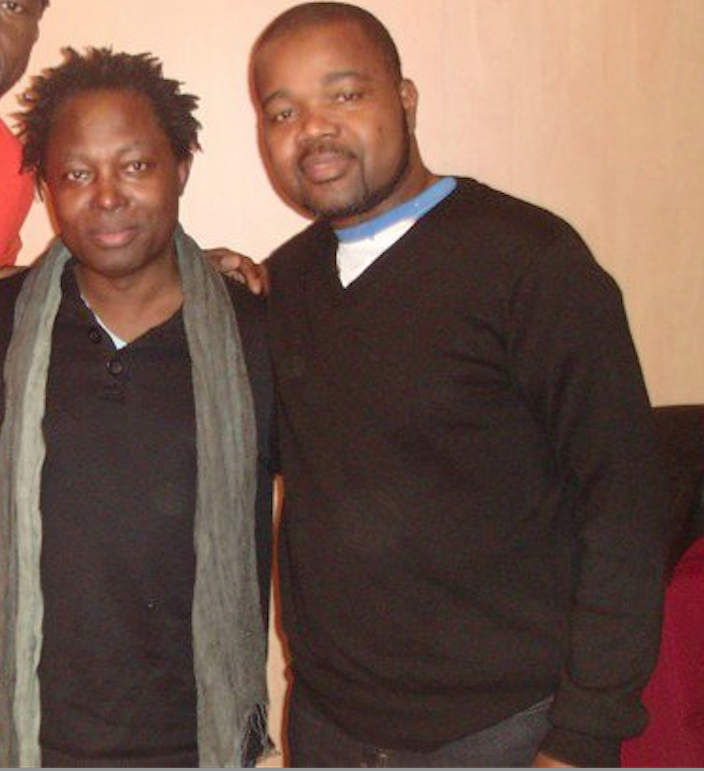
Lokua Kanza (left), January 2013

Kanza emerged as a musical star, celebrated for his mellifluous voice, guitar playing, and lyrical compositions, similar to Ismaël Lô. His pieces, concise and expressive, resonated with many audiences. In May 1994, he opened for Manu Dibango at the Casino de Paris, and in November, French singer Jean-Louis Aubert invited him to perform as a warm-up act for large crowds. Youssou N'Dour also enlisted his vocals for his album The Guide (Wommat). Following an extensive tour from November 1993 to May 1994 and the album's release in various countries, he reunited with Youssou in June for a concert at the Manhattan Center in New York City. During the summer, he collaborated on Wemba's Emotion album, contributing to arrangements and production at Peter Gabriel's Real World Studios in England. He co-wrote several breakout tracks, including "Yolele", "Show Me the Way", "Rail On", "Sala Keba (Be Careful)", and "Awa Y' Okeyi (If You Go Away)". Kanza worked intensively with Wemba for a month, later noting that the singer was reserved in conversation but very expressive in music. The project was a career-defining moment, as the album went on to sell over 650,000 copies across the globe, ranking among the best-selling African albums of its era. In September, Patrick Bruel asked him to open for him, and the performance was a success despite the audience's strong devotion to Bruel. He performed three concerts at the now-defunct Hot Brass venue in Paris, introducing a new show with a larger group featuring six choristers. In December, he won the Best African Album at the African Music Awards.

=== 1995–1997: Wapi Yo and other ventures ===
Kanza commenced work on his 14-track sophomore studio album, Wapi Yo (Where Are You?), in January 1995. The album saw its release in October of that year through RCA Records with distribution by BMG France. Though much more "Westernized" than his earliest repertoire, with the title in English and a French version, most of the other tracks were sung in Lingala and Swahili. Kanza received criticism for producing music that deviated from the authentic African style. Paradoxically, despite criticism, Wapi Yo garnered widespread recognition in 26 countries, with particular success in several European nations. The album's lead single, "Shadow Dancer", charted in multiple European countries. L'Événement du jeudi, a French weekly magazine, lauded Wapi Yo as "one of the most beautiful things to happen to African music."

In October 1995, Kanza performed at the Théâtre de la Ville in Paris for a sold-out week, becoming the first Congolese solo artist to do so since Papa Wemba in February 1990. In November, he collaborated with Ugandan artist Geoffrey Oryema on his third studio album, Night To Night, serving as the bassist on four tracks. Kanza's work as an arranger on Papa Wemba's album Emotion was awarded in December during the new edition of the African Music Awards, held in Libreville, Gabon.

In February 1996, Kanza was nominated for three awards at the Victoires de la Musique in France. On 1 April 1996, he performed at Olympia Hall and continued to participate in significant spring festivals, from Bourges to Angoulême. On 13 July, the Francofolies festival in La Rochelle held "La Fête à Lokua", a soirée where Kanza appeared alongside Youssou N'Dour and Papa Wemba. Shortly after, he performed at the Montreux Jazz Festival. He spent the rest of the summer performing throughout Africa, including at the Kora Awards ceremony in Johannesburg, where he won the Most Promising Male Artist of Africa. He closed the season with an appearance at the Madajazzcar festival in October.

In 1997, Kanza toured the United States, holding multiple concerts early in the year. He was invited by Brazilian singer Djavan Caetano Viana to take part in the Festival de Todos os Sons (Festival of All Sounds) in Curitiba that April. By June, he performed at the Espace Austerlitz in Paris, where he collaborated with several artists to advocate for undocumented migrants in France. He returned to New York City for the Vive la World! festival in July and gave another performance in Los Angeles.

=== 1998–2004: Lokua Kanza 3, Toyebi Té and Toto Bona Lokua ===
In June 1998, Kanza started working on his forthcoming 12-track eponymous album, Lokua Kanza 3, while on tour in Würzburg, Bavaria. While working on Lokua Kanza 3, he contributed substantially to Natalie Merchant's second studio album, Ophelia, as an acoustic guitarist by the summer's end. Lokua Kanza 3 came out in the fall under RCA Records, with added orchestral components, including strings that enriched the overall sound. Lyrics were performed in Lingala, Swahili, French, and English, and the record explored diverse themes linked to everyday life. It was supported by "Don't Tell Me", co-written with Natalie Merchant; "I Believe In You", with Siedah Garrett; and "More Than Just Sex", with Lamont Dozier. In 1999, Kanza engaged in several projects, composing the song "Liberté" for the Congolese-French collective Bisso Na Bisso, which appeared on their album Racines. He also appeared on Portuguese singer Sara Tavares' second studio album Mi Ma Bô on tracks such as "I've Got a Song in My Heart" and "Tu És O Sol".

In September 2001, Kanza signed a record deal with Universal Music to produce his impending fourth studio album, Toyebi Té, scheduled for an early 2002 release. Toyebi Té was officially released in June 2002 with 16 tracks and was a compendium of folk ballads sung in English, French, and Lingala. It featured collaborations with his four children, French jazz guitarist Sylvain Luc, French rapper Passi, the Bulgarian Symphony Orchestra, and his choristers, Julia Sarr and Didi Ekukuan. Billboard praised Toyebi Té, describing it as having a "marvelous sonic atmosphere". The album's retro jazz-infused single "Good Bye", with its English-accented sound, became a hit in Kinshasa, while "Ndagukunda Tshane", sung in French with minimal accompaniment, was a homage to his late mother and mothers globally, who faced ongoing perennial struggle against human injustice. "Kumbo" evolved as a vocal tone poem, and "Na Mileli" emerged as a gentle folk lament.

In March 2002, Kanza embarked on his European tour and later made a guest appearance in the debt relief compilation project, Drop the debt, alongside a collective of African and Latin American artists, such as Meiway, Tiken Jah Fakoly, Aladji Ndiaye, and Zêdess. Produced by Seydoni Productions, Drop the debt focused on alleviating debt for underprivileged nations and encouraging artists to push for global equality. In April 2003, Kanza held two concerts in Luanda and Cabinda Province, followed by two sold-out consecutive concerts in Yaoundé and Douala in October of that year. In November 2003, he performed in Luanda alongside the Brazilian singer Milton Nascimento.

In early 2004, Kanza collaborated with Cameroonian bassist Richard Bona and West Indian singer-songwriter Gérald Toto for a trio album project titled Toto Bona Lokua. Released in April under the No Format! label in Paris, Le Monde praised the album as a "perfect dream of freshness, lightness and sweetness, with its silky voices and fluid guitars....". He later wrote four songs for Beninese Yoruba singer Zeynab Habib's 14-track studio album, D'un endroit à un autre.

=== 2005–2016: from Plus vivant to "Lampedusa" ===
On 14 February 2005, Kanza released his 15-track sixth studio French album titled Plus Vivant. Co-arranged with Sylvain Luc, the album was co-produced by Universal Music and EmArcy Records. Kanza teamed up with Canadian singer Corneille on lead vocals and provided backing vocals with Valérie Belinga, Aretha Lokua, René Lokua, Anne Papiri, and Stephy Lokua. The bass was played by Guy Nsangué and Richard Bona, drums by Manu Katché, guitar by Sylvain Luc, keyboards by Vincent Bruley, percussion by Komba Bellow and Sola Akingbola, piano by Bertrand Richard, and violin by Jean-Luc Deschamps. Plus Vivant melded R&B with acoustic ballads and upbeat compositions, subtly alluding to the Congolese rumba style without overwhelming the auditory senses. On 27 May, he performed at the Café de la Danse in Paris, and received a nomination for Best African Artist at Black Music Awards in Cotonou. In November 2005, Kanza composed three songs for Brazilian singer Gal Costa's thirtieth studio album, Hoje.

In May 2006, Kanza contributed as a guest artist to the No Child Soldiers project—an album dedicated to combating the use of child soldiers in Africa, alongside Alpha Blondy, Angélique Kidjo, Salif Keita, Ben Okafor, Tété, Corneille Nyungura, Aïcha Koné, Rokia Traoré, Youssou N'Dour, Madéka, Bibie, Mama Keïta, Extra Bokaya, and Geoffrey Oryema. In 2007, he relocated to Brazil, where he devoted several years to further advancing his career. While in Brazil, he composed songs for various artists, most notably Ney Matogrosso and Vanessa de Mata. In March 2008, Kanza and Meiwey sold-out two consecutive concerts at the Heden Golf Hotel in Cocody and at Rue Princesse in Yopougon. That same year, he worked on Koffi Olomidé's album Bord Ezanga Kombo.

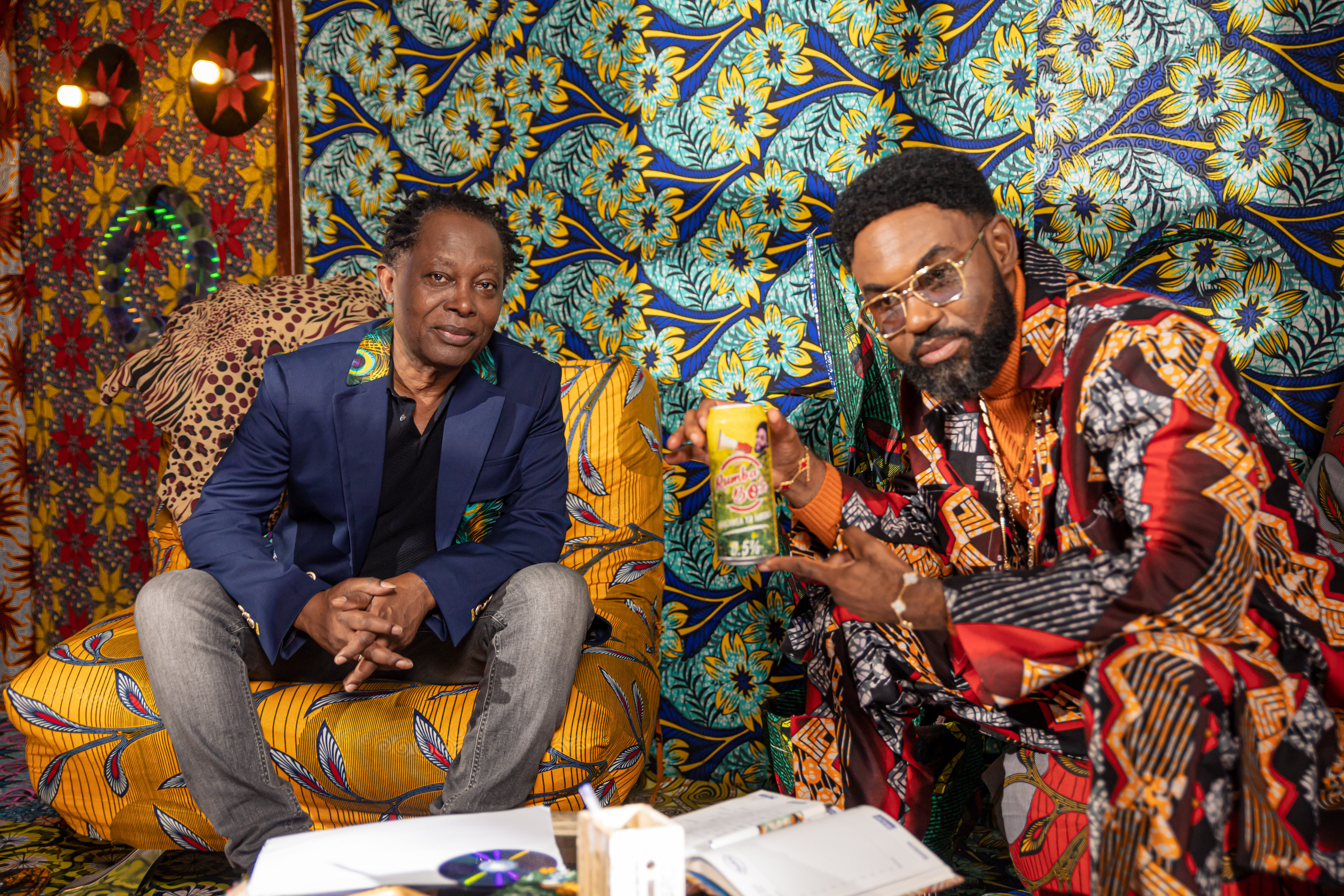
Lokua Kanza (left) and Yekima on the set of the music video Rumba Parlée.

On 25 March 2010, Kanza released his seventh studio album Nkolo. The album reflects Kanza's connection to his mother tongue, Lingala, and spirituality, accentuated by sober and delicate notes: chiseled guitars, thumb piano, Martenot waves, and Cristal Baschet. Drawing from his Brazilian influences, it fuses Congolese rumba, samba, and ndombolo, with tracks performed in Lingala, Swahili, Portuguese, and French. Nkolo includes two duets, one with the Brazilian artist Vander Lee and the other with Fally Ipupa. Patrick Labesse, writing for Jeune Afrique, described the album as a "collection of sober and airy ballads, a mosaic of rustling moments of freedom, soft timbres and enveloping melodies" and praised the inclusion of "rare sounds of the ondes Martenot and the Cristal Baschet" in Kanza's distinctive sound. The album's lead single, "Elanga Ya Muinda" (Garden of Light), carries a message of hope and self-healing. The negro-spiritual inspired "Mapendo" advocates for peace, urging people to cease violence, while "Famille", a collaboration with Fally and a choir of fifty children from Kinshasa, emphasizes the necessity of manifesting love. "Soki", featuring Roselyne Belinga, is a samba-infused dance track propelled by bandera drums. The breakout single, "Nakozonga", tells the story of emigrants longing to return home and features bassist Pathy Molesso, percussionists Alex Tran and Komba Mafwala, and vocalist Fally. To promote Nkolo, Kanza embarked on his European tour with several dates in France, Spain and Germany.

In June 2012, Kanza engaged in promotional activities for Nkolo in the Antilles during a music festival and later performed at the N'Sangu Ndji-Ndji music festival in Brazzaville. In October 2012, he received a nomination at the Ndule Awards in Abidjan. In February 2014, he participated at the Amani Festival in Goma, alongside Lexxus Legal and Innoss'B. On 31 May and 1 June 2014, Kanza celebrated his 20-year solo career by giving two concerts: one at the Théâtre de la Verdure and the other on the stage of the eighth edition of the International Jazz Festival also in Kinshasa. He was accompanied on stage by Richard Bona, Jean Goubald Kalala, Sara Tavares, Fally, Olivier Tshimanga, and Malaika Lokua. He then recorded a duet with Christophe Maé, aptly titled "Lampedusa", which appears on Maé's album L'attrape-rêves.

In October 2016, Kanza became a member of the coaching panel for The Voice Afrique Francophone, alongside A'Salfo from Magic System, Charlotte Dipanda, and Singuila.

=== 2017–present: Bondeko, Moko ===
In November 2017, Kanza collaborated with Richard Bona and Gérald Toto on their second trio album project, Bondeko, released again on No Format!. Bondeko included 14 tracks and fused samba-style rhythms with strummed guitars, flute, and subtle electro atmospherics. Reviewing for Le Monde, Patrick Labesse described the album as a "perfect dream of freshness, lightness and softness, with its silken voices and its fluid guitars, without anything of that order being planned".

On 12 September 2020, Kanza announced the release of his eighth studio album, Moko, during an interview on Radio Okapi. In an interview with Deo Salvator of Guitar magazine, Kanza mentioned that Moko signifies peace, unity, and harmony. The album was recorded across 12 countries and features vocals in 14 languages. It includes guest appearances by Manu Dibango, Richard Bona, Wasis Diop, Paco Séry, Sidiki Diabaté, Charlotte Dipanda, Pamela Baketana, Grady Malonda, and Ray Lema. Moko was officially launched on 21 April 2021 through a joint production by Nzela Productions and Universal Music Africa. The album's standout single "Tout va bien", a tribute to life and love, received widespread acclaim.

On 8 September 2021, he was appointed as UNICEF National Ambassador of the Democratic Republic to the Congo during International Literacy Day. On 17 March 2022, Kanza appeared on the song "Leopards Fimbu International" in support of Les Léopards during the 2022 FIFA World Cup African qualifiers' playoff round. Other artists involved in "Leopards Fimbu International" included Félix Wazekwa, Flaety W. Manuke, Kadiyoyo, JB Mpiana, Barbara Kanam, Koffi Olomide, Cindy Le Cœur, Héritier Watanabe, Laetitia Lokua, Adolphe Dominguez, Werrason, Lemiran LEM, Kristy Diamond, Ferré Gola, and Innoss'B. In July 2022, Kanza became a member of the Recording Academy, the body that oversees the Grammy Awards. In August 2024, Kanza guest-performed on Hervé Muthe's gospel single "Ekosimba Na Yesu", where the two vocalize trusting God through difficult times.

== Discography ==
Over the years, Lokua Kanza has continued to release a series of successful albums, including:

- Lokua Kanza (1993, YE WO Music)
- Wapi Yo (1995, RCA and BMG)
- Lokua Kanza 3 (1998, Universal)
- Toyebi Te (2002, Universal Music)
- Toto Bona Lokua (2004, No Format!) with Richard Bona & Gerald Toto
- Plus Vivant (2005, Universal Music and EmArcy Records)
- Nkolo (2010)
- Moko (2021)

== Awards and nominations ==
Year	Event	Prize	Recipient	Result	Ref.
1994	African Music Awards	Best African Album	Lokua Kanza	Won	
1996	Kora Awards	Most promising Male Artist of Africa	Himself	Won	
2005	Black Music Awards	Best African Artist	Himself	Nominated	
2015	Bilily Awards	Best Featuring Video	"Eve" (with Jean Goubald Kalala)	Won	
