= Tiki (album) =

Studio album by Richard Bona
- Released: October 2, 2005
- Genre: Jazz, world music
- Label: Universal Music France

Richard Bona chronology
Toto Bona Lokua (2004)	Tiki (2005)	Bona Makes You Sweat (2008)

Professional ratings
Review scores
Source	Rating
AllMusic	3.5/5 stars

Tiki is the fourth solo studio album by Cameroonian jazz bassist and musician Richard Bona. It was released on October 2, 2005, through Universal Music France, and has charted in several countries.

Susheela Raman, Mike Stern and Djavan made guest appearances on the album, and the 2006 edition of the record features a song "Please Don't Stop" with guest vocals by John Legend.

== Track listing ==
All tracks are written by Richard Bona, except where noted

No.	Title	Writer(s)	Length
1.	"Please Don't Stop" (featuring John Legend, 2006 edition only)		3:59
2.	"Dipama"		4:26
3.	"Tiki"		4:40
4.	"Kivu"		1:26
5.	"O Beta O Siba"		4:47
6.	"Esoka Bulu (Night Whisper)"		4:01
7.	"O Sen Sen Sen"	Marc Berthoumieux, Richard Bona	4:42
8.	"Manyaka O Brazil" (featuring Djavan)		4:06
9.	"Three Women"	Jaco Pastorius	3:15
10.	"Ba Senge"		4:09
11.	"Ida Bato (Ancient song 1789)"		1:10
12.	"Akwa Samba Yaya"		5:01
13.	"Calçadao de Copacabana"		4:07
14.	"Samaouma"		4:53
15.	"Nu Sango"		1:19

== Chart performance ==
Chart (2013)	Peak position
France (SNEP)	118
Netherlands (MegaCharts)	81
Poland (Polish Albums Chart)	41
US (Billboard Top World Albums)	10
