= Dan Currie (footballer) =

Scottish footballer (1935–1992)

Danny Currie
Personal information
- Full name: Daniel Currie
- Date of birth: 16 September 1935
- Place of birth: Renton, Scotland
- Date of death: 29 July 1992 (56 years.)
- Place of death: Brantford, Ontario, Canada
- Position: Inside right

Senior career*
Years	Team	Apps	(Gls)
–	Duntocher Hibernian		
1953–1963	Clyde	158	(40)
1963–1966	Queen of the South	61	(14)

International career
1957–1958	Scotland U23	4	(1)
1958	SFA trial v SFL	1	(0)
- * Club domestic league appearances and goals

Daniel Currie (1935 – 1992) was a Scottish footballer who played as an inside right, primarily for Clyde, winning the Scottish Cup with the club in 1957–58, plus the Glasgow Merchants Charity Cup a month later, followed by the Glasgow Cup five months after that.

He also played at senior level for Queen of the South, played four times for the Scotland under-23 team and was selected for an international trial match in 1958 which led to him being placed on the shortlist for the 1958 FIFA World Cup squad, though ultimately he did not make the final pool.

He later emigrated to Canada with his family in June 1973, playing for local teams in the Brantford, Ontario area. He died in July 1992.
