= Joe McClelland (Scottish footballer) =

Scottish footballer

Personal information
- Date of birth: 12 October 1935
- Place of birth: Edinburgh, Scotland
- Date of death: 24 April 1999 (aged 63)
- Place of death: Edinburgh, Scotland
- Position: Left back

Youth career
- Armadale Thistle

Senior career*
| Years | Team | Apps | (Gls) |
| 1954–1964 | Hibernian | 182 | (2) |
| 1964–1965 | Wrexham | 32 | (0) |
| Total | | 214 | (2) |
- * Club domestic league appearances and goals

Joe McClelland (12 October 1935 – 24 April 1999) was a Scottish footballer, who played for Hibernian and Wrexham. McClelland appeared for Hibernian in the 1958 Scottish Cup Final and made over 250 appearances for the club in all competitions.
