= Plus Vivant =

Studio album by Lokua Kanza
- Released: 19 July 2005
- Length: 52:26
- Language: French
- Label: Universal Music Jazz France, EmArcy Records

Lokua Kanza chronology
Toto Bona Lokua (2004)	Plus Vivant (2005)	Nkolo (2010)

Plus Vivant is the sixth album by singer, songwriter and composer Lokua Kanza.

== Track listing ==
1. "Voir le jour" - 3:54
2. "Caméra dans le coeur" - 3:35
3. "Envie d'aventure" - 3:45
4. "Tu es l'infini" - 3:17
5. "Plus vivant" (with Corneille) - 3:35
6. "Aller simple pour l'infini" - 3:45
7. "Laisse-moi le temps" - 3:42
8. "Si tu pars" - 3:11
9. "Anticyclone" - 4:04
10. "A tes côtés" - 3:56
11. "La clé des champs" - 3:35
12. "Le monde est fou" - 3:36
13. "Mal à dire" - 4:20
14. "Piololo" - 0:33
15. "Plus vivant" - 3:38
