= Richard Bona =

Cameroonian musician (born 1967)

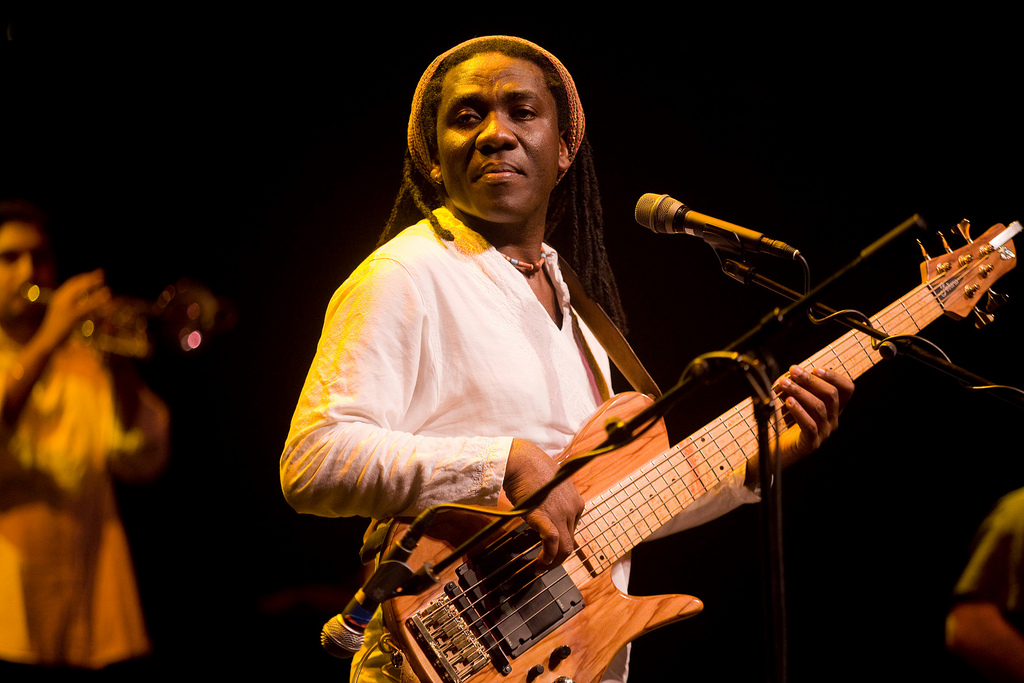
- Bona performing in 2009

Background information
- Born: Bona Pinder Yayumayalolo; 28 October 1967 (age 58); Minta, Cameroon
- Genres: Jazz fusion; world fusion; ethno jazz; funk
- Occupations: Musician, composer
- Instruments: Bass guitar, guitar, keyboards, percussions, vocals
- Labels: Universal; Columbia; Sony; Verve; GRP
- Website: richard-bona.com

Richard Bona (born 28 October 1967) is a Cameroonian multi-instrumentalist and singer.

== Early life ==
Bona Penda Nya Yuma Elolo was born in Minta, Cameroon, into a family of musicians, which enabled him to start learning music from a young age. His grandfather was a griot – a West African singer of praise and storyteller – and percussionist, and his mother was a singer. When he was four years old, Bona started to play the balafon. At the age of five, he began performing at his village church. Not being wealthy, Bona made many of his own instruments: including flutes and guitars (with cords strung over an old motorcycle tank).

His talent was quickly noticed, and he was often invited to perform at festivals and ceremonies. Bona began learning to play the guitar at the age of 11, and in 1980, aged just 13, he assembled his first ensemble for a French jazz club in Douala. The owner befriended him and helped him discover jazz music, in particular that of Jaco Pastorius, which inspired Bona to switch his focus to the electric bass.

== Career ==
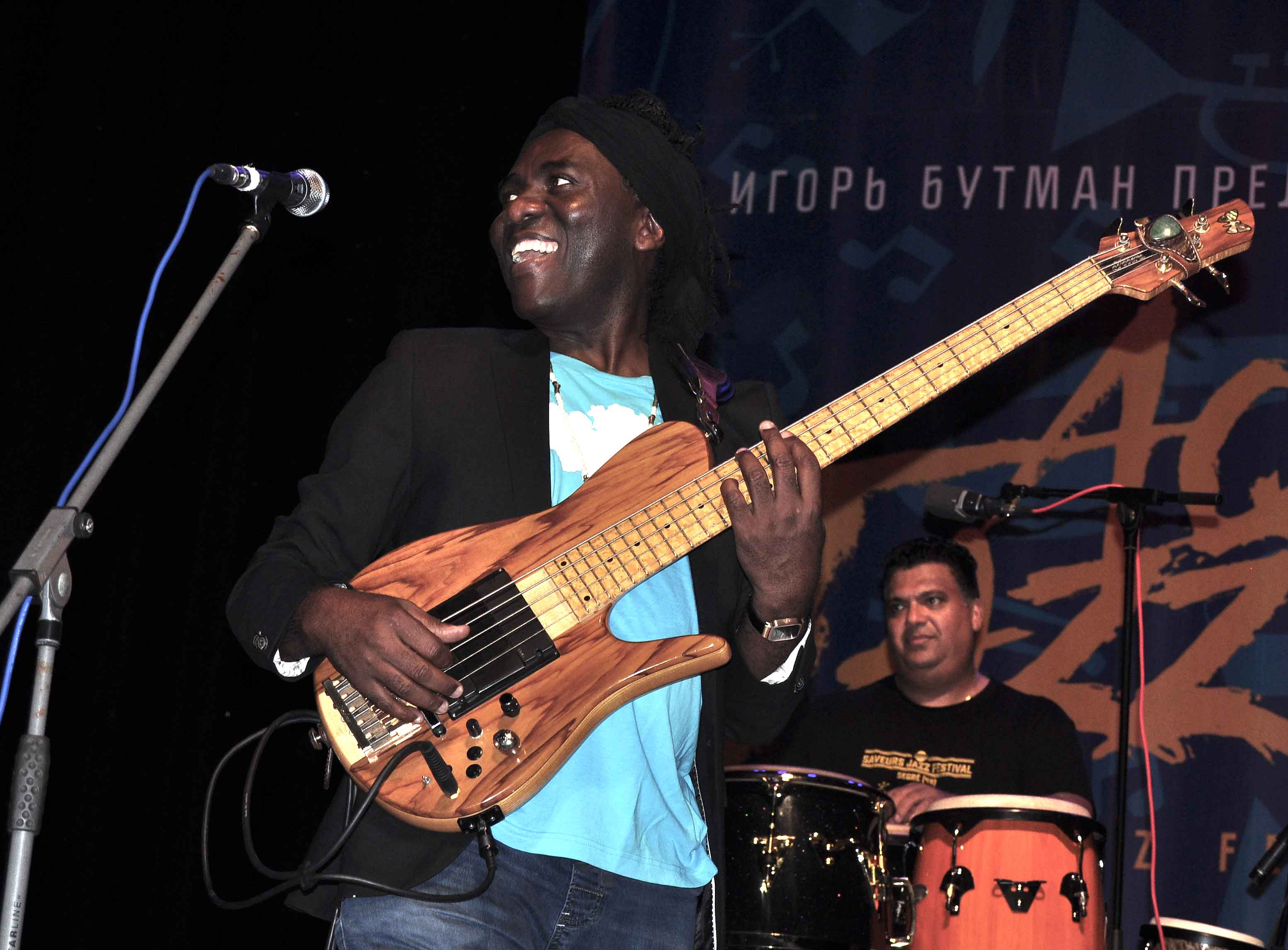
Bona performing at Sochi Jazz Festival in Russia, August 2016

Bona emigrated to Germany at the age of 22 to study music in Düsseldorf, soon relocating to France, where he furthered his studies in music.

While in France, he regularly played in various jazz clubs, sometimes with players such as Manu Dibango, Salif Keita, Jacques Higelin and Didier Lockwood.

In 1995, Bona left France and established himself in New York, where he still lives and works. In New York he played bass guitar with artists including Joe Zawinul, Larry Coryell, Michael and Randy Brecker, Mike Stern, George Benson, Branford Marsalis, Chaka Khan, Bobby McFerrin, and Steve Gadd.

In 1998, Bona was the musical director on Harry Belafonte's European Tour.

His debut solo album, Scenes from My Life, was released in 1999. He has also been prominently featured in Jaco Pastorius Big Band albums, as well as many other albums by various top-tier jazz musicians.

In 2002 Bona went on a world tour with the Pat Metheny Group. The release of the successful Speaking of Now album that year had marked a profound change in the group's direction by adding younger musicians to the band, notably with Bona as bassist, vocalist, guitarist and percussionist, along with drummer Antonio Sánchez and trumpet player Cuong Vu.

In 2005 Bona released his fourth solo album Tiki, which included a collaboration with John Legend on one track, entitled "Please Don't Stop." The album was nominated for Best Contemporary World Music Album at the 49th Grammy Awards.

He held a professorship of jazz music at New York University.

Between 2015 and 2020, he owned, together with restaurateur Laurent d'Antonio, the Club Bonafide, a jazz club in New York.

Richard Bona's music took on a distinctive Afro-Cuban flavor with the 2016 release of the Heritage album with Cuban band Mandekan Cubano. The album was released under Quincy Jones' Qwest label.

== Discography ==
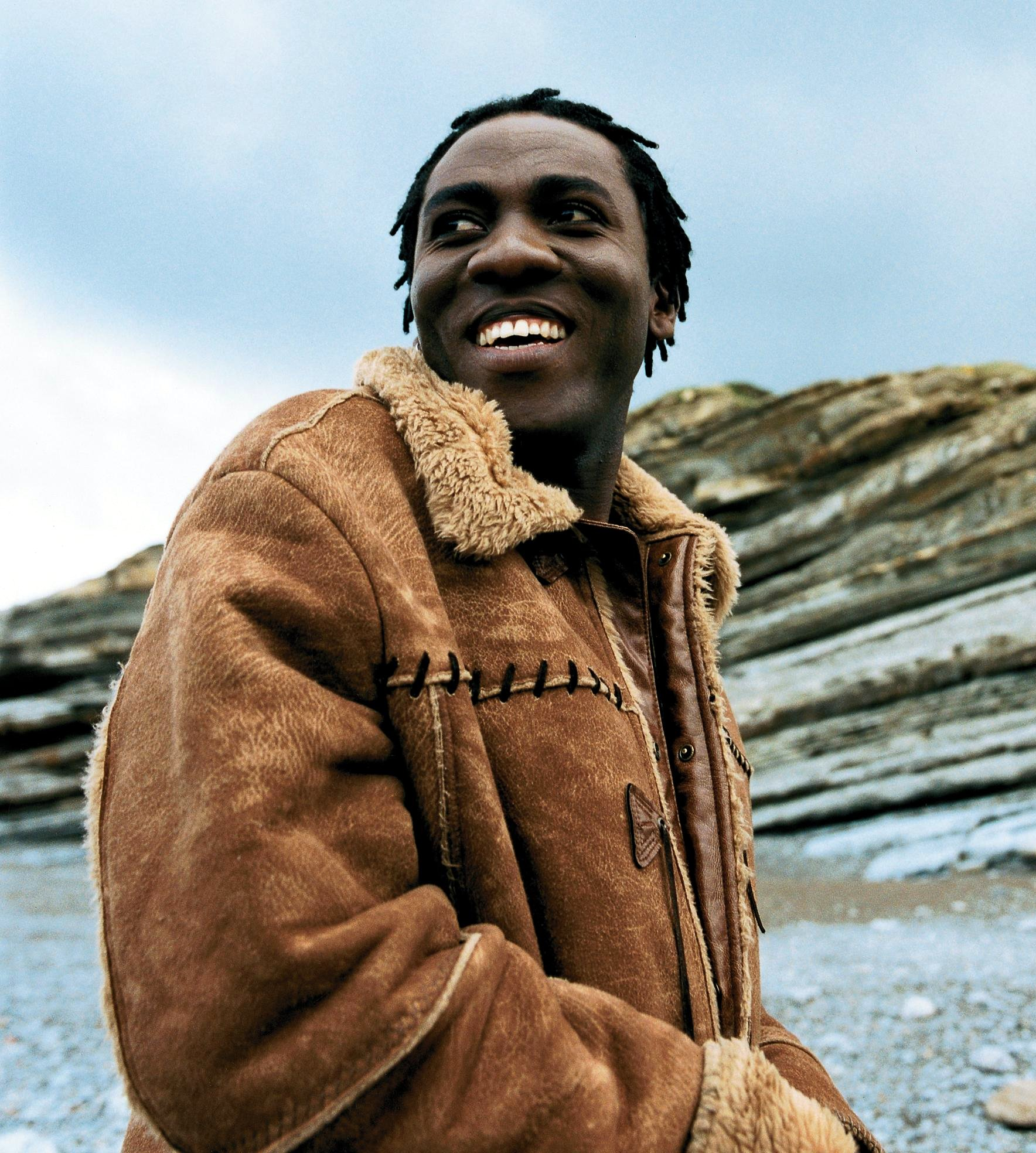
Richard Bona, 3 August 2006

=== Studio albums ===
Title	Album details	Peak chart positions					Certifications
Title	Album details	BEL (WA)	FRA	NLD	POL	US World Albums	Certifications
Scenes from My Life	Released: 20 July 1999; Label: Columbia Jazz	—	—	—	—	—	
Reverence	Released: 7 September 2001; Label: Columbia Jazz	—	93	—	—	—	
Munia	Released: 22 September 2003; Label: Universal Music France	—	90	—	—	—	
Toto Bona Lokua (with Gerald Toto and Lokua Kanza)	Released: 20 April 2004; Label: No Format!	—	—	—	—	6	
Tiki	Released: 2 October 2005; Label: Universal Music France	—	118	81	41	10	
The Ten Shades of Blues	Released: 19 October 2009; Label: Universal Jazz France	—	116	49	—	—	
Te Mesia (with DR Big Band)	Released: 14 November 2011; Label: Red Dot Music / EMI	—	—	—	—	—	
Bonafied	Released: 22 April 2013; Label: Universal Jazz France	159	162	—	33	—	ZPAV: Gold
Heritage (with Mandekan Cubano)	Released: June 2016; Label: Qwest Records	—	74	—			
"—" denotes a release that did not chart or was not released in that territory.

=== Live albums ===
Title	Album details	Peak chart positions
Title	Album details	FRA
Bona Makes You Sweat	Released: 7 March 2008; Label: Universal Jazz France	167

=== Extended plays ===
Title	Album details
Kaze ga Kureta Melody	Released: 2000; Label: Columbia Jazz

=== As guest ===
With Joe

- Signature (563 Entertainment, 2009)
- DoubleBack: Evolution of R&B (563 Entertainment, 2013)

With Pat Metheny

- Speaking of Now (Warner Bros., 2002)
- The Way Up (Nonesuch, 2005) – recorded in 2003–04

With Jaco Pastorius Big Band

- Word of Mouth Revisited (Heads Up, 2003)
- The Word Is Out! (Heads Up, 2006)

With Mike Stern

- Voices (Atlantic, 2001)
- These Times (ESC, 2004)
- Who Let the Cats Out? (Heads Up, 2006)
- Big Neighborhood (Heads Up, 2009)
- All Over the Place (Heads Up, 2012) – recorded in 2011

With Sadao Watanabe

- Sadao 2000 (Polydor/Verve, 2000)
- Wheel of Life (Verve, 2003)
- "One for You" Sadao & Bona Live (JVC, 2005)

With Kazumi Watanabe

- Mo' Bop (EWE, 2003)
- Mo' Bop II (AWS, 2004)
- Mo' Bop III (EWE, 2006)
- Acoustic Flakes (EWE, 2009)

With Joe Zawinul

- My People (ESC, 1996) – recorded between 1992 and 1996
- The Zawinul Syndicate, World Tour (ESC, 1998)[2CD] – live
- Faces & Places (ESC, 2002) – recorded between 2001 and 2002

With others

- Harry Belafonte, An Evening with Harry Belafonte & Friends (Island, 1997)
- BélO, Reference (Aztec Musique, 2008)
- George Benson, Irreplaceable (GRP, 2003)
- Randy Brecker, Hangin' in the City (ESC, 2001)
- Regina Carter, Rhythms of the Heart (Verve, 1999)
- Andre Ceccarelli, Ultimo (Universal/EmArcy, 2012)
- Mino Cinelu, Mino Cinelu (EmArcy, 1999)
- Larry Coryell, Spaces Revisited (Shanachie, 1997)
- Corin Curschellas, Goodbye Gary Cooper (Make Up, 1999)
- Chico DeBarge, Addiction (Kedar, 2009)
- Robert Dick, Jazz Standards on Mars (Enja, 1997)
- Coreon Du, Binario Da Banda (2014)
- Eliane Elias, Dave Grusin, Herbie Hancock, Bob James, Brad Mehldau, Portrait of Bill Evans (JVC, 2004)
- Jonathan Elias, Prayer Cycle: Path to Zero (Across the Universe, 2011)
- Bill Evans (saxophonist), The Other Side of Something (Intuition, 2007)
- Bela Fleck, Throw Down Your Heart (Rounder, 2009)
- Guaco, Bidimensional (Producciones Guaqueros, 2017)
- Anna Maria Jopek, ID (EmArcy, 2008)
- D. D. Jackson, Anthem (RCA Victor, 2000)
- Bob James, Joy Ride (Warner Bros., 1999)
- Eric Le Lann, Cap Frehel (Musidisc, 1992)
- Lionel Loueke, Mwaliko (Blue Note, 2010)
- Lura, Heranca (Lusafrica, 2015)
- Christophe Mae, La Vie D'artiste (Parlophone, 2019)
- Maria Markesini, Kosmo Etcetera Now (KTD, 2009)
- Hector Martignon, Refugee (Zoho, 2007)
- Keiko Matsui, Moyo (Stomp, 2008)
- Frank McComb, Love Stories (Columbia, 2000)
- Bobby McFerrin, Beyond Words (Blue Note, 2002)
- Jane Monheit, Come Dream with Me (N-Coded, 2001)
- Les Nubians, One Step Forward (Virgin, 2003)
- Danilo Perez, Panafrica (Verve, 2001)
- Dianne Reeves, Beautiful Life (Concord, 2013)
- Lee Ritenour, Smoke 'n' Mirrors (Peak, 2006)
- Renee Rosnes, Art & Soul (Blue Note, 1999)
- Kamil Rustam, Cosmopolitain (Can U Feel It, 2017)
- Philippe Saisse, Halfway 'Til Dawn (GRP, 1999)
- Soldier String Quartet, Inspect for Damaged Gods (Mulatta, 2004)
- Joseph Tawadros, Chameleons of the White Shadow (ABC, 2013)
- Jacky Terrasson, What It Is (Blue Note, 1999)
- Huong Thanh, Dragonfly (ACT, 2001)
- Two Siberians, Out of Nowhere (Heads Up, 2005)
- Victor Wooten, Palmystery (Heads Up, 2008)
