= Joe Baker =

England footballer (1940–2003)

Personal information
- Full name: Joseph Henry Baker
- Date of birth: 17 August 1940
- Place of birth: Woolton, Liverpool, England
- Date of death: 6 October 2003 (aged 63)
- Place of death: Wishaw, Scotland
- Position: Centre forward

Senior career*
Years	Team	Apps	(Gls)
- Coltness United
1956–1961	Hibernian	117	(102)
1956–1957	→ Armadale Thistle (loan)		
1961–1962	Torino	19	(7)
1962–1966	Arsenal	144	(93)
1966–1969	Nottingham Forest	118	(41)
1969–1971	Sunderland	40	(12)
1971–1972	Hibernian	20	(12)
1972–1974	Raith Rovers	49	(34)
Total		507	(301)

International career
1958–1963	England Under-23	6	(4)
1959–1966	England	8	(3)

Managerial career
- Fauldhouse United
- 1981: Albion Rovers
- 1984–1985: Albion Rovers
- * Club domestic league appearances and goals

Joseph Henry Baker (17 August 1940 – 6 October 2003) was a professional footballer who played at club level for Hibernian, Torino, Arsenal, Nottingham Forest, Sunderland and Raith Rovers. At the age of 26 he achieved the feat of having scored 100 top division goals in both Scotland and England.

He made eight appearances for the England national team, scoring three goals. Born to a Scottish mother and English father in Liverpool, Baker spent the first six weeks of his life in England and was then raised in Scotland until he moved to Italy aged 20. Despite self-identifying as Scottish, rules at the time meant his only international football eligibility was for his birth nation. His full England debut in 1959 made him the first professional footballer to represent England while playing for a club outside the English football league system, and the first to have never played for an English club before his full England debut.

== Early years ==
Joe Baker's mother Elizabeth was Scottish. While sources conflict as to whether his father George, a seaman, was Scottish or Liverpudlian, an interview in "The Topical Times Football Book 1959", quotes Baker stating of he and his elder brother Gerry, "Both our parents were Scots". When living in New York, Gerry was born in 1938. After the outbreak of World War Two, the family moved to Liverpool when George volunteered for the Merchant Marine. The family then evacuated from "badly bombed Liverpool" to Lanarkshire in Scotland, just six weeks after Joe's birth. George did not survive the war, dying from injuries received in the sinking of his boat.

The Baker brothers spent the rest of their childhood living in Lanarkshire. They attended Park Street Junior School then St Joseph's Secondary School, both in Wishaw. He then joined Motherwell Boys' Guild (a juvenile club), to play on Saturday afternoons as well as for the school in the mornings. He gained two Scottish Schools international caps (in matches against England and Wales). Away from football, he started en engineering apprenticeship.

== Club career ==
=== Hibernian ===
Shortly after leaving school, Baker became a Junior-level player with Coltness United. While there he was chosen for select sides of both the Lanarkshire and East of Scotland Junior Associations. He spent a month on trial with Chelsea as a youngster, but was not signed.

He signed professional terms with Hibernian, and was then farmed out to another Junior team, Armadale Thistle. In his first season with Hibs, 17-year-old Baker scored all four in a 4–3 victory over city rivals Hearts in the 1958 Scottish Cup quarter-final. He played in Hibs' 1958 Scottish Cup final 1–0 loss to Clyde in front of over 95,000 fans. He also scored nine goals in a Scottish Cup tie against Peebles Rovers. Baker was Hibs' top goalscorer for four consecutive seasons, scoring a club record 42 goals in 33 league games during the 1959–60 season. In all he scored 102 goals in just 117 league games, and 159 goals in all competitions for the Edinburgh club. In 1961 Baker was transferred after the Hibs board refused to give him a £5 increase from his existing wage of £12 a week.

Gerry Baker signed for Hibernian from Manchester City in November 1961, six months after Joe had left Easter Road.

=== Torino ===
On 31 May 1961, Baker signed in Turin for Torino for £75,000. Another forward raised in Scotland, Denis Law, joined Torino from Manchester City in the same close-season. Baker and Law both made their senior competitive Torino debut in a 2–0 Serie A defeat at Sampdoria on 27 August 1961. Their senior competitive home debut was in Serie A against LR Vicenza a week later on 3 September. In the 11th minute, Law's equaliser made him the first Scot to score in Serie A. Baker also scored his first goals in Italian football in that game; His 25th and 36th minute goals had Torino 3–1 up at half-time, but Vicenza fought back to draw 3–3.

Baker's next goal was on 1 October, the only goal of the game to win the Turin derby against Juventus. Three further goals meant by the end of November he had played in 12 of Torino's 14 Serie A games, in which he scored six goals. He played in seven more Serie A games (scoring once, in the 2–1 defeat at Bologna on 29 January 1962). Baker's last Serie A game was the 3–1 home defeat to Juventus on 4 February 1962. As a result of a 4am car crash in which Baker drove the wrong away around a roundabout, he then needed life-saving surgery and spent over a month on a drip feed. Law had no serious injuries from the crash. Baker's last Torino game was his and Law's only Coppa Italia experience. They lost 2–0 at home in the round of 16 versus Napoli on 25 April.

Baker and Law disliked the intrusive Italian press, meaning they spent most of their time in their Turin apartment. Both players left Italy after one season.

=== Arsenal ===
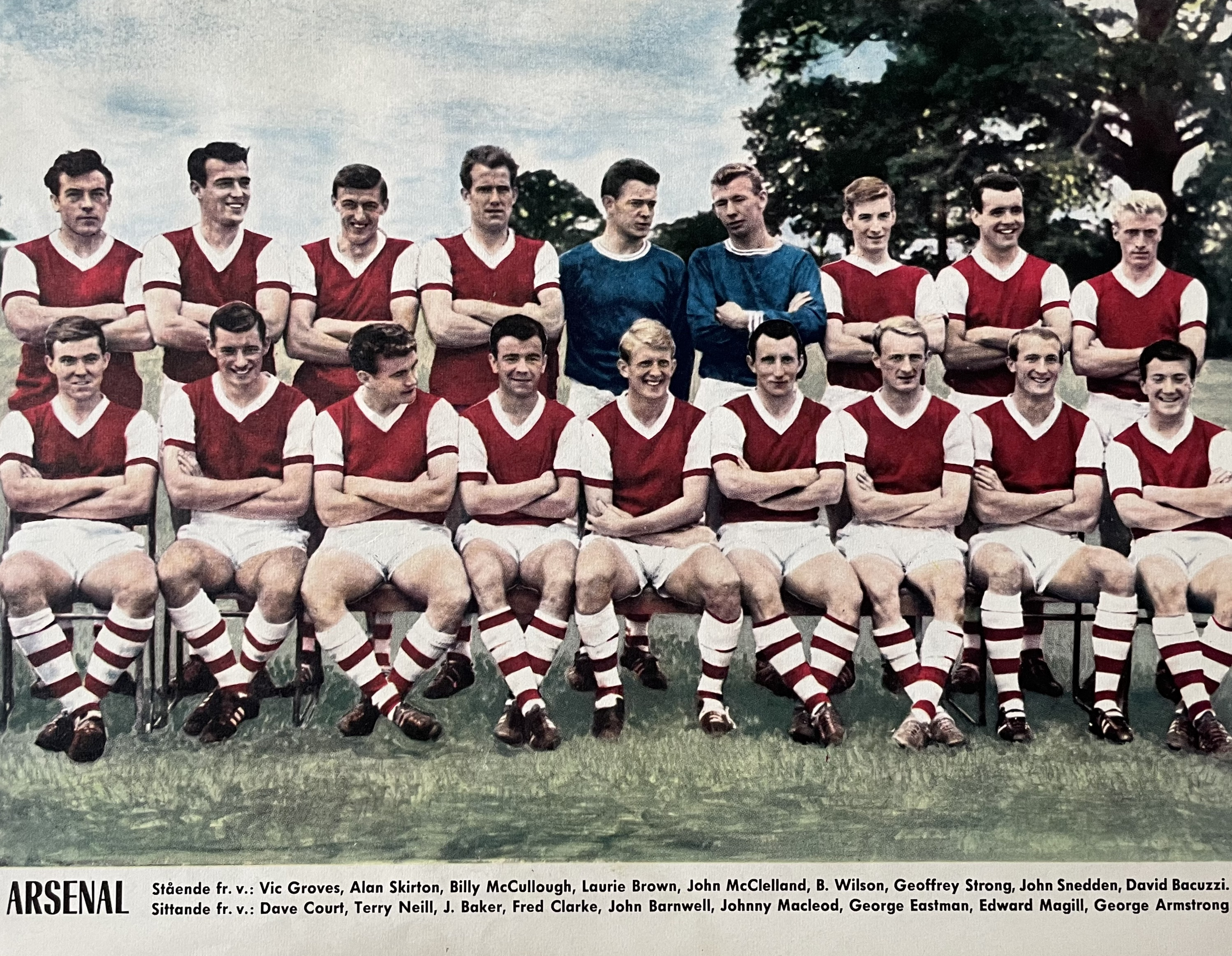
Arsenal in 1964, Joe Baker sits third from left on the bench.

Baker recovered from his injuries and returned to the UK in July 1962, joining Billy Wright's Arsenal for a club record fee of £70,000. He made his debut against Leyton Orient on 18 August 1962, and in all spent four seasons with the Gunners. For three out of those four seasons (1962–63, 1964–65 and 1965–66) he was the club's top scorer; in total he scored 100 goals in 156 games in all competitions, making him one of the club's most prolific goalscorers of all time.

His pace and acceleration made him a highly effective and dynamic attacker, and he was equally adept with his feet and his head, despite his lack of height. With Geoff Strong he formed one of Arsenal's most prolific striking partnerships, but the defence could not match the quality of the team's attack, which meant they were unable to finish above 7th in the league during his time at the club.

=== Nottingham Forest ===
Midway through the 1965–66 season, Baker transferred to Nottingham Forest for £65,000. His Forest debut was a 1–0 league home win over Burnley on 8 March 1966. Four days later Baker opened his Forest goalscoring account with two in a 3–3 draw at Northampton Town. Baker's seventh league goal for Forest was on 27 August 1966 in a 2–1 win at Sheffield United; added to his 93 Arsenal top flight goals at Arsenal and 102 top tier strikes for Hibs, he reached 100 top division goals in both Scotland and England aged 26 years and 10 days.

Baker had a successful 1966–67 season at Forest as the club finished runners-up to the club that would win the following season's European Cup: Matt Busby's Manchester United (whose team included Baker's ex Torino teammate, Denis Law). Baker was injured during the season in the 3–2 victory over Everton in the FA Cup 6th round and missed the rest of the fixtures. Prior to his injury, Forest had lost only once in 28 games; after it they only won three of their six remaining league games and lost in the FA Cup semi-final to Tottenham Hotspur. In three years at Forest, Baker scored 41 goals in 118 league games.

=== Sunderland, return to Hibs and Raith Rovers ===
Baker then moved to Sunderland for a fee of £30,000, and spent the following two seasons playing for the Black Cats.

He returned to Hibernian for a second time in 1971 and scored 17 goals in 34 appearances. This gave him a final Hibs tally of 158 goals from 193 starts.

He moved to Raith Rovers in 1972 and retired in 1974. He ended his professional career with 301 league goals in 507 games.

== International career ==
Baker was selected twice by the Scottish Schools team. Despite Scottish parentage, spending all but the first six weeks of the first 20 years of his life living in Scotland and self-identifying as Scottish, rules at the time meant his birthplace made him only eligible to play international football only for England; "I was the first Scottish League player to play for England and it was a hard thing to take because I was a Scot, as far as I was concerned." His brother Gerry was similarly only eligible to represent his birth nation (the United States, for whom he played seven times).

He made his England debut against Northern Ireland in November 1959, which made him the first professional player to be capped for England while playing for a club outside the English football league system. It also meant that he was the first player to play for England without having ever played for an English club (Owen Hargreaves was the next player to do this, in 2001).

Baker won eight caps for the senior England side, five while he was playing for Hibs and three while with Arsenal. These later caps were won when he earned a brief recall to the England side in 1965. Despite scoring in a 2–0 win over Spain, Baker did not make the squad for the 1966 FIFA World Cup.

== Managerial career and later life ==
Baker later became Albion Rovers manager on two occasions, but never pursued a full coaching career, instead running a pub and working for Hibernian's hospitality service. He died at the age of 63, after suffering a heart attack during a charity golf tournament, dying in Wishaw General Hospital soon after.
