= John Fraser (footballer, born 1936) =

Scottish footballer (1936–2025)

Personal information
- Date of birth: 2 March 1936
- Place of birth: Edinburgh, Scotland
- Date of death: March 2025 (aged 88–89)
- Height: 5 ft 9 in (1.75 m)
- Position: Outside right

Youth career
- Edinburgh Thistle

Senior career*
Years	Team	Apps	(Gls)
1954–1968	Hibernian	195	(24)
1968–1969	Stenhousemuir	7	(0)
Total		202	(24)
- * Club domestic league appearances and goals

John Fraser (2 March 1936 – March 2025) was a Scottish footballer, who played primarily as an outside right for Hibernian in the late 1950s and early 1960s. After a brief spell with Stenhousemuir, Fraser returned to Hibs as a coach, a position he held for 10 years under three different managers.

== Biography ==
Fraser signed for Hibernian in 1954, but was initially a part-time player while he completed his national service. He had the unenviable task of covering for and eventually replacing Gordon Smith, who Fraser idolised. Fraser played in the 1958 Scottish Cup Final and some of Hibs' famous European nights in the early 1960s, including a friendly match win against Real Madrid and a Fairs Cup win against Barcelona.

After spending a few years as a player-coach in Hibernian's reserve team, Fraser briefly played for Stenhousemuir, before returning to Hibs as a coach. Bob Shankly brought him back initially, and Willie MacFarlane then offered Fraser a full-time coaching position. Fraser continued in this position under Eddie Turnbull, as Hibs enjoyed one of the most successful periods in their history in the early 1970s.

Fraser's death was announced on 17 March 2025, at the age of 88.
