= Bonafied =

Studio album by Richard Bona
- Released: April 22, 2013
- Genre: Jazz, world music
- Label: Universal Jazz France

Richard Bona chronology
The Ten Shades of Blues (2009)	Bonafied (2013)

Bonafied is a studio album by Cameroonian jazz bassist and musician Richard Bona. It was released on 22 April 2013 through Universal Music.

The album has charted at number 33 in Poland and number 162 in France.

== Track listing ==
No.	Title	Length
1.	"Dunia E"	5:00
2.	"Mut'Esukudu"	6:10
3.	"Akwappella"	3:18
4.	"Janjo La Maya"	5:22
5.	"Mulema"	4:39
6.	"Uprising of Kindness"	4:01
7.	"Tumba La Nyama"	4:31
8.	"Diba La Bobe"	5:20
9.	"La Fille D'a Côté"	4:06
10.	"Socopao"	5:55
11.	"On the 4th of July"	4:10

== Charts and certifications ==
=== Weekly charts ===
Chart (2013)	Peak position
Belgian Albums (Ultratop Wallonia)	159
French Albums (SNEP)	162
Polish Albums (ZPAV)	33

=== Certifications ===
Region	Certification	Certified units/sales
Poland (ZPAV)	Gold	10,000^{*}
^{*} Sales figures based on certification alone.
