= Andy Aitken (footballer, born 1934) =

Scottish footballer

Personal information
- Full name: Andrew Fox Scott Aitken
- Date of birth: 21 August 1934
- Place of birth: Edinburgh, Scotland
- Date of death: 28 February 2005 (aged 70)
- Place of death: Edinburgh, Scotland
- Position: Winger

Senior career*
Years	Team	Apps	(Gls)
1955–1959	Hibernian	35	(11)
1959–1961	West Bromwich Albion	22	(2)
1961–1962	Falkirk	9	(4)
1962–1963	Raith Rovers	13	(2)
Total		79	(19)
- * Club domestic league appearances and goals

Andrew Fox Scott Aitken (21 August 1934 – 28 February 2005) was a Scottish footballer, who played for Cliftonville, Hibernian, West Bromwich Albion, Falkirk, Raith Rovers and Gala Fairydean.

Aitken began his senior football career by playing for Cliftonville while undergoing his national service in Northern Ireland. After completing his national service, he signed for Hibernian in 1955. He made his debut for Hibs in a match against Falkirk, playing in a pair of boots borrowed from Gordon Smith. Aitken became a key player in the Hibs team over the next few years, including their run to the 1958 Scottish Cup Final. Aitken's injury early in that match badly affected Hibs' chances, as substitutes were not yet allowed.

Aitken moved to West Bromwich Albion in September 1959, but was hindered by injury during his time with the Midlands club. He returned to Scotland with Falkirk, and helped them gain promotion to Scottish League Division One. He then moved on to Raith Rovers, helping them reach a Scottish Cup semi-final. Aitken also played for Gala Fairydean before retiring from the game.
