= Mike Clinton =

Scottish footballer

Personal information
- Position: Wing half

Youth career
- Ashfield

Senior career*
Years	Team	Apps	(Gls)
1954–1961	Clyde	141	(4)
1961–1963	Raith Rovers	33	(4)
1963–1964	Caledonian		
1964–1969	Cowdenbeath	105	(4)
Total		279	(12)

Managerial career
- 1976: Clyde
- * Club domestic league appearances and goals

Michael Clinton was a Scottish footballer, who played as a wing half.

Clinton was best known for his time at Clyde where he made over 200 appearances in all competitions, and was part of the 1957–58 Scottish Cup winning team. He also won the Glasgow Cup later that year, and was selected for the Glasgow FA side to play against the Sheffield FA in 1960.

Clinton returned to Clyde in September 1976 to take over as interim manager for three months after Stan Anderson fell ill.
