= Mélissa Laveaux =

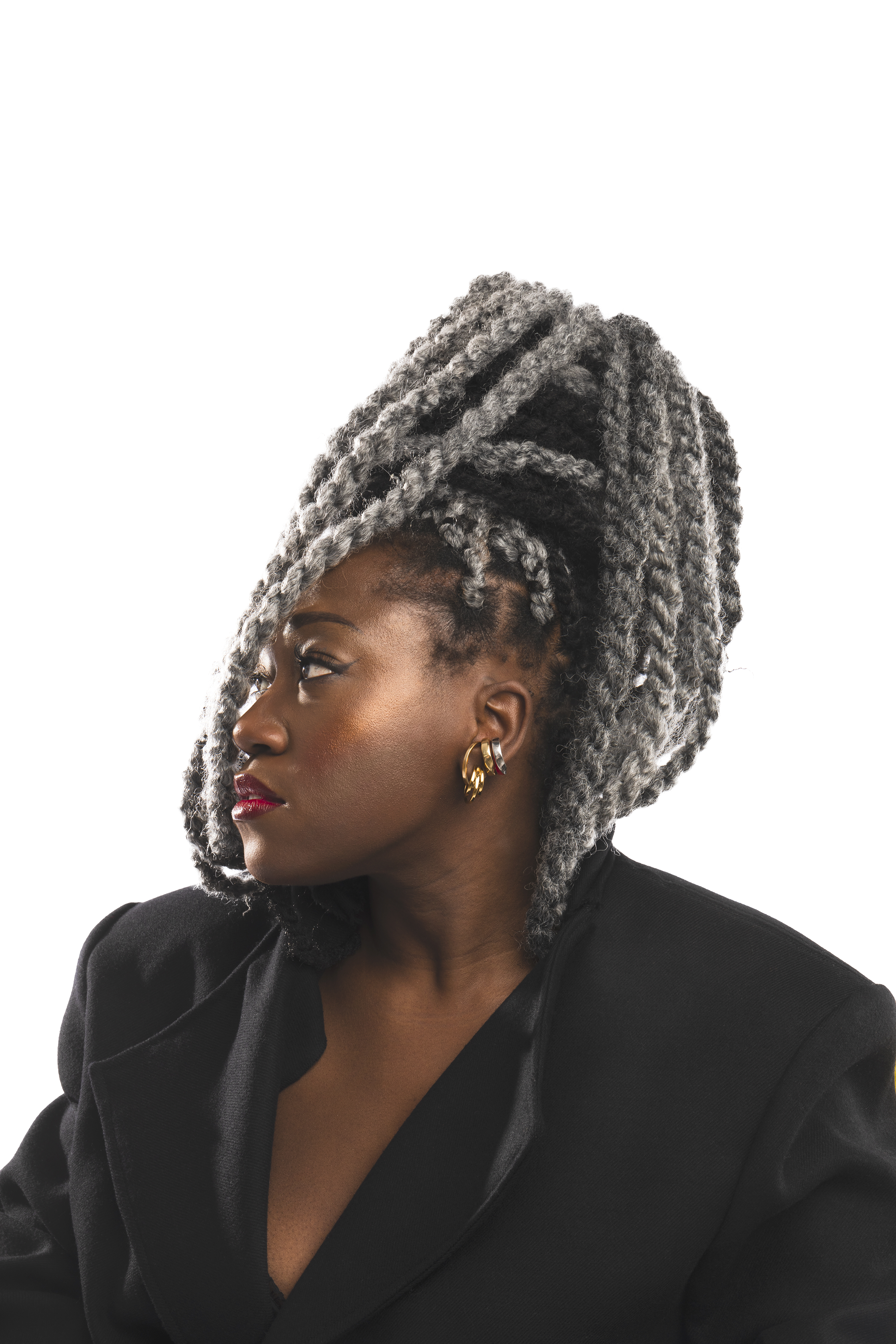

Background information
- Born: 9 January 1985 (age 41); Montreal, Quebec, Canada
- Genres: Indie rock, folk rock, pop rock
- Occupation: Singer-songwriter
- Instruments: Vocals, guitar
- Labels: No Format!, Malleable Records
- Website: http://melissalaveaux.com/

Mélissa Laveaux (born 9 January 1985) is an independent Canadian singer-songwriter and guitarist of Haitian descent previously signed to No Format!. Her music has been described as a mix of roots, folk, and blues using her signature percussive finger-style guitar stylings and soulful vocals. In 2006, Laveaux released the first full-length album of her own songs, which she co-produced with percussionist Rob Reid (on tabla and cajón) and Lisa Patterson of Imaginit Music Studios. Laveaux has received critical praise from her peers in such magazines as ColorLines and is a Songs from the Heart recipient from the 2006 Ontario Council of Folk Festivals' conference in the World Music category for penning "Koud'lo".

Laveaux has opened for several artists who have inspired her music, including Meshell Ndegeocello, Feist and Lura. She has also performed at jazz and popular music festivals around the globe. Although most of her performances have been in France, she regularly performs in Japan and Spain. Festivals that have featured Laveaux include the Montreal International Jazz Festival (2007, 2009 and 2010), Cully Jazz, Donostia Jazzaldia, Festival du Bout du Monde (2008), Les Francofolies de La Rochelle (2009), and Sakifo Musik Festival in La Réunion Island and le Printemps de Bourges. She has been a featured guest on CBC Radio's local programs Ottawa Morning and All in a Day and in the national radio broadcasts Bandwidth, Canada Live, and Go!.

Laveaux earned an Honours Bachelor of Arts in Ethics at the University of Ottawa in December 2007.

In 2009, Laveaux collaborated with producer MaJiKer for a track to be released on his B-side EP of Body Piano Machine.

In 2018, Laveaux's album Radyo Siwel was long-listed for the Polaris Music Prize.

== Camphor and Copper ==
In July 2006, Laveaux released her first album Camphor & Copper on the independent record label Malleable Records. In 2007, she won the Lagardère Talent foundation's musician bursary. The grant was used to record and mix a new version of Camphor & Copper, mixed and mastered by Bénédicte Schmidt and released on No Format!. Five tracks were cut, and five additional tracks were added. Covers are "I wanna be evil" (Eartha Kitt) and "Needle in the Hay" (Elliott Smith), as well as a traditional Creole lullaby "Dodo Titit", originally sung by Martha Jean Claude. Producers who performed on the album include Majiker (beatbox) and Lisa Patterson (keys), while additional performers included Morgan Doctor (drums) and Martin Gamet (bass). This version of the album was released in France on 18 November 2008. Other European releases followed: Spain (2009), Italy (2009), Switzerland and Belgium (2009), Portugal (2010), Germany and Austria (2009), followed by a Canadian release in March 2010 with Montreal indie label Spectra.

In 2009, Laveaux collaborated with producer Mocky for a cover of Beyoncé's "Crazy in Love". This track was included alongside other B sides for the deluxe version of Camphor & Copper. Other tracks included "Les Cendres" and "First Class".

In 2012, Laveaux collaborated with Andil Gosine in Cutlass, a performance art piece. She performed several songs, including "My Boat" and Tina Turner's "Private Dancer".

== Dying is a Wild Night ==
Her second full-length album was released in February 2013 in Europe, entitled Dying Is a Wild Night, referencing an Emily Dickinson quote: "Dying is a wild night and a new road".

=== Musicians ===
- The Jazz Basterds: Ludovic Bruni, Vincent Taeger (from Poni Hoax) and Vincent Taurelle (keyboardist with Air) – guitar, bass, drums, percussions, piano, synths, keys and programming.
- Mélissa Laveaux – guitar, lead and backing vocals
- Thea Hjelmeland – backing vocals

=== Production ===
- Mélissa Laveaux – songwriter
- Ludovic Bruni, Vincent Taeger, Vincent Taurelle – producers
- Bertrand Fresel – mixing
- Adam Ayan – mastering

== Discography ==
Albums (full-length)

- Camphor & Copper (Malleable Records, 2006)
- Camphor & Copper (No Format!, 2009)
- Dying Is a Wild Night (No Format!, 2013)
- Radyo Siwel (2018)
- Mama Forgot Her Name Was Miracle (2022)
- At My Softest, I Am Most Dangerous (2026)

Demos

- Four Piece Mosaic
- Live at Alumni
- Warm Milk and Honey

Compilations

- Hands off Haiti (2007)
- Nos Artistes – édition branchée (2007)
- SOS Haiti (2010)

== Gallery ==
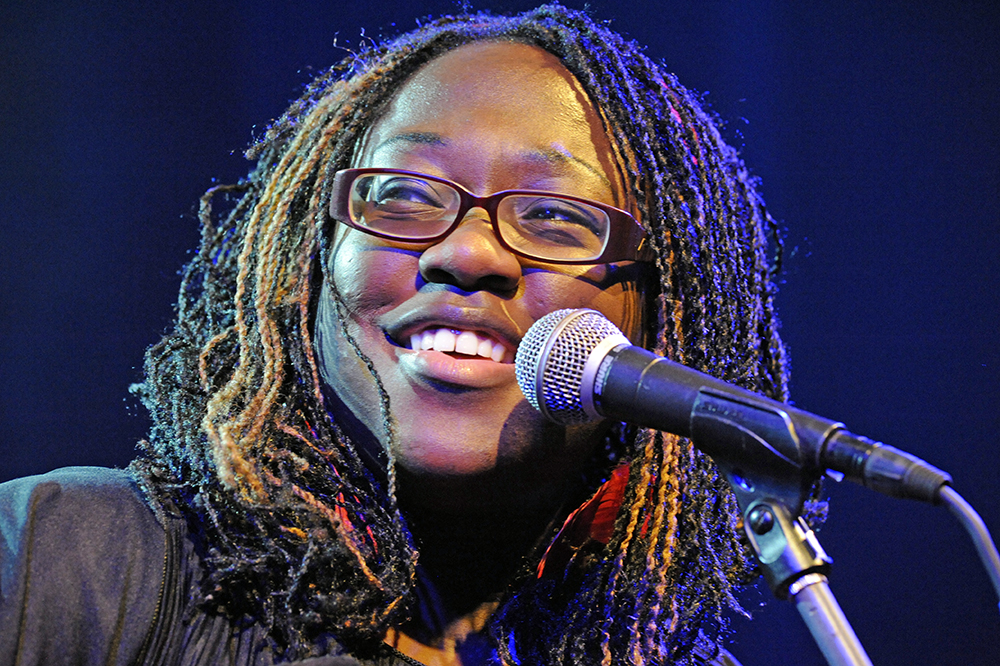
Concert in Warsaw, Poland - S.O.S. Haiti.

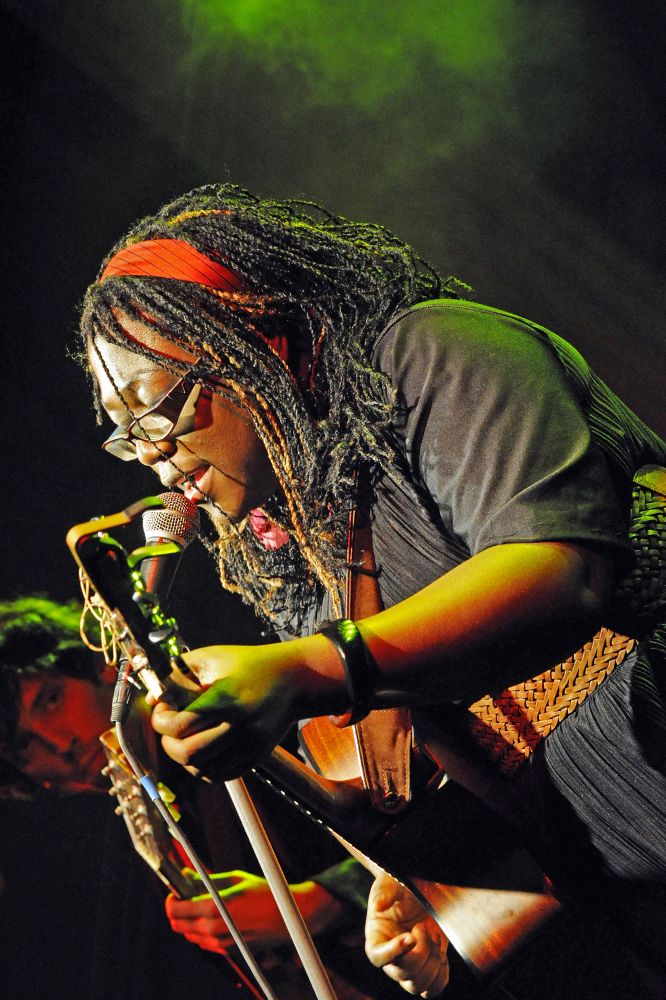
January 2011 in Warsaw, Poland.

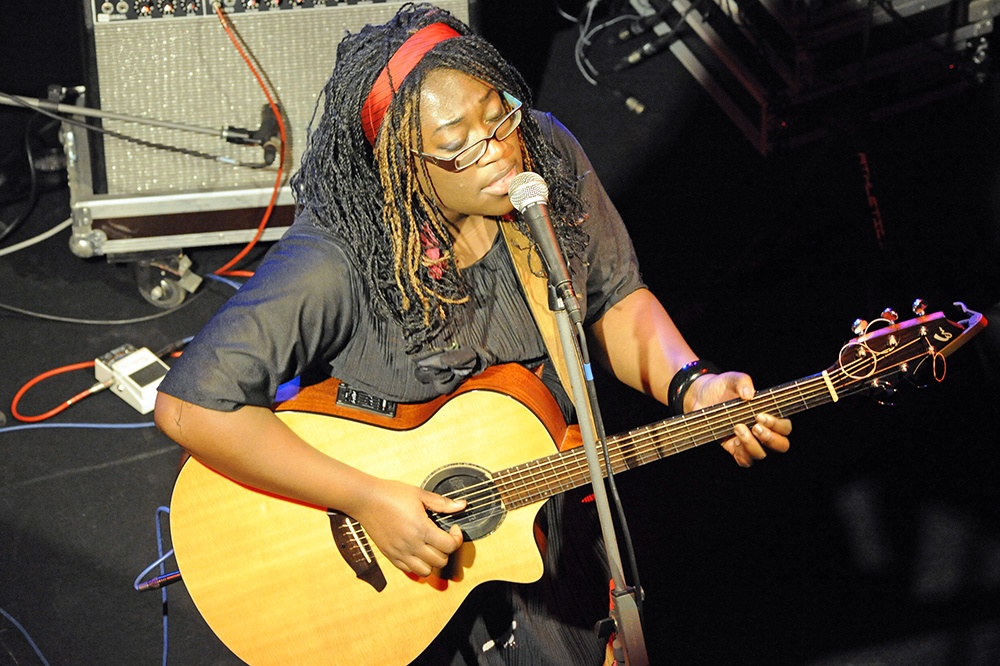
Charity performance in Warsaw in support of the victims of the 2010 earthquake.
