= 1957–58 Scottish Cup =

Tournament details
- Country: Scotland

Final positions
- Champions: Clyde
- Runners-up: Hibernian

The 1957–58 Scottish Cup was the 73rd staging of Scotland's most prestigious football knockout competition. The Cup was won by Clyde who defeated Hibernian in the final.

== First round ==
Home team	Score	Away team
Airdrieonians	3 – 4	Celtic
Albion Rovers	3 – 1	Berwick Rangers
Alloa Athletic	0 – 2	Dunfermline Athletic
Ayr United	1 – 1	St Mirren
Brechin City	1 – 1	Montrose
Chirnside United	0 – 4	Third Lanark
Cowdenbeath	1 – 3	Rangers
Dumbarton	0 – 5	Clyde
East Fife	1 – 2	Hearts
East Stirlingshire	3 – 7	Motherwell
Falkirk	2 – 0	Hamilton Academical
Raith Rovers	4 – 0	Peebles Rovers
Stranraer	6 – 2	Eyemouth United

=== Replays ===
Home team	Score	Away team
Montrose	3 – 1	Brechin City
St Mirren	2 – 1	Ayr United

== Second round ==
Home team	Score	Away team
Celtic	7 – 2	Stirling Albion
Clyde	4 – 0	Arbroath
Dundee United	0 – 0	Hibernian
Falkirk	6 – 3	St Johnstone
Forfar Athletic	1 – 9	Rangers
Hearts	4 – 1	Albion Rovers
Inverness Caledonian	5 – 2	Stenhousemuir
Kilmarnock	7 – 0	Vale of Leithen
Montrose	2 – 2	Buckie Thistle
Greenock Morton	0 – 1	Aberdeen
Motherwell	2 – 2	Partick Thistle
Queen of the South	7 – 0	Stranraer
Queen's Park	7 – 2	Fraserburgh
Raith Rovers	0 – 1	Dundee
St Mirren	1 – 4	Dunfermline Athletic
Third Lanark	6 – 1	Lossiemouth

=== Replays ===
Home team	Score	Away team
Buckie Thistle	4 – 1	Montrose
Hibernian	2 – 0	Dundee United
Partick Thistle	0 – 4	Motherwell

== Third round ==
Home team	Score	Away team
Buckie Thistle	1 – 2	Falkirk
Clyde	2 – 0	Celtic
Dundee	1 – 3	Aberdeen
Dunfermline Athletic	1 – 2	Rangers
Hearts	3 – 4	Hibernian
Inverness Caledonian	0 – 7	Motherwell
Kilmarnock	2 – 2	Queen of the South
Third Lanark	5 – 3	Queen's Park

=== Replays ===
Home team	Score	Away team
Queen of the South	3 – 0	Kilmarnock

== Quarter-finals ==
Home team	Score	Away team
Clyde	2 – 1	Falkirk
Hibernian	3 – 2	Third Lanark
Motherwell	2 – 1	Aberdeen
Queen of the South	3 – 4	Rangers

== Semi-finals ==
5 April 1958

Clyde	3–2	Motherwell

Celtic Park, Glasgow
Attendance: 41,000

5 April 1958

Rangers	2–2	Hibernian
		Aitken; Preston

Hampden Park, Glasgow
Attendance: 76,727

=== Replays ===
9 April 1958

Hibernian	2–1	Rangers
Turnbull (pen.); Fraser

Hampden Park, Glasgow
Attendance: 75,000

== Final ==
26 April 1958

Clyde	1–0	Hibernian
Coyle 28'	Report

Hampden Park, Glasgow
Attendance: 95,123
Referee: Jack Mowat

=== Teams ===
Clyde	Hibernian

GK	1	(Scotland) Tommy McCulloch
RB	2	(Republic of Ireland) Albert Murphy
LB	3	(Scotland) Harry Haddock (c)
RH	4	(Scotland) Joe Walters
CH	5	(Scotland) Willie Finlay
LH	6	(Scotland) Mike Clinton
RW	7	(Scotland) George Herd
IR	8	(Scotland) Dan Currie
CF	9	(Scotland) John Coyle
IL	10	(Scotland) Archie Robertson
LW	11	(Scotland) Tommy Ring
Manager:
(Scotland) Johnny Haddow

GK	1	(Scotland) Lawrie Leslie
RB	2	(Scotland) John Grant
LB	3	(Scotland) Joe McClelland
RH	4	(Scotland) Eddie Turnbull (c)
CH	5	(Scotland) Jackie Plenderleith
LH	6	(Scotland) John Baxter
RW	7	(Scotland) John Fraser
IR	8	(Scotland) Andy Aitken
CF	9	(England) Joe Baker
IL	10	(Scotland) Tommy Preston
LW	11	(Scotland) Willie Ormond
Manager:
(Scotland) Hugh Shaw

== See also ==
- 1957–58 in Scottish football
- 1957–58 Scottish League Cup
