= Tommy Preston =

Scottish footballer (1932–2015)

Personal information
- Full name: Thomas Baxter Preston
- Date of birth: 3 October 1932
- Place of birth: Longstone, Edinburgh, Scotland
- Date of death: 16 April 2015 (aged 82)
- Place of death: Edinburgh, Scotland
- Position: Inside forward

Senior career*
Years	Team	Apps	(Gls)
- Newtongrange Star
1953–1964	Hibernian	225	(35)
1964–1965	St Mirren	1	(0)
Total		226	(35)
- * Club domestic league appearances and goals

Thomas Baxter Preston (3 October 1932 – 16 April 2015) was a Scottish footballer who played as an inside forward for Hibernian and St Mirren. Preston appeared for Hibernian in the 1958 Scottish Cup Final and made over 300 appearances for the club in all competitions. He also scored a goal in a famous victory for Hibs against FC Barcelona.

Preston died in April 2015, aged 82.
