= No Format! =

French independent record label

- Founded: 2004
- Founder: Laurent Bizot
- Country of origin: France
- Location: Paris
- Official website: www.noformat.net

No Format! (stylized as NØ FØRMAT!) is an independent record label based in Paris founded in 2004 by Laurent Bizot, later joined in 2007 by Thibaut Mullings.

The primary focus of the label was to invest in original musical projects, whether instrumental or vocal. No Format has an extensive catalog of 22 works.

The label's repertoire features collaborations between artists with a traditional west African musical background and artists more familiar with Western traditions For example, they have released albums such as (Chamber Music by Ballaké Sissoko and Vincent Segal) which showcase the fusion of these diverse musical influences. Additionally, No Format! has also released albums by singer-songwriters (Chocolate Genius, Inc., Mélissa Laveaux or Solo Piano by Chilly Gonzales to name a few).

In 2016, No Format! was selected by IMPALA (the Independent Music Companies Association) and The Independent Echo for the FIVEUNDERFIFTEEN campaign highlighting the label's promising presence in the music industry.

Since 2016, No Format! has released and distributed over 46 albums, EPs, and singles in partnership with the many of its signed artists.

== Artists ==
- ALA.NI
- Ballaké Sissoko and Vincent Segal
- Chocolate Genius, Inc.
- Faya Dub
- Chilly Gonzales
- Kyrie Kristmanson
- Lansiné Kouyaté and David Neerman
- Julia Sarr
- Mamani Keïta
- Mélissa Laveaux
- Misja Fitzgerald Michel
- Nicolas Repac
- Rocé
- Gerald Toto, Richard Bona, Lokua Kanza
