= Jackie Plenderleith =

Scottish footballer (born 1937)

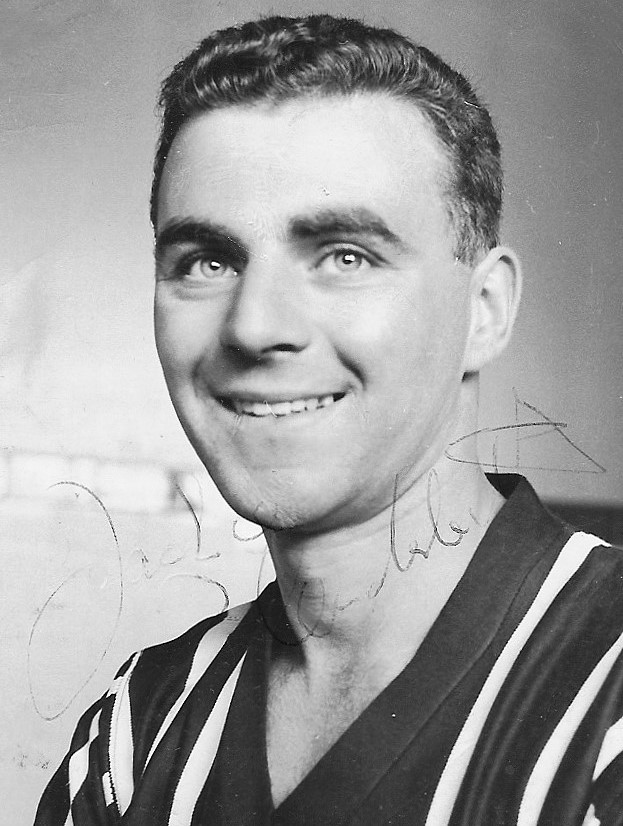
- Plenderleith in the 1960s

Personal information
- Full name: John Boyd Plenderleith
- Date of birth: 6 October 1937 (age 89)
- Place of birth: Bellshill, Scotland
- Position: Centre half

Youth career
- Armadale Thistle

Senior career*
Years	Team	Apps	(Gls)
1954–1960	Hibernian	123	(0)
1960–1963	Manchester City	41	(0)
1963	Cape Town City	20	(0)
1963–1964	Queen of the South	5	(0)
1964–1966	Cape Town City	49	(0)
1966	Bloemfontein City	15	(0)
1967–1968	Hellenic	16	(0)

International career
1957–1959	Scotland U23	5	(0)
1960	Scotland	1	(0)
- * Club domestic league appearances and goals

Jackie Plenderleith (born 6 October 1937) is a Scottish former footballer, who played for Hibernian, Manchester City and Queen of the South amongst others. Plenderleith was capped once by the Scotland national football team.
