= John Coyle (footballer) =

Scottish footballer

Personal information
- Full name: John Cohen Coyle
- Date of birth: 28 September 1932
- Date of death: 14 May 2016 (aged 83)
- Position: Centre forward

Senior career*
Years	Team	Apps	(Gls)
- Dundee St. Joseph's
1950–1957	Dundee United	96	(78)
1952–1953	→ Brechin City (loan)		
1957–1960	Clyde	64	(45)
- Cambridge City
- * Club domestic league appearances and goals

John Cohen Coyle (28 September 1932 –14 May 2016) was a Scottish footballer.

Coyle started his career with Dundee United for whom he signed in 1950. His early years were interrupted by his National Service, while he also spent time on loan to Brechin City. As a result, by the beginning of the 1955-56 season he had made only eight first team appearances. From that point onwards however, his form was a revelation, with 77 goals in 88 appearances in the following two and a half seasons.

Despite Coyle's goals, United could do no better than mid-table mediocrity in Division Two and when Clyde expressed interest in December 1957, Coyle expressed his desire to move to the Division One side. An £8,000 deal was concluded and Coyle moved to Glasgow where he made an immediate impression with the Bully Wee, scoring frequently during the second half of the 1957-58 season. He also scored the winning goal in the 1958 Scottish Cup Final, as Clyde defeated Hibernian 1–0 at Hampden Park.

Coyle's meteoric rise was confirmed when he was selected in the Scotland squad for the 1958 FIFA World Cup that summer. He did not make an appearance during the finals in Sweden however and indeed never actually played for the Scotland national side.

Coyle's younger brother Jimmy was also a professional footballer, being signed for Dundee United during the same period as his brother (Jimmy Reid and two other players also made the move at the same time) and playing alongside him at Tannadice Park for a season.

He died on 14 May 2016.
