= 1957–58 Scottish Division One =

52nd season of top-tier football league in Scotland

Scottish Division One
- Season: 1957–58
- Champions: Heart of Midlothian
- Relegated: East Fife; Queen's Park

The 1957–58 Scottish Division One was a football tournament won by Heart of Midlothian, who scored a record number of goals in a single season and became the only club to have a goal difference exceeding 100. East Fife and Queen's Park finished 17th and 18th respectively and were relegated to the 1958–59 Scottish Division Two.

== League table ==
Pos	Team	Pld	W	D	L	GF	GA	GR	Pts
1	Heart of Midlothian	34	29	4	1	132	29	4.552	62
2	Rangers	34	22	5	7	89	49	1.816	49
3	Celtic	34	19	8	7	84	47	1.787	46
4	Clyde	34	18	6	10	84	61	1.377	42
5	Kilmarnock	34	14	9	11	60	55	1.091	37
6	Partick Thistle	34	17	3	14	69	71	0.972	37
7	Raith Rovers	34	14	7	13	66	56	1.179	35
8	Motherwell	34	12	8	14	68	67	1.015	32
9	Hibernian	34	13	5	16	59	60	0.983	31
10	Falkirk	34	11	9	14	64	82	0.780	31
11	Dundee	34	13	5	16	49	65	0.754	31
12	Aberdeen	34	14	2	18	68	76	0.895	30
13	St Mirren	34	11	8	15	59	66	0.894	30
14	Third Lanark	34	13	4	17	69	88	0.784	30
15	Queen of the South	34	12	5	17	61	72	0.847	29
16	Airdrieonians	34	13	2	19	71	92	0.772	28
17	East Fife	34	10	3	21	45	88	0.511	23
18	Queen's Park	34	4	1	29	41	114	0.360	9

Source: RSSSF

== Results ==
Home \ Away	ABE	AIR	CEL	CLY	DND	EFI	FAL	HOM	HIB	KIL	MOT	PAR	QOS	QPA	RAI	RAN	STM	THI
Aberdeen		5–1	0–1	2–1	3–0	6–2	1–2	0–4	0–1	1–2	4–3	1–3	3–4	5–2	3–2	1–2	3–1	2–4
Airdrieonians	2–6		2–5	2–2	7–1	2–1	6–2	2–7	1–4	2–1	4–1	4–1	2–1	2–2	2–1	3–4	2–3	2–3
Celtic	1–1	4–2		6–2	0–0	4–0	2–2	0–2	4–0	4–0	2–2	2–3	1–2	5–1	1–1	0–1	2–2	4–1
Clyde	3–1	3–1	3–6		3–1	2–1	5–0	2–1	2–1	3–2	4–1	6–1	3–1	2–3	6–2	1–3	2–1	1–1
Dundee	1–2	1–3	5–3	2–0		2–0	2–4	0–5	3–0	2–0	3–0	5–0	2–1	1–0	0–2	1–2	0–0	2–0
East Fife	3–2	0–6	0–3	1–3	3–1		2–1	0–3	2–3	1–2	2–1	2–2	1–2	4–0	2–2	0–1	1–2	0–6
Falkirk	4–4	3–0	0–1	1–1	0–2	4–1		0–4	1–3	1–1	1–1	1–2	1–1	3–2	3–2	0–4	3–1	4–2
Heart of Midlothian	4–0	4–0	5–3	2–2	6–0	9–0	9–1		3–1	2–1	2–2	4–1	3–1	8–0	4–1	2–1	5–1	7–2
Hibernian	0–1	4–0	0–1	1–3	1–1	0–1	3–3	0–2		1–2	2–1	5–1	1–2	2–0	2–2	3–1	5–5	4–0
Kilmarnock	2–0	3–1	1–1	3–2	1–1	4–0	1–1	1–1	1–4		0–1	4–1	2–0	3–1	1–1	3–3	4–2	2–4
Motherwell	4–1	1–2	1–3	1–1	1–0	2–0	2–5	0–4	3–1	2–2		4–1	4–2	4–1	0–2	2–2	4–2	1–2
Partick Thistle	1–0	2–0	0–1	2–2	2–0	5–1	3–0	1–3	2–0	2–0	3–2		4–3	1–4	3–2	1–2	3–2	2–3
Queen of the South	1–2	3–2	4–3	0–3	4–0	0–3	2–2	1–4	3–0	1–2	1–2	1–3		2–1	1–1	1–1	2–2	6–1
Queen's Park	2–5	1–3	0–3	1–4	2–7	1–4	0–2	1–4	1–2	1–2	0–7	0–6	3–0		2–3	2–4	0–1	1–3
Raith Rovers	0–1	4–0	1–2	5–0	4–0	0–2	4–1	0–3	2–0	1–1	1–1	3–2	3–1	3–1		1–3	1–0	4–2
Rangers	5–0	1–2	2–3	2–0	0–1	3–3	3–2	2–3	3–1	3–4	2–2	2–0	4–2	5–1	4–1		1–0	5–1
St Mirren	3–1	5–0	1–1	1–0	1–1	3–0	2–1	2–3	2–3	2–1	1–3	1–1	1–2	3–1	0–4	1–3		2–2
Third Lanark	3–1	3–1	0–2	2–5	5–1	1–2	3–5	0–0	1–1	2–1	4–2	1–4	2–3	1–3	2–0	1–5	1–3	

Legend: Blue = home team win; Yellow = draw; Red = away team win.
