= New Life (Antonio Sánchez album) =

Studio album by Antonio Sánchez
- Released: February 26, 2013
- Recorded: January 3–31, 2012
- Studio: MSR Studios, NYC
- Genre: Jazz
- Length: 72:26
- Label: CAM Jazz CAMJ 7856-2
- Producer: Antonio Sánchez, Ermanno Basso

Antonio Sánchez chronology
Live in New York at Jazz Standard (2010)	New Life (2013)	Birdman (2014)

New Life is an album by drummer Antonio Sánchez which was released on the CAM Jazz label in 2013.

== Reception ==
Professional ratings
Review scores
Source	Rating
Allmusic	4/5 stars
The Irish Times	4/5 stars
All About Jazz	4/5 stars
All About Jazz	4.5/5 stars

The Allmusic review stated "Antonio Sanchez's third solo album is a forward-thinking collection of jazz originals that features an all-star group of musicians ... Sanchez's music often walks the line between layered, atmospheric contemporary jazz and more aggressive, avant-garde-leaning group improvisation". In The Irish Times, Cormac Larkin noted "the Mexican’s third album as leader reveals a more thoughtful side. There is still enough pyrotechnics to burn down the average house, but the former classical pianist’s tunes are far more than just excuses to display his chops, and the group he has assembled to play them features some of the most expressive, forward-thinking musicians on the New York scene". On All About Jazz, Phil Barnes observed "Sanchez takes his cues from the spiritual jazz of the late 1960s and early 1970s—the opening tracks echo Coltrane and Pharoah Sanders for example, but this top band pulls them in different directions updating them for today while maintaining that emotional pull ... The good news is that the album has enough depth and feeling to hold your interest through multiple plays over an extended period, and that in our instant, commodified, culture is something worth celebrating" while John Kelman noted "With New Life, Sanchez the composer and bandleader has caught up with Sanchez the player, and if he's learned another thing from his tenure with Metheny it's how to write tunes that are compelling and downright accessible, despite being unequivocally challenging under the hood" In JazzTimes Lloyd Sachs said "The tunes, which reflect Sanchez's drumming with their taut strength and eruptive power, give two of jazz's hottest saxophonists, altoist David Binney and tenorist Donny McCaslin, all they can handle: soaring melodies, rich harmonies, clever structures, meaty unison parts".

== Track listing ==
All compositions by Antonio Sánchez.

1. "Uprisings and Revolutions" – 8:51
2. "Minotauro" – 8:53
3. "New Life" – 14:23
4. "Nighttime Story" – 6:39
5. "Medusa" – 8:24
6. "The Real McDaddy" – 8:52
7. "Air" – 7:39
8. "Family Ties" – 8:45

== Personnel ==
- Antonio Sánchez – drums, keyboards, vocals
- Dave Binney – alto saxophone
- Donny McCaslin – tenor saxophone
- John Escreet – piano, electric piano
- Matt Brewer – bass, electric bass
- Thana Alexa – vocals
