= Bad Hombre =

Studio album by Antonio Sánchez & Migration
- Released: September 29, 2017
- Studio: Avatar, New York City
- Genre: Jazz
- Length: 55:29
- Label: CAM Jazz CAMJ 7890-2
- Producer: Antonio Sánchez

Antonio Sánchez chronology
The Meridian Suite (2015)	Bad Hombre (2017)

Professional ratings
Review scores
Source	Rating
All About Jazz	4.5/5 stars
PopMatters	9/10 stars
Financial Times	4/5 stars
The Irish Times	4/5 stars

Bad Hombre is a studio album by drummer Antonio Sánchez released on September 29, 2017 via CAM Jazz label. This is his sixth album as a leader. In 2018, the album was nominated for Grammy Award for Best Contemporary Instrumental Album.

== Reception ==
Mike Hobart of Financial Times stated "Here, he develops his grasp of the cinematic with an atmospheric and imaginative solo recording that envelops beautifully formed drum creations with layers of keyboards and electronica. The album begins with a scratchy recording of Sanchez’ grandfather reading poetry backed by a mariachi band. Mexican roots established, crisp funky beats deliver a platform for the narratives that follow. These are tense and compelling, with a range from the speculative and dreamy to the nightmarish and irate."

Cormac Larkin of The Irish Times wrote "Bad Hombre—named for the alter ego he adopts therein—is a bravura display of contemporary acoustic drumming overlaid with a pungent, densely mixed soup of keyboards, electronic noise and voice, the answer to the question: if a great drummer can play anything he wants, what does he play?"

== Track listing ==
All tracks are written by Antonio Sánchez.

No.	Title	Length
1.	"Bad Hombre Intro"	1:45
2.	"Bad Hombre"	5:29
3.	"Fire Trail"	8:07
4.	"Distant Glow"	4:56
5.	"Bbo"	5:52
6.	"Momentum"	7:16
7.	"Home"	4:49
8.	"The Crossing"	4:56
9.	"Nine Lives"	6:40
10.	"Antisocial"	5:26

== Personnel ==
- Antonio Sanchez – composer, producer, liner notes, drums, keyboards, electronics, voice, engineering, mixing, cover (concept)
- Ignacio López Tarso – performer (track 1)
- Justin Bettman – photographer
- Pete Karam – mixing, mastering
- Ermanno Basso – executive producer
- Thana Alexa – cover (design)
