= Antonio Sánchez (drummer) =

Mexican-American jazz drummer (born 1971)

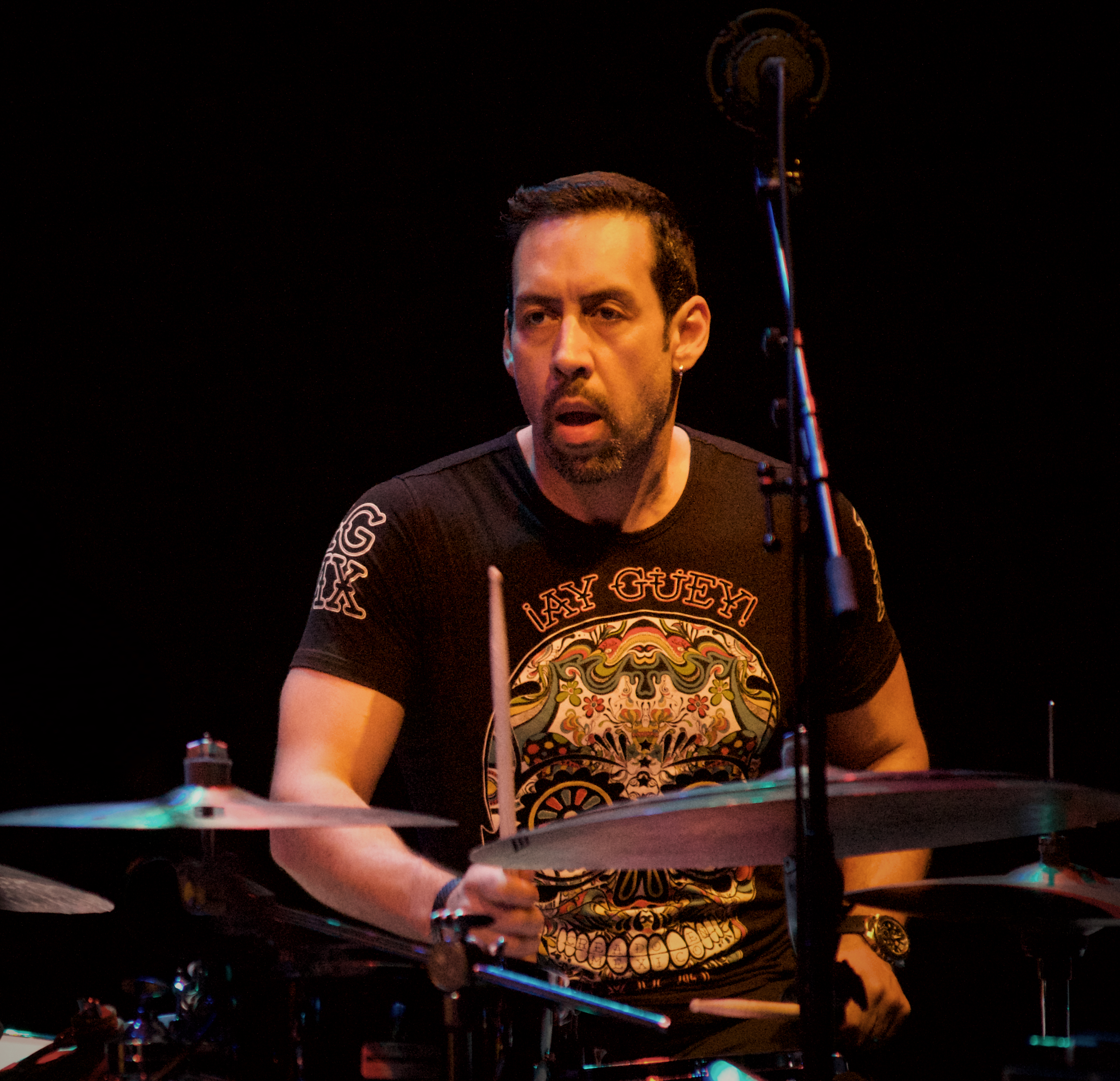
- Sánchez in 2019

Background information
- Born: November 1, 1971 (age 54); Mexico City, Mexico
- Genres: Jazz
- Occupations: Musician, composer
- Instrument: Drums
- Label: CAM Jazz
- Website: antoniosanchez.net

Antonio Sánchez (born November 1, 1971) is a Mexican-American jazz drummer. He is best known for his work with jazz guitarist Pat Metheny and as a composer of the film score for the 2014 film Birdman. The score earned him a nomination for the Golden Globe Award for Best Original Score and BAFTA Award for Best Film Music; he won a Grammy Award for Best Score Soundtrack for Visual Media, the Critics' Choice Movie Award for Best Score, and the Satellite Award for Best Original Score.

== Early life and education ==
Sánchez was born in Mexico City and started playing drums at the age of five. By his teen years, he had already begun playing professionally. He attained a degree in classical piano from the National Conservatory in 1993 and then moved to Boston, Massachusetts, to study at Berklee College of Music. After he graduated magna cum laude in jazz studies, Sánchez obtained a scholarship for a master's degree in jazz improvisation at Boston's New England Conservatory of Music. He is the grandson of Mexican actor Ignacio López Tarso.

== Career ==
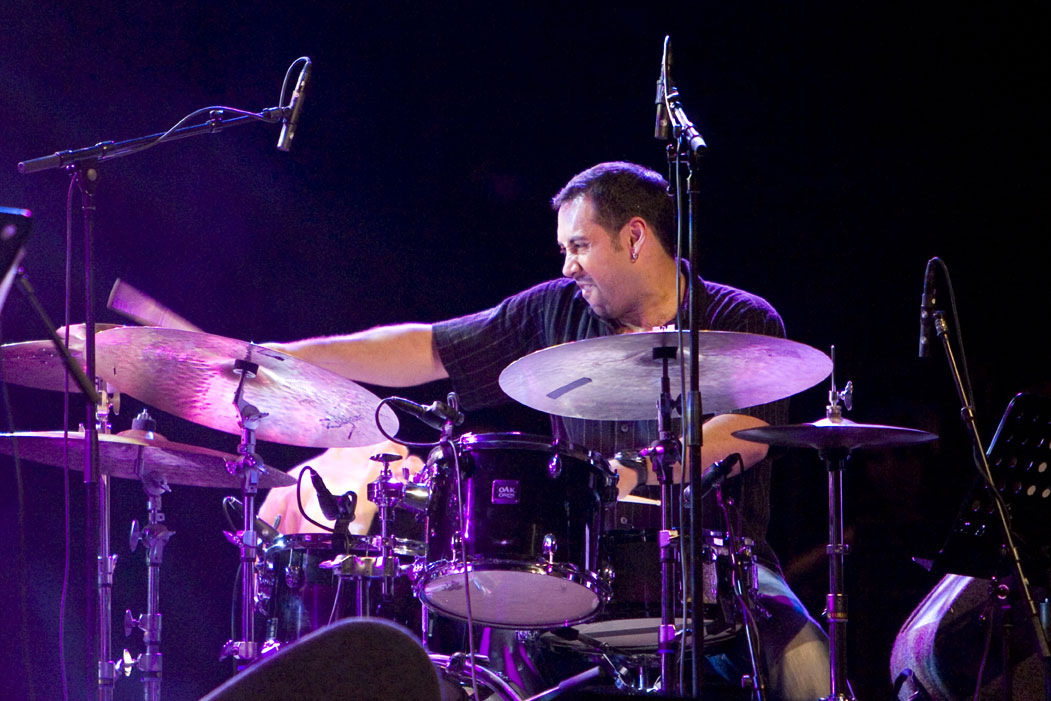
Sánchez performing at the 2007 North Sea Jazz Festival.

While Sánchez was still at the Conservatory in 1997, his teacher, Danilo Pérez, recommended him to Paquito D'Rivera for the drum chair in Dizzy Gillespie's United Nations Orchestra, which led to him touring with the orchestra. Later in 1997, Perez invited Sánchez to be a part of his acoustic trio which resulted in extensive touring, and the recording of the Grammy Award-nominated album Motherland. The tour resulted in him being heard by guitarist Pat Metheny who invited Sánchez to join the Pat Metheny Group as its drummer after a series of auditions.

The group recorded two albums with Sánchez. The first one, Speaking of Now, won a Grammy Award for Best Contemporary Jazz Album in 2003. A DVD, under the same name, documenting the tour has been released. The second album, The Way Up, was released in January 2005. Sánchez has been a part of various quartets and trios under Metheny's direction. The Pat Metheny Trio (Metheny on guitar, Sánchez on drums, and Christian McBride on bass) released Day Trip in January 2008 to wide acclaim among jazz critics. In 2012, he was the drummer on Pat Metheny's album Unity Band.

In 2006, Sánchez joined the faculty of New York University (NYU). The next year, he recorded his first solo album, Migration, on CAM Jazz. The album includes Pat Metheny, Chick Corea, Chris Potter, David Sánchez, and Scott Colley. All About Jazz called it "One of the best debuts of 2007." Sánchez said of the album: "I didn't want people to say this is a drummer's album...I wanted it to be something that could be from any instrumentalist. I thought in terms of music, not how many solos I got and if I blew enough chops or not. I wanted the music to be very melodic and accessible and with a lot of really good interplay."

In 2010, Sánchez released his second solo album, Live in New York at Jazz Standard, to positive reviews. The double live album was recorded at the Jazz Standard in New York City after a U.S. tour of Antonio's band, which included Miguel Zenón on alto saxophone, David Sánchez on tenor saxophone, and Scott Colley on acoustic bass guitar.

The year 2013 marked the release of his third solo album. New Life was recorded in January 2012. It includes 8 original compositions and features Thana Alexa on vocals, David Binney on alto saxophone, Donny McCaslin on tenor saxophone, John Escreet on piano and Matt Brewer on bass. All his solo albums have been released under the Cam Jazz label.

In 2014, Sánchez composed the film score for Birdman. The soundtrack album was released on October 14, 2014. The score earned him nominations for the Golden Globe Award for Best Original Score, BAFTA Award for Best Film Music, and other nominations; he won the Critics' Choice Movie Award for Best Score and Satellite Award for Best Original Score. However, he was disqualified to compete for the Academy Award for Best Original Score, since the film also contained a significant amount of classical music.

Sánchez's 2017 album, Bad Hombre, earned him a Grammy Nomination for Best Contemporary Instrumental Album.

Sánchez continued working with the Pat Metheny band in 2019 as they toured extensively and released an album of new material in 2020 entitled From This Place.

Sánchez's 2022 album, SHIFT (Bad Hombre Vol. II), sees Sánchez joining forces with a diverse range of collaborators, including Trent Reznor & Atticus Ross, Dave Matthews & Pat Metheny, Rodrigo y Gabriela, Meshell Ndegeocello, Kimbra, Lila Downs, Ana Tijoux, Becca Stevens, Silvana Estrada, MARO and Thana Alexa.

For 2026 Grammy Awards, he received a nomination for the album BEATrio in the Best Contemporary Instrumental Album category.

== Equipment ==
Sánchez plays Yamaha drums, Remo drumheads, and Zildjian cymbals and sticks, as well as LP Percussion exclusively.

== Discography ==
=== As leader ===
- Migration (CAM Jazz, 2007)
- Live in New York at Jazz Standard (CAM Jazz, 2010)
- New Life (CAM Jazz, 2013)
- Birdman (Milan, 2014)
- Three Times Three (CAM Jazz, 2015)
- The Meridian Suite (CAM Jazz, 2015)
- Bad Hombre (CAM Jazz, 2017)
- Lines in the Sand (CAM Jazz, 2019)
- SHIFT (Bad Hombre Vol. II) (Warner Music, 2022)

=== As sideman ===
With Ralph Bowen

- Dedicated (Posi-Tone, 2009)
- Due Reverence (Posi-Tone, 2010)

With Michael Brecker

- Wide Angles (Verve, 2003)

With Dewa Budjana

- Hasta Karma (Moonjune, 2015)

With Gary Burton

- Quartet Live (Concord Jazz, 2009)
- Common Ground (Mack Avenue, 2011)
- Guided Tour (Mack Avenue, 2013)

With Avishai Cohen

- Unity (Stretch, 2001)

With Scott Colley

- Architect of the Silent Moment (CAM Jazz, 2005 [2007])

With Chick Corea

- Dr. Joe (Stretch, 2008)

With Bendik Hofseth

- XI (Grappa, 2009)

With Pat Metheny

- Speaking of Now (Nonesuch, 2002)
- The Way Up (Nonesuch, 2005)
- Day Trip (Nonesuch, 2008)
- Tokyo Day Trip (Nonesuch, 2008)
- Unity Band (Nonesuch, 2012)
- Tap: Book of Angels Volume 20 (Tzadik/Nonesuch, 2013)
- Kin (↔) (Nonesuch, 2014)
- The Unity Sessions (Nonesuch, 2016)
- From This Place (Nonesuch, 2020)

With Enrico Pieranunzi

- Latin Jazz Quintet Live at Birdland (Cam Jazz, 2010)
- Permutation (Cam Jazz, 2012)
- Stories (Cam Jazz, 2014)

With Béla Fleck and Edmar Castañeda

- BEATrio (Thirty Tigers, 2025)

With Evgeny Pobozhiy

- Elements For Peace (Butman Music, 2022)

With Alex Sipiagin

- Returning (Criss Cross, 2005)
- Prints (Criss Cross, 2007)
- Generations (Criss Cross, 2010)

== Film and TV credits ==
- Birdman
- Get Shorty (TV series) (3 seasons)
- Política: Manual de Instrucciones (2016 documentary)
- Harami (2020 film)
- The Anarchists (TV series) (HBO)
- Stags (TV series) (6 episodes. Paramount +)
- The Studio (TV series) (10 Episodes. Apple +) (2025 Emmy Nomination for Best Score)
