= Kin (Pat Metheny album) =

KIN (←→)

Studio album by Pat Metheny Unity Group
- Released: February 3, 2014
- Recorded: June 2013
- Studios: MSR Studios, New York City
- Genre: Jazz
- Length: 70:16
- Label: Nonesuch
- Producer: Pat Metheny

Pat Metheny chronology
| Tap: Book of Angels Volume 20 (2013) | KIN (←→) (2014) | The Unity Sessions (2016) |

Kin (stylized as KIN (←→)) is a studio album by American jazz guitarist Pat Metheny and his Unity Group, an expanded version of 2012's Unity Band, with multi-instrumentalist Giulio Carmassi and saxophonist Chris Potter. Kin was released in February 2014 by Nonesuch Records. It was recorded in June 2013 at MSR Studios in New York.

== Background ==
Metheny has said that his idea behind Kin was to push the quartet-led concept that led to Unity Band further forward by adding more orchestration to the instrumental core of the band, so that Kin would be "more like the Technicolor, IMAX version of what a band like this could be—but with that hardcore thing still sitting right in the middle of it all." The album also re-explores the concepts of world view, unity and the global village explored on previous Pat Metheny Group albums such as Letter from Home and We Live Here.

Professional ratings
Review scores
| Source | Rating |
|---|---|
| Allmusic | 4/5 stars |
| Tom Hull | B− |

== Reception ==
The reviewer Thom Jurek of AllMusic.com awarded the album 4 stars. Geoffrey Himes at JazzTimes wrote, "Melody writing is the most underrated skill in jazz today, perhaps because it's also the rarest. There are thousands of jazz musicians who congratulate themselves on writing in 7/4 and 9/4 and on shifting their solos from tonal to atonal and back again. But how many of them can write a ballad that someone might want to hum to a lover?" Rob Mallows of London Jazz News wrote, "The album gives the listener a full understanding of what Metheny, now nearly sixty, is all about and where he feels comfortable in his role as grand master of contemporary jazz."

== Track listing ==
All music is composed by Pat Metheny.

| No. | Title | Length |
|---|---|---|
| 1. | "On Day One" | 15:16 |
| 2. | "Rise Up" | 11:57 |
| 3. | "Adagia" | 2:14 |
| 4. | "Sign of the Season" | 10:14 |
| 5. | "KIN (←→)" | 11:06 |
| 6. | "Born" | 7:51 |
| 7. | "Genealogy" | 0:38 |
| 8. | "We Go On" | 5:33 |
| 9. | "Kqu" | 5:27 |
| Total length: | | 70:16 |

== Personnel ==
- Pat Metheny – acoustic and electric guitars, guitar synthesizer, electronics, orchestrionics, synthesizers
- Chris Potter – tenor saxophone, soprano saxophone, clarinet, bass clarinet, alto flute, bass flute
- Giulio Carmassi – piano, trumpet, trombone, French horn, cello, vibraphone, clarinet, flute, recorder, alto saxophone, Wurlitzer, whistling, vocals
- Ben Williams – acoustic and electric bass
- Antonio Sánchez – drums and cajón

== Charts ==
| Chart (2014) | Peak position |
|---|---|
| Belgian Albums (Ultratop Flanders) | 66 |
| Belgian Albums (Ultratop Wallonia) | 100 |
| Dutch Albums (Album Top 100) | 65 |
| French Albums (SNEP) | 161 |
| German Albums (Offizielle Top 100) | 64 |
| Italian Albums (FIMI) | 14 |
| Polish Albums (ZPAV) | 21 |
| Portuguese Albums (AFP) | 24 |
| Spanish Albums (Promusicae) | 66 |
| UK Jazz & Blues Albums (Official Charts) | 3 |
| US Billboard 200 | 50 |
| US Top Jazz Albums (Billboard) | 1 |
