= The Meridian Suite =

Studio album by Antonio Sánchez
- Released: July 24, 2015
- Recorded: December 15–17, 2014
- Studios: Avatar, New York City
- Genre: Jazz
- Length: 55:29
- Label: CAM Jazz
- Producer: Antonio Sánchez

Antonio Sánchez chronology
Three Times Three (2015)	The Meridian Suite (2015)	Bad Hombre (2017)

The Meridian Suite is an album by jazz drummer Antonio Sánchez which was released by CAM Jazz in 2015.

== Reception ==
Professional ratings
Review scores
Source	Rating
PopMatters	8/10 stars
The Irish Times	4/5 stars

The PopMatters review by John Garrett stated "Sánchez doesn't use the Meridian Suite to show off much fancy stickwork. The real meat and power of Migration's sound comes from Blake playing overtop Escreet's Fender Rhodes electric piano. Everyone involved is pulling their weight, yes, but there's something about the teamwork of Blake and Escreet that helps place Meridian Suite on the top of the heap of modern fusion". In The Irish Times, Cormac Larkin noted "Sanchez has through- composed this five-part suite that roams freely over a wide musical plain, referencing everything from hard-swinging Coltrane pedal-point to funked-out Weather Report fusion. More of this, please". In Modern Drummer Terry Branam said "The Meridian Suite takes the listener on a spectacular journey through a nearly hour-long composition that’s divided into five parts. This epic long-form piece features some of Sanchez’s most refined yet most adventurous playing to date". In The New York Times Nate Chinen wrote "Mr. Sánchez has developed a keen sense of scale as a composer, and he pushes it to the limit here". On All About Jazz, Doug Collette observed "In keeping with Antonio Sanchez' multi-faceted ownership of this project, the leader's playing is as authoritative within this structured setting as in the looser atmosphere of the other album: the composer/bandleader simultaneously underlines the melodic and rhythmic motifs of each interval and, at the same time, maintains a flexibility that allows his counterparts to express their personalities as fully as he does".

== Track listing ==
All compositions by Antonio Sánchez except where noted

1. "Grids and Patterns" – 11:25
2. "Imaginary Lines" (lyrics by Thana Alexa) – 10:30
3. "Channels of Energy" – 8:25
4. "Magnetic Currents" – 3:53
5. "Pathways of the Mind" – 21:16

== Personnel ==
- Antonio Sánchez – drums, keyboards, vocals
- Seamus Blake – tenor saxophone, electronic wind instrument
- John Escreet – piano, Rhodes piano
- Adam Rogers – guitar
- Matt Brewer – double bass, bass guitar
- Thana Alexa – vocals
