= Live in New York at Jazz Standard =

Live album by Antonio Sánchez
- Released: September 14, 2010
- Recorded: October 3–5, 2008
- Venue: Jazz Standard, NYC
- Genre: Jazz
- Length: 124:17
- Label: CAM Jazz CAMJ 7826-5
- Producer: Ermanno Basso

Antonio Sánchez chronology
Migration (2007)	Live in New York at Jazz Standard (2010)	New Life (2010)

Live in New York at Jazz Standard is a live album by drummer Antonio Sánchez which was recorded in New York in 2008 and released as a double CD on the CAM Jazz label in 2010.

== Reception ==
Professional ratings
Review scores
Source	Rating
All About Jazz	4/5 stars

On All About Jazz, John Kelman observed "Live in New York at Jazz Standard may not represent where Sanchez is today, but if these performances are any indication, following the drummer beyond his superb sideman work is a must, as his abilities as a composer/bandleader continue to grow in parallel with his rapid upward trajectory as a player." BBC Music's Lara Bellini said "Words can’t quite do justice to how superbly the quartet performs. Sanchez has built a strong rapport with his colleagues, and although he is pivotal in everything, the whole is inarguably greater than the sum ... Live in New York truly marks the passage of Sanchez from sideman to leader".

== Track listing ==
All compositions by Antonio Sánchez except where noted.

Disc One:

1. "Greedy Silence" – 19:05
2. "H and H" (Pat Metheny) – 16:14
3. "Ballade" – 12:09
4. "Revelation" (Miguel Zenón) – 17:39

Disc Two:

1. "It Will Be Better (Once People Get Here)" – 13:36
2. "Did You Get It" – 17:53
3. "The Forgotten Ones" (David Sánchez) – 7:35
4. "Challenge Within" – 20:00

== Personnel ==
- Antonio Sánchez – drums
- Miguel Zenón – alto saxophone
- David Sánchez – tenor saxophone
- Scott Colley – bass
