= John Escreet =

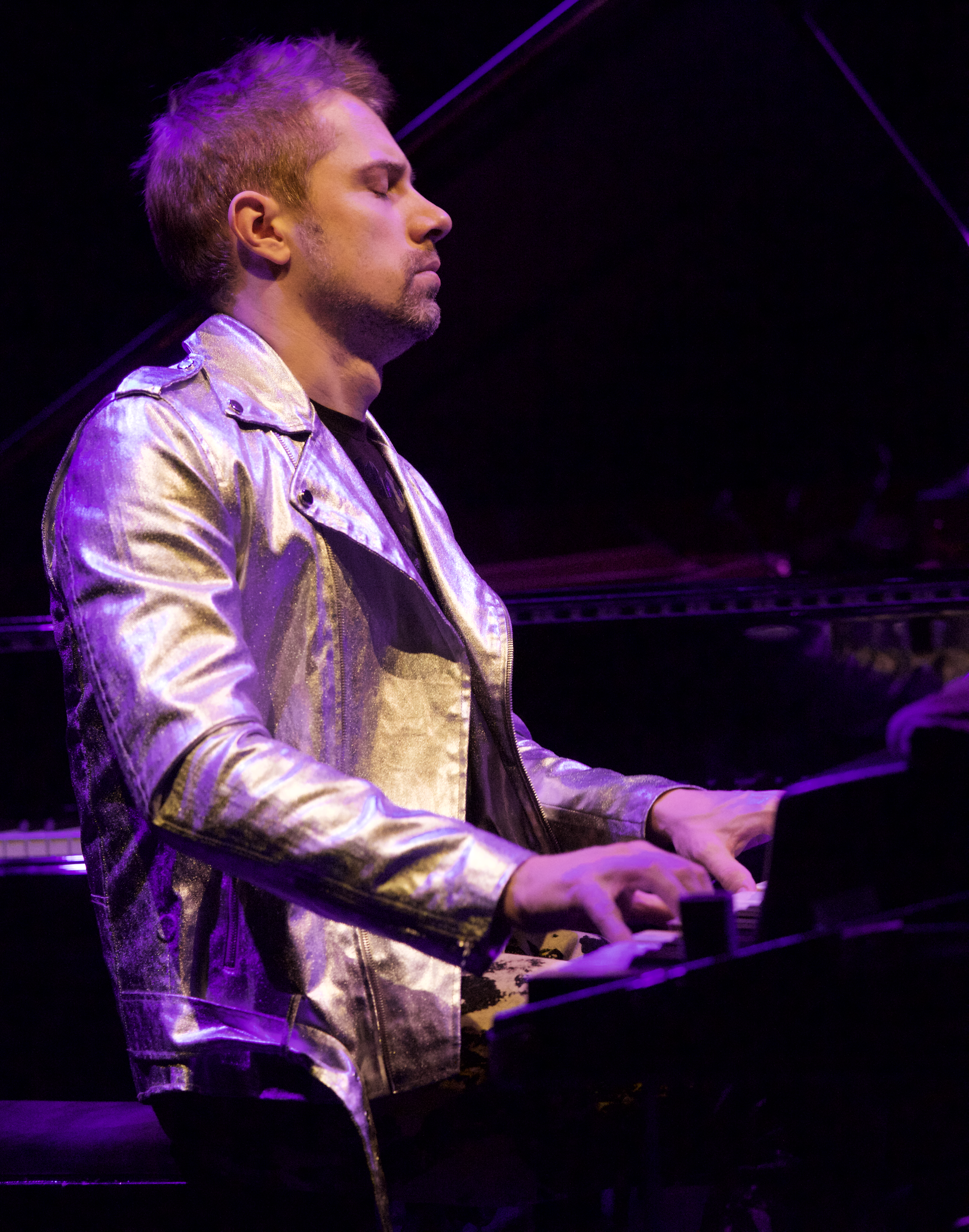

Background information
- Born: 18 August 1984 (age 42); Doncaster, England
- Genres: Jazz, electronic, avant-garde
- Occupation: Musician
- Instruments: Piano, keyboards
- Years active: 2000s–present
- Labels: Posi-Tone, Mythology, Criss Cross, Whirlwind, Sunnyside, BRM
- Website: www.johnescreet.com

John Escreet (born 18 August 1984) is an English pianist, composer and improviser. He has lived in the United States since 2006 and currently resides in Los Angeles, California.

== Biography ==
Escreet moved to New York in 2006. In 2008 he graduated from the Master’s Program at Manhattan School of Music, where he studied piano with Kenny Barron and Jason Moran.

In September 2008 he released his debut album Consequences featuring David Binney (alto saxophone), Ambrose Akinmusire (trumpet), Matt Brewer (double bass) and Tyshawn Sorey (drums). Escreet has since released several highly-acclaimed albums of original music (see leader discography below) featuring a diverse array of musicians including Chris Potter, Wayne Krantz, Marcus Gilmore, Nasheet Waits, Jim Black, Evan Parker, Nicholas Payton, Greg Osby, Eric Harland, Justin Brown, Eric Revis and Damion Reid.

From 2011-2021 John worked regularly as a sideman with the Grammy Award-winning drummer Antonio Sanchez in his band "Migration", recording 3 albums - New Life (2012), The Meridian Suite (2015), Lines In The Sand (2019) - as well as touring the world several times over. During this time he also worked regularly as a sideman with Tyshawn Sorey, David Binney, Amir ElSaffar, Alex Sipiagin as well as many others.

In 2020 John relocated to Los Angeles. He formed a new piano trio there during the COVID-19 lockdowns with bassist Eric Revis and drummer Damion Reid. They recorded the album Seismic Shift which was released in 2022. It was instantly well-received, with Downbeat Magazine proclaiming “The agility and interplay between the three, on what is Escreet’s first-ever trio recording, makes the entirety of Seismic Shift a joyful, “hell, yeah” listen.” The Wall Street Journal declared that “Together, the three have achieved a remarkable rapport, moving as a unit through pieces with sudden tempo changes and dynamics that range from all out sonic assault to pristine delicacy.” All Music described it as "a gorgeously arresting album, and there's never a moment where you can easily predict where Escreet's trio is going to go next."

In 2023 John collaborated with the celebrated British electronic artist Floating Points, performing his landmark work Promises to a capacity crowd at The Hollywood Bowl.

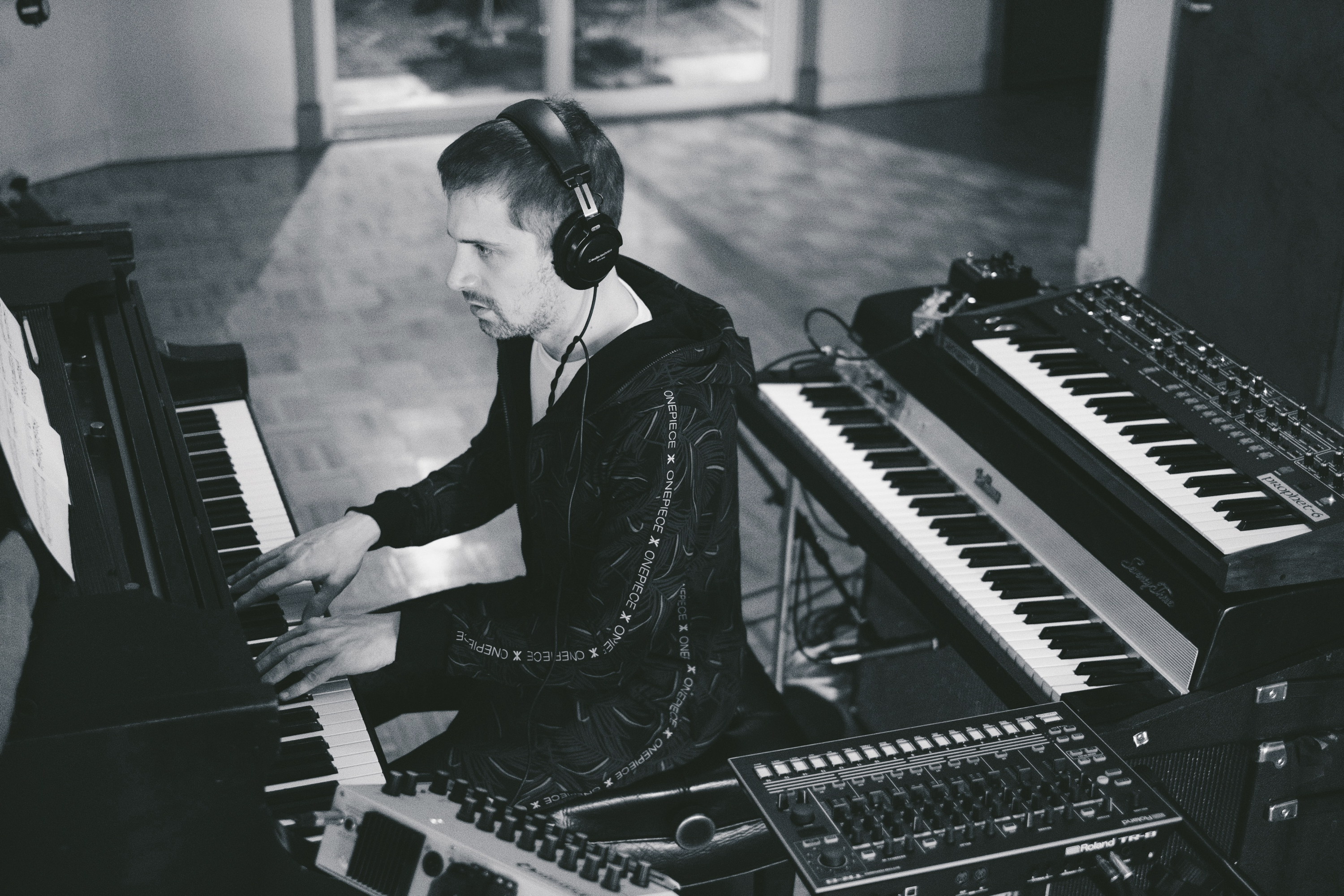
John Escreet in the studio in 2018

== Grants and Commissions ==
Escreet is widely celebrated as a highly original composer, and has received numerous composition grants and commissions over the years.

In 2021, he was a recipient of the highly-coveted South Arts Jazz Road Creative Residencies Grant worth $40,000. Previous awards include the Chamber Music America New Jazz Works Grant in 2009, as well as the CMA/ASCAP Award for Adventurous Programming in 2011. In 2013, Escreet was commissioned by the Jazz Gallery to write a new work as part of their Residency/Commissions for 2012-2013, for which he wrote an extended work for string quartet and piano trio. 2014 saw John being awarded the Mid Atlantic Arts Foundation USArtists International grant, enabling his Trio from the United States to collaborate on a European tour with the esteemed British free-jazz saxophonist Evan Parker.

== Teaching and Education ==
During his time in New York John was on faculty at The New School. He currently teaches at the Herbie Hancock Institute of Jazz and California State University, Northridge in Los Angeles.

== Discography ==
=== As leader ===
Year	Artist	Title	Label
2008	John Escreet	Consequences	Posi-Tone
2010	John Escreet	Don't Fight the Inevitable	Mythology
2011	John Escreet	The Age We Live In	Mythology
2011	John Escreet	Exception to the Rule	Criss Cross
2013	John Escreet	Sabotage and Celebration	Whirlwind
2014	John Escreet	Sound, Space and Structures	Sunnyside
2016	John Escreet	The Unknown	Sunnyside
2018	John Escreet	Learn To Live	Blue Room Music
2022	John Escreet	Seismic Shift	Whirlwind
2024	John Escreet	the epicenter of your dreams	Blue Room Music

=== As sideman ===
Year	Artist	Title	Label
2009	David Binney & Alan Ferber	In the Paint	Posi-Tone
2010	David Binney	Aliso	Criss Cross
2011	Knower	Think Thoughts	Self-released
2011	Tyshawn Sorey	Oblique	Pi
2012	Jamie Baum	In This Life	Sunnyside
2012	Antonio Sanchez	New Life	CAM Jazz
2013	Amir ElSaffar	Alchemy	Pi
2014	David Binney	Anacapa	Criss Cross
2015	Alex Sipiagin	Balance 38–58	Criss Cross
2015	Antonio Sanchez	The Meridian Suite	CAM Jazz
2017	Alex Sipiagin	Moments Captured	Criss Cross
2017	Alex Sipiagin	Relativity	SkyDeck Music
2018	Antonio Sanchez	Lines In The Sand	CAM Jazz
2019	Alex Sipiagin	NoFo Skies	Blue Room Music
2021	Amir ElSaffar	The Other Shore	Out Note Records
2022	John Escreet/Pera Krstajic/Anthony Fung	Cresta	Self-released
2022	Dan Rosenboom	Polarity	Orenda Records
2023	Logan Kane	Floor Plans	Ghost Note Records
