= Marek Napiórkowski =

Polish jazz guitarist and composer (born 1969)

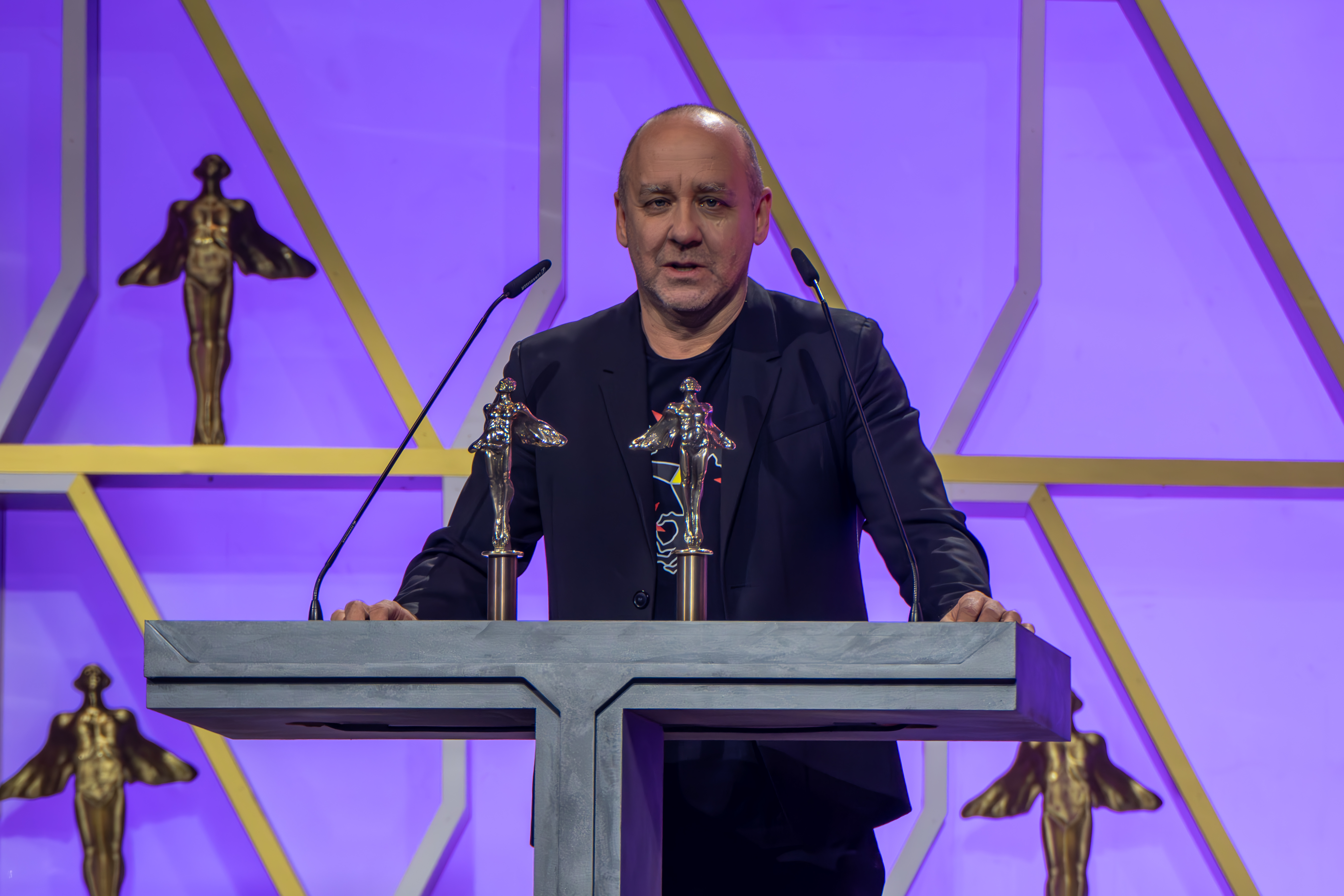

Background information
- Born: 27 October 1969 (age 55); Jelenia Góra, Poland
- Genres: Jazz, jazz fusion
- Occupation: Musician
- Instrument: Guitar
- Labels: Universal Music Poland, V-Records
- Website: www.mareknapiorkowski.com

Marek Napiórkowski (born 27 October 1969 in Jelenia Góra) is a Polish jazz guitarist and composer.

== Music career ==
He has worked with Pat Metheny, Richard Bona, Mino Cinelu, Marcus Miller, Angelique Kidjo, John Taylor, Dhafer Youssef, Gregoire Maret, Adam Holzman, Sugar Blue, Ivan Lins, Clarence Penn, Anna Maria Jopek, Tomasz Stańko, Leszek Możdżer, Hadrien Feraud, Dorota Miśkiewicz, Henryk Miśkiewicz, Urszula Dudziak, Ewa Bem, Klaus Doldinger (Passport), Janusz Muniak, Tomasz Szukalski, Krzysztof Ścierański, and Jan "Ptaszyn" Wróblewski.

He has appeared on over 140 albums and toured around Europe, Canada, U.S., Japan, Brasil, Mexico, Indonesia, China, Korea, and Russia.

In 2002 he participated in Pat Metheny & Anna Maria Jopek’s album called Upojenie (Nonesuch, 2008) and also took part in two concerts following the release of the album.

He has released four original albums. Three of them were nominated for the Polish music award Fryderyk in Jazz Album of the Year and Jazz Musician of the Year categories. 6 June 2005 was the year when NAP (Universal Music Poland) album was released featuring Leszek Możdżer, Anna Maria Jopek and Henryk Miśkiewicz.

On 1 July 2007 the acoustic album Wolno (Universal Music Poland) was released, in co-operation with Mino Cinelu, Gregoire Maret, Anna Maria Jopek. The album reached gold status in Poland.

Album firmed by Marek Napiórkowski Trio is called KonKubiNap (Universal Music Poland) and was recorded live with Robert Kubiszyn and Cezary Konrad.

UP! (V Records, 2013) was recorded with Clarence Penn, Adam Pierończyk, Krzysztof Herdzin, Henryk Miśkiewicz, Robert Kubiszyn and nine pieces symphonic musicians chamber band.

In 2015 an album Celuloid with his friend from Jelenia Góra, guitarist Artur Lesicki was released (V Records). On the album duo recorded notable Polish film and TV series main themes (including music by Wojciech Kilar, Krzysztof Komeda or Andrzej Kurylewicz).

The newest album Trójka Live (Polish Radio series "Live in Trójka, vol. 17") was released in 14 October 2016.

In a Jazz Top survey carried out among readers of Jazz Forum, Marek was chosen as the Jazz Guitarist of the Year 2012–2015.

== Solo albums ==
- 2005 NAP
- 2007 Wolno (Slowly/Freedom)
- 2011 KonKubiNap (as Marek Napiórkowski Trio)
- 2013 UP!
- 2015 Celuloid (with Artur Lesicki)
- 2016 Trójka Live (as Marek Napiórkowski Sextet)

== With groups ==
- 1997 - Funky Groove (Funky Groove)
- 2002 - Go to Chechua Mountain (Funky Groove)
- 2002 - Zatrzymaj się (Dorota Miśkiewicz Goes to Heaven)
- 2004 - Henryk Miśkiewicz Full Drive
- 2005 - Pod rzęsami (Dorota Miśkiewicz)
- 2006 - Live in Opole (Ścieranski-Napiórkowski-Jakubek-Dąbrówka)
- 2007 - Acoustic Room 47 (Various Artist)
- 2007 - Henryk Miśkiewicz Full Drive 2
- 2007 - Tak zwyczajny dzień (Karolina Kozak)
- 2008 - Caminho (Dorota Miśkiewicz)
- 2012 - ALE (Dorota Miśkiewicz)
- 2012 - Henryk Miśkiewicz Full Drive 3 feat. Michael 'Patches' Stewart

with Anna Maria Jopek

- 1998 - Szeptem (Mercury/Polygram Poland)
- 1999 - Dzisiaj z Betleyem (Universal Music Poland)
- 2000 - Bosa (Universal Music Poland)
- 2002 - Nienasycenie (Universal Music Poland); Barefoot (Emarcy); Upojenie with Pat Metheny (Warner Music Poland)
- 2003 - Farat (Universal Music Poland; CD, DVD, Box CD/DVD + CD "Z pamięci")
- 2005 - Secret (EmArcy); Niebo (Universal Music Poland)
- 2007 - ID (Universal Music Poland/Emarcy)
- 2008 - JO & CO (Universal Music Poland; Dwa serduszka cztery oczy (Universal Music Poland; box 2CD+CD "Spoza")
- 2011 - Polanna (Universal Music Poland); Lustra (Universal Music Poland, box 3CD)
