= Valentina Blú =

Italian musical artist

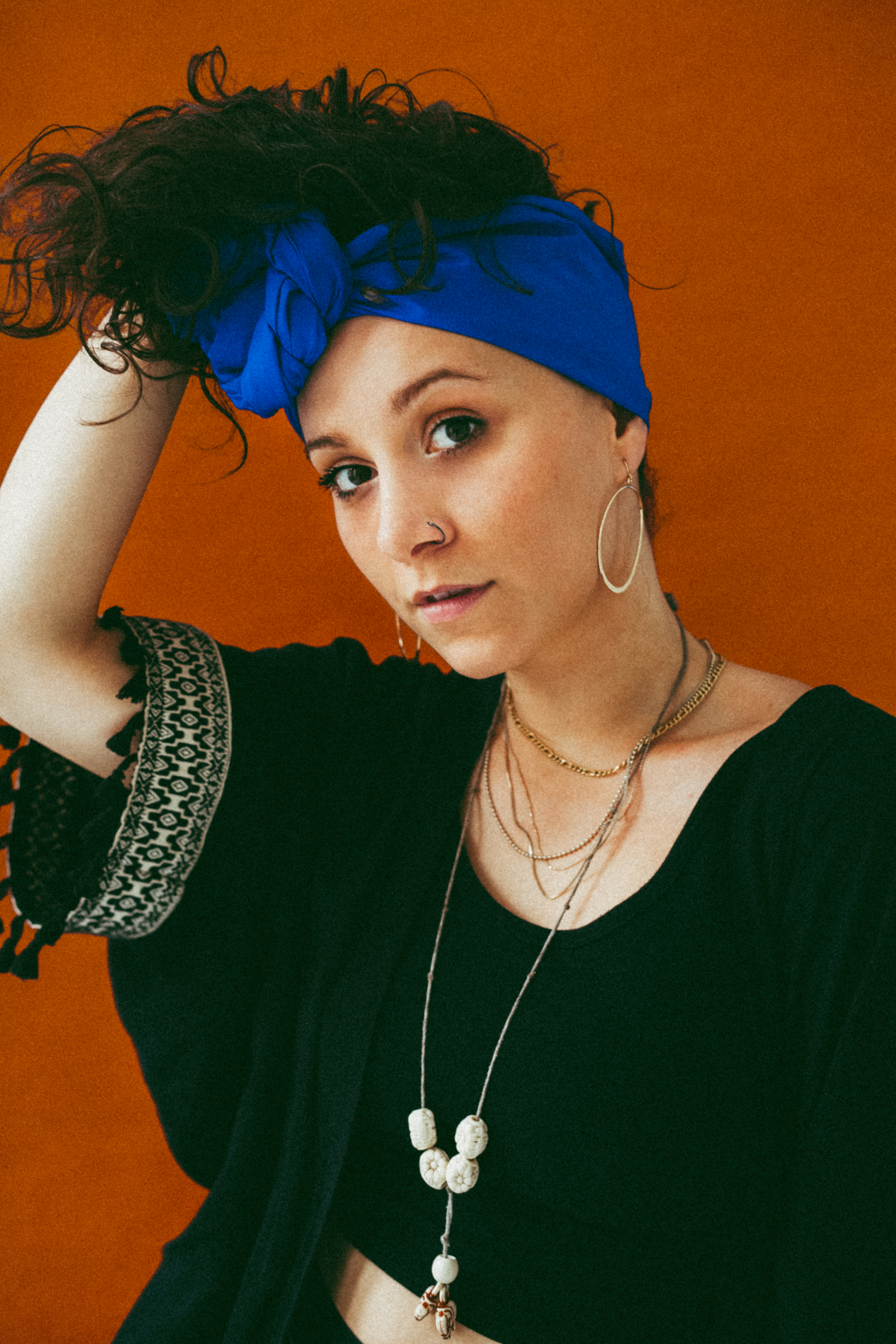

Background information
- Birth name: Valentina Lombardi
- Born: Pistoia, Italy
- Genres: World music, pop, alternative, electronic, experimental
- Occupation(s): Singer, songwriter, music producer
- Instrument(s): Vocals, piano, synthesizers
- Years active: 2015–present
- Website: valentinablu.com

Valentina Lombardi, known professionally as Valentina Blú, is an Italian singer, songwriter and music producer. Her song "Another Sky" won best World Beat song at the 15th edition of the Independent Music Awards (2016), and both the Grand Prize and Lennon Award at the John Lennon Songwriting Contest in the World Music category (2017).

== Biography ==
Lombardi was born in Pistoia, Italy. She started taking piano lessons at the age of 6 and continued studying music throughout her teenage years. Growing up she attended a public foreign languages school where she studied English, Spanish, French, and Latin and took part in exchange programs where she studied and lived in Avignon and Grenoble (France) as well as in Valencia (Spain).

In 2010, while attending the Umbria Jazz Clinics, she was awarded a scholarship to attend Berklee College of Music in Boston, Massachusetts. On completing her studies at Berklee, Lombardi relocated to New York City, where she started collaborating with Dominican music producer, sound designer, and fellow Berklee College of Music graduate Fernando A. Faneyte.

Her music mixes elements of contemporary pop and electronic music with traditional sounds and rhythms from the Mediterranean and Latin America. She has described her music as "melting pop"., alluding to the combination of different cultures and sonic influences that make up her style. Blú is also known for writing lyrics and singing in multiple languages, including English, Spanish, Italian, and French.

Among others, Valentina Blú's music is influenced by artists like Ibeyi, Bomba Estéreo, A-WA, Pino Daniele, Yasmine Hamdan, Emel Mathlouthi, Mayra Andrade, ÌFÉ, J Balvin, and Meshell Ndegeocello

She is featured on Grammy-nominated album 'ONA' by Thana Alexa, released in 2020.

== Discography ==
=== EPs ===
Title	Year	Notes
ACCENT	2018	Limited edition (physical print only)

=== Singles ===
Title	Year	EP
"Sono Io"	2020	–
"beneath my feet"	2018	ACCENT
"ACCENT"	2018	ACCENT
"blackhole"	2018	ACCENT
"higher&higher"	2018	ACCENT
"Another Sky"	2017	–
"Crescent Moon"	2015	–
"2000cal"	2015	–
