= Three Times Three =

Studio album by Antonio Sánchez
- Released: September 23, 2014
- Recorded: October – December 2013
- Studio: MSR, Sear Sound, New York City
- Genre: Jazz
- Length: 1:24:29
- Label: CAM Jazz
- Producer: Antonio Sánchez, Ermanno Basso

Antonio Sánchez chronology
Birdman (2014)	Three Times Three (2014)	The Meridian Suite (2015)

Three Times Three is a studio album by jazz drummer Antonio Sánchez. The record was released on September 23, 2014 via CAM Jazz label.

== Music and recording ==
The album was recorded in New York between October and December 2013. It teams Sánchez in three trio settings. One is with pianist Brad Mehldau and bassist Matt Brewer; another is with guitarist John Scofield and bassist Christian McBride; and the third is with tenor saxophonist Joe Lovano and bassist John Patitucci.

== Reception ==
The album was released as a two-CD set on September 23, 2014, by CAM Jazz. The Financial Times' reviewer wrote that "Sanchez, in cracking form, brings out the best of his all-star cast with crisp rolls, light-touch cymbals and crashing interjections. Great tunes, strong moods and lots going on."

Professional ratings
Review scores
Source	Rating
Financial Times	4/5 stars
PopMatters	7/10 stars

== Track listing ==
1. "Nar-this"
2. "Constellations"
3. "Big Dream"
4. "Fall"
5. "Nook and Crannies"
6. "Rooney and Vinski"
7. "Leviathan"
8. "Firenze"
9. "I Mean You"

== Personnel ==
- Antonio Sánchez – drums
- Matt Brewer – bass
- Joe Lovano – tenor saxophone
- Christian McBride – bass
- Brad Mehldau – piano
- John Patitucci – bass
- John Scofield – guitar
