= Migration (Antonio Sánchez album) =

Studio album by Antonio Sánchez
- Released: August 28, 2007
- Recorded: January 10, 11 and 21, 2007
- Studio: Sear Sound, New York City: Mad Hatter East, Clearwater, Florida
- Genre: Jazz
- Length: 76:19
- Label: CAM Jazz CAMJ 7804-2
- Producer: Ermanno Basso

Antonio Sánchez chronology
Migration (2007)	Live in New York at Jazz Standard (2010)

Migration is the debut studio album by drummer Antonio Sánchez which was released on the CAM Jazz label in 2007.

== Reception ==
Professional ratings
Review scores
Source	Rating
Allmusic	4/5 stars
All About Jazz	4/5 stars

The Allmusic review stated, "Drummer Antonio Sanchéz's debut recording as a leader is an impressive outing". All About Jazz observed: "Antonio Sanchez's debut, Migration, deftly evokes the life of the desert as an allegory for the journey within all of us".

== Track listing ==
All compositions by Antonio Sánchez except where noted.

1. "One for Antonio" (Chick Corea) – 9:03
2. "Did You Get It?" – 7:26
3. "Arena (Sand)" (Pat Metheny) – 9:32
4. "Challenge Within" – 8:47
5. "Ballade" – 6:31
6. "Greedy Silence" – 10:55
7. "Inner Urge" (Joe Henderson) – 9:29
8. "Solar" (Miles Davis) – 4:36

== Personnel ==
- Antonio Sánchez – drums
- Chris Potter – soprano saxophone, tenor saxophone
- David Sánchez – tenor saxophone
- Scott Colley – double bass
- Chick Corea – piano (track 1)
- Pat Metheny – guitar (tracks 3 & 8)
