= Tokyo Day Trip =

EP by Pat Metheny
- Released: May 20, 2008
- Recorded: December 2004
- Venue: Blue Note Tokyo, Japan
- Genre: Jazz
- Length: 40:32
- Label: Nonesuch
- Producer: Pat Metheny, Steve Rodby

Pat Metheny chronology
Day Trip (2008)	Tokyo Day Trip (2008)	Upojenie (2008)

Professional ratings
Review scores
Source	Rating
AllMusic	3.5/5 stars
All About Jazz	

Tokyo Day Trip is a live EP by Pat Metheny with bassist Christian McBride and drummer Antonio Sanchez released on May 20, 2008. The album was recorded live at Blue Note Tokyo in Tokyo, Japan.

== Track listing ==
All music is composed by Pat Metheny.

No.	Title	Length
1.	"Tromsø"	9:45
2.	"Traveling Fast"	11:45
3.	"Inori"	6:04
4.	"Back Arm & Blackcharge"	6:34
5.	"The Night Becomes You"	6:17
Total length:		40:32

== Personnel ==
- Pat Metheny – guitar, electric sitar, baritone and acoustic guitars
- Christian McBride – double bass
- Antonio Sánchez – drums, orchestra bells

=== Technical personnel ===
- Pat Metheny – producer
- Steve Rodby – co-producer
- David Oakes – recording
- Pete Karam – mixing
- Carolyn Chrzan – assister
- David Sholemson – project coordinator
- Jerry Wortman – tour manager
- Josh George – cover painting
