= Ben Williams (musician) =

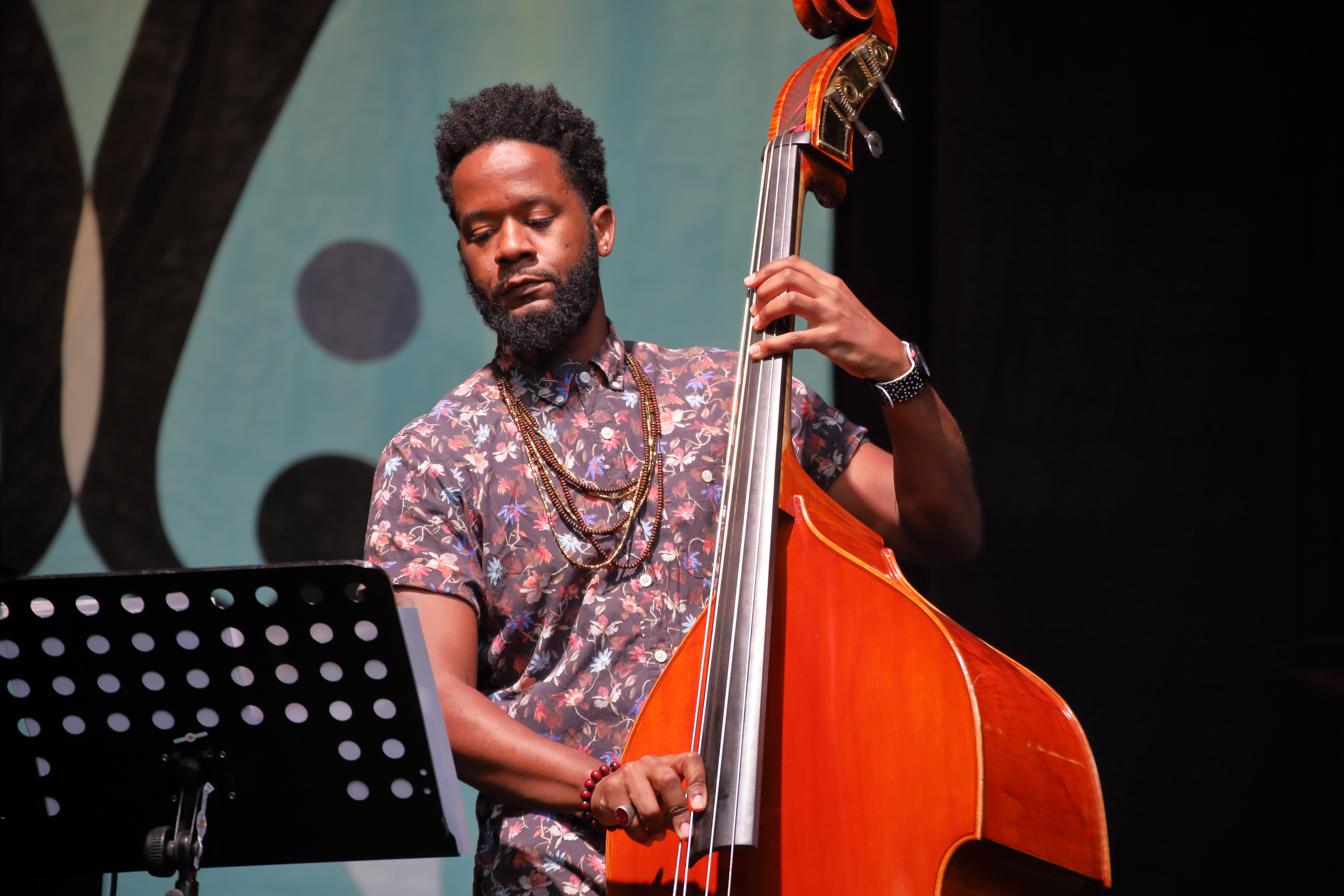

Background information
- Born: December 28, 1984; Washington, D.C., U.S.
- Genres: Jazz
- Occupation: Musician
- Instrument: Bass
- Years active: 2000s–present
- Labels: Concord, Rainbow Blonde Records,
- Website: www.benwilliamsmusic.net

Ben Williams (born December 28, 1984, Washington, D.C.) is an American jazz bassist.

== Biography ==
Ben Williams began playing bass at age 10, was raised in the District of Columbia, and graduated from Duke Ellington School of the Arts. He received a Bachelor of Arts in Music Education from Michigan State University and a Master of Music in Jazz Studies at the Juilliard School.

In 2009, he won the prestigious Thelonious Monk International Jazz Bass Competition as judged by Ron Carter, Charlie Haden, Dave Holland, Robert Hurst, Christian McBride, and John Patitucci. The honor included a recording contract with Concord Records through which he released his debut album, State of Art, in 2011, featuring saxophonist Marcus Strickland, guitarist Matthew Stevens, pianist Gerald Clayton, drummer Jamire Williams, and percussionist Etienne Charles. His album Coming of Age, was released in April 2015 featuring sidemen Marcus Strickland on tenor and soprano saxophones, Matthew Stevens on electric guitar, Christian Sands on piano, and John Davis on drums.

In August 2020, Williams contributed to the live streamed recording of the singer Bilal's EP VOYAGE-19, created remotely during the COVID-19 lockdowns. It was released the following month, with proceeds from its sales going to participating musicians in financial hardship from the pandemic.

== Awards and honors ==
Williams was a member of guitarist Pat Metheny's Unity Band, which won Grammy Award for Best Jazz Instrumental Album for Unity Band in the 2013 Grammy.

Williams was introduced as one of the “25 for the Future” by DownBeat magazine in 2016.

== Discography ==
=== As leader ===
Year recorded	Title	Label	Personnel/Notes
2011	State of Art	Concord	Quintet, with Marcus Strickland (saxophone), Matthew Stevens (guitar), Gerald Clayton (piano), Etienne Charles (percussion), and Jamire Williams (drums)
2015	Coming of Age	Concord	Quintet, with Marcus Strickland (tenor and soprano saxophones), Matthew Stevens (electric guitar), Christian Sands (piano), and John Davis (drums)
2020	I Am A Man	Rainbow Blonde Records	Various artists, with Ben Williams (voice and bass), Kris Bowers (piano, keyboards), David Rosenthal (guitar), Jamire Williams (drums), Justin Brown (drums), Bendji Allonce (percussion), and special guests

=== As sideman ===
Year recorded	Leader	Title	Label
2009	Stefon Harris	Urbanus	Concord
2010	Jacky Terrasson	Push	Concord
2012	Pat Metheny	Unity Band	Nonesuch
2014	Pat Metheny	Kin	Nonesuch
2016	Pat Metheny	The Unity Sessions	Nonesuch
2017	Steve Wilson	Sit Back, Relax & Unwind	J.M.I. Recordings
