= Giulio Carmassi =

Italian multi-instrumentalist

- Born: Giuliano Giulio Giacomo Carmassi; February 21, 1981; Lucca, Italy
- Genres: Jazz, rock, pop, classical
- Occupations: Singer, musician, composer, producer, arranger
- Instrument: Multi-instrumentalist
- Website: www.giuliocarmassi.com

Giuliano Giulio Giacomo Carmassi (born February 21, 1981, in Lucca, Italy) is an Italian multi-instrumentalist.

== Music career ==
Carmassi has performed many different jobs in music: multi-instrumentalist, singer, film composer, arranger, producer, and engineer. He has recorded on the following instruments: bass guitar, bells, cello, clarinet, cornet, drums, flugelhorn, flute, French horn, glockenspiel, guitar (electric), horn, keyboards, melodica, organ, piano, recorder, saxophone (alto), synthesizer, trombone, trumpet, vibraphone, vocals, whistling, and the Wurlitzer organ.

Carmassi has been a member of the Pat Metheny Unity Group and has appeared on the albums Kin (←→) (Nonesuch, 2014) and The Unity Sessions (Nonesuch, 2016). Kin won album of the year in the annual readers' poll in Down Beat magazine.

Carmassi has worked with Anne Drummond, Bryan Scary, Francois Moutin, Keith Carlock, Lew Soloff, Mark Egan, Oli Rockberger, Oz Noy, Steve Gadd, and Tim Lefebvre.

He arranged and played piano on Emmy Rossum's album, Sentimental Journey. He worked with British singer Ginger on the album Hey Hello, which reached No. 1 on the rock music charts in the UK.

He played trumpet on Chuck Loeb's album, Silhouette, and Keiko Matsui's album, Soul Quest. He worked as an arranger and multi-instrumentalist on Will Lee's album, Love, Gratitude and Other Distractions.

Carmassi composed the score for the movies Somewhere Tonight starring John Turturro and Adventures of Serial Buddies starring Christopher Lloyd and Maria Menounos. Carmassi and Bryan Scary composed and performed the score for the 2022 film Please Baby Please starring Andrea Riseborough and Harry Melling.

== Discography ==
- Old and New (2006)
- The Train with the Green Curtain (2008)
- Enter to Exit (2014)
- The Innocent (2016)
- A Dream of the House by the Cliff (2020)

With Pat Metheny

- KIN (←→) (Nonesuch, 2014)
- The Unity Sessions (Nonesuch, 2016)

With others

- Marco Morandi, Marco Morandi (2006)
- Beneath a Balcony, Marc M. Cogman (Time-Act, 2009)
- B is for Baroness, Molly White (2009)
- Decide, Walin (Bitemark, 2009)
- Anthems, Marc M. Cogman (Last 3 Punks, 2011)
- Dreams, Visible from Space (CD Baby, 2012)
- Silhouette, Chuck Loeb (Shanachie, 2013)
- Sentimental Journey, Emmy Rossum (Warner Bros., 2013)
- Soul Quest, Keiko Matsui (Shanachie, 2013)
- Hey! Hello!, Hey! Hello! (2013)
- I Meant It to Be Sweet, Tommy Wallach (Rude Fox, 2014)
- Twisted Blues, Vol. 2, Oz Noy (Abstract Logix, 2014)
- Dead Measengers, Marc M. Cogman (Last 3 Punks, 2020)
