= Sabotage and Celebration =

Studio album by John Escreet
- Released: 15 October 2013
- Genre: Jazz
- Label: Whirlwind Recordings
- Producer: John Escreet

Sabotage and Celebration is an album by British-born, Brooklyn-based pianist and keyboardist John Escreet. It was released on 15 October 2013 on Whirlwind Recordings.

== Track listing ==
1. Axis of Hope
2. He Who Dares
3. Sabotage and Celebration
4. The Decapitator
5. Laura Angela
6. Animal Style
7. Beyond Your Wildest Dreams

== Credits ==
- John Escreet – piano, Fender Rhodes
- David Binney – alto/sop. saxophones
- Chris Potter – tenor saxophone
- Matt Brewer – double bass
- Jim Black – drums
- Adam Rogers – guitar (tracks 5 & 7)
- Louis Cole and Genevieve Artadi, Nina Geiger – vocals (track 7)
- Fung Chern Hwei – violin
- Annette Homann – violin
- Hannah Levinson – viola
- Mariel Roberts – cello
- Garth Stevenson – double bass
- Shane Endsley – trumpet
- Josh Roseman – trombone
- All tracks composed, arranged & produced by John Escreet
- Engineer, mixing & mastering by Tyler McDiarmid
- Executive producer – Michael Janisch
