= David Sánchez (musician) =

Puerto Rican jazz saxophonist

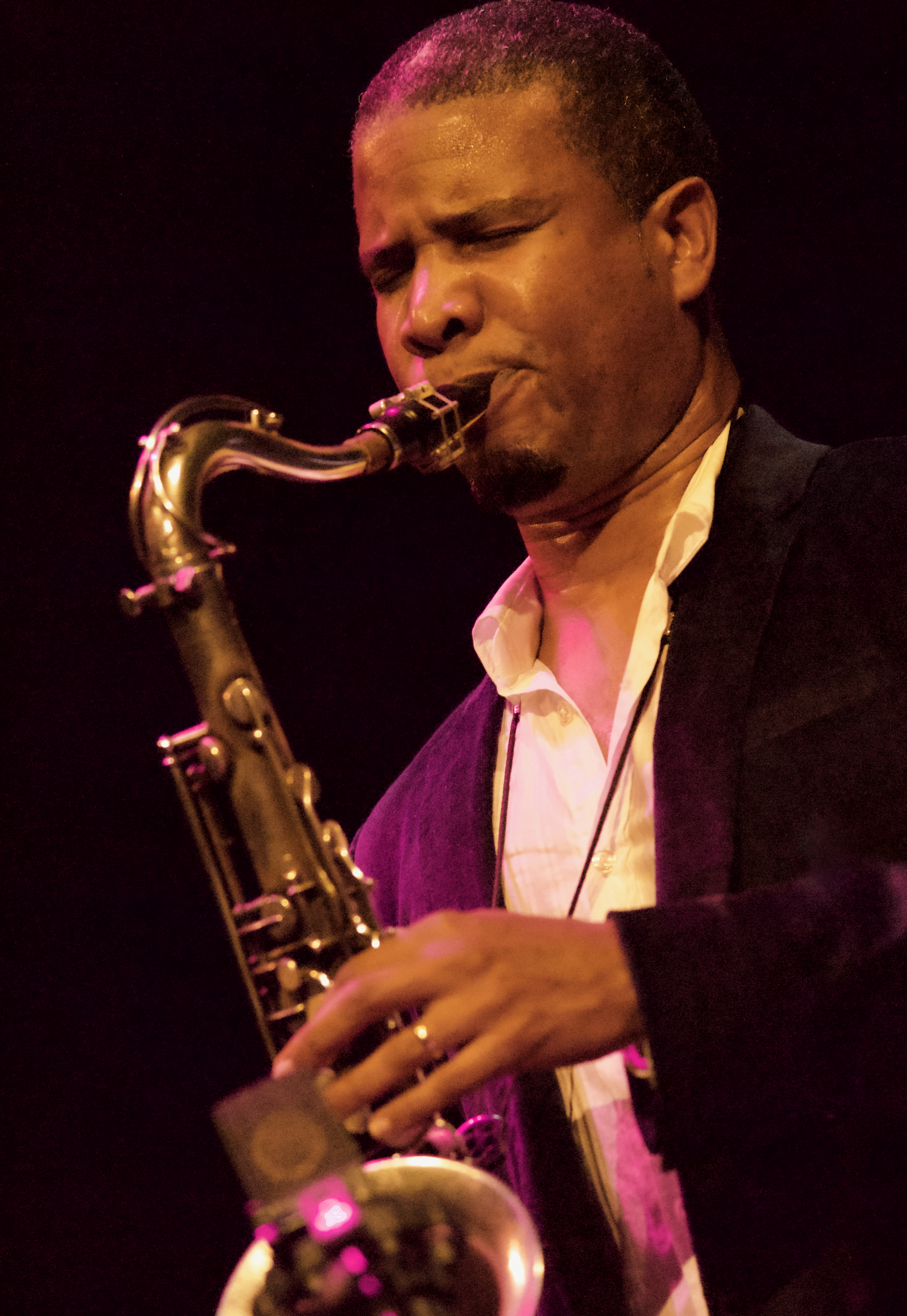
- Sánchez in 2014

Background information
- Born: September 3, 1968 (age 58); Guaynabo, Puerto Rico
- Genre: Jazz
- Occupation: Musician
- Instrument: Tenor saxophone
- Years active: Early-1990s–present
- Labels: Columbia; Concord; Ropeadope
- Website: www.davidsanchezmusic.com

David Sánchez (born 3 September 1968) is a Grammy Award-winning jazz tenor saxophonist from Puerto Rico.

== Early life ==
Sánchez was born in Guaynabo, Puerto Rico. He took up the conga when he was age eight and started playing tenor saxophone at age 12. His earliest influences were Afro-Caribbean and danza styles but also European and Latin classical. At the age of 12, Sanchez attended La Escuela Libre de Musica, which emphasized formal musical studies and classical European styles.

== Discography ==
=== As leader ===
- The Departure (Columbia, 1994)
- Sketches of Dreams (Columbia, 1995)
- Street Scenes (Columbia, 1996)
- Obsesion (Columbia, 1998)
- Melaza (Columbia, 2000)
- Travesia (Columbia, 2001)
- Coral (Columbia, 2004)
- Cultural Survival (Concord Picante, 2008)
- Carib (Ropeadope, 2019)

=== As sideman ===
- Claudia Acuna, Wind from the South (Verve, 2000)
- Ray Barretto, Standards Rican-ditioned (Zoho, 2006)
- Kenny Barron, Spirit Song (Verve, 2000)
- Ignacio Berroa, Codes (Blue Note, 2006)
- Jimmy Bosch, Salsa Dura (Ryko, 1999)
- Randy Brecker, Randy Pop! (Piloo, 2015)
- Duduka Da Fonseca, Samba Jazz Fantasia (Art Music, 2002)
- Santi Debriano, Panamaniacs (Free Lance, 1994)
- Barbara Dennerlein, Junkanoo (Verve, 1997)
- Kenny Drew Jr., A Look Inside (Antilles, 1993)
- Kyle Eastwood, From There to Here (Columbia, 1998)
- Dizzy Gillespie, To Bird with Love (Telarc, 1992)
- Dizzy Gillespie, Bird Songs: The Final Recordings (Telarc, 1997)
- Edsel Gomez, Cubist Music (Zoho, 2006)
- Charlie Haden, Nocturne (Verve, 2001)
- Slide Hampton, Dedicated to Diz (Telarc, 1993)
- Kip Hanrahan, Exotica (American Clave, 1992)
- Roy Hargrove, Habana (Verve, 1997)
- Tom Harrell, The Art of Rhythm (RCA Victor, 1998)
- Stefon Harris, Ninety Miles (Concord Picante, 2011)
- Roy Haynes, Praise (Dreyfus, 1998)
- Roy Haynes, A Life in Time (Dreyfus, 2007)
- Giovanni Hidalgo, Villa Hidalgo (Messidor, 1992)
- La India, Llego la India Via Eddie Palmieri (Acid Jazz, 1992)
- Jonny King, The Meltdown (Enja, 1997)
- Ryan Kisor, On the One (Columbia, 1993)
- Mike Longo, I Miss You John (Consolidated Artists, 1995)
- Harold Lopez-Nussa, El Pais De Las Maravillas (World Village, 2011)
- Jason Miles, Miles to Miles (Narada, 2005)
- Mingus Big Band, Que Viva Mingus! (Dreyfus, 1997)
- Michael Philip Mossman, Springdance (Claves, 1995)
- Andy Narell, Tatoom (Heads Up, 2006)
- Nuyorican Soul, Nuyorican Soul (Talkin' Loud/Giant Step, 1997)
- Eddie Palmieri, Listen Here! (Concord Picante, 2005)
- Leon Parker, Above & Below (Epicure, 1994)
- Daniel Ponce, Chango Te Llama (Mango, 1991)
- Rachel Z, Trust the Universe (Columbia, 1993)
- Tony Reedus, People Get Ready (Sweet Basil, 1998)
- Claudio Roditi, Jazz Turns Samba (Groovin' High, 1994)
- Roberto Roena, Regreso (UP, 1987)
- Hilton Ruiz, Manhattan Mambo (Telarc, 1992)
- Hilton Ruiz, Heroes (Telarc, 1994)
- Hilton Ruiz, Hands On Percussion (RMM, 1995)
- Dave Samuels, Tjaderized (Verve, 1998)
- Antonio Sánchez, Migration (CAM Jazz, 2007)
- Antonio Sanchez, Live in New York at Jazz Standard (CAM Jazz, 2010)
- Arturo Sandoval, I Remember Clifford (GRP, 1992)
- Lalo Schifrin, Latin Jazz Suite (Aleph, 1999)
- Lalo Schifrin, Intersections (Aleph, 2001)
- SFJAZZ Collective, Live: SFJAZZ Center 2013 (SFJAZZ, 2013)
- SFJAZZ Collective, 10th Anniversary (SFJAZZ, 2014)
- SFJAZZ Collective, Music of Miles Davis & Original Compositions (SFJAZZ, 2017)
- Steve Turre, TNT (Telarc, 2001)
- Dave Valentin, Tropic Heat (GRP, 1994)
- Gabriel Vicéns, Days (Inner Circle Music, 2015)
- Kenny Werner, Democracy Live at the Blue Note (Half Note, 2006)
- Kenny Werner, Balloons (Half Note, 2011)
- Miguel Zenon, Looking Forward (Fresh Sound, 2001)
