= The Unity Sessions =

Live album by Pat Metheny
- Released: May 6, 2016
- Recorded: December 2014
- Venue: Black Box Theatre, New York City
- Genre: Jazz
- Length: 116:03
- Label: Nonesuch
- Producer: Pat Metheny, Steve Rodby

Pat Metheny chronology
KIN (←→) (2014)	The Unity Sessions (2016)	Cuong Vu Trio Meets Pat Metheny (2016)

The Unity Sessions is an album by American jazz guitarist Pat Metheny and his Unity Band: saxophonist Chris Potter, bassist Ben Williams, keyboardist Giulio Carmassi and drummer Antonio Sánchez. A live album in a studio setting, it was recorded with a camera crew in a black box theatre without an audience. The recording was released on DVD and Blu-ray disc in 2015, then as a double CD in 2016.

== Reception ==
Professional ratings
Review scores
Source	Rating
Allmusic	3.5/5 stars
The Observer	4/5 stars
The Guardian	4/5 stars
Tom Hull	B

The album received generally favourable reviews with Metacritic giving it a score of 80% from 4 reviews. The AllMusic review by Matt Collar states "Ultimately, while Metheny is the undisputed leader here, it's the thoughtful interplay of all the Unity Group's members that makes these sessions so involving". In The Observer Dave Gelly wrote, "This double album, recorded at the end of a year-long tour by his Unity Band, is as polished and sophisticated as any, but moments such as the opening melody of "This Belongs to You" or the gradual unfolding of "Born" are just plain elegant". Writing for The Guardian, John Fordham observed, "there's a generally exhilarating sense of freedom here, notably in improv exchanges between the players and with Metheny's one-man-band Orchestrion machine, that testifies to how attuned constant gigging has made them".

== Track listing ==
All tracks are written by Pat Metheny except where noted.

Disc one:
No.	Title	Writer(s)	Length
1.	"Adagia"		2:09
2.	"Sign of the Season"		10:43
3.	"This Belongs to You"		5:40
4.	"Roofdogs"		7:50
5.	"Cherokee"	Ray Noble	5:02
6.	"Genealogy"		2:05
7.	"On Day One"		15:18
8.	"Medley"		10:53

Disc two:
No.	Title	Writer(s)	Length
1.	"Come and See"		12:55
2.	"Police People"	Ornette Coleman, Pat Metheny	2:53
3.	"Two Folk Songs (1)"		4:59
4.	"Born"		7:52
5.	"Kin"		11:07
6.	"Rise Up"		12:29
7.	"Go Get It"		4:19

Video:
No.	Title	Writer(s)	Length
1.	"Genealogy"		2:05
2.	"On Day One"		15:18
3.	"This Belongs To You"		5:40
4.	"Roofdogs"		7:50
5.	"Come And See"		12:55
6.	"Kin"		11:07
7.	"Born"		7:05
8.	"Rise Up"		12:29
9.	"Adagia"		2:09
10.	"Sign Of The Season"		10:43
11.	"(Go) Get It"		4:19
12.	"Cherokee"	Ray Noble	5:02
13.	"Police People"	Ornette Coleman, Pat Metheny	2:53
14.	"Two Folk Songs - 1st"		4:59
15.	"Medley"		10:53

== Personnel ==
- Pat Metheny – acoustic and electric guitars, guitar synthesizer, electronics, orchestrionics
- Chris Potter – tenor and soprano saxophones, bass clarinet, flute, guitar
- Antonio Sánchez – drums, cajón
- Ben Williams – acoustic and electric bass
- Giulio Carmassi – piano, synthesizer, flugelhorn, whistling, vocals

=== Technical personnel ===
- Pat Metheny – producer
- Steve Rodby – co-producer
- Pete Karam, David Oakes – recording
- Pete Karam – mixing
- Ted Jensen – mastering
