= Carib (album) =

Studio album by David Sánchez
- Released: June 7, 2019
- Label: Ropeadope

Carib is an album by David Sánchez, released by the record label Ropeadope on June 7, 2019. It received a 2020 Grammy Award nomination for Best Latin Jazz Album.
