= Day Trip (album) =

Studio album by Pat Metheny
- Released: January 29, 2008
- Recorded: October 19, 2005
- Studio: Right Track, New York City
- Genre: Jazz
- Length: 68:08
- Label: Nonesuch
- Producer: Pat Metheny

Pat Metheny chronology
| Metheny/Mehldau Quartet (2007) | Day Trip (2008) | Tokyo Day Trip (2008) |

Professional ratings
Review scores
| Source | Rating |
|---|---|
| Jazzwise | 3/5 stars |
| The Penguin Guide to Jazz Recordings | 3/4 stars |
| Tom Hull | B+ |

Day Trip is a studio album by jazz guitarist Pat Metheny with bassist Christian McBride and drummer Antonio Sanchez. It was released by Nonesuch Records on January 29, 2008.

== Background ==
The album has also been released in versions that include one bonus track ("Whatnot") and in a reissue package combined with Tokyo Day Trip.

== Track listing ==
All music is composed by Pat Metheny.

| No. | Title | Length |
|---|---|---|
| 1. | "Son of Thirteen" | 5:49 |
| 2. | "At Last You're Here" | 7:59 |
| 3. | "Let's Move" | 5:22 |
| 4. | "Snova" | 5:56 |
| 5. | "Calvin's Keys" | 7:25 |
| 6. | "Is This America? (Katrina 2005)" | 4:34 |
| 7. | "When We Were Free" | 9:00 |
| 8. | "Dreaming Trees" | 7:46 |
| 9. | "The Red One" | 4:47 |
| 10. | "Day Trip" | 9:03 |
| Total length: | | 68:08 |

== Personnel ==
- Pat Metheny – acoustic and electric guitar, guitar synthesizer
- Christian McBride – double bass
- Antonio Sánchez – drums

=== Technical personnel ===
- Pat Metheny – producer
- David Sholemson – coordinator producer
- Pete Karam – recording
- Joe Ferla – mixing
- Mark Wilder – mastering at Sony Music Studios, NYC, USA
- Barbara de Wilde – design
- Josh George – cover painting

== Charts ==
| Year | Chart | Position |
|---|---|---|
| 2008 | Billboard Top Contemporary Jazz | 1 |
