= Francesco Cafiso =

Italian jazz musician

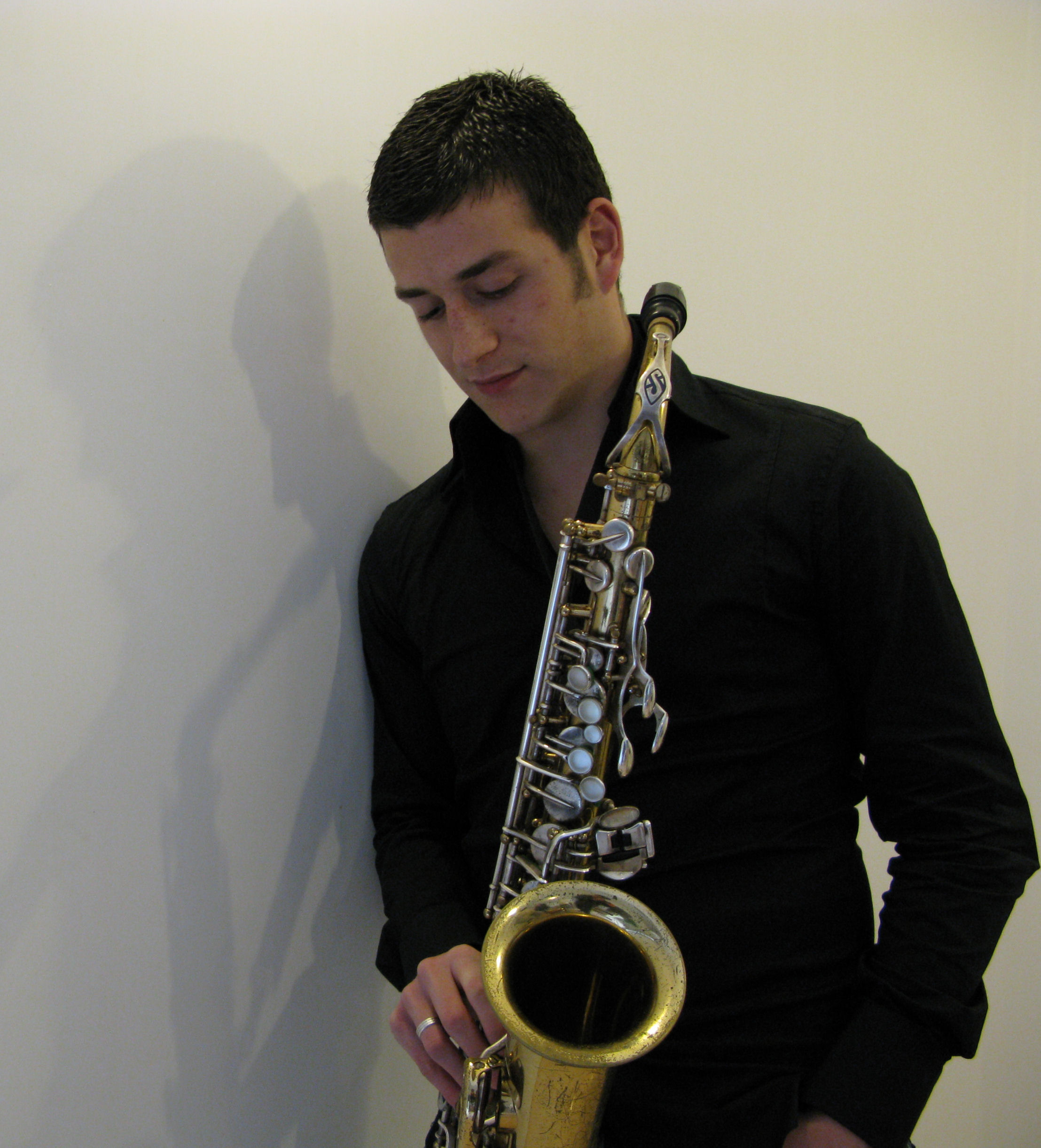

Francesco Cafiso (born 24 May 1989) is an Italian jazz alto saxophonist.

Cafiso was born in Sicily on 24 May 1989. He was successful musically from a young age: he played duets with pianist Franco D'Andrea at the 2002 Umbria Jazz Festival, toured Europe with trumpeter Wynton Marsalis at the age of 14, made his playing debut in the United States in 2004 and the following year recorded the album A Tribute to Charlie Parker with orchestral backing. Part of a concert with D'Andrea at the 2002 Pescara Jazz Festival was later released as the album Standing Ovation Pescara. He went on to record the studio album New York Lullaby for Venus Records at the age of 16. This was followed by Portrait in Black and White and Seven Steps to Heaven, which were quartet albums for the same label. He recorded his eighth album as leader, Angelica, at the age of 19; it was released by CAM Jazz. In 2011, Verve Records released his Moody'n, which was bebop-based and was judged by some critics to be well executed but illustrative of Cafiso's lack of innovation.

For the following three years Cafiso did not record and toured much less than before. He re-emerged with a new band that was influenced by Sicilian music yet retained jazz sensibilities, and released the three-CD recording 3. Much of the music was written by Cafiso, which was also a change from his earlier career. He attributed some of his musical change to switching from a Selmer Mark VI to a Selmer Reference 54: "The new saxophone is more rigid. It doesn't respond immediately. In looking how to adjust my playing to this new instrument, I found my new sound."
