= Upojenie =

Studio album by Anna Maria Jopek and Friends with Pat Metheny
- Released: 2002
- Recorded: Warsaw, Poland
- Genres: Jazz, folk
- Length: 61:34
- Labels: Warner Music Poland; Nonesuch (international edition)
- Producers: Marcin Kydryński, Pat Metheny

Pat Metheny chronology
Tokyo Day Trip (2008)	Upojenie (2002)	Quartet Live (2009)

Anna Maria Jopek chronology
Nienasycenie (2002)	Upojenie (2002)	Secret (2005)

International Edition Cover

Professional ratings
Review scores
Source	Rating
Allmusic	4/5 stars

Upojenie (English: Ecstasy) is a 2002 collaboration between singer Anna Maria Jopek and guitarist Pat Metheny, recorded in Warsaw, Poland. It features Jopek's compositions and traditional folk song arrangements, as well as some of Metheny's well-known tracks, such as "Are You Going with Me?" and "Follow Me". Finally, there is "Polskie drogi" ("Polish Paths") – a cover of a main theme for a film series of the same title by Andrzej Kurylewicz.

In 2008 an international edition of the album was released by Nonesuch Records. The running order of the selections is different and three additional songs are included.

== Track listing ==
No.	Title	Writer(s)	Length
1.	"Cichy zapada zmrok"	Traditional	3:28
2.	"Przypływ, odpływ, oddech czasu" (Tell Her You Saw Me)	Metheny, Polish lyrics by Magda Czapińska	4:52
3.	"Tam, gdzie nie sięga wzrok" (Follow Me)	Metheny, Lyle Mays, Polish lyrics by Czapińska	3:52
4.	"Biel"	Marcin Kydryński	3:24
5.	"Czarne słowa"	Jopek	5:15
6.	"Letter from Home"	Metheny	2:50
7.	"Are You Going with Me?"	Metheny, Mays	8:34
8.	"Zupełnie inna ja" (Always and Forever)	Metheny, Polish lyrics by Kydryński	4:00
9.	"Mania mienia" (So May It Secretly Begin)	Metheny, Polish lyrics by Andrzej Poniedzielski	3:41
10.	"By on był tu" (Farmer's Trust)	Metheny, Polish lyrics by Poniedzielski	6:58
11.	"Upojenie"	Jopek, Stanisław Grochowiak	4:52
12.	"Piosenka dla Stasia"	Kydryński	3:54
13.	"Me jedyne niebo" (Another Life)	Metheny, Polish lyrics by Kydryński	3:16
14.	"Polskie drogi"	Andrzej Kurylewicz	2:33

2008 International Edition
No.	Title	English Title	Length
1.	"Cichy zapada zmrok"	Here Comes the Silent Dusk	3:26
2.	"Mania mienia"	So May It Secretly Begin	3:41
3.	"Biel"	Whiteness	3:22
4.	"Przypływ, odpływ, oddech czasu..."	High Tide, Low Tide, The Breath of Time...	4:45
5.	"Are You Going with Me?"		8:35
6.	"Czarne słowa"	Black Words	5:13
7.	"Lulajźe Jezuniu"	Polish Christmas Carol	5:14
8.	"Upojenie"	Ecstasy	4:46
9.	"Zupełnie inna ja"	The Different Me	3:56
10.	"Piosenka dla Stasia"	A Song for Stas	3:48
11.	"Letter from Home"		2:49
12.	"Me jedyne niebo"	My Only Heaven	3:18
13.	"By on był tu"	Let It Stay	6:56
14.	"Polskie drogi"	Polish Paths	2:50
15.	"Tam, gdzie nie sięga wzrok"	Further Than the Eye Can See	3:51
16.	"Na całej połaci Śnieg" (live)	The Snow Falls All Over the Place	1:47
17.	"Szepty i łzy" (live)	Whispers and Tears	4:47

- Tracks 7, 16, and 17 are only on the international edition (2008).

== Personnel ==
- Anna Maria Jopek – vocals, electric piano
- Pat Metheny – guitars, guitar synthesizer, 42-string guitar, synthesizers (tracks 1–5 and 7–14)
- Cezary Konrad – drums (tracks 2, 3, 5, 7, and 9–13)
- Leszek Możdżer – piano (tracks 2, 3, 5, 6, and 9–11)
- Pawel Bzim Zarecki – synthesizers, organ, percussion (tracks 2, 3, 5, 7, 9, and 11–13)
- Darek Oleszkiewicz – double bass (tracks 2 and 9–14)
- Wojciech Kowalewski – percussion (tracks 2, 3, 5, 7, and 13)
- Piotr Nazaruk – flute, recorder, hammered dulcimer, banjo, vocals, percussion (tracks 2, 5, and 7)
- Marcin Pospieszalski – bass guitar (tracks 3, 5, and 7)
- Henryk Miśkiewicz – soprano saxophone (tracks 8 and 11)
- Mateusz Pospieszalski – synthesizer (tracks 9 and 13)
- Mino Cinelu – percussion (tracks 11 and 13)
- Orchestra conducted by Mateusz Pospieszalski (tracks 9 and 13)
- Bernard Maseli – vibraphone (track 9)
- Marek Napiórkowski – guitar (track 11)
- Barney – alien vocals (track 7)

== Charts and certifications ==
=== Weekly charts ===
Chart (2002)	Peak position
Polish Albums (ZPAV)	1

Chart (2008)	Peak position
US World Albums (Billboard)	9

=== Certifications ===
Region	Certification	Certified units/sales
Poland (ZPAV)	Platinum	70,000^{*}
^{*} Sales figures based on certification alone.
