= Unity Band =

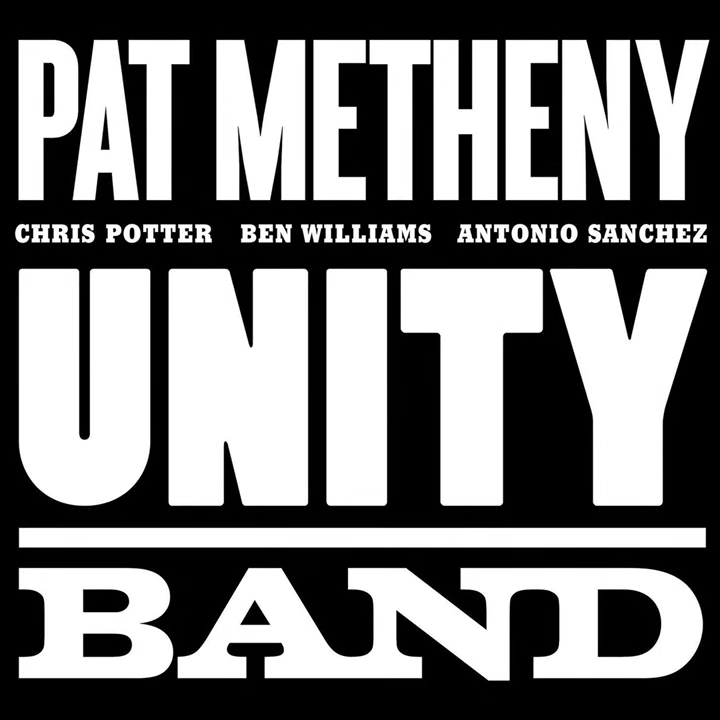

Studio album by Pat Metheny, Chris Potter, Ben Williams, Antonio Sánchez
- Released: June 12, 2012
- Recorded: February 2012
- Studio: Avatar (New York City)
- Genre: Jazz
- Length: 65:49
- Label: Nonesuch
- Producer: Pat Metheny

Pat Metheny chronology
What's It All About (2011)	Unity Band (2012)	The Orchestrion Project (2013)

Professional ratings
Review scores
Source	Rating
Allmusic	4/5 stars
The Observer	4/5 stars
BBC	favorable
The Guardian	4/5 stars
The Independent on Sunday	3/5 stars

Unity Band is a studio album by jazz guitarist Pat Metheny along with saxophonist Chris Potter, bassist Ben Williams and drummer Antonio Sánchez. The album was released through Nonesuch Records on June 12, 2012, and received the Grammy Award for Best Jazz Instrumental Album during the 2013 Grammy Awards, marking Metheny's 20th Grammy win.

== Track listing ==
All music is composed by Pat Metheny.

No.	Title	Length
1.	"New Year"	7:37
2.	"Roofdogs"	5:33
3.	"Come and See"	8:28
4.	"This Belongs to You"	5:20
5.	"Leaving Town"	6:24
6.	"Interval Waltz"	6:26
7.	"Signals (Orchestrion Sketch)"	11:26
8.	"Then and Now"	5:57
9.	"Breakdealer"	8:34
Total length:		65:49

== Personnel ==
- Pat Metheny – acoustic and electric guitars, guitar synthesizer, orchestrionics
- Chris Potter – tenor and soprano saxophone, bass clarinet
- Ben Williams – double bass
- Antonio Sánchez – drums

=== Technical personnel ===
- Pat Metheny – producer
- Steve Rodby – associate producer
- Robert Hurwitz – executive producer
- James Farber – recording
- Pete Karam – mixing
- Ted Jensen – mastering at Sterling Sound, NYC, USA
- Barbara De Wilde – artwork
- Jack Vartoogian, Jimmy Katz – photography

== Charts ==
Chart (2012)	Peak position
US Billboard 200	146
US Billboard Top Jazz Albums	2

== Awards ==
Grammy Awards

Year	Category
2013	Grammy Award for Best Jazz Instrumental Album
