= Anna Maria Jopek =

Polish musician (born 1970)

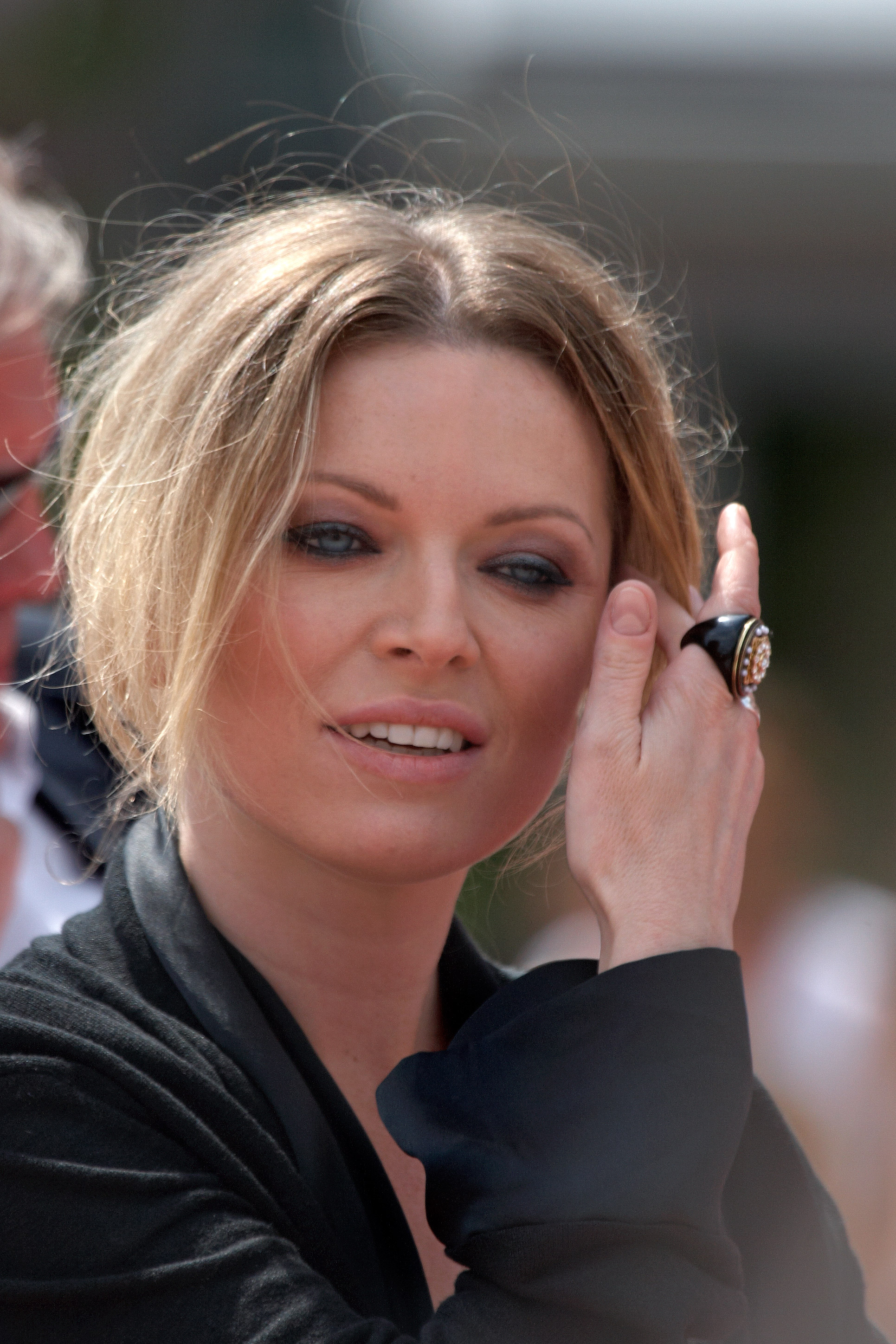
- Anna Maria Jopek in July 2008
- Born: 14 December 1970 (age 55); Warsaw, Poland
- Education: Fryderyk Chopin University of Music
- Occupations: Singer, songwriter, musician
- Spouse: Marcin Kydryński
- Children: 2 (sons)
- Parent(s): Stanisław Jopek; Maria Stankiewicz
- Relatives: Patrycja Jopek (sister)
- Musical career
- Genres: World music, jazz, pop
- Instruments: Vocals, keyboards
- Years active: 1995–present
- Labels: PolyGram Polska, Universal Music Poland, AMJ Music
- Website: Official site

Anna Maria Jopek (born 14 December 1970) is a Polish vocalist, songwriter, and improviser. She represented Poland in the Eurovision Song Contest 1997, with the song "Ale jestem" and finished 11th out of 25 participating acts; and in 2002, she collaborated on an album with jazz guitarist Pat Metheny. She has received numerous awards for her music, including Michel Legrand's Personal Award in Vitebsk in 1994, as well as all of the awards for music in Poland, together with gold and platinum records.

== Biography ==
She is the daughter of Mazowsze singer Stanisław Jopek (1935–2006), known as the "First Coachman of Poland" for his signature song "Furman" (The Coachman), and former Mazowsze dancer Maria Stankiewicz. Her 1999 Christmas album, Dzisiaj z Betleyem, features two duets with her father. Anna Maria's sister, Patrycja is a violinist.

In Poland, she has sung with Marek Grechuta, Jeremi Przybora and Wojciech Młynarski. Abroad, she has performed with Pat Metheny, Youssu'n Dour, Bobby McFerrin, Ivan Linz, Branford Marsalis, Nigel Kennedy, Richard Bona, Oscar Castro-Neves, Makoto Ozone and Gonzalo Rubalcaba among others. In 2017, Jopek sang a duet with Sting on a New Year's TV program.

Jopek has performed at the world's leading concert venues such as Carnegie Hall, Hollywood Bowl, Royal Festival Hall, Tokyo Opera City Concert Hall, Blue Note Tokyo, The Israeli Opera in Tel Aviv or Hamer Hall in Melbourne. She has recorded at Peter Gabriel's Real World studio, Abbey Road in London, and Power Station in New York.

In 2015, she received the Knight's Cross Order of Polonia Restituta conferred by President Bronisław Komorowski for promoting Polish art worldwide.

In 2019, Jopek released a new album "Ulotne" (Elusive) with Branford Marsalis.

In 2021, she launched a concert project titled "Przestworza" (The Expanses), which toured Poland's major concert venues in August of that year.

Over the past few years, Jopek has been experimenting with various stage forms. She has performed in "Czas Kobiety" (A Woman's Time), a play staged at Teatr Stary in Lublin, directed by the legend of Polish theatre – professor Leszek Mądzik. The music was written by Jopek and Robert Kubiszyn. In 2014, she accepted Song of the Goat Theatre's invitation to perform in an oratory "Return to the Voice". They held a series of performances over a month as part of the Edinburgh Fringe Festival, where she was noticed by Michael Hirst, creator of HISTORY's flagship series Vikings. The producers offered her to record a song to be featured in the show.

== Discography ==
=== Solo albums ===
Title	Album details	Peak chart positions	Sales	Certifications
Title	Album details	POL	Sales	Certifications
Ale jestem	Released: 22 November 1997; Label: Mercury/PolyGram Poland; Formats: CD	–	POL: 50,000+	POL: Gold
Szeptem	Released: 6 June 1998; Label: Mercury/PolyGram Poland; Formats: CD	38	POL: 200,000+	POL: 2× Platinum
Jasnosłyszenie	Released: 26 March 1999; Label: Mercury/PolyGram Poland; Formats: CD	–	POL: 50,000+	POL: Gold
Dzisiaj z Betleyem	Released: 8 November 1999; Label: Universal Music Poland; Formats: CD	–		
Bosa	Released: 14 September 2000; Label: Universal Music Poland; Formats: CD, digital download	3	POL: 50,000+	POL: Gold
Barefoot	Released: 28 February 2002; Label: Universal Music Poland; Formats: CD	–		
Nienasycenie	Released: 25 March 2002; Label: Universal Music Poland; Formats: CD	1	POL: 35,000+	POL: Gold
Secret	Released: 13 June 2005; Label: Universal Music Poland; Formats: CD, digital download	3		
Niebo	Released: 24 October 2005; Label: Universal Music Poland; Formats: CD, CD+DVD, digital download	2		
ID	Released: 11 May 2007; Label: Universal Music Poland; Formats: CD, digital download	1	POL: 30,000+	POL: Platinum
Sobremesa	Released: 14 October 2011; Label: Universal Music Poland; Formats: CD, digital download	5	POL: 30,000+	POL: Platinum
Polanna	Released: 14 October 2011; Label: Universal Music Poland; Formats: CD, digital download	14	POL: 15,000+	POL: Gold
"—" denotes a recording that did not chart or was not released in that territory.

=== Collaborative albums ===
Title	Album details	Peak chart positions	Sales	Certifications
Title	Album details	POL	Sales	Certifications
Upojenie (with Pat Metheny)	Released: 1 December 2002; Label: Warner Music Poland; Formats: CD, digital download	1	POL: 70,000+	POL: Platinum
Haiku (with Makoto Ozone)	Released: 14 October 2011; Label: Universal Music Poland; Formats: CD, digital download	17	POL: 30,000+	POL: Platinum
Minione (with Gonzalo Rubalcaba)	Released: 3 February 2017; Label: Universal Music Poland; Formats: CD, album, digital download	—	POL: 60,000+	POL: 2× Platinum
Ulotne (with Branford Marsalis)	Released: 14 December 2018; Label: Anna Maria Jopek Music AMJ002; Formats: album	—	POL: 30,000+	POL: Platinum
"—" denotes a recording that did not chart or was not released in that territory.

=== Live albums ===
Title	Album details	Peak chart positions	Sales	Certifications
Title	Album details	POL	Sales	Certifications
Farat	Released: 16 November 2003; Label: Universal Music Poland; Formats: CD, digital download	2	POL: 35,000+	POL: Gold
JO & CO	Released: 17 October 2009; Label: Universal Music Poland; Formats: CD, digital download	4	POL: 15,000+	POL: Gold
"—" denotes a recording that did not chart or was not released in that territory.

=== Compilation albums ===
Title	Album details	Peak chart positions	Sales	Certifications
Title	Album details	POL	Sales	Certifications
Anna Maria Jopek	Released: 26 July 2006; Label: Universal Music Poland; Formats: CD (Box set)	—	POL: 5,000+	POL: Gold
Dwa serduszka, cztery oczy	Released: 14 December 2008; Label: Universal Music Poland; Formats: CD (Box set)	47		
Lustra	Released: 14 October 2011; Label: Universal Music Poland; Formats: CD (Box set)	12		
"—" denotes a recording that did not chart or was not released in that territory.

=== Video albums ===
Title	Album details	Sales	Certifications
Farat	Released: 2003; Label: Universal Music Poland; Formats: DVD	POL: 10,000+	POL: Platinum

=== Music videos ===
Title	Year	Directed
"Inna"	1995	—
"Ale jestem"	1996	—
"Joszko Broda"	1997	Dariusz Błaszczyk
"Nie przychodzisz mi do głowy"	1997	—
"Ja wysiadam"	1999	—
"Na całej połaci śnieg"	1999	—
"Wspomnienie" with Michał Żebrowski	1999	—
"Szepty i łzy"	2000	Bolesław Pawica, Jarek Szoda
"Na dłoni"	2002	—
"I pozostanie tajemnicą"	2002	—
"Cichy zapada zmrok"	2003	—
"Możliwe"	2003	—
"Tam, gdzie nie sięga wzrok"	2004	—
"Don't Speak"	2005	—
"Gdy mówią mi"	2005	—
"Sypka Warszawa"	2009	Adrian Panek

Awards and achievements
Preceded by Kasia Kowalska with "Chcę znać swój grzech..."	Poland in the Eurovision Song Contest; 1997	Succeeded by Sixteen with "To takie proste"
