= Thana Alexa =

American jazz vocalist and composer (born 1987)

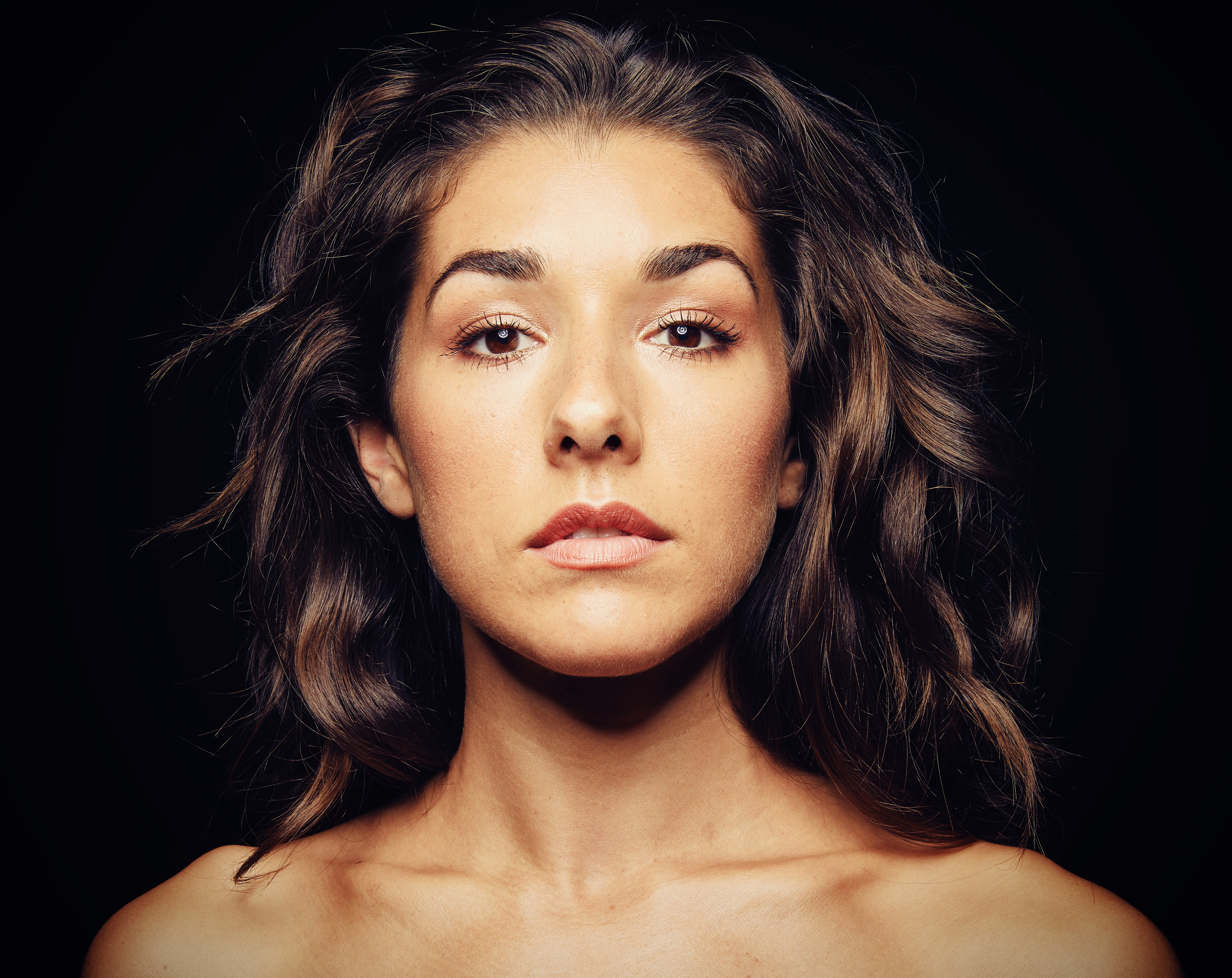

Background information
- Born: March 19, 1987 (age 39); New York City, U.S.
- Genres: Jazz, jazz fusion, contemporary soul, Ethno jazz
- Occupations: Musician, composer, arranger, producer
- Instruments: Voice, violin
- Website: www.thanalexa.com

Thana Alexa Pavelić (born March 19, 1987) is a jazz vocalist, composer, arranger, and producer. She was nominated for a Grammy Award for Best Jazz Vocal Album for her 2020 recording Ona.

== Early life and education ==
Alexa's interest in music began at age three when she disappeared from a birthday party and was discovered in the basement playing melodies to simple songs on a toy piano. She soon expressed a preference for the violin, and began taking lessons. Although she began to sing during this period, she believed the violin to be her primary instrument and considered pursuing it vocationally.

After elementary school, Alexa's family moved back to Croatia. She began singing songs in English as a way of maintaining her connection to her mother tongue and her childhood in the United States. In Zagreb, Alexa took voice lessons at the Rock Academy. Musician and club owner Boško Petrović mentored her – she began attending regional jazz workshops and performing professionally, including at Croatian festivals.

Alexa studied psychology at Northeastern University before transferring to the New School in New York City; she completed her psychology degree and received a fine arts degree in jazz performance. She cites drummer Bernard Purdie as a mentor during this time.

== Career ==
Her first album as a leader, Ode to Heroes, was released by Jazz Village. She appears on guitarist Gene Ess's album Absurdist Theatre. Alexa has also collaborated with vibraphonist Christos Rafalides. Alexa received a Best Jazz Vocal Album Grammy nomination for her 2020 album Ona; Regina Carter was also nominated for Best Improvised Jazz Solo from the album.

During the 2020 COVID-19 lockdown, Alexa, vocalist Sirintip and saxophonist Owen Broder co-founded what Rolling Stone called the first "virtual jazz festival" and fundraising initiative of the pandemic, Live from Our Living Rooms, which helped facilitate grants to New York-based musicians.

In 2023, Alexa co-founded a jazz festival on the small, car-free island of Lopud off the coast of Dalmatia in Croatia with Tilda Grossel Bogdanović. Alexa serves as the creative director of the Ponta Lopud Jazz Festival, which takes place annually in late August and features artists and music from around the globe.

== Discography ==
=== As leader ===
- SONICA (InsideOut, 2022) - co-led group with Nicole Zuraitis and Julia Adamy
- Ona (Self Release, 2020)
- Ode to Heroes (Jazz Village, 2015)

=== As guest ===
With Antonio Sanchez

- SHIFT: Bad Hombre Volume II (Warner, 2022)
- Lines in the Sand (CAM Jazz, 2018)
- The Meridian Suite (CAM Jazz, 2015)
- New Life (CAM Jazz, 2013)

With others

- Nicole Zuraitis, How Love Begins (La Reserve, 2024)
- Benjamin Koppel, The White Buses (Cowbell Music, 2023)
- Rotem Sivan, Far From Shore (Sonder House, 2023)
- Giraldo Piloto y Klimax, Mucho (Codex, 2022)
- Vladimir Samardzic, Catching the Wind 2022)
- Nicole Zuraitis, Wandering Hearts (2022)
- Purbayan Chatterjee, Unbounded (Abaad) (Sufiscore, 2021)
- Ernesto Cortazar Lara, Within These Walls (2021)
- Michael Olatuja, Lagos Pepper Soup (Whirlwind Recordings, 2020)
- Max Esquivel, Tulips (22020)
- Christos Rafalides, New Day for Marimba and Vocals (Emarel Music Inc, 2018)
- Gene Ess, Apotheosis (SIMP, 2018)
- Nicole Zuraitis, Long Meadow Vine (The Wine Song) [feat. Cyrille Aimée & Thana Alexa] (2017)
- Gene Ess, Absurdist Theatre (SIMP, 2016)
- Gene Ess, Eternal Monolith (SIMP, 2015)
- Gene Ess, Fractal Attraction (SIMP, 2013)
- Matija Dedic, Friends (Dallas, 2010)
