= CAM Jazz =

- Parent company: Kepach Music Group
- Founded: 2000
- Genre: Jazz
- Country of origin: Italy
- Location: Rome
- Official website: camjazz.com

CAM Jazz is an Italian jazz record label founded in 2000. It is part of group that also manages the labels CAM Jazz Presents, Black Saint/Soul Note, and DDQ (Dischi Della Quercia). The label's musicians have received several Grammy Award nominations.

CAM (Creazioni Artistiche Musicali) Jazz began as a branch of a company that issued movie soundtracks. Its catalogue is managed by producer Ermanno Basso. Early releases by the label were from Italian musicians such as drummer Roberto Gatto, trumpeter Enrico Rava, bassist Giovanni Tommaso, and pianist Enrico Pieranunzi, who recorded Play Morricone in a trio with bassist Marc Johnson and drummer Joey Baron. CAM Jazz signed Argentinian trumpeter Diego Urcola, Venezuelan pianist Edward Simon, and Italian saxophonist Francesco Cafiso when he was 16. The catalogue also includes American trumpeter Dave Douglas, Canadian trumpeter Kenny Wheeler, French pianist Martial Solal, Swedish bassist Palle Danielsson, American jazz ensemble Oregon and British drummer Martin France.

== Awards and honors ==
Grammy nominations

- 2006: What Now? by Kenny Wheeler, Best Jazz Instrumental Album
- 2007: Viva by Diego Urcola, Best Latin Jazz Album
- 2008: 1000 Kilometers by Oregon, Best Jazz Instrumental Solo (Paul McCandless); Best Instrumental Composition
- 2010: Martial Solal Live at the Village Vanguard by Martial Solal, Best Improvised Jazz Solo

== Associated labels ==
- Black Saint/Soul Note
- CAM Jazz
- CAM Jazz Presents
- Cam-Amico
- Cam-Campieditore
- Cam-Det
- Cam-Gong
- Cam-Phoenix
- Cam-TV Film
- Cam-TV Sorrisi E Canzoni
- Phoenix
