= Ugo Marotta =

- Born: Ugo Marotta; September 23, 1942
- Origin: Rio de Janeiro, Brazil
- Genres: Bossa Nova; MPB
- Occupations: Musician, composer, songwriter, arranger
- Instruments: Vibraphone, keyboard
- Years active: 1960 – present

Ugo Marotta (September 23, 1942 in Rio de Janeiro) is a Brazilian musician, conductor, arranger, composer, keyboardist and vibraphonist. He took part at the Brazilian music movements Bossa Nova and Musicanossa.

== Biography ==
Born in Rio de Janeiro, he participated at the evening musical get-togethers at Nara Leão's place, the cradle of the musical style Bossa Nova. Other important names like Tom Jobim, Roberto Menescal, Carlos Lyra, Sérgio Mendes and Ronaldo Bôscoli were also active participants.

In 1963, together with Eumir Deodato, Sérgio Barrozo, João Palma and Roberto Menescal, he recorded his first LP, A Bossa Nova de Roberto Menescal e Seu Conjunto, playing vibraphone. Titles like "Desafinado", "Batida diferente", "Você e eu" and "Só danço samba" included on this LP, released by the label "Elenco", became some of the Bossa Nova hits. The following year, the band produced the new album: A Nova Bossa Nova de Roberto Menescal e Seu Conjunto, which also included hits like "Samba de verão", "Só tinha de ser com você" and "Bolinha de papel". Apart from playing the vibraphone, Marotta also arranged and composed some of the songs for this second LP.

During the Bossa Nova movement, he worked and recorded with several well-known Brazilian artists and bands (Maysa, Sylvia Telles, Carlos Lyra, Marcos Valle, Eumir Deodato), playing and arranging songs that became some of the Bossa Nova icons.

In 1968, he produced and directed the "Música Nossa" movement, along with Roberto Menescal, Mário Telles, Paulo Sérgio Valle and Tibério Gaspar.

Marotta, whose first vibraphone was constructed by himself, came back to the musical scene on a new record with the harmonic player Maurício Einhorn. The album, a compilation of Oscar-winning songs, was released in 1975, by the extinct Philips label.

Ugo Marotta also worked as arranger and composer of advertisements and movie soundtracks. His filmography includes As Aventuras de Sergio Mallandro, Os Fantasmas Trapalhões e Urubus e Papagaios.

Nowadays he works as a music arranger and producer, being his latest records: Tributo a Tom Jobim, with Cláudia Telles, Tributo a Art Blakey and Quarenta, with Pascoal Meirelles

== Discography ==
- Roberto Menescal e Seu Conjunto – A Bossa Nova de Roberto Menescal e Seu Conjunto (Elenco/Universal Music) – Vibraphone, arranger and composer
- Roberto Menescal e Seu Conjunto – A Nova Bossa Nova de Roberto Menescal e Seu Conjunto (1964, Elenco/Polygram) – Vibraphone, arranger and composer
- Roberto Menescal e Seu Conjunto – Bossa Nova (1962 ou 1964, Imperial) – Vibraphone
- Maysa – Maysa (1964, Elenco/Universal Music) – Vibraphone
- Marcos Valle – Samba Demais (1964, Odeon/EMI) – Vibraphone
- Pacífico Mascarenhas – Sambacana (1964, Odeon) – Arranger
- Wanda Sá – Wanda Vagamente (1965, RGE/Dubas Música) – Vibraphone
- Samba Session (1965)
- Sylvia Telles – The Music of Mr. Jobim By Sylvia Telles (1965)
- Aracy de Almeida – Samba é Aracy de Almeida (1966, Elenco/Universal Music) – Arranger, organ and piano
- Sylvia Telles – It Might As Well Be Spring (1966, Elenco/Dubas Música) – Vibraphone
- Quarteto em Cy – Quarteto em Cy (1966, Elenco/Universal Music) – Arranger and composer
- Quarteto em Cy and Tamba Trio – Som definitivo (1966, Forma/Bomba Records) – Arranger
- Roberto Menescal e Seu Conjunto – Surf Board (1967, Elenco/Universal Music) – Vibraphone, arranger
- Quarteto 004 – Retrato em Branco e Preto (1968)
- Quarteto em Cy – Em Cy maior (1968) – Arranger
- Tito Madi – Compacto Simples (1969)
- Ugo Marotta & Os Folks – Baião Rides Again (1973)
- Sivan Castelo Neto – Sivan Castelo Neto – 60 anos de música (1966, Elenco/Universal Music) – Producer, arranger and keyboards
- Vários – The Oscar Winners (1975, Philips) – Produtor e arranger
- Jorge Ben – SOLTA O PAVÃO (1975, Philips) – Arranger
- Vários – A Era de Ouro da Música Italiana – Il Cantanti di Bruno Marotta (1977, Phonogram/Fontana) – Producer and arranger
- Alcyr Pires Vermelho – Alcyr Pires Vermelho – 50 Anos de Música (1985)
- Various artists – A Trip to Brazil – 40 Years of Bossa Nova (1988, Motor Music GmbH) – Vibraphone
- Various artists – Chega De Saudade – The Best of Bossa Nova (1993, EMI) – Vibraphone
- Various artists – A Trip to Brazil: Bossa Nova & Beyond (2000, Emarcy)
- Various artists- Bossa Nova Lounge – Collection (2003) – Arranger and vibraphone
- Marcos Valle – Marcos Valle – Antologia (2004, EMI) – Vibraphone
- Claudia Telles – Tributo a Tom Jobim (2004, CID) – Producer, arranger and keyboards
- Gabriel Guerra – Bossa, MPB e Eu (2005)
- Pascoal Meirelles – Quarenta (2006, Rob Digital) – Producer
- Pascoal Meirelles – Tributo a Art Blakey (2008, Rob Digital) – Producer
- Roberto Menescal – Roberto Menescal – Coleção Folha 50 Anos de Bossa Nova (2008) – Vibraphone

== See also ==
- Bossa nova
- Musicanossa
