= Camille (American singer) =

American singer

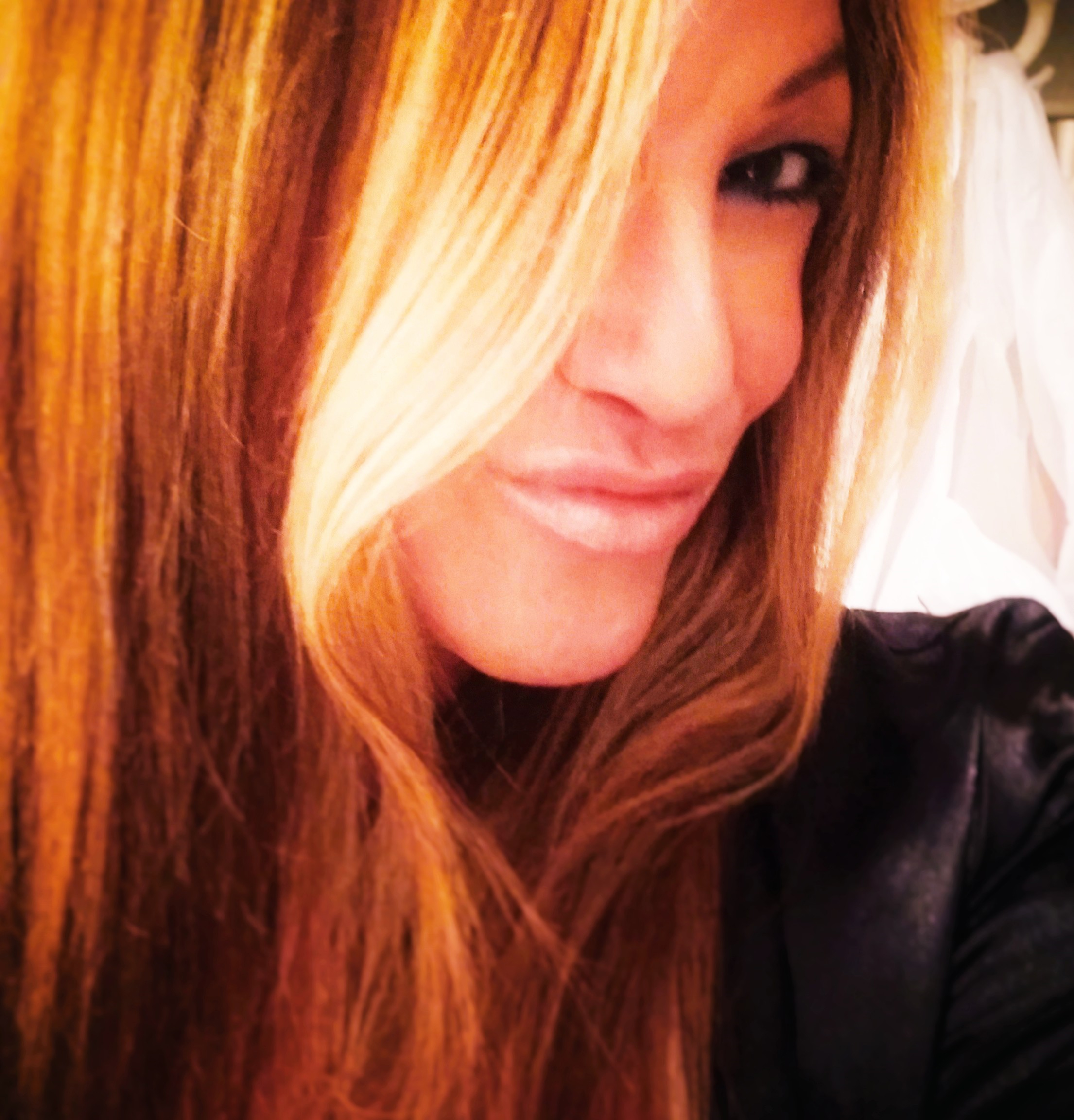
- Camille in 2015

Background information
- Born: Camille Marie Filfiley; 8 April 1963 (age 63); Brooklyn, New York, U.S.
- Genres: Dance, R&B, freestyle
- Occupation: Singer
- Instrument: Vocals
- Labels: Camilleon, Martru, 4th & B'way
- Website: www.camillemusic.net

Camille Filfiley, known professionally as Camille, is an American singer best known for her recordings with Eumir Deodato and her prominence in the early 1990s dance and freestyle music genres.

== Biography and music career ==
Camille began singing at the age of seven, and by age 11 was performing professionally in New York City with appearances at notable Manhattan clubs like The Improv and Catch A Rising Star. She achieved her first radio success in 1985 after getting hired by recording artist and hit producer Eumir Deodato. Camille was the featured vocalist on Deodato's album Motion, singing on the hits "S.O.S., Fire in the Sky" and "Are You for Real" (each credited on the album as Deodato featuring Camille). The songs reached #6 and #17 respectively on the Billboard Hot Dance Chart and stayed on the chart for a combined 26 weeks. "S.O.S., Fire In The Sky" was also an international hit, reaching the top of the charts in the Netherlands and France. Camille performed live dates for the next two years in support of the Deodato album. It was during this time that she became established in New York's "Garage music" scene, which originated in the historic Paradise Garage dance club and was popularized by DJs Larry Levan and Tony Humphries.

In the 1990s, she followed with several solo releases for the record labels 4th & B'way Records and Martru Records (all credited as Camille), and was the lead singer for Rhythm Method on the label ZYX Music (credited as Rhythm Method featuring Camille). Camille also picked up numerous album credits as background or featured vocalist for many top Freestyle music artists, including The Cover Girls, TKA, Concept of One, Tony Moran, Latin Rascals, Angel Civiles and others. The TKA session was a cover of Deodato's "Are You For Real" for their album Louder Than Love (credited on the album as TKA featuring Camille). In the process she met TKA member Louis Sharpe, who used the stage name Kayel with TKA and later K7 as a solo artist. This led to Camille singing on K7's hip-hop hit "Come Baby Come" in 1993 (credited as Camille Shea, her married name). The song reached #18 on the Billboard Hot 100 Chart and #3 on the UK Singles Chart, and was RIAA certified gold. It has since been released on more than 40 compilation or soundtrack albums, most notably Jock Jams, Volume 1 on Tommy Boy Records which was RIAA certified double platinum. The song was also prominently featured in the 2006 Touchstone Pictures movie Stick It starring Jeff Bridges, as well as the 2016 New Line Cinema movie How to Be Single starring Dakota Johnson, Rebel Wilson and Leslie Mann. On the original recording session for "Come Baby Come", Camille improvised a vocal scat, which was then used by the producer as a repeating hook throughout the song. Although Camille came up with the vocal line, she did not receive any writing credit for the song.

In 1995, "S.O.S., Fire in the Sky" was included on the Rhino Records compilation The Disco Years, Vol 6: Everybody Dance, which AllMusic considered a "wise choice" for its inclusion. The song was also released on the compilation Hi-NRG Dance Classics the same year, with Camille receiving equal billing as co-performer with Deodato. 1997, she released an eponymous album of jazz standards titled Camille Filfiley, the only time in her career she would use her full birth name. Her promotion for the album included a televised live performance and interview on PBS. In 2003 Camille recorded with the Latin Head Huntrz on their self-titled album for Sound Factory Records, most notably as the featured vocalist on a remake of the Jefferson Airplane classic "White Rabbit" (song title listed as "White Rabbit featuring Camille").

She continued a regular schedule of studio work throughout the 2000s, while her earlier hits with Deodato and others were reissued on numerous compilation albums including Choice: A Collection Of Classics by Tony Humphries (2003), Happy Hour / Motion (2005) and The Greatest Hits (2006), both by Deodato, and Disco Discharge: Gay Disco & Hi-NRG (2009) which was credited to various artists and received a 4-star rating on AllMusic.

In 2014 she formed her own record label Camilleon Records and released a solo album I Sing Stevie: The Stevie Wonder Songbook. The album featured the songs of Stevie Wonder and included many top session players, including Will Lee, Mitchel Forman, Horacio "El Negro" Hernandez, Marc Quiñones and others. It received positive reviews, with Bass Musician Magazine commenting, "Camille has serious vocal skills and a wealth of experience that makes her the perfect performer to attempt this musical Mount Everest". Famed jazz historian Scott Yanow wrote "One of the many joys of I Sing Stevie is hearing Camille giving fresh interpretations to a variety of mostly lesser-known Stevie Wonder songs. Her love for the music is obvious, as is her talented singing. One suspects that Stevie Wonder would love this CD." In March 2015, the album was nominated for Best Tribute Album in the 14th Annual Independent Music Awards. In 2017 Camille received nominations for two JPF Music Awards, including Best Tribute Album for I Sing Stevie: The Stevie Wonder Songbook and Best Cover Song for "They Won't Go When I Go".

== Musical influences ==
In a 2014 interview with SmoothJazz.com, Camille said that her biggest vocal influences were Stevie Wonder, Joni Mitchell, Carmen McRae and Barbra Streisand, while crediting the recordings of Oscar Peterson for her early musical development and ear training.

== Discography ==
Year	Title	Artist	Label
1984	Motion	Deodato	Warner Bros.
1984	"S.O.S., Fire in the Sky" (single)	Deodato feat. Camille	Warner Bros.
1985	"Are You for Real" (single)	Deodato feat. Camille	Warner Bros.
1988	"There's No Party Here" (single)	Camille	4th & B'way
1990	Louder Than Love	TKA feat. Camille	Tommy Boy Records
1991	"I've Been Thinking About You" (single)	Camille	Martru Records
1991	"What's the Need" (single)	Nelson "FFWD" Cruz feat. Camille	Cruzin' Nelson Records
1991	"Can You Give Me Love" (single)	Rhythm Method feat. Camille	ZYX Records
1992	"My Love Will Set You Free" (single)	Camille	Martru Records
1992	Here It Is	The Cover Girls	Epic
1993	Concept of One	Concept of One	Cutting Records
1993	Swing Batta Swing	K7	Tommy Boy
1993	"Come Baby Come" (single)	K7	Tommy Boy
1994	"Zunga Zeng (FUN Mob Remix)" (single)	K7	Tommy Boy
1997	Camille Filfiley	Camille Filfiley	RS Jazz
2003	Sound Factory Sessions Vol. 1	Latin Headhuntrz feat. Camille	Sound Factory Records
2006	Stick It (Original Soundtrack)	Various Artists	Hollywood Records
2007	The Greatest Hits	Deodato	High Fashion
2014	I Sing Stevie: The Stevie Wonder Songbook	Camille	Camilleon Records
