= Aly-Us =

American house music group

Aly-Us was a house-music group from New Jersey that was active mostly in the early 1990s. Its most famous record was "Follow Me" from 1992.

== Members and history ==
Aly-Us originally started as a trio composed of vocalist Eddie L. Lewis a.k.a. "Supa", DJ Kyle "Small" Smith, and vocalist William Brian Jennings. The group was active until 1996. Lewis revived the name Aly-Us on his own in the early 2010s. He died on June 7, 2025.

== "Follow Me" ==
"Follow Me"

Single by Aly-Us
- Released: 1992
- Recorded: 1992
- Genre: Deep house, garage house, New Jersey sound
- Length: 6:15 (club mix)
- Label: Strictly Rhythm
- Songwriters: W.B. Jennings, E.L. Lewis, K. Smith
- Producer: Kyle "Small" Smith

Music videos
- "Follow Me" on YouTube

"Follow Me", a deep house track produced and mixed by Kyle Smith, on which DJ Pierre and George Morel served as executive producers, was released in 1992 on the Strictly Rhythm record label. The record became an underground club hit and is considered one of the classics of the house genre for its uplifting spirit and "its unapologetically optimistic lyrics".

=== Remixes and features ===
In 2002, a remix by Full Intention of "Follow Me" peaked at No. 8 on Billboard's Dance Club Songs chart.

In 2012, the English electronic band Hot Chip named the song one of its essential summer cookout songs.

In 2016, the track was included on NPR's playlist commemorating the Pulse nightclub terrorist attack in Orlando, Florida. Moby included the track on an accompanying double-CD from his memoir.

Parisian-born DJ and producer Erik Hagleton remixed the song in 2017.

== See also ==
- Club Zanzibar – historic Black electronic music venue in Newark
- Tony Humphries
- New Jersey house
