= Madhouse =

Madhouse may refer to:

- Madhouse, a colloquial term for a psychiatric hospital
- Madhouse, the nickname given to the double-1 in darts

== Books ==
- Archie's Mad House, a comic book series published by Archie Comics
- Madhouse: A Tragic Tale of Megalomania and Modern Medicine, a 2005 book
- Madhouse (2008 novel), by Rob Thurman
- Madhouse (magazine), Argentine heavy metal magazine

== Film ==
- Madhouse (1974 film) featuring Vincent Price
- Madhouse (1981 film), an Italian horror film
- Madhouse (1990 film) starring Kirstie Alley and John Larroquette
- Madhouse (2004 film) starring Joshua Leonard

== Music ==
- Madhouse Records (British record label)
- Madhouse Records (Jamaican record label)
- Madhouse (band), an American band that was a side project for Prince
- Madhouse, a Romanian band featuring Ovidiu Lipan
- Madhouse, an American gothic rock band by Monica Richards
- Mad'House, a French house music project group that did cover songs of Madonna

=== Albums ===
- Madhouse: The Very Best of Anthrax, an album by Anthrax
- Madhouse (Silver Convention album), a 1976 album by Silver Convention

=== Songs ===
- "Madhouse" (song), by the thrash metal band Anthrax
- "Madhouse", a song from Little Mix's album DNA
- "Mad House", a song from the Armored Saint album March of the Saint
- "Mad House", song from Rihanna's 2009 album Rated R
- "Madhouse", a song from Nessa Barrett's first album Young Forever

== Television ==
- Madhouse, a 1980–1985 British TV comedy series starring Russ Abbot
- MadHouse, a 2010 American TV series about auto racing

== Other uses ==
- The Madhouse, an 1819 painting by Francisco de Goya
- Madhouse (ride), a type of theme park attraction manufactured by Vekoma
- Madhouse, Inc., a Japanese animation studio
- Bowman Gray Stadium's nickname

== See also ==
- Madhouse on Madison (disambiguation)
