= Kátya Chamma =

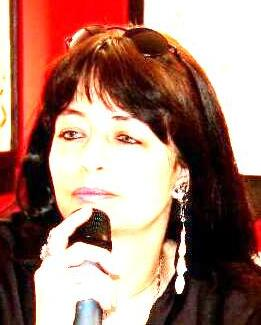
- Chamma in 2013

Background information
- Born: Kátya Pujals Chamma; August 19, 1961
- Origin: Brasília, DF, Brazil
- Genres: Pop rock, Música popular brasileira, blues
- Occupations: Composer, singer and poet
- Instruments: Vocals, guitar
- Website: http://www.katyachamma.com

Kátya Pujals Chamma (born August 19, 1961) is a Brazilian songwriter, singer, poet, writer and cultural producer.

== Early life ==
Chamma was born in Brasília, Distrito Federal, From the first generation of Brasília's artists, she acted in the main theaters, shows and events. She won some music festivals, like the 1° Brasílias' Open MPB Festival. She was presented at radio, TV and media jingles.

== Career ==
In the 1990s, she produced, idealized and presented the daily television program Capital Destaque, talk-show with special approach for the cultural area.

In 2000, she made a special appearance in the show of Roberto Menescal and Wanda Sá, in Brasília.

In 2003, she launched the album Katya Chamma, with the guest performance of Roberto Menescal.

In 2005, she published the book Dança de Espelhos, that congregates poems, chronicles, assays and haicais (haiku).

In 2006, the Jornal das Gravadoras (Periodical of the Recorders) points Katya Chamma as one of the illustrious representative greaters of Brazilian independent music and Example of independent art (edition 106).

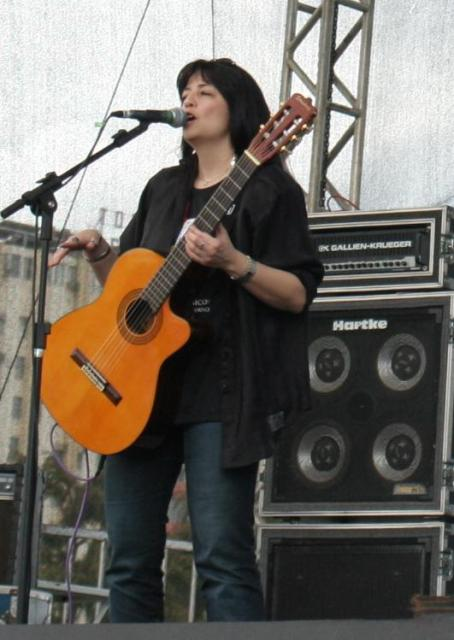
Chamma in 2008

Kátya Chamma has her verbete in the Illustrated Houaiss Dictionary of Brazilian Popular Music. She also has her entry in the Cravo Albin Brazilian Popular Music Dictionary online.

In 2010, brings to the stages from Brasília the first edition of her "Project Gallera Rock", cultural project that aims to disseminate the art and the independent music scene, promoting bands and performances by young artists through concerts, festivals and shows. The project, conceived and produced by Katya Chamma, develops an alternative circuit to the disclosure of a new generation of talent.

In 2011, she participated in the CD compilation "News From Brazil", released by the music label Sonarts. Also in 2011, takes to the stages from Brasília the 2nd edition of the project "Gallera Rock." In the same year, she entered the Academy of Letters of Taguatinga, Distrito Federal.

In 2012, her project "Gallera Rock" celebrates the 3rd edition, and honors the artists who were present in the three Project editions with the title "Gallera Rock Star".

In early 2013, on the occasion of the birthday festivities of the Clube Caiubi de Compositores, the artist receives the Medal of Merit. In August 2013, participated in the Collection "Letristas em Cena", organized by the Clube Caiubi de Compositores. In September 2013, participated in the CD compilation "A Nova MPB, vol.1", released by Clube Caiubi. In November 2013, participated in the CD compilation "A Nova MPB, vol.2", released by Clube Caiubi de Compositores. In December 2013, brings to the stages from Brasília the 4th edition of her "Project Gallera Rock". In the same year, she entered the Academy of Letters of Brazil.

In 2014, her project "Gallera Rock" celebrates the 5th edition, solidifying itself as a traditional and active cultural project in the alternative music scene.

Katya Chamma received the Commendation "Paul Harris Title" of Rotary International.

Her book "No Tempo das Romãs" is now in press and will be released later in 2017, as reported on the website of the artist.

== Discography ==
- 2003 – Katya Chamma (Studio Album).
- 2011 – News From Brazil – Sonarts music label – Collection.
- 2013 – A Nova MPB, vol.1 – Clube Caiubi – Collection.
- 2013 – A Nova MPB, vol.2 – Clube Caiubi – Collection.

== Literature ==
- Chamma, Katya. Dança de Espelhos – Zarabatana e outros poemas. Brasília, DF, Brazil: Independent (2005).
- Vários Autores. Letristas Em Cena – Coletânea. Clube Caiubi de Compositores. Piracicaba: Editora Sotaques (2013).

== Other sources ==
- Amaral, Euclides (2010). Alguns Aspectos Da MPB. Rio de Janeiro: Esteio Editora. Biblioteca Nacional/Registro: 433.708.
- ALBIN, Ricardo Cravo (2006). Dicionário Houaiss Ilustrado Música Popular Brasileira. Rio de Janeiro: Instituto Antônio Houaiss, Instituto Cultural Cravo Albin e Editora Paracatu.
