= Kerri Chandler =

American DJ and record producer (born 1969)

- Also known as: Third Generation
- Born: September 28, 1969 (age 56)
- Origin: East Orange, New Jersey, U.S.
- Genres: Deep house; garage house
- Occupations: DJ; record producer
- Years active: 1990–present
- Labels: Madhouse, MadTech, Ibadan
- Website: Official website

Kerri Camar Chandler (born September 28, 1969) is an American DJ and record producer. He has been dubbed a pioneer within house music, a genre in which he has an "eclectic brand".

== Biography ==
Chandler's influences go back to New Jersey, growing up in a family of jazz musicians. His father, Joseph Chandler, was a DJ and provided him with a background in the origins of soul, disco, as well as the New York underground sound. Accompanying his father to gigs, he began playing records at the Rally Racquet Club in East Orange, New Jersey at the age of 13.

At 14, he began interning in studios and producing music. Since the release of his first single "SuperLover/Get It Off" on Atlantic Records in 1991, Chandler has released over 100 records. He was a resident DJ at Club Zanzibar in Newark, New Jersey in the 1980s as well, home to the New Jersey sound brand of deep house or garage house.

He is the founder of the house music label Madhouse Records (not to be confused with Dave Kelly's eponymous reggae label) in the United Kingdom, whose signings include Roy Ayers and Dennis Ferrer, but also more recently of MadTech Records, whose roster includes No Artificial Colours, Citizen, Kashii, Waze & Odyssey, as well as Waifs & Strays.

In 2016, he founded his third record label, Kaoz Theory, which has included releases from notable artists such as Jamie Jones, Satoshi Tomiie, Seth Troxler, in addition to the Martinez Brothers.

== Discography ==
=== Studio albums ===
- Hemisphere (1996)
- Kaoz on King Street (1997)
- First Steps (with Dennis Ferrer) (1999)
- Kerri's Jazz Cafe (2000)
- Saturday (with Jerome Sydenham) (2001)
- Trionisphere (2003)
- Computer Games (2008)
- The Thing for Linda 2010
- Spaces and Places (2022)

=== Singles and EPs ===
- "Super Lover" (1990)
- Panic E.P. (1992)
- "Mistery Love" (1993)
- Atmosphere E.P. Vol. 1 (1993)
- Ionosphere EP (1994)
- "Bar a Thym / Sunshine & Twilight" (Nite Grooves) (2005)

=== Remixes ===
- The System - "You're in My System (Atmospheric Vocal)" (1998)
