= Eumir Deodato =

Brazilian pianist, composer, arranger and producer (born 1942)

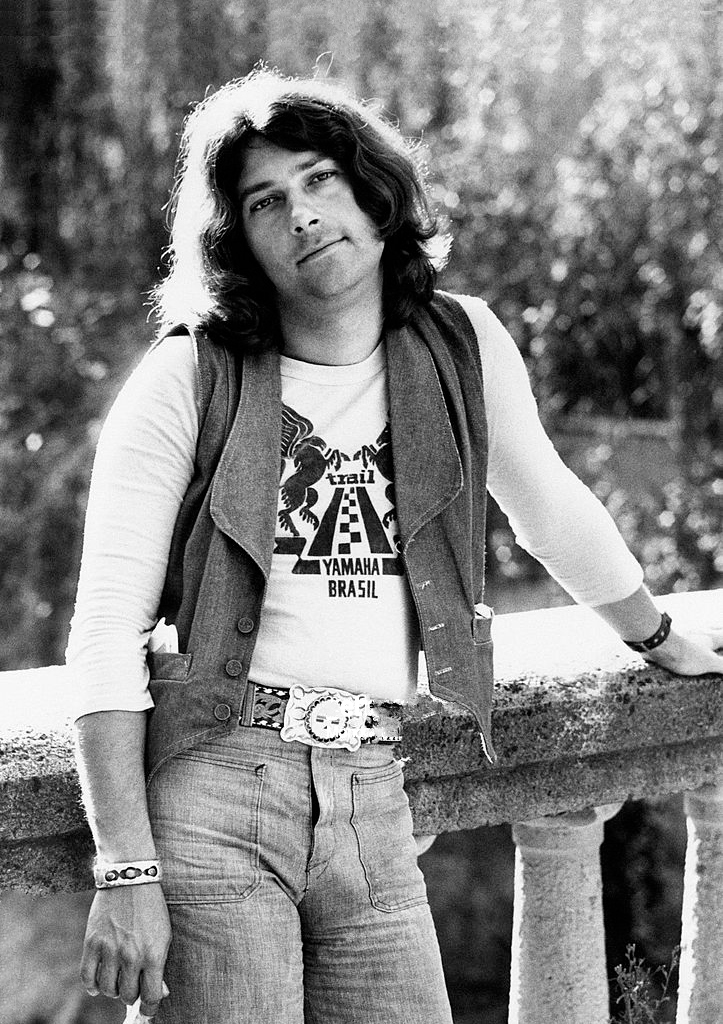
- Deodato in Venice, c. 1970

Background information
- Also known as: Deodato
- Born: Eumir Deodato de Almeida; 22 June 1942 (age 84); Rio de Janeiro, Brazil
- Genres: Jazz fusion; smooth jazz; crossover jazz; bossa nova; Latin jazz; disco
- Occupations: Musician; composer; arranger; record producer
- Instrument: Piano
- Years active: 1959–present
- Labels: CTI, MCA, Warner Bros.
- Spouse: Ruth Deodato (m. 1963, div. 1999) Mary Ellen Deodato (died 2021)

Eumir Deodato de Almeida (Brazilian Portuguese: [ẽwˈmiʁ deoˈdatu]; born 22 June 1942) is a Brazilian pianist, composer, arranger and record producer, primarily in jazz but who has been known for his eclectic melding of genres, such as pop, rock, disco, rhythm and blues, classical, Latin and bossa nova.

Deodato has arranged and produced more than 500 records for acts such as Frank Sinatra, Roberta Flack, Björk and Christophe. He also produced Kool & the Gang's hits "Celebration", "Ladies' Night" and "Too Hot".

Deodato was nominated for three Grammy Awards and won the Grammy Award for Best Pop Instrumental Performance in 1974 for "Also Sprach Zarathustra (2001)." The song peaked at number 2 on the weekly Billboard Hot 100 in March 1973. It reached number 3 in Canada and number 7 on the British charts.

== Biography ==
Deodato, born in Rio De Janeiro on 22 June 1942, began his musical life on accordion when he was 12 years old, and then piano two years later. He studied orchestration, conducting and arranging. He played bossa nova in bands with Paulo Silvino and Orlandivo, then formed his own band, which featured João Palma, Sergio Barroso, Ugo Marotta, Henri Ackselrud and guitarist Celso Brando, who was later replaced by Roberto Menescal in 1962. Eumir’s paternal grandfather was a marble craftsman from Custonaci, Sicily.

== Career ==
=== Recording career ===
Deodato often plays the Fender Rhodes electric piano. He became successful as a keyboard player in the 1970s. Since then, he has produced and arranged music on more than 500 albums for artists such as Kool & the Gang, Con Funk Shun, Björk, Christophe, Ithamara Koorax and k.d. lang. Guitarist John Tropea and flautist Hubert Laws appeared on his early albums.

Prelude, his first album in the U.S., was released in 1973. His track "Also Sprach Zarathustra (2001)" was a hit on the Billboard pop chart. This album was in a crossover music style that attracted a large audience and was produced by Creed Taylor for his label CTI. The album sold 5 million copies worldwide and earned Deodato the 1974 Grammy Award for Best Pop Instrumental Performance for the track "Also Sprach Zarathustra (2001)" as well as a Grammy nomination for Best New Artist.

His second album, Deodato 2, reached number 19 on the Billboard album chart, and the single "Rhapsody in Blue" reached No. 41 on the Billboard Hot 100 in 1973. His interpretation of Pavane pour une infante défunte ("Pavane for a Dead Princess") by Maurice Ravel was used in the 1970s by an Australian television station as background music.

In 1978, he had an orchestral hit with "Whistle Bump" from the LP titled Love Island. The track promoted the widespread use of whistles in nightclubs at the time. However, his popularity in the discos was solidified when he released the 1979 single Night Cruiser from the album of the same name, which earned him a third Grammy nomination for Best R&B Instrumental Performance. Deodato continued recording through the 1980s. In 1985, he had two hits, "S.O.S., Fire in the Sky" and "Are You for Real", on Billboard magazine's top 20 dance chart.

In 1998, Deodato invited his old friend and fellow Brazilian jazz impresario Arnaldo DeSouteiro to co-produce with him the first official CD reissues of all his albums from the 1960s, in a total of nine releases. Among them, Inútil Paisagem (reissued by JSR in co-production with Universal Music), Idéias, and all the albums from the Os Catedráticos series that were digitally remixed and remastered by audio engineer Rodrigo de Castro Lopes under the direct supervision of both Deodato and DeSouteiro.

He recorded Live in Rio in 2007. In 2009, Prelude was reissued for the first time in Asia on SACD and SHM-CD formats under the supervision of Arnaldo DeSouteiro. In 2011, he released the album The Crossing, which he produced with Lino Nicolosi and Pino Nicolosi at Nicolosi Productions, with guest vocalist Al Jarreau. In 2010 he played the rhodes piano in the album Oasis produced and performed by Marita Pauli. In 2018 he arranged and conducted the strings orchestra in the album The First released by Riccardo Dalli Cardillo.

=== Arranging and producing ===
Since the 1960s, Deodato has been in demand as a producer and arranger. He has worked on more than 500 albums, and 15 have reached platinum status as defined by the RIAA.

In the early 1960s, he worked as a freelance arranger for Odeon Records. He wrote arrangements for Wilson Simonal, Marcos Valle, Leny Andrade, Pery Ribeiro, Tito Madi and for his own debut album, Inútil Paisagem (1964), which was dedicated to the work of Antônio Carlos Jobim and recorded in Rio when Deodato was 22. Jobim praised him in the album's liner notes. Deodato played piano with guitarists Oscar Castro-Neves and Roberto Menescal, drummer Juquinha and an all-star cast including Copinha, J.T. Meirelles, Cipó, Paulo Moura. He has been credited for helping to start the career of Milton Nascimento; Deodato was part of a committee tasked with choosing songs for the Festival Internacional da Canção and chose three by Nascimento.

He moved to New York City in 1967 to work with guitarist Luiz Bonfá, with whom he recorded seven albums and countless jingles. Bonfá also introduced him to vocalist Astrud Gilberto and record producer Creed Taylor, when they were reunited on the making of Astrud's "Beach Samba" album for Verve Records. Later on, Creed Taylor hired him to write arrangements for musicians at CTI Records who included Wes Montgomery, Antônio Carlos Jobim, Milton Nascimento, Walter Wanderley, Stanley Turrentine, Paul Desmond and the CTI All Stars. Deodato also recorded with Frank Sinatra, (1969), João Donato (1970), Youg, Holt Unlimited (1973), Aretha Franklin (1973), and recorded three albums with Roberta Flack from 1971 to 1973.

He had other collaborations, including producing four million-selling albums for Kool and the Gang from 1979 to 1982, the first solo album by Kevin Rowland of Dexys Midnight Runners in 1988, three albums for singer Ithamara Koorax, as well as records by Chuck Mangione, Larry Graham, Tania Maria, Eliane Elias, Pretty Poison, One Way, Con Funk Shun, Brenda K. Starr, Kleeer, Gwen Guthrie and kd Lang. Deodato also developed a close collaboration with Icelandic singer Björk from 1996 to 1998, arranging her albums Post, Telegram and Homogenic as well as conducting the orchestra in many concerts for her both in Brazil and in the USA. For Deodato's Love Island, he and Maurice White co-wrote the instrumental "Tahiti Hut", which (with lyrics added to it) was later recorded by the band Switch with guest vocals by Jermaine Jackson.

Deodato wrote orchestral arrangements for the films The Gentle Rain (with original soundtrack by Luiz Bonfá in 1965), and The Adventurers (with soundtrack by Antonio Carlos Jobim and additional score by Deodato in 1969), as well as the original soundtracks for Target Risk, The Black Pearl (1977), The Onion Field (1979), Beat Street (1980), White Nights (1985, resuming his collaboration with Roberta Flack), and Bossa Nova (2000), among many others. He also produced and arranged for the movies Body Rock and Ghostbusters II. In 2025, Deodato released Meridiano with Carlos Pingarilho, and Spirit of Summer with Ithamara Koorax.

== Personal life ==
Eumir Deodato was married to Ruth Deodato from 1963 to 1999. Their daughter Kennya Deodato (b. 1968) is married to actor Stephen Baldwin. Their granddaughter Hailey Bieber is married to Canadian singer Justin Bieber.

== Discography ==
=== Albums ===
Year	Album	Peak chart positions					Label
Year	Album	US Pop	US R&B	US Jazz	AUS	CAN	Label
1964	Inútil Paisagem	―	―	―	―	―	Forma
1964	Ideias...	―	―	―	―	―	Odeon
1964	Samba Nova Concepção	―	―	―	―	―	Equipe
1965	Bossa Nova for Swinging Lovers	―	―	―	―	―	London Globe
1965	The Gentle Rain	―	―	―	―	―	Mercury
1972	Percepção	―	―	―	―	―	London
1973	Prelude	3	―	1	17	6	CTI
1973	Deodato 2	19	16	1	37	24	CTI
1973	DonatoDeodato (with João Donato)	―	―	35	―	―	Muse
1973	Os Catedráticos 73	―	―	―	―	―	Equipe
1974	In Concert (with Airto Moreira)	114	―	29	―	―	CTI
1974	Whirlwinds	63	28	7	85	54	MCA
1974	Artistry	102	―	20	―	―	MCA
1975	First Cuckoo	110	15	11	―	―	MCA
1975	Love, Strings and Jobim	―	―	―	―	―	Warner Bros.
1976	Very Together	86	―	13	―	―	MCA
1978	Love Island	98	―	9	―	100	Warner Bros.
1979	Knights of Fantasy	―	―	7	―	―	Warner Bros.
1980	Night Cruiser	186	53	7	―	―	Warner Bros.
1982	Happy Hour	―	―	30	―	―	Warner Bros.
1984	Motion	―	―	―	―	―	Warner Bros.
1989	In Concert [reissue with bonus tracks]	―	―	―	―	―	CBS
1989	Somewhere Out There	―	―	―	―	―	Atlantic
2009	Live in Rio	―	―	―	―	―	DRG Brazil
2010	The Crossing	―	―	―	―	―	Expansion
"—" denotes releases that did not chart or were not released in that territory.

=== As sideman ===
With Luiz Bonfá

- The Bonfa Magic (Milestone, 1993)
- Jacaranda (Ranwood, 1973; reissued JSR, 1998)
- Bonfá (Dot, 1969)
- Black Orpheus Impressions (Dot, 1968; reissued Sony, 2000)
- Steve & Eydie, Bonfa & Brazil (Columbia, 1968)
- Luiz Bonfá Plays Great Songs (Dot, 1967)
- Luiz Bonfá (Dot, 1967)
- The Gentle Rain - Original Soundtrack (Mercury, 1966)

With Astrud Gilberto

- Gilberto with Turrentine (CTI, 1971)
- Now (Perception, 1972)
- Windy (Verve, 1968)

With Antônio Carlos Jobim

- The Adventurers - Original Soundtrack (Paramount, 1969)
- Stone Flower (CTI, 1970)
- Tide (A&M/CTI, 1970)
- Antonio Carlos Jobim's Finest Hour (Verve, 2000)

With Kool & the Gang

- Ladies' Night (De-Lite, 1979)
- Celebration (De-Lite, 1980)
- Something Special (De-Lite, 1981)
- As One (De-Lite, 1982)

With Ithamara Koorax

- Ithamara Koorax Sings the Luiz Bonfa Songbook (Paddle Wheel, 1996)
- Exclusively For My Friends (BCE, 1999)
- Serenade in Blue (Milestone, 2000)
- Spirit Of Summer (JSR, 2025)

With Roberto Menescal

- A Nova Bossa Nova (Elenco, 1965)
- The Boy from Ipanema Beach (Kapp, 1965)
- Bossa Nova (Odeon, 1965)
- A Bossa Nova De Roberto Menescal (Elenco, 1964)

With Milton Nascimento

- Courage (A&M/CTI, 1969)
- Clube Da Esquina (EMI, 1972)
- Pietá (Warner, 2002)

With Frank Sinatra

- Sinatra & Company (Reprise, 1971) (side one arrangements)

With Brenda K. Starr

- Brenda K. Starr (MCA, 1987)
- By Heart (Epic, 1991)

With Stanley Turrentine

- Salt Song (CTI, 1971)
- The Baddest Turrentine (CTI, 1973)
- The Sugar Man (CTI, 1975)

With Marcos Valle

- Samba Demais (Odeon, 1964)
- O Compositor E O Cantor (Odeon, 1965)
- Viola Enluarada (Odeon, 1968)
- Braziliance! (Warner Bros., 1966)
- Samba '68 (Verve, 1968)
- Tempo da Gente (Arca Som, 1986)

With others

- Anthony and the Camp, Suspense (Warner Bros., 1988)
- Charles Aznavour, Toujours (EMI, 2011)
- Camp Lo, Uptown Saturday Night (Profile, 1997)
- Tony Cicco, ...E Mo' Parlamm'e Musica (RCA 1987)
- Billy Cobham, Drum 'n' Voice Vol. 4 (Nicolosi, 2016)
- Dazz Band, Rock the Room (RCA Victor, 1988)
- Milton Delugg, Accordion My Way-Ole! (RCA Victor, 1967)
- Paul Desmond, Summertime (A&M, 1968)
- Eliane Elias, So Far So Close (Blue Note, 1989)
- Roberta Flack, Killing Me Softly (Atlantic, 1973)
- Roberta Flack, Quiet Fire (Atlantic, 1972)
- Roberta Flack, Chapter Two (Atlantic, 1971)
- Aretha Franklin, Let Me in Your Life (Atlantic, 1974)
- Michael Franks, Burchfield Nines (Warner, 1978)
- Tania Maria, Made in New York (Manhattan, 1984)
- Fun Lovin' Criminals, Come Find Yourself (EMI, 1996)
- Fun Lovin' Criminals, The Grave and the Constant EP (Chrysalis, 1996)
- Larry Graham, Fired Up (Warner Bros., 1998)
- Kleeer, Seeekret (Atlantic, 1985)
- Kleiton & Kledir, Dois (Som Livre, 1996)
- Tito Madi, Balanco Zona Sul E Outros Sucessos (Odeon, 1966)
- Chuck Mangione, Disguise (Columbia, 1984)
- Maysa, Maysa (Elenco, 1964)
- Lisa Ono, Pretty World Suite! (Supuesto! 2000)
- Jorge Pescara, Grooves in the Temple (2005)
- Pretty Poison, Catch Me I'm Falling (Virgin, 1988)
- Quarteto em Cy, Quarteto em Cy (Forma, 1964)
- Ranieri, Meditazione (CGD, 1976)
- Dom Um Romão, Lake of Perseverance (JSR/Irma, 2001)
- JSR All-Stars, Friends From Brazil 2001 (JSR/Irma, 2001)
- Carlos Pingarilho, Histórias E Sonhos (JSR, 2002)
- Carlos Pingarilho, Meridiano (JSR, 2025)
- Brazil All Stars, Rio Strut (JSR, 2002)
- Kevin Rowland, The Wanderer (Mercury, 1988)
- Marisa Monte, Infinito Particular (EMI, 2006)
- Carlinhos Brown, Omelete Man (EMI, 1998)
- Wanda Sá, Wanda Vagamente (RGE, 1964)
- Steve and Eydie, Steve & Eydie, Bonfa & Brazil (CBS/Sony, 1987)
- Riccardo Dalli Cardillo, The First (DCP, 2018)

=== Singles ===
Year	Single (A-side / B-side)	Peak chart positions								
Year	Single (A-side / B-side)	US Pop	US R&B	US Dance	US AC	AUS	UK	CAN Pop	CAN AC	CAN Dance
1973	"Also Sprach Zarathustra (2001)" / "Spirit of Summer"	2	―	―	5	4	7	3	22	―
1973	"Rhapsody in Blue" / "Super Strut"	41	42	―	―	42	—	48	13	―
1974	"Do It Again" (live) / "Branches" (live) (B-side is by Airto)	―	―	―	―	―	―	―	―	―
1974	"Moonlight Serenade" / "Havana Strut"	―	―	―	―	83	—	―	5	―
1975	"Caravan" / "Watusi Strut"	―	―	3	―	―	―	―	―	―
1976	"Theme from Peter Gunn" / "Amani"	84	96	20	―	―	―	―	―	―
1978	"Pina Colada" / "Love Island"	―	―	―	―	―	―	―	―	―
1978	"Whistle Bump" / "Love Island"	―	81	8	―	―	―	―	―	1
1979	"Shazam" / "Space Dust"	―	―	71	―	―	―	―	―	―
1980	"Night Cruiser" / "Groovation"	―	―	23	―	―	―	―	―	―
1980	"East Side Strut" / "Uncle Funk"	―	―	―	―	―	―	―	―	―
1982	"Keep It in the Family" / "Keep on Movin'"	―	―	41	―	―	―	―	―	―
1982	"Happy Hour" / "Sweet Magic"	70	70	44	―	―	―	―	―	―
1984	"S.O.S. Fire in the Sky" / "East Side Strut"	―	―	6	―	77	―	―	―	―
1984	"Are You for Real" / "Motion"	―	―	17	―	―	―	―	―	―
1989	"Everybody Wants My Girl" (featuring Tom Hammer)	―	―	―	―	―	―	―	―	―
2010	"Double Face" (feat. Al Jarreau) (UK only release)	―	―	―	―	―	―	―	―	―
"—" denotes releases that did not chart or were not released in that territory.
