= Katya Chamma (album) =

Studio album by Katya Chamma
- Released: June 30, 2003
- Genres: Pop rock, blues, MPB
- Length: 44:05
- Label: Independent record label
- Producer: Katya Chamma

Katya Chamma is the self-titled first studio album by Brazilian singer-songwriter Katya Chamma. It was released in 2003 by Independent record label. Its music incorporates a mix of Pop rock, Blues and Música popular brasileira. The album features twelve composition (ten original compositions by Katya Chamma).

The album received generally positive reviews from music critics. The Jornal das Gravadoras (Brazilian Periodical of the Recorders) pointed Katya Chamma as one of the illustrious representative greaters of Brazilian independent music and Example of independent art (edition 106).

== Track listing ==
No.	Title	Writer(s)	Producer(s)	Length
1.	"Verdades & Mentiras"	Katya Chamma	Katya Chamma	3:51
2.	"Zarabatana"	Katya Chamma	Katya Chamma	3:55
3.	"Olhos de Neon"	Katya Chamma	Katya Chamma	4:12
4.	"Corsário"	Katya Chamma	Katya Chamma	3:54
5.	"Paixão"	Kledir Ramil	Katya Chamma	4:38
6.	"Cinemascope"	Katya Chamma	Katya Chamma	4:17
7.	"Eu Canto o Meu Blues"	Roberto Menescal, Oswaldo Montenegro	Katya Chamma	3:56
8.	"Indomável"	Katya Chamma	Katya Chamma	4:18
9.	"Máscara de Luz"	Katya Chamma	Katya Chamma	3:16
10.	"Poeira de Vidro"	Katya Chamma	Katya Chamma	3:40
11.	"Chinatown"	Katya Chamma	Katya Chamma	3:40
12.	"Um Rock"	Katya Chamma	Katya Chamma	3:08

== Other sources ==
- Amaral, Euclides (2010). Alguns Aspectos Da MPB. Rio de Janeiro: Esteio Editora. Biblioteca Nacional/Registro: 433.708.
