= Love Island (album) =

Studio album by Deodato
- Released: 1978
- Studios: Capitol (Hollywood); Hollywood Sound Recorders (Los Angeles); Warner Bros. (Burbank, California); House Of Music (West Orange, New Jersey); Mediasound (New York)
- Genres: Jazz; jazz-funk; jazz fusion
- Label: Warner Bros.
- Producers: Eumir Deodato; Tommy LiPuma

Deodato chronology
2001 (1977)	Love Island (1978)	Meditazioni Trumpet in Classic (1978)

Professional ratings
Review scores
Source	Rating
AllMusic	2.5/5 stars

Love Island is a studio album by Brazilian keyboardist Eumir Deodato, released in 1978 on Warner Bros. Records. The album reached No. 9 on the Billboard Jazz Albums chart, but just No. 100 on the Canadian charts. "Whistle Bump" charted No. 1 on the Canadian 'Dance/Urban' charts, June 17, 1978.

== Overview ==
"Love Island" combines Deodato's jazz-fusion style with funk and disco, with the song titles "Area Code 808", "Tahiti Hut", "San Juan Sunset", "Love Island" and "Pina Colada" drawing on island and tropical imagery. Amy Hanson of AllMusic described the album as a mixture of "fusion and funky disco".

The Album was produced by Deodato and Tommy LiPuma, with arrangements and conducting by Deodato. Musicians include George Benson, Larry Carlton, Harvey Mason, Al McKay, Randy Brecker and Victor Feldman. "Tahiti Hut" was co-written by Deodato and Maurice White of Earth, Wind & Fire, and features White's bandmates Verdine White, Fred White and Philip Bailey.

== Critical reception ==
Ernie Santosuosso noted "Love Island" and "Tahiti Hut" as the best tracks lauding "George Benson's tumbling-noted guitar cameo" and the"intriguing bass figures played by Pops Popwell" as "frilled by Deodato's vocalanger (voice) effects" on "Love Island", the title track, and "Deodato's subdued vocalise" and "simple melodic statement by trombonists Sam Burtis and Wayne Andre" on "Tahiti Hut", the latter, calling the others "a rather anonymous lot".

A review in the Great Yarmouth Mercury called Deodato "funky" and commended his "consistently fine music since his success with the "Space Odyssey" theme" saying that he added "meaty latin-tinged arrangements'" to tunes including Billy Strayhorn's Ellington classic "Take the "A" Train"

Jim Berry of The Charlotte Post called Deodato's style "still imaginative and unique" and his music "easy going and mellow" saying there wasn't a bad song on the album while highlighting "Tahiti Hut," "Chariot of the Gods" and "Area Code 808" as among the better ones.

== Track listing ==
Adapted from album's text.

No.	Title	Writer(s)	Length
1.	"Area Code 808"	Deodato, George Parrish, Jr.	6:45
2.	"Whistle Bump"	Deodato	4:32
3.	"Tahiti Hut"	Deodato, Maurice White	4:27
4.	"San Juan Sunset"	Deodato	4:15
5.	"Love Island"	Deodato	6:40
6.	"Chariot of the Gods"	Don Juan Mancha, Edwin Starr	3:09
7.	"Pina Colada"	Deodato	5:55
8.	"Take The "A" Train"	Billy Strayhorn	3:48
