= Tony Humphries (musician) =

American electronic musician and DJ (born 1957)

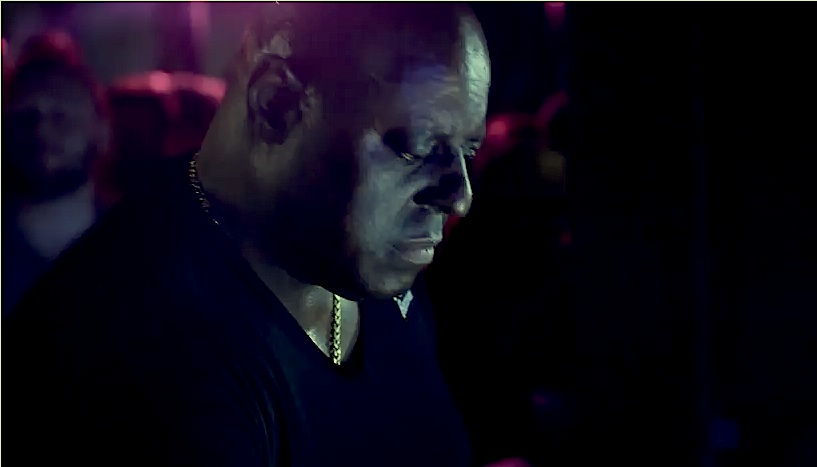

Background information
- Born: November 3, 1957 (age 68); Brooklyn, New York, U.S.
- Origin: New York City
- Genre: House
- Occupations: DJ, producer
- Years active: 1981–present
- Labels: Ministry of Sound; Strictly Rhythm; Nervous Records; Fabric; Tony Records; Yellorange Records
- Website: tonyhumphries.com

Tony Humphries (born November 3, 1957) is an American electronic musician and DJ. He was one of the earliest proponents of house music and has been instrumental in spreading the genre on both sides of the Atlantic.

Humphries' work encompasses studio production and remixes, radio slots on WRKS 98.7 Kiss FM and Hot 97, and DJ residencies at clubs including Club Zanzibar (Newark, New Jersey) and Ministry of Sound in London, UK.

== Early life ==
Born in Brooklyn, Tony Humphries began collecting records at age ten. Humphries' passion for music was encouraged from a very early age. His father, Rene, had emigrated from Colombia some years earlier, before going on to lead the New York Combo. Rene "El Grande Combo" Humphries, as he was known, performed alongside salsa performers including Tito Puente.

== The Zanzibar years ==
Humphries began DJing at college and got his first professional gig in 1981 at the then-new New York station 98.7 Kiss-FM following a chance encounter with Shep Pettibone. His big break was in 1982, when he was asked by Shep Pettibone to fill in for a mix show on WRKS 98.7 Kiss-FM in New York. Soon afterward, he was a regular contributor of the station's mastermixes—extended and remixed versions of popular songs—a process that had been pioneered on the station earlier by Pettibone. During most of the 1980s until 1994, Humphries had a mix show that aired on Kiss-FM every Friday and Saturday night.

In 1982, Humphries got a residency at the Club Zanzibar, in Newark, New Jersey, home of the so-called Jersey Sound.

Humphries and Club Zanzibar, alongside the Paradise Garage and its resident DJ Larry Levan, are considered to be the main driving forces behind the creation of garage house music.

== Europe ==
By the late 1980s, bootleg tapes of Humphries's Kiss-FM radio shows had begun to make their way across the Atlantic. Alex Patterson from ambient house group The Orb was one such early disciple; "hearing proper DJs like Tony Humphries, that's what really got me into house music."

Humphries's earliest UK appearances were at club nights in London, such as Danny Rampling's Shoom and Norman Jay's High On Hope at Dingwalls.

In the 1990s, as dance music grew in popularity in the UK and throughout Europe, Humphries was given a residency at the London superclub Ministry of Sound. He also recorded for the Ministry of Sound label and launched the Ministry of Sound Sessions series.

Humphries plays regularly at Ibiza clubs such as Pacha. He also appears regularly on Kings of House tours alongside David Morales and "Little" Louie Vega.

== Studio work ==
Humphries has a large back catalogue of studio production work; remixes spanning a broad number of styles from artists make up the bulk of this output.

Humphries has produced many DJ mixes and compilations. These include his work for Ministry of Sound, London's Fabric, Strictly Rhythm, DMC, and, returning to his roots, his Zanzibar Classics compilations. A notable compilation titled Tony Humphries Choice: A Collection Of Club Zanzibar Classics was released on Azuli Records in 2003, and includes classics such as "Take Me Home" by Cher and "Are You For Real" by Deodato featuring Camille.

=== Selected mix compilations ===
- 1993 Ministry Of Sound (The Sessions Vol. One)
- 1993 Strictly Rhythm Mix
- 1994 Strictly Tribal
- 1994 The Tony Humphries Strictly Rhythm Mix Vol. 2
- 1995 This is the Sound of Tribal United Kingdom Vol 2
- 1996 King Street Sounds - Mix the Vibe
- 1996 Club Nervous - First Five Years of House Classics
- 1999 Basement Boys present Melting Pot
- 2001 "Little" Louie Vega*, Tony Humphries & Tedd Patterson - Sessions Twelve (The Magic Sessions)
- 2002 Fabric 04
- 2002 United DJs of America - Vol. 18
- 2003 Azuli presents Tony Humphries - Choice - A Collection of Club Zanzibar Classics
- 2005 Southport Weekender Vol. 4
- 2008 Moments in House - Ministry Of Sound
- 2013 Quintessentials
- 2015 Mangiami - La Compilation
- 2015 West End Master Mix 2015

=== Selected productions and remixes ===
- 1982 Indeep - "Last Night a DJ Saved My Life" (Sound of New York/Becket)
- 1982 Tyrone Brunson - "The Smurf" (PIP/CBS)
- 1983 Mtume - "Juicy Fruit" (Epic/CBS)
- 1983 Fresh Band - "Come Back Lover" (Are N' Be)
- 1983 Visual - "The Music's Got Me" (Prelude)
- 1984 Joubert Singers - "Stand on the Word" (Next Plateau)
- 1989 Queen Latifah - "Come Into My House" (Tommy Boy/Warner Bros.)
- 1989 Donna Summer - "Breakaway" (Atlantic)
- 1989 Cultural Vibe - "Ma Foom Bey" (Easy Street)
- 1989 Longsy D. - "This Is Ska" (Warlock)
- 1989 Chaka Khan - "I Know You I Live You" (Warner Bros.)
- 1989 Adeva - "Warning" (Cooltempo/Chrysalis/EMI)
- 1989 Ultra Naté - "It's Over Now" (Warner Bros.)
- 1990 Lil' Louis - "Nyce and Slo" (Epic/CBS)
- 1990 The O'Jays - "Don't Let Me Down" (EMI)
- 1990 The Beloved - "The Sun Rising" (Atlantic)
- 1990 Deee-Lite - "Power of Love" (Elektra)
- 1991 Desiya - "Comin' on Strong" (Mute/Elektra)
- 1992 Alison Limerick - "Make It on My Own" (Arista/BMG)
- 1992 Soul II Soul - "Joy" (Virgin/EMI)
- 1993 Romanthony - "Falling from Grace" (Azuli)
- 1997 Janet Jackson - "Together Again" (Virgin/EMI)
- 2007 Billie Holiday - "But Beautiful" (Legacy/Columbia/SME)
- 2008 Nina Simone - Turn Me On" (Legacy/RCA/SME)
- 2013 Frankie Knuckles pres. Inaya Day - "Let's Stay Home" (Nocturnal Groove)
- 2013 Lynn Lockamy - "Hostile Takeover" (Tony Records)
- 2014 Nina Lares - "You and I" (Moulton Music)

== Labels ==
Tony Humphries formed his first record label, Yellorange, in 1998. It was renamed Tony Records in 2006. He left the label in 2016, and TR Records was founded in its place.

== Influence ==
Todd Terry cites Tony Humphries and Larry Levan as big influences.

MK, whose remix of "Push the Feeling On" by the Nightcrawlers reached number 3 in the UK singles chart in 1995, also cites Humphries as a major influence. "It helped my production hearing the New York DJs, hearing Tony Humphries, Frankie Knuckles, Masters At Work. I found my missing link."
