= Madhouse Records =

Madhouse Records may refer to:

- Madhouse Records (British record label)
- Madhouse Records (Jamaican record label)
