= New Jersey sound =

1980s variant of house music

- Other names: Jersey sound
- Stylistic origins: Disco; house; garage house; deep house; soul; gospel
- Cultural origins: Early 1980s; Newark, New Jersey
- Typical instruments: Turntable; drum machine; sampler; sequencer; digital audio workstation

The New Jersey sound or Jersey sound is a genre of house music originating in Newark, New Jersey, during the early 1980s. It is a type of deep and garage house with an emphasis on soulful vocals influenced by Newark's gospel legacy.

== History ==
The New Jersey sound originated in the 1980s. Places like Club Zanzibar in Newark, New Jersey, where DJ Tony Humphries began his residency in 1982, helped "spawn the sometimes raw but always soulful, gospel-infused subgenre" of deep house music known as the Jersey sound. Besides the term "New Jersey house", there are alternative names for the genre: "In the UK, for fairly unfathomable reasons, it became known as garage music (named after the Paradise Garage in New York), while in NJ itself they simply called it club (or perhaps more pertinently, the Jersey sound," Mix Mag reported in July 2020. Newark female singers remixed by house music DJ Larry Levan included Gwen Guthrie ("Ain't Nothin' Goin On But The Rent") and Taana Gardner ("Heartbeat").

In 1992, Union County's Aly-Us released its deep-house hit "Follow Me."

Abigail Adams's house-music record label and store Movin’ Records in Newark's neighbor East Orange was another contributor to the Jersey Sound.

The Jersey club scene also gave rise to the ball culture scene in Newark hotels and nightclubs. "Queen of House" Crystal Waters and other house luminaries performed on the Newark scene. DJ Kerri Chandler, another Zanzibar DJ, was another pioneer of the "Jersey sound" variety of house music. Jersey artists like Jomanda, with the crossover hit "Got a Love for You," found success in the early 1990s house-music scene.

Some have said that "when New York went to hip hop [during this period], Jersey stayed with the club. Because of Zanzibar."

== Festivals ==
Annual summer events like the Roselle House Music Festival in Warinanco Park, the Trenton House Music Festival, the Weequahic Park House Music Festival, the Plainfield House Music Festival in Cedar Brook Park and the Lincoln Park Music Festival attract families and house music enthusiasts, also known as house heads, dedicated to the classic 1980s Jersey sound.

== See also ==
- Latin freestyle, a genre of dance music popular in the late 1980s and early 1990s in the New Jersey area
