= New York House =

New York House may refer to:

- New York House, California, a gold-rush town
- New York State Assembly, or New York House of Representatives
- Garage house, a music style
