= Come Baby Come =

1993 single by K7

Single by K7

from the album Swing Batta Swing
- B-side: "I'll Make You Feel Good"
- Released: July 27, 1993
- Genre: Hip hop
- Length: 3:57
- Label: Tommy Boy
- Songwriter: K7
- Producer: Joey Gardner

K7 singles chronology
"Come Baby Come" (1993)	"Zunga Zeng" (1993)

Music video
- "Come Baby Come" on YouTube

"Come Baby Come" is a song by American rapper K7 featuring vocals by Camille, released by Tommy Boy Records as the first single from the rapper's debut album, Swing Batta Swing (1993). The song peaked at numbers 18 and 15 on the US Billboard Hot 100 and Cash Box Top 100 charts, respectively, as well as number three on the UK Singles Chart. It was produced by Joey Gardner and received positive reviews from music critics. The song was also certified gold by the Recording Industry Association of America (RIAA) on November 17, 1993. The accompanying music video was directed by Hype Williams and filmed in Jersey City, New Jersey.

== Critical reception ==
In his review of Swing Batta Swing, AllMusic editor Adam Greenberg noted that it "involve a good deal of those call and response patterns, but at a higher speed than most of the tracks, very danceworthy for a club". Larry Flick from Billboard magazine wrote, "Do not even try to sit out this thick'n'chewy hip-hop throwdown ... it is next to impossible." He felt the "infectious groove" is enhanced by "an anthemic, air-punching chorus that you will be chanting for days." He also added, "With his insanely infectious first solo single, former TKA member K7 is well on the way to a smokin' new career. The track is a rapid series of brain-embedding and bodyinvading hooks and refrains, laid over a butt-shagging hip-hop beat. Unbelievably catchy stuff." A reviewer from Music & Media stated, "The "vice versa rap" method-one guy talks and the rest counters collectively–is used in an ultra catchy way."

John Kilgo from The Network Forty wrote that here, "Reggae-inspired toasting dropped over a rhythmic hip-hop beat gospelish female vocals, paired with cadenced male chantings, defy simple categorization. Props to their self-interpretation of Paula Abdul's 'Straight Up' done acapella". Danny Frost from NME felt it has "a certain clueless, adolescent charm". Another NME editor, Mark Sutherland, praised it as a "room-wobbling monster hit". Mark Frith from Smash Hits viewed it as a "raw" and "exciting" track. Danyel Smith from Spin stated, "Hip hop mixed with dance mixed with a black-frat-style chorus, the song is as contagious as poison ivy." James Hunter from Vibe described it as a "serious goof", noting that it "unwinds like dancehall, jerks and cuts like hip hop, and shouts its seductions with the gutbucket abandon of Joe Tex's 'I Gotcha'. The phone rings just as K7 gets home to his sweetie ("Hello? Hello?"), hilariously interrupting the mood. But this record is really about his adventures after he slams the bedroom door."

== Music video ==
A music video was produced to promote the single, directed by American music video director Hype Williams. It features the band riding around Jersey City, New Jersey in a 1955 Plymouth Belvedere convertible. Support from US music video channel The Box on the video was instrumental in breaking K7. Danyel Smith from Spin commented on the video, "K7's 'Come Baby Come' single has been pushed to pop hit status with major assistance from its video. Built on slow, close-up shots of bouncing breasts and curvaceous ass cheeks, the clip is like 2 Live Crew on Valium." Another Spin editor, Charles Aaron, wrote, "Irresistible ragga hook, but too fixated on boobs and male-bonding. Cut-offs at the softball game and tattoos at the beach rate highly." In Europe, MTV Europe put "Come Baby Come" on active rotation and German music television channel VIVA B-listed it in April 1994.

== Impact and legacy ==
In 2010, Pitchfork included "Come Baby Come" in their list of "Ten Actually Good 90s Jock Jams". In 2017, BuzzFeed ranked it number 61 in their list of "The 101 Greatest Dance Songs of the '90s".

== Usage in media ==
"Come Baby Come" appears on the Little Fires Everywhere episode, "The Spider Web" and the 2006 film Stick it. In 2007, German rapper B-Tight sampled the song in “Ich bins” (“It’s me”). The song is also sampled in the song "BaDinga!" by TWRK which was a popular dance hit in 2015.

The song is also played at the climax of the Black Mirror episode "Loch Henry".

It was also used in the Movie "Suicide Squad" elevator fight Scene, featuring Margot Robbie as Harley Quinn.

== Track listings ==
- CD maxi-single, US (1993)
1. "Come Baby Come" (radio edit) – 3:56
2. "I'll Make You Feel Good" (radio edit) – 4:14
3. "Come Baby Come" (extended version) – 5:13
4. "I'll Make You Feel Good" (extended version) – 4:54
5. "Come Baby Come" (instrumental) – 3:57
6. "Come Baby Come" (a cappella) – 3:57
7. "I'll Make You Feel Good" (a cappella) – 4:51
- 12-inch single, US (1993)

A1. "Come Baby Come" (radio edit) – 3:56
A2. "Come Baby Come" (extended version) – 5:13
A3. "Come Baby Come" (instrumental) – 3:57
A4. "Come Baby Come" (acapella) – 3:57
B1. "I'll Make You Feel Good" (radio edit) – 4:14
B2. "I'll Make You Feel Good" (extended version) – 4:54
B3. "I'll Make You Feel Good" (acapella) – 4:51

- 7-inch single, UK (1993)

A. "Come Baby Come" (radio edit)
B. "I'll Make You Feel Good" (radio edit)

- CD single, UK (1993)
1. "Come Baby Come" – 4:00
2. "Come Baby Come" (Dance Baby Dance) – 4:22
3. "I'll Make You Feel Good" (extended version) – 4:56
4. "Come Baby Come" (Skin Up dub) – 6:34
- Cassette single, UK (1993)

A1. "Come Baby Come" (radio edit)
A2. "I'll Make You Feel Good" (radio edit)
B1. "Come Baby Come" (radio edit)
B2. "I'll Make You Feel Good" (radio edit)

- 12-inch, Europe (1993)

A1. "Come Baby Come" (radio edit) – 3:56
A2. "Come Baby Come" (extended version) – 5:13
B1. "I'll Make You Feel Good" (extended version) – 4:54

== Charts ==
=== Weekly charts ===
Chart (1993–1994)	Peak position
Australia (ARIA)	68
Austria (Ö3 Austria Top 40)	22
Belgium (Ultratop 50 Flanders)	39
Canada Dance/Urban (RPM)	3
Europe (Eurochart Hot 100)	13
Europe (European Dance Radio)	15
Finland (IFPI)	13
Germany (GfK)	24
Iceland (Íslenski Listinn Topp 40)	5
Ireland (IRMA)	3
Netherlands (Dutch Top 40)	13
Netherlands (Single Top 100)	14
New Zealand (Recorded Music NZ)	14
Scottish Singles Sales (Official Charts)	43
Sweden (Sverigetopplistan)	27
Switzerland (Schweizer Hitparade)	28
UK Singles (Official Charts)	3
UK Airplay (Music Week)	13
UK Club Chart (Music Week)	46
US Billboard Hot 100	18
US Hot R&B Singles (Billboard)	42
US Hot Rap Singles (Billboard)	9
US Maxi-Singles Sales (Billboard)	5
US Top 40/Rhythm-Crossover (Billboard)	16
US Cash Box Top 100	15

=== Year-end charts ===
Chart (1993)	Position
US Maxi-Singles Sales (Billboard)	21

Chart (1994)	Position
Canada Dance/Urban (RPM)	27
Europe (Eurochart Hot 100)	62
Germany (Media Control)	97
Iceland (Íslenski Listinn Topp 40)	19
Netherlands (Dutch Top 40)	93
New Zealand (RIANZ)	45
UK Singles (OCC)	53
US Hot Rap Singles (Billboard)	45

== Certifications ==
Region	Certification	Certified units/sales
New Zealand (RMNZ)	Gold	5,000^{*}
United States (RIAA)	Gold	500,000^{^}
^{*} Sales figures based on certification alone.^{^} Shipments figures based on certification alone.

== Release history ==
Region	Date	Format(s)	Label(s)	Ref.
United States	July 27, 1993	—N/a	Tommy Boy	
Australia	October 4, 1993	CD; cassette	Tommy Boy	
United Kingdom	November 29, 1993	7-inch vinyl; 12-inch vinyl; CD; cassette	Big Life; Tommy Boy	
