= Club Zanzibar =

Dance club in Newark, New Jersey, US

Coordinates: 40.746762°N 74.170183°W

- Interactive map of Club Zanzibar
- Address: 430 Broad Street; Newark; United States
- Type: Dance club

Construction
- Opened: 1979

Club Zanzibar was a dance club that opened in 1979 at 430 Broad Street in Newark, New Jersey. Its presence in Downtown Newark was noted for its influence on house music and garage house genres and scene. Club Zanzibar, along with other gay and straight clubs in the era, was both a straight and Gay black and Latino nightlife destination.

== The Jersey Sound ==
DJ Tony Humphries began his residency at the club in 1982 and, along with others, helped "spawn the sometimes raw but always soulful, gospel-infused subgenre" of house music known as the Jersey sound. The club scene also gave rise to the ball culture scene in Newark hotels and nightclubs.

New Jersey artists like Jomanda found success on the house music scene.

Abigail Adams's house-music record label and store, Movin’ Records in adjacent East Orange, New Jersey was another contributor to the sound.

Well-known deep house DJ Kerri Chandler was also a resident DJ at the club. His girlfriend was brutally attacked and killed by another man outside the club in a horrific attack in the 1980s.

Some have said that "when New York went to rap [during this period], Jersey stayed with club. Because of Zanzibar."

The sound was exported to London during the era and eagerly devoured by house music enthusiasts across the pond.

The music video for K-YZE's "Stomp (Move Jump Jack Your Body)" was filmed at the Zanzibar in 1989.

== History ==
The club opened in 1979. The sound system was developed, designed, and installed by Richard Long of Richard Long & Associates (RLA). The club transitioned to hip-hop in the 1990s, rebranding as Brick City, and eventually closed.

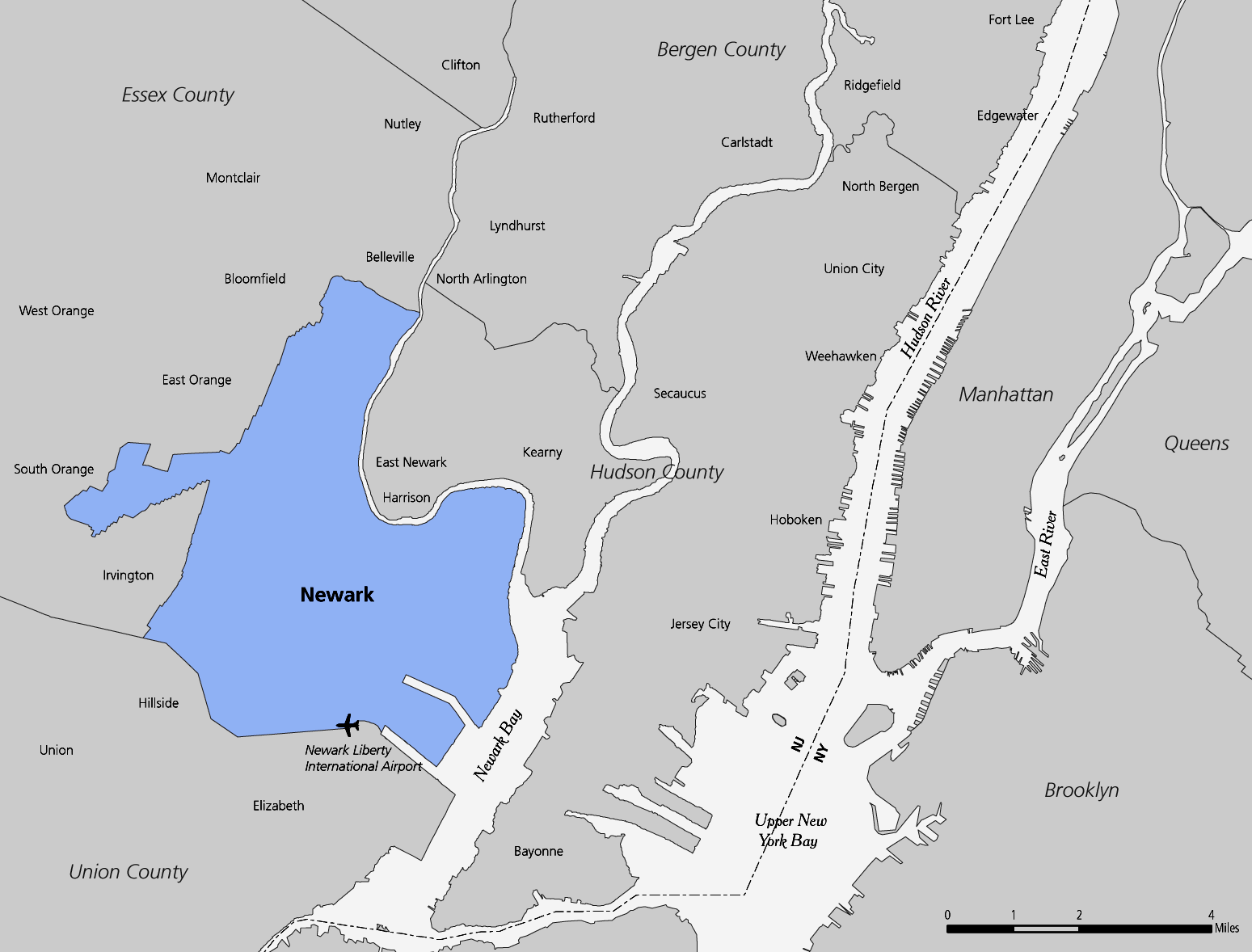
Newark area map

Sound system designer and club owner Craig "Shorty" Bernabeu also worked on the sound system.

In 1988, Paris Dupree held her famous Paris Is Burning ball at the club, namesake to the famous film.

== Legacy ==
Newark-area annual summer events like the Roselle House Music Festival in Warinanco Park, the Weequahic Park House Music Festival, and the Lincoln Park Music Festival serve as unofficial "Zans" reunions.

In 2025, the Black-owned listening bar Consigliere opened off Halsey Street, owned by two Newark attorneys, with an interior design aesthetic informed by the venue's legacy.

== Performers ==
Notable performers who have played "the Zanzibar" include:

- Michelle Ayers
- Larry Levan
- Jomanda
- Tony Humphries
- François Kevorkian
- Tee Scott
- David Morales
- Grace Jones
- Kool & the Gang
- Whitney Houston
- Patti LaBelle
- Fonda Rae
- Gloria Gaynor
- Luther Vandross
- Cheryl Lynn
- Vicki Sue Robinson
- Linda Clifford
- Crystal Waters
- Jocelyn Brown
- CeCe Rogers
- Millie Jackson
- Taylor Dayne
- Sharon Redd
- Kerri Chandler
- Loleatta Holloway
- Jackie Moore
- Thelma Houston
- Nona Hendryx
- Sugarhill Gang
- Indeep
- Gwen Guthrie
- Chaka Khan
- Sarah Dash
- Colonel Abrams
- Claudja Barry
- Sylvester
- Paris Dupree
- Bonnie Pointer
- The Weather Girls
- CeCe Peniston
- Shannon
- Black Box
- Queen Latifah
- Central Line
- Debbie Jacobs
- Ceybil Jefferies
- Blaze
- Ullanda McCullough
- Five Star
- Modern Romance
- Aly-Us
- Rockers Revenge

== Building ==
The Lincoln Motel, which housed Club Zanzibar, was torn down in 2007 as one contemporary developer called it a “ blemished, rat-infested drug-haven eyesore." It had degenerated into a notorious hotspot for crime, drug abuse, prostitution, murder and violence. Its owner, Miles Berger of the Berger Organization, was also the owner of a number of welfare hotels at the time throughout the city. "For a time, arrests were so common that a motel floor plan graced the wall of the public defender's office to assist lawyers juggling cases. Then-Mayor Cory Booker manned the bulldozer that began the building's demolition in 2007."

In the 1980s, Mr. Berger had turned its 200 rooms into a haven for welfare recipients, earning about $1,000 a month per person." Berger's Berger Organization has expressed interest in building a casino on the site.

== See also ==
- New Jersey house
- List of electronic dance music venues
