= Deodato 2 =

Studio album by Deodato
- Released: July 18, 1973
- Recorded: April 12 & May 16, 1973
- Studios: Van Gelder Studio, Englewood Cliffs, NJ
- Genres: Jazz fusion, jazz-funk
- Length: 32:35
- Label: CTI Records
- Producer: Creed Taylor

Deodato chronology
Prelude (1973)	Deodato 2 (1973)	Whirlwinds (1974)

Professional ratings
Review scores
Source	Rating
Allmusic	3.5/5.0 stars

Deodato 2 is a 1973 album by Brazilian keyboardist Eumir Deodato. It features session guitarist John Tropea on 4 tracks and bassist Stanley Clarke on one song, "Skyscrapers". His version of George Gershwin's "Rhapsody in Blue" was used in Pontiac commercials during the early-1970s. The song reached #48 in Canada in 1973.

The songs "Super Strut" and "Latin Flute" were featured on the soundtrack of the video game Grand Theft Auto Vice City. The track "Super Strut" was also covered by the acid jazz band The Apostles on their 1992 eponymous album.

== Track listing ==
=== Vinyl ===
==== Side 1 ====
1. "Nights in White Satin" (Justin Hayward) - 6:01
2. "Pavane for a Dead Princess" (Maurice Ravel) 4:08
3. "Skyscrapers" (Eumir Deodato) - 6:40

==== Side 2 ====
1. "Super Strut" (Eumir Deodato) - 8:58
2. "Rhapsody in Blue" (George Gershwin, arrangement and adaptation by Eumir Deodato) - 8:48

=== CD ===
The tracks were rearranged for the CD release. The two tracks on Side 2 were placed first then the tracks on Side 1 were placed after. The CD release also featured an extended version of Super Strut, an extended and re-mixed outro to Skyscrapers, as well as 3 bonus tracks.

1. "Super Strut" - 9:31
2. "Rhapsody in Blue" - 8:48
3. "Nights in White Satin" - 6:01
4. "Pavane for a Dead Princess" - 4:08
5. "Skyscrapers" - 7:01

==== Bonus tracks ====
1. "Latin Flute" (Eumir Deodato) - 4:49
2. "Venus" (Eumir Deodato) - 3:32
3. "Do It Again" (Walter Becker, Donald Fagen) - 5:31

"Tropea" (incomplete, not released on this album) was produced during the recording sessions of Deodato 2.

== Charts ==
Chart (1973)	Peak position
Australian (Kent Music Report)	37
Canada (RPM)	24

== Personnel ==
=== Band ===
- Eumir Deodato: Keyboards, Acoustic and Electric Piano
- John Tropea: Guitars
- John Giulino, Stanley Clarke: Bass
- Alvin Brehm, Russell Savakus: Arco Bass
- Billy Cobham, Rick Marotta, Frank Zee: Drums
- Gilmore Degap, Rubens Bassini: Congas, Percussion

=== Strings ===
- David Nadien, Elliot Rosoff, Emanuel Green, Gene Orloff, Harold Kohon, Harry Cykman, Harry Glickman, Harry Lookofsky, Irving Spice, Joe Malin, Max Ellen, Paul Gershman: Violin
- Alfred Brown, Emanuel Vardi: Viola
- Alan Shulman, Charles McCracken, George Ricci: Cello

=== Woodwinds ===
- Joe Temperley: Baritone Sax
- George Marge, Hubert Laws, Jerry Dodgion, Romeo Penque: Flute
- Tony Studd: Bass Trombone
- Garnett Brown, Wayne Andre: Trombone
- Brooks Tillotson, Jim Buffington: French Horn
- Alan Rubin, Marvin Stamm, Jon Faddis: Flugelhorn and Trumpet
- Burt Collins, Joe Shepley, Victor Paz: Trumpet

== Later releases ==
This album was reissued on the Super Audio CD format in October 2017 by UK label Dutton Vocalion, Remastered in both Stereo and Surround Sound from the original analogue tapes by Michael J. Dutton and released as a 2-fer with 1973's "Prelude". The Surround Sound portion of the disc features the Quadraphonic mixes of both "Prelude" and "Deodato 2" made available for the first time in over 40 years.

== Sources ==
- Didier Deutch, Deodato 2 sleeve text
