= Ithamara Koorax =

Brazilian jazz and pop singer (born 1965)

- Born: Ita Mara Jarlicht; May 23, 1965 (age 61); Rio de Janeiro, Brazil
- Genres: Jazz, bossa nova
- Occupation: Singer
- Years active: 1990–present
- Labels: Paddle Wheel, Milestone, Irma, Jazz Vision
- Website: koorax.com

Ithamara Koorax (born April 28, 1965) is a Brazilian jazz and pop singer. For several years, she was voted one of the best jazz singers of the world by DownBeat Readers Polls. In 2008 and 2009, Koorax placed third in the "Female Vocalist" category on the 73rd DownBeat Readers Polls, with Diana Krall on the first place and Cassandra Wilson on second, (DownBeat's December 2008 issue, page 44), as well as on the 74th Annual Readers Poll (December 2009 issue, page 42).

Back in 2002, Koorax had already placed fourth in the 67th Annual DownBeat Readers Poll (December 2002 issue, page 56).

Koorax once again appeared many times as one of the top singers from the 65th DownBeat Readers Poll (December 2000, page 54), to the 77th Annual Readers Poll (category Female Vocalist, page 60), receiving similar acclaim in magazines from the UK (Jazz Journal), France (Jazz Hot), Japan (Swing Journal), Korea (Jazz People) and Switzerland (Jazz 'n' More), among others. In the January 2012 issue of DownBeat magazine (page 48, list of "Best CDs of 2011", her album "O Grande Amor", recorded in Europe with the Peter Scharli Trio, was voted one of the best releases of 2011, receiving a four and one-half raving review. In the January 2008 issue of DownBeat (page 54, list "Best CDs of 2007"), her "Brazilian Butterfly" album was voted one of the best releases of 2007, receiving a 4-star review.

== Early life ==
She was born to a family of Polish Jews who fled Europe during World War II. In her youth Koorax studied piano, opera, and classical music while listening to her parents' collection of Tony Bennett, Frank Sinatra, Ella Fitzgerald, Dave Brubeck, George Shearing, and Teddy Wilson. For influences she has cited Elizete Cardoso, Elis Regina, Betty Carter, Carmen McRae, and Flora Purim, particularly Purim's album Stories to Tell, which inspired her choice of careers.

When she was eighteen years old, she worked as a backup singer for commercials and for pop stars in Brazil. Among those artists were Tim Maia and Vicente Viola.

== Career ==
She has recorded solo albums for the IRMA, Milestone, Mercury, EMI, JVC, King, Huks and Motéma labels, besides fourteen soundtracks for movies and TV series, and also took part in more than 200 special projects and compilations.

Koorax has worked with Antonio Carlos Jobim, Luiz Bonfa, Ron Carter, Larry Coryell, Elizeth Cardoso, Gonzalo Rubalcaba, John McLaughlin, Sadao Watanabe, Hermeto Pascoal, Marcos Valle, Peter Scharli, Jay Berliner, Edu Lobo, Martinho da Vila, Jürgen Friedrich, Claus Ogerman, Dave Brubeck, João Donato, Dom Um Romão, Thiago de Mello, Mario Castro-Neves, Raul de Souza, Chris Conway, Eumir Deodato, Lou Volpe, Laudir de Oliveira, Rodgers Grant, Gil Goldstein, Art Farmer, Eddie Gomez, the groups Azymuth, Gazzara and Os Cariocas, the big bands Amazon and Rio Jazz Orchestra, and the Symphony Orchestras "Petrobras" and "Jazz Sinfonica".

From 1990 to 2003, Koorax recorded over 10 songs for the soundtracks of Brazilian TV soap operas such as Riacho Doce (1990), Araponga (1991), Pedra Sobre Pedra (1992), Renascer (1993), Fera Ferida (1994), Cara & Cora (1995), Estrela Guia (2001, singing the main theme, "Cristal", which became a radio hit in Brazil) and Celebridade (2003, for which she recorded a previously unreleased song written by Antonio Carlos Jobim, "Absolut Lee"), and O Rico e O Lázaro (2019), among others.

Koorax also recorded the soundtracks for four films directed by movie director Silvio Tendler: Glauber, O Filme - Labirinto do Brasil (2003), JK - O Menino Que Sonhou Um País (2002), Tzedaká - 80 Anos do Froein Farain (2003), Marighella - Retrato Falado do Guerilheiro (2001). Koorax also sings on the soundtracks of Mãos de Afeto (1990, directed by Gilberto Gouma), Policarpo Quaresma - Herói do Brasil (1997, directed by Paulo Thiago), and Apenas Meninas (2021), directed by Bianca Lenti for HBO.

Koorax's debut solo album, "Luiza - Live In Rio" was recorded in 1993, followed by "Rio Vermelho" (1995), which features Antonio Carlos Jobim, Luiz Bonfa, Marcos Valle, Ron Carter, Sadao Watanabe. Her third album was a collaboration project with Luiz Bonfa, "Almost In Love - Ithamara Koorax Sings The Luiz Bonfá Songbook" (1996), featuring Bonfa himself on guitar plus special guests Eumir Deodato, Larry Coryell, Sadao Watanabe, Torcuato Mariano.

"Wave 2001" (1997) was recorded in Tokyo, with Japanese musicians such as Tomonao Hara and Eijiro Nakagawa, during an Asian tour the previous year. It was followed by "Bossa Nova Meets Drum 'N' Bass" (1998), recorded in New York.

Koorax signed a deal with Milestone Records in 2000 and released two albums produced by Arnaldo DeSouteiro for the San Francisco-based label: "Serenade In Blue" (2001, featuring Gonzalo Rubalcaba, Azymuth, Eumir Deodato, Jay Berliner, Marcos Valle) and "Love Dance" (2003, with John McLaughlin, Dom Um Romão, João Palma, Marcos Valle, Jurgen Friedrich, Azymuth).

In 2009, "Bim Bom - The Complete Joao Gilberto Songbook," a duo session with guitarist Juarez Moreira, received rave reviews in the New York Times, Cashbox, Billboard, Jazz Hot, Jazz 'n' More, All Music Guide, and many other magazines, websites and newspapers.

Another CD, "O Grande Amor," recorded during a European tour with the Peter Schärli Trio in 2010, was also released with critical acclaim, receiving a 4 and 1/2 star review in the May 2011 issue of DownBeat magazine and 5-star ratings in several other magazines like Jazz 'n' More. Later on, O Grande Amor was elected one of the "Best CDs of 2011" in the January 2012 issue of DownBeat.

Her recordings have been remixed by DJs from all over the world. Among them: Tom Novy, Parov Stelar, Cargo, Tetsu Shibuya/Brisa. During 2010, Ithamara performed 47 concerts in Brazil and 51 abroad, having toured Europe and Asia.

Koorax's jazz-pop album "Got to Be Real," produced and arranged by Arnaldo DeSouteiro, was released worldwide in March 2012 by IRMA Records, with critical acclaim and immediate sales.

A bossa nova album, "The Girl from Ipanema - Ithamara Koorax Sings Getz/Gilberto," on which she revisited the material from the legendary album "Getz/Gilberto" (1964) recorded by Stan Getz and João Gilberto, and the dance-oriented electronic project "Ecstasy," were also released in 2013.

Koorax has performed in the U.S., Japan, Korea and many European countries (England, France, Germany, Switzerland, Czech Republic, Finland, Bulgaria, Serbia, Portugal), appearing at jazz festivals in London, Seoul, Belgrade, Funchal, Helsinki, and Indijja. She has performed classical and fusion concerts with symphony orchestras, appearing at the Theatro Minicipal do Rio de Janeiro (RJ) with the Petrobras Symphony and at the Ibirapuera Auditorium (São Paulo) with the Orquestra Jazz Sinfônica.

In 2010, she performed 47 concerts in Brazil and 51 abroad, having toured Europe and Asia. On tour in August 2010, she recorded Arirang with Korean pop stars, Brazilian musicians Rodrigo Lima, Arnaldo DeSouteiro and Wilson Chaplin, and American jazzmen Lee Ritenour and Alan Broadbent.

Koorax's crossover classics project Opus Classico (2013) contained works by Rachmaninoff, Chopin, Wagner, Debussy, Fauré, Ravel and Brazilian composers Heitor Villa-Lobos, Delza Agricola, Chiquinha Gonzaga and Machado de Assis. Her album All Around the World (2014) was recorded live in Rio, London, Paris, Sofia, Munich, Tokyo, and Seoul, with songs by Antônio Carlos Jobim, Jorge Ben, Marvin Gaye, Herbie Hancock, and Jimi Hendrix.

"Ithamara Koorax Sings The Jazz Masters," recorded by Rudy Van Gelder and dedicated to the audio engineer was released in 2017, featuring pianists Rodgers Grant and Norman Simmons, followed by "60 Years of Bossa Nova" in 2018.

Several singles have been released in 2023 and 2024, such as Feel Like Making Love (a celebration of the 50th anniversary of Roberta Flack's number 1 pop hit) and Samba do Dom Natural on which Koorax sings in duet with the song composer, Carlos Pingarilho, a Bossa Nova living legend who is celebrating his 85th birthday. Koorax also appears as special guest on Gustavo Cysne's Dive Into The Deep Blue, released in July 2024, and currently on the top of the All About Jazz charts.

A new single came out in March 2025, "Spirit of Summer", produced by Arnaldo DeSouteiro in collaboration with arranger, producer and keyboardist Eumir Deodato as part of an upcoming album project. For the first time, "Spirit of Summer" was recorded and released in the U.S. with lyrics written by Deodato himself.

== Personal life ==
Koorax was married to journalist Mauro Dias from 1983 to 1989. In April 1990, Ithamara Koorax married fellow musician and producer Arnaldo DeSouteiro.

== Discography ==
- Luiza (Victor, 1993)
- Rio Vermelho (Imagem, 1995)
- Red River (Paddle Wheel, 1995)
- Ithamara Koorax Sings the Luiz Bonfa Songbook with Luiz Bonfa (Paddle Wheel, 1996)
- Wave 2001 (Paddle Wheel, 1997)
- Almost in Love (Imagem, 1997)
- Bossa Nova Meets Drum and Bass (Paddle Wheel, 1998)
- Serenade in Blue (Milestone, 2000)
- Cry Me a River (Huks, 2001)
- Someday (Huks, 2002)
- Amor Sem Adeus: The Luiz Bonfa Songbook (Huks, 2002)
- Love Dance: The Ballad Album (Milestone, 2003)
- Autumn in New York with Jurgen Friedrich (JSR/EMI 2004)
- Brazilian Butterfly (Irma, 2006)
- Tributo a Stellinha Egg (CEDEM, 2007)
- Obrigado Dom Um Romão" with the Peter Scharli Trio (TCB, 2008)
- Bim Bom: The Complete Joao Gilberto Songbook with Juarez Moreira (Motema, 2009)
- O Grande Amor with Peter Scharli (TCB, 2010)
- Got to Be Real (Irma, 2012)
- Opus Classico (Arte Nova, 2013)
- Ecstasy (Jazz Vision, 2013)
- Ithamara Koorax Sings Getz/Gilberto (Jazz Vision, 2013)
- All Around the World (Jazz Vision, 2014)
- Sings the Jazz Masters (Jazz Vision, 2017)
- 60 Years of Bossa Nova (Jazz Vision, 2018)
- Samba do Dom Natural with Carlos Pingarilho (JSR/Tratore, 2023)
- Feel Like Making Love (JSR/Tratore, 2024)
- Spirit of Summer with Eumir Deodato (JSR/Tratore, 2025)

=== As guest ===
- Antenor Bogea, Renaitre (EMSE, 2013)
- Antonio Carlos Jobim, Songbook Antonio Carlos Jobim (Lumiar, 1993)
- Brazil All-Stars, Rio Strut (Milestone, 2002)
- Carlos Pingarilho, Histórias e Sonhos (JSR, 2003)
- Cesar Machado, Made for US (Acoustic Music, 2014)
- Chris Conway, Chocolate Bossa (Oblong Music, 2007)
- Chris Conway, Through Mirrors We Met (Aloft, 2014)
- David Calderoni, Dear Mom Beija-Flor (Tratore, 2022)
- Dom Um Romão, Rhythm Traveller (JSR/Mr. Bongo, 1998)
- Dom Um Romão, Lake of Perseverance (JSR/IRMA, 2001)
- Dom Um Romão, Nu Jazz Meets Brazil (JSR/IRMA, 2003)
- Dorival Caymmi, Dorival Caymmi Songbook, Vol. 1 (Lumiar, 1993)
- Eduardo Camenietzki, Glauber Rocha - Original Soundtrack (EC, 2021)
- Elizeth Cardoso, Ary Amoroso (Sony, 1990)
- Gazzara, Brother And Sister (Halidon, 2006)
- Gustavo Cysne, Dive Into The Deep Blue (JSR/Tratore, 2024)
- Jorge Pescara, Grooves in the Temple (JSR/Tratore, 2005)
- Jorge Pescara, Grooves in the Eden (JSR/Tratore, 2018)
- JSR All-Stars, Friends from Brazil 2001 (IRMA, 2001)
- Lou Volpe, Undercovers (Jazz Guitar Records, 2006)
- Marcelo Salazar, Tropical Lounge Project (JSR, 2005)
- Marcos Valle, Songbook Marcos Valle, Vol. 1 (Lumiar, 1998)
- Mario Castro-Neves, On a Clear Bossa Day (JSR/Rambling, 2004)
- Mario Conde, Guitarra Brasil Universo (Gramofone, 2011)
- Orquestra Petrobrás, Pró-Música (OPPM, 1998)
- Paula Faour, Cool Bossa Struttin (JSR/Paddle Wheel, 2001)
- Rodrigo Lima, Saga (JSR, 2014)
- Rodrigo Lima, Apenas Meninas - Original Soundtrack (HBO, 2021)
- Rodrigo Lima with Ithamara Koorax, Espelho Solar (JSR, 2022)
- Rodrigo Lima with Ithamara Koorax, Espelho Solar - Radio Edit Single (JSR, 2023)
- Thiago de Mello, Amor Mais-Que-Perfeito (Ethos Brasil, 2006)
- Thiago de Mello and Dexter Payne, Another Feeling (Dexofon, 2007)
- Vinicius de Moraes, Songbook Vinicius de Moraes Vol. 2 (Lumiar, 1993)
