= S.O.S., Fire in the Sky =

Song by Deodato

Single by Deodato

from the album Motion
- Released: 1984
- Label: Warner Bros. Records
- Songwriters: Rick Suchow; Alan Palanker
- Producer: Deodato

"S.O.S., Fire in the Sky" is a song recorded by Deodato for his 1984 album Motion and released by Warner Bros Records. The song, which featured vocals by Camille and was written by Rick Suchow and Alan Palanker, reached the top 20 of the Billboard Dance chart and stayed on the chart for 14 weeks in 1985. It also entered the top 10 pop charts in France and Holland and also reached number one on the dance chart in Holland. The album was re-issued in 2006 by Wounded Bird Records.

Personnel on "S.O.S., Fire in the Sky" includes Deodato and Alan Palanker (keyboards and programming), Rick Suchow (bass synth and drum programming), Earl Gardener (trumpet), Bob Malach (tenor sax), Keith O'Quinn (trombone), and Jerry Barnes and Katrese Barnes (background vocals), while Camille handled lead and some background vocals. The song was produced by Deodato.

The song was used for TV Bandeirantes (Band), a Brazilian TV network, in the promos.
