= Also Sprach Zarathustra (2001) =

- Cover art of the Dutch vinyl single

Single by Deodato

from the album Prelude
- B-side: "Spirit of Summer"
- Released: 1973
- Recorded: September 12–14, 1972
- Studio: Van Gelder Studios, Englewood Cliffs, New Jersey
- Genre: Jazz-funk; progressive funk
- Length: 9:00 (album version); 5:06 (single version)
- Label: CTI
- Songwriter: Richard Strauss
- Producer: Creed Taylor

Deodato singles chronology
"Also Sprach Zarathustra (2001)" (1973)	"Rhapsody in Blue" (1973)

Official audio
- "Also Sprach Zarathustra (2001)" (album version) on YouTube

"Also Sprach Zarathustra (2001)" is an instrumental by Brazilian musician Eumir Deodato, from his 1973 album Prelude. It is a heavily jazz-funk styled rendition of the introduction from the 1896 Richard Strauss composition Also sprach Zarathustra. The "(2001)" mentioned is a reference to the soundtrack for the film 2001: A Space Odyssey.

Released as the album's first single in early 1973, his rendition peaked at number 2 on the U.S. Billboard Hot 100 singles chart on 31 March 1973 (behind Roberta Flack's "Killing Me Softly with His Song"), number 3 in Canada, and number 7 on the UK Singles Chart. It won the 16th Annual Grammy Awards Grammy Award for Best Pop Instrumental Performance.

The track has appeared on many compilation and re-issue albums since 1973.

== Charts ==
=== Weekly charts ===
Chart (1973)	Peak position
Canadian RPM 100 Singles Chart	3
Canadian RPM AC Chart	22
New Zealand (Listener)	15
UK Singles Chart	7
US Billboard Easy Listening	5
US Billboard Hot 100	2

=== Year-end charts ===
Chart (1973)	Position
Canada RPM (magazine)	42
US Billboard Year-End	90

== In popular culture ==
- The track was used in the 1979 film Being There starring Peter Sellers, as his character leaves home for the very first time.
- Retired professional wrestler and pop culture personality Ric Flair used several versions of the opening fanfare as his entrance theme for the majority of his in-ring career.
- The band Phish has played a cover of this song over 200 times across their various live shows.

== Lead musicians ==
- Eumir Deodato – piano, electric piano
- Ron Carter – electric bass, double bass
- Stanley Clarke – electric bass
- Billy Cobham – drums
- John Tropea – electric guitar
- Jay Berliner – guitar
- Airto Moreira – percussion
- Ray Barretto – congas
- Uncredited: string and brass instruments
