= Spaces and Places =

Studio album by Kerri Chandler
- Released: September 26, 2022
- Genre: Deep house; big room house
- Length: 181:59
- Label: Kaoz Theory

Kerri Chandler chronology
Computer Games (2008)	Spaces and Places (2022)

Singles from Spaces and Places
- 1. "Never Thought [Printworks]" Released: April 20, 2022; 2. "You Get Lost In It [The Warehouse Project]" Released: May 6, 2022; 3. "Change Your Mind [District 8]" Released: May 27, 2022; 4. "Who Knows [Barbarellas]" Released: July 15, 2022; 5. "Hurry Up [Ministry of Sound]" Released: August 26, 2022

Spaces and Places is the eighth studio album by American deep house DJ and producer Kerri Chandler. It was released on September 26, 2022, on Chandler's record label Kaoz Theory. The three-hour album consists of 24 tracks, each recorded at a different nightclub around the world.

== Background ==
Spaces and Places was Kerri Chandler's first full-length solo album in 14 years, following 2008's Computer Games. Chandler created the album as a tribute to the global nightclub scene, with each of the album's 24 tracks composed, performed, and recorded live at a different nightclub dance floor around the world.

Regarding the album's inspiration, Chandler explained, "I wanted to express the love of what could be possible in capturing my productions in the venue, from the heart of each space, right on the dance floor and I translate it onto this album, which I created over the course of 4 years and 24 venues later."

== Recording ==
During the album's four-year recording process, Chandler set up a temporary recording studio in each club while it was empty, allowing him to tailor each track to its venue's distinctive architectural acoustics. For certain tracks, he consulted the club's staff to determine which kick drum sounded best on their dance floor, matched the tempo of the track to the speed of the room's echo, recorded the ambient noise emitted by the club's LED lights, and intentionally included background noise from a nearby bingo hall and train terminal. He mixed the entire album in Dolby Atmos, enabling spatial audio on every track.

Featured artists on Spaces and Places include Chandler's friend DJ Deep, DJ Deep's son, and Chandler's cousin Aaron Braxton Jr., a gospel singer whose featured track "Back to Earth (Find Your Peace)" is a tribute to Braxton's late father, Chandler's uncle.

== Critical reception ==
Spaces and Places was released to critical acclaim. Writing for Resident Advisor, Andrew Ryce praised the album's "three hours of immaculate big-room house," describing it as "a master at his craft blessing each venue with its very own Chandler groove, a sound that feels both eternal and comforting, and will for a long time."

The album was nominated for Best Album at the DJ Mag Best of North America Awards 2023.

== Track listing ==
No.	Title	Length
1.	"Back to Earth (Find Your Peace) [The Knockdown Center]" (feat. Aaron Braxton Jr.)	7:31
2.	"Never Thought [Printworks] (Main Vocal Mix)" (feat. Sunchilde)	6:17
3.	"Milan [Magazzini Generali] (Full Sax Mix)" (feat. Mauro Capitale)	5:59
4.	"You Get Lost in It [The Warehouse Project] (Full Vocal Main Mix)" (feat. Lady Linn)	6:58
5.	"Hurry Up [Ministry of Sound] (Kerri's Again Mix)" (feat. Dreamer G)	6:55
6.	"Tenacity [Output] (Main Vocal Mix)" (feat. Bluey Robinson)	6:25
7.	"Kaiku [Kaiku] (Disco Version)" (feat. Patrick Mangan and Yaniel)	6:43
8.	"Industria [Industria]"	8:05
9.	"Dirty [Rex] (DJ Deep's Son & Dad Edit)" (feat. DJ Deep and Leirbag)	6:58
10.	"I See [Razzmatazz] (Full Mix)"	6:40
11.	"The Piano Thing (Live) [Eathos]"	7:51
12.	"Sunrise [Watergate]"	7:15
13.	"See the Light [Lux Frágil] (Original Long Vocoder Vocal Mix)"	8:15
14.	"Sun of Sound [Plan B] (Vocal Mix)" (feat. Troy Denari)	8:28
15.	"Keep One (But Do It Again) [Sir Henry's]"	7:05
16.	"Who Knows [Barbarellas] (Media Vocal Mix)" (feat. Dora Dora)	6:39
17.	"Let It [Basic Club] (Kerri's Full Vocal Mix)"	5:54
18.	"Change Your Mind [District 8] (Full Vocal)" (feat. Troy Denari)	9:29
19.	"Joyful Life [De Marktkantine] (Full Vocal Mix)" (feat. Mona Lee)	6:46
20.	"The Morning Heat [La Grange] (Main Mix)" (feat. Nadir Simon)	8:04
21.	"The Calling [Club Qu]"	15:17
22.	"Feelin' Red [DC10] (Pull the 9 Out Mix)"	7:08
23.	"Subbie [Sub Club] (The Jackpot Mix)"	6:55
24.	"The Box Frame [Halcyon]"	8:22
Total length:		181:59
