= Are You for Real =

Single by Deodato

from the album Motion
- Released: 1984
- Genre: Electronic, funk, jazz
- Length: 5:07
- Label: Warner Bros.
- Songwriter: Rick Suchow
- Producer: Eumir Deodato

"Are You for Real" is a song recorded by Brazilian musician Deodato for his 1984 album Motion and released by Warner Bros. Records. The song, which features vocals by Camille and was written by Rick Suchow, reached the top 20 of the Billboard Dance chart and stayed on the chart for 12 weeks in 1985. The album was re-issued in 2006 by Wounded Bird Records.

Personnel on "Are You for Real" includes Deodato and Alan Palanker (keyboards and programming), Rick Suchow (bass and programming), Jerry Barnes (guitar) and Nelson Rangell (alto sax) while Camille handled all lead and background vocals. The song was produced by Deodato.

In 1990, a cover version of "Are You for Real" was recorded by the freestyle dance group TKA and released by Tommy Boy Records on their Louder Than Love album. Camille added a special guest vocal to this version as well, and the group performed the song live on NBC-TV's Showtime at the Apollo television show.

Personnel on the TKA track include Mac Quayle and Joey Moskowitz (keyboards and programming) and Roger Byam (sax). The song was produced by Joey Gardner.
