= TKA =

American freestyle music band

- Origin: Upper Manhattan, New York City, U.S.
- Genres: Latin freestyle, house
- Years active: 1984–1991, 2001–present
- Labels: Tommy Boy; Warner
- Members: K7; Tre Deuce
- Past members: Aby Cruz; Tony Ortiz; Angel Vasquez; Carlos "Los" Reyes

TKA is an American freestyle/house boy band who were most prominent in the 1980s and early 1990s, particularly in New York City, and Miami. Their name is an acronym that represents their collective initials, and it was said for a time that it also stood for "Total Knowledge in Action." All of TKA's members are of Puerto Rican descent. Many freestyle fans consider them the kings of that genre, although Kayel seemingly downplayed this label, having jokingly stated, "There are no kings in freestyle. TKA is the best-selling and widely considered the most prominent and successful Latin freestyle band in recorded history.

== History ==
Hailing from Upper Manhattan, TKA would sing at local sweet sixteen parties in the East Harlem neighborhood known as "El Barrio" in 1984. Kayel ran across the offices of Tommy Boy records and met and invited Record producer and manager Joey Gardner, to attend a performance at St. Francis de Sales, Gardner was impressed with the trio, and helped them to get signed with Tommy Boy Records. Its members originally were Louis "Kayel" Sharpe, Tony Ortiz, Ray Spider Rivera, Linda "La India" Caballero and Ralph "Aby" Cruz—the original lead singer. During their Early success Spider was asked to leave, La India left to pursue a solo dance music & salsa career and eventually Aby as well, the latter was later replaced by Angel "Love" Vasquez, which allowed Kayel to assume the lead vocals. after the release of the single "Tears May Fall." Although not widely known, India was a member of the group in its earliest days, as well, billed as Linda Caballero. The group's first single was "One Way Love," a major hit in the Latin club communities in the New York metropolitan area, Philadelphia, and Miami, which was followed by "Come Get My Love."

An album was then recorded, titled Scars of Love, released on October 11, 1987 through Tommy Boy Records. which included the first two singles. The album spawned six singles. The title track was then released as a single, followed by "Tears May Fall", "X-Ray Vision", and "Don't Be Afraid". "One Way Love," was the most successful single, which reached number 75 on the US Billboard Hot 100. No other single from this album managed to enter the Hot 100, although all of them reached the Top 30 of the Billboard Dance Club Songs. The album reached number 135 on the Billboard 200 in 1988. In 1989, the soundtrack of the film Lean on Me featured the single "You Are the One", which hit #91 on the Billboard Hot 100.

The song "You Are the One", was released before Louder Than Love in 1989 to promote the film Lean on Me, as the song was featured on the soundtrack album. The song reached position No. 91 on the Billboard Hot 100 in June 1989. The second studio album was released by Tommy Boy Records on August 15, 1990. Unlike its predecessor, Scars of Love, the album failed to chart on the U.S. Billboard magazine Top Pop Albums chart, and received a weaker review (retrospectively) by AllMusic's Alex Henderson. Four singles were released, three of which charted on the Billboard Hot 100 singles chart. In 1990, the singles "I Won't Give Up on You" and "Crash (Have Some Fun)" (the latter credited to "TKA featuring Michelle Visage") reached the No. 65 and No. 80 respectively. The final single, "Louder Than Love" got to No. 62 on the Billboard Hot 100 in October 1991.

That same year the trio also performed the song "Are You for Real" on the popular syndicated television program It's Showtime at the Apollo.

As a result of freestyle's waning popularity as a new age of music dawned and internal group discord, the trio stopped recording soon after the single "Louder Than Love" was released. A greatest hits package was released in 1992, with a new track, "Maria", which was released as a single.

Following the split, the members of TKA went on to pursue independent interests. Kayel recorded under the name K7 and had a hit hip-hop album titled Swing, Batta, Swing, which contains the hit singles "Zunga Zeng" produced by Frankie Cutlass (which interpolates and was loosely based on reggae musician Yellowman's 1983 early dancehall hit "Zungguzungguguzungguzeng"), "Come Baby Come", and the Cab Calloway-influenced "Hi De Ho". Tony established a production company in New York, and Angel formed the contemporary R&B group Goodfellaz.

The trio reunited in 2001 and recorded the album Forever, which was released by Tommy Boy shortly before that company ended its joint venture with Warner Bros. Records. For the first time in the history of TKA, the release featured Tony's lead vocal on one track, "In a Manner of Speaking".

Tony, Aby, and Angel performed together as the original members of TKA, while K7 performed with Tre and Los from the Swing Kids as TKA/K7.

In 2020, Aby reunited with K7 and the lineup of TKA featuring K7, Tre and Los, performing for the first time in over 30 years. For the shows, Aby was billed as a solo artist while performing some songs with the group as AKTual Voices of TKA. This was later shortened to simply AKtual. K7 and Aby (as AKtual) released a single in August 2021 titled "Don't Forsake Me". In 2023, another single was released as Aby featuring Aktual titled "You Didn't Love Me". Los retired from performing at the end of 2023.

Between 2017 and 2022, TKA released a flurry of singles on streaming platforms including "Slipping Through My Hands" (2020) and "Spanish Lullaby" (2022).

== Discography ==
=== Studio albums ===
Year	Album details	Chart positions
Year	Album details	US
1987	Scars of Love: Released: October 11, 1987; Label: Tommy Boy; Formats: CS, CD, LP	135
1990	Louder Than Love: Released: August 15, 1990; Label: Tommy Boy; Formats: CS, CD, LP	—
2001	Forever: Released: October 23, 2001; Label: Tommy Boy; Formats: CD	—
2016	Love Goes On: Released: April 11, 2016; Label: Committee Records; Formats: CD	—

=== Compilations ===
Year	Album details	Chart positions	
Year	Album details	US	US Heat
1992	Greatest Hits: Released: 1992; Label: Tommy Boy; Format: CS, CD	131	3

=== Singles ===
Year	Single	Chart positions				Album
Year	Single	U.S.	U.S. dance	U.S. dance sales	U.S. R&B	Album
1986	"One Way Love"	75	8	30	56	Scars of Love
1986	"Come Get My Love"	—	8	39	—	Scars of Love
1987	"Scars of Love"	—	25	26	—	Scars of Love
1987	"Tears May Fall"	—	6	10	63	Scars of Love
1988	"X-Ray Vision"	—	26	30	—	Scars of Love
1988	"Don't Be Afraid"	—	22	47	—	Scars of Love
1989	"You Are the One"	91	26	20	—	Louder Than Love
1990	"I Won't Give Up on You"	65	15	24	—	Louder Than Love
1990	"Crash (Have Some Fun)"	80	7	10	—	Louder Than Love
1991	"Give Your Love to Me"	—	—	37	—	Louder Than Love
1991	"Louder Than Love"	62	—	—	—	Louder Than Love
1992	"Maria"	44	—	16	—	Greatest Hits
2001	"Feel the Music"	—	—	—	—	Forever
2010	"Set It Off"	—	—	—	—	-
2010	"Hit the Floor"	—	—	—	—	-
2011	"No Need Fly Away"	—	—	—	—	-
2011	"La Verdad (Yo Soy Boriqua)"	—	—	—	—	-
2011	"She Wants It All"	—	—	—	—	-
2011	"When Will I C U Again"	—	—	—	—	-
2011	"Let It Go"	—	—	—	—	-
2020	"Slipping Through My Hands”	—	—	—	—	-

== See also ==
- Nuyorican
- Puerto Ricans in New York City
