= Madhouse on Madison =

Madhouse on Madison most commonly refers to two stadiums that have existed on Madison Street in Chicago, Illinois. They have been home to some of Chicago's professional sports teams, including the Chicago Blackhawks and Chicago Bulls. It may refer to:

- Chicago Stadium (1929–1994)
- United Center (1995–present)
