= Sylvia Telles =

Brazilian singer (1934–1966)

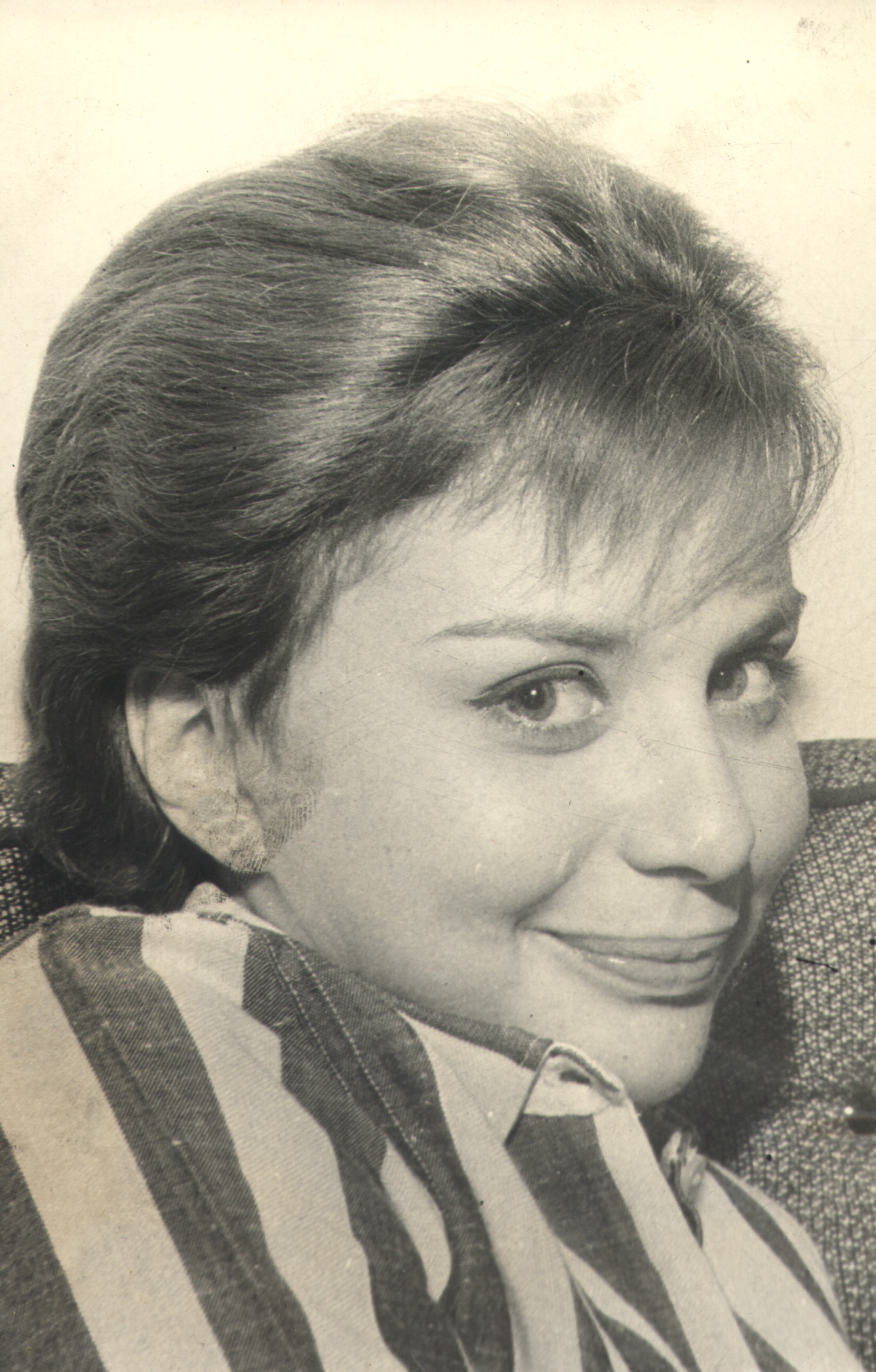
- Born: 27 August 1934; São Paulo, Brazil
- Died: 17 December 1966 (aged 32); Brazil
- Musical career
- Genres: Bossa nova; MPB; Latin
- Occupations: Singer; composer
- Years active: 1954–1966
- Labels: Odeon; Philips; Elenco

Silvia D'Atri Telles (Brazilian Portuguese: [ˈsiwvia ˈtɛlis]; 27 August 1934 – 17 December 1966) was a Brazilian jazz Samba and Bossa Nova singer and composer of the 1950s and 1960s, considered one of the major artists of Bossa nova and MPB. Most of her original recordings are out of print, though occasional compilations are released.

== Life and career ==
Sylvia was born in 1934 in São Paulo, daughter of Paulo Telles and Maria Amelia D'Atri, her mother born in Paris of an Italian father and Brazilian mother. Her maternal grandfather Alessandro D'Atri was editor of the prestigious Révue du Brésil magazine published in Paris in French, Spanish and Italian from 1896. Her father was an aficionado of classical music.

Sylvia had the ambition to be a ballerina. She studied with Madeleine Rosay at the Teatro Municipal's corp de ballet in Rio de Janeiro, but she would also practice singing and playing the piano.

In 1954, family friend Billy Blanco noticed her talent and introduced her to his associates in music, which led to launching her performing career in nightclubs. Around this time she met her first boyfriend João Gilberto, who four years later would himself revolutionize Brazilian music with the introduction of Bossa Nova, but the relationship did not last, as the Telles family disdained the young, eccentric Gilberto, then a vagabond artist without a permanent residence.

Her singing attracted the attention of the Odeon Records, which signed her to an exclusive contract. Her 1955 release "Amendoim Torradinho" got significant airplay and led to the newspaper O Globo awarding her "Cantora Revelação de 1955" (loosely, "singer discovery of 1955"). Also that year she married musician/attorney José Cândido de Mello Mattos. The following year 1956, she and her husband hosted the program Música e Romance on TV Rio, featuring guests Tom Jobim, Dolores Duran, Johnny Alf and Billy Blanco. Sylvia gave birth to the couple's only daughter Cláudia Telles born 16 August 1957, who grew to become a singer/musician/composer in her own right, but Sylvia and Cândinho separated in 1958. That same year she was invited to perform in a show at Grupo Universitário Hebraico, with Carlos Lyra, Roberto Menescal among others, called "Carlos Lyra, Sylvia Telles e os seus Bossa nova" (Carlos Lyra, Sylvia Telles and their Bossa Nova"), which is thought to be the first use of the expression "bossa nova" ("the new thing"). It was the same year João Gilberto released what is considered the first Bossa Nova hit, "Chega de Saudade".

Although Telles had preceded the advent of Bossa Nova, she began performing songs by such influential composers as Antonio Carlos Jobim, and worked with others such as Luiz Bonfá. She also did several tribute albums to Antonio Carlos Jobim. One of the most famous classic Bossa Nova songs was written for her by Jobim, her nickname - "Dindi".

By the early 1960s, she had made her first trip to the United States, recording "U.S.A." with Barney Kessel (among others) for Philips. She also toured Switzerland, France and Germany. Her husband, producer Aloysio de Oliveira, proved instrumental in her later signing to Odeon and Elenco, two labels where he worked. They had married in Las Vegas in 1960, and separated in 1964.

Telles had just recorded her second tribute to Jobim, 1966's The Music of Mr. Jobim (or Sings the Wonderful Songs of Antonio Carlos Jobim), and was travelling to a rustic weekend getaway with her boyfriend Horacinho de Carvalho before she was to fly to New York to work on an LP for Kapp Records. But on the way to the farm, Horacinho fell asleep at the wheel. It was the second time she had been in an asleep-at-the-wheel accident, surviving a minor one in 1964, but this time the car flipped several times, killing both of them. She was 32.

== Discography ==
- Carícia (Odeon, 1957)
- Silvia (Odeon, 1958)
- Amor De Gente Moça: Musicas De Antonio Carlos Jobim (Odeon, 1959)
- Amor Em Hi-Fi (Philips, 1960)
- U.S.A. (Philips, 1961)
- Bossa Balanço Balada (Elenco, 1963)
- Bossa Session (Elenco, 1964) - with Lúcio Alves and Roberto Menescal e seu conjunto
- It Might As Well Be Spring (Elenco, 1966) - U.S. release: The Face I Love (Kapp Records)
- The Music Of Mr. Jobim By Sylvia Telles (Elenco, 1966) - U.S. release: Sylvia Telles Sings The Wonderful Songs Of Antonio Carlos Jobim (Kapp Records)
- Reencontro (Elenco, 1966) - with Edu Lobo, Trio Tamba, and Quinteto Villa-Lobos
