= Prelude (Deodato album) =

- Standard artwork

Studio album by Deodato
- Released: January 1973
- Recorded: September 12–14, 1972 at Van Gelder Studios
- Genres: Jazz-funk; bossa nova
- Length: 31:42
- Label: CTI
- Producer: Creed Taylor

Deodato chronology
Percepção (1972)	Prelude (1973)	Deodato 2 (1973)

Professional ratings
Review scores
Source	Rating
AllMusic	4/5 stars
The Rolling Stone Jazz Record Guide	2/5 stars

Prelude is the eighth studio album by Brazilian keyboardist Eumir Deodato, released in 1973. With the signature track "Also Sprach Zarathustra (2001)" (an arrangement of the theme from 2001: A Space Odyssey), the album can be categorised as classical-jazz fusion, thought by some as elevator music with a twist. Prelude would become the most successful recording for Deodato and CTI Records.

The album features guitarist John Tropea on three tracks, bassists Ron Carter and Stanley Clarke, and Billy Cobham on drums. The funk-influenced version of the "Introduction" from Richard Strauss's Also sprach Zarathustra, entitled "Also Sprach Zarathustra (2001)", won the 1974 Grammy Award for Best Pop Instrumental Performance and went to number two in the pop charts in the US, number three in Canada, and number seven in the UK. In 1977, the album was re-released briefly as 2001 with an alternate cover photo.

== Later releases ==
This album was reissued on the Super Audio CD format in October 2017 by UK label Dutton Vocalion, Remastered in both Stereo and Surround Sound from the original analogue tapes by Michael J. Dutton and released as a 2-fer with 1973's "Deodato 2". The Surround Sound portion of the disc features the Quadraphonic mixes of both "Prelude" and "Deodato 2" made available for the first time in over 40 years.

== Track listing ==
Side A
No.	Title	Writer(s)	Length
1.	"Also Sprach Zarathustra (2001)"	Richard Strauss	9:00
2.	"Spirit of Summer"	Eumir Deodato	4:04
3.	"Carly & Carole"	Deodato	3:38

Side B
No.	Title	Writer(s)	Length
1.	"Baubles, Bangles and Beads"	Robert Wright, George Forrest	5:20
2.	"Prelude to the Afternoon of a Faun"	Claude Debussy	5:13
3.	"September 13"	Deodato, Billy Cobham	5:24

== Charts ==
Chart (1973)	Peak position
Australia (Kent Music Report)	17
Canada (RPM (magazine))	6

== Personnel ==
- Eumir Deodato - piano, electric piano
- Ron Carter - electric bass (solo on "Baubles, Bangles and Beads"), bass
- Stanley Clarke - electric bass (solo on "Also Sprach Zarathustra (2001)")
- Billy Cobham - drums
- John Tropea - electric guitar (solo on "Also Sprach Zarathustra (2001)", "Baubles, Bangles and Beads", "September 13")
- Jay Berliner - guitar (solo on "Spirit of Summer")
- Airto Moreira - percussion
- Ray Barretto - congas
- Hubert Laws - flute (solo on "Prelude to Afternoon of a Faun")
- John Frosk - trumpet
- Marky Markowitz - trumpet
- Joe Shepley - trumpet
- Marvin Stamm - trumpet (solo on "Prelude to Afternoon of a Faun")
- Wayne Andre - trombone
- Garnett Brown - trombone
- Paul Faulise - trombone
- George Strakey - trombone
- Bill Watrous - trombone
- Jim Buffington - french horn
- Peter Gordon - french horn
- Phil Bodner - flute
- George Marge - flute
- Romeo Penque - flute
- Max Ellen - violin
- Paul Gershman - violin
- Emanuel Green - violin
- Harry Lookofsky - violin
- David Nadien - violin
- Gene Orloff - violin
- Eliot Rosoff - violin
- Emanuel Vardi - viola
- Al Brown - viola
- Harvey Shapiro - cello
- Seymore Barab - cello
- Charles McKracken - cello

== Production ==
- Producer: Creed Taylor
- Arranged and conducted by Eumir Deodato
- Engineer: Rudy Van Gelder
- Recorded at Van Gelder Studios

== Sources ==
- Steve Futterman, Prelude sleeve text
