= Wanda Sá =

Brazilian bossa nova singer and guitarist

Wanda Maria Ferreira de Sá (born July 1, 1944) (also Wanda de Sah) is a Brazilian bossa nova singer and guitarist, active from 1964 to the present day.

Her first guitar teacher, when she was 13, was Roberto Menescal. Later, she worked with Sérgio Mendes in his group Brasil '65' and also with Marcos Valle and Kátya Chamma. Francisco Tenório Júnior and Ugo Marotta played on her debut album Vagamente in 1964.

She was married to legendary Brazilian singer, songwriter, guitarist and composer Edu Lobo from 1969 until 1982.

In 2011, she made her first appearance in the United States since 1999, playing with Marcos Valle at Birdland in New York City. The Wall Street Journal described her as "legendary". National Public Radio called her "one of Brazil's best-kept musical secrets".

== Selected discography ==
- Wanda Vagamente (RGE, 1964)
- The Sergio Mendes Trio Introduces Wanda de Sah (Capitol, 1965)
- Softly! (Capitol, 1965)
- So Nice (Sears, 1965)
- Domingo Azul Do Mar (Deckdisc, 2002)

=== With Paul Desmond ===
- From the Hot Afternoon (CTI, 1969)

=== With João Donato ===
- Wanda Sá com João Donato (Deckdisc, 2003)

=== With Sergio Mendes and Brasil '65 ===
- In Person at El Matador (Atlantic, 1965)
- Brasil '65 (a.k.a. In The Brazilian Bag) (Capitol, 1965)

=== With Célia Vaz ===
- Brasileiras (CID, 1994, released in US, 1996 as 'Amazon River')
