= Cláudia Telles =

Brazilian singer (1957–2020)

Cláudia Telles de Mello Mattos (August 26, 1957 – February 21, 2020) was a Brazilian singer, composer, and musician. She was known for her romantic songs, including the hits "Fim de Tarde" and "Eu Preciso Te Esquecer."

== Biography ==
Cláudia Telles was born in Rio de Janeiro, Brazil, in 1957. Her parents were the musician and lawyer Candinho and the singer Sylvia Telles, who separated shortly after Cláudia's birth. When she was a young child, her mother occasionally brought her onstage to sing with her. Cláudia's mother died in a car crash when she was only 9 years old, and she was raised by her maternal grandparents, having little contact with her father. Her grandparents, in turn, died by the time she was 16, at which point she moved on her own into her mother's former apartment in Copacabana. It was in this period that she began performing in stage musicals.

Telles began singing backup on the records of various famous artists, including The Fevers, Roberto Carlos, José Augusto, Gilberto Gil, Jerry Adriani, Jorge Ben, Belchior, Simone, Rita Lee, and Fafá de Belém. Her big break came when she joined the Trio Esperança after a member became pregnant and had to take time away from the group. Telles subbed in for recordings and performances, gaining public recognition and becoming committed to a career in music.

She spent a year singing with Chiquinho do Acordeom's group, then left when Walter D'Ávila Filho and CBS's Mauro Motta recruited her to record her own music, finding her voice similar to her mother's but with a metallic tone. Her song "Fim de Tarde" reached the top of the charts and was one of the biggest hits of 1976, selling over 500,000 copies.

Telles continued performing, both her own compositions and songs made famous by her mother, such as "Dindi." That song was included on her first LP, released in 1977. Two more hits followed, "Eu Preciso Te Esquecer" and "Aprenda a Amar," the former of which was included on the soundtrack for the telenovela Locomotivas.

She went on to release ten soul and bossa nova albums over the course of her career, although none as successful as her debut. Her 1997 album "Por causa de você" paid tribute to her late mother.

Telles died of heart failure in Rio in 2020, at age 62.

== Discography ==
=== Albums ===
- "Claudia Telles" - 1977
- "Miragem" - 1978
- "Eu quero ser igual a todo mundo" - 1979
- "Solidão pra que" - 1988
- "Claudia Telles interpreta Nelson Cavaquinho e Cartola" - 1995
- "Por causa de você" - 1997
- "Chega de Saudade - Tributo a Vinicius de Moraes" - 2000
- "Sambas e Bossas" - 2002
- "Tributo a Tom Jobim" - 2004
- "Quem sabe você" - 2009

=== Singles ===
- "Fim de Tarde" - 1976
- "Eu Preciso Te Esquecer" - 1977
- "Aprenda a amar" - 1977
- "Por eu não saber" - 1978
- "Eu voltei" - 1976
- "Tanto amor" - 1976
