= K7 (musician) =

American musician

- Also known as: K7, Kayel
- Born: Louis Sharpe; August 25, 1966 (age 60)
- Origin: Ponce, Puerto Rico, and New York, New York
- Genres: Hip hop, house, new jack swing, Latin freestyle
- Occupations: Rapper, singer, songwriter, musician, producer
- Instrument: Vocals
- Years active: 1986–present
- Labels: Tommy Boy, Warner Bros.

Louis Sharpe (born August 25, 1966), better known by his stage names K7 or Kayel, is an American rapper, singer, songwriter, musician and record producer. K7 is the frontman of TKA, the best-selling Latin freestyle group in history. He is signed with Tommy Boy Records.

In 1993, K7 released the album, Swing Batta Swing, which featured three singles that reached pop radio: "Zunga Zeng" (produced by Frankie Cutlass), "Hi-De-Ho" (also notably on The Mask film soundtrack), and K7's biggest hit, "Come Baby Come", which reached No. 18 on the Billboard Hot 100, and No. 3 on the UK Singles Chart.

K7 worked on the air on Manhattan radio stations Hot 97 and WKTU. K7 released another album in 2002 called Love, Sex, Money. His most recent album, The King's Agenda, was released in March 2009 and is available on iTunes. K7, along with the other members of TKA, continues to tour and perform in nightclubs around the U.S.

== Discography ==
=== Albums ===
| Title | Details | Chart positions | | | Certifications (sales thresholds) |
| Title | Details | US | US R&B | UK | Certifications (sales thresholds) |
|---|---|---|---|---|---|
| Swing Batta Swing | Released: November 9, 1993; Label: Tommy Boy | 96 | 54 | 27 | RIAA: Gold |
| Love, Sex, Money | Released: April 9, 2002; Label: Select | — | — | — | |
| The King's Agenda (Available on iTunes only) | Released: March 26, 2009; Label: | — | — | — | |

=== Singles ===
List of singles, with selected chart positions
| Title | Year | Peak chart positions | | | Album |
| Title | Year | US | AUS | UK | Album |
|---|---|---|---|---|---|
| "Come Baby Come" | 1993 | 18 | 68 | 3 | Swing Batta Swing |
| "Zunga Zeng" | 1993 | 61 | — | 63 | Swing Batta Swing |
| "Hi De Ho" | 1994 | 123 | 96 | 17 | Swing Batta Swing |
| "Move It Like This" | 1994 | 54 | — | — | Swing Batta Swing |

== See also ==
- Nuyorican
- Puerto Ricans in New York City
