= Swing Batta Swing =

Studio album by K7
- Released: November 9, 1993
- Recorded: January–September 1993
- Genre: Hip hop
- Length: 56:46
- Label: Tommy Boy
- Producer: K7 (also exec. producer); Joey Gardner (also exec. producer); Frankie Cutlass; Mike Lorello

K7 chronology
| Swing Batta Swing (1993) | Love, Sex, Money (2002) |

Alternative cover

Singles from Swing Batta Swing
- 1. "Come Baby Come" Released: July 27, 1993; 2. "Zunga Zeng" Released: 1993; 3. "Move It Like This" Released: 1994

Swing Batta Swing is the debut studio album by American rapper K7. It was released on November 9, 1993 by Tommy Boy Records and was produced by Frankie Cutlass, K7, Joey Gardner and Mike Lorello. Swing Batta Swing was released with two different album covers.

The album did fairly well on the US charts, peaking at No. 96 on the Billboard 200, No. 54 on the Top R&B/Hip-Hop Albums and No. 1 on the Top Heatseekers. It features four singles, including his most popular song, "Come Baby Come", which made it to No. 18 on the Billboard Hot 100, No. 9 on the Hot Rap Singles and No. 3 in the UK singles chart. Other singles from the album were "Hi De Ho", which was featured in a scene of the 1994 film The Mask (UK No. 17), "Zunga Zeng" (US No. 61, US Rap No. 23, UK No. 63) and "Move It Like This" (US No. 54, US Rap No. 26).

== Critical reception ==
Professional ratings
Review scores
| Source | Rating |
|---|---|
| AllMusic | 4/5 stars |
| Billboard | (favorable) |
| Music Week | 3/5 stars |
| NME | 7/10 |
| Smash Hits | 4/5 stars |

American magazine Billboard wrote, "Recent release from urban pop outfit with strong hip-hop, dance, and reggae leanings shows considerable staying power on The Billboard 200 and the R&B albums chart, largely on the strength of gold cross-format single 'Come Baby Come'. Among the record's other genre-straddling hits are reggae caper 'Move It Like This', house-flavored 'I'll Make You Feel Good', and supremely catchy, upbeat pop tracks 'Let's Bang', 'Hi De Ho', 'Beep Me', and current single 'Zunga Zeng'. In fact, there's not a cut on this formidably deep album that should be ruled out as a potential single." Mark Sutherland from NME wrote, "Yup, K7 and his backing blokes the Swing Kids have done the impossible and crafted an immaculate pop-rap-swingbeat LP that never deviates from the path of wiggy excellence."

== Track listing ==
| No. | Title | Writer(s) | Length |
|---|---|---|---|
| 1. | "Come Baby Come" | K7; Joey Gardner | 3:57 |
| 2. | "Let's Bang" | K7; Gardner; Andy Marvel | 4:56 |
| 3. | "Zunga Zeng" | K7; Gardner; Frank Malave; Henry "Junjo" Lawes; F. Winston Burke | 4:22 |
| 4. | "Hi De Ho" | K7; Tony Moran; Cab Calloway; Irving Mills | 4:33 |
| 5. | "Body Rock" | K7; Gardner; Malave | 5:03 |
| 6. | "I'll Make You Feel Good" | K7; Gardner; Gerald Drummond | 4:54 |
| 7. | "Move It Like This" | K7; Gardner | 5:07 |
| 8. | "Hang On in There Baby" | Johnny Bristol | 3:03 |
| 9. | "Beep Me" | K7; Gardner; Marvel; Kashu Myles | 3:42 |
| 10. | "Hotel Motel" | K7; Gardner; Marvel; Joseph Sadler; Guy Todd Williams | 3:39 |
| 11. | "A Little Help from My Friends" | K7; Gardner; Marvel | 4:01 |
| 12. | "Move It Like This" (Alternate Mix) | K7; Gardner | 5:23 |

Note

- Track 12 available on CD versions only.

== Personnel ==
Adapted from the album's liner notes.

Musicians

- K7 – lead vocals, backing vocals, chants
- Clyde Bone – chants
- Sterling Campbell – live drums
- Lou Cruz – chants
- Daddy I.O.S. – chants
- Craig Derry – backing vocals
- Tre Duece – chants
- Joey Gardner – chants
- Troy Hightower – chants
- Joe Korsch – chants
- Ladies Only – backing vocals
- Mike Lorello – keyboards, chants
- Derek McCleary – backing vocals
- Andy Marvel – keyboards
- Kashu Myles – backing vocals
- Mario Nieves – chants
- Charlie Pena – chants
- Simple Pleasure – backing vocals
- Prophet – chants
- John Raimundi – backing vocals
- Arif St. Michael – backing vocals
- Camille Shea – backing vocals
- Malik Taylor – chants
- Tommy Uzzo – chants
- Vic 13 – chants
- Virgil – chants
- Woodsie – chants

Technical

- K7 – producer, executive producer
- Joey Gardner – producer, executive producer, mixing
- Chris Gehringer – mastering
- Mike Lorello – programming
- Andy Marvel – programming
- Tommy Uzzo – mixing, engineer
- Recorded at Mirror Image, Dix Hills, New York & Unique Recording, New York City, New York
- Mastered at The Hit Factory DMS, New York City, New York

Additional personnel

- Erwin Gorostiza – art direction
- Lan Yin – design
- Guy Aroch – photography
- Kristine Larsen – back cover photography
- Chris Woehrle – logo

== Samples ==
"Come Baby Come"

- "Synthetic Substitution" by Melvin Bliss
- "Straight Up" by Paula Abdul
- "I'll Say It Again" by Sweet Linda Divine

"Let's Bang"

- "Theme from S.W.A.T." by Rhythm Heritage

"Hi De Ho"

- "Minnie the Moocher" by Cab Calloway

"Zunga Zeng"

- "Synthetic Substitution" by Melvin Bliss
- "Zungguzungguguzungguzeng" by Yellowman
- "Can I Get Some Help" by James Brown
- "Dope on a Rope" by Nice & Smooth (original concept)

"Move It Like This"

- "Life (Is What You Make It)" by Frighty and Colonel Mite

"Hotel Motel"

- "Don't Make Me Wait" by the NYC Peech Boys
- "Larry's Dance Theme" by Grandmaster Flash

"A Little Help from My Friends"

- "Everybody Plays the Fool" by The Main Ingredient
- "Monday, Monday" by The Mamas & the Papas
