= Tito Madi =

Brazilian singer and composer (1929–2018)

Chauki Maddi (18 July 1929 – 26 September 2018), better known by his stage name as Tito Madi, was a Brazilian singer and composer. He wrote the songs "Cansei de Ilusões", "Sonho e Saudade" and "Carinho e Amor".
