= Madhouse Records (British record label) =

- Parent company: Champion Records
- Founded: 1992
- Founder: Kerri Chandler, Mel Medalie
- Defunct: 2023
- Genre: House music
- Official website: https://www.madhouserecordsinc.com

Madhouse Records was a British record label that was established by house-music artist Kerri Chandler and label executive Mel Medalie in 1992. In July 2023, after 31 years in business, the label ceased operations and was absorbed by Champion Records.
