= Roberto Menescal =

Brazilian musician and composer

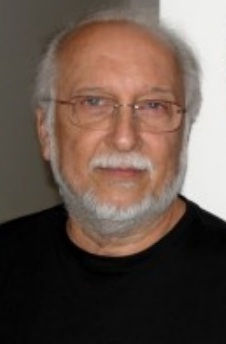

Background information
- Born: October 25, 1937 (age 89); Brazil
- Genres: Bossa nova, samba, música popular brasileira
- Occupations: Musician, composer, record producer, arranger, label owner
- Instrument: Guitar
- Years active: 1950s–present
- Labels: PolyGram, Albatroz

Roberto Menescal (born October 25, 1937) is a Brazilian composer, record producer, guitarist, vocalist, and pioneer of bossa nova. In many of his songs there are references to the sea, including his best-known composition "O Barquinho" ("Little Boat"). He is also known for work with Carlos Lyra, Nara Leão, Wanda Sá, Ale Vanzella, and many others. Menescal has performed in Latin music genres such as bossa nova, samba and MPB. He was nominated for a Latin Grammy for his work with his son's bossa group Bossacucanova in 2002, and received the 2013 Latin Recording Academy Special Awards in Las Vegas in November 2013.

== Career ==
In 1957, he worked as sideman for Sylvia Telles in Brazil. A year later he started a guitar school with Carlos Lyra. He formed one of the earliest bossa nova bands with Bebeto, Henrique, João Mário, and Luís Carlos Vinhas. He spread bossa nova through performances and concerts in the late 1950s and early 1960s, such as the I Festival de Samba Session. Alaíde Costa recorded Menescal's song "Jura de Pombo" in 1959. "O Barquinho" was recorded the next year by Maysa, Paulinho Nogueira, and Perry Ribeiro. He sang "O Barquinho" at Carnegie Hall in 1962 when he attended the Bossa Nova Festival with Carlos Lyra and Antonio Carlos Jobim. During the middle to late 1960s, he was an arranger and record producer for PolyGram, producing music for Maria Bethânia, Gal Costa, Gilberto Gil, Jorge Ben Jor, and Caetano Veloso. In 1970, he became the talent scout for PolyGram. He composed music for movies and television and was a sideman in the studio for Nara Leão, Elis Regina, Jair Rodrigues, and Claudette Soares. In the 1980s, he concentrated on a solo career, recording with jazz saxophonist Joe Henderson. He owns the record label Albatross.

== Discography ==
- A Bossa Nova (Elenco, 1963)
- The Boy from Ipanema Beach (Kapp, 1965)
- O Conjunto De Roberto Menescal (1969)
- Um Cantinho, Um Violão (Philips, 1985)
- Swingueira (Albatroz, 1996)
- Bossa Evergreen (Albatroz, 2000)
- Brasilidade (Six Degrees, 2001)
- Bossa Entre Amigos (Albatroz, 2003)
- Bossa Jazz Session with Eddy Palermo (Albatroz, 2003)
- Bossa Zen (Albatroz, 2003)
- Eu & Chis with Cris Delanno (Albatroz, 2003)
- Jazz Zen (Albatroz, 2004)
