= Garage house =

Subgenre of house music

- Other names: Garage; Garage music; New York house; New Jersey sound; New Jersey house
- Stylistic origins: Disco; electronic; house; soul; R&B; gospel
- Cultural origins: 1985, New York City and Newark, New Jersey, United States
- Typical instruments: Turntables; synthesizer; drum machine; sequencer; keyboards; vocals
- Derivative forms: UK garage; speed garage

Fusion genres
- Italo house

Other topics
- New Jersey sound; post-disco; Salsoul Records; deep house; acid jazz; Prelude Records; NYC and Newark music

Garage house (originally known as "garage"; local terms include "New York house" and New Jersey sound) is an electronic dance music style that was developed alongside Chicago house music. The genre was popular in the 1980s in the United States and the 1990s in the United Kingdom, where it developed into UK garage and speed garage.

== Characteristics ==
In comparison to other forms of house music, garage includes more gospel-influenced piano riffs and female vocals. It has a more soulful R&B-derived sound than Chicago house.

== History ==
Garage house was developed in the Paradise Garage nightclub in New York City and Club Zanzibar in Newark, New Jersey, United States, during the early-to-mid 1980s. There was much overlap between it and early house music, making it difficult to tell the two apart. It predates the development of Chicago house, and according to All Music, is relatively closer to disco than other dance styles. As Chicago house gained international popularity, New York's garage music scene was distinguished from the "house" umbrella.

Dance music of the 1980s made use of electronic instruments such as synthesizers, sequencers and drum machines. These instruments are an essential part of garage music. The direction of garage music was primarily influenced by the New York City discothèque Paradise Garage where the influential DJ Larry Levan, known for his musical versatility and innovation, played records.

According to Blues & Soul, contemporary garage music started with Boyd Jarvis and Levan's The Peech Boys. Jarvis, using the Visual moniker, was behind 1983 recordings "Somehow, Someway" (Prelude Records – PRL D 650) and "The Music Got Me" (Prelude Records – PRL D 650), the latter especially influential, which later was sampled by mainstream house music record producers Robert Clivillés and David Cole of C+C Music Factory.

The popularity of the genre in the UK gave birth to a derivative genre called UK garage.

== See also ==
- New Jersey sound
