= Rosinha de Valença =

Background information
- Born: Maria Rosa Canelas; July 30, 1941; Valença, Rio de Janeiro, Brazil
- Died: June 10, 2004 (aged 62) Valença, Rio de Janeiro, Brazil
- Genres: Bossa nova; MPB
- Occupations: Musician; arranger; composer
- Instrument: Acoustic guitar
- Years active: 1962–92
- Labels: Elenco; RCA; Som Livre; EMI-Odeon

Maria Rosa Canelas (July 30, 1941 – June 10, 2004), better known as Rosinha de Valença, was a Brazilian composer, arranger and musician. She is considered one of the best acoustic guitarists in Brazilian music and played with many famous artists, including Baden Powell, Sérgio Mendes, Sylvia Telles and Sivuca.

== Biography ==
Maria Rosa Canelas was born in 1941, in Valença, Rio de Janeiro, Brazil. She became interested in playing acoustic guitar as a child, after seeing her brother playing it. She taught herself by listening to music on the radio. At 12 years old, she played along with many artists from her home town, in bars and on Radio Valença. In 1960, she stopped studying to devote herself to a musical career. The first years were difficult for her as a musician. Her family did not like the idea of her playing guitar and when she started her career, there was little public recognition.

In 1963, Valença moved to Rio de Janeiro. There she met Sérgio Porto, a journalist from Rio de Janeiro. He created her artistic name, describing Canelas as playing for her whole city. So, he called her Rosinha de Valença. He introduced her to Baden Powell and Aloísio de Oliveira, a producer with Gravadora Elenco. Powell started playing with her – in the new way of playing guitar in Brazilian music. Oliveira liked her work and invited her to record an album. It was named Apresentando Rosinha de Valença and was released in that same year. After it, she was invited to play for eight months in the Bottle nightclub and to perform in TV shows and on the radio. One year later, she performed in the big show O Fino da Bossa, at the Teatro Paramount in São Paulo. She also played with Nara Leão and Quarteto em Cy.

In that same year, 1964, she travelled to the United States to play with Sérgio Mendes and Brasil '65. During this 8-month tour, Valença recorded two albums with Mendes and his band. In 1965, she travelled to Europe as soloist with a Brazilian group. This band visited and performed in 24 countries in Europe and Japan. In 1968, Valença travelled again for a long tour which ended in 1971, when she came back to Brazil. During these years, Valença visited USSR, Israel, Switzerland, Italy, Portugal, and some African countries. She also played with Stan Getz, Sarah Vaughan and Henry Mancini.

Back in Brazil, she played with Martinho da Vila, contributing to four of his albums. In 1974, after another tour abroad, Valença organized her own band, which was composed of famous artists, such as João Donato, Copinha, Ivone Lara and Miúcha. In 1977, she performed with Sivuca, recording a live album with him, name Sivuca e Rosinha de Valença ao vivo. Another notable album was with Waltel Blanco, Violões em dois estilos, released in 1980.

Valença's musical career was ended prematurely in 1992 due to health problems: she suffered brain damage due to a heart attack. She died of respiratory failure in 2004, in her hometown, after 12 years in a vegetative state.

== Legacy ==
After Valença went into a coma, many artists recorded her songs as tribute to her.

In 2000, Valença was honored by a benefit concert, organized by Jalusa Barcellos, member of Secretaria Estadual de Cultura, and presented by Sérgio Cabral. This event was named Uma noite para Rosinha (One night for Rosinha), with Haroldo Costa as general director, and Jorge Simas as musical director. Among the many contributing notable artists were Beth Carvalho, Dona Ivone Lara, Francis Hime, Olívia Hime, João Nogueira, Joyce, Leci Brandão, Miúcha, MPB-4, Paulinho da Viola and Quarteto em Cy.

After Valença's death, Maria Bethânia produced the album Namorando a Rosa, co-produced by Miúcha. The album was contributed to by many friends and professional fellows of Valença: Martinho da Vila, Ivone Lara, Alcione, Miúcha, Caetano Veloso, Chico Buarque, Joanna, Bebel Gilberto, Hermeto Pascoal, Turíbio Santos and Yamandu Costa. Each artist recorded a song composed by Valença, and recalled their relationship with the guitarist.

Valença's songs have been covered by Martinho da Vila, Joanna, Zezé Motta, Rui Maurity, Tito Madi, Nana Caymmi, César Camargo Mariano, Wanderléa, Leci Brandão, Maria Bethânia and Paulinho Nogueira.Her version of George Gershwin's "Summertime" was used as a sample by the rapper Tyler, the Creator on the track "Tomorrow", from the album Chromakopia.

== Discography ==
=== Studio albums ===
- 1964: Apresentando Rosinha de Valença (Elenco)
- 1970: Rosinha de Valença apresenta Ipanema Beat (RCA Victor)
- 1971: Um violão em primeiro plano (RCA Victor)
- 1973: Rosinha de Valença (Som Livre)
- 1976: Cheiro de Mato' (Odean)
- 1980: Violões em dois estilos (Som Livre), with Waltel Branco
- 1990: Rosinha de Valença & Flavio Faria (feat. Toots Thielemans; Iris Music)

=== Live albums ===
- 1966: Rosinha de Valença ao vivo (Forma)
- 1975: Rosinha de Valença e banda ao vivo (Odeon)
- 1977: Sivuca e Rosinha de Valença ao vivo (RCA Pure Gold), with Sivuca

=== As contributor ===
- 1965: Bud Shank & His Brazilian Friends (Pacific Jazz) by Bud Shank, with João Donato
- 1965: Brasil 65 (Capitol), by Wanda de Sah featuring Sérgio Mendes Trio
- 1965: In person at El Matador (Atlantic), by Sérgio Mendes and Brasil '65
