= Newton Mendonça =

Brazilian musician, composer and lyricist (1921–1960)

Newton Ferreira de Mendonça (February 14, 1921 – November 22, 1960) was a musician, composer, and lyricist. He began as a pianist in 1950.

Mendonça was born in Rio de Janeiro. In 1953 he started working with Antônio Carlos Jobim, something for which he is best known. Mendonça went on to co-compose music and lyrics for Desafinado, Meditação, and Samba de uma nota só. In 1959 he had his first heart attack, but his songs continued gaining attention. In 1960 his second heart attack proved fatal.

== Bibliography ==
- De Stefano, Gildo, Il popolo del samba, La vicenda e i protagonisti della storia della musica popolare brasiliana, Preface by Chico Buarque de Hollanda, Introduction by Gianni Minà, RAI-ERI, Rome 2005, ISBN 8839713484
- De Stefano, Gildo, Saudade Bossa Nova: musiche, contaminazioni e ritmi del Brasile, Preface by Chico Buarque, Introduction by Gianni Minà, Logisma Editore, Florence 2017, ISBN 978-88-97530-88-6
