= En La Fusa con Maria Creuza y Toquinho =

1970 live album by Vinícius de Moraes & Toquinho

Live album by Vinícius de Moraes & Toquinho
- Released: 1970
- Recorded: Estudios ION and La Fusa, Buenos Aires
- Studio: Estudios ION
- Genres: Bossa nova, MPB
- Label: Diorama
- Producer: Alfredo Radoszynski

Vinícius de Moraes & Toquinho chronology
Vinícius em Portugal (1969)	En La Fusa con Maria Creuza y Toquinho (1970)	Como Dizia O Poeta... (1971)

En La Fusa con Maria Creuza y Toquinho (also known as Grabado en Buenos Aires con Maria Creuza y Toquinho) is a 1970 album by Vinicius de Moraes in partnership with Maria Creuza and Toquinho. It was recorded before a studio audience at Estudios ION in Buenos Aires in July 1970. The recording was inspired by a June 1970 engagement at the La Fusa Bar in Buenos Aires. Applause and ambience from La Fusa was mixed into the studio recordings, together with the live studio audience sounds.

== Track listing ==
1. Copa do mundo (Maugeri, Müller, Sobrinho e Dagô) - 01:12
2. A felicidade (Vinicius de Moraes / Antonio Carlos Jobim) - 03:27
3. Tomara (Vinicius de Moraes) - 04:17
4. Que maravilha (Jorge Ben / Toquinho)- 02:28
5. Lamento no morro (Vinicius de Moraes / Antonio Carlos Jobim) - 02:24
6. Berimbau / Consolação (Vinicius de Moraes / Baden Powell) - 02:46
7. Irene (Caetano Veloso) - 02:33
8. Canto de Ossanha (Vinicius de Moraes / Baden Powell) - 03:05
9. Garota de Ipanema (Vinicius de Moraes / Antonio Carlos Jobim) - 02:23
10. Samba em prelúdio (Vinicius de Moraes / Baden Powell) - 03:49
11. Catendé (Antônio Carlos & Jocáfi / Ildásio Tavares) - 05:10
12. Valsa da Tunisia (Vinicius de Moraes) - 03:08
13. Eu sei que vou te amar (Vinicius de Moraes / Antonio Carlos Jobim) - 03:28
14. Minha namorada (Vinicius de Moraes / Carlos Lyra) - 03:57
15. Se todos fossem iguais a você (Vinicius de Moraes / Antonio Carlos Jobim)- 02:57

== Personnel ==
- Vinícius de Moraes - lyrics
- Maria Creuza – vocals
- Toquinho – arrangements, vocals, guitar
- Enrique Roizner - drums
