= Maria Creuza =

Brazilian singer

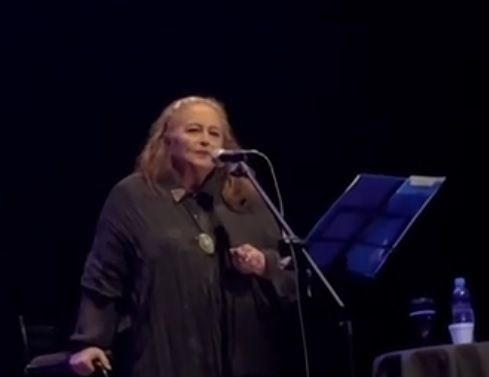
- Creuza in 2024

Background information
- Born: Maria Creuza Silva Lima; 26 February 1944 (age 82); Esplanada, Bahia, Brazil
- Genres: MPB; Bossa nova
- Occupation: Singer
- Instrument: Vocals
- Years active: 1966–present
- Labels: Som Livre; BMG; RCA
- Spouse(s): Antônio Carlos Marques Pinto (divorced); Victor Díaz Vélez

Maria Creuza Silva Lima (born 26 February 1944), commonly known as Maria Creuza, is a Brazilian singer. She is best known for her collaboration with Vinicius de Moraes and Toquinho.

== Early life ==
Maria Creuza was born on 26 February 1944 in Esplanada, Bahia, Brazil. Her mother was a seamstress who owned a workshop with a friend. At the age of two, her parents separated, and she moved with her mother to Salvador.

Her mother's love for singing inspired Creuza to become a singer. When she was 15 years old, she joined a group called Les Girls as a crooner. Due to her participation in Les Girls, she was invited to perform on radio programs in Salvador. Creuza then hosted a program called Encontro com Maria Creuza on TV Itapoan for four years. During this time, she made her first recordings in English with a local record label.

== Career ==
=== Early career ===
In 1965, Creuza met Antônio Carlos Marques Pinto. She, along with Pinto, participated in the 1966 Festival Brasil Canta music competition, performing his song "Se não houvesse Maria". In 1967, they took part in the third Festival de Música Popular Brasileira with Pinto's song "Festa no terreiro de Alaketu". They recorded a single with the song "Abolição" the same year.

In 1969, Creuza won the best performer prize and took third place overall in the fourth Festival Universitário da Canção Popular with the song "Mirante" by Aldir Blanc and César Costa Filho. The same year, she performed "Catendê" by the newly-formed music duo of Antônio Carlos Marques Pinto and João Carlos Figueiredo (Jocafi) in the fifth Festival da Música Popular Brasileira.

=== Collaboration with Vinicius de Moraes ===
Creuza's performance in the Festival Universitário da Canção Popular caught the attention of the renowned poet and songwriter Vinicius de Moraes, who was captivated by her velvety and deep voice. De Moraes invited her on a tour in Argentina and Uruguay with Dori Caymmi, which she accepted.

During the tour, Creuza, along with de Moraes and Toquinho, who substituted for Caymmi, recorded the album En La Fusa con Maria Creuza y Toquinho at the Estudios ION in Buenos Aires in July 1970. En La Fusa was successful enough that a follow-up album, with Maria Bethânia in place of Creuza, was recorded the following year. In 2004, En La Fusa con Maria Creuza y Toquinho received the gold certification from the Argentine Chamber of Phonograms and Videograms Producers.

Creuza continued to collaborate with de Moraes and Toquinho until de Moraes's death in 1980. They toured extensively, mainly around South America and Europe. In 1972, they collaborated on the album Eu sei que vou te amar, a Brazilian version of the La Fusa set.

=== Solo career ===
In 1971, Creuza recorded the album Yo… Maria Creuza, featuring songs by Jorge Ben, Tom Jobim, Vinicius de Moraes, and Dorival Caymmi. She then recorded the albums Maria Creuza and Voce Abusou in 1972. The next year, she released Eu disse adeus, which was also recorded in Spanish for the European audience.

In 1974, Creuza released the album Sessão Nostalgia. The same year, she took part in the second World Popular Song Festival in Tokyo, winning second place with the song "Que diacho de dor" by Pinto and Jocafi.

Creuza continued to record albums through the late 1970s, including Maria Creuza e os grandes mestres do samba (1975), Meia Noite (1977), Doce veneno (1978), and Pecado (1979). In 1977, she contributed to the soundtrack of the movie Os Pastores da Noite.

In the 1980s, Creuza released the albums Maria Creuza (1980), Sedução (1981), Poético (1982), dedicated to Vinicius de Moraes, Paixão acesa (1985), Pura magia (1987), Da cor do pecado (1989), and Com Açúcar E Com Afeto (1989).

In 1991, she released the album Todo sentimento. In 1993, she and Carlos Lyra recorded the song "Samba da Benção" for the album Vinicius de Moraes Songbook Vol. 1, part of a three-volume series of works by de Moraes covered by various interpreters.

In 1998, Creuza was part of the group of singers who performed 14 songs of the century as selected by critics from Rio de Janeiro and São Paulo in a concert to celebrate the centenary of the Brazilian Academy of Letters.

=== Later career ===
In 2003, Creuza released Você e eu, consisting of interpretations of works by de Moraes, and in 2006 Maria Creuza ao vivo.

Creuza, along with Toquinho, performed at the 2016 Byblos International Festival in Lebanon.

She has been performing regularly at the Vinicius Bar in Rio de Janeiro, along with shows in Europe.

== Personal life ==
Creuza was married to the musician Antônio Carlos Marques Pinto for 17 years. They had three children. She later married her current husband, the Argentinian pianist Victor Díaz Vélez.

== Discography ==
1970s

- 1970: En La Fusa con Maria Creuza y Toquinho, with Vinicius de Moraes and Toquinho
- 1971: Yo… Maria Creuza
- 1972: Eu sei que vou te amar, with de Moraes and Toquinho
- 1972: Maria Creuza
- 1972: Voce Abusou
- 1974: Sessão Nostalgia
- 1975: Maria Creuza e os grandes mestres do samba (RCA)
- 1977: Meia Noite
- 1977: Os Pastores da Noite, with Antônio Carlos & Jocáfi, the soundtrack for the movie of the same name
- 1978: Doce veneno
- 1979: Pecado

1980s

- 1980: Maria Creuza
- 1981: Sedução (RCA)
- 1982: Poético
- 1985: Paixão acesa (Arca)
- 1987: Pura magia
- 1989: Da cor do pecado (Som Livre)
- 1989: Com Açúcar E Com Afeto

1990s

- 1991: Todo sentimento (Jazzmania)
- 1993: Vinicius de Moraes Songbook Vol. 1 with Carlos Lyra for the song "Samba da Benção"

2000s

- 2003: Você e eu
- 2006: Maria Creuza ao vivo
