= André (footballer, born 2001) =

Brazilian footballer

- André with Wolverhampton Wanderers in 2025

Personal information
- Full name: André Trindade da Costa Neto
- Date of birth: 16 July 2001 (age 25)
- Place of birth: Ibirataia, Bahia, Brazil
- Height: 1.76 m (5 ft 9 in)
- Position: Defensive midfielder

Team information
- Current team: Wolverhampton Wanderers
- Number: 7

Youth career
- 2013–2020: Fluminense

Senior career*
Years	Team	Apps	(Gls)
2020–2024	Fluminense	147	(3)
2024–	Wolverhampton Wanderers	81	(1)

International career^{‡}
2023–	Brazil	13	(0)
- * Club domestic league appearances and goals as of 23:18, 31 October 2026 (UTC) ‡ National team caps and goals as of 10 October 2025

André Trindade da Costa Neto (born 16 July 2001), simply known as André (Brazilian Portuguese: [ɐ̃ˈdɾɛ]), is a Brazilian professional footballer who plays as a defensive midfielder for EFL Championship club Wolverhampton Wanderers and the Brazil national team.

== Club career ==
=== Fluminense ===
Born in Algodão, Ibirataia, Bahia, André joined Fluminense's youth setup in 2013, aged 12. On 21 February 2020, he renewed his contract with the club until 2023.

André made his professional debut on 16 September 2020, coming on as a late substitute for Dodi in a 1–0 home win over Atlético Goianiense, for the year's Copa do Brasil. His first Série A occurred four days later, as he started in a 1–0 away loss against Sport Recife.

André scored his first professional goal on 4 July 2021, netting a last-minute winner in a 1–0 away success over rivals Flamengo. On 4 October, he further extended his contract until the end of 2024. André, 21, completed his hundredth game for the Laranjeiras club, on 1 October 2022, against Atletico-MG, in Mineirão.

On 24 August 2023, he scored the first goal in a 2–0 win over Olimpia in his 150th match with Fluminense during the Copa Libertadores quarter-finals. Later that year, on 4 November, he started in the Copa Libertadores final with Fluminense against Boca Juniors, which ended in a 2–1 victory after extra time, to be his club's first title in that competition.

=== Wolverhampton Wanderers ===
==== 2024–25 ====
On 30 August 2024, just before the transfer window closed, André joined Premier League club Wolverhampton Wanderers. He was given the squad number 7, the same number he had worn at Fluminense. André's debut for Wolverhampton Wanderers came in a 1–1 draw against Nottingham Forest at the City Ground on 31 August. André came on in the 86th minute, replacing the Norwegian starter Jørgen Strand Larsen.

He finished his first season with 32 appearances, 26 of them as a starter.

==== 2025–26 ====
He scored his first goal for Wolverhampton Wanderers on 3 March 2026 as the winner in the 2–1 victory against Liverpool.

== International career ==
André was included in the 55-man preliminary squad of Brazil by coach Tite for the 2022 FIFA World Cup. On 20 June 2023, he made his international debut, coming off the bench in the 74th minute to substitute Lucas Paquetá, in a 4–2 defeat in a friendly match against Senegal.

== Career statistics ==
=== Club ===
As of match played 31 October 2026

Appearances and goals by club, season and competition
Club	Season	League			State league (Note: Includes Campeonato Carioca)		National cup (Note: Includes Copa do Brasil, FA Cup)		League cup (Note: Includes EFL Cup)		Continental		Other		Total	
Club	Season	Division	Apps	Goals	Apps	Goals	Apps	Goals	Apps	Goals	Apps	Goals	Apps	Goals	Apps	Goals
Fluminense	2020	Série A	10	0	0	0	1	0	—		0	0	—		11	0
Fluminense	2021	Série A	26	1	4	0	2	0	—		4 (Note: Appearances in Copa Libertadores)	0	—		36	1
Fluminense	2022	Série A	34	1	11	1	7	0	—		9	0	—		61	2
Fluminense	2023	Série A	31	0	12	0	4	0	—		13	1	2 (Note: Appearances in FIFA Club World Cup)	0	62	1
Fluminense	2024	Série A	12	0	7	0	1	0	—		5	0	2 (Note: Appearances in Recopa Sudamericana)	0	27	0
Fluminense	Total		113	2	34	1	15	0	—		31	1	4	0	197	4
Wolverhampton Wanderers	2024–25	Premier League	33	0	—		3	0	0	0	—		—		36	0
Wolverhampton Wanderers	2025–26	Premier League	35	1	—		2	0	2	0	—		—		39	1
Wolverhampton Wanderers	2026–27	Championship	13	0	—		0	0	1	1	—		—		14	1
Wolverhampton Wanderers	Total		81	1	—		5	0	3	1	—		—		89	2
Career total			194	3	34	1	20	0	3	1	31	1	4	0	286	6

=== International ===
As of match played 10 October 2025

Appearances and goals by national team and year
National team	Year	Apps	Goals
Brazil	2023	4	0
Brazil	2024	6	0
Brazil	2025	3	0
Total		13	0

== Honours ==
Fluminense

- Copa Libertadores: 2023
- Recopa Sudamericana: 2024
- Taça Guanabara: 2022, 2023
- Campeonato Carioca: 2022, 2023

Individual

- Campeonato Brasileiro Série A Best Newcomer: 2021
- Bola de Prata: 2022
- Campeonato Brasileiro Série A Team of the Year: 2022
- Best Defensive Midfielder in Brazil: 2022
- Campeonato Carioca Team of the Year: 2023
- Copa Libertadores Team of the Year: 2023
- El País America's Team of the Year: 2023
