= Elenco =

Brazilian record label

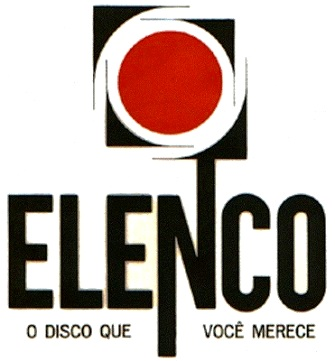
- Industry: Music & entertainment
- Founded: 1963 by Aloysio de Oliveira
- Headquarters: Brazil

Elenco is a Brazilian record label established in 1963 by Aloysio de Oliveira. It was a major factor in the development of the bossa nova style, also releasing samba, jazz, and spoken word recordings. It is often considered one of the most influential labels in the bossa nova and MPB genres.

== Overview ==
Producer Aloysio de Oliveira, a key figure in the internationalization of Brazilian popular music, founded Elenco in 1963. While the label is renowned for its output of bossa nova, Elenco's first releases were early MPB and Latin jazz, reflecting the tastes of its founder, who was also a musician.

Musicians such as Baden Powell de Aquino (commonly known as Baden Powell), Astrud Gilberto, Antonio Carlos Jobim, Maysa, Lúcio Alves, and Sylvia Telles recorded stellar albums for Elenco, which are today considered masterpieces of their genres. The most significant records were released between 1963 and 1968 and are instantly recognizable by their minimalistic sleeve artwork, designed by Brazilian photographer Chico Vilella, which often consists of a monochrome photograph or painting scattered with small red dots. According to critics such as Zuza Homem de Mello and Ruy Castro, the characteristic Elenco sleeve designs were heavily inspired by jazz labels such as Blue Note.

These records are also noteworthy for the high-quality recording techniques used at RioSom studios in Rio de Janeiro by engineer Norman Sternberg. In the beginning, Elenco was a small label, based in Rio de Janeiro. During the mid-1960s a number of factors, including problematic distribution, caused the label to slide into insolvency; it was purchased by Companhia Brasileira de Discos in 1968.

Many Elenco records have been reissued on CD, most notably in Japan. LPs are harder to find and are considered today to be highly priced collector's items.

Other artists who recorded for Elenco

Edu Lobo, Nara Leão, Vinícius de Moraes, Maria Bethânia, Dorival Caymmi, Sérgio Mendes, Roberto Menescal, Tamba Trio, Odette Lara, Sérgio Ricardo, Aracy de Almeida, Sidney Miller, Ciro Monteiro, Quarteto Em Cy, Rosinha de Valença and Lennie Dale.

== See also ==
- List of record labels
