= Rosinha de Valença (album) =

Studio album by Rosinha de Valença
- Released: 1973
- Genre: MPB, Bossa nova
- Length: 41:01
- Label: Som Livre
- Producer: João Melo

Rosinha de Valença is a 1973 album recorded by the Brazilian musician Rosinha de Valença. Produced by João Melo, this album was released simultaneously in Brazil, for Som Livre, and in France, for Barclay. The album includes famous Brazilian popular songs, such as "Asa branca", by Luiz Gonzaga and Humberto Teixeira, "Valsa de Eurídice", by Vinicius de Moraes, and "Morena do mar", by Dorival Caymmi.

After a long period of neglect, this album was reissued on CD in 2002, as one of the works included in Som Livre Master series, organized by Charles Gavin.

== Track listing ==
No.	Title	Writer(s)	Length
1.	"Caboclo Ubiratan"	Public domain, adapted by Rosinha de Valença	4:37
2.	"Valsa de Eurídice"	Vinicius de Moraes	3:44
3.	"Bala com bala"	Aldir Blanc, João Bosco	4:39
4.	"After sunrise"	Oscar Castro Neves, Tião Neves	3:04
5.	"Asa branca"	Luiz Gonzaga, Humberto Teixeira	3:55
6.	"Araponga"	Rosinha de Valença	7:02
7.	"Xaxado pra espantar tristeza"	Marília Medalha	3:22
8.	"Cuíca"	Rosinha de Valença	5:35
9.	"Porto das flores"	Rosinha de Valença	2:00
10.	"Morena do mar"	Dorival Caymmi	2:59

== Personnel ==
- Rosinha de Valença: acoustic guitar

The band who plays in this album is unknown. There is no information about the musicians who joined Rosinha de Valença's band.
