= Um Violão em Primeiro Plano =

1971 album by Rosinha de Valença

Studio album by Rosinha de Valença
- Released: 1971
- Length: 32:31
- Label: RCA Victor
- Producer: Luís Vagner; João Costa Netto

Rosinha de Valença chronology
| Rosinha Apresenta Ipanema Beat (1970) | Um Violão em Primeiro Plano (1971) | Rosinha de Valença (1973) |

Um Violão em Primeiro Plano is the third album by Brazilian artist Rosinha de Valença, released by RCA Victor in 1971.

== Background ==
Released in 1971 by the artist Rosinha de Valença, the album Um violão em primeiro plano is the Rio de Janeiro-based singer’s third album. Produced by Luís Vagner and João Costa Netto, the album was distributed by RCA Victor. Among the songs recorded by Rosinha on the album were compositions by Brazilian musicians, including Caetano Veloso, Dorival Caymmi, Luiz Gonzaga, Antônio Carlos & Jocáfi, Edu Lobo, and Gilberto Gil, as well as Americans George Gershwin, Ira Gershwin, and DuBose Heyward. Only the song Tema Espanhol was written by Rosinha.

In an interview with Jornal do Brasil about the album’s production, she said, “I’m going to make this album using only the acoustic guitar. With backing, but only the acoustic guitar.”

== Tracks ==
Faixas
| No. | Title | Music | Length |
|---|---|---|---|
| 1. | "Asa Branca" | Luiz Gonzaga, Humberto Teixeira | 4:13 |
| 2. | "London, London" | Caetano Veloso | 2:45 |
| 3. | "Mudei de Idéia" | Antônio Carlos, Jocáfi | 2:05 |
| 4. | "Zanzibar" | Edu Lobo | 2:16 |
| 5. | "Boi Ta-Tá" | Messias dos Santos, Eugênio Malta | 2:27 |
| 6. | "Marinheiro Só" | Caetano Veloso | 2:38 |
| 7. | "Summertime" | George Gershwin, Ira Gershwin, DuBose Heyward | 3:03 |
| 8. | "De Conversa em Conversa" | Lúcio Alves, Haroldo Barbosa | 1:54 |
| 9. | "One O'Clock Last Morning, 20th April 1970" | Gilberto Gil | 2:39 |
| 10. | "O Samba da Minha Terra" | Dorival Caymmi | 2:14 |
| 11. | "Concierto de Aranjuez" | Joaquín Rodrigo | 2:46 |
| 12. | "Tema Espanhol" | Rosinha de Valença, Celinho | 3:29 |
| Total length: | | | 32:31 |

== Release ==
The album was released on vinyl by RCA Victor in 1971. In 2004, a new CD edition was released under the supervision of musician Charles Gavin, distributed by BMG Brasil. In 2021, the Rio de Janeiro-based label Rocinante released a new vinyl edition of the album in honor of the 80th anniversary of Rosinha’s birth.

== Legacy ==
In 2021, journalist and music critic Mauro Ferreira, in his blog on G1, described the album as “one of the most significant releases in the artist's discography.” In a poll conducted in May 2022, the album ranked 254th on a list of the 500 best Brazilian albums, according to a survey of more than 160 music experts conducted by the Discoteca Básica podcast. It was the only album by Rosinha to be mentioned in the poll.

== Personnel ==
The following musicians contributed to the album:

- Rosinha de Valença: acoustic guitar, voice;
- Martinho da Vila: vocals (track 6).
