= Baden Powell (guitarist) =

Brazilian guitarist

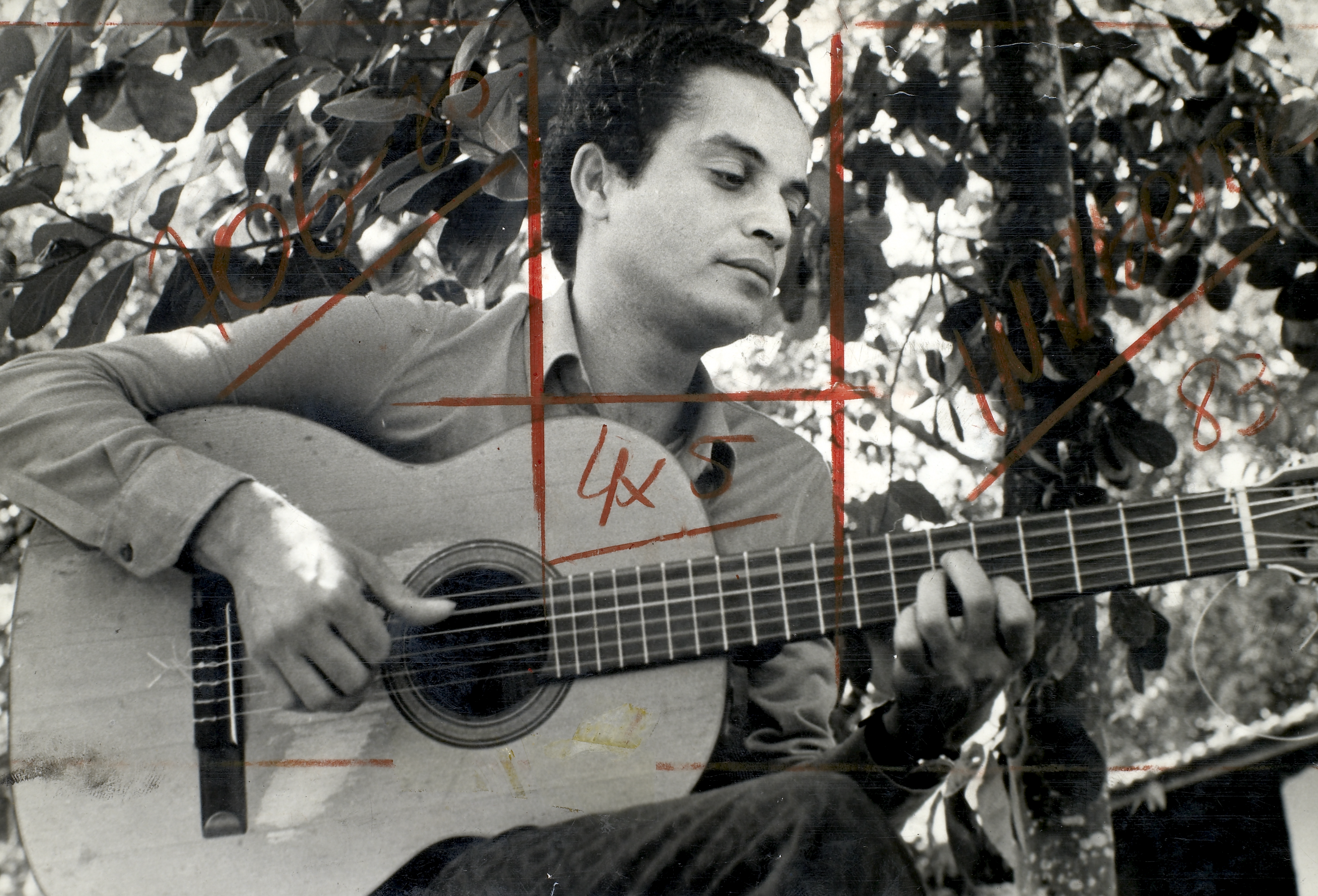

Background information
- Born: August 6, 1937; Varre-Sai, Rio de Janeiro, Brazil
- Died: September 26, 2000 (aged 63) Rio de Janeiro, Brazil
- Genres: Brazilian jazz, bossa nova
- Occupation: Musician
- Instrument: Guitar
- Years active: 1950s–1990s

Baden Powell de Aquino (Brazilian Portuguese: [ˈbadẽ ˈpawew]; 6 August 1937 – 26 September 2000), known professionally as Baden Powell, was a Brazilian virtuoso guitarist and composer. He combined classical techniques with popular harmony and swing. He performed in many styles, including bossa nova, samba, Brazilian jazz, Latin jazz and MPB. He performed on stage during most of his lifetime. Powell composed many pieces for guitar, some of them now considered guitar standards, such as Abração em Madrid, Braziliense, Canto de Ossanha, Casa Velha, Consolação, Horizon, Imagem, Lotus, Samba, Samba em Prelúdio, Samba Triste, Simplesmente, Tristeza e Solidão, and Samba da Benção. He released Os Afro-sambas, a watershed album in MPB, with Vinicius de Moraes in 1966. He is widely regarded as one of the greatest Brazilian guitar players of all time.

== Biography ==
Baden Powell de Aquino was born in Varre-Sai in Rio de Janeiro, Brazil. His father, a Scouting enthusiast, named him after Robert Baden-Powell. When he was three months old, his family relocated to the Rio suburb of São Cristóvão. His house was a stop for popular musicians during his formative years. He started guitar lessons with Jayme Florence, a famous choro guitarist in the 1940s. He soon proved a young virtuoso, having won many talent competitions before he was a teenager. At age fifteen, he was playing professionally, accompanying singers and bands in various styles. He was fascinated by swing and jazz, but his main influences were in the Brazilian guitar canon.

In 1955, Powell played with the Steve Bernard Orquestra at the Boite Plaza, a nightclub within the Plaza Hotel in Rio, where his skill got the attention of the jazz trio playing across the lobby at the Plaza Bar. When Ed Lincoln needed to form a new trio, he asked Powell to join on guitar to become the Hotel Plaza Trio. Powell brought in Luiz Marinho on bass and a fourth member of the "trio": Claudette Soares on vocals. Powell, Lincoln, and their young musician friends took part in after-hours jam sessions, gaining notice in the growing Brazilian jazz scene.

Powell achieved wider fame in 1959 by convincing Billy Blanco, an established singer and songwriter, to put lyrics to one of Baden's compositions. The result was called "Samba Triste" and quickly became very successful. It has been covered by many artists, including Stan Getz and Charlie Byrd in their seminal LP Jazz Samba.

In 1962, Powell met the poet-diplomat Vinicius de Moraes and began a collaboration that yielded classics of 1960s Brazilian music. Although bossa nova was the prevailing sound at the time, Baden and Vinicius wanted to combine samba with Afro-Brazilian forms such as candomblé, umbanda, and capoeira. In 1966 they released Os Afro-Sambas de Baden e Vinicius.

Powell studied advanced harmony with Moacir Santos and released recordings on the Brazilian labels Elenco Records and Forma, as well as in the French label Barclay and the German label MPS/Saba (notably, his 1966 Tristeza on Guitar). He was the house guitarist for Elenco, and of the singer Elis Regina's TV show O Fino da Bossa.

In 1968, Powell joined with poet Paulo César Pinheiro and produced another series of Afro-Brazilian-inspired music, released in 1970 as Os Cantores da Lapinha.

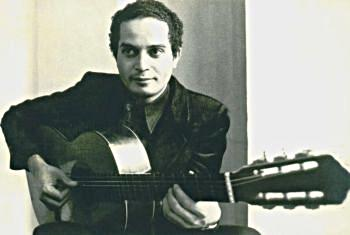
Baden Powell in 1971

Powell visited and toured Europe frequently in the 1960s, relocating permanently to France in 1968.

In the 1970s, he released recordings with labels in Europe and Brazil. In 1981, he performed on the stage of Palais des glaces in Paris as guitarist and singer for four weeks. However, he had health problems and spent the 1980s in semi-retirement in France and Germany. In the 1990s he and his family moved back to Brazil, where he continued to record and perform. Public recognition of his work came around that time in Brazil.

By the end of the 1990s he had converted to evangelical Christianity, to which he credits with helping him overcome his long addictions to alcohol and tobacco. He fell terminally ill in 2000 and died of general infection triggered by a bacterial pneumonia on 26 September 2000, in Rio de Janeiro.

== Playing style ==
Baden Powell decided at age 19 to stop playing the electric guitar, preferring to concentrate on the classical guitar for the rest of his career. He did record a series of albums with a borrowed steel-string acoustic, but that is as far as he strayed from his main instrument in his adulthood.

An analysis of his repertoire reveals a wide range of interests. It spanned all the idioms of Brazilian popular music of the 20th century: samba, bossa nova, Afro-bahian ritual music, frevo, choro, and North Eastern Sertão music, and even European and Japanese lullabies. Like most musicians growing up in the 1940s and 1950s, he was deeply influenced by jazz, especially bebop and swing. He covered Thelonious Monk's "Round Midnight" on two recordings, and Jerome Kern's "All the Things You Are" on three occasions (including his first solo album).

This upbringing is reflected in his playing style, which shows a fusion of jazz harmonies and classical guitar technique, with a very Brazilian right hand (the one carrying the rhythm on the guitar). In solo classical music, he was proficient in the works of Tárrega and Bach. When playing in a group, he was able to accompany singers with quiet mastery, or let loose and play street samba in sloppy "party" style as if the guitar was another percussion instrument. Like Monk, he was fond of the minor second interval as a way to "bend" the tonality. However, because of his jazz background, he would rarely physically bend the string, preferring instead to play the minor second using an adjacent open string. Students of his style should note this preference for chord voicings that feature extensions on the open strings as a way of punctuating passages. Other idioms to watch for are the endless variations in rhythm played by the right hand, always within the proper 2/4 samba meter, as well as his tendency to put his "signature" in a fast descending scale with a (slower) ascending arpeggio in the relative key. He also used vocalise and scat singing, often in unison with the melody line (especially when the melody was sung on the bass strings of the guitar).

His influences were his first teacher "Meira" (Jayme Florence, 1909–1982), Dilermando Reis (1916–1977), and Garoto (Anibal Augusto Sardinha, 1915–1955). He also commented about being influenced by the work of Les Paul (1915–2009), Django Reinhardt (1910–1953), and Jacques Loussier (1934–2019).

== Discography ==
Baden Powell first appeared as accompanist on a few big band and samba recordings from the 1950s. He recorded his first solo album in 1959, but it was released in 1961. His first and second albums contain jazz standards, Brazilian popular music of the time, and original compositions. In 1962, he recorded with flautist Herbie Mann and drummer Jimmy Pratt. In 1963 he led small ensembles in Brazil and France. The French labels Barclay and Festival released many of his recordings. In Germany, MPS/Saba released his work with producer Joachim Berendt. In Brazil, he recorded for Elenco Records, Forma, and the Brazilian subsidiary of Philips Records. After a few new releases in the 1980s, Powell returned to recording studios in Brazil for his final years. His later recordings consist of solo guitar or voice and guitar.

=== Albums ===
Title	Release	Label	Notes
Apresentando Baden Powell e Seu Violão	1961	Philips (Br)	with Carlos Monteiro de Souza and his orchestra. Produced by Baden Powell
Um Violão na Madrugada	1961	Philips	with Carlos Monteiro de Souza and his orchestra. Produced by Armando Pittigliani
Baden Powell Swings with Jimmy Pratt	1963	Elenco	with band directed by Jimmy Pratt on drums. Produced by Aloysio de Oliveira
À Vontade	1963	Elenco (Br)	with flute, drums and percussion. Produced by Oliveira
Le Monde Musical de Baden Powell, also released as Fresh Winds	1964	Barclay (F), United Artists (US)	with trio and orchestra dir. by Paul Mauriat, recorded in Paris. Produced by Jacques Lubin
Billy Nencioli + Baden Powell	1965	Barclay/PolyGram	French singer Nencioli with band and strings feat. Powell. Music by Powell
Os Afro Sambas de Baden e Vinicius	1966	Forma (Br)	with Vinícius de Moraes, Quarteto em Cy, horns and percussion. Produced by Roberto Quartin and Wadi Gebara Netto
Tempo Feliz	1966	Forma/Polygram	with trio feat. Mauricio Einhorn on harmonica. Produced by Quartin and Gebara Netto
Ao Vivo no Teatro Santa Rosa	1966	Elenco	live, with trio feat. Oscar Castro-Neves on piano. Produced by Oliveira
Tristeza on Guitar	1966	MPS/Saba	solo and with trio. Powell uses guitar overdubs. Produced by Joachim-Ernst Berendt and Gebara Netto
O Som de Baden Powell	1968	Elenco	with Copinha on flute and rhythm section. Produced by Berendt & Gebara Netto
Os Originais do Samba - Show / Recital	1968	Philips	live, with trio, singer Márcia and Originais do Samba
Poema on Guitar	1968	MPS/Saba	quartet with Eberhard Weber, Charly Antolini and flutist Sidney Smith. Produced by Berendt
27 Horas de Estúdio, also re-rel. as Aquarelles du Bresil	1969	Elenco	solo, with trio and string section. Produced by João Mello
Le Monde Musical de Baden Powell, Vol. 2	1969	Barclay	arranged and conducted by trumpeter Ivan Jullien. Musical direction and production by Lubin
Os Cantores da Lapinha (As Musicas de Baden Powell e Paulo Cesar Pinheiro)	1970	Elenco	
Baden Powell Quartet, Vols. 1-3	1970	Barclay	compilation, 3-LP boxed set
Live in Japan, also re-rel. as Face au Public and Gravado ao vivo em Paris	1971	Barclay	live, with trio
Canto on Guitar	1971	MPS/Saba	with trio
Estudos	1971	Elenco, MPS/BASF	
Solitude on Guitar	1971	CBS (G)	
É de Lei	1972	Philips	
Images on Guitar	1973	MPS/BASF, Canyon (Jp)	live
L'Âme de Baden Powell	1973	Festival (F), Imagem (Br)	with trio and singer Janine de Waleyne
La Grande Réunion	1974	Festival	with Stéphane Grappelli
Grandezza on Guitar	1974	CBS (Nl)	with Herb Geller and Eberhard Weber
Estudos	1974	MPS/Saba	
Apaixonado	1975	MPS/Saba	
Baden Powell + Cordes - Mélancolie	1975	Festival	with Janine de Waleyne and string section
Baden Powell canta Vinicius de Moraes e Paolo Cesar Pinheiro	1977	Festival	
Baden Powell	1978	Musidisc (F)	compilation, 4-LP set, with trio and Janine de Waleyne
Nosso Baden, also re-rel. asSimplesmente	1980	Atlantic/WEA (Br)	with percussion group Originais do Samba
De Baden para Vinicius	1981	WEA	live
Felicidades, also re-rel. as Live in Hamburg and Felicidade	1983	Pläne (G), Iris/Kardum (F)	live
Violão em Brasileira re-rel. as Rio das Valsas and Seresta Brasileira	1988	Idéia Livre (Br), Caju (Br/Jp), JSL (F), Milestone (US) et al.	
At the Rio Jazz Club	1990	Caju	live
Os Afro Sambas	1990	Banco BMC (Br)	re-recording of the 1966 album, again with Quarteto em Cy, lead vocals by Powell
The Frankfurt Opera Concert 1975	1992	Tropical Music (G/Jp)	live, with trio
Three Originals	1993	MPS/Polygram	compilation
Live in Rio	1994	Kuarup (Br)	live, trio with his sons
Décembre 94 de Rio à Paris	1995	Frémeaux & Associés (F)	
Live in Montreux, 22 Juillet 1995	1996	Frémeaux & Associés	live
Baden Live à Bruxelles	1999	Lua (Br), Sunnyside (US)	live
Lembranças	2000	Trama (Br)	solo with occ. perc and flute
Baden Powell de Aquino	2001	Iris	compilation, 2-CDs plus CD-ROM
O Universo Musical de Baden Powell	2002	Universal, Sunnyside	compilation, 2-CD set with recordings from 1964-1977
Samba in Prelúdio - Quand tu t'en vas	2002	Frémeaux & Associés	with Benjamin Legrand and Philippe Baden Powell
Frémeaux and Associates Recordings 1994-1996	2003	Frémeaux & Associés	compilation
Baden Powell	2003	Universal	compilation, 13-CD box set with recordings from 1961-1972

With Herbie Mann

- Do the Bossa Nova with Herbie Mann (Atlantic, 1962)
- Latin Fever (Atlantic, 1964)

With Miltinho com o Sexteto Sideral

- Um Novo Astro (Sideral, 1960)

== Bibliography ==
- De Stefano, Gildo, Il popolo del samba, La vicenda e i protagonisti della storia della musica popolare brasiliana, Preface by Chico Buarque de Hollanda, Introduction by Gianni Minà, RAI-ERI, Rome 2005, ISBN 8839713484
- De Stefano, Gildo, Saudade Bossa Nova: musiche, contaminazioni e ritmi del Brasile, Preface by Chico Buarque, Introduction by Gianni Minà, Logisma Editore, Florence 2017, ISBN 978-88-97530-88-6
