= Os Afro-sambas =

Studio album by Vinícius de Moraes & Baden Powell
- Released: 1966
- Recorded: January 3, 1966
- Genres: Samba, MPB
- Length: 32:42
- Label: Forma
- Producer: Roberto Quartin • Wadi Gebara

Os Afro-sambas (Brazilian Portuguese: [uz afɾoˈsɐ̃bɐs]) is a 1966 studio album (that should not be confused with the album of the same name and different artwork recorded live) by Baden Powell and Vinícius de Moraes. The live album is ranked number 29 on Rolling Stone's list of 100 Greatest Brazilian Albums.

== Background ==
Considered a watershed (the original live recording) in MPB for fusing various elements of African sound with samba, Os Afro-sambas was recorded by Baden Powell, Vinícius de Moraes, and Quarteto em Cy in 1966.

In the mid-1960s Vinícius was interested in an LP of samba de roda songs with candomblé influences from Bahia. Baden Powell had also gone to Bahia and heard the songs of the Bahian candomblé. From this mutual interest in samba and religiosity found in Bahia, the Afro-sambas project emerged. The eight songs (11 in the live show) have a mix of candomblé and umbanda instruments (like atabaques and afoxés) with timbres common to Brazilian music (agogôs, the flute, and pandeiros) as well as Afro-Cuban rhythms.

The opening track, Canto de Ossanha, is ranked number 9 on Rolling Stone's list of 100 greatest Brazilian songs.

Baden Powell re-recorded this album in 1990 (and many other times in and right after 1966) again accompanied by Quarteto em Cy, but this time singing the lead vocal himself, Vinícius having died.

== Track listing ==
All tracks are jointly authored by Baden Powell and Vinícius de Moraes.

1. "Canto de Ossanha" - 03:23
2. "Canto de Xangô" - 06:28
3. "Bocoché" - 02:34
4. "Canto de Iemanjá" - 04:47
5. "Tempo de amor" - 04:28
6. "Canto do Caboclo Pedra-Preta" - 03:39
7. "Tristeza e solidão" - 04:35
8. "Lamento de Exu" - 02:16

== Personnel ==
- Vocals - Vinícius de Moraes, Quarteto em Cy and mixed choir
- Guitar - Baden Powell
- Flute - Nicolino Copia
- Tenor saxophone - Pedro Luiz de Assis
- Baritone saxophone - Aurino Ferreira
- Double bass - Jorge Marinho
- Drums - Reisinho
- Atabaque - Alfredo Bessa
- Little atabaque - Nelson Luiz
- Bongô - Alexandre Silva Martins
- Pandeiro - Gilson de Freitas
- Agogô - Mineirinho
- Afoxé - Adyr José Raimundo
- Arrangements and musical direction - Guerra Peixe
- Production and artistic direction - Roberto Quartin and Wadi Gebara Netto
- Recording technician - Ademar Rocha
- Photos - Pedro de Moraes
- Cover - Goebel Weyne
- Liner notes - Vinícius de Moraes
