= Nara Leão =

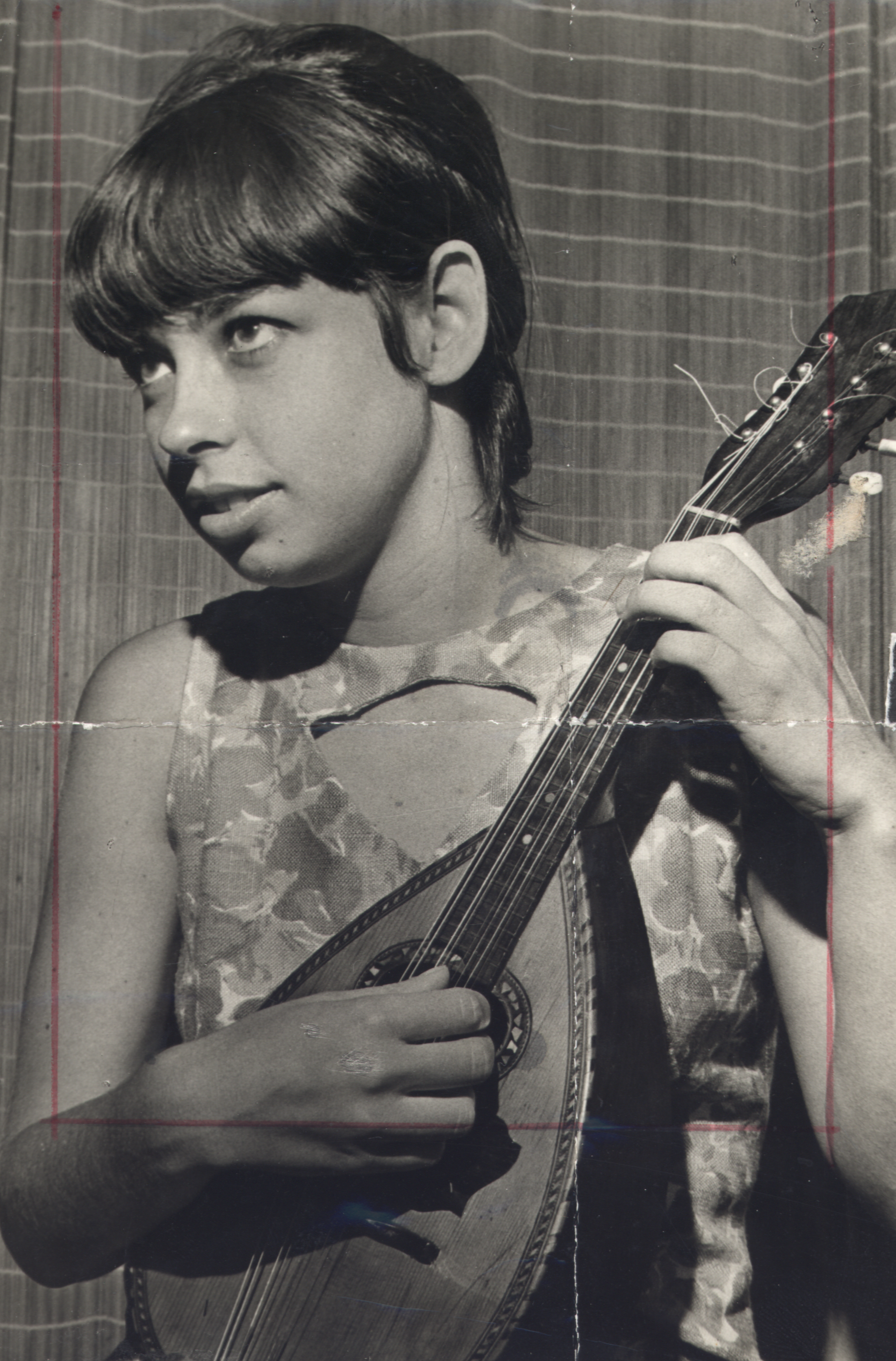
- Leão in 1964

Background information
- Born: Nara Lofego Leão; January 19, 1942; Vitória, Espírito Santo, Brazil
- Died: June 7, 1989 (aged 47) Rio de Janeiro, Brazil
- Genres: Bossa nova; MPB
- Instruments: Vocals; guitar
- Years active: 1963–1989

Nara Lofego Leão (Portuguese pronunciation: [ˈnaɾɐ leˈɐ̃w, li-]; January 19, 1942 – June 7, 1989) was a Brazilian bossa nova and MPB (popular Brazilian music) singer and occasional actress. Leão was married twice, to Ruy Guerra and subsequently Carlos Diegues, both film directors.

== Life ==
Leão was born in Vitória, Espírito Santo. When she was twelve, her father gave her a guitar since he was worried about her being shy. Her teachers were popular musician and composer Patrício Teixeira and classical guitarist Solon Ayala. As a teenager in the late 1950s, she became friends with a number of singers and composers who took part in Bossa Nova's musical revolution, including Roberto Menescal, Carlos Lyra, Ronaldo Bôscoli, João Gilberto, Vinicius de Moraes, and Antônio Carlos Jobim. There are even voices that claim that it was in her room in her parents' home in Copacabana, Rio de Janeiro, that the new music was born in the fifties. By 1963, after singing as an amateur for a few years, she became a professional and toured with Sérgio Mendes.

In the mid-1960s, the institution of military dictatorship in Brazil led her to sing increasingly political lyrics. Her show, Opinião, reflected her political beliefs, and she had largely switched to political music by this point. In 1964 she even spoke against bossa nova as a movement, calling it "alienating." In 1968 she appeared on the album Tropicália: ou Panis et Circenses, performing "Lindonéia."

She later left Brazil for Paris and in the 1970s abandoned music to focus on her family. She returned to music later, and when she discovered in 1986 that she had an inoperable brain tumor, she increased her productivity as much as possible. She died in 1989.

Nara's sister was Danuza Leão, a model and socialite who was also a newspaper columnist and occasional TV commentator.

== Discography ==
- 1989: My Foolish Heart
- 1987: Meus Sonhos Dourados
- 1986: Garota de Ipanema
- 1985: Nara e Menescal - Um Cantinho, Um Violão
- 1984: Abraços E Beijinhos e Carinhos Sem Ter Fim... Nara
- 1983: Meu Samba Encabulado
- 1982: Nasci Para Bailar
- 1981: Romance Popular
- 1980: Com Açúcar, Com Afeto
- 1979: Nara Canta en Castellano
- 1978: Debaixo Dos Caracóis Dos Seus Cabelos
- 1977: Meus Amigos São Um Barato
- 1974: Meu Primeiro Amor
- 1971: Dez Anos Depois
- 1969: Coisas do Mundo
- 1968: Nara Leão
- 1967: Vento de Maio
- 1967: Nara
- 1966: Liberdade, Liberdade
- 1966: Manhã de Liberdade
- 1966: Nara Pede Passagem
- 1966: Show Opinião
- 1965: Cinco na Bossa
- 1965: O Canto Livre de Nara
- 1964: Opinião de Nara
- 1964: Nara

== Bibliography ==
- De Stefano, Gildo, Il popolo del samba, La vicenda e i protagonisti della storia della musica popolare brasiliana, Preface by Chico Buarque de Hollanda, Introduction by Gianni Minà, RAI-ERI, Rome 2005, ISBN 8839713484
- De Stefano, Gildo, Saudade Bossa Nova: musiche, contaminazioni e ritmi del Brasile, Preface by Chico Buarque, Introduction by Gianni Minà, Logisma Editore, Florence 2017, ISBN 978-88-97530-88-6
