= Philippe Baden Powell =

- Born: 15 April 1978 (age 48); Neuilly-sur-Seine
- Genres: Brazilian instrumental music and contemporary jazz
- Occupations: Pianist and composer/songwriter
- Years active: 1993 –
- Website: philippepowell.com

Philippe Baden Powell (born 15 April 1978 in Paris) is a French-Brazilian pianist and composer.

== Biography ==
Baden Powell started playing the piano at the age of 7. Taught by his father, the Brazilian guitarist Baden Powell, he learned the intricacies of composition, harmony, and improvisation. As a teenager, he lived with his family in Brazil, where Gonzalo Rubalcaba became his musical role model. He also studied at the Conservatório Brasileiro de Música in Rio de Janeiro and the Ecole Normale de Musique Alfred Cortot in Paris. After studying in Paris, he moved back to Rio de Janeiro and worked with Brazilian musicians such as Seu Jorge, Marcelo D2, Maria Bethânia, Flora Purim, Airto Moreira and Roberto Menescal.

In 2005, Baden Powell won third prize at the Montreux Jazz Solo Piano Competition. With Brazilian trumpeter Rubinho Antunes, he founded the quartet Ludere.

Baden Powell has released 13 albums, including Notes Over The Poetry, in collaboration with singer David Linx and drummer André Ceccarelli, and Retratos, which was released with the Brazilian quartet Ludere. In 2022 he released Entre eux deux with Melody Gardot, described by one reviewer as "showcasing Gardot's mellifluous vocals and Powell's consummate piano technique and a seemingly telepathic connection between two distint musical voices."

Baden Powell has also worked as a sideman, collaborating with artists such as Ibrahim Maalouf and Laurent Voulzy. He has contributed to soundtracks including Zanine, Ser do Arquitetar (2016), a documentary celebrating the life and work of the Brazilian architect Zanine Caldas.

== Discography ==
- 2002 - Samba in Prelúdio: Quand Tu t´en Vas, with Baden Powell and Benjamin Legrand
- 2009 - Afrosambajazz: A Música de Baden Powell (Biscoito Fino), with Mário Adnet
- 2012 - Piano Masters Series, Volume 2. Philippe Baden Powell (Adventure Music)
- 2016 - Ludere, with Bruno Barbosa, Daniel de Paula and Rubinho Antunes
- 2017 - Retratos (Blaxtream), with Bruno Barbosa, Daniel de Paula and Rubinho Antunes
- 2017 - Notes Over Poetry (Far Out Recordings)
- 2018 - Live at Bird's Eye, with Bruno Barbosa, Daniel de Paula and Rubinho Antunes
- 2020 - Baden Inedito, with Bruno Barbosa, Daniel de Paula and Rubinho Antunes
- 2022 - Tipo Samba, with Bruno Barbosa, Daniel de Paula and Rubinho Antunes
- 2022 - Entre eux Deux, with Melody Gardot (Decca )
