= Quarteto em Cy =

Brazilian girl group

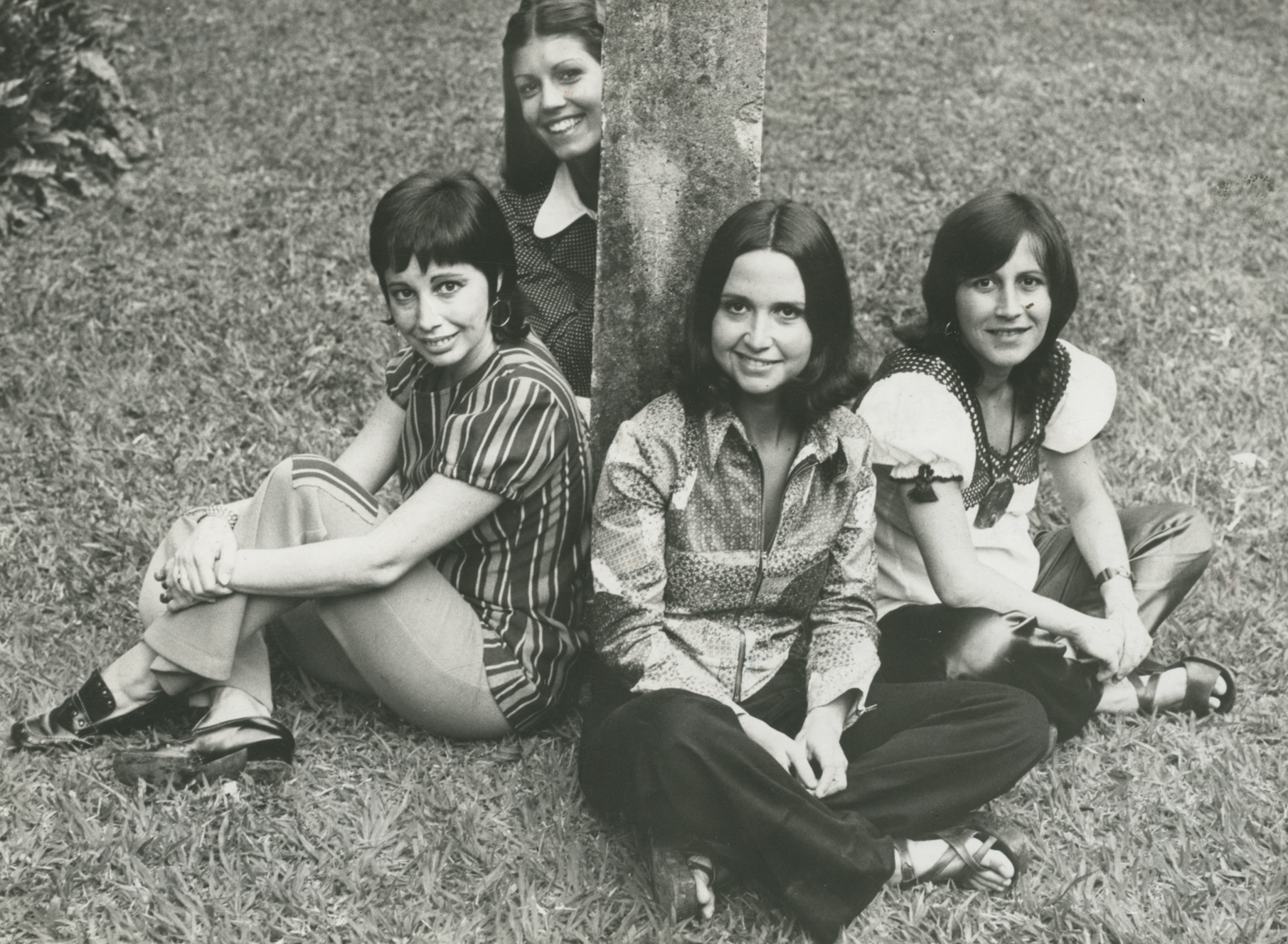
- Quarteto em Cy in 1972

Background information
- Origin: Ibirataia, Bahia, Brazil
- Genres: Bossa nova, tropicalia, pop, MPB
- Years active: 1959–2023
- Labels: Elenco; Odeon; Philips
- Past members: Cyva †; Cynara †; Cybele †; Cylene; Regina Werneck; Sônia Ferreira; Semiramis Rubim; Sandra Machado; Dorinha Tapajós †; Keyla Fogaça; Corina Viana
- Website: instagram.com/quartetoemcy

Quarteto em Cy (a play on words of the Portuguese for Quartet in B by poet and lyricist Vinícius de Moraes) was a Brazilian girl group originally composed of four sisters hailing from Ibirataia, a town located in the Brazilian state of Bahia: Cybele, Cylene, Cynara and Cyva — their real first names.

== History ==
They started performing in 1959, appearing on local television in that year. Cyva, the leader of the group, then moved to Rio de Janeiro, and persuaded her three sisters to join her there. They then started to make regular appearances in the boates (small nightclubs) of Rio, particularly Bottle's bar and the legendary Zum-Zum, where they caught the attention of Vinicius de Moraes and other prominent figures of the bossa nova scene. Their first album was released in 1964, and was to be followed by regular releases up to the late '90s, at the frequency of one a year, and sometimes more. Connoisseurs of MPB and tropicalia have a particular regard for the first few years of their recording career, when they were signed to Brazil's most daring label, Elenco.

The Quarteto em Cy, noted for the precision of the vocalists' intonation and delivery, performed and recorded with almost every single major Brazilian artist of the '60s and '70s; their popularity exceeded and still exceeds the borders of their native country. They met with great success in America in the mid-sixties, and have a considerable following in Japan, where they still tour regularly.

The line-up of the quartet (which briefly split up, from 1970 to 1972) has changed a great deal over the years. However, the formation with Cyva and Sonya was kept active for many years since 1980, by far the most stable period in the group's history.

On 21 August 2014, Cybele died of a lung ischemia at her home in Rio de Janeiro. She was 74. Cynara died on 11 April 2023, at the age of 78. Cyva died on 22 October 2023, in Rio de Janeiro, at the age of 85.

== Discography ==
- 1964: Quarteto em Cy
- 1965: Vinícius/Caymmi no Zum Zum – with Quarteto em Cy and Oscar Castro Neves
- 1965: Caymmi and The Girls From Bahia – Quarteto em Cy and Dorival Caymmi
- 1966: Som Definitivo – Quarteto em Cy and Tamba Trio
- 1966: Os Afro-Sambas – Quarteto em Cy, Vinicius de Moraes and Baden Powell
- 1966: The Girls From Bahia/Pardon My English
- 1966: Quarteto em Cy
- 1967: De Marré de Cy
- 1967: ¡Revolución con Brasilia!/The Girls From Bahia
- 1968: Em Cy Maior
- 1972: Quarteto em Cy
- 1974: Saravá, Vinicius! Vinicius de Moraes en São Paulo Con Toquinho y Quarteto em Cy
- 1975: Antologia do Samba Canção
- 1976: Antologia do Samba Canção/volume 2
- 1977: Resistindo Ao Vivo
- 1978: Querelas do Brasil
- 1978: Cobra de Vidro – Quarteto em Cy e MPB4
- 1979: Quarteto em Cy Em 1000 Kilohertz
- 1980: Flicts – Quarteto em Cy, MPB4 and Sérgio Ricardo
- 1980: Quarteto em Cy interpreta Gonzaguinha, Caetano, Ivan, Milton
- 1981: Caymmis, Lobos e Jobins/Caminhos Cruzados
- 1983: Pontos de Luz
- 1989: Claudio Santoro Prelúdios e Canções de Amor
- 1990: Os Afro-Sambas – Quarteto em Cy, Vinicius de Moraes and Baden Powell
- 1991: Chico em Cy
- 1992: Bossa em Cy
- 1993: Vinícius em Cy
- 1994: Tempo e Artista
- 1996: Brasil em Cy
- 1997: Bate-Boca – Quarteto em Cy e MPB4
- 1998: Somos Todos Iguais – Quarteto em Cy and MPB4, with Ivan Lins and Djavan
- 1999: Gil e Caetano em Cy
- 2000: Vinícius A Arte do Encontro – Quarteto em Cy and MPB4
- 2001: Falando de Amor pra Vinícius Ao Vivo – Quarteto em Cy and Luiz Cláudio Ramos
- 2001: Hora da Criança
- 2002: Quarteto em Cy
- 2004: Quarteto em Cy Quarenta Anos
- 2006: Samba em Cy

== Bibliography ==
- Enciclopédia da música brasileira: erudita, folclórica e popular. São Paulo, Art Editora, 2000
