= Varre-Sai =

- Municipality
- Município de Varre-Sai
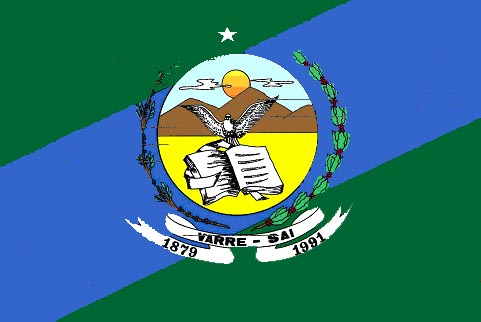
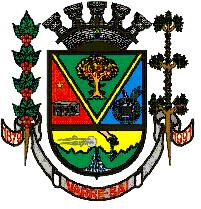
- Flag Coat of arms

- Location of Varre-Sai in the state of Rio de Janeiro

- Location of Varre-Sai in Brazil
- Coordinates: 20°55′51″S 41°52′08″W
- Country: Brazil
- Region: Southeast
- State: Rio de Janeiro

Government
  - Prefeito: Silvestre Gorini (PSD)

Area
  - Total: 201.938 km^{2} (77.969 sq mi)
- Elevation: 221 m (725 ft)

Population (2022)
  - Total: 10,207
  - Density: 50.545/km^{2} (130.91/sq mi)
- Time zone: UTC−3 (BRT)

Varre-Sai (Portuguese pronunciation: [ˌvaʁiˈsaj], Sweep Before You Part) is a municipality located in the Brazilian state of Rio de Janeiro. Its population was 10,207 (2022) and its area is 201 km^{2}.
