= Vinicius de Moraes =

Brazilian poet and lyricist (1913–1980)

Sua Excelência, o Embaixador Vinícius de Moraes
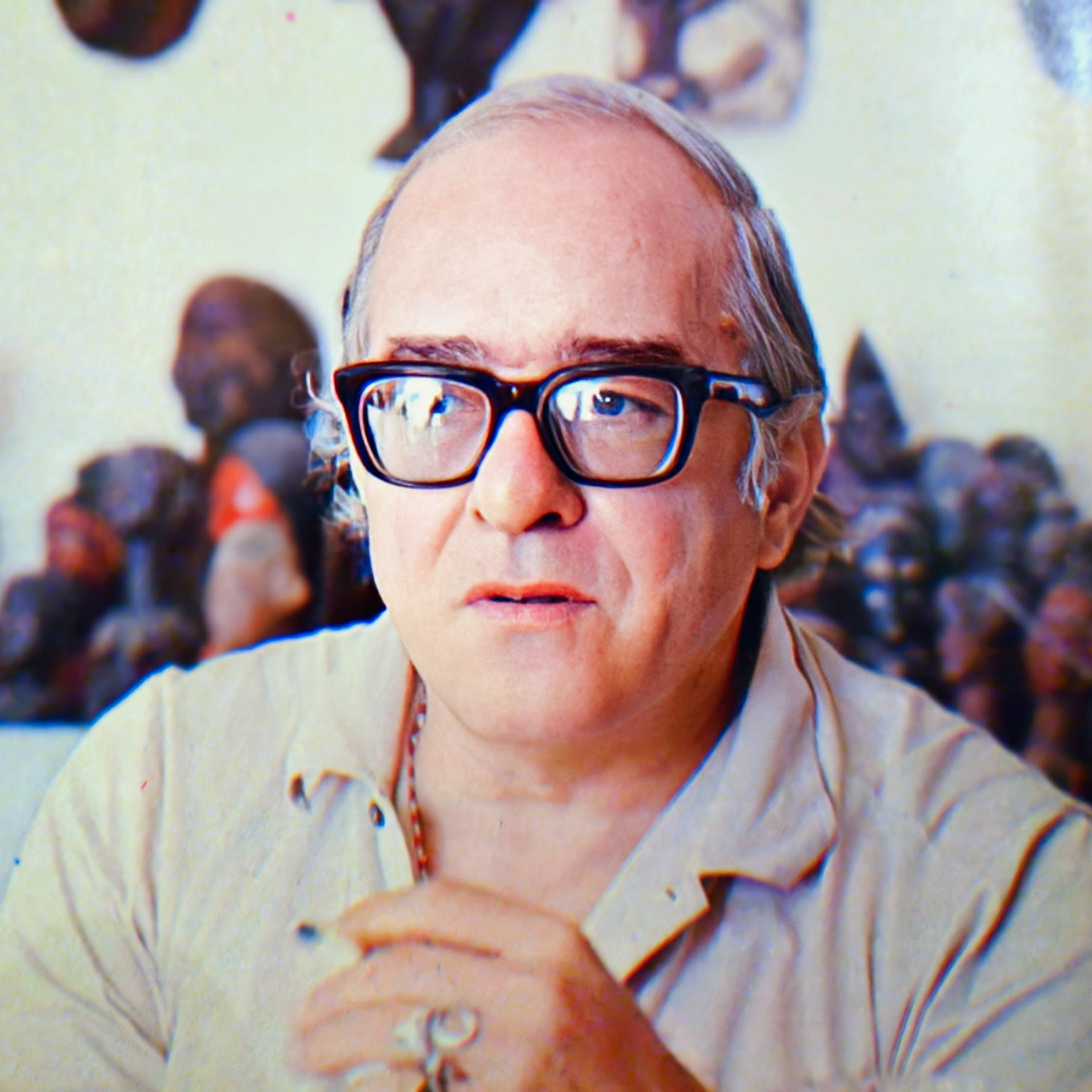
- Vinícius de Moraes in Paris (1970)
- Born: Marcus Vinícius da Cruz e Mello Moraes; 19 October 1913; Rio de Janeiro, Brazil
- Died: 9 July 1980 (aged 66); Rio de Janeiro, Brazil
- Education: Federal University of Rio de Janeiro
- Occupations: Poet; lyricist; essayist; playwright; diplomat
- Writing career
- Pen name: "O Poetinha": "O Diplomata"
- Genre: Bossa Nova
- Literary movement: Modernism

Marcus Vinícius da Cruz e Mello Moraes (19 October 1913 – 9 July 1980), better known as Vinícius de Moraes (Brazilian Portuguese: [viˈnisjuz dʒi moˈɾajs]) and nicknamed "O Poetinha" ("The Little Poet"), was a Brazilian poet, diplomat, lyricist, essayist, musician, singer, and playwright. With his frequent and diverse musical partners, including Antônio Carlos Jobim, his lyrics and compositions were instrumental in the birth and introduction to the world of bossa nova music. He recorded numerous albums, many in collaboration with noted artists, and also served as a successful Brazilian career diplomat.

== Early life ==
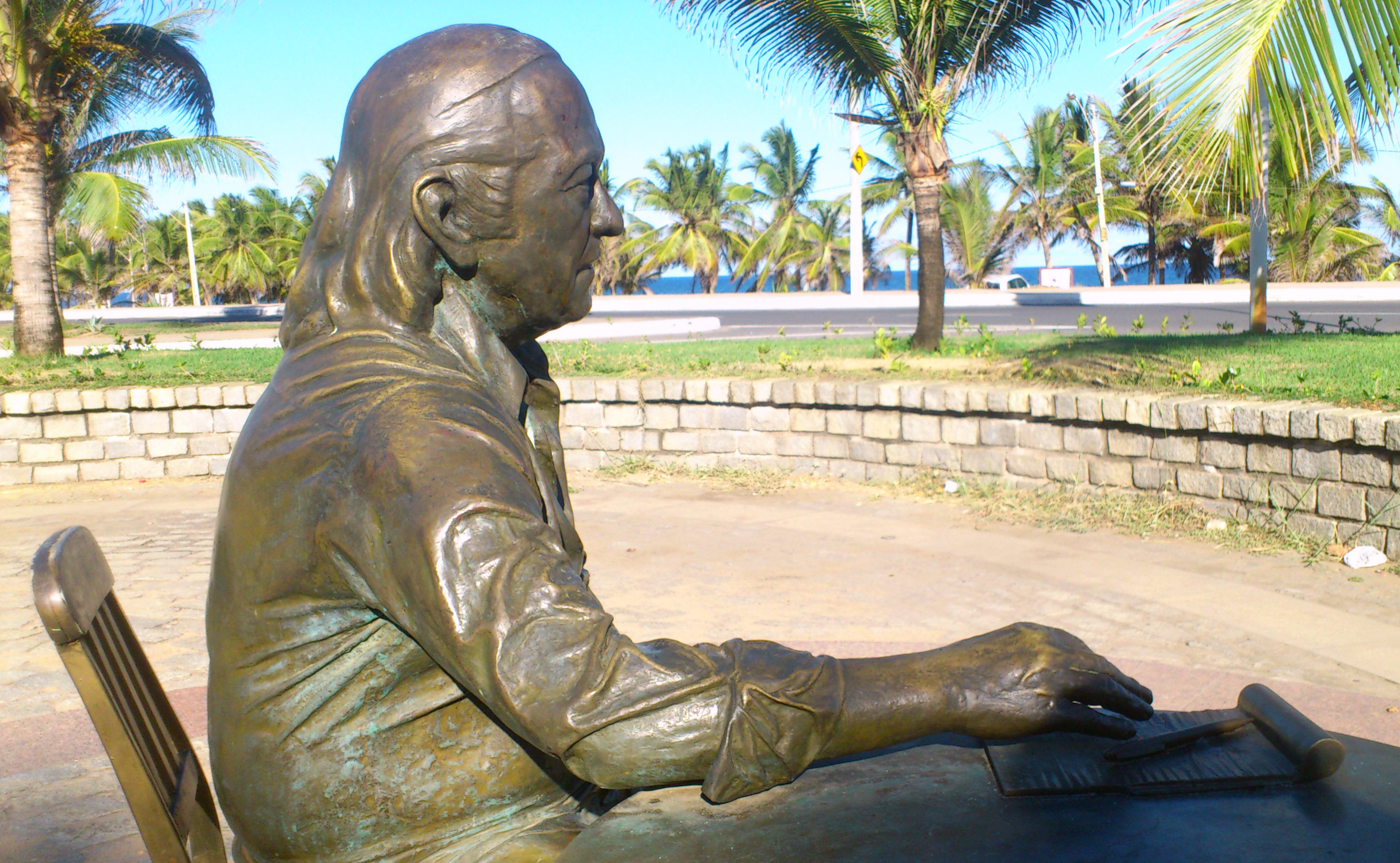
Sculpture of Vinicius, commemorating his work "Uma tarde em Itapuã".

Moraes was born in Gávea, a neighbourhood of Rio de Janeiro, to Clodoaldo da Silva Pereira Moraes, a public servant, and Lidia Cruz, a housewife and amateur pianist. In 1916, his family moved to Botafogo, where he attended Afrânio Peixoto Primary School. Fleeing the Copacabana Fort revolt, his parents moved to Governador Island while Moraes remained at his grandfather's home in Botafogo to finish school. During visits with his parents on weekends and holidays, he became acquainted with the accomplished composer Ary Barroso.

Beginning in 1924, Moraes attended St. Ignatius, a Jesuit high school, where he sang in the choir and wrote theatrical sketches. Three years later, he became friends with the brothers Paulo and Haroldo Tapajós, with whom he wrote his first musical compositions, which were performed at friends' parties. In 1929, he completed high school and his family moved back to Gávea. That same year, he was admitted to the Faculty of Law at the Federal University of Rio de Janeiro (UFRJ). At the "School of Catete", he became friends with essayist and future novelist Otávio de Faria, a Catholic militant and leader of a group of right-wing Catholics organized around Centro Dom Vital, a think-tank created by Jackson de Figueiredo shortly before his death.

Faria encouraged Moraes' literary vocation, and tried to recruit him to the conservative cause. Moraes received his college degree in Legal and Social Sciences in 1933. Soon after, he published his first two collections of poetry: Caminho para a distancia ("Path into the Distance") (1933) and Forma e exegese ("Form and Exegesis"). Both collections were composed and published under Octavio de Faria's informal editorship. The collections were symbolist poetry concerned with Catholic mysticism and the search for redemption of sexual seduction.

In his essay "Two Poets" (1935), Faria compared Moraes' poetry to that of Augusto Frederico Schmidt. The tension between Faria's and Moraes' shared Catholic activism and Faria's unrequited attraction to Moraes strained their friendship. Faria attempted suicide because of this unrequited love. Despite their estrangement, Moraes wrote two sonnets, the first in 1939 ("Sonnet to Octavio de Faria"), the second during the 1960s ("Octavio") in carefully couched praise of his friend.

In 1936, Moraes became a film censor for the Ministry of Education and Health. Two years later, he won a British Council fellowship to study English language and literature at Magdalen College, Oxford University. He abandoned his use of blank verse and free verse in favor of the sonnet, both the Italian form used in Portuguese poetry (two quatrains, two tercets) and the English form (three quatrains and a couplet). He was considered one of the most prominent of the "Generation of '45", a group of Brazilian writers in the 1930s and 1940s who rejected early modernism in favor of traditional forms and vocabulary. If João Cabral de Melo Neto's works and technique served the depiction of objective reality, those of Moraes served the depiction of the subjective mood of sexual love. The basic meter in Moraes' love poetry is the decasyllable, taken mostly from Camões's lyric poetry.

During his stay in England, Moraes wrote the verse collection Novos poemas ("New Poems"). While there, he married (by proxy) Beatriz Azevedo de Mello, with whom he subsequently had two children: filmmaker Suzana de Moraes and Pedro. In 1941, he returned to Brazil and worked as a film critic for the newspaper A Manhã ("The Morning"), as a contributor to the literary journal Clima ("Climate"), and at the Banking Employees' Institute of Social Security, the public pension fund for workers in banking institutions.

During the following year, he failed the admission test for a diplomatic career at the Ministry of Foreign Affairs (MRE). Shortly after, he was hired to accompany American writer Waldo Frank, a literary acquaintance, on tour across northern Brazil. In Moraes' words, it was contact with both Frank and "appalling poverty" that turned him into "a man of the Left".

In 1943, Moraes passed the MRE admission test on his second attempt and as his first posting was assigned as vice-consul at the Brazilian Consulate in Los Angeles, California. There, he published a book of poems, Cinco elegias ("Five Elegies"), followed by Poemas, sonetos e baladas ("Poems, Sonnets, and Ballads"). After his father died in 1950, he went to Brazil, then returned to Los Angeles and published two more books: Livro de sonetos ("Book of Sonnets") and Novos poemas II ("New Poems II"). Continuing his diplomatic career, during the 1950s, Moraes worked for the Brazilian consular service in Paris and Rome. In Rome, he often visited historian Sergio Buarque de Holanda (father of the musician Chico Buarque de Holanda), who was teaching in Italy as a visiting scholar.

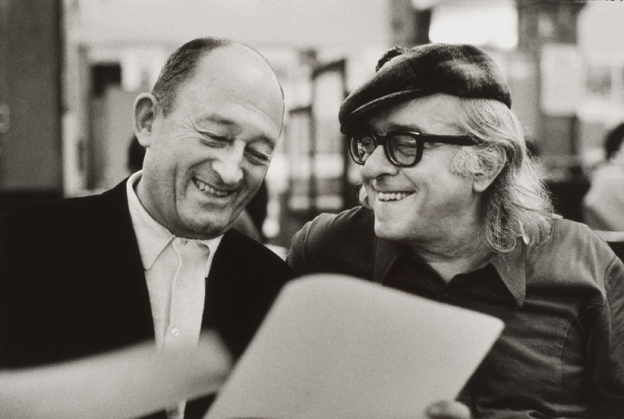
Vinicius with Pierre Seghers

In 1951, Moraes married his second wife, Lila Maria Esquerdo e Boscoli. He wrote film reviews for Samuel Wainer's Vargoist paper Última Hora. He was named a delegate to the Punta del Este film festival and was given a commission to study the management of film festivals at Cannes, Berlin, Locarno, and Venice, in view of the forthcoming São Paulo Cinema Festival, which was to be a part of the commemoration of the city's 400th anniversary.

In 1953, his third child, Georgiana, was born, and his fourth child with Lila Maria was born in 1956. He went to Paris as the second secretary at the Brazilian embassy in France. He released his first samba, "Quando tu passas por mim" ("When You Pass By"), which was composed with Antônio Maria. During the next year, he wrote lyrics to chamber music pieces by Cláudio Santoro. He became a well-known playwright with the staging of his musical Orfeu da Conceição ("Orpheus of the Conception") in 1956 and for the film made of it called Black Orpheus. He met pianist Tom Jobim, who was commissioned to write music for the play. Jobim wrote "Se todos fossem iguais a você" ("If Others Were Like You"), "Um nome de mulher" ("A Woman's Name"), and other songs included in the production. The play was staged in 1956 in São Paulo and Rio de Janeiro, having its text published in a deluxe edition illustrated by Carlos Scliar. At the end of 1956, Moraes returned to France, having been transferred in 1957 from the Brazilian embassy to the Brazilian representation at UNESCO in Paris. In 1958, he was transferred to the Brazilian embassy in Montevideo, returning to Brazil in transit. While in Brazil, he married Maria Lucia Proença.

== Bossa nova ==
Elizete Cardoso's Canção do Amor Demais -- a seminal album in the development of bossa nova -- consists of compositions by Jobim and Moraes, either working together or solo ("Canção do Amor Demais", "Luciana", "Estrada Branca", "Chega de Saudade", "Outra Vez"...). The recording also included a relatively unknown João Gilberto on two tracks. With the release of this record, Moraes's career in music had begun.

In August 1962, Moraes performed for the first time as a singer with Jobim and Gilberto at the Au Bon Gourmet in Rio. This was the first of his "pocket-shows", performances made to small audiences where he presented new compositions, some of which became international hits, such as the "Garota de Ipanema" ("The Girl from Ipanema"), as well as "Samba da Benção". Moraes introduced promising singers of the time, such as Nara Leão. Moraes wasn't a natural singer. He had a flat, nasal baritone voice, but he used background vocalists to sweeten the sound. His first undertaking as entertainer ended in 1963, when he returned to his post in the Brazilian representation at UNESCO, after his marriage to Nelita Abreu Rocha, his fourth wife.

== Cinema recognition and collaborations ==
His play Orfeu da conceição (Orpheus of the Conception), a reworking of the story of Orpheus and Eurydice set in the carnival of Rio, was adapted into the film Black Orpheus, which won an Academy Award in 1959 as Best Foreign Language Film. It was awarded the Palme d'Or at the Cannes International Film Festival and the 1960 British Academy Award. De Moraes hated the film, however, leaving mid-screening and shouting that his play had been "disfigured"; the film has been criticized in Brazil since release for its exoticism and stereotyping of Brazilians. The film was a co-production among France, Italy, and Brazil and included "A felicidade" ("Happiness"), a song by Jobim and Moraes, which became an international hit. His song "Samba da bênção" ("The Blessing Samba") was included on the soundtrack of A Man and a Woman (Un homme et une femme, 1966), another Cannes film festival winner.

== Later life ==
During the 1960s and 1970s, Moraes collaborated with Baden Powell on a series of songs known as the Afro sambas. He collaborated with Edu Lobo on the Elis Regina hit song "Arrastão".

During a purge at the Ministry of Foreign Relations, he was forcibly retired in 1969 at the age of 55. Although taken aback by his forced retirement, he laughed at the case against him. When it was made known that the ministry purge was directed against "homosexuals and drunks", he jokingly retorted that his alcoholism was public knowledge.

In the 1970s, Moraes collaborated with Antônio Pecci Filho, a guitarist and vocalist nicknamed Toquinho, on musical and literary works. He married three women in succession: Cristina Gurjão, with whom he had a daughter, Maria; the actress Gesse Gessy; and the Argentinian Marta Rodrigues Santamaria. He toured Europe with Chico Buarque and Nara Leão, and Argentina with Dorival Caymmi and Oscar Castro-Neves. His most stable musical partnership, however, remained with Toquinho, with whom he released popular albums. Their live performances in Brazil and Europe were often conducted as intimate meetings with the public. Moraes sat onstage at a table with a checked tablecloth and a bottle of whiskey, chatting and telling amusing stories to the audience in French, English, Spanish, Italian, and Portuguese.

== Death and legacy ==
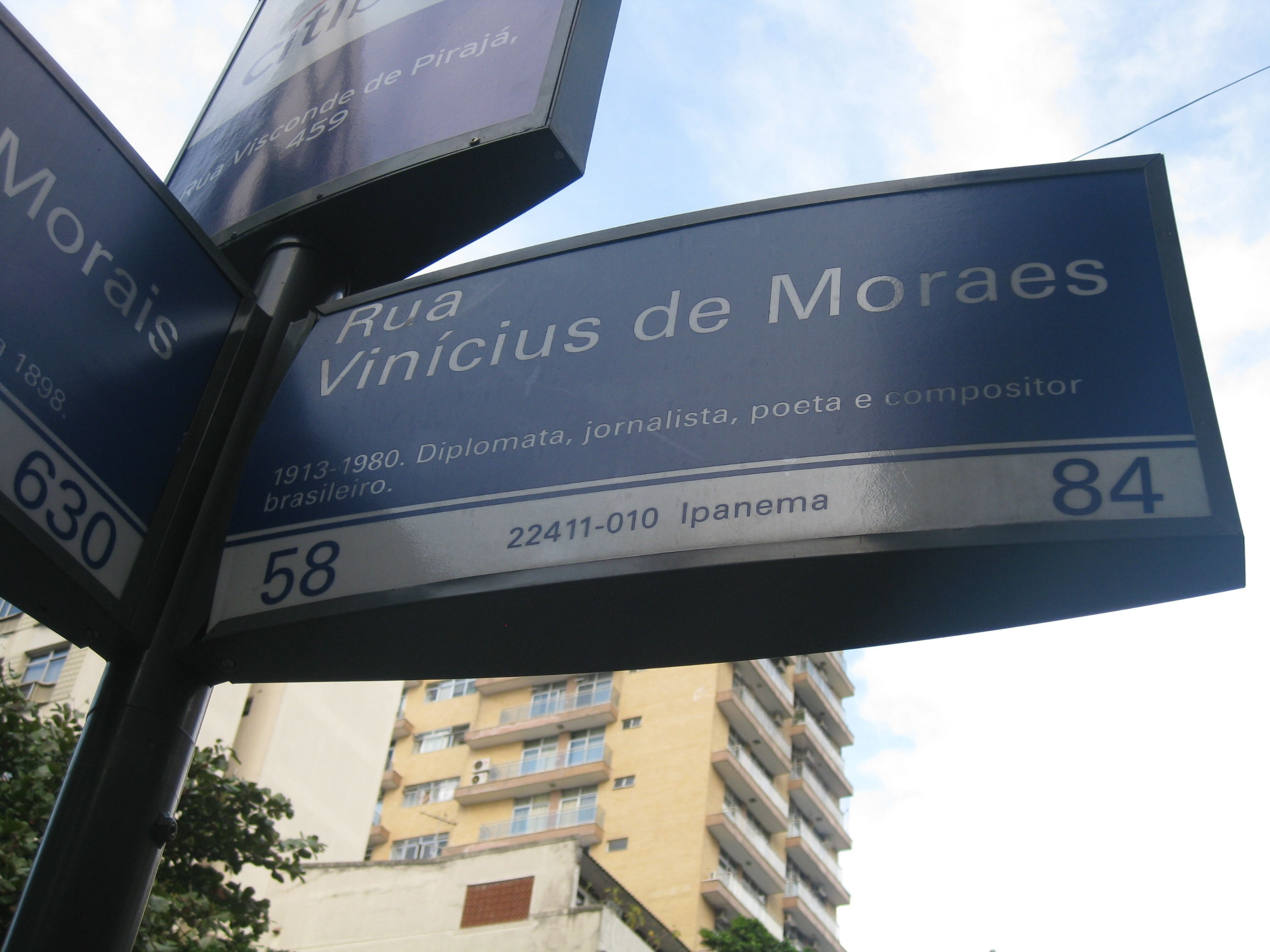
Vinícius de Moraes street in Rio de Janeiro

Moraes was a chain smoker and alcoholic who said, "O uísque é o melhor amigo do homem—é o cão engarrafado" ("Whiskey is man's best friend, it's the dog in a bottle"), After a long period of poor health, which included several visits to rehabilitation clinics, he died at his home in Rio de Janeiro on 9 July 1980, at the age of 66, in the company of his ninth wife, Gilda de Queirós Mattoso, and the faithful Toquinho. He is buried in Rio de Janeiro's Cemitério São João Batista.

In 2006, Moraes was posthumously reinstated to the Brazilian diplomatic corps. In February 2010, Brazil's lower house, the Camara dos Deputados, approved his posthumous promotion to ambassador.

In December 2014, following a three-week public vote, the mascot of the 2016 Summer Olympics was named after him.

In 2019, singer Mart'nália released an album paying tribute to Vinicius' work, which won the Latin Grammy for Best Samba/Pagode Album.

== Discography ==
Year	Album	Partnership	Label
1956	Orfeu da Conceição	Tom Jobim	Odeon
1963	Vinícius e Odete Lara	Odete Lara, Baden Powell	Elenco
1965	De Vinícius e Baden especialmente para Ciro Monteiro	Baden Powell	Elenco
1965	Vinícius e Caymmi no Zum Zum	Dorival Caymmi	Elenco
1966	Os Afro-sambas	Baden Powell	Elenco
1966	Vinícius: poesia e canção		Forma
1967	Garota de Ipanema (film soundtrack)		Philips
1967	Vinícius		Elenco
1969	Vinícius em Portugal		Festa
1970	En La Fusa con Maria Creuza y Toquinho, rereleased with the Spanish title Grabado en Buenos Aires con Maria Creuza y Toquinho ("Recorded in Buenos Aires with Maria Creuza and Toquinho")	Maria Creuza, Toquinho	Diorama
1970	Amália/Vinícius	Amália Rodrigues	
1971	Como dizia o poeta...	Toquinho, Marília Medalha	RGE
1971	Toquinho e Vinícius	Toquinho	RGE
1971	En La Fusa	Maria Bethânia, Toquinho	Trova
1972	Marilia/Vinícius	Marilia Medalha	RGE
1972	Nossa filha Gabriela	Toquinho	Polydor
1972	São demais os perigos desta vida	Toquinho	RGE
1973	O Bem-Amado		Som Livre
1974	Vinícius & Toquinho	Toquinho	Philips
1974	Saravá Vinícius!	Quarteto em Cy, Toquinho	Mercury
1975	Vinícius/Toquinho	Toquinho	Philips
1975	O poeta e o violão	Toquinho	RGE
1976	La voglia, la pazzia, l'incoscienza, l'allegria	Ornella Vanoni, Toquinho	Vanilla
1976	Deus lhe pague	Edu Lobo	EMI
1977	Antologia poética		Philips
1977	Tom, Vinícius, Toquinho e Miúcha	Tom Jobim, Toquinho, Miúcha	Som Livre
1979	10 anos de Toquinho e Vinícius	Toquinho	Philips
1980	Um pouco de ilusão	Toquinho	Ariola
1980	Testamento...		RGE
1980	A arca de Noé	Toquinho	Universal
1981	A arca de Noé 2	Toquinho	PolyGram
1991	Poeta, moça e violão	Clara Nunes, Toquinho	Collector's Editora LTDA
2006	Vinícius & Amigos		Seleções/Reader's Digest
2015	Um encontro no Au bon gourmet	Joao Gilberto, Antonio Carlos Jobim	Doxy
