= Esplanada =

Municipality of Bahia, Brazil

- Municipality
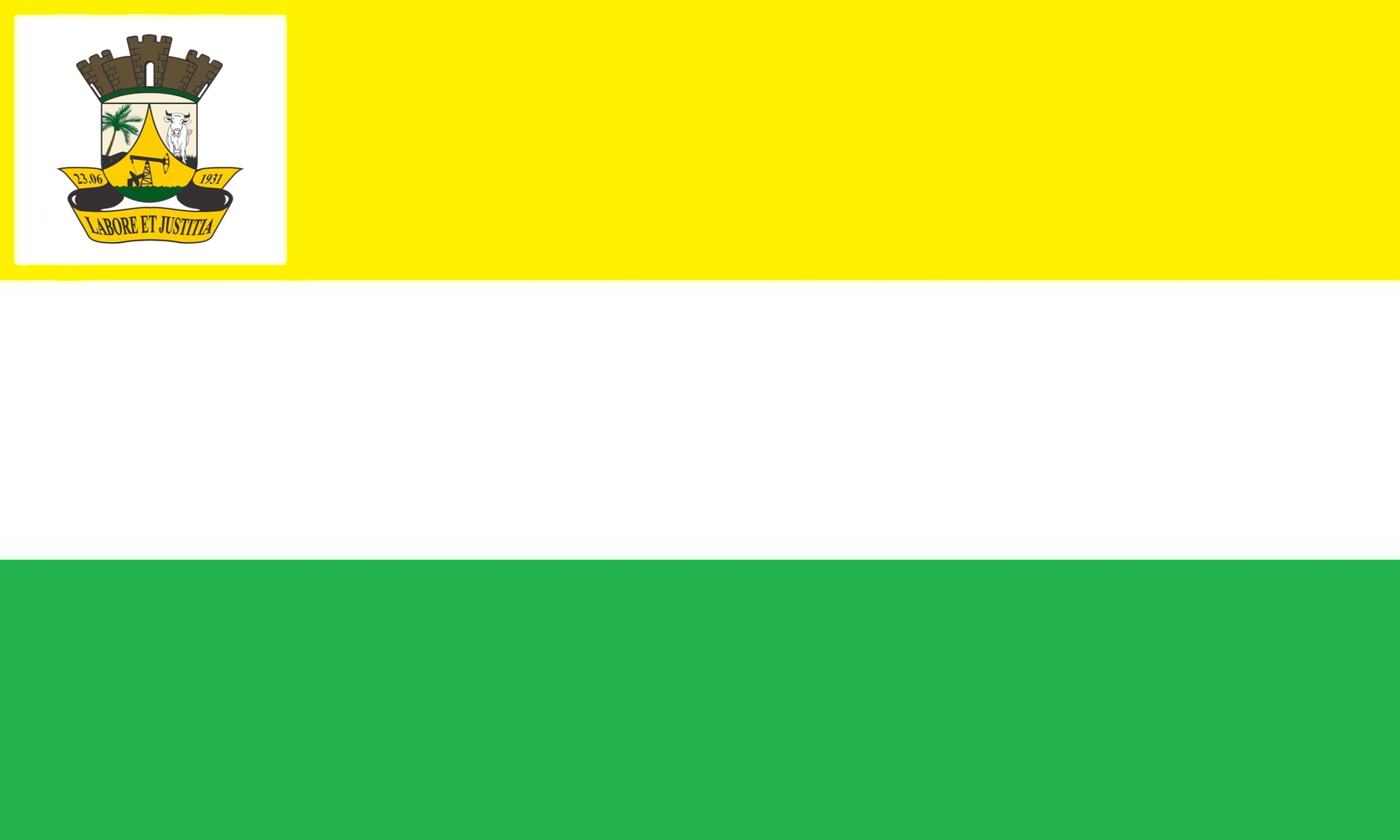
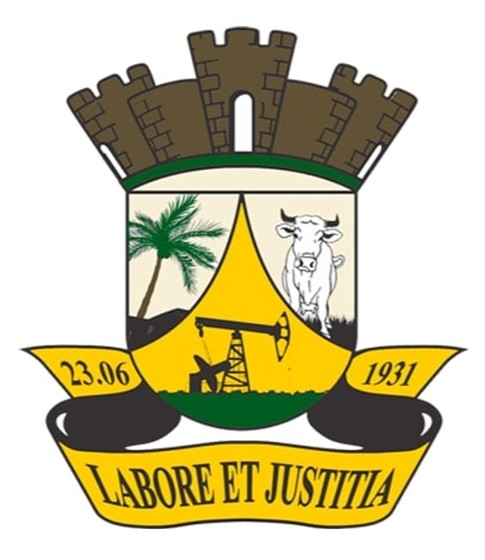
- Flag Coat of arms

- Location in Brazil
- Coordinates: 11.7958°S 37.945°W
- Country: Brazil
- Region: Nordeste
- State: Bahia

Population (2020)
  - Total: 37,578
- Time zone: UTC−3 (BRT)

Esplanada is a municipality in the state of Bahia in the North-East region of Brazil.

== See also ==
- List of municipalities in Bahia
