= Gildo De Stefano =

Italian music writer

Gildo de Stefano
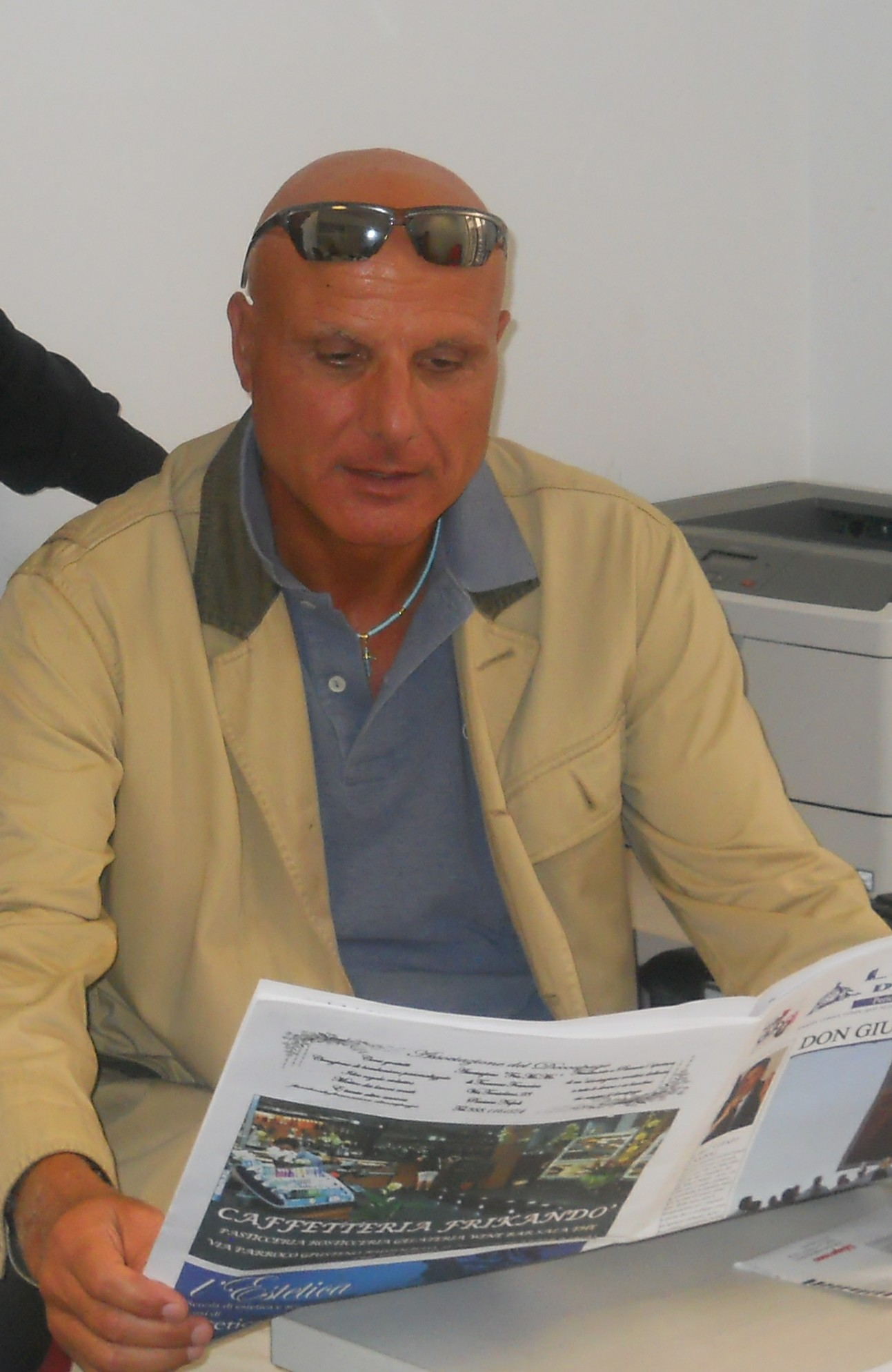
- De Stefano in 2012
- Born: 18 September 1953 (age 73); Naples, Italy
- Occupations: journalist, music critic and musicologist
- Years active: 1980–present
- Website: gildodestefano.it

Ermenegildo De Stefano (born 1953) is an Italian journalist, music critic and musicologist. He specializes in African-American music. He is a music journalist, sociologist, and critic for the Italian daily Roma and art director of the Italian Festival of Ragtime.

== Early life ==
He earned a degree in sociology of communications.

== Career ==
He began collaborating with RAI Radio in the 1980s, for which he conducted jazz programs and regularly published essays on Nuova Rivista Musicale Italiana published by RAI.

He organizes courses of Afro-American music and Creative Writing workshops in various Italian universities and music conservatories including San Pietro a Majella.

He is the author of the only ragtime history in Italian language, published by Marsilio Editori (Venice) in two editions, in 1984 and in 1991. In the mid-1990s, he won a national prize for journalism of the Ministry of Infrastructure and Transport to coincide with the arrival among finalists of literary Prize Calvin, and in the 2018 the Campania Felix International Journalism Award.

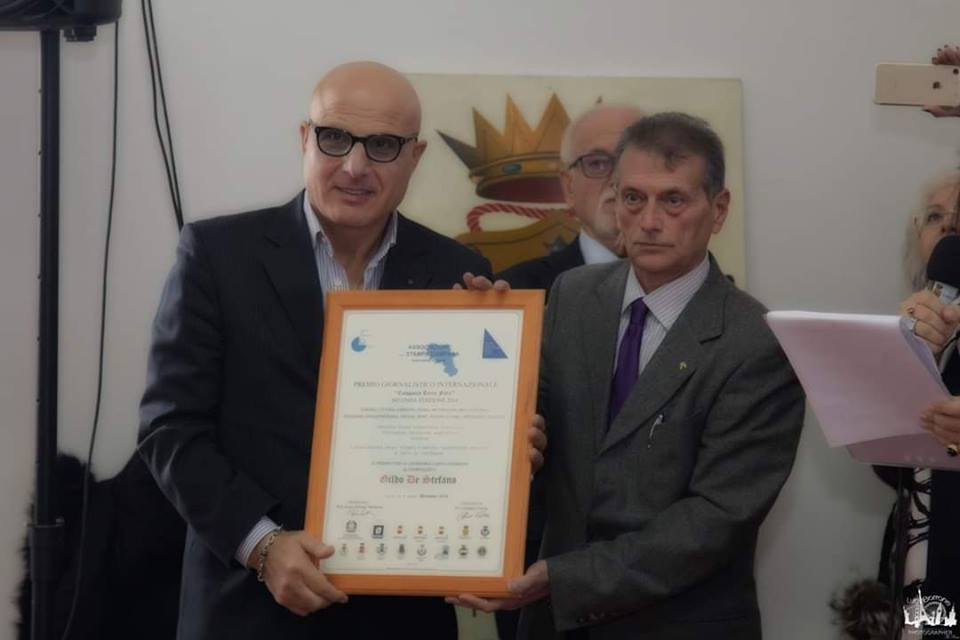
Gildo De Stefano receives the Campania Felix International Journalism Award from the president of the jury

He collaborates with international journals as the Canadian CODA magazine.

He is a member of the National Union of Writers and Artists.

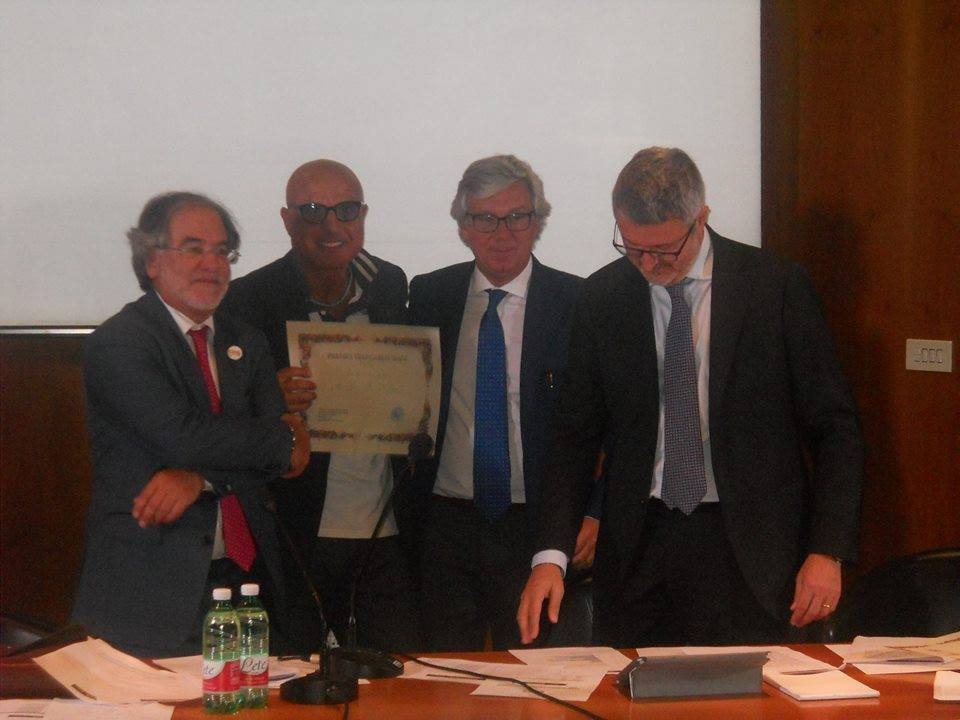
Gildo De Stefano received the "Giancarlo Siani Award" by the editor of the newspaper Il Mattino

== Works ==
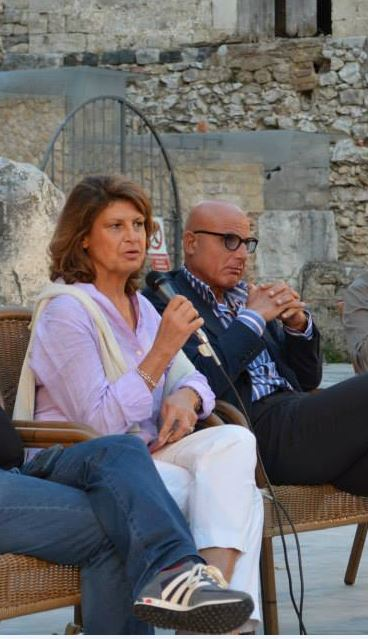
Silvia Costa, president of the European Commission Education and Culture, presents the book of Gildo De Stefano in Terracina Book Festival 2014.

- AfroAmerican Songs, Gammalibri Editions, Milan 1982.
- History of Ragtime: origins, evolution, technique, 1880–1980, Marsilio Editions, Venice 1984 ISBN 8831749846
- Three hundred years of Jazz: 1619–1919 – The origins of Afro-American music between sociology and anthropology, SugarCo Editions, Milan 1986.
- Modern Jazz: 1940–1960 – Chronicle of creative two decades , Kaos Editions, Milan 1990.
- Frank Sinatra (biography), Marsilio Editions, Venice 1991.
- Vinicio Capossela (biography), Lombardi Editions, Milan 1993.
- Francesco Guccini (biography), Lombardi Editions, Milan 1993.
- Louis Armstrong (biography), Préface by Renzo Arbore, Italian Scientific Editions, Naples 1997.
- Vesuwiev Jazz, Italian Scientific Editions, Préface by Renzo Arbore, Naples 1999.
- Easy street story, L'Isola dei ragazzi Editions, Naples 2007 ISBN 8887292965
- The people of samba: the story and the characters of Brazilian popular music, RAI Editions, Rome 2005.
- Around Ragtime and Jazz, Préface by Amiri Baraka, Introduction by Gianni Minà, Sugarco Editions, Milan 2007 ISBN 887198532X
- The Voice. Life and Italian roots of Frank Sinatra, Préface by Renzo Arbore, Coniglio Editions, Rome 2011
- A social history of jazz, Préface by Zygmunt Bauman, Mimesis Editions, Milan 2014 ISBN 9788857520018
- Naples stories, Amazon.it, Naples 2015, ASIN: B00XMZ1HOI
- Saudade Bossa Nova: music, contamination and rhythms of Brazil, Preface by Chico Buarque, Introduction di Gianni Minà, Logisma Editions, Florence 2017, ISBN 978-88-97530-88-6
- Frank Sinatra, l'italoamericano, Preface by Renzo Arbore, LoGisma Editore, Florence 2021, ISBN 978-88-94926-42-2
- Ballata breve di un gatto da strada - La vita e la morte di Malcolm X, Preface by Claudio Gorlier, Postface by Walter Mauro, NUA Editions Brescia 2021, ISBN 978-88-31399-49-4
- Diario di un suonatore guercio, inFuga Edizioni, Aversa 2023 ISBN 9791280624352
