= Antônio Carlos & Jocáfi =

Brazilian musical duo

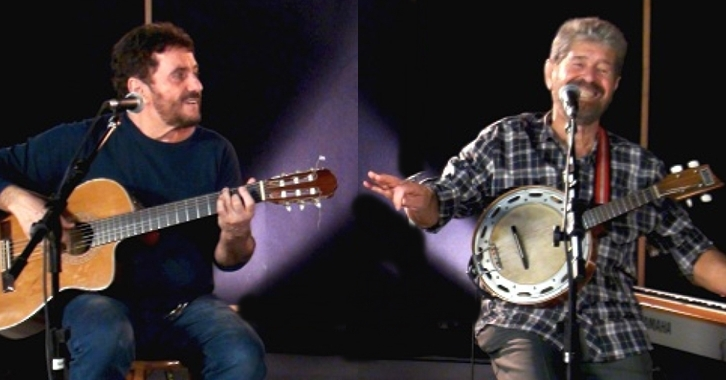
- Antônio Carlos (left) and Jocáfi (right) in 2015.

Background information
- Born: Antônio Carlos Marques Pinto; José Carlos Figueiredo (Jocáfi); October 24, 1945 (age 80) (Antônio Carlos); December 21, 1944 (age 81) (Jocáfi)
- Origin: Salvador, Bahia, Brazil
- Genres: Samba; Bossa nova; MPB
- Years active: 1969–present

Antônio Carlos e Jocáfi is a Brazilian musical duo from Salvador, Bahia, formed in 1969 by musicians Antônio Carlos Marques Pinto (born 24 October 1945) and José Carlos Figueiredo (born 21 December 1944).

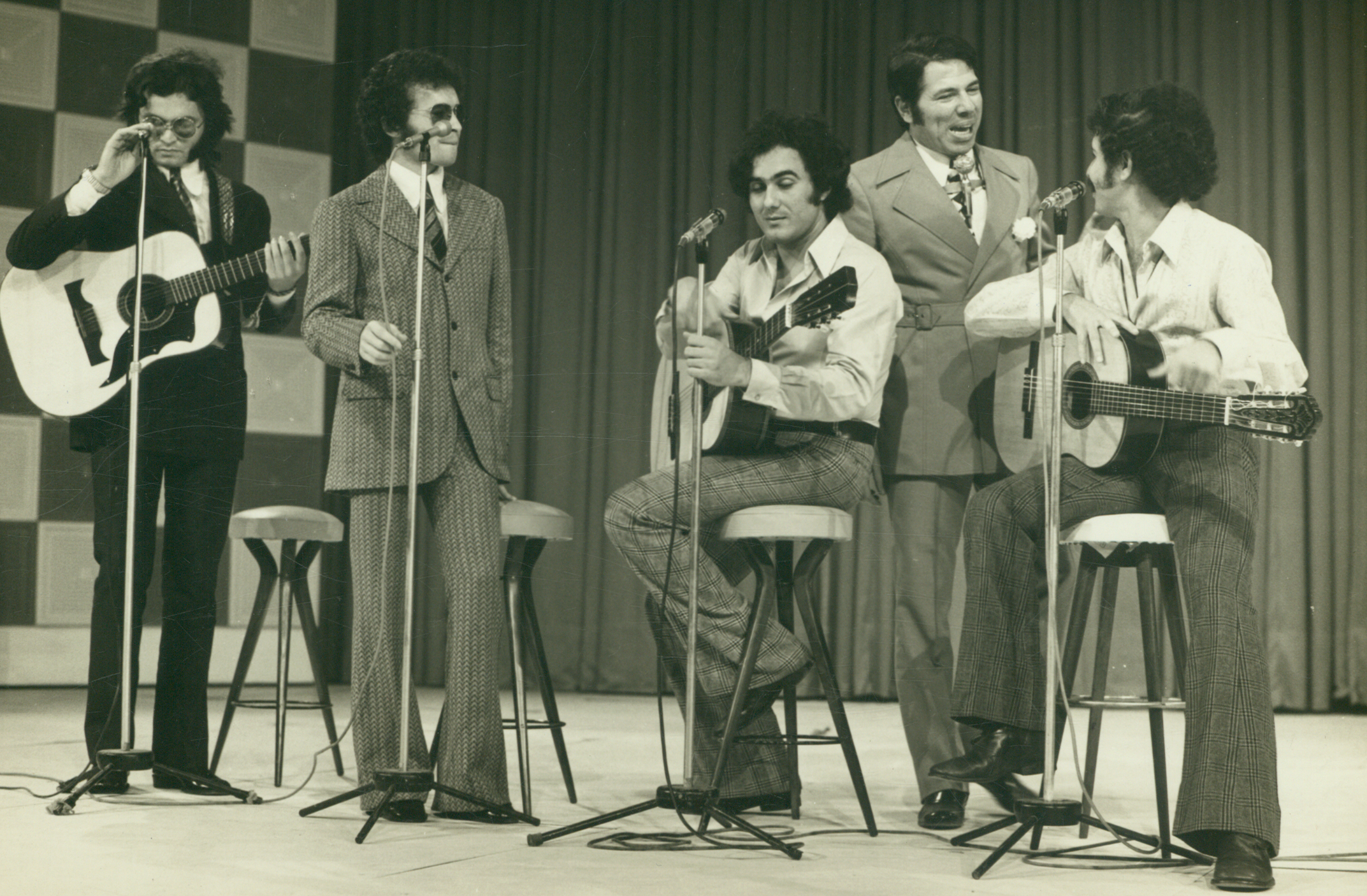
Antônio Carlos e Jocáfi (sitting), talking with Silvio Santos alongside Dom & Ravel (standing), 1972.

== Career ==
Antonio Carlos Marques Pinto grew up in the neighborhood of Rio Vermelho, in Salvador; in a musical family; José Carlos Filho (Jocafi) grew up in Cosme de Farias neighborhood.

They started their career as rivals playing in music festivals in Bahia. They were brought together as a duo by the pianist Carlos Lacerda and became known nationally in Brazil presenting in televised music festivals in Rio and São Paulo, such as the ones organized by TV Record.

Several of their songs have become part of the soundtrack of telenovelas, such as Minha Doce Namorada, (1971), O Primeiro Amor (1972), and Cuca Legal (1975), including some as the opening theme. Songs such as "Você abusou" were made hits through the voice of Maria Creuza, who would later marry Antônio Carlos. That song was adapted into Spanish as "Usted abusó", made famous by Celia Cruz and Willie Colón, and French as "Fais comme l'oiseau", sung by Michel Fugain.

Other successes include: "Jesuíno Galo-Doido", "Dona Flor e Seus Dois Maridos", "Desacato", "Toró de lágrimas", "Mas que doidice".

Their sound incorporated influences from Afro-Brazilian music and Candomblé; critics of the time classified their sentimental, not politically engaged compositions with the term "sambão-joia".

In 2022 they released the album Alto da Maravilha, featuring BaianaSystem's Russo Passapusso.

== Discography ==
Sources:

- Mudei de idéia (1971) - RCA Victor - LP
- Cada segundo (1972) - RCA Victor - LP
- Antonio Carlos & Jocafi (1973) - RCA Victor - LP
- Definitivamente (1974) - RCA Victor - LP
- Ossos do ofício (1975) - RCA Victor - LP
- Louvado seja (1977) - RCA Victor - LP
- Elas por elas (1978) - RCA Victor - LP
- Trabalho de Base (1980) - RCA Victor - LP
- Pássaro fugido (1984) - Lança/Polygram - LP
- Feitiço moleque (1986) - Continental - LP
- Samba, prazer e mistério (1994) - RCA/BMG - -LP/CD
- Grandes autores: Antônio Carlos e Jocáfi (1995) - BMG - CD
- Alto da Maravilha (2022) - Máquina de Louco
- Afro Funk Brasil (with Orquestra de Violões do Forte de Copacabana; 2022) - Altafonte
