= Gianni Minà =

Italian journalist (1938–2023)

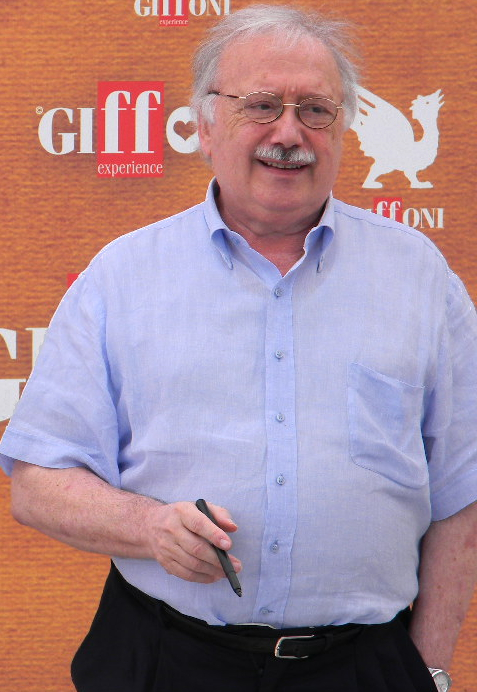
- Born: 17 May 1938
- Died: 27 March 2023 (aged 84); Rome
- Occupation: Journalist, film director, screenwriter
- Website: www.giannimina.it

Gianni Minà (Italian pronunciation: [ˈdʒanni miˈna]; 17 May 1938 – 27 March 2023) was an Italian journalist, writer, magazine editor, and television host. He collaborated with both Italian and International newspapers and magazines; produced hundreds of reports for RAI (Radiotelevisione Italiana); conceived and hosted television programmes, as well as produced successful documentary films on the lives of Che Guevara, Muhammad Ali, Fidel Castro, Rigoberta Menchú, Silvia Baraldini, Subcomandante Marcos and Diego Maradona.

Minà was the publisher and editor-in-chief of the literary journal Latinoamerica e tutti i sud del mondo ("Latin America and All the Souths in the World") as well as the editor of the book series Continente desaparecido ("The Disappeared Continent") published by Sperling & Kupfer, a group of publications focuses on the Latin American world and its authors. Minà himself published many books on Latin America.

In 2003, Minà was elected to the assembly of the Società Italiana Autori ed Editori (the Italian Authors and Publishers Association) and was a member of the committee that designs and produces Vivaverdi, the journal of Italian authors. In 2007, Minà received the Kamera Prize at the Berlin Film Festival for his lifetime's work.

== Biography ==
Born in Turin, Minà began his career as a journalist in 1959 with the sports newspaper Tuttosport, of which he was later editor-in-chief (1996–1998). In 1960, he began working with RAI (the Italian State Broadcasting Corporation) as a sports correspondent for the Olympic Games in Rome. In 1965, after working with the sports magazine Sprint, Minà made documentaries for a variety of RAI's television programmes, including Tv7, AZ, TG1 and TG2, Dribbling, Odeon and Gulliver.

In the mid-1970s, Minà was one of the creators of the TV show L'altra domenica ("The Other Sunday") together with Maurizio Barendson and Renzo Arbore. In 1976, after 17 years of freelancing, he was hired by TG2, then headed by Andrea Barbato, and began reporting on boxing, an activity that piqued his interest in American show business, social conflicts, and minority groups. Around that time, he also began reporting from Latin America, an event that would play a big role in defining his future career. Overall, Minà reported on eight world soccer championships and seven Olympic Games in addition to many world boxing championships, most notably those from the era of Muhammad Ali.

After taking part in two series of Giovanni Minoli's TV show Mixer, he debuted as an author and host of Blitz, an innovative show that ran on Sunday afternoons and which featured guests such as Federico Fellini, Eduardo De Filippo, Muhammad Ali, Robert De Niro, Jane Fonda, Betty Faria, Gabriel García Márquez, Enzo Ferrari, Nereo Rocco, Diego Maradona, Michel Platini, Carlos Monzon, Edwin Moses, Pietro Mennea. Minà followed Ali throughout his long-standing career and produced a documentary film, Cassius Clay, una storia Americana (Cassius Clay: An American Story), about the boxer.

In 1987, he interviewed Cuban President Fidel Castro for the first time. Their 16-hour meeting was later published as a book. The interview also served as the primary source for Fidel Racconta il Che (Fidel Talks About Che), a report in which the Cuban leader, for the first and only time, discusses the heroic deeds of Ernesto Che Guevara. In 1990, following the decline of communism, a second interview between Minà and Castro was held. The two interviews would later be brought together in the book Fidel. Gabriel García Márquez and Jorge Amado wrote the preface.

In 1991, Minà produced Alta Classe (High Class), a TV series profiling artists such as Ray Charles, Pino Daniele, Massimo Troisi, and Chico Buarque de Hollanda. He hosted La Domenica Sportiva (Sports Sunday) and created the in-depth investigative program Zona Cesarini. He produced Una storia del Jazz ("A History of Jazz"), a four-episode, program on folk music from Central and South America, as well as a sociological and technical history of boxing in 14 episodes entitled Facce piene di pugni (Faces Full of Fists).

In 1992, Minà produced a series of documentaries on Latin America:

- Storia di Rigoberta (Rigoberta's Story) on Rigoberta Menchú, winner of the Nobel Peace Prize (awarded in Vienna during the United Nations Summit on Human Rights)
- Immagini dal Chiapas – Marcos e l’insurrezione zapatista (Pictures from Chiapas – Marcos and the Zapatista Insurrection), presented at the Venice Film Festival in 1996
- Marcos: aquí estamos (Marcos: Here We Are), a two-episode report on the march of the Mayan indigenous people from Chiapas to Mexico City, featuring an exclusive interview with deputy commanding officer Marcos and conducted together with writer Manuel Vázquez Montalbán.
- Il Che quarant'anni dopo (Che Forty Years Later), inspired by the human and political life story of Ernesto Che Guevara.
- Il Papa e Fidel (The Pope and Fidel) A documentary on John Paul II's visit to Cuba, interspersed with Fidel Castro's account of that event to a group of North American editors and excerpts of the Pope's speeches at Santa Clara, Camageuy, Santiago and Havana.

From 1996 to 1998 he produced the television programme Storie (Stories), which featured such individuals as the Dalai Lama, Luis Sepúlveda, Martin Scorsese, Naomi Campbell, John F. Kennedy, and Pietro Ingrao. Two books were later published based on this programme. In 2001, Minà produced Maradona: non sarò mai un uomo comune (Maradona: I Will Never Be an Ordinary Man), a 70-minute confessional report with Diego Maradona at the end of the most painful year in the life of the former soccer player.

In 2004, Minà embarked on an eleven-year-long project based on the diaries of Ernesto Che Guevara and his friend, Alberto Granado, when they crossed Latin America by motorcycle in 1952. Guevara and Granado's journey began in Argentina and continued on through southern Chile, the Atacama Desert, the mines in Chuquicamata, the Peruvian Amazonia, Colombia and Venezuela. After collaborating on the film based on this adventure story (The Motorcycle Diaries), directed by Walter Salles and produced by Robert Redford and Michael Nozik), Minà produced the film In viaggio con il Che (Travels with Che) about the life of 80-year-old Alberto Granado. The film was screened at the Sundance Film Festival, the Berlinale, and the Film Festivals in Annecy, Morelia (Mexico), Valladolid, and Belgrade. It won as best documentary in the Montreal World Film Festival and was awarded the Nastro d'Argento (the Silver Filmstrip), the critics' prize, in Italy.

Minà had been a long-standing collaborator with several Italian newspapers, including La Repubblica, L'Unità, Corriere della Sera and Il Manifesto. He has also authored many books, including Continente desaparecido (The Disappeared Continent), which consisted of a series of interviews with Gabriel García Márquez, Jorge Amado, Eduardo Galeano, Rigoberta Menchú, mons. Samuel Ruiz, Frei Betto, Pombo and Urbano, friends of the late Che Guevara from Bolivia. This book later became the title of a series of non-fictional accounts on Latin America published by Sperling & Kupfer. In 2003, Minà wrote Un mondo migliore è possibile (A Better World Is Possible), an account of the ideas from the World Social Forum in Porto Alegre, Brazil, that was subsequently translated into Spanish, Portuguese and French. In 2005 he published Il continente desaparecido è ricomparso (The Disappeared Continent Has Reappeared), highlighting the new international political landscape as interpreted by Eduardo Galeano, Fernando Solanas, Venezuelan President Hugo Chávez, Brazilian singer-songwriter and Minister of Culture Gilberto Gil, as well as Arundhati Roy, Tarik Ali, Luis Sepúlveda, Paco Taibo II and theologians Leonardo Boff and François Houtart.

His latest written work, published by Sperling & Kupfer, is Politicamente scorretto, Riflessioni di un giornalista fuori dal coro ("Politically Incorrect: Reflections of a Dissonant Journalist"). It is a collection of articles previously published in La Repubblica, L'Unità, Il Manifesto and Latinoamerica, and represents an authentic source of alternative information on a wide range of contemporary events and controversies.

Minà was publisher and editor-in-chief of the literary journal Latinoamerica e tutti i sud del mondo (Latin America and All the Souths of the World), a geopolitical quarterly that features the writings of the most prestigious intellectuals from the American continent.

In 2007, together with GME Productions S.r.l., Rai Trade and La Gazzetta dello Sport, Minà published Maradona: Non sarò mai un uomo comune ("Maradona: I Will Never Be an Ordinary Man"). This ten-DVD set, which tells the story of the legendary Argentine soccer player, sold a record 1,200,000 copies, thereby becoming one of the most successful publication ventures in the last ten years.

In 2008, Le stagioni di Blitz ("The Blitz Seasons") was broadcast on Rai 3. This programme, in ten episodes, takes a second look at Minà's program, Blitz, which was originally broadcast during the 1983–1985 television season.

Minà filmed the documentary Cuba in the epoch of Obama, a long journey in a rebellious and controversial country, told through the voices of youths. One thousand kilometres from Havana to Santiago de Cuba and back, with the hopes, the disillusions and the dreams of the students in visit at the Che Guevara's mausoleum in Santa Clara or students of the Bayamo Art School, or the young people of the Brigade which watches the borders of the Guantanamo USA Naval Base, many of which will become Cuba's future doctors or filmmakers. The documentary had been introduced at the Venice Film Festival.

Minà died from heart disease on 27 March 2023, at the age of 84.

== Awards ==
- In 1981, President Sandro Pertini awarded Minà the Saint Vincent Prize as best television journalist of the year.
- In 2004, Minà won first prize in the documentary film section at the Montreal World Film Festival for In viaggio con il Che (Travels with Che).
- He also received the Silver Filmstrip Award in Italy. In the same year, he won the Flaiano Prize and the Vittorini Prize for television journalism.
- In 2007, Minà was awarded the Berlinale Kamera Career Prize for his collection of documentaries, Cuban Memories, at the Berlin Film Festival as well as the Lifetime Achievement Award at the Seville Film Festival.
- In 2010, Minà received the Vittorio Mezzogiorno Special Prize from Giovanna Mezzogiorno at the Giffoni Film Festival.

== Works ==
- Il racconto di Fidel (The Tale of Fidel), Milan, Mondadori, 1987. ISBN 88-04-30887-7
- Fidel. Presente e futuro di una ideologia in crisi analizzati da un leader storico (Fidel: The Present and Future of an Ideology in Crisis as Analyzed by a Historical Leader), Milan, Sperling & Kupfer 1991 ISBN 88-200-1154-9
- Un continente desaparecido (A Disappeared Continent), Milan, Sperling & Kupfer, 1995. ISBN 88-200-1783-0
- Fidel Castro. La sua vita, la sua avventura in due interviste storiche (Fidel Castro: His Life, His Adventure in Two Historic Interviews), Milan, Sperling & Kupfer, 1996. ISBN 88-200-2267-2
- Marcos e l’insurrezione zapatista (Marcos and the Zapatista Insurrection), with Jaime Avilés, Milan, Sperling & Kupfer, 1997. ISBN 88-200-2504-3
- Storie (Stories), Milan, Sperling & Kupfer-Rome, RAI-ERI, 1997. ISBN 88-200-2380-6
- Il papa e Fidel (The Pope and Fidel), Milan, Sperling & Kupfer, 1998. ISBN 88-200-2696-1
- Storie e miti dei Mondiali (Stories and Legends from the World Championships), with Darwin Pastorin, Modena, Panini, 1998. ISBN 88-7686-951-4
- Testimoni del tempo (Witnesses of Time), Milan, Sperling & Kupfer-Rome, RAI-ERI, 1999. ISBN 88-200-2709-7
- Un mondo migliore è possibile (A Better World Is Possible), Milan, Sperling & Kupfer, 2002. ISBN 88-200-3391-7
- Il continente desaparecido è ricomparso (The Disappeared Continent Has Reappeared), Milan, Sperling & Kupfer, 2005. ISBN 88-200-3554-5
- Politicamente scorretto. Riflessioni di un giornalista fuori dal coro (Politically Incorrect: Reflections of a Dissonant Journalist), Milan, Sperling & Kupfer, 2007. ISBN 978-88-200-4203-5
