= Buarque =

Buarque is a surname. Notable people with the surname include:

== Buarque de Hollanda ==
- Anna Maria Alvim Buarque de Hollanda or Ana de Hollanda (born 1948), Brazilian politician, Minister of Culture of Brazil from 2011 to 2012.
- Aurélio Buarque de Holanda Ferreira (1910–1989), Brazilian lexicographer, philologist, translator, and writer
- Chico Buarque (born 1944), Brazilian singer and guitarist
- Cristina Buarque (1950–2025), Brazilian singer and composer
- Heloísa Maria Buarque de Hollanda or Miúcha (1937–2018), Brazilian singer and composer
- Heloisa Buarque de Hollanda or Heloísa Teixeira (1939–2025), Brazilian writer, essayist, editor and literary critic
- Sérgio Buarque de Holanda (1902–1982), Brazilian writer
- Aurélio Buarque de Holanda Ferreira (1910–1989), Brazilian writer

== Other ==
- Cristovam Buarque (born 1944), Brazilian politician and university professor

== See also ==
- Hollanda (disambiguation)
