= Cálice =

1978 song by Chico Buarque and Milton Nascimento

Song by Chico Buarque and Milton Nascimento

from the album Chico Buarque
- Language: Portuguese
- Written: 1973
- Released: November 1978
- Studio: Phonogram Studios (Rio de Janeiro)
- Genre: MPB
- Length: 4:01
- Label: PolyGram
- Songwriters: Chico Buarque; Gilberto Gil
- Producer: Sérgio de Carvalho

Audio
- "Cálice" on YouTube

"Cálice" (Brazilian Portuguese pronunciation: [ˈkalisi]) is a song composed in 1973 by Brazilian musicians Chico Buarque and Gilberto Gil, officially released in 1978. Written during Brazil's military dictatorship, the song uses biblical imagery and word play—most notably a pun on cálice ('chalice') and cale-se ('shut up')—to critique state censorship and political repression while disguised under a religious theme.

The composition originated from an idea by Gil, inspired by the Passion of Christ and the biblical plea "Father, take this cup from me" (Pai, afasta de mim esse cálice). Buarque expanded the metaphor to include a direct political dimension, with its lyrics denouncing censorship, repression, and violence while expressing collective suffering and resistance. Combining MPB and rock music elements, the version released on Buarque's self-titled 1978 album features Milton Nascimento with additional vocals from the vocal group MPB4 and incorporates liturgical undertones and shifting vocal dynamics to mirror the progression from submission to defiance.

The song was banned by government censors upon completion, and an attempted live performance at the 1973 Phono 73 festival was forcibly interrupted by federal police. Following its official release in 1978, "Cálice" became a commercial and critical success, receiving extensive radio airplay. It has since been described as one of the most emblematic works of Brazilian popular music and a major cultural statement against the dictatorship.

== Background ==
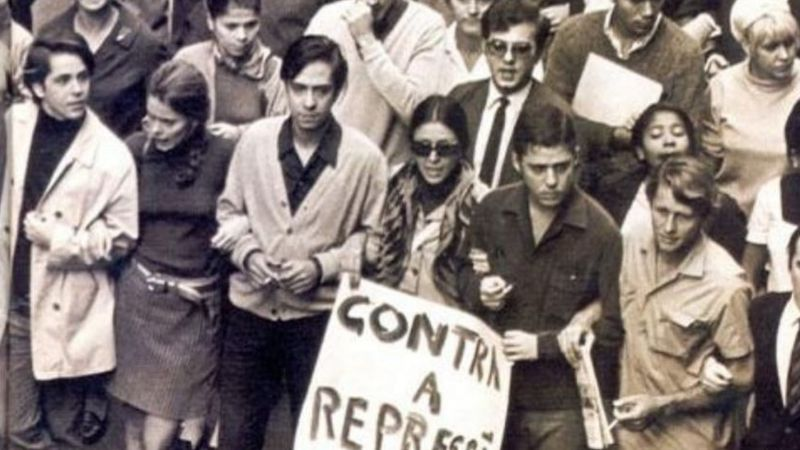
Chico Buarque (second one on the right) protesting against the government during the March of the One Hundred Thousand in 1968

"Cálice" was written in 1973 by Brazilian musicians Chico Buarque and Gilberto Gil during a period of heightened political repression in Brazil under the military dictatorship. The song was conceived during the dictatorship of Emílio Garrastazu Médici, a time marked by extensive censorship, state violence, and the implementation of the Institutional Act Number Five (AI-5), which curtailed civil liberties and increased authoritarian control. Many artists, including Gil and Caetano Veloso, were arrested or forced into exile. Buarque became a frequent target of censorship, with only one song approved for every three he submitted. In response, he occasionally used pseudonyms such as Julinho da Adelaide and Leonel Paiva to evade prior rejections, as works by previously censored composers were often rejected based solely on the artist's name. Songs with ambiguous or veiled criticisms of the regime, such as "Apesar de Você", drew increased scrutiny from censors, who in some cases resorted to destroying printed records and intensifying surveillance of artists.

== Composition and analysis ==
"Cálice"
A sample of the 1978 recording of "Cálice", illustrating the word play between cálice ('chalice') and cale-se ('shut up').

"Cálice" is a MPB song with elements of rock music. It symbolizes the outcry for liberation from oppression. The recording on Buarque's self-titled 1978 album was produced by Sérgio de Carvalho at Phonogram Studios in Rio de Janeiro using a 16-track format and the arrangement was handled by Magro, a member of the vocal group MPB4. Magro also played the piano. On Buarque's album, the song features vocals by Milton Nascimento as a special guest, with Miltinho (also from MPB4) on acoustic guitar. Luiz Cláudio Ramos contributed on guitar, while Bebeto played electric bass. Mário Negrão performed on drums, and MPB4 provided backing vocals.

The song's title carries a double entendre, functioning both as a reference to the biblical chalice (cálice) and as a homophone of the imperative verb cale-se ('shut up'), a word with a clear connection to censorship imposing silence and victimization. The song originated from an idea brought by Gil, who had written the refrain and an initial verse shortly after Good Friday, drawing on imagery from the Passion of Jesus. He was inspired particularly by the biblical plea "Father, take this cup from me" (Pai, afasta de mim esse cálice), which parallels the suffering experienced under authoritarian rule. Upon receiving Gil's draft, Buarque immediately noticed the homophony between cálice and cale-se and developed it into a political metaphor for repression and censorship under the dictatorship. The songwriting process involved two meetings between the artists, during which Gil wrote the first and third stanzas, while Buarque composed the other two.

=== Writing and structure ===
The lyrics of "Cálice" employ metaphor, wordplay, and ambiguity as mechanisms to circumvent censorship while articulating political dissent. The refrain "Pai, afasta de mim esse cálice" ('Father, take that chalice away from me') repeats throughout the piece and is taken from the Gospels (Mark 14:36, Matthew 26:39, Luke 22:42), evoking themes of sacrifice, suppression, and anguish. Buarque takes advantage of the homophony between the two Portuguese words to protest government censorship, disguised under a religious theme by referencing Jesus' Gethsemane prayer to be spared the cup of suffering. The line "De vinho tinto de sangue" ('Of blood red wine') further reinforces themes of violence and pain, representing the blood of citizens assassinated by the regime. The songwriters strategically employed the imagery of "wine" and "blood" to veil their political critique within a religious framework, referencing the crucifixion of Jesus, in which wine symbolizes his blood. The verse "Como beber dessa bebida amarga?" ('How to drink this bitter beverage?') serves as a metaphor for Brazil's repressive conditions under the military regime. The beverage, sacred in Christian liturgy, is symbolically replaced by the blood of innocent victims.

The contrast between the "filho da santa" ('son of the saint') and "filho da outra" ('son of the other woman') suggests a rejection of patriarchal and authoritarian structures, possibly implying stronger language through euphemism. Santa refers metaphorically to the Brazilian homeland, which is symbolically sanctified, while outra alludes to a mistress, representing dissatisfaction with the country's political situation under military rule. The substitution of outra for the expected vulgar term puta ('whore'), which would complete the common expression filho da puta ('son of a bitch'), suggests an intentional euphemism to avoid censorship. Expressions like "realidade menos morta" ('less dead reality') and "tanta força bruta" ('so much brute force') allude to the regime's authoritarianism. Lines such as "De muito gorda a porca já não anda / De muito usada a faca já não corta" ('The pig is too fat to walk / The knife is too used to cut') offer a veiled critique of institutional stagnation and inefficiency. The phrase "essa palavra presa na garganta" ('this word stuck in the throat') alludes to the suppression of free speech, while the persistence of thought and resistance is evoked by references to the mind (cuca), implying that intellectual opposition survives despite physical repression.

The verses "Quero cheirar fumaça de óleo diesel / Me embriagar até que alguém me esqueça" ('I want to inhale diesel smoke / Get drunk until someone forgets me') have been interpreted as an allusion to the torture and death of Stuart Angel Jones, a leftist militant and member of the resistance against Brazil's military dictatorship. According to testimonies, in June 1971, Jones was killed at age 25 after being tied to the back of a military jeep and dragged through the courtyard of the Galeão Air Force Base, with his mouth positioned near the exhaust pipe until he died from asphyxiation and injuries.

=== Musical characteristics ===
The 1978 recording opens with a chant-like introduction by the vocal group MPB4, resembling liturgical music, and is devoid of rhythm or percussion, establishing a solemn tone. This Gregorian-style passage progresses from monody to polyphony, a development interpreted by some scholars as a metaphor for class struggle and cultural resistance. The arrangement of "Cálice" introduced greater rhythmic definition, utilizing a 4/4 time signature. As the piece develops, Buarque and Nascimento deliver the verses with elongated vowels and rising melodies that reflect pleading and anguish. The refrain's ascending progression (G-sharp, A, B), combined with octave jumps, underscores the urgency of the plea Pai, afasta de mim esse cálice.

The song gradually shifts from a lamenting tone to one of growing defiance. The rhythmic pattern solidifies midway through, and the vocal delivery becomes more assertive. From the third stanza onward, MPB4 joins with emphatic interjections of Pai and Cálice, creating a counterpoint that dramatizes the conflict between silenced and defiant voices. The final four lines are performed a cappella, with the instrumental backing dropping out entirely, leaving an abrupt and isolated conclusion that sonically mimics the experience of censorship.

The instrumentation features sparse percussion and dark-toned guitar lines, particularly in an interlude before the third stanza. This section shifts the mood from sacred to disorienting, introducing an almost militaristic texture that evokes warlike tension. The stanzas are composed in decasyllables, alternating between Gil and Buarque with the vocal delivery respecting natural accentuation, adding to the lyric's rhythmic intensity.

== Release ==
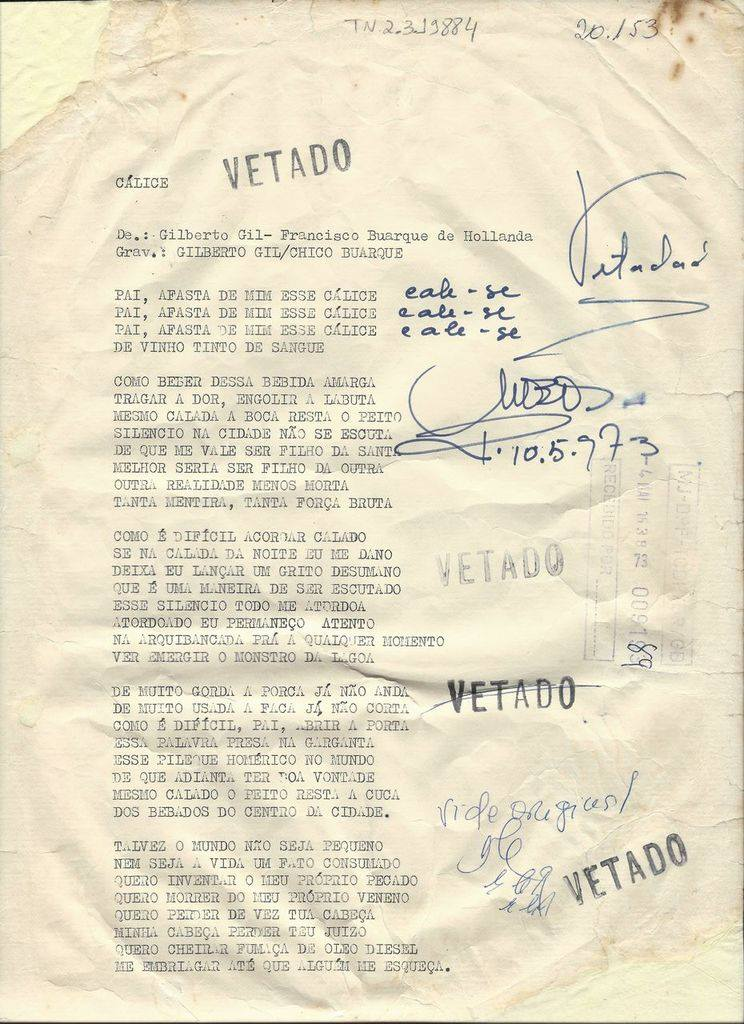
Lyrics of the song "Cálice", with vetado ('vetoed') stamps

After the song's completion, the label Phonogram submitted the song to the federal censorship bureau, which denied approval. The censorship of "Cálice" is documented in a surviving typescript dated 10 May 1973, signed by a government official. The document contains multiple indicators of prohibition: four rubber-stamped vetado ('vetoed') notations and an additional handwritten instance. Distinct from other banned compositions of the era, the typescript lacks any formal explanation for its rejection. Instead, the censor's handwritten annotations suggest an awareness of its underlying word play, particularly the homophony between cálice and cale-se; the latter was written beside the lyrics three times, indicating recognition of the song's veiled political message.

Despite this, the duo attempted a performance at the Phono 73 music festival organized by Phonogram on 11 May 1973, employing grammelots and fragmented lyrics to bypass censorship. As Buarque and Gil attempted to perform it, federal police intervened by entering the stage mid-performance and the sound from the five microphones on stage was cut off one by one, until Buarque was forced to abandon the performance. Visibly outraged, he continued with the songs "Cotidiano" and "Baioque", shouting at the end of the latter, off-microphone: "Fucking censorship!"

Although it was banned from official release, "Cálice" circulated informally. Gil performed it privately at venues such as the University of São Paulo, where it was met with repeated requests. Footage of the censored 1973 performance was later broadcast on Brazilian television Rede Bandeirantes on Christmas in 1978, shortly after the ban was lifted during a period of political liberalization and redemocratization.

The song was officially released in November 1978 on Buarque's self-titled album through PolyGram, with Milton Nascimento performing Gil's original stanzas and additional vocals from MPB4. At the time, Gil was transitioning from PolyGram to the competing label WEA, making it contractually unfeasible for him to participate in the recording.

== Reception and legacy ==
Upon its official release, "Cálice" quickly rose in popularity, receiving frequent airplay on Brazilian radio and even at international airports. Between December 1978 and February 1979, the song received over 1,500 broadcasts on AM radio and television, solidifying its status as a top-ten hit. An El Miami Herald article emphasized that some liberal priests supported the song's performance in churches, while members of the ecclesiastical hierarchy, such as Archbishop Gaudêncio Ramos of Belém, denounced it as "deeply anti-Christian" and prohibited it in their dioceses. J. D. Considine from The Baltimore Sun called the song "hauntingly lovely". In 1983, Italian critic Paolo Scarnecchia described "Cálice" as "one of the most beautiful compositions by the carioca, if not the absolutely most beautiful".

Retrospectively, the song was received favorably in gshow, whose writer regarded it as an "anthem of resistance against the military dictatorship". "Cálice" is widely recognized for its artistic quality and for its symbolic role as a protest song during Brazil's military dictatorship. Philip Jandovský of AllMusic identified "Cálice" as the most prominent track on the album, describing it as "very beautiful" despite differing from the more traditional tracks in the album. In 1978, Maria Bethânia also recorded a version of the song for her album Álibi. Lívia Nolla, a singer and music researcher, highlighted the song's enduring relevance and cathartic impact, describing how contemporary audiences continue to react with deep emotion during performances, often chanting slogans like "Sem Anistia!" ('No Amnesty!') in response to its themes of repression and censorship. Its critical reception and subsequent legacy have established it as one of the most significant works in MPB. In 2010, rapper Criolo released a reinterpretation of the song on YouTube that incorporated lyrics addressing modern issues such as drug trafficking and violence in Brazil's favelas. Buarque acknowledged the homage by performing "Rap de Cálice" during his 2011 tour, remarking that he and Gil had been "welcomed to the club" by the hip-hop community. In August 2025, Buarque and Gil, through Sony Publishing, sued the Argentine-American musician Paz Lenchantin, for allegedly plagiarizing "Cálice" in her single "Hang Tough".

== Personnel ==
According to Maria Luiza Kfouri and the album's liner notes.

- Chico Buarque – composer
- Gilberto Gil – composer
- Milton Nascimento – lead vocals (guest)
- Sérgio de Carvalho – production
- Bebeto – electric bass
- Luiz Cláudio Ramos – guitar
- Magro (MPB4) – piano, arrangement
- Miltinho (MPB4) – acoustic guitar
- Mário Negrão – drums
- MPB4 – backing vocals
