= Censorship under the military dictatorship in Brazil =

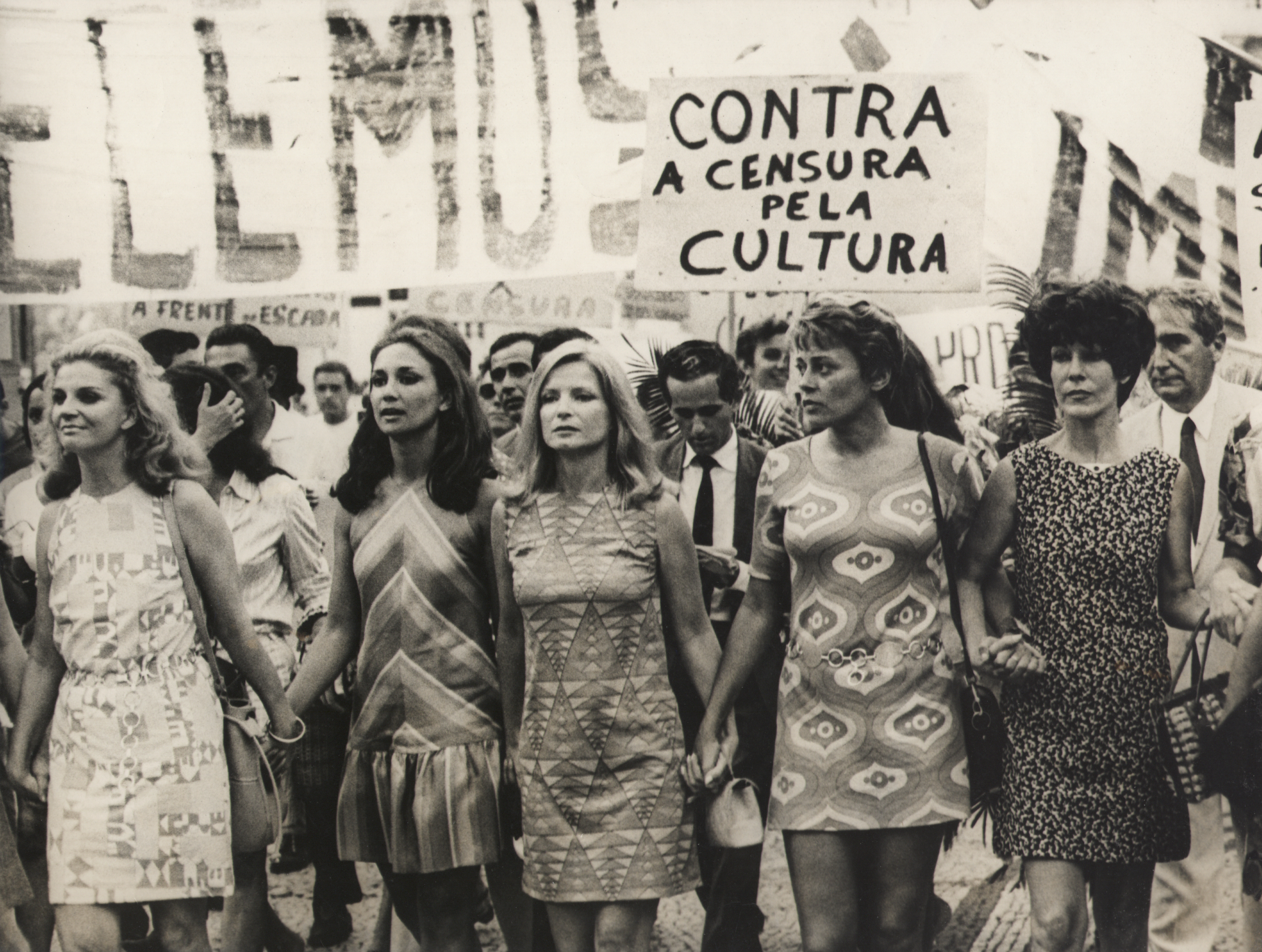
The Cultura contra Censura protest February 1968. In this photo: Tônia Carrero, Eva Wilma, Odete Lara, Norma Bengell and Cacilda Becker.

The 1964–1985 military dictatorship in Brazil engaged in censorship of media, artists, journalists, and others it deemed "subversive", "dangerous", or "immoral". The political system installed by the 1964 coup d'état also set out to censor material that went against what it called moral e bons costumes ('morality and good manners').

The government prohibited the production and circulation of such material. In addition to foreign books and authors, especially those social and political in nature, about 140 books by Brazilian authors were forbidden by the state in that period, covering both fiction and non-fiction. Among these Brazilian authors there were Érico Veríssimo, Jorge Amado, Darcy Ribeiro, Rubem Fonseca, Caio Prado Júnior, Celso Furtado, Ignácio de Loyola Brandão, Dalton Trevisan, Maria da Conceição Tavares, Olympio Mourão Filho, and others.

== History ==
At the beginning of the military dictatorship, between the coup in 1964 and Institutional Act Number Five in 1968, censorship involved confiscation initiatives with physical coercion by poorly trained agents at random checkpoints.

Throughout the dictatorship, the hierarchical structure of organs involved in censorship went through transformations. The Serviço de Censura de Diversões Públicas was originally established 26 December 1945, under Getúlio Vargas. With the aim of centralizing censorship activities and standardizing directives, the Divisão de Censura de Diversões Públicas (DCDP) was created 2 June 1972, as part of the Federal Police of Brazil, subordinate to the Ministry of Justice and Public Security.

Ênio Silveira, editor of Civilização Brasileira, was jailed and tried several times; in May 1965, his arrest prompted a petition signed by about a thousand people working in culture.

The constitution of 1967 made censorship an official, centralized activity of the federal government in Brasília.

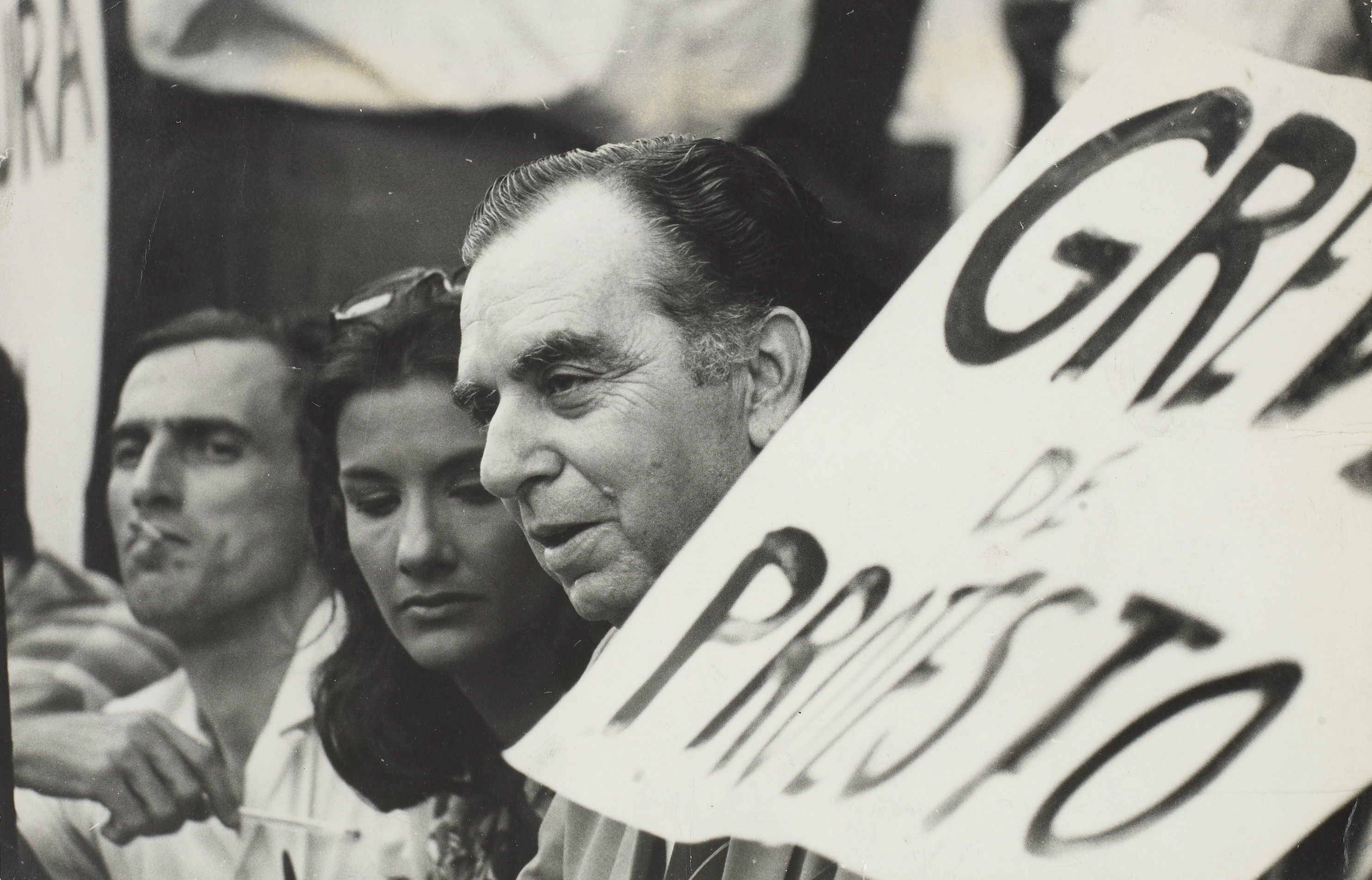
Nelson Rodrigues at the 1968 Cultura contra Censura protest.

Two protests against the military dictatorship precipitated the AI-5: the Cultura contra Censura protest against the prohibition of eight plays in February 1968 and the March of the One Hundred Thousand in June of that year.

On 13 December 1968, the Institutional Act Number Five was announced in the name of "authentic democratic order [...] (and) the combat of subversion and of the ideologies contrary to the traditions of our people", creating conditions under which disclosure of information, manifesting opinions, and cultural and artistic production were subjected to censorship.

The death of journalist Vladimir Herzog in 1975 is considered a turning point in the process of Brazil's re-democratization. The military regime promulgated a narrative that Herzog had committed suicide, but evidence indicated that the suicide had been staged, leading to public protest against the military government and its methods of covering up torture, including a weeklong strike by 30,000 university students and professors.

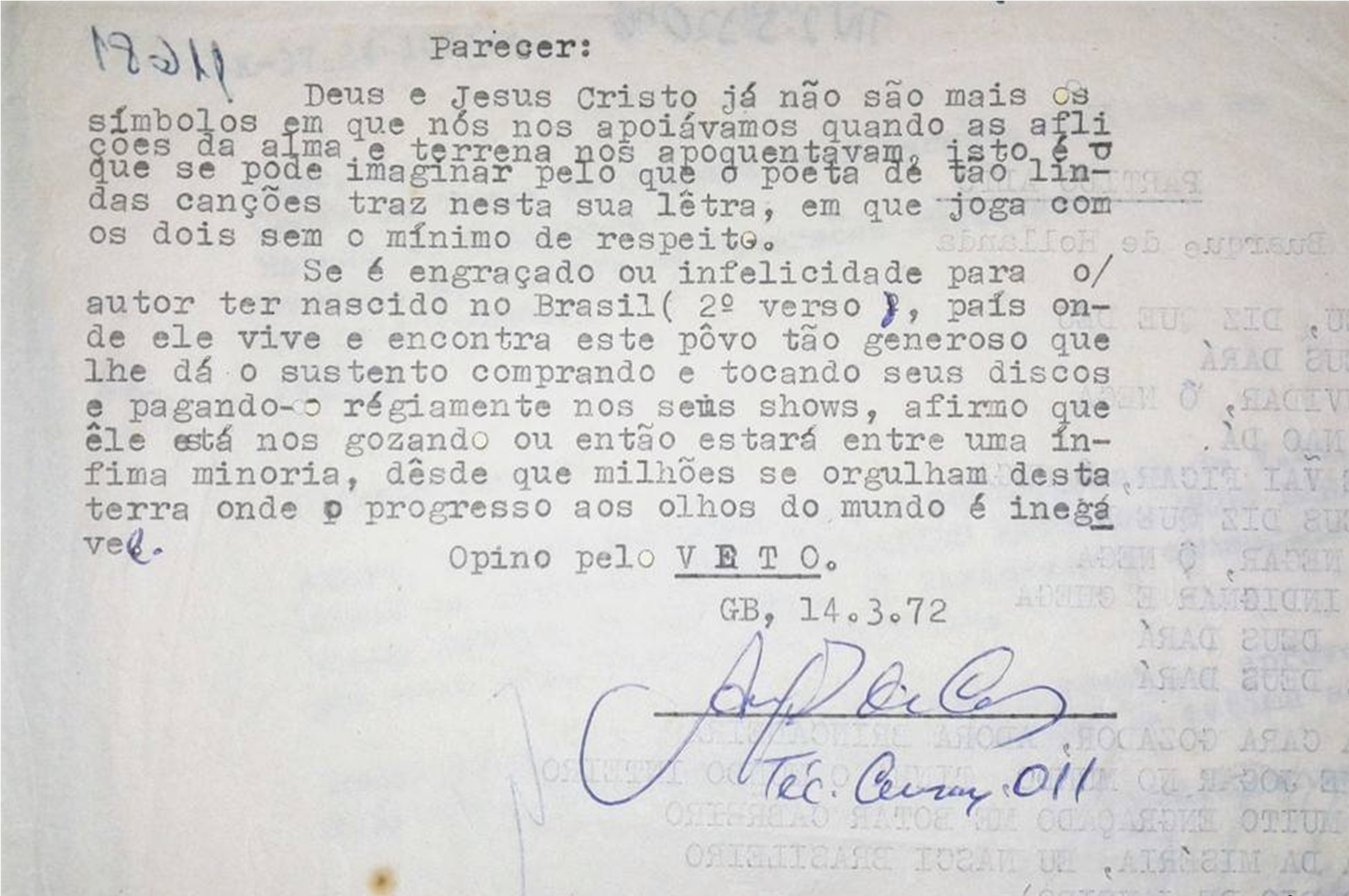
Opinion of the censor recommending the prohibition of Chico Buarque's song "Partido Alto" in 1972.

The January 1977 Manifesto dos Intelectuais 'Petition of the Intellectuals' led by Lygia Fagundes Telles, with over a thousand signatures against the dictatorship, was delivered to the Ministry of Justice in Brasília and broke the momentum of the censors.

On 13 October 1978, Constitutional Amendment No. 11 revoked the AI-5, effective 1 January 1979. Zuenir Ventura estimates that in the decade in which the AI-5 was in effect, approximately 500 films, 450 theatrical plays, 200 books, dozens of radio programs, 100 magazines, over 500 song lyrics and a dozen telenovela titles and pilots were censored.

== Notable cases ==
Caetano Veloso and Gilberto Gil were arrested 27 December 1968—days after AI-5 was announced—under the false accusation of having performed a parody of the Brazilian National Anthem to the tune of "Tropicália" at the Sucata club in Rio de Janeiro. They joined a number of Brazilian artists who lived in exile during the military dictatorship.

== Resistance ==
Some artists responded to the climate of censorship and repression by cleverly disguising subversive messages in their work. Notable examples include Geraldo Vandré's 1968 "Pra Não Dizer que Não Falei das Flores" as well as Chico Buarque's 1970 "Apesar de Você" and 1973 "Cálice".

Some newspapers adopted strategies—such as printing excerpts from Luís de Camões's 16th-century Os Lusíadas or cake recipes calling for 1 kilogram (2.2 lb) of salt—to indicate to readers that the content in those sections had been censored. So much material was censored from O Estado de S. Paulo between December 1969 and January 1975 that it printed all 8,116 verses of the Lusíadas twice over.
