= Chico Buarque (1978 album) =

Studio album by Chico Buarque
- Released: November 1978
- Genres: MPB, samba
- Length: 32:53
- Label: Phonogram Inc./Philips Records
- Producer: Sérgio de Carvalho

Chico Buarque chronology
| Gota d'água (1977) | Chico Buarque (1978) | Ópera do Malandro (1979) |

Professional ratings
Review scores
| Source | Rating |
|---|---|
| AllMusic | 4/5 stars |

Chico Buarque, occasionally referred to as Samambaia (Portuguese for 'fern'), is an album by Chico Buarque, released on November 1978 through PolyGram. The album includes hits such as "Cálice", "Pedaço de Mim" and "Apesar de Você", and features participations by several Brazilian artists, such as Milton Nascimento, Elba Ramalho, Marieta Severo and Zizi Possi.

The album had 30,000 copies pre-ordered by record stores and received a gold certification from the ABPD in 1979 for sales exceeding 150,000 copies. According to the magazine Manchete on 15 March 1980, after the lifting of censorship on "Cálice", the album sold 700,000 copies in Brazil.

== Track listing ==
| No. | Title | Writer(s) | Length |
|---|---|---|---|
| 1. | "Feijoada Completa" | Chico Buarque | 2:49 |
| 2. | "Cálice" (featuring Milton Nascimento) | Buarque; Gilberto Gil | 4:00 |
| 3. | "Trocando em Miúdos" | Buarque; Francis Hime | 2:49 |
| 4. | "O Meu Amor" (featuring Elba Ramalho and Marieta Severo) | Buarque | 4:00 |
| 5. | "Homenagem ao Malandro" | Buarque | 2:59 |
| 6. | "Até o Fim" | Buarque | 2:23 |
| 7. | "Pedaço de Mim" (featuring Zizi Possi) | Buarque | 3:14 |
| 8. | "Pivete" | Buarque; Hime | 2:27 |
| 9. | "Pequeña Serenata Diurna" | Silvio Rodríguez | 2:21 |
| 10. | "Tanto Mar" | Buarque | 1:53 |
| 11. | "Apesar de Você" | Buarque | 3:53 |
| Total length: | | | 32:53 |

== Personnel ==
According to Maria Luiza Kfouri and album's liner notes.

- Chico Buarque: vocals (except on "O Meu Amor") and acoustic guitar (on "Até o Fim")
- MPB-4: choir (on "Cálice" and "Apesar de Você")
  - Magro: piano (on "Cálice" and "Homenagem ao Malandro")
  - Miltinho: acoustic guitar (on "Cálice", "Homenagem ao Malandro" and "Apesar de Você")
- Quarteto em Cy: vocals (on "Apesar de Você")
- Francis Hime: piano (on "Feijoada Completa", "Trocando em Miúdos", "O Meu Amor", "Pivete" and "Pequeña Serenata Diurna")
- Novelli: piano (on "Até o Fim"), bass (on "Pedaço de Mim" and "Pequeña Serenata Diurna") and percussion (on "Até o Fim")
- Manoel da Conceição (Mão de vaca): acoustic guitar (on "Feijoada Completa")
- Neco (Daudeth Azevedo): 7-string acoustic guitar (on "Feijoada Completa")
- Arthur Verocai: acoustic guitar (on "O Meu Amor")
- Jorge Lima: acoustic guitar (on "O Meu Amor")
- Nelson Angelo: acoustic guitar (on "Até o Fim" and "Pedaço de Mim")
- Octávio Burnier Bonfá: acoustic guitar (on "Pivete")
- Luiz Cláudio Ramos: electric guitar (on "Cálice"), acoustic guitar (on "Pequeña serenata diurna" and "Tanto Mar") and viola (on "Tanto Mar")
- Bebeto (Adalberto José Castilho e Souza): bass (on "Cálice", "Homenagem ao Malandro and "Apesar de Você")
- Luizão Maia: bass (on "O Meu Amor" and "Pivete")
- Beto Guedes: bass (on "Até o Fim") and mandolin (on "Pedaço de Mim")
- Jorginho da Flauta (Jorge Ferreira da Silva): flute (on "Feijoada Completa" and "Trocando em Miúdos") and alto saxophone (on "Homenagem ao Malandro")
- Celso Woltzenlogel: flute (on "Trocando em Miúdos", "O Meu Amor" and "Pivete")
- Copinha (Nicolino Cópia): flute (on "O Meu Amor")
- Franklin Corrêa da Silva (Franklin da Flauta): flute (on "O Meu Amor" and "Tanto Mar")
- Márcio Montarroyos: trumpet (on "Feijoada Completa", "O Meu Amor" and "Pivete")
- Formiga (José Pinto): trumpet (on "Pivete")
- Netinho: clarinet (on "Feijoada Completa") and soprano saxophone (on "Pequeña Serenata Diurna")
- Jayme Araújo: clarinet (on "O Meu Amor" and "Pivete")
- Marko Rupe: clarinet (on "O Meu Amor" and "Homenagem ao Malandro")
- Raul de Barros: trombone (on "Feijoada Completa")
- Edmundo Maciel: trombone (on "O Meu Amor", "Homenagem ao Malandro" and "Pivete")
- Jessé Sadoc do Nascimento: trombone (on "Pivete")
- João Luiz Macial: trombone (on "Pivete")
- Bijú (Moacir M. da Silva): tenor saxophone (on "Homenagem ao Malandro")
- Mário Negrão: drums (on "Cálice", "Homenagem ao Malandro" and "Apesar de Você")
- Pedrinho: drums (on "O Meu Amor" and "Pivete")
- Chico Batera: drums (on "Até o Fim") and percussion (on "O Meu Amor", "Até o Fim" and "Pivete")
- Enéas Costa: drums (on "Pequeña Serenata Diurna")
- Ricardo Costa: drums (on "Tanto Mar")
- Alceu Maia: cavaquinho (on "Feijoada Completa")
- Doutor: repenique (on "Feijoada Completa")
- Elizeu Felix: tambourine (on "Feijoada Completa")
- Luna: tambourine (on "Feijoada Completa")
- Marçal (Nilton Delfino Marçal): tambourine (on "Feijoada Completa")
- Esdras Ferreira (Nenen): cuíca (on "Feijoada Completa" and "Apesar de Você")
- Geraldo: whistle (on "Feijoada Completa")
- Gordinho (Antenor Marques Filho): surdo (on "Feijoada Completa" and "Apesar de Você")
- Wilson Canegal: ganzá (on "Feijoada Completa")
- Wilson das Neves: snare drum (on "Feijoada Completa") and agogô (on "Feijoada Completa")
- Armando Marçal (Marçalzinho): tambourine (on "Apesar de Você")
- Elias Ferreira: pandeiro (on "Homenagem ao Malandro" and "Apesar de Você")
- Djalma Corrêa: percussion (on "O Meu Amor" and "Pivete")
- Dom Chacal: percussion (on "O Meu Amor" and "Pivete")

Special guests

- Milton Nascimento: vocals (on "Cálice") and piano (on "Pedaço de Mim")
- Elba Ramalho: vocals (on "O Meu Amor")
- Marieta Severo: vocals (on "O Meu Amor")
- Zizi Possi: vocals (on "Pedaço de Mim")

== Certifications ==
| Region | Certification | Certified units/sales |
|---|---|---|
| Brazil (Pro-Música Brasil) | Gold | 100,000^{‡} |
^{^} Shipments figures based on certification alone.

== Sources ==
- Charles A. Perrone, Masters of Contemporary Brazilian Song: MPB 1965-1985. Austin : University of Texas Press, 1989. Chapter 2.
