= Phono 73 =

Brazilian musical festival

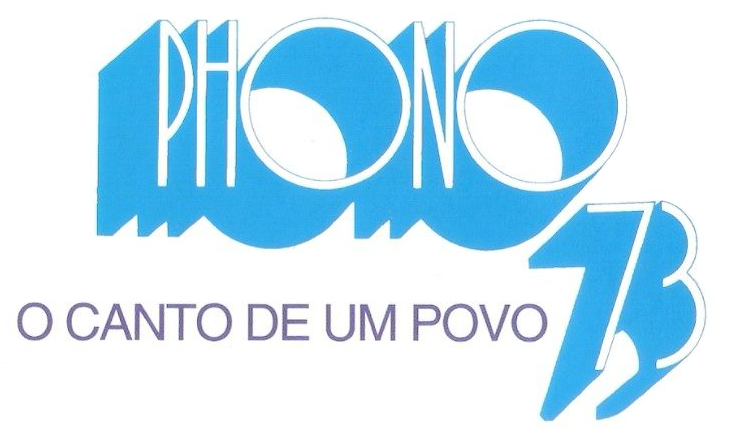
- Genre: MPB
- Dates: 10–13 May 1973
- Locations: São Paulo, Brazil
- Founders: Phonogram

Phono 73 was a music festival held at the Anhembi Convention Center in São Paulo from 10 to 13 May 1973. Organised by Phonogram, it featured nearly all artists under the label's contract.

Originally conceived as a marketing event to promote the label's catalogue, the festival acquired strong political undertones due to Brazil's military dictatorship at the time. The most notable act of censorship occurred when Chico Buarque and Gilberto Gil had their microphones cut off by government inspectors, who feared the duo would perform their newly composed song "Cálice". Other participants included Raul Seixas, Elis Regina, Gal Costa, MPB4, Caetano Veloso, Wilson Simonal, and Jorge Ben.

The event was documented in the triple LP Phono 73 – O canto de um povo, reissued as a double CD in 1997. In 2005, the Phono 73 box set was released, containing two CDs and a DVD compiled from previously unreleased 35 mm footage filmed by director Guga de Oliveira.

== Production ==
In the early 1970s, Phonogram possessed one of Brazil's largest rosters of popular artists, a fact the label frequently promoted—such as when it published a double-page advertisement in the centre of Manchete magazine featuring all its executives and signed musicians under the title "Só nos falta o Roberto" ("Only Roberto is missing"), referencing Roberto Carlos. Building on this promotional strategy and encouraged by sales of the album Caetano e Chico Juntos e Ao Vivo, the label planned an event to musically showcase its catalogue's diversity while creating new collaborations among its artists.

Festival production was overseen by André Midani (Phonogram's president) and Armando Pittigliani (PR director), with Manoel Carlos and Guilherme Araújo handling show direction and executive production. Tickets were sold at affordable prices through over 50 São Paulo record stores starting April 1973. The label aimed to recoup its investment through LP releases and a planned documentary based on the festival. International press advertisements prematurely announced a 12-hour film (which never materialised) and participation by artists like Tim Maia and Tom Jobim—who ultimately did not perform.

== The festival ==
Phono 73 was held at the Anhembi Convention Center in São Paulo from 10 to 13 May 1973. The opening night (10 May) featured an "open concert" with Rita Lee, Lúcia Turnbull, and Os Mutantes—the only program without established production, direction, or script. Occurring during the peak repression of Brazil's military dictatorship, the event inevitably acquired political dimensions, heightened by participation of recently returned exiles like Chico Buarque, Caetano Veloso, and Gilberto Gil. Unlike major Brazilian music festivals, this was not a competition; Phonogram's concept required each musician to perform two past hits and one new song, plus collaborate with a labelmate of contrasting genre.

Notable collaborations included Gilberto Gil and Jorge Ben (later formalized on Gil & Jorge: Ogum, Xangô), while Odair José and Veloso's pairing proved controversial. Booed by the middle class audience for featuring the "singer of maids", Veloso left the stage indignantly before returning to complete "Vou Tirar Você Desse Lugar", declaring: "Nothing is more Z than class A". Elis Regina also faced boos due to her recent performance at Army Olympics, but won applause after an emotional rendition of "Cabaré".

The most politically charged moment came when Gilberto Gil and Chico Buarque attempted to perform their newly composed "Cálice". As they began, all five stage microphones were cut one-by-one by censors. Buarque proceeded with "Cotidiano" and "Baioque", shouting off-mic afterward: "Censorship, you son of a bitch!" He later threatened to leave the label, prompting Phonogram to issue a press release blaming two government inspectors.

== Results ==
Plagued by technical and organizational issues, the festival faced criticism for gate delays and poor sound quality at Anhembi. Journalist Walter Silva suggested in Folha that many artists might follow Buarque's lead—not due to censorship, but production failures.

Phonogram estimated costs at $165,000 USD (1973 value), with ticket sales reaching only $30,000. Though producers hoped record sales would offset losses, PR director Pittigliani argued the event's publicity value exceeded expenses.

Three LPs of festival highlights were released on 21 May 1973, with Volume 3 remaining on Folha's bestseller list until mid-August. An ambitious box set proposal—featuring hundreds of photos and five discs capturing full backstage dialogues—was abandoned. The material was reissued as a double CD in 1997, and in 2005 Universal Music released a box set with two CDs and a DVD containing 35 minutes of footage filmed by Guga de Oliveira.
