= Apesar de Você =

1970 song by Chico Buarque

Song by Chico Buarque

from the album Chico Buarque
- Language: Portuguese
- Written: 1970
- Released: November 1978
- Studio: Phonogram Studios (Rio de Janeiro)
- Genre: Samba
- Length: 3:53
- Label: Philips
- Songwriter: Chico Buarque
- Producer: Sérgio de Carvalho

Audio
- "Apesar de Você" on YouTube

"Apesar de Você" (pronounced [apeˈza(ʁ) d͡ʒi voˈse]; Portuguese for 'In Spite of You') is a song by the Brazilian singer and composer Chico Buarque.

== Background ==
Brazil's military dictatorship began after the 1964 Brazilian coup d'état, which overthrew president João Goulart. By 1968, Chico Buarque was considered one of the leading figures of música popular brasileira (MPB), having won festivals with songs such as "A Banda" and "Roda Viva". On 13 December 1968, the government issued the Institutional Act Number Five (AI-5), which suspended constitutional guarantees, empowered the executive to close the National Congress, and introduced prior censorship of artistic works. Many artists, including Gilberto Gil and Caetano Veloso, were arrested or forced into exile. In January 1969, Buarque left for Italy with his wife, actress Marieta Severo, and their infant daughter. During his 14-month stay in Rome, he recorded with Ennio Morricone and performed alongside Toquinho and Josephine Baker, although he later recalled encountering financial difficulties and limited opportunities for Brazilian musicians in Europe. Buarque received a warning from Veloso advising him not to return to Brazil, but he and his family ultimately decided to do so on 20 March 1970.

After returning, Buarque encountered what he later described as a much heavier political atmosphere than the one he had left. Brazil was then under the presidency of Emílio Garrastazu Médici, during one of the dictatorship's most repressive phases. Following Brazil's victory in the 1970 FIFA World Cup, the military government promoted an intense patriotic campaign of boosterism through slogans such as "Brasil: Ame-o ou deixe-o" ('Brazil: Love it or leave it') and nationalist songs including "Pra Frente Brasil" ('Onward Brazil') and "Eu Te Amo, Meu Brasil" ('I Love you, my Brazil') were widely disseminated through the media. Buarque stated that experiencing this political climate upon his return prompted him to write what he described as a "true protest song". "Apesar de Você" was written in 1970 by Buarque following his return to Brazil after a period of self-imposed exile in Italy. The song was composed in response to the political climate of the time, when Brazil was under the military dictatorship and experienced widespread repression, torture, and censorship following the implementation of the AI-5.

== Composition ==
=== Overview ===
"Apesar de Você" is a samba song. The song combines an upbeat and extroverted musical style with lyrics that address authority, repression, and the prospect of political change. The recording on Buarque's self-titled 1978 album was produced by Sérgio de Carvalho at Phonogram Studios in Rio de Janeiro using a 16-track format and the arrangement was handled by Magro, a member of the vocal group MPB4. Miltinho (also from MPB4) contributed on acoustic guitar, while Bebeto played electric bass. Mário Negrão performed on drums, and MPB4 provided backing vocals.

On Buarque's album, the song features a fade-in opening chorus performed by MPB4 and backing vocals from the Brazilian girl group Quarteto em Cy alongside Buarque, creating the impression of a gradually assembling collective voice. Compositionally, the song alternates between verses describing current oppression—often performed with subdued tones or minor-key inflections—and a major-key refrain that projects a sense of future hope and victory.

=== Lyrics and themes ===
The song addresses an unnamed você ('you'). At a literal level, the song's lyrics were lightly disguised as those of a spurned lover, expressing bitterness and a desire for revenge. However, critics and listeners widely interpreted the unnamed você as a metaphor for the Brazilian military regime during the presidency of Médici. Buarque wrote the lyrics with deliberate ambiguity, allowing them to be interpreted either as the lament of a couple with a strained relationship or as a critique of the military dictatorship. The opening lines "Hoje você é quem manda / Falou, tá falado / Não tem discussão" ('Today you are the one in charge / What you say goes / There is no discussion') directly references the rigid authoritarianism of the period and the silencing of civil rights following the AI-5.

== Release and reception ==
Before submitting the song to the federal censorship bureau, Buarque discussed it with poet Manuel Bandeira and producer Manuel Barenbein. Barenbein reportedly believed the song would only be rejected if censors detected its hidden political meaning. The censor assigned to the work approved its release after failing to identify their intended meaning. It was issued in late 1970 as a 7-inch single by Philips Records, backed with "Desalento" on the B-side. The record sold approximately 100,000 copies shortly after release and received extensive radio airplay. "Apesar de Você" debuted at number 9 at the IBOPE charts of São Paulo on 2 February 1971, reported by the American magazine Billboard.

In early 1971, journalists began publishing hints about the song's hidden message; Nina Chavs noted in O Globo that the song had a "message", and Sebastião Nery of Tribuna da Imprensa reported that students were singing it like a "national anthem". Jornal do Brasil published an article speculating that the song's unnamed "you" referred to president Médici. On 7 May 1971, the authorities banned the song from radio broadcasts and public performance. Military agents confiscated copies from retailers and ordered the destruction of remaining stock at the Philips/Phonogram pressing plant. The censor who had approved the song was punished for the oversight. Singer Clara Nunes, who had recorded a cover version before the ban believing it to be a song about lovers, was required to perform the "Army Olympics Hymn" at the opening ceremony of the 1971 Army Olympics to demonstrate that her recording had not been politically motivated.

Despite the prohibition, "Apesar de Você" continued to circulate through privately copied tapes and was frequently performed at opposition gatherings such as a 1974 PMDB event. Following the gradual political redemocratization of the military regime, the ban was lifted. The song was officially released in November 1978 on Buarque's self-titled album through PolyGram. Retrospectively, Philip Jandovský of AllMusic described "Apesar de Você" as "classic and beautiful". Scholar Charles A. Perrone described it as an example of Buarque's use of the "samba-duplex" form, in which political commentary is embedded within the conventions of popular samba.

== Personnel ==
According to Maria Luiza Kfouri and the album's liner notes.

- Chico Buarque – composer
- Sérgio de Carvalho – production
- Magro (MPB4) – arrangement
- Miltinho (MPB4) – acoustic guitar
- Bebeto – electric bass
- Mário Negrão – drums
- Armando Marçal – tamborim
- Elias Ferreira – pandeiro
- Esdra Ferreira – cuíca
- Gordinho (Antenor Marques Filho) – surdo
- MPB4 – choir
- Quarteto em Cy – backing vocals

== Charts ==
Weekly charts for "Apesar de Você"
Country — Chart (1971)	Peak position
Brazil's Singles – Rio de Janeiro (IBOPE)	8
Brazil's Singles – São Paulo (IBOPE)	4
