= Otávio Gouveia de Bulhões =

Brazilian economist

Otávio de Bulhões
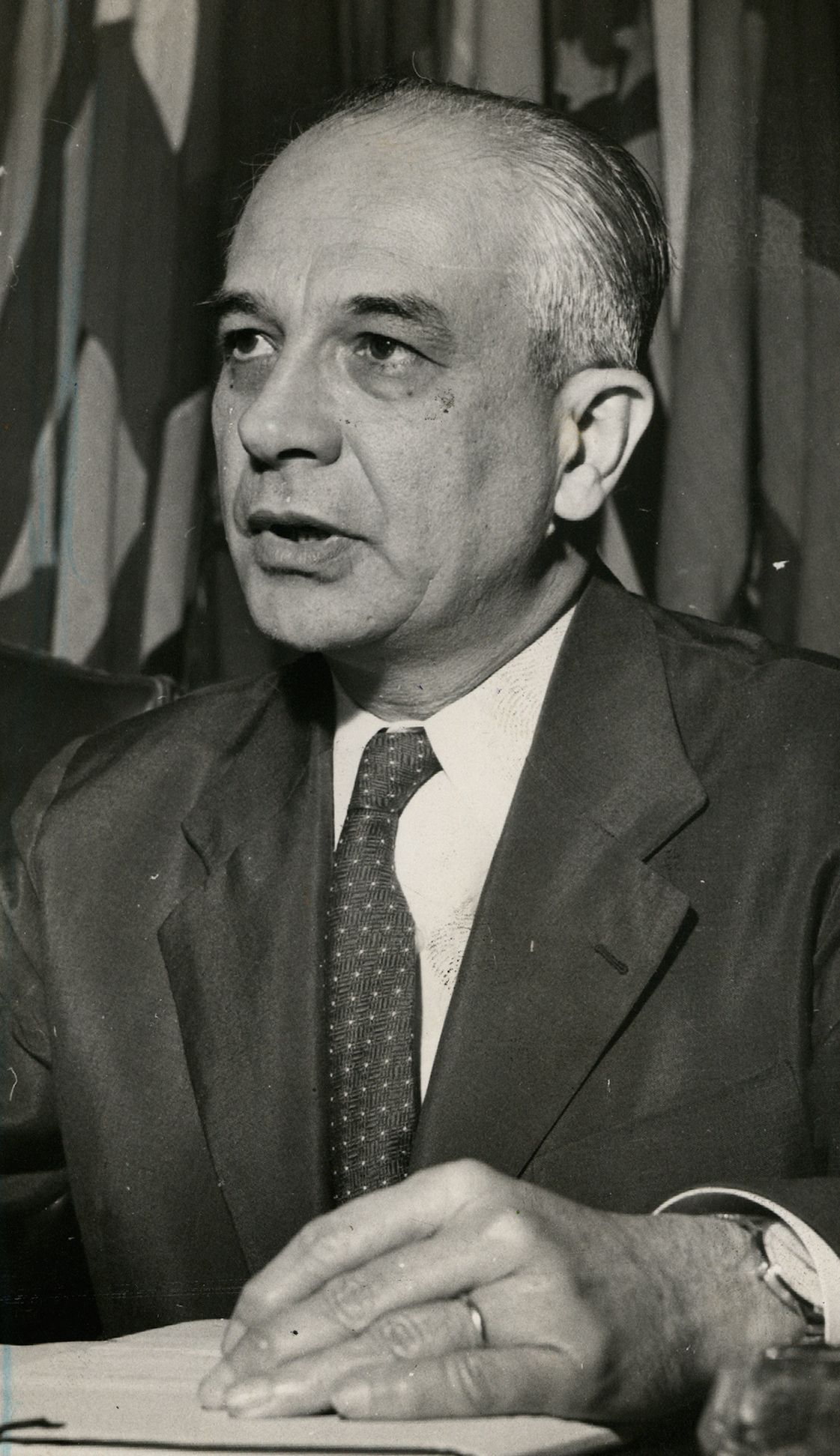

Minister of Finance
- In office 4 April 1964 – 15 March 1967
- President: Ranieri Mazzilli (acting); Castelo Branco
- Preceded by: Ney Neves Galvão
- Succeeded by: Delfim Netto

Ministry of Industry and Trade
- In office 4 April 1964 – 15 April 1964
- President: Ranieri Mazzilli (acting)
- Preceded by: Egídio Michaelsen
- Succeeded by: Daniel Faraco

Executive Director of the Superintendency of Currency and Credit
- In office February 1961 – January 1963
- President: Jânio Quadros; João Goulart
- Preceded by: Francisco Vieira de Alencar
- Succeeded by: Júlio de Sousa Avelar
- In office September 1954 – May 1955
- President: Café Filho
- Preceded by: José Soares Maciel Filho
- Succeeded by: Prudente de Morais Neto

Personal details
- Born: 7 January 1906 Rio de Janeiro, Federal District, Brazil
- Died: 13 October 1990 (aged 84) Rio de Janeiro, Rio de Janeiro, Brazil
- Education: National Faculty of Law
- Occupation: Economist, lawyer

Otávio Gouveia de Bulhões (7 January 1906 – 13 October 1990) was a Brazilian economist and lawyer. A key figure behind the foundation of the Central Bank of Brazil, he served as Minister of Finance as well as Minister of Industry and Commerce under Brazil's military dictatorship.

== Biography ==
Born in Rio de Janeiro, Bulhões was the son of a diplomat. He spent his early years in Austria and France, returning to Brazil to enroll at the National Faculty of Law, from which he graduated. He completed his education at the American University, where he studied economy, a subject he taught at the University of Brazil. His academic activity earned him the title of professor emeritus from Fundação Getulio Vargas.
