= Antônio Castilho de Alcântara Machado =

Brazilian journalist, politician, and writer

Antônio de Alcântara Machado
- Born: May 25, 1901; São Paulo, Brazil
- Died: April 14, 1935 (aged 33); Rio de Janeiro, Brazil
- Occupation: Writer

Antônio Castilho de Alcântara Machado de Oliveira (May 25, 1901 – April 14, 1935) was a Brazilian journalist, literary critic, politician and writer. He didn't take part of the Week of Modern Art (1922) in São Paulo, but even though wrote a great many modernist chronicles and short stories and also an unfinished novel. Antônio de Alcântara Machado's extensive correspondence with journalist Prudente de Moraes Neto was published in 1997.

== Bibliography ==
- Terra Roxa e Outras Terras
- Pathé-Baby, chronicle, 1926
- Brás, Bexiga e Barra Funda, short story, 1927
- Laranja da China, short story, 1928
- Mana Maria, novel, 1936
- Cavaquinho e Saxofone, essay, 1940

== Translations ==
- Pathé-Baby, foreword by Oswald de Andrade, illustrations by Paim, French translation, notes and afterword by Antoine Chareyre, Paris, Editions Pétra, coll. "Voix d'ailleurs", 2013, 272p.
