= Negrão =

Negrão is a surname. Notable people with the surname include:

- Alexandre Sarnes Negrão (born 1985), Brazilian entrepreneur and race car driver
- André Negrão (born 1992), Brazilian racing driver
- Fernando Negrão (born 1955), Portuguese jurist and politician
- Júnior Negrão (born 1986), Brazilian footballer
- Marcelo Negrão (born 1972), Brazilian volleyball player
- Mário Negrão (born 1945), Brazilian composer, drummer and percussionist
