= Chico Buarque de Hollanda (album) =

Studio album by Chico Buarque
- Released: 1966
- Genres: MPB, samba
- Length: 27:08
- Label: RGE
- Producer: Manuel Barenbein

Chico Buarque chronology
Chico Buarque de Hollanda (1966)	Chico Buarque de Hollanda (1967)

Chico Buarque de Hollanda is the debut studio album by the Brazilian musician Chico Buarque. It was released in 1966 in a 12-track vinyl format.

Professional ratings
Review scores
Source	Rating
Allmusic	4.5/5 stars

== Track listing ==
All tracks are written by Chico Buarque.

Side one
No.	Title	Length
1.	"A Banda"	2:11
2.	"Tem Mais Samba"	1:45
3.	"A Rita"	2:01
4.	"Ela e Sua Janela"	2:10
5.	"Madalena Foi Pro Mar"	1:41
6.	"Pedro Pedreiro"	2:36

Side two
No.	Title	Length
7.	"Amanhã, Ninguém Sabe"	2:08
8.	"Você Não Ouviu"	2:43
9.	"Juca"	1:50
10.	"Olê, Olá"	3:06
11.	"Meu Refrão"	2:43
12.	"Sonho de um Carnaval"	2:14

== In popular culture ==
The album's cover art became a viral internet meme with "happy" Chico and "sad" Chico. Buarque explained in an interview October 2019 that he wanted a photo that would project the image of a serious composer, while the record company, Rádio Gravações Especializadas, wanted a photo of him smiling, and that the result is what it is. Laughing, Buarque noted that whenever he sees the cover—as a meme or not—he thinks to himself: "How absurd is this."
