= Chico Buarque (2011 album) =

Studio album by Chico Buarque
- Released: 2011
- Genre: MPB

Chico Buarque is an album by Brazilian composer, singer and musician Chico Buarque released on June 20, 2011.

== Track listing ==
1. "Querido Diário"
  - "C. Buarque"
2. "Rubato"
  - "C. Buarque, Helder"
3. "Essa pequena"
  - "C. Buarque"
4. "Tipo um baião"
  - "C. Buarque"
5. "Se eu soubesse (with Thais Gulin)"
  - "C. Buarque"
6. "Sem você nº 2
  - C. Buarque"
7. "Sou eu (with Wilson das Neves)"
  - "C. Buarque, I. Lins"
8. "Nina"
  - "C. Buarque"
9. "Barafunda"
  - "C. Buarque"
10. "Sinhá (with João Bosco)"
  - "C. Buarque, J. Bosco"
