= Sérgio Buarque de Holanda =

Brazilian historian, writer, journalist, and sociologist (1902–1982)

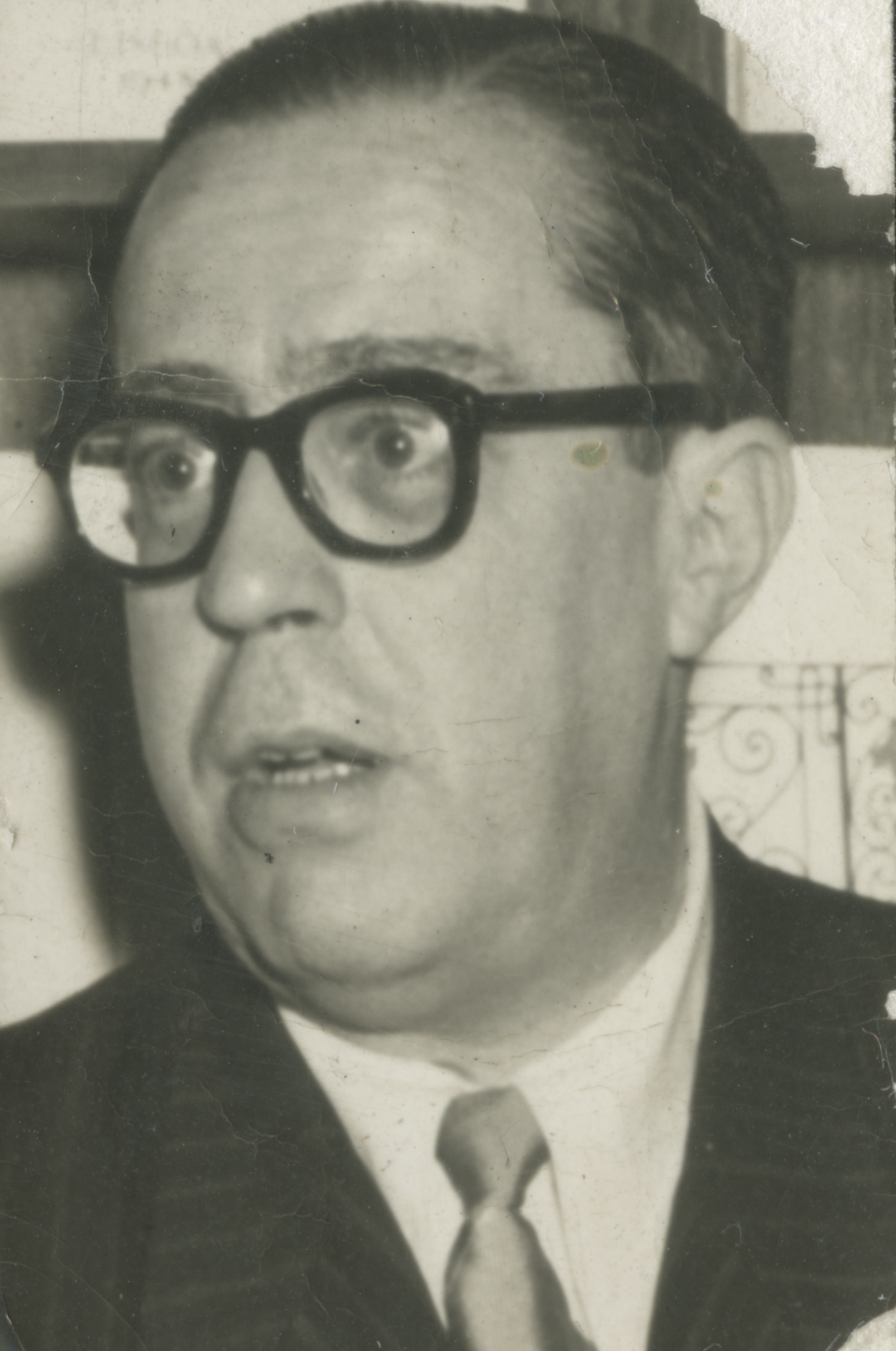
- Born: July 11, 1902; São Paulo, Brazil
- Died: April 24, 1982 (aged 79); São Paulo, Brazil

Education
- Education: Federal University of Rio de Janeiro

Philosophical work
- Era: 20th-century philosophy
- Region: Western philosophy
- Main interests: Sociology
- Notable ideas: Cordial man

Sérgio Buarque de Holanda (July 11, 1902 – April 24, 1982) was a Brazilian historian, writer, literary critic, journalist and sociologist. One of his main works, Raízes do Brasil, is widely regarded as a landmark in Brazilian social sciences. In the book, he develops the concept of the cordial man.

== Life and career ==
Sérgio Buarque de Holanda was born on July 11, 1902, in São Paulo. At the age of nineteen, he moved with his family to Rio de Janeiro. In the following year, he participated in the Week of Modern Art, returning to São Paulo for the event, later being nominated by Mário de Andrade and Oswaldo de Andrade the representative of the Klaxon magazine in Rio de Janeiro.

In 1925, he earned the degree of bachelor of law from the Universidade do Brasil, today renamed as Universidade Federal do Rio de Janeiro. In 1926, he moved to Cachoeiro do Itapemirim, in Espírito Santo, after being invited by the director of the newspaper O Progresso. In the same year, he founded with Prudente de Moraes Neto, the magazine Estética.

He returned to Rio de Janeiro in 1927 and started to work as a columnist of the Jornal do Brasil and as an employee of the United Press Agency. Four years later, he traveled to Europe as a correspondent of the Diários Associados and settled in Berlin, where he attended lectures at the Humboldt University of Berlin, especially those by Friedrich Meinecke.

He collaborated, in 1930, in the "Brasilianische Rundschau" magazine of the Conselho do Comércio Brasileiro de Hamburgo. In 1936, back in Brazil, he worked at the Universidade do Distrito Federal as assistant-teacher to Henri Hauser in the chair of contemporary and modern history. He also taught comparative literature as an assistant to Professor Trouchon.

In 1936, Buarque de Holanda published his book Raízes do Brasil, considered by many to be one of the most important books ever written in Brazil.

In 1939, when the Universidade do Distrito Federal was closed, Sergio Buarque de Holanda was invited by Augusto Meyer to be the director of the publishing sector of the Instituto Nacional do Livro. Invited by the State Department sector of International Relations, he traveled in 1941 to the United States.

Three years later, he became the director of the Divisão de Consulta da Biblioteca Nacional do Rio de Janeiro. In 1945, he participated of the Democratic Left foundation, and traveled to São Paulo to participate in the Writers' Congress. He was elected as a president of the Federal District Sector of the Brazilian Association of Writers.

In 1946, he moved to São Paulo, where he substituted for his ex-professor, Afonso Taunay, as director of the Museu Paulista and, in 1947, he became professor of Economic history of Brazil in the Escola de Sociologia e Política, substituting for Roberto Simonsen.

He traveled to Paris for three academic conferences at the Sorbonne, in 1949 and, in 1952, Buarque de Holanda moved with his family to Italy, where he stayed for two years as visiting professor in the Brazilian Studies Department of University of Rome.

In 1957, he received the Edgard Cavalheiro Prize from the Instituto Nacional do Livro after publishing the book "Caminhos e Fronteiras". He occupied in 1958, the chair of History of the Brazilian Civilization in the Faculdade de Filosofia, Letras e Ciências Humanas of University of São Paulo (USP), with the thesis Visão do Paraíso – os motivos edênicos no descobrimento e na colonização do Brasil.

He became in 1962 the first director of the Instituto de Estudos Brasileiros of University of São Paulo. From 1963 to 1967, he traveled as visiting professor to universities in Chile and the United States and participated in cultural missions in association with Unesco in Peru and Costa Rica.

In 1969, he retired from his job as professor of USP in solidarity with his colleagues affected by the AI-5 (see Brazilian military dictatorship and military dictatorship). He also received the Governador do Estado Prize, in 1967, in the category of literature.

In 1979, he received, as the year's Brazilian Intellectual, the Juca Pato Prize. In the following year, Buarque de Holanda participated in the foundation of the Workers' Party receiving the third membership card of the party.

Sérgio Buarque de Holanda died in São Paulo, on April 24, 1982, from pulmonary complications.

== Partial bibliography ==
(By year of first ed.)

- Raízes do Brasil. Rio de Janeiro, 1936.
- Cobra de Vidro. São Paulo, 1944.
- Monções. Rio de Janeiro, 1945.
- Expansão Paulista em Fins do Século XVI e Princípio do Século XVII. São Paulo, 1948.
- Caminhos e Fronteiras. Rio de Janeiro, 1957.
- Visão do Paraíso. Os motivos edênicos no descobrimento e colonização do Brasil. São Paulo, 1959.
- Do Império à República. São Paulo, 1972. (História Geral da Civilização Brasileira, Tomo II, vol. 5).
- Tentativas de Mitologia. São Paulo, 1979.
- Sergio Buarque de Hollanda: História (org. Maria Odila Dias). São Paulo, 1985.
- O Extremo Oeste . São Paulo, 1986.
- O espírito e a letra (org. Antonio Arnoni do Prado) 2 vols. São Paulo, 1996.
- Para uma nova história (org. Marcos Costa). São Paulo, 2004 (collection of texts).

== Family ==
In 1936 Sérgio Buarque de Hollanda married the painter and pianist Maria Amélia Cesário Alvim (1910—2010), known as Memélia. They had seven children, among them Heloísa, known as Miúcha (1937—2018), Chico Buarque (born 1944), Ana de Hollanda (born 1948 and Cristina Buarque (1950—2015).

== See also ==
- Jeitinho
