= Cordial man =

Sociological concept

The cordial man (Portuguese: Homem cordial) is a sociological concept developed by Brazilian historian and sociologist Sérgio Buarque de Holanda in his book Raízes do Brasil, first published in 1936.

== Definition ==
According to Holanda, cordiality is the unique Brazilian tendency to establish intimacy and reject acts of conventionalism and social formality. In practice, cordiality models social relations under the model of a family, with the consequence of considering society's private and public spheres as parts of a single level.

The concept was further explored in the book's third edition, released twenty years after the first, with Holanda stating that cordiality incentivized Brazilians to see the State as a second home, filled with family members and friends, creating a patrimonial society.
