= A Banda =

"A Banda" (transl. The Band) is a composition by Chico Buarque that was first performed live in 1966 by Buarque and Nara Leão, during the II Música Popular Brasileira (MPB) Festival in TV Record's theater, São Paulo, winning the "Viola de Ouro" award for best composition. "A Banda" brought Buarque immediately into the limelight in Brazil. The song was also released in 1966, on the Brazilian RGE label, as the first track of side 1 in Chico Buarque de Hollanda (Vol. 1) LP.

== Mina version ==
"La banda"

Single by Mina

from the album Sabato sera – Studio Uno '67
- B-side: "Se c'è una cosa che mi fa impazzire"
- Released: May 1967
- Genre: Música Popular Brasileira
- Length: 2:35
- Label: Ri-Fi
- Composer: Chico Buarque
- Lyricist: Antonio Amurri

Mina singles chronology
"Conversazione" (1967)	"La banda" (1967)	"Tu non mi lascerai" (1967)

In 1967, singer Mina released an Italian version of the song called "La banda". The song was a success in Italy, where it became number two on the chart, and sales exceeded 400 thousand copies. The Italian lyrics were written by Antonio Amurri.

In 1970, Mina also recorded an original Portuguese version for the album Mina canta o Brasil.

Buarque, who was living in Italy at the time, later performed this version.

=== Charts ===
Chart performance for "La banda"
Chart (1967)	Peak position
Italia (Musica e dischi)	2

== Herb Alpert version ==
"A Banda (Ah Bahn-da)"

Single by Herb Alpert & the Tijuana Brass

from the album Herb Alpert's Ninth
- B-side: "Miss Frenchy Brown"
- Released: 1967
- Genre: Easy listening
- Length: 2:09
- Label: A&M
- Songwriter: Chico Buarque

Herb Alpert & the Tijuana Brass singles chronology
"The Happening" (1967)	"A Banda (Ah Bahn-da)" (1967)	"Carmen" (1968)

As an instrumental, the song was performed by Herb Alpert & the Tijuana Brass, who had their third and final number one on the Easy Listening chart in October 1967. It peaked at number 35 on the Billboard Hot 100.

The instrumental version by Herb Alpert & the Tijuana Brass was used in the Soviet cartoon Well, Just You Wait! in the 8th episode (at 06:27-07:30).

=== Charts ===
Chart performance for "A Banda" by Herb Alpert
Chart (1967–1968)	Peak position
Australia (Kent Music Report)	33
US Adult Contemporary (Billboard)	1
US Billboard Hot 100	35
West Germany (GfK)	22

== Other cover versions ==
- In 1967, Astrud Gilberto brought the song to the US, recording it with English lyrics on the Verve/Copacabana label, crediting Bob Russell for the English lyrics.
- The French singer France Gall popularized this song, titled "Zwei Apfelsinen im Haar" in German ("Two oranges in the hair" in English).
- A Czech version named "La banda" was performed by Vladěna Krumlová in 1969.
- Also in 1999 the German band Captain Jack used a riff from "A Banda" in the song "Get Up".

== See also ==
- List of Billboard Easy Listening number ones of 1967
