= Hollanda (disambiguation) =

Hollanda is a genus of prehistoric birds from the late Cretaceous period.

Hollanda may also refer to:

- Baan Hollanda, former Dutch trading village in Thailand
- Cyclone Hollanda, 1994
- de Hollanda, surname
- Pedro Hollanda Carvalho, Brazilian ichthyologist, taxon authority
