= Cristina Buarque =

Brazilian singer and composer (1950–2025)

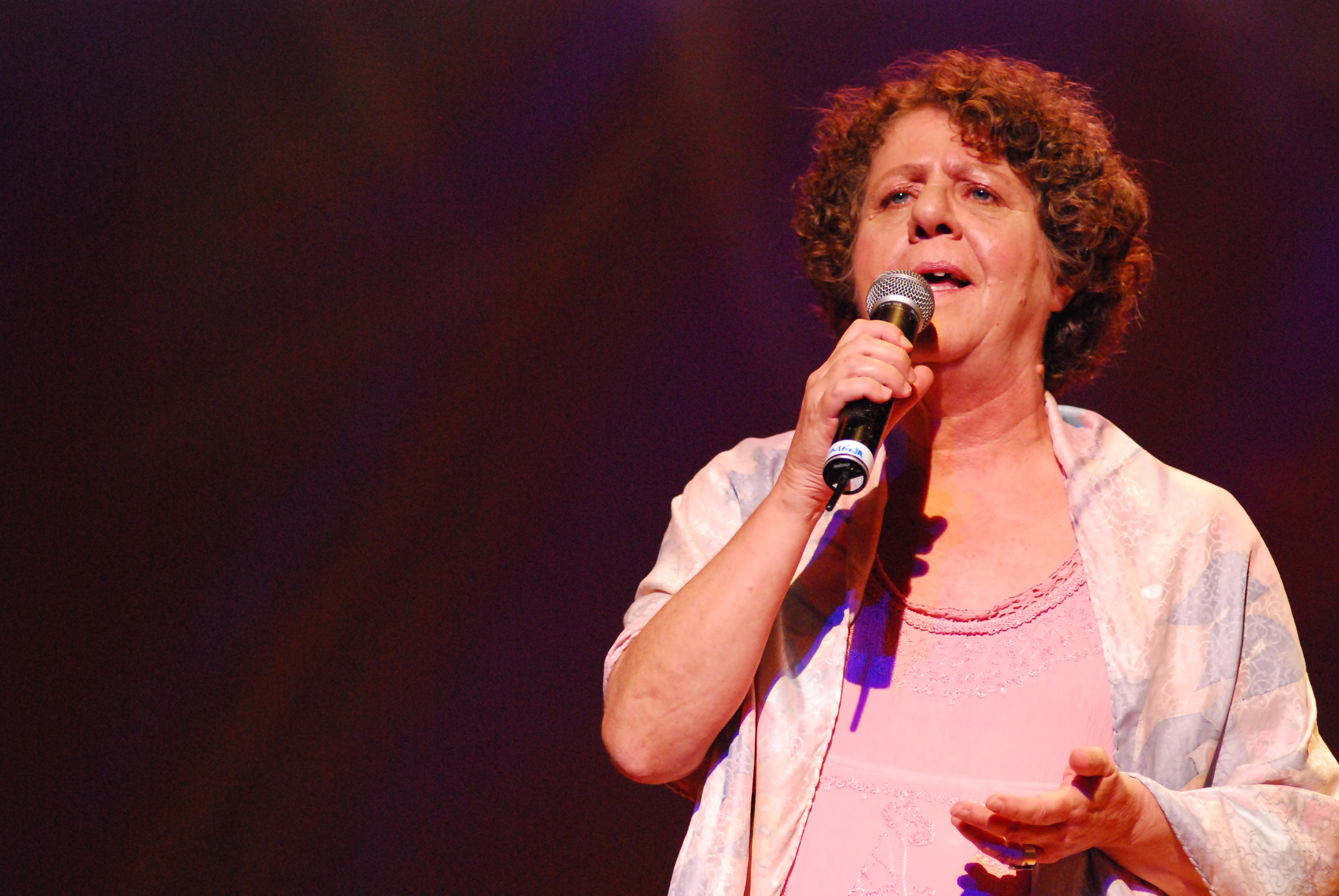
- Buarque performing in 2008

Background information
- Born: Maria Christina Buarque de Holanda; December 23, 1950; São Paulo, São Paulo, Brazil
- Died: April 20, 2025 (aged 74) Rio de Janeiro, Rio de Janeiro, Brazil
- Genres: Samba, MPB
- Occupations: Singer, songwriter
- Instrument: Vocals

Maria Christina Buarque de Holanda (December 23, 1950 – April 20, 2025) was a Brazilian singer and composer. She was the daughter of historian Sérgio Buarque de Holanda and sister of Chico Buarque, Miúcha and Ana de Hollanda.

Buarque died of complications arising from the cancer for which she was being treated at her residence on Paquetá Island, on April 20, 2025. She was 74. President Luiz Inácio Lula da Silva mourned the loss of Cristina, whom he called: “a talented singer and songwriter, who played an extraordinary role in Brazilian music by interpreting the songs of some of the most important composers of Rio's samba, helping the poetry and rhythm of Rio's hills to conquer the hearts of Brazilians.”

== Discography ==
- Paulo Vanzolini - onze sambas e uma capoeira (1967) Marcus Pereira Records LP
- Chico Buarque de Holanda volume 3 (1968) RGE LP
- Cristina (1974) RC LP
- Paulo Vanzolini - onze sambas e uma capoeira (1975) Marcus Pereira LP
- Prato e faca (1976) RCA LP
- Tiro de misericórdia (1977) RCA LP
- Pelas ruas (1977) Odeon LP
- Arrebém (1978) Continental LP
- Clementina e convidados (1979) EMI-Odeon LP
- Ópera do malandro (1979) Philips LP
- Vejo amanhecer (1980)Ariola LP
- Cristina (1981) Ariola LP
- Geraldo Pereira - evocação V (1981) Estúdio Eldorado LP
- Cadáver Pega Fogo Durante o Velório (1983)
- Nelson Cavaquinho - As flores em vida (1985) Estúdio Eldorado LP
- Cristina e Mauro Duarte (1985) Coomusa LP
- Resgate/Deixa eu viver na orgia (1987) Independente Compacto duplo
- Candeia (1988) Funarte LP
- Homenagem a Paulo da Portela (1989) Idéia Livre LP
- Bloco Carnavalesco Simpatia é Quase Amor - 5 anos de samba em Ipanema (1990) Fama LP
- Resgate (1994) Saci CD
- Estácio & Flamengo - 100 anos de samba e amor (1995) Saci CD
- Sem tostão… a crise é boato. Canções de Noel Rosa (1995) Millan CD
- Eterna chama/Candeia. Homenagem (1998) Perfil Musical CD
- Chico Buarque de Mangueira (1998) BMG CD
- Ganha-se pouco, mas é divertido (2000) Jam Music CD
- Ala de Compositores da Portela (2000) CD
- Sem tostão 2… a crise continua (2001) Rob Digital CD
- Acertos de contas de Paulo Vanzolini (2002) Biscoito Fino CD
- Um ser de luz - saudação a Clara Nunes (2003) Deckdisc CD
- Cristina Buarque e Terreiro Grande Ao Vivo (2007) Independente/Tratore CD
