= Miúcha =

Brazilian musician (1937–2018)

Miúcha Heloisa Maria Buarque de Hollanda
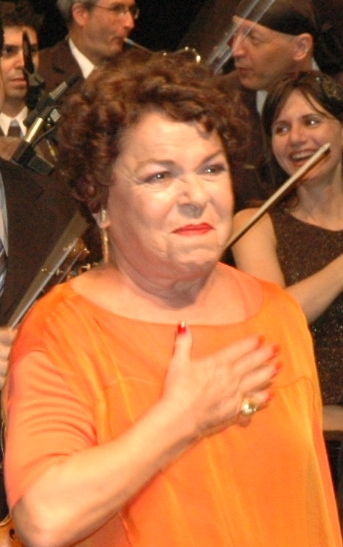
- Miúcha in São Paulo city, 2011.

Background information
- Born: 30 November 1937; Rio de Janeiro, Brazil
- Died: 27 December 2018 (aged 81) Rio de Janeiro, Brazil
- Genres: bossa nova, samba, MPB
- Instrument: Vocals
- Years active: 1975-2018
- Spouse: João Gilberto (married 1965-1971)

Heloísa Maria Buarque de Hollanda (30 November 1937 – 27 December 2018), known professionally as Miúcha, was a Brazilian singer and composer.

She belonged to a musical family. Her siblings included singer and composer Chico Buarque and two sisters, the singers Ana de Hollanda and Cristina Buarque. She was the second wife and creative partner of João Gilberto, and mother of singer Bebel Gilberto.

== Life and career ==
Heloísa Maria Buarque de Hollanda was born in Rio de Janeiro. When she was 8 years old her family moved to São Paulo. As a child she formed a vocal ensemble with her siblings.

In 1960 she moved to Paris where she studied Art History at the École du Louvre.

In 1975, she recorded professionally for the first time singing on the album The Best of Two Worlds in partnership with João Gilberto and Stan Getz. After this release, Miúcha partnered with Tom Jobim on two albums, in 1977 and 1979, and was part of the show organized by Aloysio de Oliveira along with Vinicius de Moraes, Tom Jobim and Toquinho. The act was shown for a year at Canecão in Rio de Janeiro, followed by international shows in South America and Europe, and gave origin to the recording Tom, Vinícius, Toquinho e Miúcha recorded live in Canecão (RCA Victor, 1977).

== Personal life and death ==
In 1963, Miúcha went on holiday with friends to Greece, Italy and France. In Paris, in the bar La Candelaria, she met the Chilean singer Violeta Parra, who introduced her to singer and future husband João Gilberto. Miúcha and Gilberto married in 1965 and had a daughter, Bebel Gilberto, in 1966.

Miúcha died at the age of 81 due to respiratory failure on 27 December 2018, at the Hospital Samaritano in Rio de Janeiro, where she was being treated for lung cancer. She was interred at the Saint John the Baptist's Cemetery in Rio de Janeiro.

== Discography ==
- The Best of Two Worlds (1976) Columbia LP
- Miúcha & Antônio Carlos Jobim (1977) RCA Victor LP
- Tom/Vinicius/Toquinho/Miúcha - Gravado ao vivo no Canecão (1977) Som Livre LP, CD
- Os Saltimbancos (1977) Phonogram/Philips Records LP, CD
- Miúcha & Tom Jobim (1979) RCA Victor LP
- Miúcha (1980) RCA Victor LP
- Miúcha (1989) Warner/Continental LP
- Vivendo Vinicius ao vivo Baden Powell, Carlos Lyra, Miúcha e Toquinho (1999) BMG Brasil CD
- Rosa amarela (1999) BMG Brasil CD
- Miúcha.compositores (2002) Biscoito Fino CD
- Miúcha canta Vinicius & Vinicius - Música e letra (2003) Biscoito Fino CD
- Miúcha Outros Sonhos (2007) Biscoito Fino CD
- Miucha com Vinicius/Tom/João (2008) Sony & BMG CD
