= Ana de Hollanda =

Brazilian politician (born 1948)

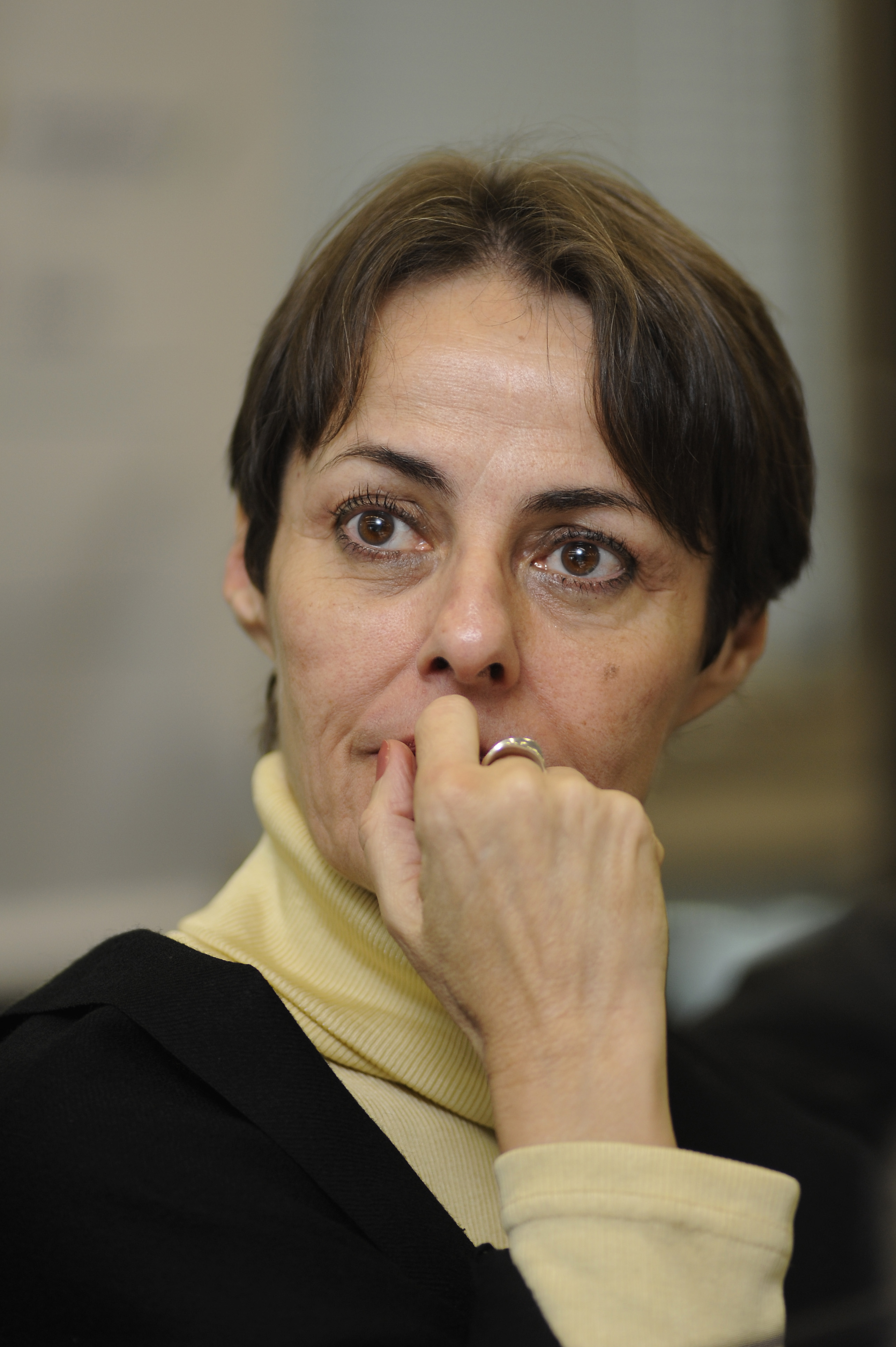

Minister of Culture
- In office 1 January 2011 – 13 September 2012
- President: Dilma Rousseff
- Preceded by: Juca Ferreira
- Succeeded by: Marta Suplicy

Personal details
- Born: Anna Maria Alvim Buarque de Hollanda; 12 August 1948 (age 77) São Paulo, Brazil
- Parents: Sérgio Buarque de Holanda (father); Maria Amélia Alvim (mother)
- Relatives: Chico Buarque (brother); Miúcha (sister)
- Profession: Singer, songwriter, producer, theater director, screenwriter, actress, playwright

Anna Maria Alvim Buarque de Hollanda (born 12 August 1948) was the Minister of Culture of Brazil from 2011 to 2012.

She worked as a singer before, and is the sister of Chico Buarque, Cristina Buarque, and Miúcha, and daughter of sociologist Sérgio Buarque de Holanda.

Political offices
| Preceded by Juca Ferreira | Minister of Culture; 2011–12 | Succeeded by Marta Suplicy |
