= Mário Negrão =

Mário Negrão Borgonovi
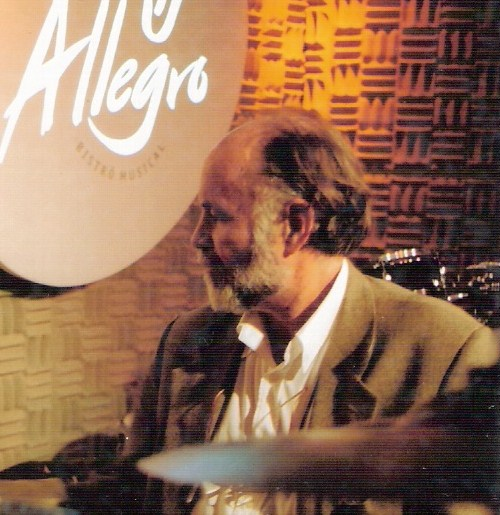

Background information
- Birth name: Mário Negrão Borgonovi
- Born: November 18, 1945
- Origin: Campinas, São Paulo, Brazil
- Genres: Jazz, big band, Brazilian music
- Occupation(s): Songwriter, drummer, percussionist
- Instrument(s): Drums, percussion

Mário Negrão Borgonovi (born November 18, 1945, in Campinas, São Paulo) is a Brazilian composer, drummer and percussionist.

== Early life and study ==
Negrão began studying the accordion at the age of five with teacher Lucia Gomes Pinto, Carlos Gomes's grandniece. He came to the state of Rio de Janeiro in 1964 to study agricultural engineering and forestry, and graduated in 1968. At this time, he began studying drums. In the second year of college, he met friends in Rio and connected to jazz, a genre that became very important for his musical training.

Upon graduating, he opted to pursue a musical career rather than engineering. By this time, he already devoted entirely to the study of music and was a student of conductor Guerra Peixe, at the Museu da Imagem e do Som, and later in Pro-Art.

He began his early work as a professional musician in the nightclubs of Rio de Janeiro. At this time, he was approved in a contest promoted by the Brazilian Symphony Orchestra in 1972 where he apprenticed for two years.

== Musical career ==
In his career, Mario Negrão accompanied Baden Powell, Carlos Lyra, Claudete Soares, Clara Nunes, Chico Buarque, Egberto Gismonti, Leila Pinheiro, MPB4, Paulinho Nogueira, Quarteto em Cy, Rosinha de Valença, Sergio Ricardo, Tom Jobim, Toquinho, Vinícius de Moraes, among others.

He has played alongside several musicians, among them Alberto Chimelli, Antonio Adolfo, Arthur Verocai, Bebeto Von Buetner, Bebeto Castilho, Cristovão Bastos, Edson Lobo, Edson Frederico, Jota Moraes, Kimson Plaut, Luiz Roberto (Cariocas), Luiz Claudio Ramos, Luiz Eça, Luiz Carlos Vinhas, Luiz Alves, Mauro Senise, Marvio Ciribelli, Nilson Matta, Brazilian Symphony Orchestra, Orival Boreli, Paulo Moura, Paulo Pugliesi, Rafael Rabello, Rio Jazz Orchestra, Ricardo do Canto, Renato Ramalho Jr., Sydney Moreira, Sergio Barrozo, and Tião Neto.

He recorded a solo album with songs of his own and was awarded the prize of Icatu Hartford Gear in 1980.

He worked with composition in partnership with MPB4's Miltinho, Alberto Chimelli, Cristóvão Bastos, MPB4 and Paulinho Pinheiro.

In August 2000, he won the 1st prize at the Festival of Friburgo with the song "Samba Antigo" in partnership with Miltinho (MPB4) and Paulinho Pinheiro.

In September 2001, he was one of 12 finalists among 264 musicians that competed for the prize Museu da Imagem e do Som, with the composition "Choro Respira Fundo", which he had written in partnership with Cristóvão Bastos.

== New graduation ==
He graduated in 2007 from the Brazilian Conservatory of Music-University Centre, majoring in Percussion. He was an orchestra percussionist at Universidade Católica de Petrópolis between 2002 and 2003, as well as professor of percussion and drums at the Brazilian Conservatory of Music – University Centre in Rio de Janeiro from 2008 to 2012. He was a special graduate student in the UNIRIO master class under Prof. Dra. Laura Rónai. (2009) and Prof. Dr. Silvio Merhy, MD, PhD.

He gained a master's degree by UNIRIO in July 2014, with the thesis, "O Prato Ride no Samba Carioca".

== Discography ==
=== Albums ===
- Phono 73 (1973 CBD Phonogram)
- Mané do Cavaco (1973 RCA Victor)
- Botequim Toquinho & Guarnieri (1973 RGE Discos)
- Canto do Homens MPB4 (1976 Philips)
- Antologia Vol. 2 MPB4 (1977 Philips)
- Chico Buarque (1978 Philips)
- Cobra de Vidro MPB4/Quarteto EM CY (1978 Philips)
- Coração Marginal Eduardo Gudin (1978 Discos Continental)
- Encontro Marcado MPB4/Milton Nascimento (1978 Polygram 518332-2)
- MPB4 em Bons Tempos Hein (1979 Philips)
- Cenas Riberti (1979 Gravações Chantecler LTDA)
- Nas Asas do Moinho Paulinho Nogueira (1979 Arlequim)
- Madeira em Pé Mario Negrão (1980 COOMUSA)
- MPBC Luis Claudio Ramos (1980 Philips)
- Francisco Mario Revolta dos Palhaços (1981 F. Mario Produções Artísticas E Comercio Disco)
- Bimba (1981 Disco Indepente)

== Bibliography ==
- Dicionário Cravo Albin da Música Popular Brasileira
- Chico Buarque (1978 Philips)
- Universidade Federal Rural do Rio de Janeiro UFRRJ
- Orquestra Sinfônica Brasileira
- registro em CD do Museu da Imagem e do Som — Rio de Janeiro
- diploma registrado sob o numero 0499, livro 02, folhas 85v, 10 de junho de 2008 Conselho Federal de Educação
- Universidade Católica de Petrópolis
- Conservatório Brasileiro de Música – Centro Universitário, Rio de Janeiro, RJ
- Universidade Federal do Estado do Rio de Janeiro UNIRIO
- Cooperativa dos Músicos Profissionais do Estado do Rio de Janeiro
