= Prudente de Morais Neto =

Brazilian journalist and lawyer

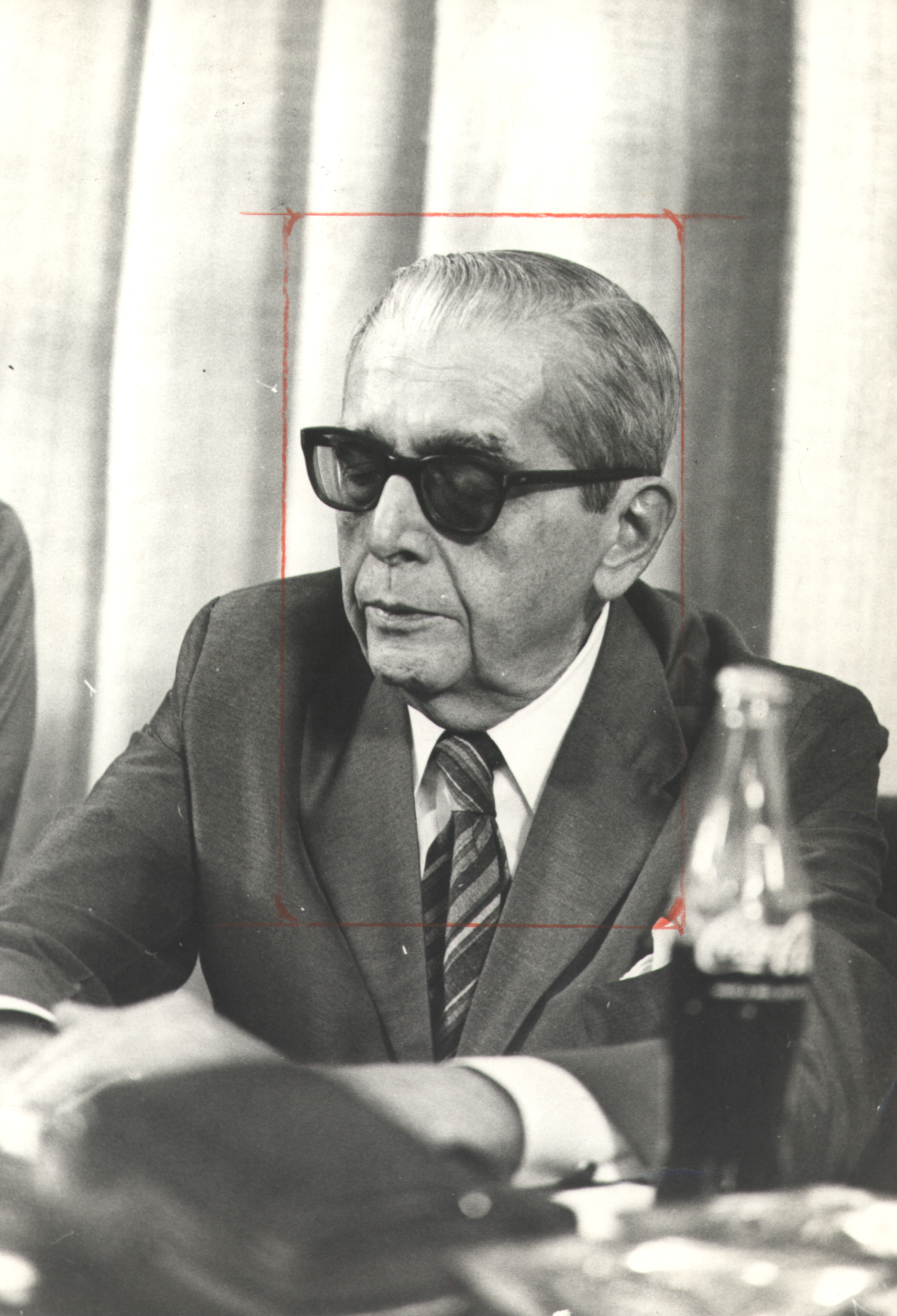
A picture of Prudente de Moraes Neto

Prudente de Morais Neto or Prudente de Moraes Neto (1904–1977), writing under the pseudonym Pedro Dantas was a Brazilian lawyer and journalist.

He was editor of the Diário Carioca. He was severely critical of left-leaning president João Goulart who was deposed by the 1964 Brazilian military coup, though after the coup protected leftist journalists among his friends.
