= MPB4 =

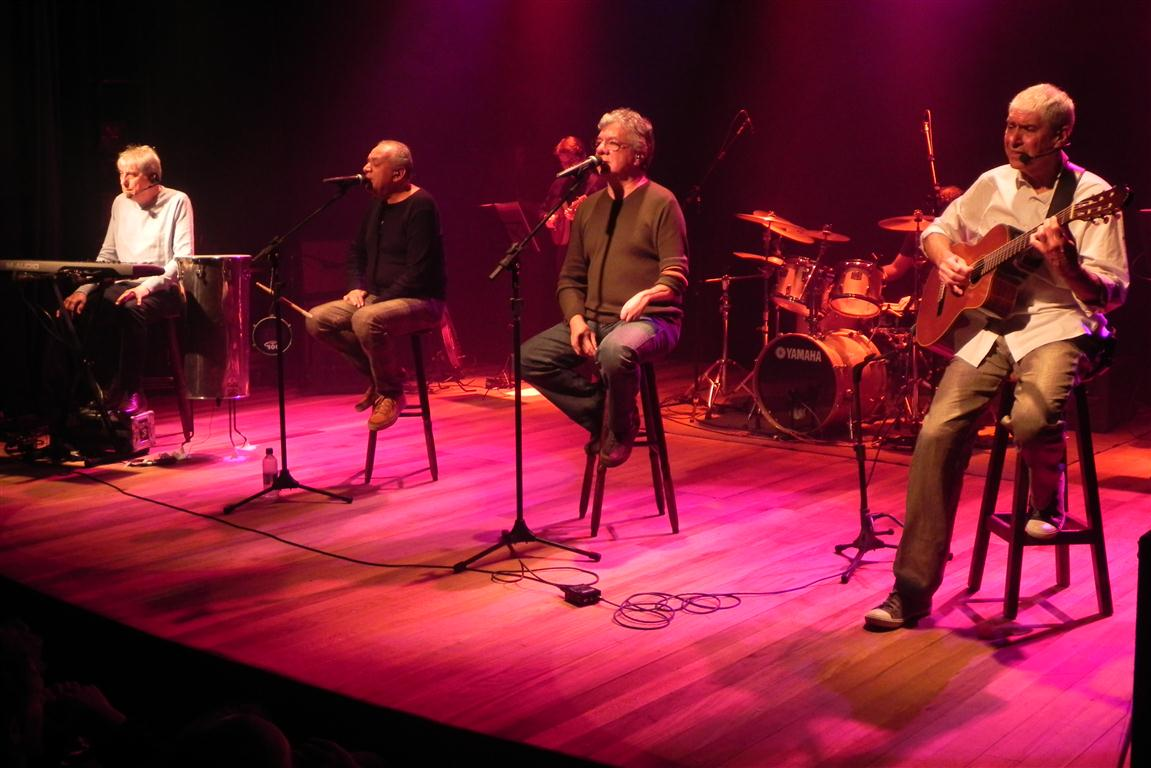
- MPB4 in Curitiba 2011

Background information
- Origin: Niterói, Rio de Janeiro
- Genres: Samba; MPB; Latin pop; Latin music; Latin jazz; Jazz
- Years active: 1965–present
- Labels: Elenco Records; Philips Records; Ariola Records; Barclay Records; Mercury Records; PolyGram; Universal Music Group; Continental Records; EMI; Abril Music; Eldorado; Biscoito Fino; Som Livre
- Members: Aquiles; Miltinho; Dalmo Medeiros; Paulo Malaguti
- Past members: Magro; Ruy Faria

MPB4 (Short for Música popular brasileira 4) is a vocal and instrumental Brazilian group formed in Niterói, Rio de Janeiro, in 1965, and has been active since. The group's main genres are sung samba and MPB, and they are considered among the best vocal interpretation group in Brazil. They have frequently collaborated with Quarteto em Cy, Toquinho and Chico Buarque. In 2001, MPB-4 completed a 36-year career with the same formation (registered in the Brazilian edition of the Guinness Book of Records).

== Founding ==
The group was founded when the members met through the Centro Popular de Cultura (Popular Culture Center, or CPC), affiliated with the União Nacional dos Estudante (National Students Union, or UNE). The initial lineup featured Miltinho (Milton Lima dos Santos Filho, Campos dos Goytacazes, October 18, 1943), Magro (Antônio José Waghabi Filho, Itaocara, RJ, November 14, 1943 – August 8, 2012), Achilles (Achille Rique Reis, Niterói, RJ, May 22, 1948) and Ruy Faria (Ruy Alexandre Faria, Cambuci, RJ, July 31, 1937 – Rio de Janeiro, RJ, January 11, 2018). The quartet was originally known as Quarteto do CPC. With the extinction of the CPC (and of the UNE) after the 1964 Brazilian coup d'état, the group adopted the name of MPB-4,

== 1960s and 1970s ==
In 1965, the band moved to São Paulo. In the city they came into contact with recently launched artists who would later achieve fame: Chico Buarque, Nara Leão, Sidney Miller, Quarteto em Cy. Their themes often included references to Brazilian culture and customs ad well as criticism of the country's political situation immersed in the military dictatorship. During this period the group also participated in many National Brazilian music festivals. The group recorded their first self-titled LP in 1966. Throughout the late 1960s they also participated in several Brazilian song festivals.

Their collaborations with Chico Buarque was one of their longest lasting. They recorded "Roda Viva" together in 1967, and traveled with him on his tours in Brazil and abroad. Their partnership lasted through the mid-1970s.

MPB4 was also known for their voiceover work in Disney animated films. They provided the singing voices of the vultures in The Jungle Book, and three of the band members did the singing voices of some crows in the second dub of Dumbo.

== 1980s and Beyond ==
In 1980, the group released, together with Quarteto em Cy, the children's LP "Flicts." MPB4 recorded another children's LP in the next year, "O Pato."

In 1991, the quartet recorded Sambas da Minha Terra, dedicated to the works of Dorival Caymmi, Toquinho/Vinícius, Zé Kéti, and Ary Barroso, among others. The group commemorated their 30-year career in 1995 with the show, "Arte de Cantar" and an album of the same name.

== Discography ==
- "Samba bem" (1964) Sarau Compacto duplo
- "Samba lamento/São Salvador" (1965) Elenco Compacto simples
- "MPB-4" (1966) Elenco LP
- "MPB-4" (1967) Elenco LP
- "MPB-4" (1968) Elenco LP
- "Deixa estar" (1970) Elenco/Philips LP
- "De palavra em palavra" (1971) Elenco/Phonogram LP
- "Cicatrizes" (1972) Phonogram LP/CD
- "Antologia do samba" (1974) Phonogram LP/CD
- "Palhaços & Reis" (1974) Phonogram LP
- "10 anos depois" (1975) Phonogram LP
- "Canto dos homens" (1976) Phonogram LP
- "Antologia do samba nº 2" (1977) Phonogram LP
- "Cobra de vidro" (1978) Phonogram LP
- "Bons tempos, hein?!" (1979) PolyGram LP
- "Vira virou" (1980) Ariola LP
- "Flicts-Ziraldo e Sérgio Ricardo" (1980) LP
- "Adivinha o que é?" (1981) Ariola LP/CD
- "Tempo tempo" (1981) Ariola LP
- "Caminhos livres" (1983) Ariola LP
- "4 Coringas" (1984) Barclay LP
- "Feitiço carioca-do MPB-4 para Noel Rosa" (1987) Continental LP/CD
- "Ao vivo-do show Amigo é pra essas coisas" (1989) Som Livre LP/CD
- "Sambas da minha terra" (1991) Som Livre CD
- "Encontro marcado-MPB-4 canta Milton Nascimento" (1993) PolyGram CD
- "Arte de cantar-MPB-4 ao vivo" (1995) Som Livre CD
- "Bate-boca-Quarteto em Cy e MPB-4" (1997) PolyGram CD
- "Somos todos iguais-Quarteto em Cy e MPB-4" (1998) PolyGram CD
- "Melhores momentos - Ao Vivo" (1999) CID CD
- "Vinícius-A arte do encontro. MPB-4 e Quarteto em Cy" (2000) Som Livre CD
- "MPB-4 e a nova música brasileira" (2000) Abril Music CD
- "MPB-4 40 anos ao vivo" (2007) Emi Music CD
- "MPB-4 40 anos ao vivo" (2007) Emi Music DVD
- "Toquinho e MPB-4 - 40 anos de música" (2008) Biscoito Fino CD
- "Toquinho e MPB-4 - 40 anos de música" (2009) Biscoito Fino DVD
- "Contigo Aprendi" (2012) Biscoito Fino CD
