= Chico Buarque =

Brazilian singer-songwriter (born 1944)

Chico Buarque OMC ComIH
- Buarque in 2023
- Born: Francisco Buarque de Hollanda; 19 June 1944 (age 82); Rio de Janeiro, Brazil
- Education: University of São Paulo
- Occupations: Singer-songwriter; writer; poet; playwright
- Years active: 1962–present
- Notable work: Construção; "Cálice"
- Spouses: Marieta Severo (m. 1966; div. 1999) Carol Proner (m. 2021)
- Children: 3
- Father: Sérgio Buarque de Holanda
- Relatives: Miúcha (sister); Cristina Buarque (sister); Ana de Hollanda (sister)
- Musical career
- Genres: MPB; samba; bossa nova; choro
- Labels: Polygram; Ariola Records; RCA Victor; Universal Music; Mercury Records; Som Livre
- Website: chicobuarque.com.br

Francisco Buarque de Hollanda (born 19 June 1944), popularly known as Chico Buarque (Brazilian Portuguese pronunciation: [ˈʃiku buˈaʁki]), is a Brazilian singer-songwriter, guitarist, composer, playwright, writer, and poet. He is best known for his music, which often includes social, economic, and cultural reflections on Brazil.

The firstborn son of Sérgio Buarque de Hollanda, Buarque lived at several locations throughout his childhood, though mostly in Rio de Janeiro, São Paulo, and Rome. He wrote and studied literature as a child and found music through the bossa nova compositions of Tom Jobim and João Gilberto. He performed as a singer and guitarist in the 1960s as well as writing a play that was deemed dangerous by the Brazilian military dictatorship of the time. Buarque, along with several Tropicalist and MPB musicians, was threatened by the Brazilian military government and eventually left Brazil for Italy in 1969. However, he came back to Brazil in 1970 and continued to record, perform, and write, though much of his material was suppressed by government censors. He released several more albums in the 1980s and published three novels in the 1990s and 2000s.

In 2019, Buarque was awarded the Camões Prize, the most important prize for literature in the Portuguese language. However, the awarding of the prize was delayed by four years due to actions by Jair Bolsonaro, but Buarque received it in April 2023. He has also won eleven Brazilian Music Awards, the most important prize for Brazilian music.

== Early life and career ==
Buarque was born in Rio de Janeiro, Brazil, on 19 June 1944. He came from an intellectually privileged family background—his father Sérgio Buarque de Holanda was a well-known historian, sociologist and journalist, and his mother Maria Amélia Cesário Alvim was a painter and pianist. He is also the brother of the singers Miúcha, Cristina Buarque, and politician Ana de Hollanda. As a child, he was impressed by the musical style of bossa nova, specifically the work of Tom Jobim and João Gilberto. He was also interested in writing, composing his first short story at 18 years old and studying European literature, also at a young age. One of his most consuming interests, however, was playing football, beginning at the age of four, and he still played regularly in his 60s. During his childhood, he lived in Rio de Janeiro, São Paulo and Rome.

Before becoming a musician, Buarque decided at one point to study architecture at the University of São Paulo, but this choice did not lead to a career in that field; Buarque often skipped classes.

Buarque on TV Rio, 1967. National Archives of Brazil

He made his public debut as a musician and composer in 1964, rapidly building his reputation at music festivals and television variety shows when bossa nova came to light and Nara Leão recorded three of his songs. His eponymous debut album exemplified his future work, with catchy sambas characterised by inventive wordplay and an undercurrent of nostalgic tragedy. Buarque had his first hit with "A Banda" in 1966, written about a marching band, and soon released several more singles. Although playing bossa nova, during his career, samba and Música popular brasileira would also be widely explored. Despite that, Buarque was criticized by two of the leading musicians at the time, Caetano Veloso and Gilberto Gil as they believed his musical style was overly conservative. However, an existentially themed play that Buarque wrote and composed in 1968, Roda Viva ("Live Circle"), was frowned upon by the military government and Buarque served a short prison sentence because of it. He left Brazil for Italy for 18 months in 1970, returning to write his first novel in 1972, which was not targeted by censors.

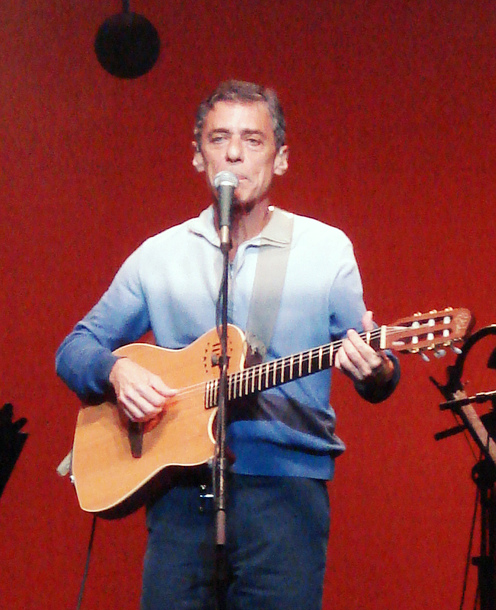
Buarque performing in 2007

At this time, his thinly veiled protest single "Apesar de Você" ("In spite of You" – in reference to the military dictatorship) was also produced. "Apesar de Você" was overlooked by the military censors, becoming an important anthem in the democratic movement. After selling more than 100,000 copies, the single was eventually censored and removed from the market. At one point in 1974, the censors banned any song authored by Chico Buarque. Then, he created a pseudonym, naming himself "Julinho de Adelaide", complete with a life history and interviews with newspapers. "Julinho de Adelaide" authored songs such as "Jorge Maravilha" ("Wonder Jorge") and "Acorda Amor" ("Wake Up Love" as in a lover) before he was outed in a Jornal do Brasil news story. Buarque also wrote a play named Calabar, about the Dutch invasion of Brazil in the seventeenth century, drawing parallels with the military regime. Despite the censorship, songs such as "Samba de Orly" (1970), "Acorda amor" (1974, as "Julinho da Adelaide") manifested Buarque's continuing opposition to the military regime.

During the 1970s and 1980s, he collaborated with filmmakers, playwrights, and musicians in further protest works against the dictatorship. Buarque approached the 1983 Concert for Peace in Nicaragua as a valid forum to vocalise his strong political views. Throughout the decade, he crafted many of his songs as vehicles to describe the re-democratisation of Brazil. The Concert for Peace in Nicaragua was one in a concert series known as the "Central American Peace Concerts." These concerts featured various Latin American artists. The political turmoil that plagued this era was expressed in many of Buarque's songs. He later wrote Budapeste, a novel that achieved critical national acclaim and won the Prêmio Jabuti, a Brazilian literary award comparable to the Booker Prize.

His 2017 album Caravanas was named the third best Brazilian album of that year by the Brazilian edition of Rolling Stone.

== Awards and recognitions ==
- 2010: São Paulo Prize for Literature — Shortlisted in the Best Book of the Year category for Leite Derramado
- 2013: Casa de las Américas prize for Spilt Milk (Leche derramada, Leite derramado), winner of narrative fiction.
- 2019: Camões Prize

== Discography ==
- 1966: Chico Buarque de Hollanda (Vol. 1)
- 1966: Morte e Vida Severina
- 1967: Chico Buarque de Hollanda (Vol. 2)
- 1968: Chico Buarque de Hollanda (Vol. 3)
- 1969: Umas e outras – compacto
- 1969: Chico Buarque na Itália
- 1970: Apesar de você
- 1970: Per un pugno di samba
- 1970: Chico Buarque de Hollanda (Vol. 4)
- 1971: Construção
- 1972: Quando o carnaval chegar
- 1972: Caetano e Chico - juntos e ao vivo
- 1973: Chico canta, mildly edited by the censors of the Brazilian military government both in lyrics and title, it was originally called "Chico Canta Calabar".
- 1974: Sinal fechado
- 1975: Chico Buarque & Maria Bethânia ao vivo
- 1976: Meus Caros Amigos
- 1977: Cio da Terra compacto
- 1977: Os saltimbancos
- 1977: Gota d'água
- 1978: Chico Buarque
- 1979: Ópera do Malandro
- 1980: Vida
- 1980: Show 1º de Maio compacto
- 1981: Almanaque
- 1981: Saltimbancos trapalhões
- 1982: Chico Buarque en espanhol
- 1983: Para viver um grande amor
- 1983: O grande circo místico
- 1984: Chico Buarque (Vermelho)
- 1985: O Corsário do rei
- 1985: Ópera do Malandro
- 1985: Malandro
- 1986: Melhores momentos de Chico & Caetano
- 1987: Francisco
- 1988: Dança da meia-lua
- 1989: Chico Buarque
- 1990: Chico Buarque ao vivo Paris le Zenith
- 1992: Convite Para Ouvir
- 1993: Para Todos
- 1995: Uma palavra
- 1997: Terra
- 1998: As cidades
- 1998: Chico Buarque da Mangueira
- 1999: Chico ao vivo
- 2001: Chico e as cidades (DVD)
- 2001: Cambaio
- 2002: Chico Buarque – Duetos
- 2003: Chico ou o país da delicadeza perdida (DVD)
- 2005: Meu Caro Amigo (DVD)
- 2005: A Flor da Pele (DVD)
- 2005: Vai passar (DVD)
- 2005: Anos Dourados (DVD)
- 2005: Estação Derradeira (DVD)
- 2005: Bastidores (DVD)
- 2006: O Futebol (DVD)
- 2006: Romance (DVD)
- 2006: Uma Palavra (DVD)
- 2006: Carioca (CD + DVD with the documentary Desconstrução)
- 2007: Carioca Ao Vivo
- 2011: Chico Buarque
- 2012: Na Carreira (DVD)
- 2017: Caravanas
- 2018: "Caravanas - Ao vivo"

== Other works ==
Books
- 1966: A Banda (Songbook)
- 1974: Fazenda Modelo
- 1979: Chapeuzinho Amarelo
- 1981: A Bordo do Rui Barbosa
- 1991: Estorvo
- 1995: Benjamin
- 2003: Budapeste
- 2009: Leite Derramado
- 2014: O Irmão Alemão (published in English as My German Brother )
- 2019: Essa Gente
- 2021: Anos de Chumbo
Plays
- 1967/8: Roda Viva
- 1973: Calabar (co-authored with Ruy Guerra)
- 1975: Gota d'água
- 1978: Ópera do Malandro (based on John Gay's Beggar's Opera and Bertolt Brecht's Threepenny Opera)
- 1983: O Grande Circo Místico
Film
- 1972: Quando o carnaval chegar (coauthor)
- 1983: Para viver um grande amor (coauthor)
- 1985: Ópera do Malandro
- 2001: Water and Salt (actor)
- 2009: Budapeste (based on his book)

== In popular culture ==
The cover art of the Buarque's 1966 album Chico Buarque de Hollanda became a viral internet meme with "happy" Chico and "sad" Chico.
