= Música popular brasileira =

Trend in post-bossa nova urban popular music in Brazil

Brazilian popular music
- Native name: Música popular brasileira (MPB)
- Stylistic origins: Bossa nova • samba • samba-canção • baião • jazz • rock • Brazilian regional styles
- Cultural origins: Mid-to-late 1960s, Brazil

Música popular brasileira (Portuguese pronunciation: [ˈmuzikɐ popuˈlaʁ bɾaziˈlejɾɐ], "Brazilian popular music") or MPB is a trend in post-bossa nova urban popular music in Brazil that revisits typical Brazilian styles such as samba, samba-canção and baião and other Brazilian regional music, combining them with foreign influences, such as jazz and rock.

This movement has produced and is represented by many Brazilian artists, such as Dorival Caymmi, Jorge Ben Jor, Caetano Veloso, Gal Costa, Djavan, Novos Baianos, Tom Jobim, Chico Buarque, Belchior and Elis Regina, whose individual styles generated their own trends within the genre. The term often also describes any kind of music with Brazilian origins and "voice and guitar style" that arose in the late 1960s.

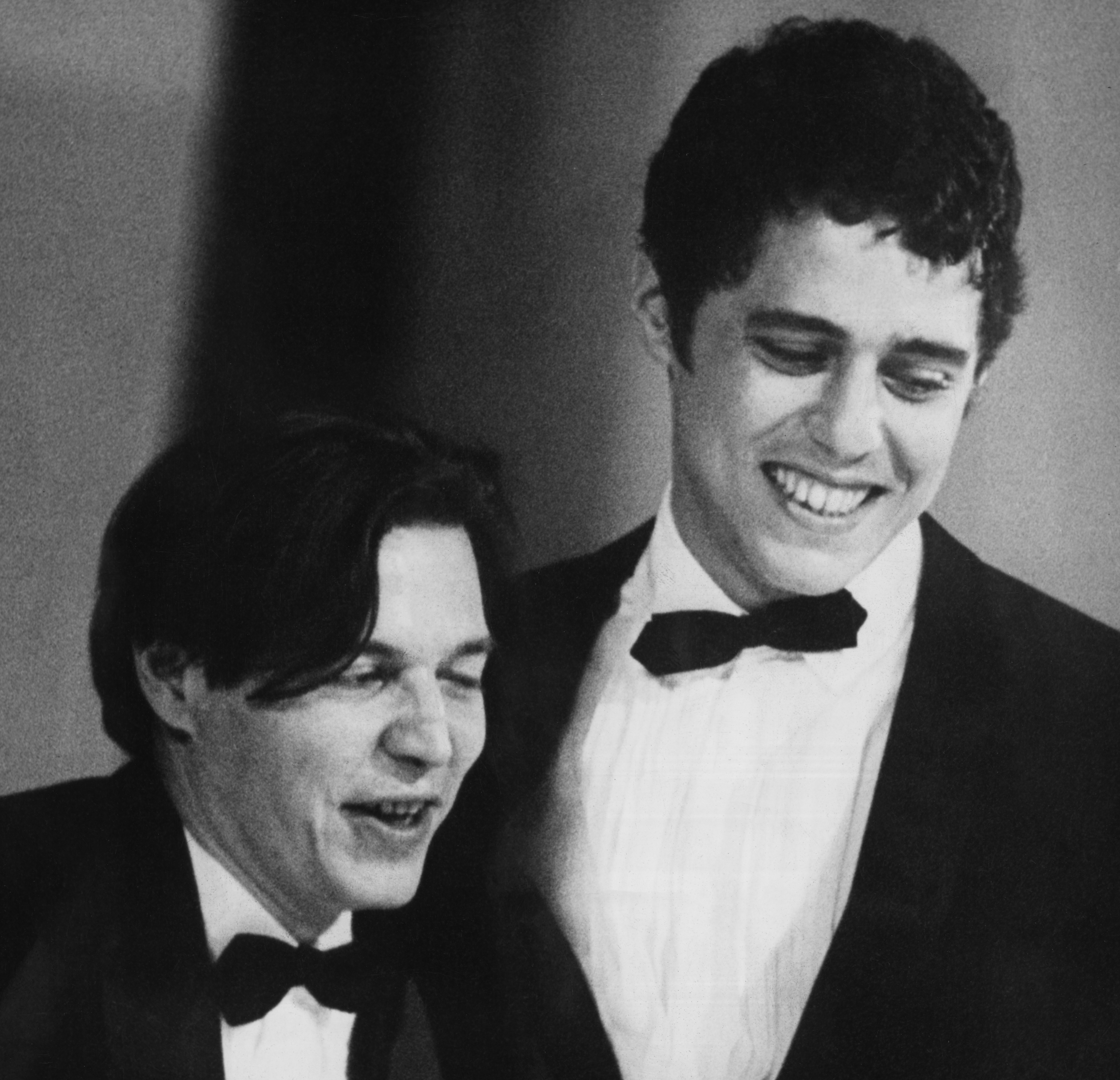
Tom Jobim and Chico Buarque at the Festival Internacional da Canção

Variations within MPB were the short-lived but influential artistic movement known as tropicália, and the music of samba rock.

MPB songs are in part characterized by their harmonic complexity and their elaborate lyrics, which call back to a connection between Brazil's popular music and poetry that has been culturally relevant since the 1920s. It also draws from themes from Brazil's folk music as a part of an effort to create a musical style that reflected true Brazilian culture. During the 1970s, these qualities gave the style an intellectual prestige that made it more popular for listening as an art form rather than being used as music for dancing, further distinguishing it from other popular music of the time. However, this was not always the case, as demonstrated by music by artists such as Jorge Ben Jor, many of whose songs fall into the category of dance music.

Many of the albums on Rolling Stone Brazil's list of the 100 greatest Brazilian albums fall under the MPB style.

== History ==
MPB, loosely understood as a "style", debuted in the mid-1960s, with the acronym being applied to types of non-electric music that emerged following the beginning, rise and evolution of bossa nova. MPB artists and audiences were largely connected to the intellectual and student population, causing later MPB to be known as "university music." Over time, the definition of MPB expanded to include a wider variety of music that was popular in Brazil, including rock music, which was not initially under the umbrella due to its foreign origins.

=== Initial success ===
Like bossa nova, MPB was an attempt to produce a "national" Brazilian music that drew from traditional styles. MPB made a considerable impact in the 1960s, thanks largely to several televised music festivals. The beginning of MPB is often associated with Elis Regina's interpretation of Vinícius de Moraes and Edu Lobo's "Arrastão." In 1965, one month after celebrating her 20th birthday, Elis appeared on the nationally broadcast Festival de Música Popular Brasileira and performed the song. Elis recorded "Arrastão" and released the song as a single, which became the biggest-selling single in Brazilian music history at that time and catapulted her to stardom. This brought MPB to a national Brazilian audience and many artists have since performed in the style over the years.

Thanks to an economic boom in Brazil through the 1960s and 1970s, an expanding working and middle class had greater access to television, which became a substantial vehicle for the consumption and spread of MPB. Musical showcases such as Festival de Música Popular Brasileira turned out to be a massive success, and the stations TV-Record and FIC most notably competed in a ratings battle that resulted in greatly expanding the audience of Brazilian Popular Music. In particular, the shows O Fino da Bossa and Jovem Guarda achieved a great deal of media attention and praise, with the former being attributed to taking part in the creation of MPB. The successes of both prompted the live broadcasting of more vibrant music festivals. These events were more like competitions, and artists first had to go through a lengthy submission process before being given the chance to perform in front of a panel of judges as well as a live audience. The music festivals further expanded viewership while also increasing the competition between artists for airtime and stations for better ratings.

=== MPB in telenovelas ===
Brazilian telenovelas in the early 1970s featured MPB hits by big-name artists of the time such as Elis Regina, Gilberto Gil, and Caetano Veloso among others in the soundtracks of the shows. The telenovelas were huge commercial successes, with CDs of the soundtracks regularly topping sales charts. As time passed and MPB diversified, telenovela soundtracks followed suit, featuring MPB artists but also including newly popular songs considered outside the style, such as rock music and more mainstream pop. Despite concerns at the time about the telenovelas having too large of a role in shaping the Brazilian pop music that became mainstream, they have become one of the only public outlets that still continuously broadcast MPB up to the present day. Because the widespread success of Brazilian telenovelas enabled them to reach an international market, their soundtracks, many of which include MPB songs, have also been commercially successful abroad.

=== MPB and censorship ===
Throughout its existence, artists making MPB often challenged the existing political structure through their music. This includes releasing songs with lyrics criticizing the Brazilian government of the 1960s and 1970s. For example, Chico Buarque released the song "Apesar de Você" in 1970. The lyrics used an abusive romantic relationship as a metaphor for the oppression by the Brazilian government. The lyrics avoided direct censorship until roughly a year later.

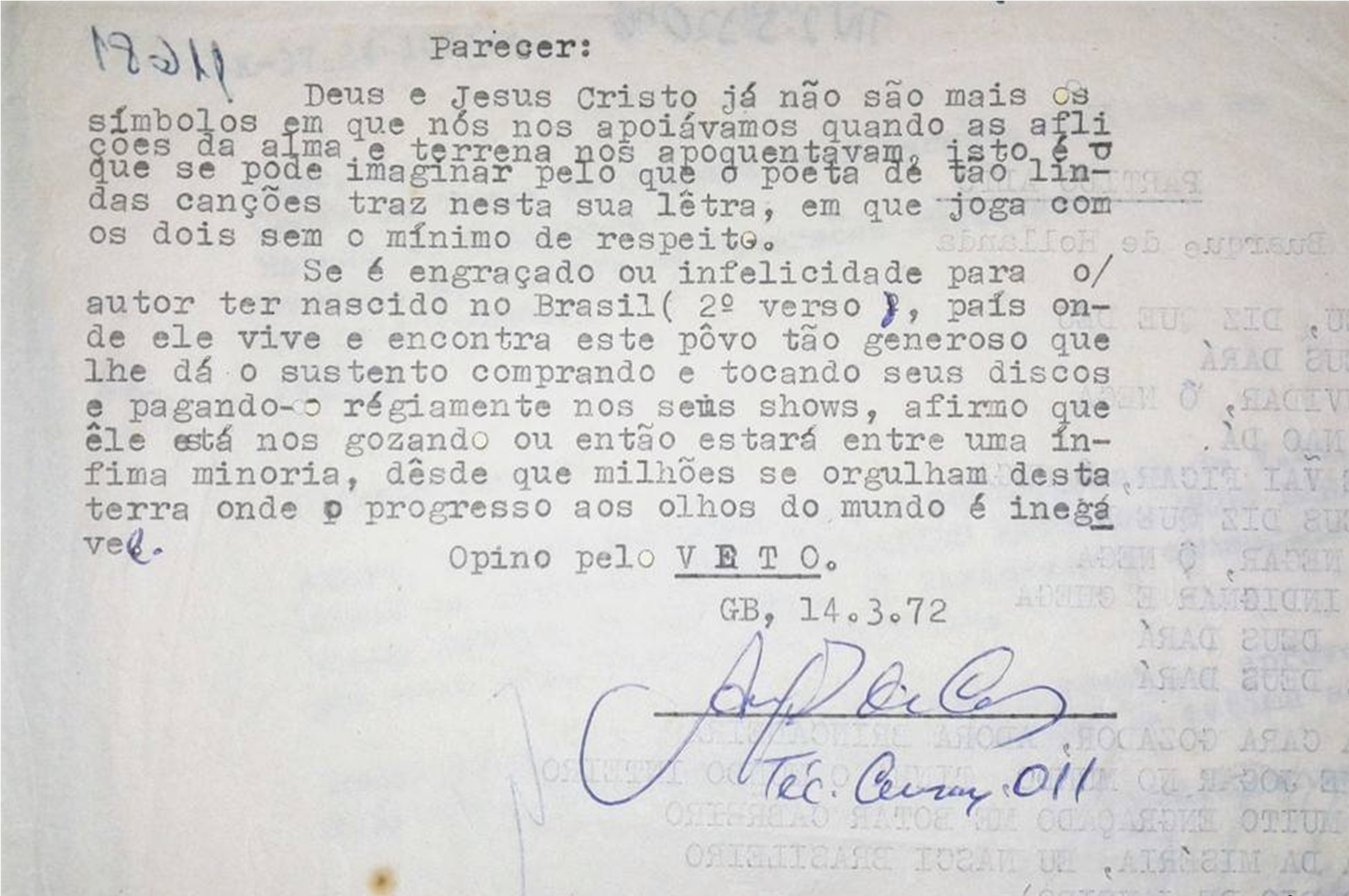
A recommendation from a censor that the song "Partido Alto" by Chico Buarque be prohibited

=== MPB after the 1960s ===
In the wake of increased government censorship on art forms such as music in the early 1970s, artists became much more limited in the music they could produce, and those who refused to conform to the standards set by the law risked exile. As a result, the number of innovative artists and songs that were broadcast dropped, and likewise, the program ratings. However, efforts by television stations as well as record companies for music that met the standard set by the music festivals of the 1960s continued, with the television festival Abertura being one such example. While Abertura featured many up-and-coming artists, press commentary rarely considered them to be as good as MPB from the 1960s. From this emerged a debate about the role of television in broadcasting song and performance. On one side, some television producers attached a duty to revitalizing the creativity within the Brazilian popular music scene. Critics of this argued that the best of the current creative pool had already been exhausted by the music festivals and that the continuous output of MPB served more as a detriment to the industry than a benefit. Despite this, attempts by television and record companies at recreating the music festivals of the 1960s continued with various programs into the 1980s, which was met with only modest success. In the early 2000s, the company IBM organized some Internet-based festivals with votes cast online by the audience rather than by a jury. This fared better than the television attempts two decades before, but did not achieve the sweeping success of programs from the 1960s.

== See also ==
- Latin Grammy Award for Best MPB Album
