= Ornella Vanoni discography =

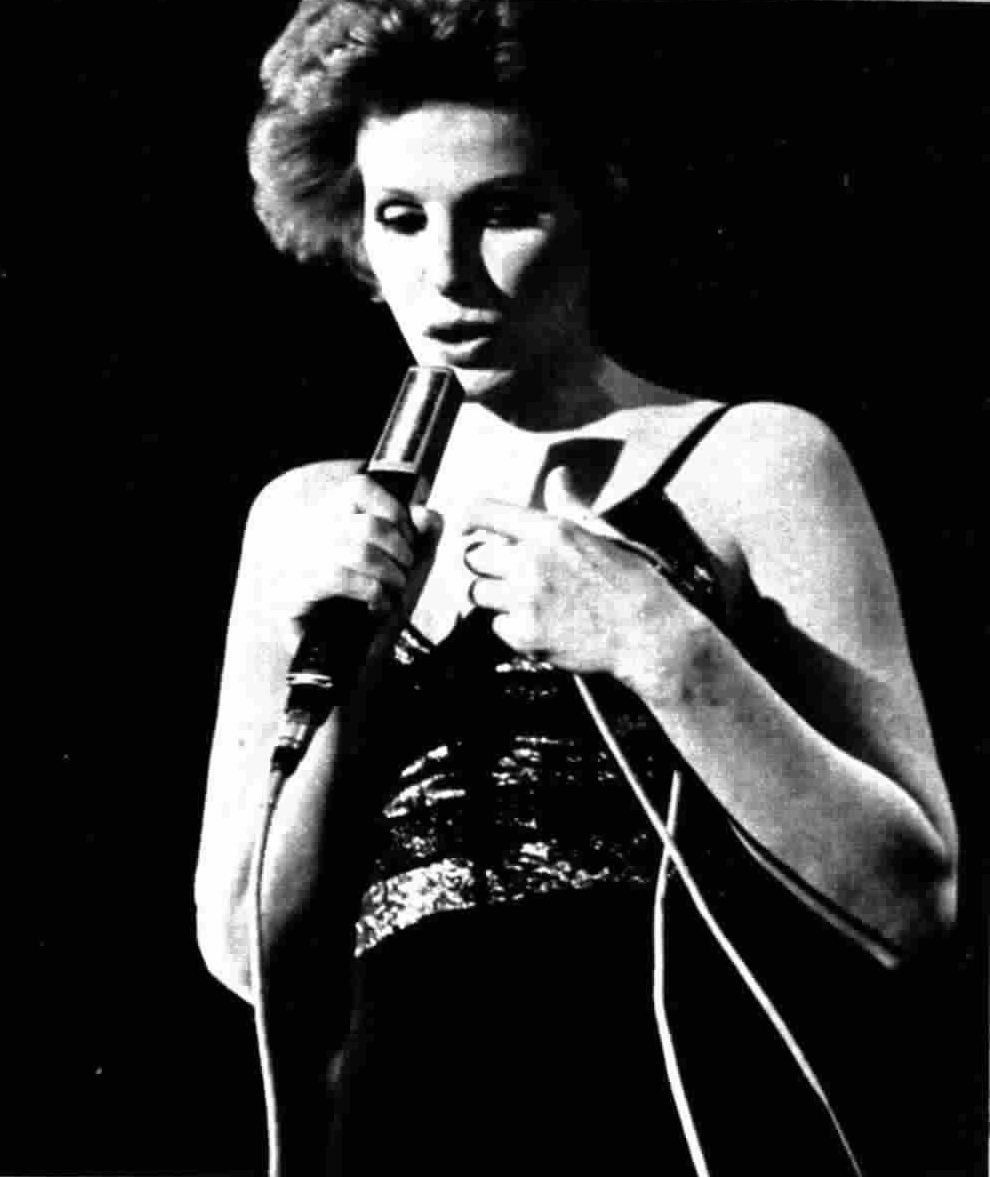
- Vanoni performing at the Teatro Olimpico in Rome in January 1974
- Studio albums: 45
- EPs: 7
- Soundtrack albums: 3
- Live albums: 7
- Compilation albums: 59

Italian singer Ornella Vanoni released forty-five studio albums, seven live albums, fifty-nine official compilation albums, two video albums and seven extended plays.

== Albums ==
=== Studio albums ===
Title	Album details	Peak chart positions			Sales	Certifications
Title	Album details	ITA	EU	SWI	Sales	Certifications
Ornella Vanoni	Released: December 1961; Label: Ricordi; Formats: LP, CD, digital	—	—	—		
Le canzoni di Ornella Vanoni	Released: December 1963; Label: Ricordi; Formats: LP, CD, digital	—	—	—		
Caldo	Released: April 1965; Label: Ricordi; Formats: LP, CD, digital	7	—	—		
Ornella	Released: April 1966; Label: Ricordi; Formats: LP, CD, digital	—	—	—		
Ornella Vanoni	Released: 1967; Label: Ariston; Formats: LP, MC, CD, digital	5	—	—		
Ai miei amici cantautori	Released: 1968; Label: Ariston; Formats: LP, MC, CD, digital	6	—	—		
Io sì – Ai miei amici cantautori n.2	Released: 1970; Label: Ariston; Formats: LP, MC, CD, digital	3	—	—		
Appuntamento con Ornella Vanoni	Released: 1970; Label: Ariston; Formats: LP, MC, CD, digital	5	—	—		
Un gioco senza età	Released: 1972; Label: Ariston; Formats: LP, MC, CD, digital	4	—	—		
Dettagli	Released: March 1973; Label: Ariston; Formats: LP, MC, 8-Trk, CD, digital	2	—	—		
Ornella Vanoni e altre storie	Released: 1973; Label: Ariston; Formats: LP, MC, CD, digital	3	—	—		
Quei giorni insieme a te	Released: April 1974; Label: Ariston; Formats: LP, MC, CD, digital	17	—	—		
A un certo punto...	Released: 1974; Label: Vanilla; Formats: LP, MC, 8-Trk, CD, digital	2	—	—		
La voglia di sognare	Released: 1974; Label: Vanilla; Formats: LP, MC, 8-Trk, CD, digital	6	—	—		
Uomo mio bambino mio	Released: 1975; Label: Vanilla; Formats: LP, MC, 8-Trk, CD, digital	5	—	—		
La voglia, la pazzia, l'incoscienza, l'allegria (with Vinicius de Moraes and Toquinho)	Released: April 1976; Label: Vanilla; Formats: LP, MC, 8-Trk, CD, digital	6	—	—		
Più	Released: 1976; Label: Vanilla; Formats: LP, MC, 8-Trk, CD, digital	5	—	—		
Io dentro	Released: 1977; Label: Vanilla; Formats: LP, MC, 8-Trk, CD, digital	7	—	—		
Io fuori	Released: 1977; Label: Vanilla; Formats: LP, MC, 8-Trk, CD, digital	7	—	—		
Vanoni	Released: 1978; Label: Vanilla; Formats: LP, MC, CD, digital	9	—	—		
Ricetta di donna	Released: 1980; Label: CGD, Vanilla; Formats: LP, MC, CD, digital	11	—	—		
Duemilatrecentouno parole	Released: 1981; Label: CGD, Vanilla; Formats: LP, MC, CD, digital	6	—	—		
Uomini	Released: 1984; Label: CGD, Vanilla; Formats: LP, MC, CD, digital	8	—	—		
Ornella &...	Released: 27 August 1986; Label: CGD; Formats: LP, MC, CD, digital	6	—	—		
O	Released: 30 July 1987; Label: CGD; Formats: LP, MC, CD, digital	17	—	—		
Il giro del mio mondo	Released: 7 February 1989; Label: CGD, Vanilla; Formats: LP, MC, CD, digital	13	—	—		
Quante storie	Released: 26 October 1990; Label: CGD, Vanilla; Formats: LP, MC, CD, digital	—	—	—		
Stella nascente	Released: 15 September 1992; Label: CGD, Vanilla; Formats: CD, LP, MC, digital	14	93	—		
Sheherazade	Released: 1995; Label: CGD East West; Formats: CD, MC, digital	19	—	—		
Argilla	Released: 15 October 1997; Label: CGD East West; Formats: CD, MC, digital	17	83	—		
Un panino una birra e poi...	Released: 2 April 2001; Label: CGD East West; Formats: CD, MC, digital	8	—	—		
E poi... la tua bocca da baciare	Released: 16 November 2001; Label: Epic; Formats: CD, MC, digital	19	—	—		
Sogni proibiti: Ornella e le canzoni di Bacharach	Released: 2002; Label: Epic; Formats: CD, MC, digital	15	—	—		
Noi, le donne noi	Released: 26 September 2003; Label: Epic, Sony; Formats: CD, digital	19	—	—		
Ti ricordi? No non mi ricordo (with Gino Paoli)	Released: 30 October 2004; Label: Columbia, Sony; Formats: CD, MC, digital	8	—	—		FIMI: Platinum
Una bellissima ragazza	Released: 28 September 2007; Label: Epic, Sony BMG; Formats: CD, digital	9	—	—		
Più di me	Released: 17 October 2008; Label: Columbia, Sony BMG; Formats: CD, digital	3	—	72	ITA: 190,000	FIMI: 2× Platinum
Più di te	Released: 13 November 2009; Label: Columbia, Sony; Formats: CD, digital	11	—	—		FIMI: Gold
Meticci (Io mi fermo qui)	Released: 10 September 2013; Label: Columbia, Sony; Formats: CD, digital	6	—	—		
Unica	Released: 29 January 2021; Label: Ricordi, BMG; Formats: CD, LP, digital	3	—	54		
Diverse	Released: 18 October 2024; Label: Ricordi, BMG; Formats: CD, LP, digital	13	—	—		
"—" denotes a recording that did not chart or was not released in that territory.

=== Live albums ===
Title	Album details	Peak chart positions
Title	Album details	ITA
..Ah! l'amore l'amore quante cose fa fare l'amore..	Released: 1971; Label: Ariston; Formats: LP, MC, CD, digital	4
Insieme (with Gino Paoli)	Released: 1985; Label: CGD; Formats: LP, MC, CD, digital	3
...Adesso Live Album	Released: 1999; Label: CGD East West; Formats: CD, MC, digital	—
I concerti live @ RTSI	Released: 2001; Label: RTSI, S4; Formats: CD, MC, DVD, digital	—
Vanoni Paoli Live (with Gino Paoli)	Released: 23 September 2005; Label: Columbia, Sony BMG; Formats: CD, digital	11
Live al Blue Note	Released: 5 October 2010; Label: Columbia, Sony; Formats: CD, digital	20
Calma rivoluzionaria (Live 2023)	Released: 1 December 2023; Label: BMG; Formats: CD, LP, digital	—
"—" denotes a recording that did not chart or was not released in that territory.

=== Compilation albums ===
Title	Album details	Peak chart positions
Title	Album details	ITA
Ornella Vanoni e Leonardo (with Leonardo)	Released: 1968; Label: Ariston; Formats: MC	—
Scelta sicura: ritratto di Ornella	Released: 23 December 1969; Label: Ricordi; Formats: MC	—
Brave, bravissime! (with Milva, Mina and Iva Zanicchi)	Released: 1970; Label: Ri-Fi; Formats: LP, MC, 8-Trk	—
I successi di Ornella Vanoni	Released: 20 July 1970; Label: Ricordi; Formats: MC	—
...io canto per amore (with Milva, Mina and Iva Zanicchi)	Released: 1971; Label: Ricordi; Formats: LP, MC	—
L'amore	Released: July 1972; Label: Ricordi; Formats: LP, MC, 8-Trk	4
Vanoni Hits	Released: August 1972; Label: Ariston; Formats: LP, MC	16
Questa sera...	Released: 9 April 1973; Label: Ricordi; Formats: LP, MC	—
Gino Paoli – Ornella Vanoni (with Gino Paoli)	Released: 15 June 1973; Label: Ricordi; Formats: MC	—
Ornella mai...	Released: September 1974; Label: Ariston; Formats: LP, MC	—
Ornella sempre...	Released: September 1974; Label: Ariston; Formats: LP, MC	—
Ornella Vanoni	Released: 1974; Label: Super Oscar; Formats: LP	—
The Hits of Ornella Vanoni	Released: 1974; Label: Super Oscar; Formats: LP	—
L'oro di Ornella	Released: 1975; Label: Ariston; Formats: LP, CD	—
Incontro con... (with Milva, Mina and Iva Zanicchi)	Released: September 1975; Label: Penny; Formats: LP	—
Malamore di Ornella	Released: 1976; Label: Oxford, Super Oscar; Formats: LP, MC	—
Ornella sempre	Released: April 1976; Label: Ricordi; Formats: LP, MC, 8-Trk, CD	—
Canzoni da films	Released: 1976; Label: Super Oscar; Formats: LP, MC, 8-Tr	—
Ornella International	Released: 1976; Label: Super Oscar; Formats: LP, MC, CD	—
Oggi le canto così, n. 1	Released: 1979; Label: Vanilla; Formats: LP, MC, digital	23
Meu Brasil	Released: 1980; Label: Record Bazaar; Formats: LP, MC	—
Canzoni d'autore	Released: 1980; Label: Record Bazaar; Formats: LP, MC	—
Oggi le canto così, n. 2: Paoli e Tenco	Released: 1980; Label: CGD, Vanilla; Formats: LP, MC, CD, digital	—
Ornella Vanoni	Released: 1981; Label: Oxford; Formats: 3x LP	—
Ornella Vanoni	Released: 1982; Label: Profili Musicali; Formats: LP, MC	—
Oggi le canto così, n. 3: Le canzoni della mala	Released: 1982; Label: CGD, Vanilla; Formats: LP, MC, digital	—
Oggi le canto così, n. 4: Raccolta di successi	Released: 1982; Label: CGD, Vanilla; Formats: LP, MC, digital	—
Ornella Vanoni	Released: 1984; Label: Ricordi; Formats: 3x LP	—
...sempre (with Gino Paoli)	Released: 1985; Label: Ariston; Formats: 2x LP, MC	20
Il meglio di Ornella Vanoni	Released: 1985; Label: Dischi Ricordi; Formats: CD	—
Mina Ornella (with Mina)	Released: 1986; Label: CGD; Formats: LP, MC, CD	21
Infine per me (with Gino Paoli)	Released: 1986; Label: Ariston; Formats: MC	—
Vanoni Mina (with Mina)	Released: 1986; Label: Ariston; Formats: LP	—
Parole d'amore (with Gino Paoli)	Released: 1987; Label: Durium; Formats: LP	—
Dettagli	Released: 1990; Label: Targa; Formats: LP, CD	—
L'appuntamento...	Released: 1990; Label: Ricordi; Formats: LP, MC, CD	—
Così cantiamo l'amore (with Fiorella Mannoia)	Released: 1991; Label: Targa; Formats: LP, MC, CD	—
Un altro appuntamento	Released: 1992; Label: Raretone; Formats: LP, CD, MC	17
In più (Diciassette canzoni che vi ricanterei volentieri)	Released: 1993; Label: CGD; Formats: CD, MC, digital	—
I miei ieri	Released: 1994; Label: CGD; Formats: CD	—
Ore d'amore	Released: 1994; Label: Dischi Ricordi; Formats: CD	—
I successi di Ornella Vanoni	Released: 1995; Label: Ricordi; Formats: CD, MC	—
Del mio meglio	Released: 1995; Label: Ricordi; Formats: CD, MC, LP, digital	—
Le origini	Released: 1996; Label: Ricordi; Formats: CD, digital	—
Ornella Vanoni	Released: 1996; Label: Ricordi; Formats: CD	—
Ornella Vanoni	Released: 1999; Label: Ricordi; Formats: CD	—
I grandi successi originali	Released: 2000; Label: Ricordi; Formats: CD, MC	—
Ornella Vanoni (I miti)	Released: 2000; Label: Ricordi; Formats: CD, digital	—
Le più belle canzoni di Ornella Vanoni	Released: 2003; Label: Warner; Formats: CD, MC	13
Le più belle canzoni di Ornella Vanoni	Released: 2005; Label: Warner; Formats: CD	—
Ornella Vanoni	Released: 2005; Label: Sony BMG, Ricordi; Formats: CD, digital	—
Superissimi – gli eroi del Juke Box	Released: 2006; Label: Ricordi; Formats: CD, digital	—
Le più belle di...	Released: 2007; Label: Ricordi; Formats: CD	—
Semplicemente Ornella Vanoni – I grandi successi	Released: 2008; Label: Rhino Records; Formats: CD	—
I grandi successi	Released: 2008; Label: Rhino Records; Formats: CD	—
Collections	Released: 2009; Label: Sony; Formats: CD	—
Un'ora con...	Released: 2012; Label: RCA; Formats: CD	—
Ornella Vanoni	Released: 2013; Label: Warner; Formats: CD	—
Un pugno di stelle	Released: 9 February 2018; Label: RCA; Formats: CD, digital	23
"—" denotes a recording that did not chart or was not released in that territory.

=== Cast recordings ===
Title	Album details
Rugantino: A Roman Musical Spectacle	Released: 1963; Label: Warner Bros.; Formats: LP, MC, digital
Amori miei	Released: March 1976; Label: Vanilla; Formats: LP, digital
I quattro musicanti	Released: 1981; Label: Fonit Cetra; Formats: LP

=== Foreign albums ===
Title	Album details
La Vanoni en Español	Released: 1968 (Venezuela); Label: Velvet; Formats: LP
Album	Released: 1977 (France); Label: Decca; Formats: LP
Licht und Schatten	Released: 1982 (Germany); Label: Ariola; Formats: LP
Ornella Vanoni	Released: 1986 (France); Label: Le Chant du Monde; Formats: LP, MC

== EPs ==
Title	EP details
Le canzoni della malavita	Released: 1958; Label: Ricordi; Formats: LP
Le canzoni della malavita, vol. 2	Released: 1959; Label: Ricordi; Formats: LP
Ornella Vanoni e Joe Sentieri a Canzonissima (with Joe Sentieri)	Released: 1961; Label: Ricordi; Formats: LP
Ornella Vanoni in "Rugantino"	Released: 1963; Label: Ricordi; Formats: LP
C'eri anche tu	Released: 1964; Label: Ricordi; Formats: LP
Abbracciami forte	Released: 1965; Label: Ricordi; Formats: LP
Io ti darò di più	Released: 1966; Label: Ricordi; Formats: LP
