= La gatta =

Single by Gino Paoli

from the album Gino Paoli
- B-side: "Io vivo nella luna"
- Released: 1960
- Genre: pop
- Length: 2:16
- Label: Dischi Ricordi
- Songwriter: Gino Paoli

Gino Paoli singles chronology
"Dedicato a te" (1959)	"La gatta" (1960)	"Co-eds" (1960)

Audio
- "La gatta" on YouTube

"La gatta" (lit. 'The She-Cat') is a 1960 song written and recorded by Gino Paoli.

== Background ==
The song is a nostalgic autobiographical portrait of Paoli's simple, bohémien life in his small apartment in Boccadasse, Genoa. According to Paoli, the cat represented "all my hopes, my romanticism, my desire to look up in the air, to look at the sky".

Initially, the single was a resounding fiasco, selling only 119 copies in about three months. In the following months, without any promotion and thanks to word of mouth it eventually proved to be a surprise hit and Paoli's breakthrough, selling up to over one hundred thousand copies in a week. In 2012, Paoli adapted the song in an illustrated book for children.

== Cover versions ==
Artists who also recorded the song include Ornella Vanoni, Gianni Morandi, Little Tony, Róisín Murphy, Skip Battin and Carla Boni. In 2011, Paoli recorded a new version of the song titled "La chatta" in a duet with Daniele Silvestri for Silvestri's album S.C.O.T.C.H.

== Track listing ==
No.	Title	Writer(s)	Length
1.	"La gatta"	Gino Paoli	2:16
2.	"Io vivo nella luna"	Gino Paoli	2:49

== Charts ==
Chart (1960)	Peak position
Italy (Musica e dischi)	13
