= Meu Pai Oxalá =

Portuguese-language song by Vinícius de Moraes

Song by Vinícius de Moraes and Toquinho
- English title: My Lord Oxalá
- Released: 1973
- Genre: Samba
- Songwriters: Vinícius de Moraes; Toquinho

"Meu Pai Oxalá" (Portuguese for My Lord Oxalá) is a song written by Vinícius de Moraes and Toquinho in 1973. This samba composition, which is heavily influenced by the Afro-Brazilian religion of Candomblé, was first performed by the duo. There are also versions performed by each of them solely. A well-known version was released by Daniela Mercury on her 2005 album Balé Mulato.

== History and meaning ==
In 1970 in Uruguay Vinicius had married actress Gesse Gessy, the latter of whom made him deeply immerse himself in the Candomblé universe, as can be observed in this composition. The song recovers African values both in the narrative, which goes back to the legends and/or mythological character of the religion of African origin, as it introduces in the singing instruments characteristic of that culture. Not that this was new, since Vinícius had already experimented, with Baden Powell in the 1966 album Os Afro-sambas. The difference is that in the 1960s, those compositions were made as if in a flirtatious relationship while, in the 1970s, the relationship with candomblé and its mysteries is that of a seeker. At this stage, the religious content of the songs comes from a syncretism, as the poet is questioning the mystical values of his early religious training and incorporating other values, other beliefs such as candomblé, that he has internalized and that are part of his sensibility as a poet.
