= Sapore di sale =

Single by Gino Paoli

from the album Basta chiudere gli occhi
- B-side: "La nostra casa"
- Released: 1963
- Genre: Pop
- Length: 3:30
- Label: RCA Italiana
- Songwriter: Gino Paoli

Gino Paoli singles chronology
"Le cose dell'amore" (1963)	"Sapore di sale" (1963)	"Che cosa c'è" (1963)

"Sapore di sale" (It. for "Taste of salt") is a song written and originally recorded by Italian singer Gino Paoli, in 1963.

== Background ==
As its composer also corroborated, "Sapore di sale" was composed in Capo d'Orlando, Sicily, "in a deserted house near a deserted beach," where Paoli was to hold concerts in a dance hall with his band and the venue's owner invited them to extend their stay for a fortnight. At the time, Paoli was married to Anna Fabbri but was carrying on an affair with young actress Stefania Sandrelli, the affair resulting in the birth of daughter Amanda Sandrelli. As Sandrelli claimed, "Sapore di sale" was inspired by her.

== Production ==
The song was recorded in Rome in 1963, on an arrangement by Ennio Morricone who also conducted the orchestra. Gato Barbieri performed the sax solo.

== Charts ==
Chart (1963–64)	Peak position
Argentina (CAPIF)	6
Brazil (IBOPE)	6
Italy (Musica e dischi)	2
Spain (AFYVE)	8

== Release ==
The song was released as a single in 1963 by RCA Italiana. Paoli entered the Cantagiro music festival with it.

== Notable covers ==
- Gino Paoli had some success in Spain where, in October 1964, his Spanish-language version reached the 8th place in the hit parade.
- Arsen Dedić covered the song in Serbo-Croatian in 1965 as "Ukus soli".
