= Vinícius & Toquinho =

Studio album by Vinícius de Moraes & Toquinho
- Released: 1974
- Genre: Bossa nova, MPB
- Length: 36:08
- Label: Philips
- Producer: Paulinho Tapajós

Vinícius & Toquinho is a 1974 album by Toquinho in partnership with Vinicius de Moraes.

== Track listing ==
#	Title	Songwriters	Length
1.	"Como É Duro Trabalhar"	Toquinho, Vinícius de Moraes	3:42
2.	"Samba da Volta"	Toquinho, Vinícius de Moraes	2:51
3.	"A Carta Que Não Foi Mandada"	Toquinho, Vinícius de Moraes	2:51
4.	"Triste Sertão"	Toquinho, Vinícius de Moraes	3:06
5.	"Carta ao Tom 74"	Toquinho, Vinicius de Moraes	2:36
6.	"Canto e Contraponto" (feat. Quarteto em Cy)	Toquinho, Vinicius de Moraes	3:02
7.	"Samba pra Vinícius" (feat. Chico Buarque)	Toquinho, Chico Buarque	2:32
8.	"Sem Medo"	Toquinho, Vinicius de Moraes	3:37
9.	"Samba do Jato"	Toquinho, Vinicius de Moraes	3:39
10.	"As Cores de Abril"	Toquinho, Vinicius de Moraes	3:58
11.	"Tudo na Mais Santa Paz"	Toquinho, Vinicius de Moraes	3:38

== Personnel ==
- Toquinho – arrangements, vocals, acoustic guitar, viola, piano
- Vinícius de Morais - lyrics
- Edu Lobo – arrangements
- Francis Hime – arrangements
- Zé Roberto – arrangements
- Orlando Costa-Luigi - recording
