= Senza fine =

- Standard cover art

Song by Gino Paoli and Ornella Vanoni
- Written: 1961
- Genre: Pop
- Length: 2:51
- Songwriter: Gino Paoli

"Senza fine" (which translates in English to "Without End") is a song written by Italian singer-songwriter Gino Paoli, inspired by collaboration partner Ornella Vanoni. Vanoni was the first person to record the song which was released as a single in September 1961. The song version sung by Paoli went on to chart at No. 7 on the Italian Top 50.

== Background ==
Memory Records, to whom Vanoni was linked contractually, wanted to rebrand the singer with a new sexy image, detaching her from her previous one.

"Senza fine" is based on an initial round of E flat, introduced by an accordion and a string section. The song is based on a French- style waltz base. The song has the peculiarity of ending by fading, unlike most of the songs of that period.

The version of the song recorded by Gino Paoli on the album was originally only for voice and piano. However, after the success of the single recorded by Ornella Vanoni, which was built on a more elaborate arrangement, Memory Records decided that Gino Paoli's version would also have the same arrangement. In order to adapt the arrangement created for Vanoni to the voice of Paoli it was decided to speed up the magnetic tapes, and this is the version on the B side of the 45 rpm.

== Critical reception ==
The original version of "Senza fine" by Ornella Vanoni, managed to climb the ranking of the best-selling singles in Italy, reaching the tenth position. Following the success of Vanoni's single, the single by Gino Paoli entered the charts on 23 September 1961 at the seventh position, rising to the fifth position the following week, and in total the single remained among the top ten for four weeks. At the end of the year, Gino Paoli's version turned out to be the eighty-fifth best-selling record, while Vanoni's was the fifty-sixth.

== Covers and appearances ==
"Senza fine" has been the subject of numerous covers over the years, among which are those of Miranda Martino, Dean Martin, Peggy Lee, and Mike Patton. The song was incorporated into the 1965 motion picture The Flight of the Phoenix. Covers of that version were released in 1966 by Connie Francis, as "The Phoenix Love Theme," and by The Brass Ring, as "Love Theme From The Flight Of The Phoenix".

"Senza fine" is performed in the 1972 Billy Wilder film Avanti!, the 2003 Isabel Coixet film My Life Without Me and the 2004 François Ozon film 5x2, and also appears in the 2002 horror film Ghost Ship, sung by singer Monica Mancini, although in the film the song is sung by the character played by Francesca Rettondini.

Parts of the song are also used in the pilot for Rod Serling's Night Gallery television series, Episode 1, Segment 3, "The Escape Route", when the main character, Josef Strobe, looks at a painting of a fisherman and imagines himself in the painting.
