= Ornella Vanoni =

Italian singer (1934–2025)

Ornella Vanoni OMRI
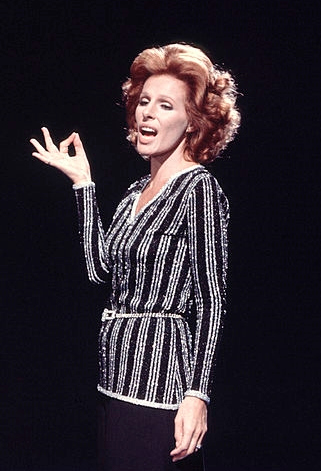
- Vanoni in concert in 1973

Background information
- Born: 22 September 1934; Milan, Kingdom of Italy
- Died: 21 November 2025 (aged 91) Milan, Italy
- Genres: Pop; traditional pop; jazz; soul; bossa nova
- Occupations: Singer; songwriter; actress
- Works: Discography
- Years active: 1956–2025
- Labels: Dischi Ricordi; Ariston; Vanilla; CGD; Sony; Epic; Columbia; BMG
- Spouse: Lucio Ardenzi (m. 1960; sep. 1965)

Ornella Vanoni (Italian pronunciation: [orˈnɛlla vaˈnoːni]; 22 September 1934 – 21 November 2025) was an Italian singer and songwriter. With a career spanning almost seventy years, she was one of Italy's longest-standing musical artists. During her long career, she released about 121 works between LPs, EPs and greatest hits albums, and sold over 65 million records, being considered one of the most popular performers of Italian pop music.

== Artistic career ==
Vanoni started her artistic career in 1960 as a theatre actress. She mostly performed in Bertolt Brecht works, under the direction of Giorgio Strehler at his Piccolo Teatro in her native city of Milan. At the same time, she started a music career. The folklore and popular songs she explored in her early records, especially the ones about the criminal underworld in Milan (Canzoni della Mala), resulted in her receiving the nickname cantante della mala ("Underworld Singer") for singing Milanese dialect songs on that genre.

Vanoni scored two major hits in 1963 with "Senza fine" and "Che cosa c'è", both written for her by Gino Paoli, who also sang and recorded his own versions. In 1964, she won the Festival of Neapolitan song with "Tu si na cosa grande". In the following years, she took part in a series of Festivals of Italian song in Sanremo with the songs "Abbracciami forte" (1965), "Io ti darò di più" (1966), "La musica è finita" (1967), "Casa Bianca" (1968), and "Eternità" (1970). "Casa Bianca", which finished second in 1968, was the subject of a copyright dispute between the composer of the song, Don Backy, and the Clan Celentano label.

In the late 1960s, Vanoni recorded "Una ragione di più", "Un'ora sola ti vorrei", "L'appuntamento" (a cover of the Brazilian song "Sentado à beira do caminho" by Erasmo Carlos and Roberto Carlos) and "Non dirmi niente", a cover of Burt Bacharach's "Don't Make Me Over". In 1972, she sang "Quei giorni insieme a te", the theme from Lucio Fulci's critically acclaimed mystery thriller film Don't Torture a Duckling.

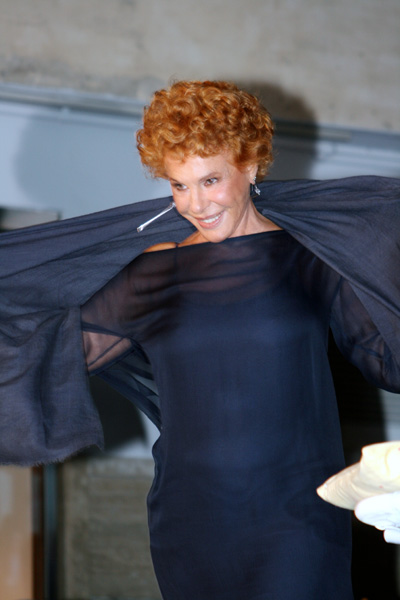
Ornella Vanoni in 2007

In 1976, Vanoni collaborated with Vinicius de Moraes and Toquinho on the album La voglia, la pazzia, l'incoscienza, l'allegria, best remembered for its title track "La voglia, la pazzia". During the 1980s, she released "Ricetta di donna", "Uomini", and "Ti lascio una canzone" (with Gino Paoli). In 1989, she returned to the Sanremo Music Festival with the song "Io come farò". In 1999, she recorded "Alberi", a duet with Enzo Gragnaniello. In 2004, she released an album of duets with Paoli to celebrate her 70th birthday.

In addition to her music career, Vanoni was active in other creative fields, starring in stage and in television shows and movies. In January 1977, she posed nude for the Italian edition of Playboy magazine and requested a statuette by her long-time friend the artist Arnaldo Pomodoro as payment. The inclusion of her song "L'appuntamento" (1970) on the soundtrack of Steven Soderbergh's Ocean's Twelve in 2004 sparked a worldwide renewal of interest in her music. The soundtrack of the Danish film Toscana (2022, Netflix) also featured the song.

== Personal life and death ==
Vanoni had several relationships with other artists, the most important of which were with Giorgio Strehler and Gino Paoli. Between 1960 and 1965, she was married to Lucio Ardenzi, from whom she had one son, Cristiano, in 1962. Due to Vanoni's busy professional life, the child was mainly raised by her parents.

Vanoni was a Christian, and for a period she spent time with Protestants. She was a supporter of the AC Milan association football club. In June 2025, she received an honorary degree in "Music, Culture, Media and Performance" from the University of Milan.

Vanoni died of a heart attack at her home in Milan on 21 November 2025, at the age of 91. Her casket lay in repose at the Piccolo Teatro, where she began her career. Her funeral was held at the Church of San Marco in the Brera district of Milan on 24 November 2025. Before her death, she requested that her remains be cremated and the ashes dispersed in the Venice Lagoon.

== Discography ==
Studio albums

- Ornella Vanoni (1961)
- Le canzoni di Ornella Vanoni (1963)
- Caldo (1965)
- Ornella (1966)
- Ornella Vanoni (1967)
- Ai miei amici cantautori (1968)
- Io sì – Ai miei amici cantautori n.2 (1970)
- Appuntamento con Ornella Vanoni (1970)
- Un gioco senza età (1972)
- Dettagli (1973)
- Ornella Vanoni e altre storie (1973)
- Quei giorni insieme a te (1974)
- A un certo punto... (1974)
- La voglia di sognare (1974)
- Uomo mio, bambino mio (1975)
- La voglia, la pazzia, l'incoscienza, l'allegria (1976)
- Più (1976)
- Io dentro (1977)
- Io fuori (1977)
- Vanoni (1978)
- Ricetta di donna (1980)
- Duemilatrecentouno parole (1981)
- Uomini (1983)
- Ornella &... (1986)
- O (1987)
- Il giro del mio mondo (1989)
- Quante storie (1990)
- Stella nascente (1992)
- Sheherazade (1995)
- Argilla (1997)
- Un panino una birra e poi... (2001)
- ...E poi la tua bocca da baciare (2001)
- Sogni proibiti: Ornella e le canzoni di Bacharach (2002)
- Noi, le donne noi (2003)
- Ti ricordi? No non mi ricordo (2004)
- Più di me (2008)
- Più di te (2009)
- Meticci (Io mi fermo qui) (2013)
- Unica (2021)
- Diverse (2024)

== Filmography ==
=== Film ===
Title	Year	Role(s)	Director	Notes
Ragazzi del Juke-Box	1959	Barmaid	Lucio Fulci	Cameo appearance
Duel of the Titans	1961	Tarpeia	Sergio Corbucci	
Invasion 1700	1962	Woman	Fernando Cerchio	Uncredited
Canzoni in bikini	1963	Herself	Giuseppe Vari	
Amori pericolosi	1964	The Prostitute	Carlo Lizzani	Segment: "La ronda"
I ragazzi dell'Hully Gully	1964	Herself	Marcello Giannini	Cameo appearance
Per un pugno di canzoni	1966	Singer	José Luis Merino	Cameo appearance
Story of a Woman	1970	Ornella's Singing Voice	Leonardo Bercovici	Voice only
I viaggiatori della sera	1979	Nicki Banti	Ugo Tognazzi	
Ornella Vanoni: Ricetta di una donna	2013	Herself	Alexandra Della Porta	Documentary
What a Beautiful Surprise	2015	Carla	Alessandro Genovesi	
Senza fine	2021	Herself	Elisa Fuksas	Documentary
7 Women and a Murder	2021	Rachele	Alessandro Genovesi	
Toquinho: Encontros e um Violão	2024	Herself	Erica Bernardini	Documentary

=== Television ===
Title	Year	Role(s)	Notes
Giosafatte Talarico	1961	Caterina Longoni	Television film
Sanremo Music Festival 1965	1965	Herself / Contestant	Competing with "Abbracciami forte" – 2nd place
Sanremo Music Festival 1966	1966	Herself / Contestant	Competing with "Io ti darò di più" – 6th place
Studio Uno	1966	Herself / Co-host	Variety show (season 4)
Sanremo Music Festival 1967	1967	Herself / Contestant	Competing with "La musica è finita" – 4th place
Sanremo Music Festival 1968	1968	Herself / Contestant	Competing with "Casa Bianca" – 2nd place
Addio giovinezza	1968	Elena	Television film
Senza rete	1968–1972	Herself / Co-host	Variety show (season 1, 3 and 5)
Sanremo Music Festival 1970	1970	Herself / Contestant	Competing with "Eternità" – 4th place
Il mulino del Po	1971	La Sniza	2 episodes
L'appuntamento	1973	Herself / Host	Variety show
Fatti e fattacci	1975	Herself / Co-host	Variety show
Ritratto di Ornella	1977	Herself	Special
Due come noi	1979	Herself / Co-host	Variety show
Lady Magic	1982	Herself / Co-host	Variety show
Risatissima	1984	Herself / Regular guest	Variety show (season 1)
Insieme Vanoni Paoli	1985	Herself / Performer	Special
Sanremo Music Festival 1989	1989	Herself / Contestant	Competing with "Io come farò" – 10th place
Ornella Vanoni in concerto	1991	Herself / Performer	Special
Sanremo Music Festival 1999	1999	Herself / Contestant	Competing with "Alberi (with Enzo Gragnaniello) – 4th place
Ornella: Ancora più di me	2008	Herself / Host and performer	Special
Sanremo Music Festival 2009	2009	Herself / Guest performer	Performing a medley of "Egocentrica" and "Una ragione in più" with Simona Molinari in the duets night
Star Academy	2011	Herself / Judge	Talent show (season 2)
Sanremo Music Festival 2018	2018	Herself / Contestant	Competing with "Imparare ad amarsi" (with Bungaro and Pacifico) – 5th place
Sanremo Music Festival 2019	2019	Herself / Guest performer	Performing "La gente e me"
Amici Celebrities	2019	Herself / Judge	Celebrity version of Amici di Maria De Filippi
Sanremo Music Festival 2020	2020	Herself / Guest performer	Performing "La voce del silenzio" with Alberto Urso in the duets night
Sanremo Music Festival 2021	2021	Herself / Guest performer	Performing a medley of her greatest hits in the final night
La Compagnia del Cigno	2021	Herself	Episode: "In guerra e in amore"
Sanremo Music Festival 2023	2023	Herself / Guest performer	Performing a medley of "Vai, Valentina", "L'appuntamento" and "Eternità" in the final night
Ornella Vanoni: Senza fine	2024	Herself / Host and performer	Special
Che tempo che fa	2024–2025	Herself / Recurring guest	Talk show
