= The Brass Ring =

American popular music group of the 1960s

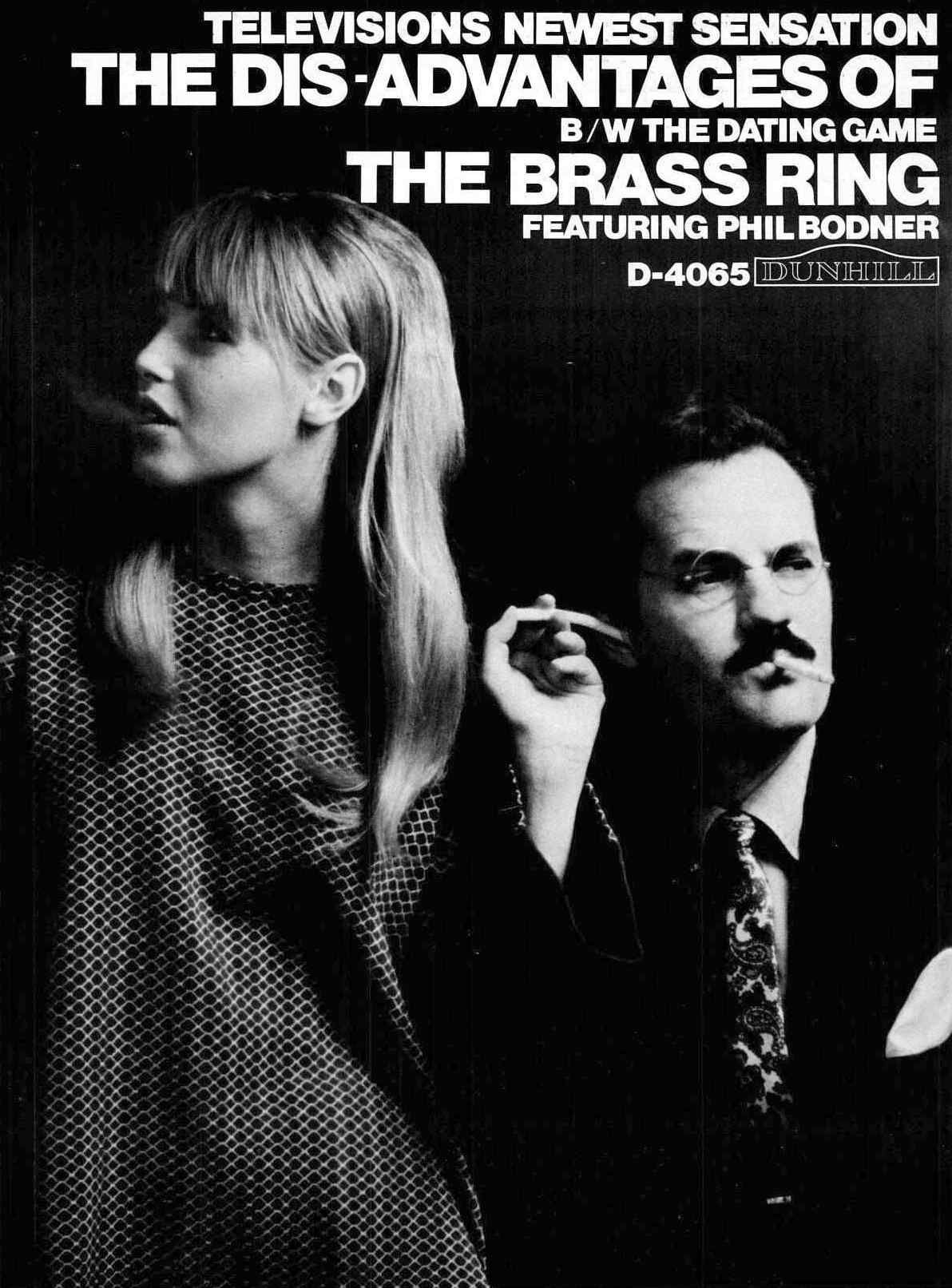
Advertisement for The Brass Ring, 1967

The Brass Ring was a group of American studio musicians led by saxophonist and arranger Phil Bodner.

== Background and style ==
The band was based in New York City and was stylistically similar to The Tijuana Brass, The Brass Buttons, the Baja Marimba Band, and other "Now Sound" instrumental pop groups from the 1960s, although the twin-sax sound more closely resembles the music of Billy Vaughn, whose biggest hits were in the 1950s.

== Chart success ==
In addition to several successful albums for ABC/Dunhill Records, the Brass Ring had two hit singles. The first, "Love Theme from the Flight of the Phoenix", was used in the movie The Flight of the Phoenix, and it reached #32 on the U.S. Billboard Hot 100 in 1966. The second, "The Dis-Advantages of You", written by Mitch Leigh, was used in a series of commercials for Benson & Hedges cigarettes, and rose to #36 in March 1967. Numerous other singles hit Billboard's Easy Listening chart, and a non-chart single, "Love In The Open Air", is prized by collectors, as it is a cover of a little-known composition by Paul McCartney.

The group recorded until at least 1972 on Enoch Light's Project 3 label.

== Discography ==
=== Albums ===
Year	Title	Label	US BB
1966	Lara's Theme	Dunhill Records	-
1966	Love Theme from The Flight of the Phoenix	Dunhill Records	109
1967	Sunday Night at the Movies	Dunhill Records	157
1967	The Dis-Advantages of You	Dunhill Records	193
1968	The Now Sound of the Brass Ring	Dunhill Records	-
1968	Gazpacho: Brass Ring Featuring Phil Bodner	Dunhill Records	-
1968	Only Love	Dunhill Records	-
1970	The Best of the Brass Ring Featuring Phil Bodner	Dunhill Records	-

=== Singles ===
Year	Single (A-side, B-side) Both sides from same album except where indicated	Chart positions		Album
Year	Single (A-side, B-side) Both sides from same album except where indicated	US	US AC	Album
1966	"The Phoenix Love Theme (Senza Fine)" b/w "Lightning Bug" (from Lara's Theme)	32	21	Love Theme From "The Flight Of The Phoenix"
1966	"Lara's Theme" b/w "Secret Love"	126	36	Love Theme From "The Flight Of The Phoenix"
1966	"Samba De Orfeo (Black Orpheus)" b/w "California Dreamin'"	—	25	Lara's Theme
1967	"Lapland" b/w "Patricia"	—	—	Lara's Theme
1967	"The Dis-Advantages Of You" b/w "The Dating Game"	36	10	The Dis-Advantages Of You
1967	"Love In The Open Air" b/w "Wait For Me" (from The Dis-Advantages Of You)	—	—	The Now Sound Of The Brass Ring
1967	"Monday Monday" b/w "Flower Road" (Non-album track)	—	—	The Now Sound Of The Brass Ring
1968	"Adoro (Don't Tempt Me)" b/w "Cherry Pink and Apple Blossom White"	—	—	Gazpacho
1968	"Theme From 'The Odd Couple'" b/w "For Love Of Ivy"	—	—	Only Love
1969	"(Theme From) Last Summer" b/w "I'll Never Fall In Love"	—	—	The Evolution Of The Brass Ring
1969	"Spinning Wheel" b/w "Yesterday When I Was Young"	—	—	The Evolution Of The Brass Ring
1976	"Theme From 'The Man Who Would Be King'" b/w "The Sikandergul Theme"	—	—	Non-album tracks
