= Casa de brinquedos =

Studio album by Toquinho
- Released: 1983
- Genre: Bossa nova, MPB
- Length: 37:42
- Label: Polygram
- Producer: Toquinho, Fernando Faro

Casa de Brinquedos is a 1983 album by Toquinho for children. It counts with the collaboration of Mutinho for compositions and the participation of various artist, like Tom Zé, Chico Buarque, Moraes Moreira and Baby Consuelo. All the arrangements were elaborated by Rogério Duprat.

== Track listing ==
#	Title	Songwriters	Performer	Length
1.	"Abertura"	Fernando Faro	Dionisio Azevedo	3:10
2.	"A bicicleta"	Toquinho, Mutinho	Simone	2:52
3.	"O robô"	Toquinho, Mutinho	Tom Zé	2:56
4.	"A bailarina"	Toquinho, Mutinho	Lucinha Lins	3:07
5.	"O avião"	Toquinho	Toquinho	4:03
6.	"O trenzinho"	Toquinho, Mutinho	Roupa Nova	2:42
7.	"Os super-heróis"	Toquinho, Mutinho	MPB-4	3:29
8.	"O caderno"	Toquinho, Mutinho	Chico Buarque	2:54
9.	"O macaquinho de pilha"	Toquinho, Mutinho	Paulinho Boca de Cantor, Carlinhos Vergueiro	3:32
10.	"A espingarda de rolha"	Toquinho, Mutinho	Baby Consuelo	3:35
11.	"A bola"	Toquinho, Mutinho	Moraes Moreira	2:46
12.	"O ursinho de pelúcia"	Toquinho, Mutinho	Claudio Nucci	2:31

== Personnel ==
- Rogério Duprat - arrangement and conducting
