= Meticci (Io mi fermo qui) =

Studio album by Ornella Vanoni
- Released: 10 September 2013
- Genre: Pop
- Label: Sony
- Producer: Mario Lavezzi

Ornella Vanoni chronology
| Live al Blue Note (2010) | Meticci (Io mi fermo qui) (2013) | Un pugno di stelle (2018) |

Meticci (Io mi fermo qui) is a studio album by Italian singer Ornella Vanoni, released on 10 September 2013 by Sony Music.

The album, like the previous ones, was produced by Mario Lavezzi. The illustrations for the album were made by Giuseppe Maldini.

Vanoni stated that this would be her last studio album, but in 2021 the album Unica was released, containing new material.

== Track listing ==
| No. | Title | Writer(s) | Length |
|---|---|---|---|
| 1. | "Basta poco" | Mario Lavezzi; Lorenzo Vizzini; Ornella Vanoni | 3:18 |
| 2. | "La donna dai capelli blu mare" | Lavezzi; Vizzini; Vanoni | 3:53 |
| 3. | "Meticci" | Vizzini; Vanoni | 3:19 |
| 4. | "Dalla tua vita" | Vizzini; Vanoni | 3:38 |
| 5. | "Il bambino sperduto" | Nada | 3:55 |
| 6. | "Non è questa casa mia" | Vizzini; Vanoni | 3:53 |
| 7. | "Terra nera" | Vizzini; Vanoni | 4:10 |
| 8. | "Il fiume" | Roberto Pacco; Tommy Di Salvo | 3:45 |
| 9. | "Che vitalità" | Vizzini; Vanoni | 4:00 |
| 10. | "Costruzione (Construçao)" | Chico Buarque | 4:46 |
| 11. | "4 marzo '43" | Lucio Dalla; Paola Pallottino | 3:51 |
| 12. | "Aurora" | Franco Battiato; Nabil Salameh; Manlio Sgalambro | 2:54 |
| 13. | "Di passaggio" | Gabriele Semeraro; Vizzini | 4:15 |

== Charts ==
Chart performance for Meticci (Io mi fermo qui)
| Chart (2013) | Peak position |
|---|---|
| Italian Albums (FIMI) | 6 |
