= La voglia, la pazzia, l'incoscienza, l'allegria =

Studio album by Ornella Vanoni, Vinicius de Moraes and Toquinho
- Released: April 1976
- Recorded: 1–9 April 1976
- Studio: Fonit-Cetra Studios, Milan
- Genre: MPB; bossa nova; samba
- Length: 33:16
- Language: Italian; Portuguese
- Label: Vanilla
- Producer: Sergio Bardotti

Ornella Vanoni chronology
Uomo mio bambino mio (1975)	La voglia, la pazzia, l'incoscienza, l'allegria (1976)	Più (1976)

Vinicius de Moraes chronology
Marilia Vinicius (1972)	La voglia, la pazzia, l'incoscienza, l'allegria (1976)	Antologia Poética (1977)

Toquinho chronology
Boca Da Noite (1974)	La voglia, la pazzia, l'incoscienza, l'allegria (1976)	Tocando (1977)

Professional ratings
Review scores
Source	Rating
AllMusic	3.5/5 stars
OndaRock	Pietra miliare italiana

La voglia, la pazzia, l'incoscienza, l'allegria is a studio album by Italian singer Ornella Vanoni, recorded in collaboration with Brazilian singer-songwriter Vinicius de Moraes and guitarist Toquinho. The album was released in 1976 by Vanilla in Italy.

In 2012, Rolling Stone placed the album on the 76th place of the list of the hundred best Italian albums.

== Track listing ==
Side A
No.	Title	Writer(s)	Performer(s)	Length
1.	"Senza paura (Sem medo)"	Sergio Bardotti; Vinicius de Moraes; Toquinho	Ornella Vanoni; Toquinho	3:53
2.	"La rosa spogliata (A rosa desfolhada)"	Bardotti; Moraes; Toquinho	Vanoni	2:50
3.	"Samba della Rosa (Samba da Rosa)"	Bardotti; Moraes; Toquinho	Vanoni; Moraes; Toquinho	2:58
4.	"Samba in preludio (Samba em prelúdio)"	Bardotti; Moraes; Baden Powell de Aquino	Moraes; Vanoni	3:46
5.	"Anema e core"	Tito Manlio; Salve D'Esposito	Vanoni	1:38
6.	"La voglia la pazzia (Se ela quisesse)"	Bardotti; Moraes; Toquinho	Vanoni; Moraes; Toquinho	2:52
Total length:				17:57

Side B
No.	Title	Writer(s)	Performer(s)	Length
1.	"Semaforo rosso (Sinal fechado)"	Bardotti; Paulinho da Viola	Vanoni; Toquinho	1:55
2.	"Assenza (Ausencia)"	Moraes	Vinicius de Moraes	0:30
3.	"Io so che ti amerò (Eu sei que vou te amar)"	Bardotti; Moraes; Antônio Carlos Jobim	Vanoni; Moraes	3:52
4.	"Un altro addio (Mais um adeus)"	Bardotti; Moraes; Toquinho	Vanoni; Toquinho	3:47
5.	"L’assente (O ausente)"	Moraes	Moraes	0:58
6.	"Accendi una luna nel cielo (Acende uma lua no ceu)"	Bardotti; Moraes; Toquinho	Moraes; Vanoni	1:39
7.	"Samba per Vinicius (Samba pra Vinícius)"	Bardotti; Chico Buarque de Hollanda; Toquinho	Vanoni; Moraes; Toquinho	2:38
Total length:				15:19

== Personnel ==
- Ornella Vanoni – vocals
- Vinicius de Moraes – vocals
- Toquinho – vocals, guitar
- Azeitona – bass
- Mutinho – drums
- I musicals di Dino Comolli – background vocals
- Gianfranco Lombardi – arrangement

== Charts ==
Chart performance for La voglia, la pazzia, l'incoscienza, l'allegria
Chart (1976)	Peak position
Italian Albums (Musica e dischi)	6

2026 сhart performance for La voglia, la pazzia, l'incoscienza, l'allegria
Chart (2026)	Peak position
Italian Albums (FIMI)	85
Italian Vinyl Albums (FIMI)	11
