= Sheherazade (Ornella Vanoni album) =

Studio album by Ornella Vanoni
- Released: 3 November 1995
- Recorded: June–July 1995
- Genre: Pop; adult contemporary; jazz
- Length: 56:48
- Language: Italian
- Label: CGD; East West
- Producer: Mario Lavezzi

Ornella Vanoni chronology
Io sono come sono... (1995)	Sheherazade (1995)	Argilla (1997)

Sheherazade is the twenty-ninth studio album by Italian singer Ornella Vanoni, released on 3 November 1995 through CGD and East West.

== Critical reception ==
The Music & Media magazine's columnist noted that the versatile singer Ornella Vanoni "with her velvet voice has produced an album full of eclectic ballads, which all have their own character".

== Track listing ==
Original version
No.	Title	Writer(s)	Length
1.	"Il mio trenino"	Oscar Avogadro; Mario Lavezzi	4:12
2.	"Rapiscimi"	Giorgio Conte	4:44
3.	"Per l'eternità"	Mogol; Lavezzi	3:52
4.	"Lupa"	Ornella Vanoni; Roberto Pacco; Avogadro	4:31
5.	"Rossetto e cioccolato"	Vanoni; Pacco; Avogadro	4:00
6.	"Sos"	Vanoni; Grazia Di Michele; Maria Cadierno	4:09
7.	"Io credo"	Vanoni; Di Michele	3:31
8.	"Sei"	Avogadro; Franck Sitbon; B. Brival; Vanoni	4:58
9.	"La rosa"	Avogadro; Lavezzi; Vanoni	4:21
10.	"I desideri delle donne"	Lavezzi; Roberto Mussapi	3:49
11.	"Buonanotte piccolina (Ninna nanna per me)"	Di Michele; Vanoni	4:19
12.	"Angeli e no"	Avogadro; Bruno Marro; Vanoni	4:19
13.	"Sheherazade"	G. Kath; Vanoni; Mussapi	3:10
14.	"Per l'eternità" (Acoustic version)	Mogol; Lavezzi	2:53
Total length:			56:48

Expanded edition (bonus track)
No.	Title	Writer(s)	Length
1.	"Bello amore"	Giuseppe Barbera; Vanoni	3:04
Total length:			59:52

== Charts ==
Chart performance for Sheherazade
Chart (1995)	Peak position
Italian Albums (Musica e dischi)	19
