= Gino Paoli =

Italian singer-songwriter (1934–2026)

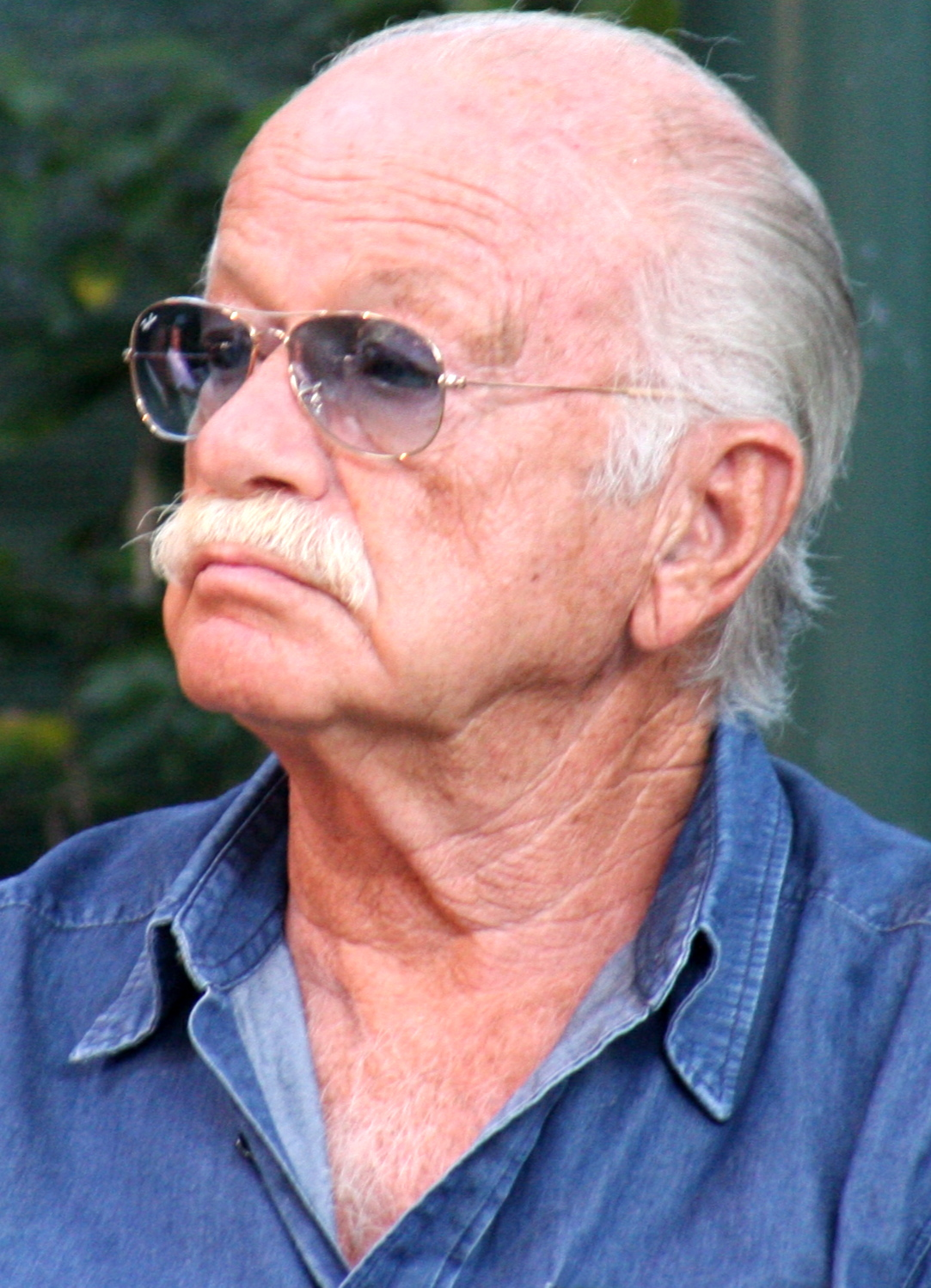
- Paoli in 2010
- Born: 23 September 1934; Monfalcone, Friuli, Kingdom of Italy
- Died: 24 March 2026 (aged 91); Genoa, Liguria, Italy
- Occupations: Singer-songwriter; artist; politician
- Spouses: Anna Fabbri (m. 1957; div. 1970); Paola Penzo (m. 1991)
- Partners: Stefania Sandrelli (1960s); Ornella Vanoni (1960s)
- Children: 5, including Amanda Sandrelli
- Musical career
- Genres: Pop
- Instrument: Vocals
- Years active: 1959–2026
- Labels: RCA Italiana; Durium; Dischi Ricordi; Fonit Cetra
- Website: ginopaoli.it
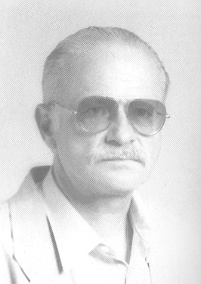
- Official portrait, 1987

Deputy of the Italian Republic
- In office 29 June 1987 – 22 April 1992
- Parliamentary group: PCI (until 9 July 1987); Left-wing independents (from 9 July 1987)
- Constituency: Naples–Caserta

Gino Paoli (Italian pronunciation: [ˈdʒiːno ˈpaːoli]; 23 September 1934 – 24 March 2026) was an Italian singer-songwriter. He wrote a number of songs widely regarded as classics in Italian popular music, including "Il cielo in una stanza", "Che cosa c'è", "Senza fine", "Quattro amici" and "Sapore di sale".

== Early life ==
Paoli was born in Monfalcone, near Trieste, on 23 September 1934. He moved to Genoa as a child, where he spent all his life.

== Career ==
After several different jobs, Paoli was signed to Dischi Ricordi with friends and fellow musicians Luigi Tenco and Bruno Lauzi, who would constitute, along with Paoli, Umberto Bindi, Giorgio Calabrese and other artists, what is known as the "Genoese School" of Italian songwriting. His first success was the single "La gatta", which has been used in Italian language teaching classes in U.S. middle schools and high schools.

"Il cielo in una stanza" was composed in 1959. According to Paoli, the lyrics came to him while lying on a brothel bed. Gazing at the purple ceiling, he thought, "Love can grow at any moment at any place." Mina's single release of the song topped the list of annual sales in Italy and reached the Billboard Hot 100. Video performances of the song were included in the movies Io bacio... tu baci and Appuntamento a Ischia. It was later featured in Goodfellas. Carla Bruni covered the song (mixing French with her native Italian) on her debut album Quelqu'un m'a dit. Paoli's debut album, Gino Paoli, was released in Italy on 8 October 1961 on Dischi Ricordi. "Il cielo in una stanza" was followed by "Sapore di sale" (1963), arranged by Ennio Morricone and considered to be one of Paoli's most famous songs. In the same year he attempted suicide by shooting himself to the heart (the bullet remained inside his chest).

In 1974, he returned with the LP I semafori rossi non sono Dio, followed by Il mio mestiere (1977). Both showed a more mature inspiration than his 1960s works. In the 1980s, Paoli produced a series of successful albums, and in 1985, he toured Italy together with Ornella Vanoni.

In 1987, he was elected to the Italian Chamber of Deputies for the Italian Communist Party, soon withdrawing from the party to become a left-wing independent. He abandoned politics in 1992 to pursue his musical ambitions.

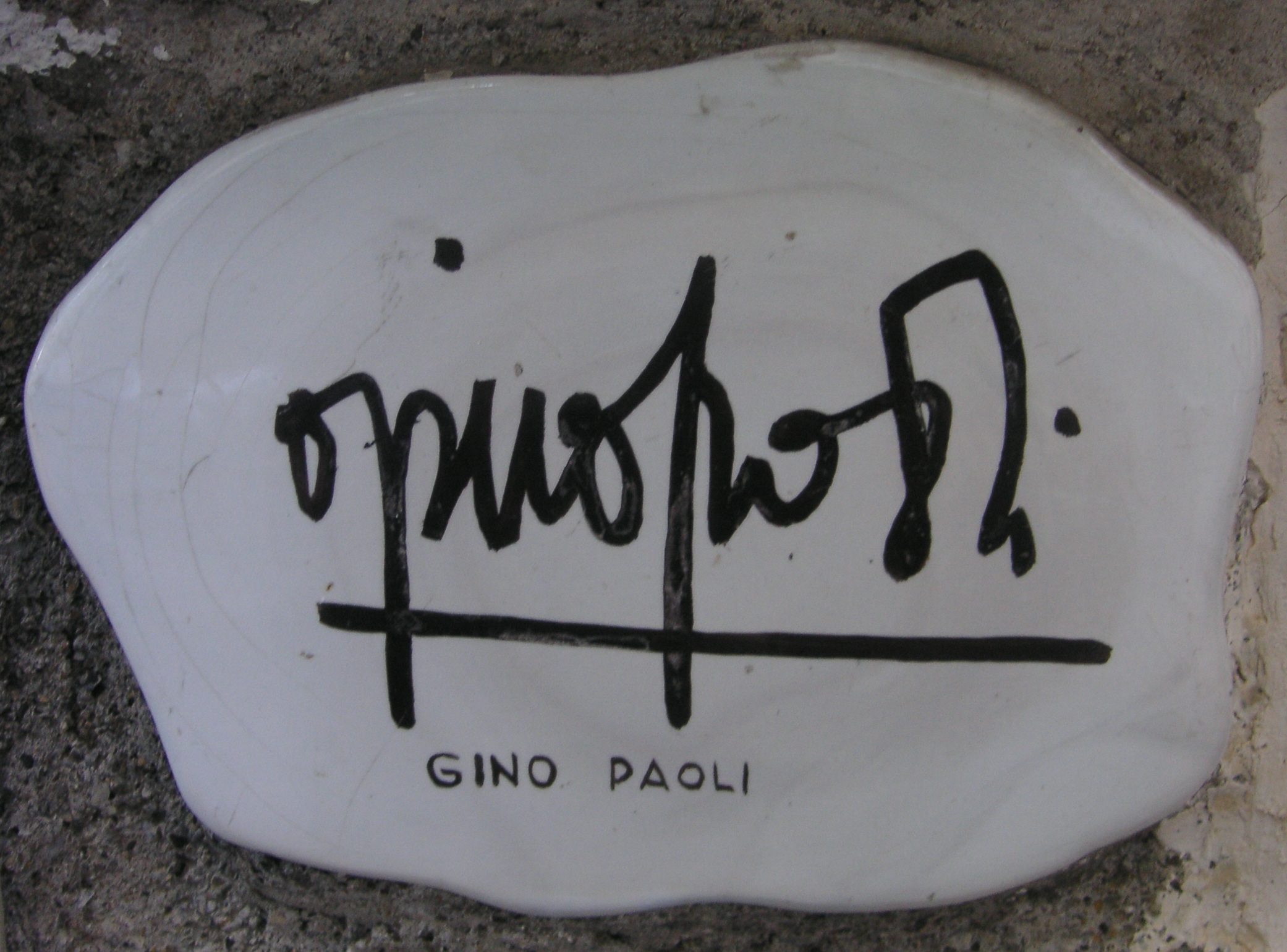
Autograph of Gino Paoli on the muretto of Alassio

== Personal life ==
Paoli had several relationships during his lifetime. He first married Anna Fabbri in 1957, with whom he had a son. After separating, he had a long relationship with actress Stefania Sandrelli in the 1960s; their daughter, Amanda Sandrelli, is also an actress. He subsequently had an affair with singer Ornella Vanoni, who remained a close friend of his throughout their lives. Finally, he began dating Paola Penzo of Modena in the 1970s, marrying her in 1991; the couple had three sons.

=== Legal issues ===
During an interview in February 2015, when a journalist cited a famous phrase of an Italian minister saying that taxes are a good thing, Paoli insulted him. At the time Paoli was under investigation for tax evasion, accused of having brought €2 million of untaxed income to a Swiss bank. He was acquitted in 2016.

=== Death ===
Paoli died in Genoa on 24 March 2026, at the age of 91. His last public appearance was at the funeral of Ornella Vanoni the previous November.

== Discography ==
=== Studio albums ===
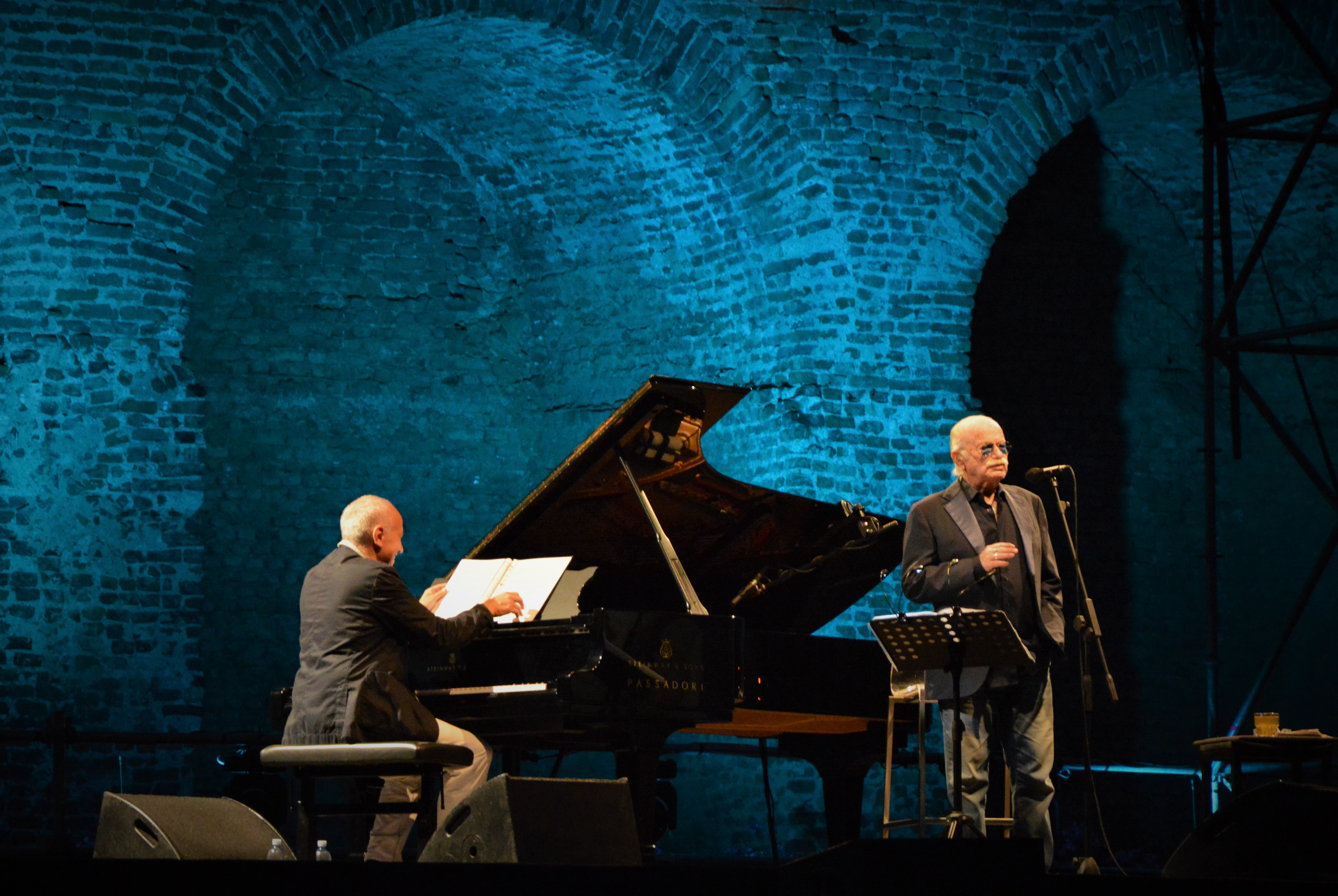
Paoli and Danilo Rea, 2021

- Gino Paoli (1961)
- Le cose dell'amore (1962)
- Basta chiudere gli occhi (1964)
- Gino Paoli allo Studio A (1965)
- Le canzoni per "Emmeti" (1966)
- Gino Paoli and The Casuals (1967)
- Le due facce dell'amore (1971)
- Rileggendo vecchie lettere d'amore (1971)
- Amare per vivere (1972)
- I semafori rossi non sono Dio (1974)
- Ciao, salutime un po' Zena (1975)
- Le canzoni di Gino Paoli (1976, collection)
- Il mio mestiere (1977)
- La ragazza senza nome (1978)
- Il gioco della vita (1979)
- Ha tutte le carte in regola (1980)
- Averti addosso (1984)
- La luna e il Sig. Hyde (1984)
- Insieme (1985)
- Cosa farò da grande (1986)
- Sempre (1988)
- L'ufficio delle cose perdute (1988)
- Gino Paoli '89 dal vivo (1990, live)
- Matto come un gatto (1991)
- Senza contorno solo... per un'ora (1992)
- King Kong (1994)
- Amori dispari (1995)
- Appropriazione indebita (1996)
- Pomodori (1998)
- Per una storia (2000)
- Se (2002)
- Una lunga storia (2004)
- Ti ricordi? No non mi ricordo (2004)
- Gino Paoli & Arsen Dedic u Lisinskom (2005)

=== Singles ===
- 1959 – "La tua mano"/"Chiudi" (Dischi Ricordi, SRL 10.047)
- 1959 – "Dormi"/"Non occupatemi il telefono" (Dischi Ricordi, SRL 10.048)
- 1959 – "La notte"/"Per te" (Dischi Ricordi, SRL 10.074)
- 1959 – "Dedicato a te"/"Senza parole" (Dischi Ricordi, SRL 10.075)
- 1960 – "La gatta"/"Io vivo nella luna" (Dischi Ricordi, SRL 10.114)
- 1960 – "Co-eds"/"Maschere" (Dischi Ricordi, SRL 10.115)
- 1960 – "Il cielo in una stanza"/Però ti voglio bene" (Dischi Ricordi, SRL 10.116)
- 1960 – "Grazie"/"Volevo averti per me" (Dischi Ricordi, SRL 10.130)
- 1960 – "Sassi"/"Maschere" (Dischi Ricordi, SRL 10.161)
- 1961 – "Un uomo vivo"/"In un caffè" (Dischi Ricordi, SRL 10.177)
- 1961 – "Un vecchio bambino"/"Tu prima o poi" (Dischi Ricordi, SRL 10.209)
- 1961 – "Gli innamorati sono sempre soli"/"Senza fine" (Dischi Ricordi, SRL 10.197)
- 1961 – "Un delitto perfetto d'amore"/"Me in tutto il mondo" (Dischi Ricordi, SRL 10.208)
- 1962 – "Le cose dell'amore"/"Due poveri amanti" (Dischi Ricordi, SRL 10.256)
- 1962 – "Devi sapere"/"Non andare via" (Dischi Ricordi, SRL 10.260)
- 1962 – "Una di quelle"/"Anche se" (Dischi Ricordi, SRL 10.291)
- 1963 – "Le cose dell'amore"/"Domani" (RCA Italiana, PM45 3181)
- 1963 – "Sapore di sale"/"La nostra casa" (RCA Italiana, PM45-3204)
- 1963 – "Che cosa c'è"/"Sarà così" (RCA Italiana, PM45-3234)
- 1964 – "Ieri ho incontrato mia madre"/"Ricordati" (RCA Italiana, PM45-3244)
- 1964 – "Vivere ancora"/"Ricordati" (RCA Italiana, PM45-3274)
- 1964 – "Lei sta con te"/"Vivere ancora" (RCA Italiana, PM45-3284)
- 1965 – "Sarà lo stesso"/"Prima di vederti" (RCA Italiana, PM45-3304)
- 1965 – "Rimpiangerai rimpiangerai"/"Il poeta" (RCA Italiana, PM45-3310)
- 1966 – "Un uomo che vale"/"Sempre" (CGD, N 9603)
- 1966 – "La carta vincente"/"La vita è un valzer" (CGD, N 9607)
- 1966 – "A che cosa serve amare"/"Due ombre lunghe" (CGD, N 9611)
- 1967 – "Il mondo in tasca"/"Io che sarei" (CGD, N 9655)
- 1968 – "Se Dio ti da"/"Dormi" (Durium, CN A 9271)
- 1968 – "I giorni senza te"/"La vita è come un ring (Durium, CN A 9286)
- 1969 – "Come si fa"/"Monique" (Durium, CN A 9305)
- 1969 – "Albergo a ore"/"Il tuo viso di sole" (Durium, CN A 9314)
- 1970 – "Un po' di pena"/"Accadde così" (Durium, CN A 9324)
- 1971 – "Con chi fai l'amore Mimì"/"Mamma mia" (Durium, Ld A 7735)
- 1972 – "Non si vive in silenzio"/"Amare per vivere" (Durium, Ld A 7754)
- 1973 – "Un amore di seconda mano"/"Amare inutilmente" (Durium, Ld A 7808)
- 1975 – "La ragazza senza nome"/"È facile amarti" (Durium, Ld A 7882)
- 1977 – "Parole d'amore"/"Madama malinconia" (Durium, Ld A 7981)
- 1980 – "Tu no"/"Livorno" (RCA Italiana, PB 6533)
- 1984 – "Una lunga storia d'amore"/"I cinque sensi" (Five Record, FM 13065)
- 1985 – "Ti lascio una canzone"/"Coppi" (Five Record, FM 13102)
- 1986 – "Da lontano"/"Tema di Anna" (Five Record, FM 13145)
- 1991 – "La bella e la bestia" (Wea)

== Sources ==
- Borgna, Gianni (2005). Gino Paoli: una lunga storia d'amore (in Italian). Baldini Castoldi Dalai.
