= Diverse (album) =

Studio album by Ornella Vanoni
- Released: 18 October 2024
- Genre: Pop; electro-disco
- Language: Italian
- Label: BMG

Ornella Vanoni chronology
Unica (2021)	Diverse (2024)

Singles from Diverse
- 1. "Perduto" Released: 4 September 2024; 2. "Ti voglio" Released: 20 September 2024

Diverse is the last studio album by Italian singer Ornella Vanoni, released on 18 October 2024 by BMG. The album includes the main hits of the singer in a disco treatment with the participation of modern producers.

== Critical reception ==
Professional ratings
Review scores
Source	Rating
Newsic	8/10

Matteo Vaghi from Newsic noted that in the original concept, the songs may have been conceived with melancholic or introspective loads, but now they are sunbathing, fluttering and changing shape. He also stated that Ornella Vanoni, through music, still manages to communicate with power, even at the age of 90, something that words themselves could never express, proving once again that age is only a condition, and that you can be young even at 90 if you have there are ideas and prospects for the future.

== Track listing ==
Diverse CD edition
No.	Title	Writer(s)	Producer(s)	Length
1.	"Perduto"	Magdalena Ana; Alejandro Manuel; Manuel Alvarez Beigbeder Perez; Ornella Vanoni; Romero Casas Purification	Heysimo
2.	"Io so che ti amerò"	Antonio Carlos Jobim; Sergio Bardotti; Vinicius de Moraes	Giordano Colombo
3.	"Arcobaleno"	Giuliano Sangiorgi	Dumar; Protopapa
4.	"Musica musica"	Maurizio Fabrizio; Vanoni; Bardotti	Brail
5.	"Occhi negli occhi"	Chico Buarque; Bardotti	Bruno Bellissimo
6.	"Io che amo solo te"	Sergio Endrigo	Hey Cabrera!
7.	"Per un'amica"	Maurizio Piccoli; Vanoni; Bardotti	Sol Novaro
8.	"Ricetta di donna"	Michele Zarrillo; Vanoni; Amerigo Casella; Bardotti; Totò Savio	Colombo
9.	"Una bellissima ragazza"	Carlo Fava; Gianluca Martinelli	Marco Maiole
10.	"Vai, Valentina"	Fabrizio; Vanoni; Bardotti	Lorenzo Morresi
11.	"Dettagli"	Erasmo Carlos; Roberto Carlos Braga	Daniele; Okgiorgio
12.	"Sant'allegria"	Arnaldo Antunes; Antunes Filho Arnaldo Augusto Nora; Carlo Fava; Gianluca Martinelli; Marisa Monte	Jack Sani
13.	"Ti voglio" (with Elodie and Ditonellapiaga)	Giorgio D'Adamo; Bardotti; Gianni Belleno; Arturo Belloni; Vittorio De Scalzi	Colombo

== Charts ==
Chart performance for Diverse
Chart (2024)	Peak position
Italian Albums (FIMI)	13
Italian Physical Albums (FIMI)	2
