= Unica (Ornella Vanoni album) =

Studio album by Ornella Vanoni
- Released: 29 January 2021
- Genre: Pop
- Language: Italian
- Label: BMG
- Producer: Mauro Pagani

Ornella Vanoni chronology
Un pugno di stelle (2018)	Unica (2021)	Diverse (2024)

Singles from Unica
- 1. "Un sorriso dentro al pianto" Released: 8 January 2021; 2. "Arcobaleno" Released: 29 January 2021; 3. "Carezza d'autunno" Released: 26 February 2021; 4. "Isole viaggianti" Released: 26 March 2021; 5. "Tu Me" Released: 30 September 2021

Professional ratings
Review scores
Source	Rating
Newsic	9/10
OA Plus	7/10
Recensiamo Musica	8,2/10
Rockol	8,5/10

Unica is a studio album by Italian singer Ornella Vanoni, released on 29 January 2021 by BMG.

== Overview ==
In 2013, Vanoni released the album Meticci, which was supposed to be her last studio album. However, in 2018, the singer signed a contract with BMG Rights Management to release one album. During the creation of Unica, the singer collaborated with Mauro Pagani for production and Fabio and Lac for arrangements and much of the songwriting.

Unica consists of eleven songs, one of which is instrumental and serves as an introduction. The album features several collaborations, including artists such as Francesco Gabbani, Carmen Consoli, Virginia Raffaele, Giuliano Sangiorgi, Renato Zero e Pacifico. From a musical point of view, the album is characterized by a strong presence of strings and wind instruments, as well as a variety of genres, ranging from Brazilian sound to author's music and jazz.

The release of the album was timed to coincide with the sixtieth anniversary of Vanoni's career.

== Track listing ==
Standard edition
No.	Title	Writer(s)	Length
1.	"A passo lieve"	Mauro Pagani	1:42
2.	"Specialmente quando ridi"	Fabio Ilacqua; Ornella Vanoni	3:55
3.	"Arcobaleno"	Giuliano Sangiorgi	3:58
4.	"Isole viaggianti"	Ilacqua	3:21
5.	"Carezza d'autunno" (with Carmen Consoli)	Consoli	3:34
6.	"Nuda sull'erba"	Ilacqua; Vanoni	3:50
7.	"Tu Me" (with Virginia Raffaele)	Ilacqua; Vanoni	3:12
8.	"La mia parte" (with Fabio Ilacqua)	Ilacqua	3:14
9.	"Inizio"	Pacifico	2:51
10.	"Un sorriso dentro al pianto"	Francesco Gabbani; Pacifico; Vanoni	3:43
11.	"Ornella si nasce"	Renato Zero; Adriano Pennino	4:42
Total length:			39:09

Celebration edition bonus tracks
No.	Title	Writer(s)	Length
12.	"Un sorriso dentro al pianto" (with Francesco Gabbani; Intimate version)	Gabbani; Pacifico; Vanoni	3:58
13.	"Ornella si nasce" (with Renato Zero; Intimate version)	Zero; Pennino	4:29
14.	"Arcobaleno" (with Giuliano Sangiorgi; Intimate version)	Sangiorgi	4:12
15.	"Inizio" (with Pacifico; Intimate version)	Pacifico	3:43
Total length:			54:31

== Personnel ==
- Ornella Vanoni – vocals (all tracks)
- Mauro Pagani – piano, arrangement (1), chromatic harmonica (5)
- Quartetto Edo Dea Ensemble – bowed string instruments (1, 3, 6)
- Elio Rivagli – drums (2–4, 7–11)
- Massimiliano Gelsi – bass (2–4, 6–11)
- Luca Colombo – guitar (2–4, 6, 8–11), ukulele (3)
- Fabio Gianni – piano (2, 7), electric piano (7), organ (9)
- Fabio Ilacqua – arrangement (1), tastiera (2, 4–6, 8 e 10), electric piano (2–4, 11), background vocals (2–4, 6–10), programming (2–4, 6–9), percussion (2, 3, 5–7, 9, 10), piano (3–8, 10), synthesizer (3, 9), organ (4, 6, 8, 9), glockenspiel (5), melodica (6)
- Daniele Moretto – trumpet (2, 4, 6–9), flugelhorn (11)
- Gabriele Comeglio – alto saxophone (2, 4–9, 11), flute (2, 5–8, 11), clarinet (5), bass clarinet (11)
- Giulio Visibelli – tenor saxophone (2, 4–9, 11), flute (2, 5–8, 11)
- Andrea Andreoli – trombone (2, 4, 7–9, 11)
- Alex Battini de Barreiro – percussion (4, 7 e 8)
- Carmen Consoli – vocals, acoustic guitar (5)
- Giuseppe Salvadori – percussion (6)
- Virginia Raffaele – vocals (7)
- Walter Porro – accordion (8)

== Charts ==
Chart performance for Unica
Chart (2021)	Peak position
Italian Albums (FIMI)	3
Italian Vinyl Albums (FIMI)	2
Swiss Albums (Schweizer Hitparade)	54
