= Toquinho =

Brazilian singer and guitarist (born 1946)

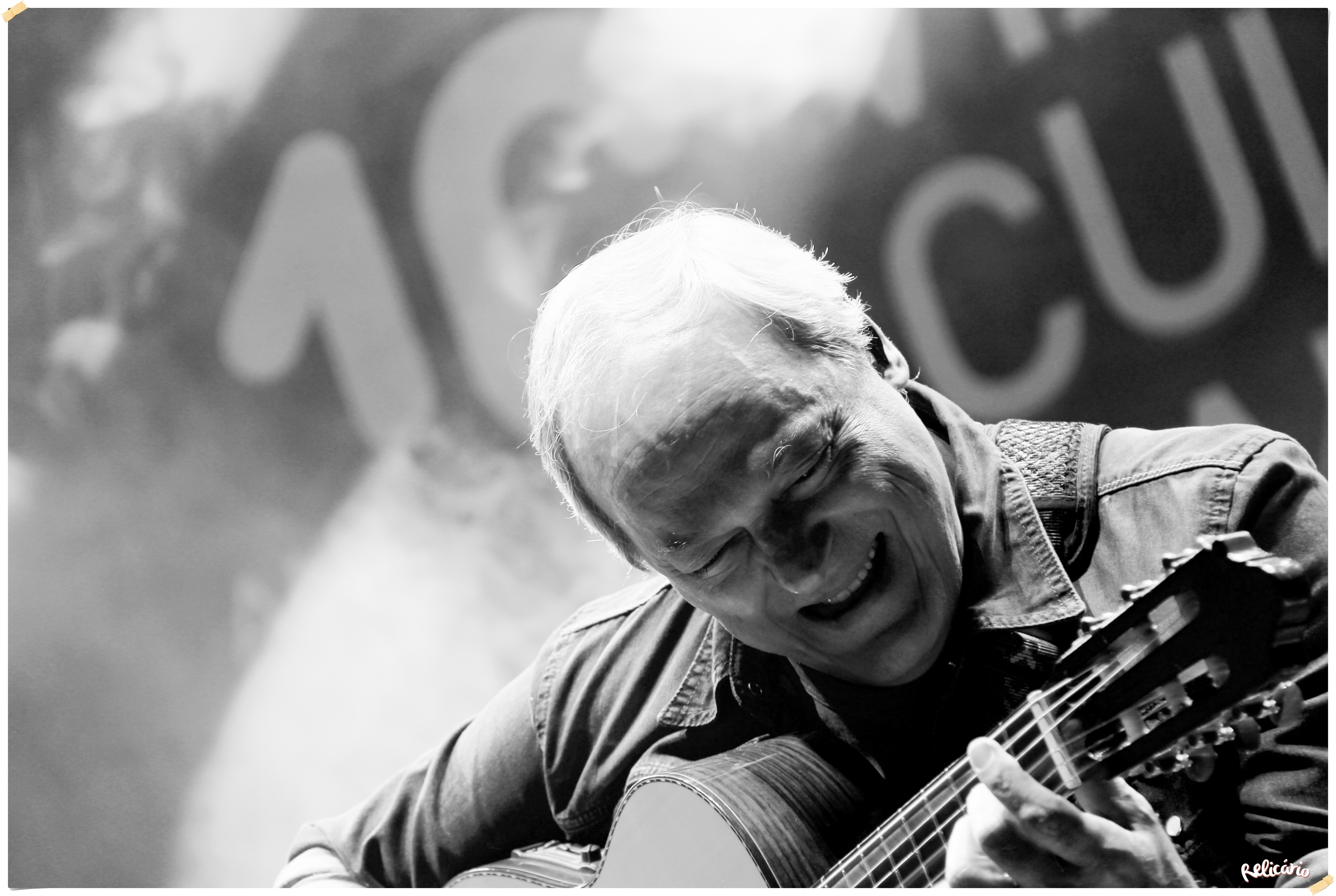
- Toquinho in 2016

Background information
- Born: Antônio Pecci Filho; July 6, 1946 (age 80); São Paulo, Brazil
- Genre: Bossa nova
- Occupations: Musician; singer; composer
- Instruments: Guitar; vocals
- Years active: 1964–present
- Website: www.toquinho.com.br

Antônio Pecci Filho (born July 6, 1946), better known as Toquinho (Brazilian Portuguese pronunciation: [toˈkĩɲu]), is a Brazilian singer and guitarist. He is well known for his collaborations, as composer and performer, with Vinicius de Moraes.

== Childhood and musical studies ==
Toquinho was born in São Paulo to Diva Bondioli and Antônio Pecci. He has one brother, João Carlos Pecci. He has Italian ancestry, with his paternal grandfather being from Toro, Molise, his paternal grandmother being born in Calabria, and his maternal grandparents hailing from Mantua. As he was very short as a child, his mother used to call him "meu toquinho de gente" ("my piece of person"), which was the origin of his nickname.

His first guitar lessons were with Dona Aurora, a piano teacher who also knew how to play guitar. However, she could not continue to teach Toquinho. At age 14, he began lessons with Paulinho Nogueira and went on to study harmony with Edgar Gianulo, classical guitar with Isaías Sávio and orchestration with Léo Peracchi. He also studied with and befriended Oscar Castro-Neves.

== Career ==
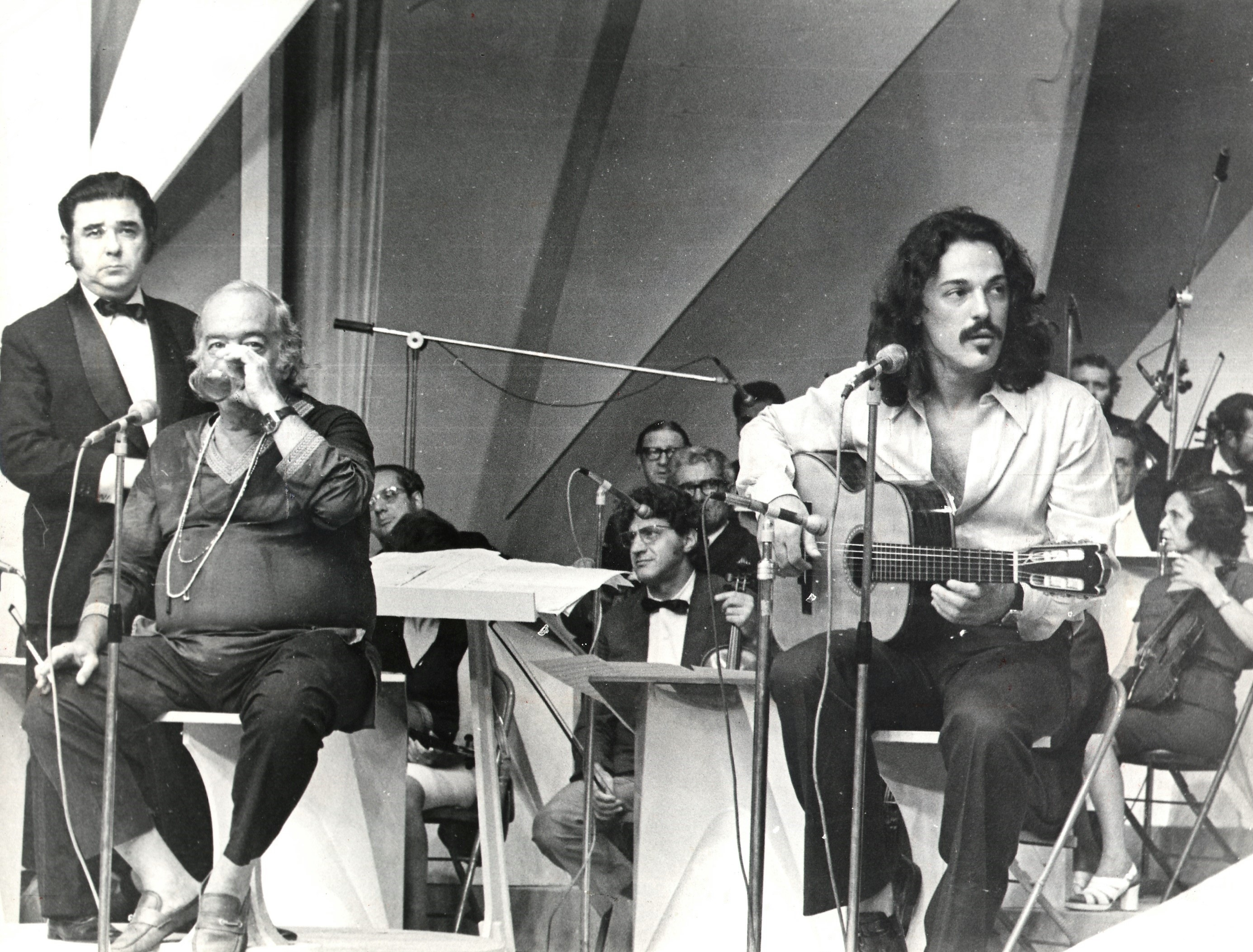
Toquinho (right) performing with Vinicius de Moraes in 1973

Initially playing in colleges, Toquinho's professional career took off in the 1960s at shows promoted by radio personality Walter Silva at the famous Paramount theater in São Paulo. He composed his first recorded song with Chico Buarque entitled "Lua Cheia" (Full Moon). His first big hit was composed in 1970 with Jorge Ben Jor, "Que Maravilha" (What a Wonder).

That same year he was invited by Vinicius de Moraes, co-writer of the worldwide hit "Garota de Ipanema" (The Girl from Ipanema), to participate in a series of shows in Buenos Aires, forming a solid partnership that would continue for 11 years and produce 120 songs, 25 records and over a thousand shows. After the death of Vinicius de Moraes in 1980, Toquinho went on to pursue a solo career, often performing with other talented musicians like Paulinho da Viola, Danilo Caymmi, Paulinho Nogueira and Chico Buarque.

Throughout his career, Toquinho composed songs for children, and recorded five albums for young audiences, including Arca de Noé (1980), with Vinicius de Moraes, and Casa de brinquedos (1983). Toquinho continues to record and play, and he remains popular in Brazil and Italy.

In 2021, his album Toquinho e Yamandu Costa - Bachianinha (Live at Rio Montreux Jazz Festival) (with Yamandu Costa) won the Latin Grammy Award for Best Instrumental Album.

== Discography ==
1960s

- 1966: O violão de Toquinho
- 1969: La vita, amico, è l'arte dell'incontro

1970s

- 1970: Toquinho
- 1970: Vinicius de Moraes en "La Fusa" con Maria Creuza Y Toquinho
- 1971: Como dizia o poeta... Música nova (with Vinicius de Moraes and Marilia Medalha)
- 1971: Per vivere un grande amore
- 1971: São demais os perigos desta vida... (with Vinicius de Moraes)
- 1971: Toquinho e Vinícius
- 1971: Vinicius + Bethania + Toquinho en La Fusa (Mar Del Plata)
- 1972: Vinícius canta "Nossa Filha Gabriela"
- 1973: O bem amado (Original soundtrack)
- 1973: Poeta, moça e violão (with Vinicius de Moraes and Clara Nunes)
- 1973: Botequim (with Gianfrancesco Guarnieri)
- 1974: Boca da noite
- 1974: Toquinho, Vinícius e amigos
- 1974: Fogo sobre Terra (Original soundtrack)
- 1974: Vinícius & Toquinho
- 1975: Vinícius/Toquinho
- 1975: O Poeta e o Violão (with Vinicius de Moraes)
- 1976: La voglia, la pazzia, l'incoscienza, l'allegria
- 1976: Il Brasile nella chitarra strumentale (Torino, Italy)
- 1977: Toquinho tocando
- 1977: The best of Vinicius & Toquinho
- 1977: Tom, Vinícius, Toquinho, Miúcha
- 1978: Toquinho cantando: Pequeno perfil de um cidadão comum
- 1979: 10 anos de Toquinho e Vinícius

1980s

- 1980: Sempre Amigos (with Paulinho Nogueira)
- 1980: Um pouco de ilusão
- 1980: A arca de Noé (with Vinicius de Moraes)
- 1980: A Arca de Noé 2 (with Vinicius de Moraes)
- 1981: Toquinho, la chitarra e gli amici
- 1981: Doce vida
- 1982: Toquinho ao vivo em Montreaux
- 1983: Aquarela
- 1983: Casa de brinquedos
- 1984: Sonho dourado
- 1984: Bella la vita
- 1985: A luz do solo
- 1986: Coisas do coração
- 1986: Le storie di una storia sola
- 1986: Vamos juntos: Toquinho Live at Bravas Club'86, Tokyo
- 1987: Canção de todas as crianças
- 1988: Made in coração
- 1989: Toquinho in Canta Brasil
- 1989: À sombra de um jatobá

1990s

- 1990: Toquinho instrumental
- 1992: El viajero del sueño
- 1992: Il viaggiatore del sogno
- 1992: O viajante do sonho
- 1993: La vita è l'arte dell'incontro
- 1994: Trinta anos de música
- 1996: Toquinho e suas canções preferidas
- 1999: Toquinho Paulinho Nogueira

2020s

- 2026: Bossa Sempre Nova (with Luísa Sonza and Roberto Menescal)

== Gallery ==
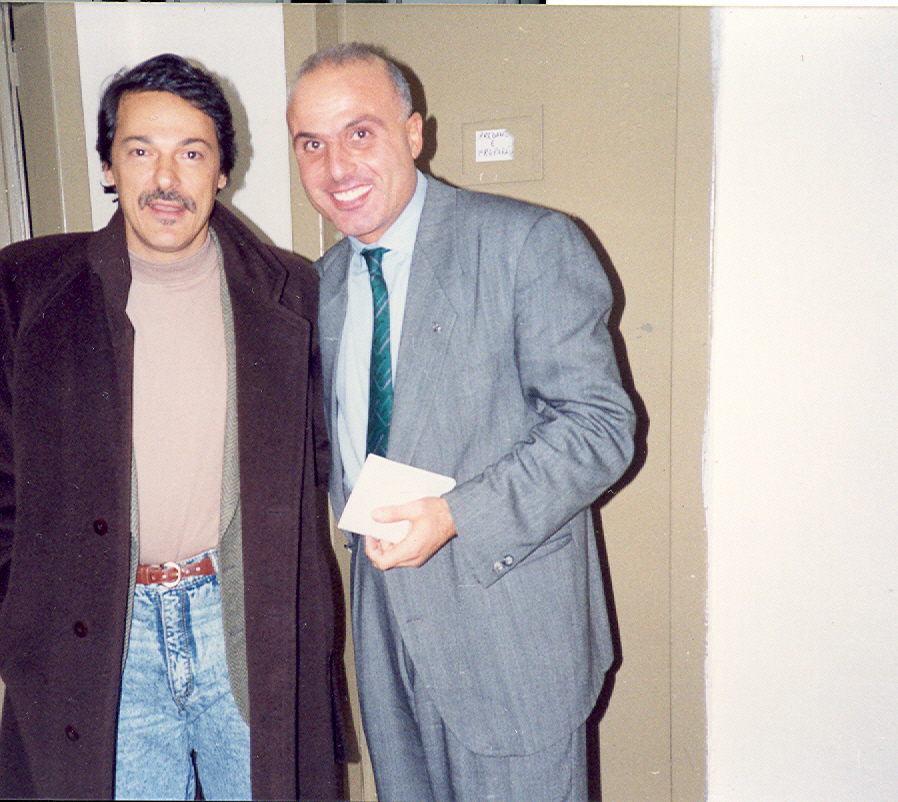
Toquinho and Gildo De Stefano, 1990s

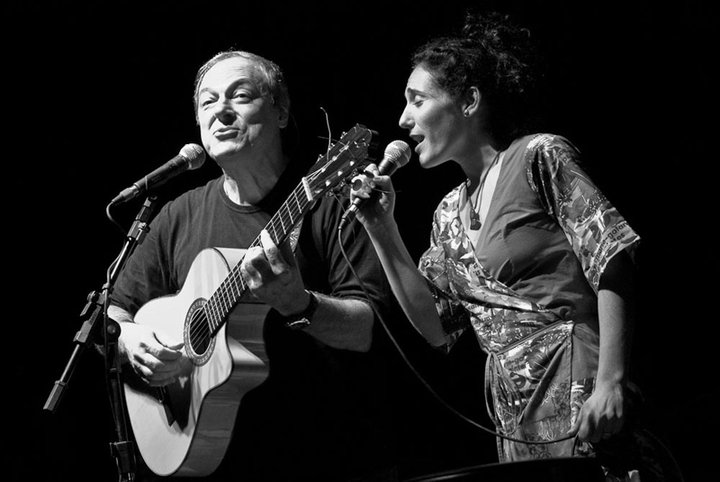
Toquinho and Badi Assad during a show in São João da Boa Vista, Brazil, September 7, 2009

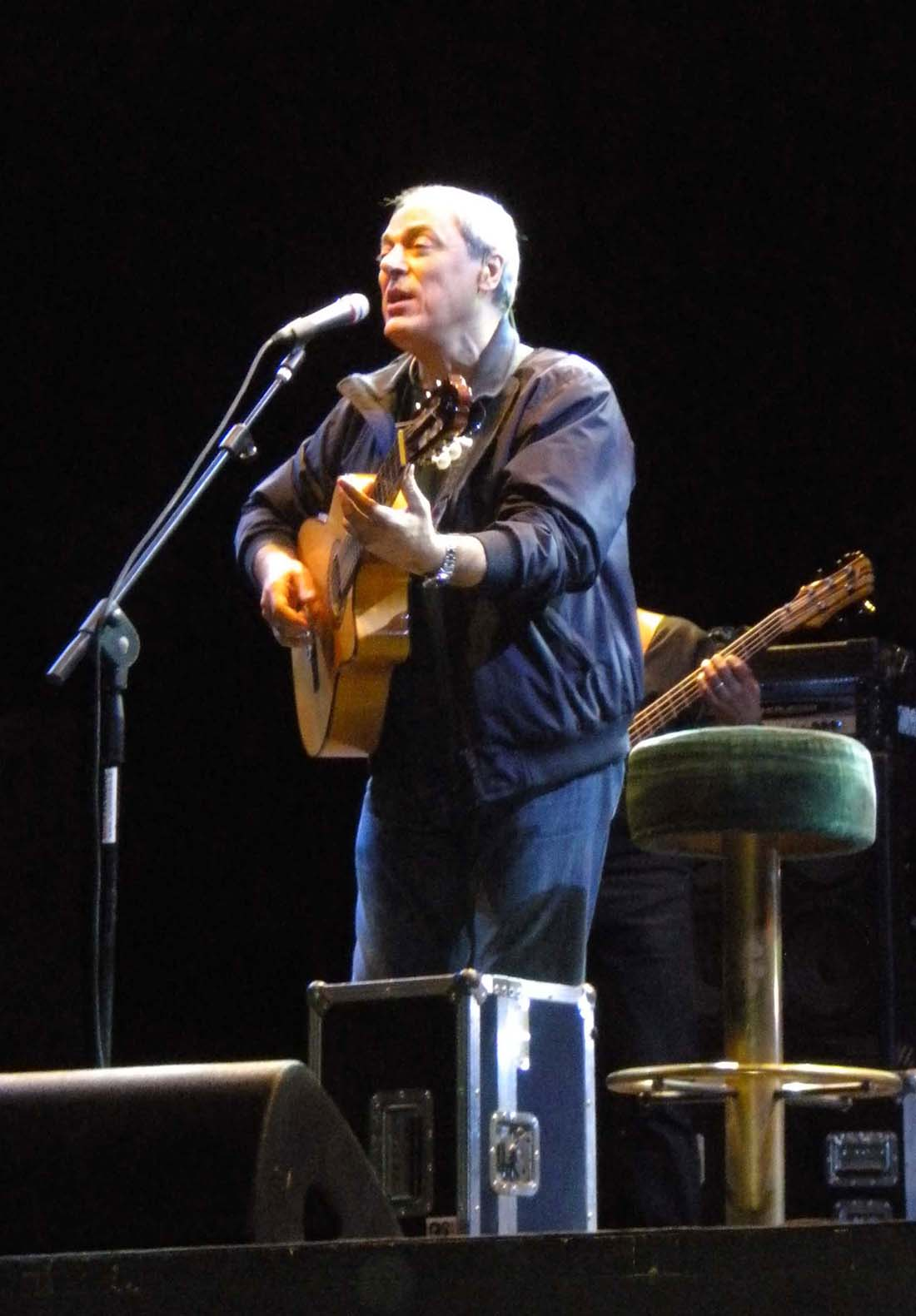
Toquinho during a show in Cremona, Italy, August 5, 2010

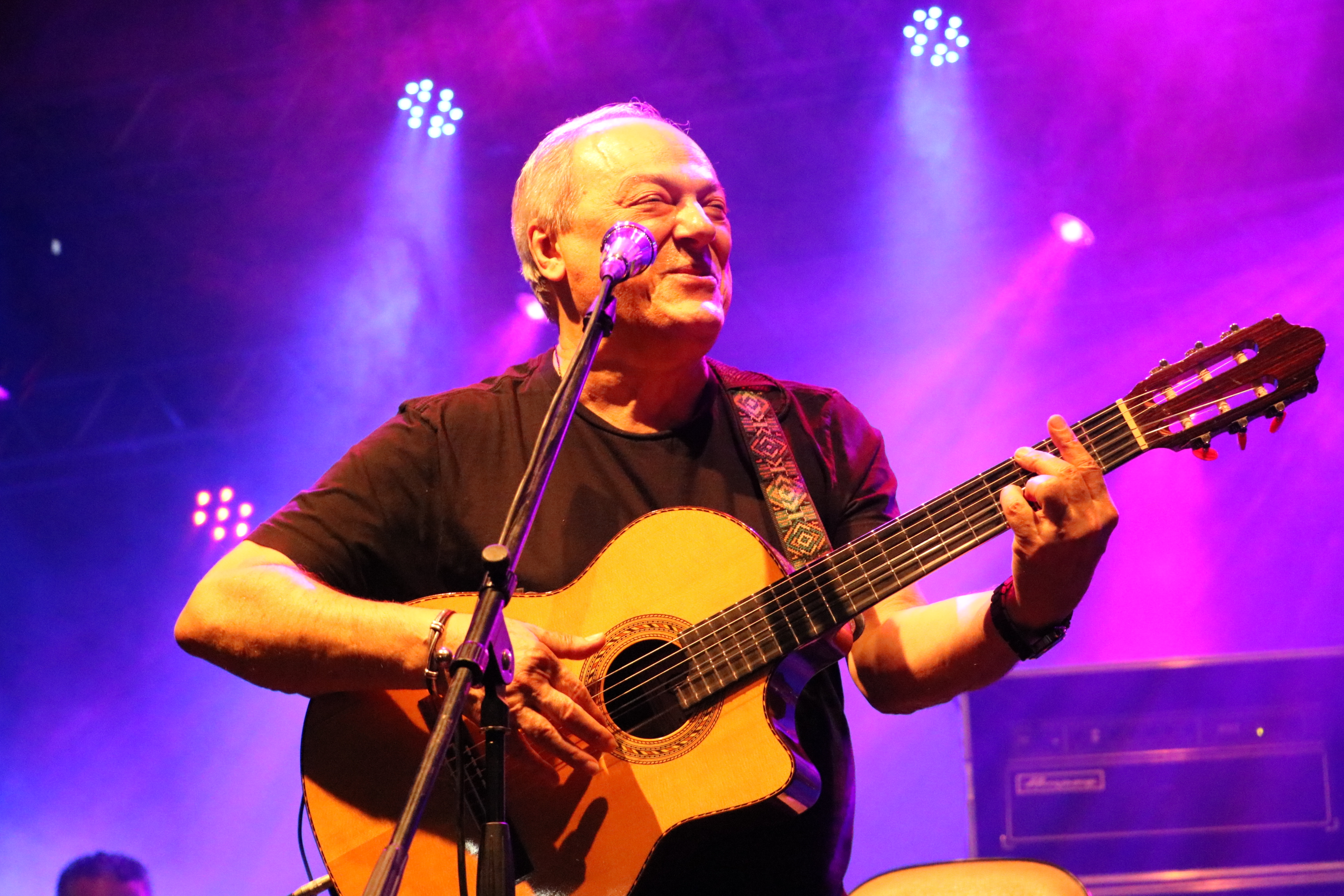
Toquinho during a show in Votuporanga, Brazil, December 22, 2019

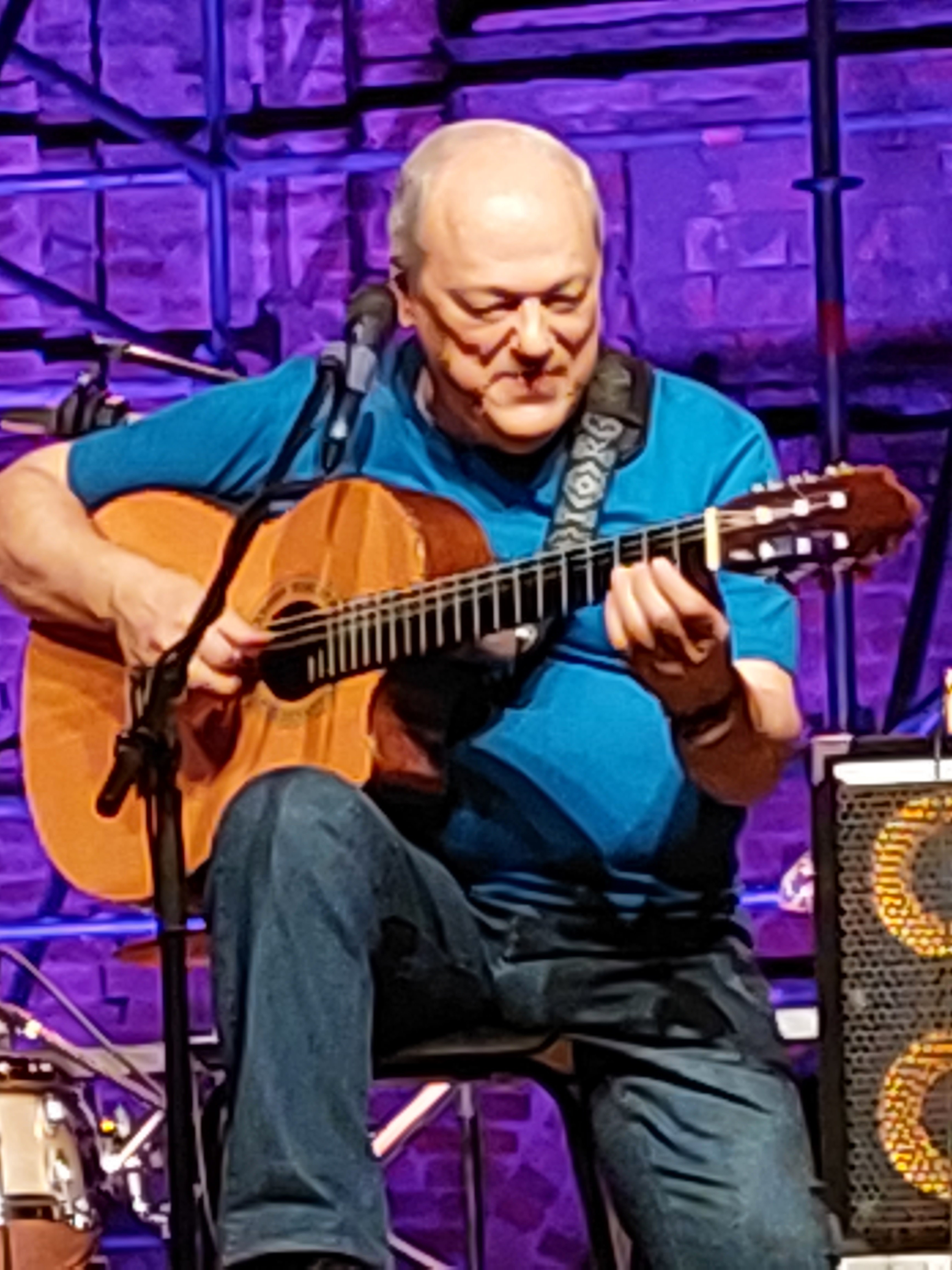
Toquinho during a show in Piacenza, Italy, July 27, 2022

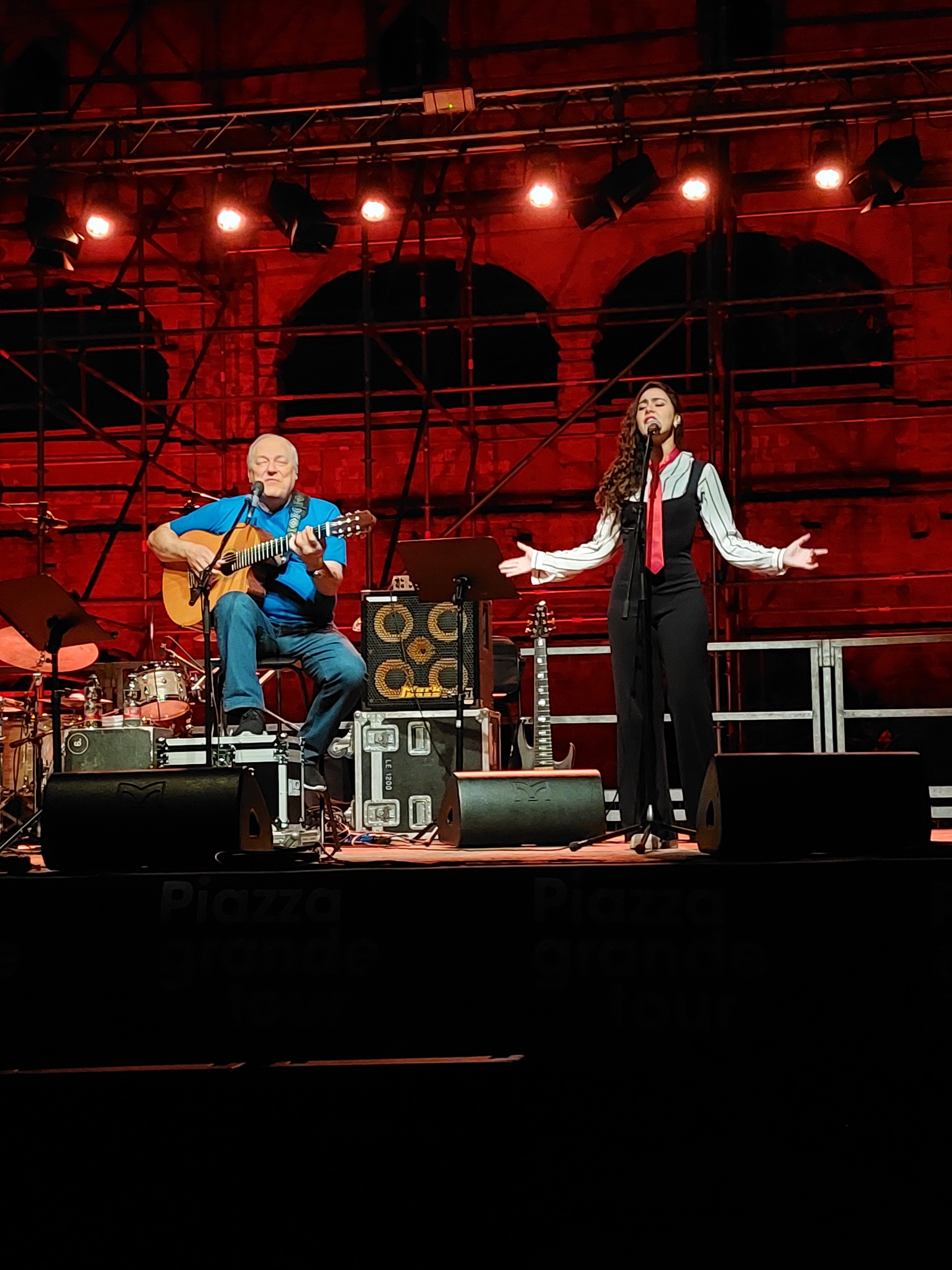
Toquinho and Camilla Faustino during a show in Piacenza, July 27, 2022

== Bibliography ==
- Gildo De Stefano, Il popolo del samba. La vicenda e i protagonisti della storia della brazilian popular music, preface by Chico Buarque de Holanda, introduction by Gianni Minà, RAI Television Editions, Rome, 2005. ISBN 8839713484
- João Carlos Pecci and Wagner Homem, Toquinho, Histórias de canções, Texto Editores Ltda., Sao Paulo, 2010. ISBN 978 8562936708
- Gildo De Stefano, Saudade Bossa Nova: musiche, contaminazioni e ritmi del Brasil, preface by Chico Buarque, introduction by Gianni Minà, Logisma Editore, Florence, 2017. ISBN 978-88-97530-88-6
